= 2018 Young Lions FC season =

Young Lions
2018 season
- Chairman: Farehan Hussein
- Head coach: Vincent Subramaniam
- Stadium: Jalan Besar Stadium
- S.League: Not started
- Singapore Cup: Not started
Home colours	Away colours

The 2018 season was Young Lions' 21st consecutive season in the top flight of Singapore football and in the S.League.

== Squad ==
=== S.League squad ===
As of 26 Feb 2017.

Squad No.	Name	Nationality	Date of birth (age)	Last club
Goalkeepers
1	Hairul Syirhan	(Singapore)	21 August 1995 (age 31)	(Singapore) Geylang International
18	Zharfan Rohaizad	(Singapore)	21 February 1997 (age 29)	(Singapore) NFA U18
30	Adib Hakim	(Singapore)	9 March 1998 (age 28)	(Singapore) NFA U18
	Ridhwan Fikri	(Singapore)	29 April 1999 (age 27)	(Singapore) NFA U18
Defenders
2	Nazhiim Harman	(Singapore)	2 March 1999 (age 27)	(Singapore) NFA U18
5	Adam Hakeem	(Singapore)	17 March 1997 (age 29)	Free Agent
12	Syahrul Sazali	(Singapore)	3 June 1998 (age 28)	(Singapore) NFA U18
13	Amer Hakeem	(Singapore)	8 November 1998 (age 28)	(Singapore) Hougang United Prime League
17	Irfan Fandi	(Singapore) (South Africa)	13 August 1997 (age 29)	(Singapore) Home United
20	Ariyan Shamsuddin	(Singapore)	28 August 1997 (age 29)	(Singapore) Hougang United Prime League
24	R Aaravin	(Singapore)	24 February 1996 (age 30)	(Singapore) Home United
25	Rusyaidi Salime	(Singapore)	25 April 1998 (age 28)	(Singapore) NFA U17
27	Taufiq Muqminin	(Singapore)	26 July 1996 (age 30)	(Singapore) NFA U18
31	Jacob William Mahler	(Singapore) (Denmark)	20 April 2000 (age 26)	(Singapore) NFA U18
	Irfan Asyraf Aziz	(Singapore)	20 September 1997 (age 29)	Free Agent
Midfielders
3	Saifullah Akbar	(Singapore)	31 January 1999 (age 27)	(Singapore) Tampines Rovers Prime League
4	Aniq Iskandar	(Singapore)	30 October 1996 (age 30)	(Singapore) Warriors FC Prime League
7	Naqiuddin Eunos	(Singapore)	1 December 1997 (age 28)	Free Agent
8	Joshua Pereira	(Singapore)	10 October 1997 (age 29)	(Singapore) NFA U18
10	Sharul Nizam	(Singapore)	2 June 1997 (age 29)	Free Agent
11	Zulqarnaen Suzliman	(Singapore)	29 March 1998 (age 28)	(Singapore) NFA U17
14	Hami Syahin	(Singapore)	16 December 1998 (age 27)	(Singapore) NFA U16
15	Syed Firdaus Hassan	(Singapore)	30 May 1998 (age 28)	(Singapore) Home United Prime League
21	Prakash Raj	(Singapore)	11 June 1998 (age 28)	(Singapore) Hougang United Prime League
22	Haiqal Pashia	(Singapore)	29 November 1998 (age 27)	(Singapore) NFA U18
23	Asshukrie Wahid	(Singapore)	27 February 1997 (age 29)	(Singapore) Geylang International Prime League
28	Amirul Hakim	(Singapore)	4 June 1998 (age 28)	(Singapore) NFA U18
Forwards
6	Danial Syafiq	(Singapore)	29 December 1999 (age 26)	(Singapore) NFA U18
9	Ikhsan Fandi	(Singapore) (South Africa)	9 April 1999 (age 27)	(Singapore) Home United Prime League
19	Naufal Azman	(Singapore)	10 July 1998 (age 28)	Free Agent
32	Ifwat Ismail	(Singapore)	27 March 1997 (age 29)	(Singapore) Geylang International Prime League

== Coaching staff ==
Position	Name
Team Manager	(Singapore) Farehan Hussein
Head team coach	(Singapore) Fandi Ahmad
Assistant coach	(Singapore) Nazri Nasir
Assistant coach	(Singapore) S. Subramani
Goalkeeping coach	(Singapore) Chua Lye Heng
Physiotherapist	Vacant
Sports Trainers	(Singapore) Nasruldin Baharudin (Singapore) Muklis Sawit
Equipment Officer	(Singapore) Omar Mohamed

== Transfer ==
=== Pre-season transfer ===
==== In ====
Position	Player	Transferred from	Ref
GK	(Singapore) Ridhwan Aban	(Singapore) NFA U18	
DF	(Singapore) Adam Hakeem	Free Agent	
DF	(Singapore) Amer Hakeem	(Singapore) Hougang United Prime League	Season loan
DF	(Singapore) Ariyan Shamsuddin	(Singapore) Hougang United Prime League	Season loan
DF	(Singapore) Irfan Fandi	(Singapore) Home United	Free
DF	(Singapore) Nazhiim Harman	(Singapore) NFA U18	
MF	(Singapore) Aniq Iskandar	(Singapore) Warriors FC Prime League	Season loan
MF	(Singapore) Prakash Raj	(Singapore) Hougang United Prime League	Season loan
MF	(Singapore) Naqiuddin Eunos	Free Agent	
MF	(Singapore) Sharul Nizam	Free Agent	
MF	(Singapore) Asshukrie Wahid	(Singapore) Geylang International Prime League	Season Loan
MF	(Singapore) Syed Firdaus Hassan	Free Agent	
FW	(Singapore) Ifwat Ismail	(Singapore) Geylang International Prime League	Season Loan
FW	(Singapore) Danial Syafiq	(Singapore) NFA U18	
FW	(Singapore) Naufal Azman	Free Agent	

==== Out ====
Position	Player	Transferred To	Ref
GK	(Singapore) Fashah Iskandar	(Singapore) Warriors FC	
DF	(Singapore) Shahrin Saberin	(Singapore) Home United	loan return
DF	(Singapore) Yeo Hai Ngee	(Singapore) Geylang International	
DF	(Singapore) Amirul Adli	(Singapore) Tampines Rovers	
DF	(Singapore) Faizal Roslan	(Singapore) Home United	
DF	(Singapore) Illyas Lee	(Singapore) Hougang United	
DF	(Singapore) J.Dhukilan	(Singapore)	
MF	(Singapore) (Germany) Armin Maier	(Germany) TSV Buchbach U23	
MF	(Singapore) Ammirul Emmran	(Singapore) Warriors FC	
MF	(Singapore) Muhaimin Suhaimi	(Singapore) Hougang United	
MF	(Singapore) Hafiz Sulaiman	(Singapore) Warriors FC	
MF	(Singapore) Ryan Syaffiq	(Singapore) Geylang International	
MF	(Singapore) Jordan Chan	(Singapore) Hougang United	
MF	(Singapore) Muhelmy Suhaimi	(Singapore) Home United	
FW	(Singapore) Taufik Suparno	(Singapore) SAFSA	
FW	(Singapore) Shameer Aziq	(Singapore) Tampines Rovers	
FW	(Singapore) Shafeeq Faruk	(Singapore) SAFSA	

==== Retained ====
Position	Player	Ref
GK	(Singapore) Adib Hakim	
GK	(Singapore) Hairul Syirhan	
GK	(Singapore) Zharfan Rohaizad	
DF	(Singapore) Rusyaidi Salime	
DF	(Singapore) R Aaravin	
DF	(Singapore) Syahrul Sazali	
DF	(Singapore) Taufiq Muqminin	
MF	(Singapore) Joshua Pereira	
MF	(Singapore) Hami Syahin	
MF	(Singapore) Zulqarnaen Suzliman	
MF	(Singapore) Amirul Hakim	
MF	(Singapore) Haiqal Pashia	
FW	(Singapore) Ikhsan Fandi	

==== Trial ====
Position	Player	Trial @	Ref
DF	(Singapore) Irfan Fandi	(Netherlands) FC Groningen	
FW	(Singapore) Ikhsan Fandi	(Netherlands) FC Groningen	

=== Mid-season transfer ===
==== In ====
Position	Player	Transferred from	Ref
DF	(Singapore) Jacob William Mahler	(Singapore) NFA U18	
DF	(Singapore) Irfan Asyraf Aziz	Free Agent	
MF	(Singapore) Saifullah Akbar	Free Agent	2 Years contract till 2019

==== Trial ====
Position	Player	Trial @	Ref
DF	(Singapore) Irfan Fandi	(England) Leeds United	
DF	(Singapore) Irfan Fandi	(Portugal) S.C. Braga	
FW	(Singapore) Ikhsan Fandi	(Portugal) S.C. Braga	

== Friendly ==
=== Pre-season friendly ===
Win Draw Loss

31 January 2018 1	Young Lions (Singapore)	0–0	(Singapore) Balestier Khalsa	Jalan Besar Stadium
1700 hours

4 February 2018 2	Young Lions (Singapore)	4–0	Singapore Cricket Club	Jalan Besar Stadium
1700 hours

3 March 2018 3	Young Lions (Singapore)	3–2	(Japan) Catherine University	Jalan Besar Stadium
1700 hours	Zulqarnaen Suzliman 23'; Hami Syahin 53' (pen.); Ariyan Shamsudin 90'

7 March 2018 4	Young Lions (Singapore)	1–1	(Japan) Albirex Niigata (S)	Jurong East Stadium
1700 hours		Report	Adam Swandi 54'

=== Kuala Lumpur pre-season training ===
10 February 2018 1	Young Lions (Singapore)	2–4	(Malaysia) PKNS F.C. U21	Shah Alam Stadium
1700 hours

12 February 2018 2	Young Lions (Singapore)	3–0	(Malaysia) UiTM F.C. U21	UiTM Stadium
1700 hours	Danial Syafiq 16'; Hami Syahin 33'; Ikhsan Fandi 67'

14 February 2018 3	Young Lions (Singapore)	0–0	(Malaysia) Kuala Lumpur F.A. U21	KLFA Stadium
1700 hours

== Team statistics ==
=== Appearances and goals ===
As of 15 September 2018

Numbers in parentheses denote appearances as substitute.

No.	Pos.	Player	Sleague		Total	
No.	Pos.	Player	Apps.	Goals	Apps.	Goals
1	GK	(Singapore) Hairul Syirhan	8	0	8	0
2	DF	(Singapore) Nazhiim Harman	4(2)	0	6	0
3	MF	(Singapore) Saifullah Akbar	2(1)	0	3	0
4	MF	(Singapore) Aniq Iskandar	4(3)	0	7	0
5	DF	(Singapore) Adam Hakeem	10(1)	0	11	0
6	FW	(Singapore) Danial Syafiq	0(3)	0	3	0
7	MF	(Singapore) Naqiuddin Eunos	6	0	6	0
8	MF	(Singapore) Joshua Pereira	22	1	22	1
9	FW	(Singapore) Ikhsan Fandi	16(4)	8	20	8
10	MF	(Singapore) Sharul Nizam	1(1)	0	2	0
11	MF	(Singapore) Zulqarnaen Suzliman	18(1)	0	19	0
12	DF	(Singapore) Syahrul Sazali	23	0	23	0
13	DF	(Singapore) Amer Hakeem	3(4)	0	7	0
14	MF	(Singapore) Hami Syahin	22	3	22	3
15	MF	(Singapore) Syed Firdaus Hassan	6(3)	0	9	0
17	DF	(Singapore) Irfan Fandi	18	2	18	2
18	GK	(Singapore) Zharfan Rohaizad	16	0	16	0
19	FW	(Singapore) Naufal Azman	12(4)	2	16	2
20	DF	(Singapore) Ariyan Shamsuddin	0	0	0	0
21	MF	(Singapore) Prakash Raj	9(5)	1	14	1
22	MF	(Singapore) Haiqal Pashia	7(10)	4	17	4
23	MF	(Singapore) Asshukrie Wahid	1(6)	0	7	0
24	DF	(Singapore) R Aaravin	9(3)	1	12	1
25	DF	(Singapore) Rusyaidi Salime	20(1)	0	21	0
27	DF	(Singapore) Taufiq Muqminin	12	1	12	1
28	MF	(Singapore) Amirul Hakim	1(2)	1	3	1
30	GK	(Singapore) Adib Hakim	0	0	0	0
31	DF	(Singapore) Jacob William Mahler	10	0	10	0
32	FW	(Singapore) Ifwat Ismail	5(8)	1	13	1
	GK	(Singapore) Ridhwan Aban	0	0	0	0
	MF	(Singapore) Irfan Asyraf Aziz	0	0	0	0

== Competitions ==
=== Overview ===
Competition	Record							
Competition	P	W	D	L	GF	GA	GD	Win %
S.League	23	5	6	12	24	43	−19	21.74
Total	23	5	6	12	24	43	−19	21.74

=== Singapore Premier League ===
Win Draw Loss

4 April 2018 Round 1	Young Lions (Singapore)	2–0	(Singapore) Hougang United	Jalan Besar Stadium
	Joshua Pereira 34'; Taufiq Muqminin 68'; Prakash Raj (yellow card) 59'		Antonie Viterale (yellow card) 31'; Nurhilmi Jasni (yellow card) 37'; Iqbal Hussain (yellow card) 81'

8 April 2018 Round 2	Warriors FC (Singapore)	0–1	(Singapore) Young Lions	Choa Chu Kang Stadium
	Ammirul Emmran (yellow card) 41'; Emmeric Ong (yellow card) 52'; Delwinder Singh (yellow card) 77' (yellow card) 87' (yellow-red card)		Irfan Fandi 53'; Joshua Pereira (yellow card) 34'

11 April 2018 Round 3	Balestier Khalsa (Singapore)	3–1	(Singapore) Young Lions	Toa Payoh Stadium
	Vedran Mesec 39'; Keegan Linderboom 60'; Sheikh Abdul Hadi 74'		Prakash Raj 66'

9 May 2018 Round 4	Geylang International (Singapore)	1–1	(Singapore) Young Lions	Bedok Stadium
	Shawal Anuar 8'		Ifwat Ismail 81'

16 May 2018 Round 5	Young Lions (Singapore)	1–3	(Singapore) Albirex Niigata	Jalan Besar Stadium
	Naufal Azman 90+4'		Shuhei Hoshino 8' (pen.) 49'; Kodai Sumikawa 90+3'	Referee: Nathan Chan (Singapore)

19 May 2018 Round 6	Hougang United (Singapore)	1–2	(Singapore) Young Lions	Hougang Stadium
	Fabian Kwok 49'; Illyas Lee (yellow card) 75'; Fareez Farhan (yellow card) 78'		Ikhsan Fandi 57'; Naufal Azman 79'

23 May 2018 Round 7	Young Lions (Singapore)	1–1	Brunei DPMM	Jalan Besar Stadium
	Ikhsan Fandi 66'		Adi Said 86'	Referee: Muhammad Zulfiqar (Singapore)

26 May 2018 Round 8	Young Lions (Singapore)	1–1	(Singapore) Warriors FC	Jalan Besar Stadium
	Ikhsan Fandi 72'; Joshua Pereira (yellow card) 43'; Hami Syahin (yellow card) 66'		Jonathan Béhé 37'; Hafiz Sulaiman (yellow card) 58' (yellow card) 68' (yellow-red card); Kento Fukuda (yellow card) 90+4'

30 May 2018 Round 9	Young Lions (Singapore)	0–4	(Singapore) Tampines Rovers	Jalan Besar Stadium
			Fazrul Nawaz 13'; Amirul Adli 71'; Ryutaro Megumi 90+1', 90+3'

3 June 2018 Round 10	Tampines Rovers (Singapore)	3–1	(Singapore) Young Lions	Our Tampines Hub
	Yasir Hanapi 19', 27'; Khairul Amri 90+2'		Ikhsan Fandi 31'	Referee: Y.Sathyakumar (Singapore)

6 June 2018 Round 11	Home United (Singapore)	4–1	(Singapore) Young Lions	Bishan Stadium
	Shakir Hamzah 2'; Iqram Rifqi 45'; Song Ui-young 55' (pen.); Izzdin Shafiq 85'		Amirul Hakim 15'	Referee: Ahmad A'Qashah (Singapore)

10 June 2018 Round 12	Young Lions (Singapore)	0–2	(Singapore) Balestier Khalsa	Jalan Besar Stadium
			Huzaifah Aziz 43'; Akbar Shah 78'	Referee: G.Letchman (Singapore)

15 August 2018 Round 13 (Rescheduled)	Young Lions (Singapore)	1–1	Brunei DPMM	Jalan Besar Stadium
	Ikhsan Fandi 50' (pen.)		Shahrazen Said 46'

23 June 2018 Round 14	Young Lions (Singapore)	1–1	(Singapore) Home United	National Stadium, Singapore
	Haiqal Pashia 6'; Zulqarnaen Suzliman (red card) 73'		Iqram Rifqi 89'

4 July 2018 Round 15	Young Lions (Singapore)	1–3	(Singapore) Geylang International	Jalan Besar Stadium
	Haiqal Pashia 59'; R Aaravin (red card) 67'		Shawal Anuar 38'; Ryan Syaffiq 66'; Fairoz Hasan 70'	Referee: Muhammad Zulfiqar (Singapore)

11 July 2018 Round 16	Home United (Singapore)	2–0	(Singapore) Young Lions	Jalan Besar Stadium
	Shahril Ishak (penalty missed) 12; Amy Recha 19'; Hafiz Nor 27'

14 July 2018 Round 17	Young Lions (Singapore)	3–0	(Singapore) Hougang United	Jalan Besar Stadium
	Hami Syahin 23'; Haiqal Pashia 83'; Ikhsan Fandi 90'; R Aaravin (yellow card) 10'		Jordan Vestering (yellow card) 38' (yellow card) 83' (yellow-red card); Illyas Lee (yellow card) 49'	Referee: Muhammad Zulfiqar (Singapore)

18 July 2018 Round 18	Albirex Niigata (S) (Singapore)	5–1	(Singapore) Young Lions	Jurong East Stadium
	Kenya Takahashi 34'; Taku Morinaga 38', 80'; Shuhei Hoshino 69'; Daiki Asaoka 90'		Hami Syahin 32'	Referee: Y.Sathyakumar (Singapore)

22 July 2018 Round 19	Warriors FC (Singapore)	1–0	(Singapore) Young Lions	Choa Chu Kang Stadium
	Kento Fukuda 5'; Fadhil Noh (yellow card) 38'; Ismadi Mukhtar (yellow card) 67'; Jonathan Béhé (yellow card) 70'; Suria Prakash (yellow card) 90+1'		Jacob William Mahler (yellow card) 36'; Hami Syahin (yellow card) 40'; R Aaravin (yellow card) 63'; Zulqarnaen Suzliman (yellow card) 84'	Referee: Juherman Zaiton (Singapore)

1 August 2018 Round 20	Young Lions (Singapore)	2–1	(Singapore) Tampines Rovers	Jalan Besar Stadium
	Ikhsan Fandi 41'; Irfan Fandi 89'		Amirul Adli 27'	Referee: W. Ravisanthiran (Singapore)

15 September 2018 Round 21	Young Lions (Singapore)	1–3	(Singapore) Albirex Niigata (S)	Jalan Besar Stadium
	Yosuke Nozawa 21' (o.g.); Hami Syahin (yellow card) 13'; Syed Firdaus Hassan (yellow card) 39'; Irfan Fandi (yellow card) 59'		Kenya Takahashi 1'; Shun Kumagai 16'; Hiroyoshi Kamata 47'; Taku Morinaga (yellow card) 19'; Shuhei Sasahara (yellow card) 79'	Referee: Muhammad Zulfiqar (Singapore)

22 September 2018 Round 22	Geylang International (Singapore)	2–2	(Singapore) Young Lions	Bedok Stadium
	Yeo Hai Ngee 49' 57'; Ryan Syaffiq (yellow card) 55'; Fumiya Kogure (yellow card) 85'		R Aaravin 56'; Ikhsan Fandi 90+4'; Jacob Mahler (yellow card) 87'	Referee: Nathan Chan (Singapore)

12 August 2018 Round 23 (Rescheduled)	Balestier Khalsa (Singapore)	1–0	(Singapore) Young Lions	Toa Payoh Stadium
	Keegan Linderboom 37'

9 October 2018 Round 24 (Rescheduled)	Brunei DPMM	3–1	(Singapore) Young Lions	Hassanal Bolkiah National Stadium
	Adi Said 52'; Volodymyr Pryyomov 65'; Azwan Ali Rahman 71'		Hami Syahin 69'

Pos	Team	Pld	W	D	L	GF	GA	GD	Pts
5	Warriors FC	24	7	7	10	32	35	−3	28
6	Balestier Khalsa	24	7	6	11	25	36	−11	27
7	Young Lions (Note: The two foreign clubs – Albirex Niigata (S) and DPMM FC – as well as the Football Association of Singapore (FAS) under-21 team, Young Lions, are ineligible for any AFC competition spots.)	24	5	6	13	25	46	−21	21
8	Geylang International	24	5	5	14	26	57	−31	20
9	Hougang United	24	2	6	16	22	44	−22	12

Updated to match(es) played on 29 September 2018. Source: Singapore Premier League
Rules for classification: 1) points; 2) goal difference; 3) number of goals scored; 4) number of wins

== See also ==
- 2017 Garena Young Lions FC season
