= 2017 Young Lions FC season =

Garena Young Lions
2017 season
- Chairman: Farehan Hussein
- Head coach: Vincent Subramaniam
- Stadium: Jalan Besar Stadium
- S.League: Not started
- Singapore Cup: Not started
Home colours	Away colours

The 2017 season was Young Lion's 15th consecutive season in the top flight of Singapore football and in the S.League.

== Squad ==
=== S.League squad ===
As of 26 Feb 2017.

Squad No.	Name	Nationality	Date of birth (age)	Last club
Goalkeepers
1	Fashah Iskandar	(Singapore)	15 February 1995 (age 31)	(Singapore) Tampines Rovers Prime League
18	Zharfan Rohaizad	(Singapore)	21 February 1997 (age 29)	(Singapore) NFA U18
30	Adib Hakim	(Singapore)	9 March 1998 (age 28)	(Singapore) NFA U18
35	Hairul Syirhan	(Singapore)	21 August 1995 (age 31)	(Singapore) Geylang International
Defenders
4	Amirul Adli	(Singapore)	13 January 1996 (age 30)	(Singapore) NFA U18
5	Shahrin Saberin	(Singapore)	14 February 1995 (age 31)	(Singapore) Home United
8	Yeo Hai Ngee	(Singapore)	12 January 1995 (age 31)	(Singapore) Home United Prime League
12	Syahrul Sazali	(Singapore)	3 June 1998 (age 28)	(Singapore) NFA U18
15	Faizal Roslan	(Singapore)	30 May 1995 (age 31)	(Singapore) NFA U18
16	J.Dhukilan	(Singapore)	24 March 1997 (age 29)	(Singapore) Geylang International
24	R Aaravin	(Singapore)	24 February 1996 (age 30)	(Singapore) Home United
25	Rusyaidi Salime	(Singapore)	25 April 1998 (age 28)	(Singapore) NFA U17
26	Illyas Lee	(Singapore)	1 December 1995 (age 30)	(Singapore) Warriors FC
27	Taufiq Muqminin Hossain	(Singapore)	26 July 1996 (age 30)	(Singapore) NFA U18
Midfielders
3	Joshua Pereira	(Singapore)	10 October 1997 (age 28)	(Singapore) NFA U18
6	Ammirul Emmran	(Singapore)	18 April 1995 (age 31)	(Singapore) NFA U18
7	Ryan Syaffiq	(Singapore)	1 January 1997 (age 29)	(Singapore) NFA U18
10	Zulqarnaen Suzliman	(Singapore)	29 March 1998 (age 28)	(Singapore) NFA U17
13	Armin Maier	(Singapore) (Malaysia) (Germany)	10 July 1997 (age 29)	(Germany) FC 07 Albstadt
19	Hafiz Sulaiman	(Singapore)	10 October 1995 (age 30)	(Singapore) Warriors FC
20	Muhaimin Suhaimi	(Singapore)	20 February 1995 (age 31)	(Singapore) NFA U18
21	Jordan Chan	(Singapore)	5 March 1998 (age 28)	(Singapore) NFA U18
22	Haiqal Pashia	(Singapore)	29 November 1998 (age 27)	(Singapore) NFA U18
23	Amirul Hakim	(Singapore)	4 June 1998 (age 28)	(Singapore) NFA U18
28	Muhelmy Suhaimi	(Singapore)	22 January 1996 (age 30)	(Singapore) NFA U18
Forwards
9	Taufik Suparno	(Singapore)	31 October 1995 (age 30)	(Singapore) Tampines Rovers Prime League
11	Shafeeq Faruk	(Singapore)	21 September 1996 (age 30)	(Singapore) Geylang International
14	Hami Syahin	(Singapore)	16 December 1998 (age 27)	(Singapore) NFA U16
17	Ikhsan Fandi	(Singapore) (South Africa)	9 April 1999 (age 27)	(Singapore) Home United Prime League
31	Shameer Aziq	(Singapore)	30 December 1995 (age 30)	(Singapore) Hougang United

== Coaching staff ==
Position	Name
Team Manager	(Singapore) Farehan Hussein
Head team coach	(Singapore) Vincent Subramaniam
Assistant coach	(Netherlands) Robbie Servais
Goalkeeping coach	(Singapore) Chua Lye Heng
Physiotherapist	Vacant
Sports Trainers	(Singapore) Nasruldin Baharudin (Singapore) Muklis Sawit
Equipment Officer	(Singapore) Omar Mohamed

== Transfers ==
=== Pre-season transfers ===
==== In ====
Position	Player	Transferred From	Ref
GK	(Singapore) Hairul Syirhan	(Singapore) Geylang International	
GK	(Singapore) Adib Hakim	(Singapore) NFA U18	
DF	(Singapore) R Aaravin	(Singapore) Home United	
DF	(Singapore) Shahrin Saberin	(Singapore) Home United	loan
DF	(Singapore) Yeo Hai Ngee	(Singapore) Home United Prime League	
DF	(Singapore) Ehvin Sasidharan	(Singapore) NFA U18	
DF	(Singapore) Syahrul Sazali	(Singapore) NFA U18	
MF	(Singapore) Hafiz Sulaiman	(Singapore) Warriors FC	
MF	(Singapore) Jordan Chan	(Singapore) NFA U18	
MF	(Singapore) Haiqal Pashia	(Singapore) NFA U18	
MF	(Singapore) Amirul Hakim	(Singapore) NFA U18	
MF	(Singapore) (Malaysia) (Germany) Armin Maier	(Germany) FC 07 Albstadt	
FW	(Singapore) Ikhsan Fandi	(Singapore) Home United Prime League	

==== Out ====
Position	Player	Transferred To	Ref
GK	(Singapore) Kenji Syed Rusydi	(Singapore) Home United Prime League	
GK	(France) Benjamin Bertrand	(France)	
DF	(Singapore) Marcus Wheeler	Released	
DF	(Singapore) Irfan Asyraf	Released	
DF	(Singapore) Tajeli Selamat	(Singapore) Balestier Khalsa	
DF	(Singapore) Shannon Stephen	(Singapore) Tampines Rovers	
DF	(Singapore) Zakir Samsudin	Released	
DF	(Singapore) Ashrul Syafeeq	(Singapore) Balestier Khalsa	
MF	(Singapore) Firdaus Kasman	(Singapore) Warriors	
MF	(Singapore) Christopher van Huizen	(Singapore) Home United	
MF	(Singapore) Fareez Farhan	(Singapore) Hougang United	
MF	(Singapore) Gareth Low	(Singapore) Hougang United	
MF	(Singapore) Jonathan Tan	(Singapore) Balestier Khalsa	
MF	(Singapore) Zulfadhmi Suzliman	(Singapore) Tampines Rovers Prime League	
FW	(Singapore) Khairul Amri	(Singapore) Tampines Rovers	
FW	(Singapore) Adam Swandi	(Singapore) Home United	
FW	(Singapore) Hazim Faiz	Released	

==== Retained ====
Position	Player	Ref
GK	(Singapore) Zharfan Rohaizad	
GK	(Singapore) Fashah Iskandar	
DF	(Singapore) Amirul Adli	
DF	(Singapore) Faizal Roslan	
DF	(Singapore) J.Dhukilan	
DF	(Singapore) Rusyaidi Salime	
DF	(Singapore) Illyas Lee	
DF	(Singapore) Taufiq Muqminin Hossain	
MF	(Singapore) Joshua Pereira	
MF	(Singapore) Ammirul Emmran	
MF	(Singapore) Ryan Syaffiq	
MF	(Singapore) Zulqarnaen Suzliman	
MF	(Singapore) Muhaimin Suhaimi	
MF	(Singapore) Muhelmy Suhaimi	
FW	(Singapore) Taufik Suparno	
FW	(Singapore) Shafeeq Faruk	
FW	(Singapore) Hami Syahin	
FW	(Singapore) Shameer Aziq	

=== Mid-season transfers ===
==== Out ====
Position	Player	Transferred To	Ref
DF	(Singapore) Ehvin Sasidharan	(Singapore) Tampines Rovers	

== Friendlies ==
=== Pre-season friendlies ===
Win Draw Loss

22 January 2017 Pre-Season Friendly	Young Lions (Singapore)	1–1	(Singapore) Geylang International	Jalan Besar Stadium
5.30pm	Goal		Amy Recha

25 January 2017 Pre-Season Friendly	Young Lions (Singapore)	0–1	(Japan) Omiya Ardija Youth	Jalan Besar Stadium
7.30pm

6 February 2017 Pre-Season Friendly	Young Lions (Singapore)	0–1	(Philippines) Ceres–Negros	Hougang Stadium
8pm

10 February 2017 Pre-Season Friendly	Young Lions (Singapore)	3–1	(Australia) Rydalmere Lions FC	Jalan Besar Stadium

11 February 2017 Pre-season	Young Lions (Singapore)	2–0	(Singapore) Balestier Khalsa	Toa Payoh Stadium

=== In Season friendlies ===
15 March 2017 Friendly	Young Lions (Singapore)	cancelled	(Japan) Albirex Niigata U18	Choa Chu Kang Stadium

24 March 2017 Friendly	Young Lions (Singapore)	0–8	(Singapore) Albirex Niigata (S)	Jurong East Stadium
		Report	Yasutaka Yanagi 7'; Tsubasa Sano 8', 44'; Kento Nagasaki 15', 37'; Ryota Nakai 17', 29'; Shoichiro Sakamoto 61'

11 October 2017 Friendly	Albirex Niigata (S) (Singapore)	1–0	(Singapore) Young Lions	Jurong East Stadium
	Yasutaka Yanagi 61'

== Team statistics ==
=== Appearances and goals ===
Numbers in parentheses denote appearances as substitute.

No.	Pos.	Player	Sleague		Total	
No.	Pos.	Player	Apps.	Goals	Apps.	Goals
1	GK	(Singapore) Fashah Iskandar	2	0	2	0
3	MF	(Singapore) Joshua Pereira	1(3)	0	4	0
4	DF	(Singapore) Amirul Adli	21(1)	1	22	1
5	DF	(Singapore) Shahrin Saberin (captain)	15	0	15	0
6	MF	(Singapore) Ammirul Emmran	10(4)	0	14	0
7	MF	(Singapore) Ryan Syaffiq	10(2)	0	12	0
8	DF	(Singapore) Yeo Hai Ngee	7(4)	1	11	1
9	FW	(Singapore) Taufik Suparno	16(4)	2	20	2
10	MF	(Singapore) Zulqarnaen Suzliman	11(8)	1	19	1
11	FW	(Singapore) Shafeeq Faruk	1(1)	0	2	0
12	DF	(Singapore) Syahrul Sazali	17(3)	0	20	0
13	MF	(Malaysia) Armin Maier	3(1)	1	4	1
14	MF	(Singapore) Hami Syahin	19	0	19	0
15	DF	(Singapore) Faizal Roslan	13(5)	0	18	0
16	DF	(Singapore) J.Dhukilan	5(1)	0	6	0
17	FW	(Singapore) Ikhsan Fandi	4(6)	0	10	0
18	GK	(Singapore) Zharfan Rohaizad	14	0	14	0
19	MF	(Singapore) Hafiz Sulaiman	6(2)	0	8	0
20	MF	(Singapore) Muhaimin Suhaimi	15(1)	1	16	1
21	MF	(Singapore) Jordan Chan	8(4)	0	12	0
22	MF	(Singapore) Haiqal Pashia	8(7)	1	15	1
23	MF	(Singapore) Amirul Hakim	0	0	0	0
24	DF	(Singapore) R Aaravin	0	0	0	0
25	DF	(Singapore) Rusyaidi Salime	22	1	22	1
26	DF	(Singapore) Illyas Lee (vice-captain)	13	0	13	0
27	DF	(Singapore) Taufiq Muqminin Hossain	0(1)	0	1	0
28	MF	(Singapore) Muhelmy Suhaimi	15(1)	1	16	1
30	GK	(Singapore) Adib Hakim	0	0	0	0
31	FW	(Singapore) Shameer Aziq	0(5)	0	5	0
35	GK	(Singapore) Hairul Syirhan	8(1)	0	9	0
Players who have played this season but had left the club or on loan to other club
29	DF	(Singapore) Ehvin Sasidharan	0	0	0	0

== Competitions ==
=== S.League ===
Win Draw Loss

27 February 2017 Round 1	Home United (Singapore)	6–1	(Singapore) Young Lions	Bishan Stadium
	Faris Ramli 23' (penalty missed) 58; Stipe Plazibat 29', 40', 55', 75'; Khairul Nizam 61'; Song Ui-young (yellow card) 73'; Adam Swandi (yellow card) 78'	Report	Zulqarnaen Suzliman 51'; Hami Syahin (yellow card) 69'; Shahrin Saberin (yellow card) 81'	Referee: Nathan Chan

4 March 2017 Round 2	Young Lions (Singapore)	0–5	(Singapore) Albirex Niigata (S)	Jalan Besar Stadium
	Tsubasa Sano 16', 75'; Takuya Akiyama 18'; Kento Nagasaki 38'; Ryota Nakai 57'		Hami Syahin (yellow card) 30'; Muhelmy Suhaimi (yellow card) 52'	Attendance: 1,728; Referee: Jansen Foo

11 March 2017 Round 3	Hougang United (Singapore)	2–0	(Singapore) Young Lions	Hougang Stadium
	Fareez Farhan 45'; Fumiya Kogure 63'; Zulfahmi Arifin (yellow card) 56'; Nazrul Nazari (yellow card) 65'		Ammirul Emmran (yellow card) 62'	Attendance: 1,354; Referee: G Letchman

2 April 2017 Round 4	Balestier Khalsa (Singapore)	1–0	(Singapore) Young Lions	Toa Payoh Stadium
	Aung Kyaw Naing 52'; Ahmad Syahir (yellow card) 25'; Nanda Lin Kyaw Chit (yellow card) 28'		Amirul Adli (yellow card) 69'; Shahrin Saberin (yellow card) 90'	Attendance: 868; Referee: Farhad Mohamed

8 April 2017 Round 5	Warriors FC (Singapore)	4–3	(Singapore) Young Lions	Choa Chu Kang Stadium
	Joël Tshibamba 46', 90' (yellow card) 90'; Shahril Ishak 82'; Jordan Webb 87'; Syaqir Sulaiman (yellow card) 13'; Baihakki Khaizan (yellow card) 63'; Poh Yi Feng (yellow card) 66'		Muhaimin Suhaimi 51'; Taufik Suparno 54' (pen.) 78'; Jordan Chan (yellow card) 57'; Shahrin Saberin (yellow card) 79'; Zulqarnaen Suzliman (yellow card) 87'; Hami Syahin (yellow card) 87'	Attendance: 1,608; Referee: Sukhbir Singh

15 April 2017 Round 6	Young Lions (Singapore)	0–2	(Singapore) Geylang International	Jalan Besar Stadium
	Jordan Chan (yellow card) 51'; Muhelmy Suhaimi (yellow card) 55'; Syahrul Sazali (yellow card) 86'	Report	Stanely Ng 64'; Shawal Anuar 75'; Anders Eric Aplin (yellow card) 56'; Ricardo Sendra (yellow card) 83'	Attendance: 1,764; Referee: Nathan Chan

23 April 2017 Round 7	Tampines Rovers (Singapore)	1–0	(Singapore) Young Lions	Jurong West Stadium
	Khairul Amri 90+4' (yellow card) 90' (yellow card) 90+4' (yellow-red card); Son Yong Chan (yellow card) 33'; Daniel Bennett (yellow card) 76'; Shahdan Sulaiman (yellow card) 83'; Zulfadmi Suzliman (yellow card) 88'		Muhelmy Suhaimi (yellow card) 61'

13 May 2017 Round 8	Young Lions (Singapore)	0–0	Brunei DPMM	Jalan Besar Stadium
	Taufik Suparno (yellow card) 90'		Rosmin Kamis (yellow card) 49'; Yura Indera Putera (yellow card) 85'	Attendance: 1,371; Referee: Sukhbir Singh

21 May 2017 Round 9	Young Lions (Singapore)	1–2	(Singapore) Home United	Jalan Besar Stadium
	Muhelmy Suhaimi 58' (yellow card) 41'; Joshua Pereira (yellow card) 77'		Faris Ramli (penalty missed) 7 Stipe Plazibat 12'; Khairul Nizam 49'; Adam Swandi (yellow card) 44'; Shamil Sharif (yellow card) 77'; Abdil Qaiyyim (yellow card) 84'	Attendance: 1,587; Referee: Farhad Mohamed

26 May 2017 Round 10	Albirex Niigata (S) (Singapore)	8–0	(Singapore) Young Lions	Jurong East Stadium
	Tsubasa Sano 6' 36' 77' 78' 90'; Kento Nagasaki 9' 73'; Ryota Nakai 17'		Shahrin Saberin (yellow card) 66'; Taufik Suparno (penalty missed) 90	Referee: Ahmad A'Qashah

22 June 2017 Round 11 (Rescheduled)	Young Lions (Singapore)	0–0	(Singapore) Balestier Khalsa	Jalan Besar Stadium
	Muhelmy Suhaimi (yellow card) 64'; Hami Syahin (yellow card) 71'		Hanafi Salleh (yellow card) 35'; Tajeli Salamat (yellow card) 43' (red card) 2'	Attendance: 1,053; Referee: Nathan Chan

28 June 2017 Round 12	Young Lions (Singapore)	0–0	(Singapore) Warriors FC	Jalan Besar Stadium
			Syaqir Sulaiman (yellow card) 75'	Attendance: 1,337; Referee: W Ravisanthiran

2 July 2017 Round 13	Geylang International (Singapore)	2–1	(Singapore) Young Lions FC	Jalan Besar Stadium
	Amy Recha 67' (pen.) (yellow card) 72'; Victor Coto 76'; Isa Halim (yellow card) 33'; Ricardo Sendra (yellow card) 90'		Amirul Adli 82'; Illyas Lee (yellow card) 77'; Hami Syahin (yellow card) 89'; Taufik Suparno (yellow card) 90'	Referee: Jansen Foo

8 September 2017 Round 14	Young Lions (Singapore)	0–1	(Singapore) Albirex Niigata (S)	Jalan Besar Stadium
			Shuto Inaba 33'; Tsubasa Sano (red card) 51'	Attendance: 1,592; Referee: Farhad Mohd

12 September 2017 Round 15	Young Lions (Singapore)	0–4	(Singapore) Tampines Rovers	Jalan Besar Stadium
	Haiqal Pashia (yellow card) 47'; Muhaimin Suhaimi (yellow card) 72'		Shannon Stephen 16', 58' (yellow card) 50'; Ivan Jakov Džoni 37', 78' (yellow card) 72'	Attendance: 1,323; Referee: G Letchman

15 September 2017 Round 16	Hougang United (Singapore)	2–1	(Singapore) Young Lions	Hougang Stadium
	Pablo Rodríguez 1'; Nurhilmi Jasni 17' (yellow card) 44'; Delwinder Singh (yellow card) 26'; Syahiran Miswan (yellow card) 36' (yellow card) 73' (yellow-red card)		Rusyaidi Salime (yellow card) 37'	Attendance: 650; Referee: Ahmad A'Qashah

20 September 2017 Round 17	Young Lions (Singapore)	0–1	(Singapore) Balestier Khalsa	Jalan Besar Stadium
			Huzaifah Aziz 66'; Tajeli Salamat (yellow card) 55'; Ahmad Syahir (yellow card) 71'; Raihan Rahman (penalty missed) 3 (yellow card) 82'; Aung Kyaw Naing (yellow card) 85'; Hanafi Akbar (yellow card) 90'	Attendance: 1,136; Referee: G Letchman

7 October 2017 Round 18	Brunei DPMM	7–1	(Singapore) Young Lions	Hassanal Bolkiah National Stadium
	Rafael Ramazotti 45', 50', 54'; Adi Said 53', 69', 80'; Daud Jared Alvarez 64'; Vincent Reyes (yellow card) 34'; Rosmin Kamis (yellow card) 41'; Hendra Azam (yellow card) 76'; Haizul Rani (yellow card) 77'		Armin Maier 78'; Shahrin Saberin (yellow card) 42'; Hami Syahin (yellow card) 76'; Hafiz Sulaiman (yellow card) 90'	Attendance: 499; Referee: Ahmad A'Qashah

14 October 2017 Round 19	Warriors FC (Singapore)	0–1	(Singapore) Young Lions	Choa Chu Kang Stadium
	Ho Wai Loon (yellow card) 90'		Haiqal Pashia 63'	Attendance: 1,608; Referee: W Ravisanthiran

21 October 2017 Round 20	Young Lions (Singapore)	0–4	(Singapore) Geylang International	Jalan Besar Stadium
			Shahfiq Ghani 15'; Víctor Coto Ortega 38'; Faritz Abdul Hameed 51'; Shawal Anuar 71'; Anders Aplin (yellow card) 20'	Referee: Ahmad A'Qashah

24 October 2017 Round 21	Young Lions (Singapore)	0–1	(Singapore) Hougang United	Jalan Besar Stadium
	Amirul Adli (yellow card) 28'		Justin Hui 60'; Faiz Salleh (yellow card) 41'	Referee: Sukhbir Singh

28 October 2017 Round 22	Tampines Rovers (Singapore)	3–0	(Singapore) Young Lions FC	Our Tampines Hub
	Shannon Stephen 8'; Hafiz Abu Sujad 77'; Daniel Bennett 82'			Referee: Jansen Foo

31 October 2017 Round 23	Home United (Singapore)	4–0	(Singapore) Young Lions	Bishan Stadium
	Adam Swandi 33'; Faris Ramli 40'; Irfan Fandi 74'; Stipe Plazibat 90'

18 November 2017 Round 24	Young Lions (Singapore)	1–2	Brunei DPMM	Jalan Besar Stadium
	Yeo Hai Ngee 22' (pen.); Hami Syahin (yellow card) 81'		Azwan Ali 5'; Rafael Ramazotti 24'; Rosmin Kamis (yellow card) 45'; Yura Indera Putera (yellow card) 48'; Hazwan Hamzah (yellow card) 72'; Abdul Mu'iz Sisa (yellow card) 87'	Referee: Farhad Mohamed

Pos	Team	Pld	W	D	L	GF	GA	GD	Pts
5	Warriors FC	24	9	7	8	33	36	−3	34
6	Hougang United	24	9	3	12	24	31	−7	30
7	Balestier Khalsa	24	5	4	15	17	33	−16	19
8	(Brunei) DPMM FC (Note: The two foreign clubs – Albirex Niigata (S) and DPMM FC – as well as the Football Association of Singapore (FAS) under-21 team, Young Lions, are not eligible for any AFC competition spots.)	24	5	2	17	30	61	−31	17
9	(Singapore) Young Lions	24	1	3	20	10	62	−52	6

Source: S.League
Rules for classification: 1) points; 2) goal difference; 3) number of goals scored; 4) number of wins
