= Singapore national youth football team =

Singapore national youth football team may refer to:

- Singapore national under-16 football team
- Singapore national under-19 football team
- Singapore national under-21 football team
- Singapore national under-22 football team
- Singapore national under-23 football team
