= Firdaus Kassim =

Singaporean football manager

Personal information
- Full name: Firdaus Bin Mohamed Kassim
- Date of birth: 7 July 1987 (age 39)
- Place of birth: Singapore

Team information
- Current team: Young Lions (Head coach)

Managerial career
- Years: Team
- 2015: Hougang United U18
- 2016: Chainat Hornbill (assistant)
- 2016: Singapore (assistant)
- 2018: Muangthong United (assistant)
- 2018–2019: Laos (assistant)
- 2019: Chainat Hornbill (assistant)
- 2020–2022: Hougang United (assistant)
- 2022–2023: Hougang United
- 2023: Hougang United U18
- 2024–2025: Lion City Sailors U21
- 2025–: Singapore U23
- 2025–: Young Lions

Firdaus Bin Mohamed Kassim is a Singaporean football manager who currently is the head coach of Singapore Premier League club Young Lions and also the Singapore national under-23 team.

== Managerial career ==
=== Early years ===
While still holding an AFC ‘B’ Coaching License, Firdaus was the head coach of Football Association of Singapore COE group from 2009 to 2013. In January 2013, Firdaus was offered the role of assistant coach at Woodlands Wellington U14 team. In 2014, FAS offered him an assistant coach contract with Singapore national team U14 team

After receiving his AFC ‘A’ Coaching License in 2015, Firdaus took up a role as assistant coach at Hougang United U18 team.

=== Chainat Hornbill ===
In 2016, Firdaus was appointed assistant manager of Thai League 1 side Chainat Hornbill where he has worked under head coach Worakorn Wichanarong, Koichi Sugiyama, Ithsara Sritaro and Dennis Amato at the club.

=== Singapore ===
In November 2016, Firdaus was appointed the assistant coach of Singapore under Varadaraju Sundramoorthy for the friendly match against Qatar and the 2022 FIFA World Cup qualification match against Yemen.

=== Muangthong United ===
On 5 January 2018, Firdaus was appointed by Thai League 1 club Muangthong United as their assistant manager.

=== Laos ===
In November 2018, Firdaus was appointed as the assistant coach of Laos reuniting with head coach Varadaraju Sundramoorthy.

=== Chainat Hornbill ===
In 2019, Firdaus returned to his second stint as assistant manager at Chainat Hornbill where he worked under Dennis Amato again at the club.

=== Hougang United ===
In January 2020, Firdaus was appointed by Hougang United to be their assistant manager under manager Clement Teo.

On 22 October 2022, Firdaus got promoted to manager after Clement Teo left the club to joined Angkor Tiger in Cambodia in which Firdaus helped the club to win the 2022 Singapore Cup where it was Hougang United first major trophy.

On 17 April 2023, Kassim was demoted to Hougang United youth team after failing to win any matches since they won the opening match in the 2023 Singapore Premier League season. Marko Kraljević, the head of youth at Hougang United took over as interim head coach.

=== Lion City Sailors ===
In January 2024, Firdaus was appointed as the head of development for Lion City Sailors academy.

On 9 July 2024, Firdaus was appointed as the manager of the U21 side with immediate effect. They were crowned 2024–25 Singapore Premier League U21 league champions at the end of the season cruising with an impressive record of 19 wins and 3 draws in 24 league matches.

=== Singapore U23 ===
On 25 June 2025, FAS appointed Firdaus as the new head coach for the Singapore U23 national team where he will focus on the 2025 SEA Games campaign with the squad.

=== Young Lions ===
FAS also appointed Firdaus as the new head coach of the Singapore Premier League club Young Lions on the same day he was appointed as the Singapore U23 head coach.

== Managerial statistics ==
As of match played 14 March 2026

Managerial record by team and tenure
Team	Nat.	From	To	Record					Ref.
Team	Nat.	From	To	G	W	D	L	Win %	Ref.
Hougang United	(Singapore)	22 October 2022	17 April 2023	15	5	2	8	33.33	
Singapore U23	(Singapore)	25 June 2025	Present	5	0	0	5	0.00	
Young Lions	(Singapore)	25 June 2025	Present	14	1	2	11	7.14	
Career Total				34	6	4	24	17.65	

== Honours ==
=== Manager ===
==== Hougang United ====
- Singapore Cup: 2022

==== Lion City Sailors U21 ====
- 2024-25 Singapore Premier League U21 Champions
