= J. Dhukilan =

Singaporean footballer

Personal information
- Full name: Jeevamani s/o Dhukilan
- Date of birth: 24 March 1997 (age 29)
- Place of birth: Singapore
- Height: 1.82 m (6 ft 0 in)
- Position: Defender

Team information
- Current team: Young Lions
- Number: 21

Youth career
- 2012–2014: National Football Academy

Senior career*
Years	Team	Apps	(Gls)
2015	Young Lions FC	15	(0)
2015–2016	Geylang International		

International career
2010–2011	Singapore U16		
2015–2016	Singapore U22	4	(1)
- * Club domestic league appearances and goals as of December 28, 2016

Jeevamani s/o Dhukilan (born 24 March 1997) is a former Singaporean footballer who played as a defender. He represented Singapore at the 2010 Summer Youth Olympics on home soil, winning bronze.

== Career statistics ==
Club	Season	S.League		Singapore Cup		Singapore League Cup		Asia		Total	
Club	Season	Apps	Goals	Apps	Goals	Apps	Goals	Apps	Goals	Apps	Goals
Geylang International	2016	4	0	0	0	0	0	—		4	0
Young Lions	2016	11	0	0	0	0	0	—		11	0
