= Ryan Syaffiq =

Singaporean footballer

Personal information
- Full name: Muhammad Ryan Syaffiq bin Ramli
- Date of birth: 4 March 1995 (age 31)
- Place of birth: Singapore
- Height: 1.74 m (5 ft 9 in)
- Position: Midfielder

Youth career
- 2011: Tanjong Pagar United
- 2012: NFA U17
- 2013: NFA U18

Senior career*
| Years | Team | Apps | (Gls) |
| 2014–2015 | Police SA | | |
| 2016–2017 | Young Lions | 24 | (1) |
| 2018 | Geylang International | 23 | (2) |
| 2019–2021 | Tiong Bahru | | |
| 2022 | Tanjong Pagar United | 3 | (0) |

International career
| 2016– | Singapore U21 | | |
- * Club domestic league appearances and goals as of November 20, 2019

Muhammad Ryan Syaffiq bin Ramli is a Singaporean footballer who played for Geylang International as a midfielder.

He started playing in the S.League for Young Lions FC in 2016.

== Club career ==
=== Young Lions FC ===
He was included in the Young Lions FC team for the 2017 SEA Games, then he was recruited in the Young Lions FC for the 2017 season.

== International career ==
The FAS called-up him in the Singapore U21 team for the friendly matches against Bahrain U21 and China U21.

== Career statistics ==
Update 25 Sept 2019

| Club | Season | S.League | | Singapore Cup | | Singapore League Cup | | Asia | | Total | |
| Club | Season | Apps | Goals | Apps | Goals | Apps | Goals | Apps | Goals | Apps | Goals |
|---|---|---|---|---|---|---|---|---|---|---|---|
| Young Lions FC | 2016 | 12 | 1 | 0 | 0 | 0 | 0 | 0 | 0 | 12 | 1 |
| Young Lions FC | 2017 | 12 | 0 | 0 | 0 | 0 | 0 | 0 | 0 | 12 | 0 |
| Young Lions FC | Total | 24 | 1 | 0 | 0 | 0 | 0 | 0 | 0 | 24 | 1 |
| Geylang International | 2018 | 23 | 2 | 0 | 0 | 0 | 0 | 0 | 0 | 23 | 2 |
| Geylang International | Total | 23 | 2 | 0 | 0 | 0 | 0 | 0 | 0 | 23 | 2 |
| Tanjong Pagar United FC | 2022 | 2 | 0 | 0 | 0 | 0 | 0 | 0 | 0 | 2 | 0 |
| Tanjong Pagar United FC | Total | 2 | 0 | 0 | 0 | 0 | 0 | 0 | 0 | 2 | 0 |
| Career total | | 49 | 3 | 0 | 0 | 0 | 0 | 0 | 0 | 49 | 3 |
