= Armin Maier =

Singaporean-German footballer

Personal information
- Full name: Armin Maier Bin Rafi
- Date of birth: 10 July 1997 (age 29)
- Place of birth: Singapore
- Height: 1.83 m (6 ft 0 in)
- Position: Midfielder

Team information
- Current team: PDRM
- Number: 20

Youth career
- –2015: FC 07 Albstadt

Senior career*
Years	Team	Apps	(Gls)
2016	FC 07 Albstadt	26	(0)
2017	Young Lions	4	(1)
2018	FC Kreuzlingen	10	(2)
2019	Johor Darul Ta'zim II	0	(0)
2020–2021	Selangor II	1	(0)
2022	Víkingur Ólafsvík	4	(0)
2022	SV Heimstetten	1	(0)
2024–	PDRM		
2025–	FC 07 Albstadt		

International career^{‡}
2017–2018	Singapore U23	5	(3)
- * Club domestic league appearances and goals as of 13 August 2022 ‡ National team caps and goals as of 25 August 2019

Armin Maier bin Rafi (born 10 July 1997) is a professional footballer who plays as a midfielder for Malaysia Super League club PDRM. He is a former member of Singapore national under-22 team.

== Club career ==
=== Youth ===
Maier started his career in the German club FC 07 Albstadt in his youth years, having migrated to Germany when he was 5 years old.

=== Young Lions ===
In 2017, he signed with the Singapore club, Garena Young Lions for the 2017 S.League season.

=== Selangor FC II ===
He has officially joined the team Selangor F.C. II on 26 February 2020.

He had a short spell with Víkingur Ólafsvík in the Icelandic third tier in May 2022.

== International career ==
Maier is eligible to play for Singapore due to his mother being a Singaporean. He played for the under-23 side.

He is also eligible to play for either Germany or Malaysia, as he possesses a German passport and his grandfather was from the state of Johor.

== Career statistics ==
As of 26 November 2022

Appearances and goals by club, season and competition
Club	Season	League			Cup		Continental		Other		Total	
Club	Season	Division	Apps	Goals	Apps	Goals	Apps	Goals	Apps	Goals	Apps	Goals
FC 07 Albstadt	2015/16	Verbandsliga Württemberg	26	0	0	0	–		0	0	26	0
Young Lions FC	2017	S.League	4	1	0	0	–		0	0	4	1
FC Kreuzlingen	2018	2. Liga Interregional	10	2	0	0	–		0	0	10	2
Johor Darul Ta'zim II	2019		0	0	0	0	0	0	0	0	0	0
Selangor FA II	2020		1	0	0	0	0	0	0	0	1	0
Víkingur Ólafsvík	2022	2. deild karla	4	0	0	0	0	0	0	0	4	0
SV Heimstetten	2022–23	Regionalliga	1	0	0	0	0	0	0	0	1	0
Career total			46	3	0	0	0	0	0	0	46	3
