= Hami Syahin =

Singaporean footballer (born 1998)

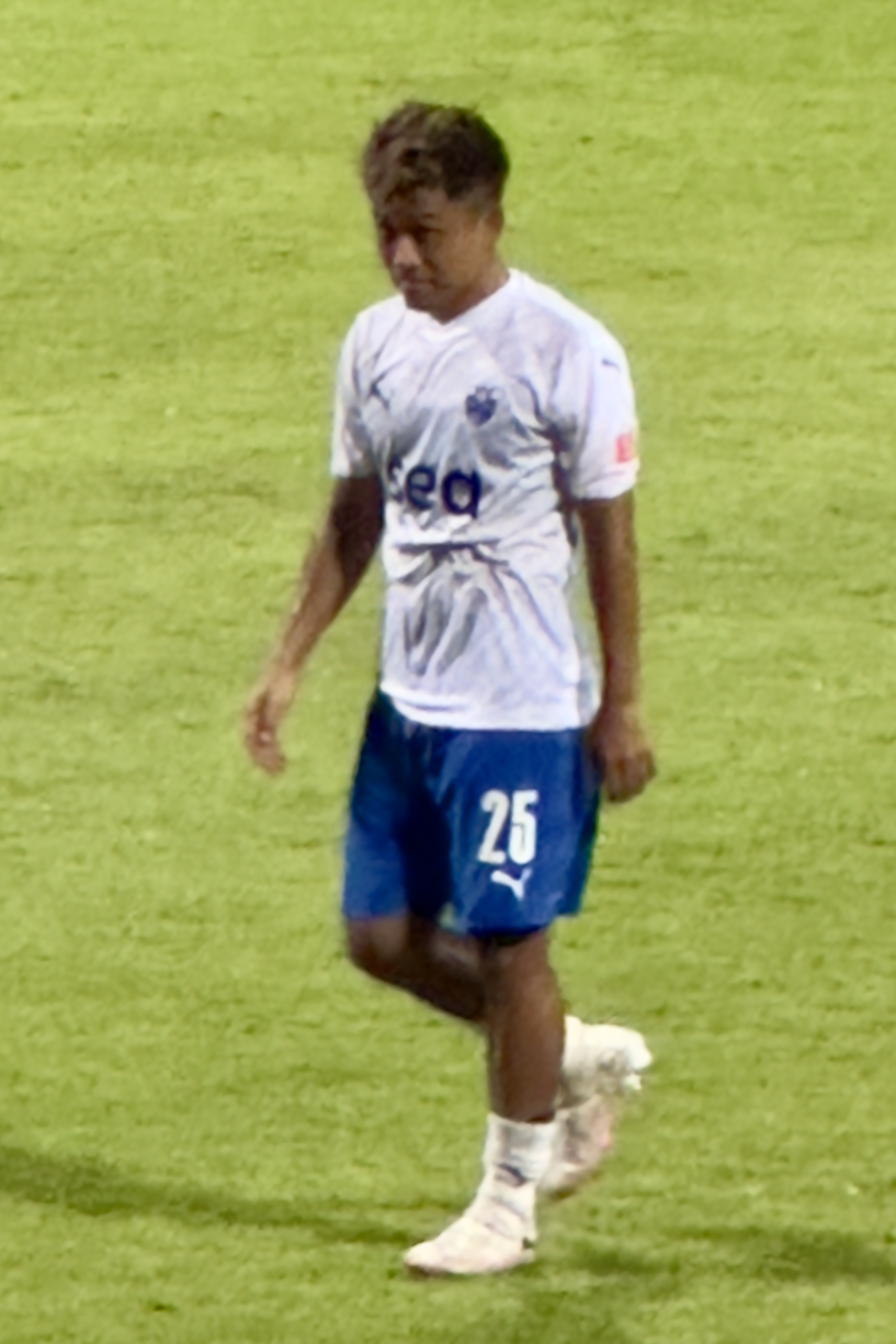
- Hami playing for Lion City Sailors in 2024

Personal information
- Full name: Muhammad Hami Syahin bin Said
- Date of birth: 16 December 1998 (age 27)
- Place of birth: Singapore
- Height: 1.66 m (5 ft 5 1/2 in)
- Positions: Central midfielder; right-back

Team information
- Current team: Lion City Sailors
- Number: 16

Youth career
- National Football Academy

Senior career*
Years	Team	Apps	(Gls)
2015–2018	Young Lions	63	(5)
2019	Lion City Sailors	18	(2)
2020–2021	Young Lions	18	(4)
2022–	Lion City Sailors	80	(3)

International career^{‡}
2015–2017	Singapore U19	13	(3)
2017–2020	Singapore U22	20	(0)
2016–	Singapore	46	(0)
Medal record
Men's football
Representing Singapore
Merlion Cup
Winner	2019 Singapore
- * Club domestic league appearances and goals as of 1 November 2026 ‡ National team caps and goals as of 18 August 2026

Muhammad Hami Syahin bin Said (born 16 December 1998), better known as Hami Syahin or just Hami, is a Singaporean professional footballer who plays either as a central-midfielder or right-back for Singapore Premier League club Lion City Sailors and the Singapore national team.

== Beginnings and breakthrough ==
=== Youth career ===
On 13 March 2015, He was selected for a 10-day training stint in France with Ben Davies and Muhelmy Suhaimi and played in two friendly matches for FC Metz, against RC Strasbourg on their second day there, and FC Sarrebourg, a day before they were scheduled to return home.

== Club career ==
=== Young Lions ===
Hami began his club career with S.League club Young Lions in November 2015. However, he made zero appearance for the club. In the 2016 season, Hami earned his first appearances and played almost all matches throughout the 2016 S.League season. He scored his first goal against Warriors.

=== Home United ===
On 3 February 2019, Hami joined Home United from Young Lions ahead of the 2019 Singapore Premier League season. During Home United's 2019 AFC Cup Group H opening match, Hami scored a long range volley to equalise against Indonesian side PSM Makassar to secure a point with a 1–1 draw.

Hami scored the decisive penalty for Home United in the 2019 Singapore Community Shield. Due to a combination of injuries to Izzdin Shafiq as well as the constant coaching changes, Hami was mainly deployed in the defensive midfield position.

=== Return to Young Lions ===
On 4 November 2020, Hami re-joined his former club, Young Lions as he is serving his compulsory two years National Service.

=== Lion City Sailors ===
In January 2022, Hami joined Lion City Sailors after he completed his National services commitments. On 9 December 2023, he lifted his first ever cup win which is the 2023 Singapore Cup. On 18 June 2024, Hami made his 50th appearance for the club.

Hami played in the 2025 AFC Champions League Two final against Sharjah on 18 May 2025 as the Sailors finished as a runner-up after a 1–2 defeat. During the 2025–26 AFC Champions League Two group stage fixtures against Indonesian club Persib Bandung on 26 November 2025, as the match was at 2–2, Hami composed the ball after defending from a corner and dribble near the half way court punting the ball all the way to the opposition box assisting Anderson Lopes to score the winner in a 3–2 win.

== International career ==
=== Youth ===
Hami was initially selected in the 40 players provisional squad by head coach V. Sundramoorthy for the 2016 AFF Championship. However, he was not included in the final 23 man squad to take part in the competition.

Hami was called up in June 2017 for a closed door friendly against Myanmar on 6 June 2017, 2019 AFC Asian Cup qualification match against Chinese Taipei on 10 June 2017 and a friendly against Argentina on 13 June 2017. Hami was also called up for 2017 Southeast Asian Games.

=== Senior ===
Hami made his official debut for Singapore on 5 September 2019, against Yemen in an eventual 2–2 draw. In 2022, Hami was included in the team for the 2022 FAS Tri-Nations Series and 2022 AFF Championship. On 18 November 2024, Hami captained Singapore during a friendly match against Chinese Taipei.

== Others ==
=== Singapore Selection Squad ===
He was selected as part of the Singapore Selection squad for The Sultan of Selangor's Cup to be held on 6 May 2017.

== Career statistics ==
=== Club ===
As of match played 30 May 2026.. Caps and goals may not be correct.

Club	Season	S.League		Singapore Cup		League Cup Charity Shield		Asia		Total	
Club	Season	Apps	Goals	Apps	Goals	Apps	Goals	Apps	Goals	Apps	Goals
Young Lions	2015	0	0	-	-	-	-	—		0	0
Young Lions	2016	22	2	1	0	-	-	—		23	2
Young Lions	2017	19	0	0	0	0	0	—		19	0
Young Lions	2018	22	3	0	0	0	0	—		22	3
Young Lions	Total	63	5	1	0	0	0	0	0	64	5
Home United	2019	18	2	3	0	-	-	5	1	26	3
Home United	Total	18	2	3	0	0	0	5	1	26	3
Young Lions	2020	5	0	0	0	-	-	0	0	5	0
Young Lions	2021	13	4	0	0	-	-	0	0	13	4
Young Lions	Total	18	4	0	0	0	0	0	0	18	4
Lion City Sailors	2022	10	1	1	0	0	0	1	0	12	1
Lion City Sailors	2023	23	2	5	0	0	0	4	0	32	2
Lion City Sailors	2024–25	27	0	7	0	1	0	15 (Note: 5 in ASEAN Club Championship and 10 in AFC Champions League Two)	0	50	0
Lion City Sailors	2025–26	18	0	3	1	1	0	7 (Note: 4 in ASEAN Club Championship and 3 in AFC Champions League Two)	0	29	1
Lion City Sailors	2026–27	0	0	0	0	0	0	0	0	0	0
Lion City Sailors	Total	60	3	13	0	1	0	27	0	123	4
Career total		159	14	17	0	1	0	32	1	231	16

- Young Lions are ineligible for qualification to AFC competitions in their respective leagues.

=== International ===
==== International caps ====
No	Date	Venue	Opponent	Result	Competition
15	23 March 2023	Mong Kok Stadium, Hong Kong	Hong Kong	1–1 (draw)	Friendly
16	26 March 2023	Macau Olympic Complex Stadium, Macau	Macau	1–0 (won)	Friendly
17	12 Sept 2023	Bishan Stadium, Singapore	Chinese Taipei	3-1 (win)	Friendly

== Honours ==
=== Club ===
==== Lion City Sailors ====
- AFC Champions League Two runner-up: 2024–25
- Singapore Premier League: 2024–25
- Singapore Cup: 2023, 2024–25
- Singapore Community Shield: 2022, 2024; runner-up: 2025

=== International ===
Singapore U22

- Merlion Cup: 2019

=== Individual ===
Singapore Premier League Young Player of the Year: 2019
