= Illyas Lee =

Singaporean footballer (born 1995)

Personal information
- Full name: Illyas Lee Si Qin
- Date of birth: 1 December 1995 (age 30)
- Place of birth: Singapore
- Height: 1.75 m (5 ft 9 in)
- Positions: Defender; defensive midfielder

Team information
- Current team: Balestier Khalsa FC
- Number: 26

Senior career*
Years	Team	Apps	(Gls)
2015	Warriors	2	(0)
2016–2017	Young Lions	13	(0)
2018	Hougang United	21	(2)
2019	Balestier Khalsa	15	(0)
2020	Warriors	0	(0)
2020	Tiong Bahru	0	(0)

International career^{‡}
2017–	Singapore U22	2	(0)
2017–	Singapore U23	1	(0)
- * Club domestic league appearances and goals as of 27 June 2017 ‡ National team caps and goals as of 19 August 2017

Illyas Lee Si Qin (born 1 December 1995) is a Singaporean professional footballer who plays as a defender for Singaporean club Hougang United FC and the Singapore national under-22 football team. He has been described as 'the next N'Golo Kante' due to his affinity on defence.

== Club career ==
Lee started off his footballing career in 2015 when he signed for Warriors but made no appearances for the club.

He then signed for Young Lions in 2016 and did not make any appearances for the club too. He then made his debut in 2017. He even captained the Young Lions against Balestier Khalsa on 22 June 2017.

== Career statistics ==
Update 1 March 2020

Club	Season	S.League		Singapore Cup		Singapore League Cup		Asia		Total	
Club	Season	Apps	Goals	Apps	Goals	Apps	Goals	Apps	Goals	Apps	Goals
Warriors FC	2015	2	0	0	0	0	0	0	0	2	0
Warriors FC	Total	2	0	0	0	0	0	0	0	2	0
Young Lions FC	2016	0	0	0	0	0	0	0	0	0	0
Young Lions FC	2017	13	0	0	0	0	0	0	0	13	0
Young Lions FC	Total	13	0	0	0	0	0	0	0	13	0
Hougang United	2018	21	2	0	0	0	0	0	0	21	2
Hougang United	Total	21	2	0	0	0	0	0	0	21	2
Balestier Khalsa	2019	15	0	0	0	0	0	0	0	15	0
Balestier Khalsa	Total	15	0	0	0	0	0	0	0	15	0
Warriors FC	2020	0	0	0	0	0	0	0	0	0	0
Warriors FC	Total	0	0	0	0	0	0	0	0	0	0
Tiong Bahru FC	2020	0	0	0	0	0	0	0	0	0	0
Tiong Bahru FC	Total	0	0	0	0	0	0	0	0	0	0
Career total		51	2	0	0	0	0	0	0	51	2

== International career ==
Lee represented Singapore for the under-22s national team, and has been appointed as captain of the team on several occasions.

== International Statistics ==
=== U22/23 International caps ===
No	Date	Venue	Opponent	Result	Competition
1	20 June 2018	Jalan Besar Stadium, Singapore	Myanmar	0-2 (lost)	Friendly

=== U19 International caps ===
No	Date	Venue	Opponent	Result	Competition
1	9 September 2013	Gelora Delta Stadium, Sidoarjo, Indonesia	Timor-Leste	1-1 (draw)	2013 AFF U-19 Youth Championship
2	13 September 2013	Gelora Delta Stadium, Sidoarjo, Indonesia	Laos	2-0 (won)	2013 AFF U-19 Youth Championship
3	17 September 2013	Petrokimia Stadium, Gresik, Indonesia	Cambodia	2-3 (lost)	2013 AFF U-19 Youth Championship
