= R. Aaravin =

Singaporean footballer

Personal information
- Full name: Aaravin s/o Rajandran
- Date of birth: 24 February 1996 (age 30)
- Place of birth: Singapore
- Height: 1.83 m (6 ft 0 in)
- Position: Centre-back

Youth career
- 2009–2012: Singapore Sports School
- 2012–2015: Home United

Senior career*
Years	Team	Apps	(Gls)
2015–2017	Home United	17	(0)
2017–2019	Young Lions	12	(1)
2019–2020	Warriors FC	15	(0)
2020–2021	Balestier Khalsa	8	(1)

International career
2011	Singapore U16		
2015	Singapore U22		
- * Club domestic league appearances and goals as of 28 December 2016

Aaravin s/o Rajandran (born 24 February 1996) is a Singaporean former professional footballer who played as a centre-back.

== Club career ==
Aaravin played for Home United (who later became Warriors FC), Young Lions and Balestier Khalsa, retiring at age 25.

== Controversy ==
Aaravin has spoken out against the current under-23 regulations in the Singapore Premier League which makes it mandatory for clubs to sign and field players who are under the age of 23. He has claimed the under-23 rule has actually shortchanged a lot of players. He has also stated he received an offer of only $1200 dollars to play professional football.

== Personal life ==
From 2013 to 2016, Aaravin studied at Nanyang Polytechnic in Sports and Wellness after graduating from the Singapore Sports School in 2012. After his diploma, he served his two years compulsory National Service with the Singapore Police Force from 2016 to 2018. Aaravin holds a degree of Bachelor of Arts from the Singapore Institute of Management.

== Career statistics ==
Club	Season	S.League		Singapore Cup		Singapore League Cup		Asia		Total	
Club	Season	Apps	Goals	Apps	Goals	Apps	Goals	Apps	Goals	Apps	Goals
Home United	2015	13	0	0	0	2	0	—		15	0
Home United	2016	0	0	0	0	0	0	—		0	0
Home United	2017	1	0	0	0	0	0	—		0	0
Home United	2018	11	0	0	0	0	0	—		0	0
Home United	2019	14	0	0	0	0	0	—		0	0

== Honours ==
=== Individual ===
- Dollah Kassim Award recipients : 2012
- Peter Lim Scholarship: 2012
