= Zharfan Rohaizad =

Singaporean footballer

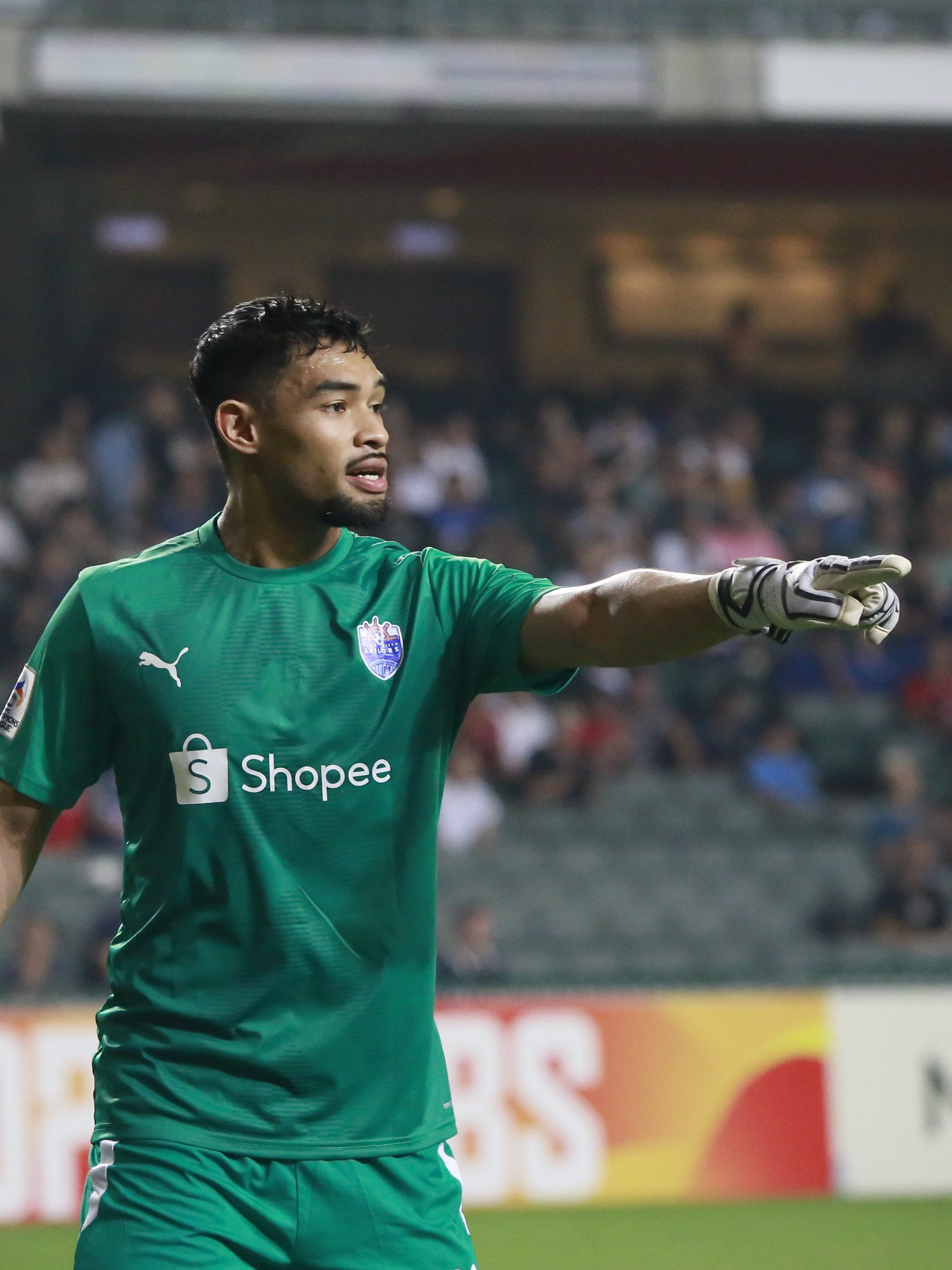
- Zharfan in action for Lion City Sailors in the 2023–24 AFC Champions League

Personal information
- Full name: Muhammad Zharfan bin Rohaizad
- Date of birth: 21 February 1997 (age 29)
- Place of birth: Singapore
- Height: 1.81 m (5 ft 11 in)
- Position: Goalkeeper

Team information
- Current team: Hougang United (on loan from Lion City Sailors)

Youth career
- 2014–2016: National Football Academy

Senior career*
Years	Team	Apps	(Gls)
2016–2019	Young Lions	49	(0)
2021–2022	Tanjong Pagar United	38	(0)
2023–2026	Lion City Sailors	32	(0)
2025–2026	→ Hougang United (loan)	13	(0)
2026–	Tampines Rovers FC	0	(0)

International career
2016–2018	Singapore U21	0	(0)
2018–2019	Singapore U22	22	(0)
2019–	Singapore	0	(0)
Medal record
Men's football
Representing Singapore
Merlion Cup
Winner	2019 Singapore
- * Club domestic league appearances and goals as of 02:14, 23 November 2014 (UTC)

Muhammad Zharfan bin Rohaizad (born 21 February 1997) is a Singaporean professional footballer who plays as a goalkeeper for Singapore Premier League club Tampines Rovers FC, and the Singapore national team.

== Club career ==
Zharfan started his career with the National Football Academy and was drafted into the LionsXII as cover for the team's recent training camp in Yogyakarta, Indonesia in 2014.

=== Young Lions ===
In 2006, Zharfan was drafted to the Garena Young Lions squad and played with the club till the end of the 2019 Singapore Premier League season. Zharfan has been impressive in goal for the Young Lions throughout the 2019 season helping the team finish eighth in the league. His performances even earned him a call up to the senior national team by coach Tatsuma Yoshida.

==== Free agent ====
In 2020, Zharfan was at a crossroads after leaving the Young Lions as he was enlisted into National Service while the coronavirus was starting to cause a global pandemic which leave the suspension of the 2020 Singapore Premier League season, and the then 23-year-old was without a club.

=== Tanjong Pagar United ===
In 7 May 2021, the 2021 Singapore Premier League resumed after the league was suspended due to the COVID-19 pandemic in Singapore, Zharfan signed with Tanjong Pagar United. Zharfan enjoyed a breakout 2022 Singapore Premier League season with Tanjong Pagar United showing he is one of the country’s up-and-coming promising goalkeeper by making the highest number of saves (122) across the league. After 41 games with the Jaguars, Zharfan left the club.

=== Lion City Sailors ===
On 23 December 2022, Zharfan signed with Lion City Sailors. On 26 July 2023, Zharfan make multiples amount of saves in a friendly match against Tottenham Hotspurs at the Singapore National Stadium.

During the 2023–24 AFC Champions League group stage match on 4 October 2023 against Hong Kong side, Kitchee, Zharfan pulled a string of saves which lands him in the 'Team of the Round matchday 2' XI.

Despite Maxime Lestienne's equaliser in the 91st minute of the 2025 AFC Champions League Two final against Sharjah, Zharfan and the Sailors finished as a runner-up after a 1–2 defeat.

==== Loan to Hougang United ====
On 9 July 2025, it was announced that Zharfan would be joining Hougang United on a season long loan deal.

=== Tampines Rovers ===
On 2 July 2026, Tampines Rovers FC announced the signing of Zharfan from Lion City Sailors on a free transfer. He made his debut on 25 July 2026 in a pre-season match against DPMM FC.

== International career ==
=== Youth ===
Zharfan was named Most Valuable Player at the 2015 Vietnam Newspaper Cup tournament.

Zharfan was selected as part of the Singapore Selection squad for The Sultan of Selangor’s Cup held on 24 August 2019.

=== Senior ===
Zharfan was called up to the senior squad for the first time in 2019, for the World Cup qualifiers against Yemen and Palestine on 5 September and 10 September respectively.

Zharfan was named in the 2020 AFF Championship and the 2022 AFF Championship squads yet failed to make a single appearance at both tournaments.

== Personal life ==
Zharfan studied at Singapore Sports School.

== Career statistics ==
=== Club ===
As of match played 20 July 2023

Club	Season	League		National cup		League cup		Continental		Total	
Club	Season	Apps	Goals	Apps	Goals	Apps	Goals	Apps	Goals	Apps	Goals
Young Lions	2016	6	0	—	—	0	0	—		6	0
Young Lions	2017	14	0	0	0	0	0	—		14	0
Young Lions	2018	16	0	0	0	0	0	—		16	0
Young Lions	2019	13	0	0	0	0	0	—		13	0
Young Lions	Total	49	0	0	0	0	0	0	0	49	0
Tanjong Pagar United	2021	13	0	0	0	0	0	—		13	0
Tanjong Pagar United	2022	25	0	3	0	0	0	—		28	0
Tanjong Pagar United	Total	38	0	3	0	0	0	0	0	41	0
Lion City Sailors	2023	24	0	0	0	0	0	6	0	30	0
Lion City Sailors	2024–25	9	0	0	0	7	0	1	0	17	0
Lion City Sailors	Total	33	0	0	0	7	0	7	0	47	0
Hougang United (loan)	2025–26	13	0	0	0	3	0	—		16	0
Hougang United (loan)	Total	13	0	0	0	3	0	—		16	0
Tampines Rovers FC	2026–27	0	0	0	0	0	0	0	0	0	0
Career total		133	0	3	0	10	0	7	0	153	0

- Young Lions are ineligible for qualification to AFC competitions in their respective leagues.

== Honours ==
Lion City Sailors

- AFC Champions League Two runner-up: 2024–25
- Singapore Premier League: 2024–25
- Singapore Cup: 2023, 2024–25
- Singapore Community Shield: 2024

Singapore U22

- Merlion Cup: 2019
