= Muhaimin Suhaimi =

Singaporean footballer

Personal information
- Full name: Muhammad Muhaimin bin Suhaimi
- Date of birth: 20 February 1995 (age 31)
- Place of birth: Singapore
- Height: 1.67 m (5 ft 5 1/2 in)
- Position: Midfielder

Youth career
- –2013: National Football Academy

Senior career*
Years	Team	Apps	(Gls)
2014–2017	Young Lions	40	(3)
2018–2023	Hougang United	55	(0)

International career
- Singapore U23
- * Club domestic league appearances and goals as of 11:11, 26 November 2014 (UTC)

Muhammad Muhaimin bin Suhaimi (born 20 February 1995) is a Singaporean former footballer who last played as a full-back or wide-midfielder for Singapore Premier League club Hougang United and the Singapore national team.

== Club career ==
Muhaimin was part of the National Football Academy (NFA) under-16 team that finished runners-up to CR Flamengo's youth team in the 2011 Lion City Cup following a 4–3 penalty shootout loss in the final. He was a recipient of the TNP Schools Sports Star award in the same year.

Muhaimin played for the NFA U18 team in the Prime League. In 2014, he was promoted to under-23 developmental side Young Lions playing in the S.League. He made his debut in the 78th minute of a 4–0 home loss to Balestier Khalsa on 23 February. His first goal came in a 3–2 home defeat to Warriors on 24 April. He ended the season with two goals in 11 league matches.

== International career ==
Muhaimin represented the Singapore U14 team at the 2009 Asian Youth Games, and was part of the U15 team which won the bronze medal at the 2010 Summer Youth Olympics. He scored a brace against Zimbabwe U15 in a 3–1 win. In the next match against Montenegro U15, Just 3 mins into the game, Muhaimin open up the account with a goal as Singapore U23 went on to win 3–2.

Muhaimin was first called up to the senior side in June 2017 for the closed door friendly against Myanmar on 6 June 2017, the 2019 AFC Asian Cup qualifiers against Chinese Taipei on 10 June 2017 and the friendly against Argentina on 13 June 2017.

== Personal life ==
Muhaimin is the son of former jockey Suhaimi Salleh and Sarina Durimi. His younger brother, Muhelmy, plays as a midfielder for the national youth teams.

== Career statistics ==
=== Club ===
As of match played 10 Oct 2021. Caps and goals may not be correct.

Club	Season	S.League		Singapore Cup		Singapore League Cup		Asia		Total	
Club	Season	Apps	Goals	Apps	Goals	Apps	Goals	Apps	Goals	Apps	Goals
Young Lions FC	2014	11	2	0	0	0	0	—		11	2
Young Lions FC	2015	0	0	0	0	0	0	—		0	0
Young Lions FC	Total	11	2	0	0	0	0	0	0	11	2
Home United	2015	1	0	0	0	0	0	—		1	0
Home United	Total	1	0	0	0	0	0	0	0	1	0
Young Lions FC	2016	11	0	1	0	0	0	—		12	0
Young Lions FC	2017	16	2	0	0	0	0	—		16	2
Young Lions FC	Total	27	2	1	0	0	0	0	0	28	2
Hougang United	2018	17	0	2	0	0	0	—		19	0
Hougang United	2019	9	0	1	0	0	0	—		10	0
Hougang United	2020	5	0	1	0	0	0	0	0	6	0
Hougang United	2021	6	0	0	0	0	0	0	0	6	0
Hougang United	2022	0	0	0	0	0	0	0	0	0	0
Hougang United	Total	37	0	4	0	0	0	0	0	41	0
Career total		76	4	5	0	0	0	0	0	81	4

- 2020 Singapore Cup match is the Charity Shield
- Young Lions withdrew from the 2011 and 2012 Singapore Cup, and the 2011 Singapore League Cup due to participation in AFC and AFF youth competitions.

== International statistics ==
U23 International goals

No	Date	Venue	Opponent	Score	Result	Competition
1	20 July 2014	Flachau, Austria	(Germany) TSV Freilassing	4-0	5-0	Friendly Game
2	23 May 2015	Jalan Besar Stadium, Singapore	Laos	4-1	5-1	U23 International Friendly

== Honours ==
Singapore U15

- Summer Youth Olympics: bronze medalist, 2010
