= Yeo Hai Ngee =

Singaporean footballer

Personal information
- Full name: Yeo Hai Ngee
- Date of birth: 12 January 1995 (age 31)
- Place of birth: Singapore
- Height: 1.82 m (6 ft 0 in)
- Position: Defender

Team information
- Current team: Geylang International
- Number: 11

Youth career
- 2013: NFA U17
- 2014: NFA U18
- 2015–2016: Home United

Senior career*
Years	Team	Apps	(Gls)
2017	Young Lions	7	(0)
2018	Geylang International		

International career
2016–	Singapore U21		
- * Club domestic league appearances and goals as of December 28, 2016

Yeo Hai Ngee is a Singaporean footballer who plays for Geylang International as a defender.

He started playing in the Sleague for Young Lions FC in 2017 after winning the prime league title twice with Home United Prime League.

== Club career ==
=== Home United ===
He signed for the protectors for their prime league squad in 2015 after being released from the NFA U18.

=== Young Lions FC ===
As he was identified as part of the 2017 SEA Games football squad, he was recruited to the Young Lions FC squad for the 2017 season. He joined fellow Home United Prime League squad players in joining the Young Lions in 2017.

== International career ==
He was called up by the FAS for the U21 friendly mates against Bahrain U21.& China U21

== Career statistics ==
Update 31 Dec 2020

Club	Season	S.League		Singapore Cup		Singapore League Cup		Asia		Total	
Club	Season	Apps	Goals	Apps	Goals	Apps	Goals	Apps	Goals	Apps	Goals
Home United	2016	0	0	0	0	3	0	0	0	3	0
Home United	Total	0	0	0	0	3	0	0	0	3	0
Young Lions FC	2017	2	0	0	0	0	0	0	0	2	0
Young Lions FC	Total	2	0	0	0	0	0	0	0	2	0
Geylang International	2018	16	3	2	0	0	0	0	0	18	3
Geylang International	Total	16	3	2	0	0	0	0	0	18	3
Warriors FC	2019	6	1	2	0	0	0	0	0	8	1
Warriors FC	Total	6	1	2	0	0	0	0	0	8	1
Balestier Khalsa	2020	8	0	0	0	0	0	0	0	8	0
Balestier Khalsa	Total	8	0	0	0	0	0	0	0	8	0
Career total		32	4	4	0	3	0	0	0	39	4
