= Jordan Chan (footballer) =

Singaporean footballer

Personal information
- Full name: Jordan Chan Zhi Wei
- Date of birth: 5 March 1998 (age 28)
- Place of birth: Singapore
- Position: Midfielder

Team information
- Current team: Hougang United
- Number: 8

Senior career*
| Years | Team | Apps | (Gls) |
| 2017 | Young Lions | 5 | (0) |
| 2018 | Hougang United | 1 | (0) |

International career^{‡}
| 2017 | Singapore U19 | | |
| 2017– | Singapore U22 | 1 | (1) |
- * Club domestic league appearances and goals as of 2 May 2017 ‡ National team caps and goals as of 2 May 2017

Jordan Chan Zhi Wei (born 5 March 1998) is a Singaporean footballer who plays for Hougang United as a midfielder.

== Club career ==
=== Young Lions ===
Chan started his professional career in 2017 where he signed for the under-23 side Young Lions.

=== Hougang United ===
In 2018, he switched clubs to Hougang United.

== International career ==
Chan was first called up to the Singapore U22 in 2017 for the match against Vanuatu U20. Chan started in the first game of the tour and he scored his first goal in the 45th minute.

== Career statistics ==
| Club | Season | S.League | | Singapore Cup | | Singapore League Cup | | Asia | | Total | |
| Club | Season | Apps | Goals | Apps | Goals | Apps | Goals | Apps | Goals | Apps | Goals |
|---|---|---|---|---|---|---|---|---|---|---|---|
| Young Lions | 2017 | 5 | 0 | 0 | 0 | 0 | 0 | — | | 5 | 0 |
| Hougang United | 2018 | 1 | 0 | 0 | 0 | 0 | 0 | — | | 1 | 0 |
| Career Total | | 6 | 0 | 0 | 0 | 0 | 0 | 0 | 0 | 6 | 0 |

- Young Lions and LionsXII are ineligible for qualification to AFC competitions in their respective leagues.

== International Statistics ==
=== U16 International caps ===
| No | Date | Venue | Opponent | Result | Competition |
|---|---|---|---|---|---|
| 1 | 23 August 2013 | Wunna Theikdi Stadium, Naypyidaw, Myanmar | Malaysia | 1-1 (draw) | 2013 AFF U-16 Youth Championship |
| 2 | 25 August 2013 | Wunna Theikdi Stadium, Naypyidaw, Myanmar | Philippines | 2-0 (won) | 2013 AFF U-16 Youth Championship |
| 3 | 27 August 2013 | Wunna Theikdi Stadium, Naypyidaw, Myanmar | Indonesia | 1-1 (draw) | 2013 AFF U-16 Youth Championship |

=== U19 International caps ===
| No | Date | Venue | Opponent | Result | Competition |
|---|---|---|---|---|---|
| 1 | 11 September 2016 | Hàng Đẫy Stadium, Hanoi, Vietnam | Vietnam | 0-0 (draw) | 2016 AFF U-19 Youth Championship |
| 2 | 15 September 2016 | Hàng Đẫy Stadium, Hanoi, Vietnam | Malaysia | 1-2 (lost) | 2016 AFF U-19 Youth Championship |
| 3 | 17 September 2016 | Hàng Đẫy Stadium, Hanoi, Vietnam | Philippines | 2-1 (won) | 2016 AFF U-19 Youth Championship |
| 4 | 19 September 2016 | Hàng Đẫy Stadium, Hanoi, Vietnam | Timor-Leste | 0-2 (lost) | 2016 AFF U-19 Youth Championship |
