= Taufiq Muqminin =

Singaporean footballer

Personal information
- Full name: Taufiq Muqminin bin Hossain
- Date of birth: 26 July 1996 (age 30)
- Place of birth: Singapore
- Position: Defender

Team information
- Current team: Home United
- Number: 21

Youth career
- 2009: Singapore Sports School

Senior career*
Years	Team	Apps	(Gls)
2015–2018	Young Lions FC	25	(1)
2019	Home United	6	(0)
- * Club domestic league appearances and goals as of 1 January 2020

Taufiq Muqminin bin Hossain is a Singaporean footballer currently playing as a defender for Home United.

He was nominated for the 2013 The New Paper Dollah Kassim Award and was followed by a call-up to train with the Young Lions the next year.

== Career statistics ==
As of 17 March 2019

Club	Season	S.League		Singapore Cup		Singapore League Cup		Asia		Total	
Club	Season	Apps	Goals	Apps	Goals	Apps	Goals	Apps	Goals	Apps	Goals
Young Lions FC	2015	2	0	0	0	0	0	0	0	2	0
Young Lions FC	2016	11	0	0	0	0	0	0	0	11	0
Young Lions FC	2017	1	0	0	0	0	0	0	0	1	0
Young Lions FC	2018	12	1	0	0	0	0	0	0	12	1
Young Lions FC	Total	26	1	0	0	0	0	0	0	26	1
Home United	2019	6	0	0	0	0	0	1	0	7	0
Home United	Total	6	0	0	0	0	0	1	0	7	0
Career total		32	1	0	0	0	0	1	0	33	1
