= Syahrul Sazali =

Singaporean association football player

Personal information
- Full name: Muhammad Syahrul bin Sazali
- Date of birth: 3 June 1998 (age 28)
- Place of birth: Singapore
- Height: 1.79 m (5 ft 10 in)
- Position: Centre-back

Team information
- Current team: Tanjong Pagar United

Youth career
- –2016: NFA

Senior career*
Years	Team	Apps	(Gls)
2016–2019	Young Lions	66	(1)
2020	Tampines Rovers	13	(1)
2021–2022	Young Lions	9	(1)
2023–	Tampines Rovers	4	(0)
2024–2025	→ Albirex Niigata (S) (loan)	6	(0)
2025–	Tanjong Pagar United	0	(0)

International career^{‡}
2016–2017	Singapore U19	4	(1)
2017–2019	Singapore U23	22	(1)
2022	Singapore SEA Games	3	(0)
Medal record
Men's football
Representing Singapore
Merlion Cup
Winner	2019 Singapore
- * Club domestic league appearances and goals as of 14 May 2021 ‡ National team caps and goals as of 12 December 2019

Muhammad Syahrul bin Sazali is a Singaporean professional footballer who plays primarily as a centre-back for Singapore Premier League club Tanjong Pagar United.

== International career ==
Syahrul was named as one of the three overaged player for the 17th Sea Games in Hanoi.

He scored his 1st international goal in an U23 match against Fiji on 6 September 2019.

== Career statistics ==
As of 10 Oct 2021

Club	Season	S.League		Singapore Cup		Singapore League Cup		Asia		Total	
Club	Season	Apps	Goals	Apps	Goals	Apps	Goals	Apps	Goals	Apps	Goals
Young Lions	2016	2	0	0	0	0	0	0	0	2	0
Young Lions	2017	20	0	0	0	0	0	0	0	20	0
Young Lions	2018	23	0	0	0	0	0	0	0	23	0
Young Lions	2019	21	1	0	0	0	0	0	0	21	1
Young Lions	Total	66	1	0	0	0	0	0	0	66	1
Tampines Rovers	2020	8	1	0	0	1	0	4	0	13	1
Tampines Rovers	Total	8	1	0	0	1	0	4	0	13	1
Young Lions	2021	14	0	0	0	0	0	0	0	14	0
Young Lions	2022	6	0	0	0	0	0	0	0	6	0
Young Lions	Total	20	0	0	0	0	0	0	0	20	0
Tampines Rovers	2023	0	0	0	0	0	0	0	0	0	0
Career total		91	1	0	0	1	0	4	0	96	2

== Honours ==
=== International ===
Singapore U22

- Merlion Cup: 2019

== Others ==
=== Singapore Selection Squad ===
He was selected as part of the Singapore Selection squad for The Sultan of Selangor's Cup to be held on 24 August 2019.
