= Rusyaidi Salime =

Singaporean footballer

Personal information
- Full name: Muhammad Rusyaidi bin Salime
- Date of birth: 25 April 1998 (age 28)
- Place of birth: Singapore
- Height: 1.67 m (5 ft 6 in)
- Position: Midfielder

Team information
- Current team: Yishun Sentek Mariners
- Number: 8

Youth career
- 2014–2015: National Football Academy

Senior career*
Years	Team	Apps	(Gls)
2016–2019	Young Lions	67	(2)
2021–2022	Tanjong Pagar United	41	(1)
2023	Lion City Sailors	8	(0)
2024–	Yishun Sentek Mariners	0	(0)

International career
- Singapore U23
- * Club domestic league appearances and goals as of 14 May 2021 (UTC)

Muhammad Rusyaidi bin Salime (born 25 April 1998) is a Singaporean footballer who plays as a central-midfielder or defensive-midfielder for National Football League club Yishun Sentek Mariners.

== Club career ==
=== Youth ===
Rusyaidi started his career with the National Football Academy set up before moving to the development squad in 2016.

=== Young Lions ===
In 2016, Rusyaidi was promoted to the Young Lions squad competing in the S.League. Since the start of 2017, he is the regular playing for the club.

Rusyaidi was named winner of The Dollah Kassim Award in 2016 after having nominated in 2014. He also had a training stint in Japan with J2 League side, Omiya Ardija.

=== Tanjong Pagar United ===
On 26 January 2021, Rusyaidi joins Tanjong Pagar United. On 14 August 2021, he scored his first goal for the club against Geylang International in a 4–2 away win.

=== Lion City Sailors ===
On 22 December 2022, Rusyaidi joins Lion City Sailors for the upcoming 2023 Singapore Premier League season. On 9 December 2023, he was part of the winning squad that won the 2023 Singapore Cup which is also Rusyaidi first piece of silverware.

== Honours ==
=== Club ===
==== Lion City Sailors ====
- Singapore Cup: 2023

=== Individual ===
- Dollah Kassim Award recipients : 2016

== Career statistics ==
As of match played 27 Feb 22. Caps and goals may not be correct.

Club	Season	S.League		Singapore Cup		Singapore League Cup		Asia		Total	
Club	Season	Apps	Goals	Apps	Goals	Apps	Goals	Apps	Goals	Apps	Goals
Young Lions FC	2016	22	1	1	0	0	0	—		23	1
Young Lions FC	2017	22	1	0	0	0	0	—		22	1
Young Lions FC	2018	22	0	0	0	0	0	—		22	0
Young Lions FC	2019	0	0	0	0	0	0	—		0	0
Young Lions FC	Total	66	2	1	0	0	0	0	0	67	2
Tanjong Pagar United	2021	18	0	0	0	0	0	—		18	0
Tanjong Pagar United	2022	21	1	2	0	0	0	0	0	23	1
Tanjong Pagar United	Total	39	1	2	0	0	0	0	0	41	1
Lion City Sailors	2023	8	0	0	0	0	0	0	0	8	0
Lion City Sailors	Total	8	0	0	0	0	0	0	0	8	0
Career Total		113	3	3	0	0	0	0	0	116	3
