= Shafeeq Faruk =

Singaporean footballer

Personal information
- Full name: Mohamad Shafeeq bin Faruk
- Date of birth: 21 September 1996 (age 30)
- Place of birth: Singapore
- Height: 1.73 m (5 ft 8 in)
- Position: Forward

Team information
- Current team: Young Lions
- Number: 26

Senior career*
Years	Team	Apps	(Gls)
2015	Geylang International	3	(0)
2016–	Young Lions	10	(2)

International career
- Singapore U21
- * Club domestic league appearances and goals as of 02:14, 23 November 2014 (UTC)

Mohamad Shafeeq bin Faruk is a Singaporean footballer who plays as a striker for S.League club Young Lions.

== Club career ==
He was the 2015 Prime League top scorer with 20 goals and was promoted to the senior squad for 2016.

However, prior to the start of the 2016 season, he was called up by the FAS to join the Young Lions FC.

== International career ==
He also represented the Singapore National U21 team which finished third in the 2015 Vietnam Youth Newspaper Cup.
