= Muhelmy Suhaimi =

Singaporean footballer

Personal information
- Full name: Muhammad Muhelmy bin Suhaimi
- Date of birth: 22 January 1996 (age 30)
- Place of birth: Singapore
- Height: 1.68 m (5 ft 6 in)
- Position: Midfielder

Team information
- Current team: Lion City Sailors
- Number: 28

Youth career
- 2014–2015: Tampines Rovers Prime League

Senior career*
Years	Team	Apps	(Gls)
2016-17	Young Lions	25	(0)
2018-2020	Lion City Sailors	9	(0)

International career
- Singapore U23
- * Club domestic league appearances and goals as of 14:35, 08 October 2019 (AEST)

Muhammad Muhelmy bin Suhaimi (born 22 January 1996) is a former Singaporean professional footballer who plays as a midfielder.

== Career ==
He played for the Tampines Rovers Prime League squad before joining the Young Lions.

On 13 March 2015, He was selected for 10-days training stint in France and was involved in two friendly matches for FC Metz, against RC Strasbourg on their second day there, and FC Sarrebourg, a day before they were scheduled to return home.

He was with the Young Lions since 2016.

In 2016, he was also called up to the inaugural national cup held in Malaysia.

== Personal life ==
Muhaimin is the son of former jockey Suhaimi Salleh and Sarina Durimi. His brother, Muhaimin Suhaimi, plays as a midfielder for the national youth teams.

He receives the Singapore Pools' Passport to Excellence prize, which funds the cost of sending him for an overseas training stint. Singapore Pools launched the incentive in 2010 to nurture young sports talent, in line with its commitment as a leading partner in the sports community.

He was unveiled as the winner of this year's The New Paper Dollah Kassim Award in 2014.

== Honours ==
=== Individual ===
- Dollah Kassim Award recipients : 2014

== Career statistics ==
As of 26 November 2014

Club performance
Club	Season	S.League		Singapore Cup		Singapore League Cup		Total	
Club	Season	Apps	Goals	Apps	Goals	Apps	Goals	Apps	Goals
Young Lions	2016	0	0	0	0	0	0	0	
Total		0	0	0	0	0	0	0	0
