= Singapore national under-23 football team =

Singapore U-23
- Nickname: Young Lions
- Association: Football Association of Singapore (FAS)
- Confederation: AFC (Asia)
- Sub-confederation: AFF (Southeast Asia)
- Head coach: Firdaus Kassim
- Captain: Harhys Stewart
- Home stadium: Jalan Besar Stadium
- FIFA code: SGP
| First colours | Second colours |

Biggest win
- Cambodia 0–5 Singapore (Petaling Jaya, Malaysia; 5 September 2001); Singapore 5–0 Vietnam (Nakhon Ratchasima, Thailand; 14 December 2007)

Biggest defeat
- Singapore 1–8 Japan (Kallang, Singapore; 14 February 2015); Singapore 0–7 Vietnam (Phnom Penh, Cambodia; 19 February 2022); Singapore 0–7 Malaysia (Phnom Penh, Cambodia; 11 May 2023)

Southeast Asian Games
- Appearances: 12 (first in 2001)
- Best result: Bronze Medal (2007, 2009, 2013)
Medal record
Singapore national under-23 football team
Medal record
U-23 Southeast Asian Championship
| Bronze medal – third place | 2007 Thailand | Team |
| Bronze medal – third place | 2009 Laos | Team |
| Bronze medal – third place | 2013 Myanmar | Team |
Merdeka Tournament
| Bronze medal – third place | 2013 Malaysia | Team |

Singapore U-23 starting XI against France U-21 in 2014

The Singapore national under-23 football team is the national under-23 association football team of Singapore. The team comes under the organisation of the Football Association of Singapore (FAS).

Players are usually selected from the Singapore Premier League team, Young Lions as the squad is composed mostly of players undergoing their National Service and also because of their time playing together in the same squad.

== History ==
On 25 March 2014, Football Association of Singapore (FAS) announced that Singapore U-23 team will face France U-21 on 2 June in Reunion Island where the team is helms by Singapore senior national team head coach, Bernd Stange. The match was put together in a bid to convince the Singapore National Olympic Council that the under-23 deserve to represent the nation at the 2014 Asian Games held in Incheon, South Korea in September. Singapore U-23 end up suffered a 6–0 defeat at the Stade Paul Julius Bénard with goals coming from Samuel Umtiti, Paul-Georges Ntep, Kingsley Coman, Florian Thauvin and Neal Maupay.

Singapore then played in the 2014 Asian Games where they were placed in Group C alongside Tajikistan U-23, Oman U-23 and Palestine U-23. Singapore conceded a late goal against Tajikistan U-23 in the first match losing 1–0 to them. Singapore U-23 then faced Oman U-23 where the team was down at 3–1 before Faris Ramli and Safuwan Baharudin scored the goal to equalise the match at 3–3. In the last match fixtures against Palestine U-23, the team won 2–1 with Shahfiq Ghani scoring a brace in the match. Singapore got 4 points in the group stage which would have seen the team qualified to the Round of 16 but Tajikistan U-23 scored a last minute goal against Oman U-23 which see them qualified to the knockout stages instead.

=== Controversies ===
Singapore under-22 has a disastrous performance at the 2023 SEA Games in Cambodia. Not only the team failed to win a single match, the team were mauled 7–0 by arch-rivals Malaysia U-22 in their final match, and ended the campaign finishing in tenth place at the rock-bottom of the table ranking as the worst team at the tournament.

On 18 May 2023, Football Association of Singapore (FAS) announced that coach Philippe Aw has been granted a ‘leave of absence’ as the head coach of the Young Lions team in which a technical review of the SEA Games performance will subsequently take place after his return.

The poor performances of the Singapore U-23 team in at the SEA GAMES have triggered fans who vented their anger and frustrations on social media, with some calling for officials from the FAS to be axed and the time to look at the appointments at every level of Singapore football to ensure that the people of the right expertise are appointed for the right jobs.

Acting FAS president, Bernard Tan also added that until the review has been completed, the Singapore U-22 has decided not to send the team to the upcoming 2023 AFF U-23 Championship held in August and the Asian Games in Hangzhou that will be held in September. As FAS recalibrates its priority on two tournaments, the 2024 AFC U-23 Asian Cup qualification fixtures being held in Vietnam and the 2025 SEA Games. In the review, one of the recommendations was for the Young Lions to focus on the two above mentioned competitions and for all other tournaments to be regarded as developmental opportunities.

On 7 July 2023, FAS unveiled 10 recommendations to improve the country's performance at future SEA Games including giving key U-23 and U-22 players more game time and to approach the multisport event as a two-year project to allow the coach and team to develop over a longer period. The recommendations were formulated based on internal reports submitted by

FAS departments after the tournament, “objective" analytics, “subjective" feedback gathered by a SEA Games review committee which interviewed personnel involved in the Games, and discussions with individuals including from other countries' football associations. FAS noted that only eight players in the SEA Games squad were playing regularly in the 2023 Singapore Premier League season where the lack of game time possibly affected the ability of players, especially those not exposed to sufficient minutes, to cope with the tempo of the tournament, where a game is played every two to three days over the course of two days

On 12 July 2023, FAS has confirmed the departure of Philippe Aw as U-23 head coach. He was replaced by former national team player, Nazri Nasir who lead the squad during the 2024 AFC U-23 Asian Cup qualifiers. Additionally, Nazri, who is currently the Senior Singapore national team assistant coach, will also be assigned to the Young Lions team in the Singapore Premier League. This enables him to track the progress and oversee the development of the young footballers. Players will also have individual development plans to allow the coach to improve their abilities over the two years of preparation. The review panel observed that players arrived for pre games training with different levels of fitness and conditioning. A standard operating procedure will be drawn up to aim to deliver at least two warm-up matches prior to the tournaments. The FAS will also adjust the league scheduling to ensure the age-group players meet this requirement with a minimum of two weeks preparation for the priority tournaments while diets of the players will also be planned when the FAS has control of the meals which currently, only hydration is monitored, while players are advised on healthy eating.

Nazri have his provisional squad report for centralised training from 21 August 2023 in which FAS has made adjustments to the 2023 Singapore Premier League fixture calendar to allow the team to have uninterrupted 14-day preparation as they travelled to Thailand to play a couple of friendly before flying off to Vietnam for their 2024 AFC U-23 Asian Cup qualifiers. Eventually Singapore failed to qualify to the final tournament.

== Players ==
=== Current squad ===
The following players were called up for the 2026 Gia Lai U-23 VTV Cup

Caps and goals updated as of 9 September 2025, after the match against Bangladesh.

| No. | Pos. | Player | Date of birth (age) | Caps | Goals | Club |
|---|---|---|---|---|---|---|
| 1 | GK | Issac Goh Jun Yang | 5 June 2007 (age 19) | 0 | 0 | (Football Association of Singapore) Lion City Sailors |
| 13 | GK | Aizil Yazid | 24 December 2004 (age 21) | 11 | 0 | (Football Association of Singapore) Hougang United |
| 25 | GK | Firman Nabil | 27 March 2005 (age 21) | 0 | 0 | (Football Association of Singapore) FC Jurong |
| 2 | DF | Fairuz Fazli | 20 January 2005 (age 21) | 0 | 0 | (Football Association of Singapore) Young Lions |
| 3 | DF | Andrew Aw | 29 March 2003 (age 23) | 8 | 0 | (Football Association of Singapore) FC Jurong |
| 4 | DF | Marcus Mosses | 21 January 2005 (age 21) | 1 | 0 | (Football Association of Singapore) Tanjong Pagar United |
| 5 | DF | Ikram Mikhail Mustaqim | 5 August 2005 (age 21) | 0 | 0 | (Football Association of Singapore) Young Lions |
| 8 | DF | Andy Reefqy | 14 July 2008 (age 18) | 0 | 0 | (Football Association of Singapore) Young Lions |
| 14 | DF | Adrian Jaccard | 30 October 2006 (age 20) | 0 | 0 | (Football Association of Singapore) Lion City Sailors |
| 19 | DF | Kieran Teo | 6 April 2004 (age 22) | 10 | 0 | (Football Association of Singapore) Tanjong Pagar United |
| 20 | DF | Sim Jun Yen | 28 September 2007 (age 19) | 0 | 0 | (Football Association of Singapore) FC Jurong |
| 21 | DF | Iryan Fandi | 9 August 2006 (age 20) | 0 | 0 | (Football Association of Singapore) Young Lions |
| 6 | MF | Ajay Robson | 6 December 2003 (age 22) | 9 | 0 | (Football Association of Singapore) Young Lions |
| 10 | MF | Nur Muhammad Asis | 4 March 2004 (age 22) | 0 | 0 | (Football Association of Singapore) Lion City Sailors |
| 18 | MF | Yasir Nizamudin | 21 January 2005 (age 21) | 0 | 0 | (Football Association of Singapore) Lion City Sailors |
| 23 | MF | Harith Danish | 27 November 2008 (age 17) | 2 | 0 | (Football Association of Singapore) Young Lions |
| 7 | FW | Khairin Nadim | 8 May 2004 (age 22) | 9 | 1 | (Football Association of Singapore) Hougang United |
| 9 | FW | Timothy Cheng | 25 August 2005 (age 21) | 0 | 0 | (Football Association of Singapore) Balestier Khalsa |
| 11 | FW | Sahoo Garv | 26 March 2006 (age 20) | 0 | 0 | (Football Association of Singapore) Young Lions |
| 12 | FW | Sarrvin Raj | 5 April 2008 (age 18) | 0 | 0 | (Football Association of Singapore) Young Lions |
| 15 | FW | Kian Ghadessy | 30 November 2005 (age 20) | 2 | 0 | (Football Association of Singapore) |
| 17 | FW | Amir Syafiz | 21 June 2004 (age 22) | 4 | 0 | (Football Association of Singapore) Hougang United |
| 24 | FW | Ahmad Danial | 6 November 2005 (age 21) | 0 | 0 | (Football Association of Singapore) Lion City Sailors |

=== Recent call-ups ===
The following players have also been called up to the Singapore squad within the last twelve months.

| Pos. | Player | Date of birth (age) | Caps | Goals | Club | Latest call-up |
|---|---|---|---|---|---|---|
| GK | Dany Irfan | | 0 | 0 | (Singapore) Balestier Khalsa | Sept-26 Training Camp |
| GK | Rauf Erwan | 25 April 2005 (age 21) | 0 | 0 | (Singapore) Hougang United | Mar-26 Training Camp |
| GK | Ainun Nuha | 11 March 2006 (age 20) | 0 | 0 | (Singapore) Young Lions | Mar-26 Training Camp |
| GK | Sunny Tia Yang Guang | 25 February 2004 (age 22) | 0 | 0 | (Singapore) Tanjong Pagar United | v. Thailand, 12 Dec 2025 |
| DF | Raiyan Noor | 20 January 2006 (age 20) | 0 | 0 | (Singapore) Geylang International | Sept-26 Training Camp |
| DF | Aqil Zafri | 6 October 2007 (age 19) | 0 | 0 | (Singapore) FC Jurong | Sept-26 Training Camp |
| DF | Rauf Sanizal | 7 November 2006 (age 20) | 0 | 0 | (Singapore) Hougang United | Sept-26 Training Camp |
| DF | Luth Harith | 19 March 2008 (age 18) | 3 | 0 | (Singapore) Young Lions | Sept-26 Training Camp |
| DF | Ikmal Hazlan | 11 January 2007 (age 19) | 0 | 0 | (Singapore) Balestier Khalsa | Sept-26 Training Camp |
| DF | Kegan Phang | 23 January 2006 (age 20) | 0 | 0 | (Singapore) Tampines Rovers | Mar-26 Training Camp |
| DF | Nizwan Izzairie | 26 January 2005 (age 21) | 0 | 0 | (Singapore) Geylang International | v. Thailand, 12 Dec 2025 |
| DF | Raoul Suhaimi | 18 September 2005 (age 21) | 9 | 0 | (Singapore) Young Lions | v. Thailand, 12 Dec 2025 |
| DF | Aqil Yazid | 9 January 2004 (age 22) | 9 | 0 | (Singapore) Young Lions | v. Thailand, 12 Dec 2025 |
| DF | Aniq Raushan | 5 October 2003 (age 23) | 0 | 0 | (Singapore) Young Lions | v. Thailand, 12 Dec 2025 |
| DF | Adam Reefdy | 8 May 2004 (age 22) | 5 | 0 | (Singapore) Young Lions | v. Bangladesh, 9 Sept 2025 |
| DF | Junki Yoshimura | 20 July 2004 (age 22) | 0 | 0 | (Singapore) Young Lions | v. Bangladesh, 9 Sept 2025 |
| MF | Caelan Cheong | 22 January 2006 (age 20) | 0 | 0 | (Singapore) Young Lions | v. Thailand, 12 Dec 2025 |
| MF | Prince Rio Rifae'i | 27 January 2008 (age 18) | 0 | 0 | (Singapore) Geylang International | v. Thailand, 12 Dec 2025 |
| MF | Rae Peh Jun Wen | 15 September 2008 (age 18) | 3 | 0 | (Singapore) Young Lions | v. Thailand, 12 Dec 2025 |
| MF | Caden Lim Zheng Yi | 20 October 2006 (age 20) | 0 | 0 | (Singapore) BG Tampines Rovers | Mar-26 Training Camp |
| MF | Nathan Mao | 26 March 2008 (age 18) | 0 | 0 | (Singapore) Young Lions | v. Thailand, 12 Dec 2025 |
| MF | Ong Yu En | 3 October 2003 (age 23) | 2 | 0 | (Singapore) Young Lions | v. Thailand, 12 Dec 2025 |
| FW | Samuel Pillai | 22 February 2005 (age 21) | 0 | 0 | (Singapore) Tanjong Pagar United | Sep-26 Training Camp |
| FW | Ashvin Vela | 3 March 2005 (age 21) | 0 | 0 | (Singapore) Hougang United | Sep-26 Training Camp |
| FW | Jaden Heng | 10 November 2008 (age 18) | 0 | 0 | (Singapore) FC Jurong | Sep-26 Training Camp |
| FW | Naufal Mohammad | 20 September 2006 (age 20) | 0 | 0 | (Singapore) Tampines Rovers | Sep-26 Training Camp |
| FW | Jonan Tan | 27 June 2006 (age 20) | 4 | 0 | (Portugal) Vizela | v. Thailand, 12 Dec 2025 |
| FW | Nicolas Beninger | 4 July 2006 (age 20) | 0 | 0 | (Singapore) Young Lions | v. Thailand, 12 Dec 2025 |

- ^{INJ} Withdrew due to an injury
- ^{PRE} Preliminary squad
- ^{OA} Overage player

== Coaching staff ==
| Position | Name |
|---|---|
| Team manager | (Singapore) Anders Aplin (Singapore) Matthew Tay |
| Head coach | (Singapore) Firdaus Kassim |
| Assistant coach | (Singapore) Hasrin Jailani |
| Assistant coach | (Singapore) Fadzuhasny Juraimi |
| Goalkeeper coach | (Singapore) Rameshpal Singh |
| Fitness Coach | (Bosnia and Herzegovina) Dževad Šarić |
| Match analyst | (Japan) Satoru Okada |
| Head football science and medicine | (Malaysia) Firdaus Maasar |
| Senior sports trainer | (Singapore) Nasruldin Baharuddin |
| Sports trainer | (Singapore) Fazly Hasan (Singapore) Ryan Wang |
| Masseur | (Singapore) Gurnaya Singh |
| Sports scientist | (Singapore) Faizal Khalid Abdul Aziz |
| Lead physiotherapist | (Singapore) Nurhafizah Abu Sujad |
| Kit manager | (Singapore) Omar Mohd |
| Media officer | (Singapore) Chia Pui San |

== Tournament records ==
=== Olympic Games ===
Olympic Games Record
| Year | Round | Position | GP | W | D | L | GS | GA |
|---|---|---|---|---|---|---|---|---|
| (Spain) 1992 | did not qualify | | | | | | | |
| (United States) 1996 | did not qualify | | | | | | | |
| (Australia) 2000 | did not qualify | | | | | | | |
| (Greece) 2004 | did not qualify | | | | | | | |
| (China) 2008 | did not qualify | | | | | | | |
| (England) 2012 | did not qualify | | | | | | | |
| (Brazil) 2016 | did not qualify | | | | | | | |
| (Japan) 2020 | did not qualify | | | | | | | |
| Total | 0/8 | 0 | 0 | 0 | 0 | 0 | 0 | 0 |

- Since 1992, football at the Summer Olympics changes into Under-23 tournament.

=== AFC U-23 Championship ===
AFC U-23 Championship Record
| Year | Round | GP | W | D | L | GF | GA |
|---|---|---|---|---|---|---|---|
| (Oman) 2013 | did not qualify | | | | | | |
| (Qatar) 2016 | did not qualify | | | | | | |
| (China) 2018 | did not qualify | | | | | | |
| (Thailand) 2020 | did not qualify | | | | | | |
| (Uzbekistan) 2022 | did not qualify | | | | | | |
| (Qatar) 2024 | did not qualify | | | | | | |
| (Saudi Arabia) 2026 | did not qualify | | | | | | |
| (Japan) 2028 | To be determined | | | | | | |
| Total | 0/8 | 0 | 0 | 0 | 0 | 0 | 0 |

=== Asian Games ===
Asian Games Record
| Year | Round | Position | GP | W | D* | L | GS | GA |
|---|---|---|---|---|---|---|---|---|
| (South Korea) 2002 | did not enter | | | | | | | |
| (Qatar) 2006 | Round 1 | 23rd | 3 | 0 | 2 | 1 | 1 | 3 |
| (China) 2010 | Round 1 | 19th | 3 | 0 | 1 | 2 | 1 | 6 |
| (South Korea) 2014 | Round 1 | 17th | 3 | 1 | 1 | 1 | 5 | 5 |
| (Indonesia) 2018 | did not enter | | | | | | | |
| (China) 2022 | did not enter | | | | | | | |
| (Japan) 2026 | did not qualify | | | | | | | |
| Total | 3/4 | 0 | 9 | 1 | 4 | 4 | 7 | 14 |

- Since 2002, football at the Asian Games changes into Under-23 tournament.

=== SEA Games ===
SEA Games Record
| Year | Round | Position | GP | W | D* | L | GS | GA |
|---|---|---|---|---|---|---|---|---|
| (Malaysia) 2001 | Group stage | 4/9 | 4 | 2 | 0 | 2 | 10 | 3 |
| (Vietnam) 2003 | Group stage | 5/8 | 3 | 1 | 0 | 2 | 5 | 5 |
| (Philippines) 2005 | Group stage | 5/9 | 4 | 2 | 1 | 1 | 3 | 2 |
| (Thailand) 2007 | Bronze | 3/8 | 5 | 2 | 2 | 1 | 10 | 7 |
| (Laos) 2009 | Bronze | 3/9 | 5 | 2 | 2 | 1 | 8 | 8 |
| (Indonesia) 2011 | Group stage | 5/11 | 4 | 2 | 1 | 1 | 4 | 3 |
| (Myanmar) 2013 | Bronze | 3/10 | 6 | 3 | 2 | 1 | 7 | 4 |
| (Singapore) 2015 | Group stage | 6/11 | 4 | 2 | 0 | 2 | 5 | 4 |
| (Malaysia) 2017 | Group stage | 6/11 | 4 | 2 | 0 | 2 | 4 | 4 |
| (Philippines) 2019 | Group stage | 7/11 | 5 | 1 | 1 | 3 | 7 | 6 |
| (Vietnam) 2021 | Group stage | 6/10 | 4 | 1 | 2 | 1 | 5 | 9 |
| (Cambodia) 2023 | Group stage | 10/10 | 4 | 0 | 1 | 3 | 2 | 13 |
| (Thailand) 2025 | Group stage | 9/9 | 2 | 0 | 0 | 2 | 1 | 6 |
| 2027 | To be determined | | | | | | | |
| 2029 | To be determined | | | | | | | |
| 2031 | To be determined | | | | | | | |
| 2033 | To be determined | | | | | | | |
| Total | Bronze medalists | 13/13 | 54 | 20 | 12 | 22 | 71 | 74 |

- Since 2001, Football at the Southeast Asian Games changes into Under-23 tournament.

*Denotes draws include knockout matches decided on penalty kicks.
**Red border color indicates tournament was held on home soil.

SEA Games History
| Year | Round | Score | Result |
|---|---|---|---|
| 2007 | Round 1 | Singapore 0–0 Laos | Draw |
| 2007 | Round 1 | Singapore 3–2 Vietnam | Win |
| 2007 | Round 1 | Singapore 1–1 Malaysia | Draw |
| 2007 | Semi Finals | Singapore 0–3 Thailand | Loss |
| 2007 | Third Place | Singapore 5–0 Vietnam | Win |
| 2009 | Round 1 | Singapore 2–2 Indonesia | Draw |
| 2009 | Round 1 | Singapore 2–1 Myanmar | Win |
| 2009 | Round 1 | Singapore 0–0 Laos | Draw |
| 2009 | Semi Finals | Singapore 1–4 Vietnam | Loss |
| 2009 | Third Place | Singapore 3–1 Laos | Win |
| 2013 | Round 1 | Singapore 1–1 Laos | Draw |
| 2013 | Round 1 | Singapore 1–0 Vietnam | Win |
| 2013 | Round 1 | Singapore 2–0 Brunei | Win |
| 2013 | Round 1 | Singapore 1–1 Malaysia | Draw |
| 2013 | Semi Finals | Singapore 0–1 Thailand | Loss |
| 2013 | Third Place | Singapore 2–1 Malaysia | Win |

*Win on penalty kicks.

== Recent results ==
Win Draw Lose

=== 2014 ===
2014 Hassanal Bolkiah Trophy

| 9 August 2014 Group B | Vietnam | 4–0 | Singapore | Bandar Seri Begawan, Brunei |
| | Hồ Tuấn Tài 18', 49'; Nguyễn Công Phượng 58'; Nguyễn Văn Toàn 81' | Report | | Stadium: Hassanal Bolkiah National Stadium, Brunei; Referee: Steve Supresencia (Philippines) |

| 11 August 2014 Group B | Cambodia | 3–1 | Singapore | Bandar Seri Begawan, Brunei |
| | Chan Vathanaka 23'; Nub Tola 38'; Prak Mony Udom 43' | | Zakir Samsudin 55' | Stadium: Hassanal Bolkiah National Stadium, Brunei; Referee: Xaypaseuth Phongsanit (Laos) |

| 13 August 2014 Group B | Brunei | 3–1 | Singapore | Bandar Seri Begawan, Brunei |
| | Rashid 2', 68'; Adi Said 39' | | Yuz Henzry 83' | Stadium: Hassanal Bolkiah National Stadium, Brunei; Referee: Suhaizi Shukri (Malaysia) |

| 16 August 2014 Group B | Malaysia | 3–0 | Singapore | Bandar Seri Begawan, Brunei |
| | Shahrul Igwan 8'; Ramzi Sufian 59', 80' | | | Stadium: Hassanal Bolkiah National Stadium, Brunei; Referee: Steve Supresencia (Philippines) |

| 18 August 2014 Group B | Indonesia | 6–0 | Singapore | Bandar Seri Begawan, Brunei |
| | Drajad 6', 12', 49', 69'; Ilham Armaiyn 9'; Paulo Sitanggang 85' | | | Stadium: Hassanal Bolkiah National Stadium, Brunei; Referee: Suhaizi Shukri (Malaysia) |

=== 2015 ===
2015 Bangabandhu Cup

| 30 January 2015 2015 Bangabandhu Cup | Thailand | 3–2 | Singapore | Sylhet, Bangladesh |
| | | | | Stadium: Sylhet District Stadium |

| 1 February 2015 Bangabandhu Cup | Bahrain | 0–0 | Singapore | Dhaka, Bangladesh |
| | | | | Stadium: Bangabandhu National Stadium |

| 5 February 2015 2015 Bangabandhu Cup | Malaysia | 1–0 | Singapore | Dhaka, Bangladesh |
| | | | | Stadium: Bangabandhu National Stadium |

Friendly

| 14 February 2015 | Japan | 8–1 | Singapore | Singapore |
| | | | Irfan 78' | Stadium: Jalan Besar Stadium |

| 18 February 2015 | Syria | 6–1 | Singapore | Singapore |
| | Hael Albadri 4'; Mahmoud Al Baher 24'; Abdul Mannan Ibrahim 34' 62'; Adnan Altaki 39' 75' | Report | Tajeli Selamat 88' | Stadium: Jalan Besar Stadium |

| 21 February 2015 | Syria | 2–1 | Singapore | Singapore |
| | | | Irfan 17' | Stadium: Jalan Besar Stadium |

| 28 February 2015 | Cambodia | 3–0 | Singapore | Phnom Penh, Cambodia |
| | | Report | | Stadium: Navy Headquarters Football Field |

| 19 March 2015 | Singapore | 1-3 | Cambodia | Singapore |
| | Sahil 21'; Shakir (red card) 67'; Sheikh (red card) 90' | Report | Phanny 43'; Mony-Udom 67' (pen.); Sam-Oeun 71' | Stadium: Jalan Besar Stadium |

| 23 March 2015 | Singapore | 2–2 | Cambodia | Singapore |
| | Iqbal 44'; Anumanthan 88' | Report | Chan 55', 75' (pen.) | Stadium: Jurong West Stadium |

Football at the 2015 Southeast Asian Games

| 1 June 2015 Group stage | Philippines | 0–1 | Singapore | Singapore |
| 20:30 UTC+8 | | | Sheikh 45' | Stadium: Jalan Besar Stadium; Referee: Hiroyuki Kimura (Japan) |

| 4 June 2015 Group stage | Singapore | 1–2 | Myanmar | Singapore |
| 20:30 UTC+8 | Faris 34' (pen.) | | Nay Lin Tun 24'; Ye Ko Oo 60' | Stadium: Jalan Besar Stadium; Referee: Yousef Al-Marzouq (Kuwait) |

| 8 June 2015 Group stage | Cambodia | 1–3 | Singapore | Singapore |
| 20:30 UTC+8 | Vathanaka 57' | Report | Safirul 45+1'; Faris 45+2'; Sahil 90' | Stadium: Jalan Besar Stadium; Referee: Ma Ning (China) |

| 11 June 2015 Group stage | Singapore | 0–1 | Indonesia | Singapore |
| 20:30 UTC+8 | | Report | Evan 47' | Stadium: Jalan Besar Stadium; Referee: Kim Hee-gon (South Korea) |

=== 2016 ===
2016 AFC U-23 Championship qualification

| 27 March 2016 AFC U-23 Championship qualification | Laos | 0–0 | Singapore | Vientiane, Laos |
| | | Report | | Stadium: New Laos National Stadium |

| 29 March 2016 AFC U-23 Championship qualification | Singapore | 0–5 | China | Vientiane, Laos |
| | | Report | Li Yuanyi 2'; Feng Gang 39'; Xu Xin 58' (pen.); Zang Yifeng 66'; Wu Xinghan 79' | Stadium: New Laos National Stadium |

| 31 March 2016 AFC U-23 Championship qualification | Singapore | 2–2 | Mongolia | Vientiane, Laos |
| | Irfan 18', 59' | Report | Tsogtbaatar 8'; Erdenebat 45+1' | Stadium: New Laos National Stadium |

Friendly

| 4 September 2016 | Bahrain | 1–0 | Singapore | Singapore |
| | Abdulaziz Rajab 60' | Report | | Stadium: Choa Chu Kang Stadium |

| 4 October 2016 | China | 4–1 | Singapore | Inner Mongolia, China |
| | Gui Hong 6'; Cheng Jin 36', 39'; Liang Xueming 71' | | Shafeeq Faruk 80'; Adam Swandi (penalty missed) | Stadium: Hohhot Stadium |

| 8 October 2016 | China | 1–0 | Singapore | Yunnan, China |
| | Gao Zhunyi 6' (pen.) | | | Stadium: Qujing City Sports Centre Stadium |

=== 2017 ===
Friendly

| 19 February 2017 | Myanmar | 1–3 | Singapore | Yangon, Myanmar |
| 09:00 (UTC+7) | Hein Htet Aung 80' | | Amiruldin Asraf 38'; Amiruldin Asraf 48'; Haiqal Pashia 82' | Stadium: Thuwunna Stadium, Yangon |

| 28 March 2017 | Home United (Singapore) | 2–0 | Singapore U22 B-Team | Singapore |
| | | | | Stadium: Bishan Stadium |

| 1 May 2017 | Vanuatu | 2–3 | Singapore | Singapore |
| | Bong Kalo 10'; Kenneth Soromon 75' | Report | Hami Syahin 28'; Jordan Chan 45'; Muhaimin Suhaimi 62' | Stadium: Choa Chu Kang Stadium |

| 4 May 2017 | Vanuatu | 1–1 | Singapore | Singapore |
| | Godine Tenene 9' | Report | Hanafi Akbar 82' | Stadium: Choa Chu Kang Stadium |

| 7 May 2017 | Vanuatu | 1–1 | Singapore | Singapore |
| | Kalo 90+1' (pen.) | | Suhaimi 90' (pen.) | Stadium: Bishan Stadium |

| 3 June 2017 | Albirex Niigata (S) (Singapore) | cancelled | Singapore | Singapore |
| | | | | Stadium: Jurong East Stadium |

| 15 June 2017 | Qatar | 3–0 | Singapore | Doha, Qatar |
| | | | | Stadium: Jassim Bin Hamad Stadium |

| 17 June 2017 | Qatar | 2–0 | Singapore | Doha, Qatar |
| | | | | Stadium: Jassim Bin Hamad Stadium |

| 9 July 2017 | India | 1–0 | Singapore | Singapore |
| | Singh 80' | | | Stadium: Choa Chu Kang Stadium |

| 12 July 2017 | India | 0–1 | Singapore | Singapore |
| | | | Ikhsan 51' (pen.) | Stadium: Choa Chu Kang Stadium |

| 4 August 2017 | Australia | 4–0 | Singapore | Perth, Australia |
| | Marc Tokich 40'; Moudi Najjar 56', 58'; Christian Theoharous 78' (pen.) | | | Stadium: Hartfield Park |

| 8 August 2017 | Western Australia | 5–3 | Singapore | Perth, Australia |
| | Gordon Smith 6'; Niccolo Sabatini 24'; Alex Salmon 49', 70', 90' | | Hami Syahin 45+1'; Taufik Suparno 60'; Shahrin Saberin 85' | Stadium: Dorrien Gardens |

Dubai International Cup

| 20 March 2017 Dubai Cup | Jordan | 2–0 | Singapore | Dubai, United Arab Emirates |
| 16:00 (UTC+4) | | | | Stadium: Police Officers' Club Stadium |

| 24 March 2017 Dubai Cup | United Arab Emirates | 4–0 | Singapore | Dubai, United Arab Emirates |
| 19:30 (UTC+4) |

| 26 March 2017 Dubai Cup | Malaysia | 3–1 | Singapore | Dubai, United Arab Emirates |
| 16:00 (UTC+4) | Adam Nor Azlin 13'; Kumaahran Sathasivam 15'; N. Thanabalan 89' | | Adam Swandi 41' |

| 28 March 2017 Dubai Cup | Thailand | 2–0 | Singapore | Dubai, United Arab Emirates |
| 19:30 (UTC+4) | Shinnaphat 23'; Chaowat 76' |

2018 AFC U-23 Championship qualification

| 19 July 2017 | Myanmar | 2–0 | Singapore | Yangon, Myanmar |
| | Aung Thu 60'; Hlaing Bo Bo 90+3' | Report | | Stadium: Thuwunna Stadium, Yangon; Referee: Khamis Al-Kuwari (Qatar) |

| 21 July 2017 | Australia | 7–0 | Singapore | Yangon, Myanmar |
| | Mauk 8'; Blackwood 13', 18'; Popovic 39', 60'; Clut 68' (pen.); Sotirio 73' | Report | | Stadium: Thuwunna Stadium, Yangon; Referee: Ammar Mahfoodh (Bahrain) |

| 23 July 2017 | Brunei | 1–4 | Singapore | Yangon, Myanmar |
| | Azim Izamuddin 45' | Report | Ikhsan Fandi 13' 90'; Hanafi Akbar 39'; Taufil Suparno 86' | Stadium: Thuwunna Stadium, Yangon; Referee: Yudai Yamamoto (Japan) |

2017 Southeast Asian Games

| 14 August 2017 | Myanmar | 2–0 | Singapore | Selayang, Malaysia |
| | Aung Thu 45+1', 61' | | | Stadium: MP Selayang Stadium; Referee: Chen Hsin-chuan, Chinese Taipei |

| 16 August 2017 | Malaysia | 2–1 | Singapore | Shah Alam, Malaysia |
| | Azih 68'; Nadarajah 74' | | Amiruldin Asraf 38' | Stadium: Shah Alam Stadium; Referee: Võ Minh Trí, Vietnam |

| 18 August 2017 | Laos | 0–2 | Singapore | Selayang, Malaysia |
| | | | Taufik Suparno 2'; Ikhsan Fandi 11' (pen.) | Stadium: MP Selayang Stadium; Referee: Omar Al-Yaqoubi, Oman |

| 23 August 2017 | Brunei | 0–1 | Singapore | Selayang, Malaysia |
| | | | Khalid Wassadisalleh 74' (o.g.) | Stadium: MP Selayang Stadium |

=== 2018 ===
Friendly

| 17 March 2018 Friendly | Singapore | 0–0 | (Singapore) Warriors FC | Singapore |
| | | | | Stadium: Jalan Besar Stadium |

| 21 March 2018 Friendly | Singapore | 0–3 | Indonesia | Singapore |
| | | Report | Febri Haryadi 43'; Muhammad Hargianto 51'; Septian David 65' | Stadium: National Stadium |

| 20 June 2018 Friendly | Singapore | 0–2 | Myanmar | Singapore |
| | | Report | | Stadium: Jalan Besar Stadium |

| 26 June 2018 Friendly | Singapore | Cancelled | Macau | Singapore |
| | | | | Stadium: Jalan Besar Stadium |

2018 Hassanal Bolkiah Trophy

| 25 April 2018 Group B | Laos | 1–5 | Singapore | Bandar Seri Begawan, Brunei |
| | Phithack Kongmathilath 20' | | Rusyaidi Salime 18', 90+2'; Hami Syahin 40'; Ikhsan Fandi 45', 49' | Stadium: Hassanal Bolkiah National Stadium, Brunei; Referee: Amidillah Zainuddin, (Brunei) |

| 30 April 2018 Group B | Cambodia | 1–0 | Singapore | Bandar Seri Begawan, Brunei |
| | Sos Suhana 23' | | | Stadium: Track & Field Sports Complex, Brunei; Referee: Suhaizi Shukri, (Malaysia) |

| 2 May 2018 Semi Final | Timor-Leste | 2–1 | Singapore | Bandar Seri Begawan, Brunei |
| | Rufino Gama 76'; Henrique Cruz 78' | | Ikhsan Fandi 34' | Stadium: Track & Field Sports Complex, Brunei; Referee: Dmitry Mashentsev, (Kyrgyzstan) |

=== 2019 ===
Friendly

| March 2019 | (Japan) Kokushikan University | 4–0 | Singapore | Tokyo, Japan |
| | | Report |

| March 2019 | (Japan) Tokai University | 1–1 | Singapore | Tokyo, Japan |
| | | Report |

| 6 September 2019 | Fiji | 0–2 | Singapore | Singapore |
| | | | Daniel Goh 6'; Syahrul Sazali 60' | Stadium: Bishan Stadium |

| 9 October 2019 | United Arab Emirates | 3–0 | Singapore | Singapore |
| | 16'; 70'; 74' | | | Stadium: Bishan Stadium; Referee: Muhammad Zulfiqar (Singapore) |

| 13 October 2019 | Macau National Team | 0–4 | Singapore | Singapore |
| | | | Amiruldin Asraf 6'; Jordan Nicolas Vestering 10'; Haiqal Pashia 13'; Daniel Goh 33' | Stadium: Bishan Stadium |

| November 2019 | (Japan) Takushoku University | 2–0 | Singapore | Tokyo, Japan |

| November 2019 | (Japan) Meiji Gakuin University | 4–2 | Singapore | Tokyo, Japan |

| November 2019 | (Japan) Nippon Sport Science University | 0–0 | Singapore | Tokyo, Japan |

| 12 November 2019 | (Australia) Perth Glory U20 | 1–4 | Singapore | Singapore |
| | Bryce Bafford (penalty missed) 63; Alessandro Circatione 88' | | Haiqal Pashia 9'; Irfan Fandi 10'; Hami Syahin 57'; Faris Ramli 69' (pen.) | Stadium: Jalan Besar Stadium |

2020 AFC U-23 Championship qualification

| 22 March 2019 | Hong Kong | 1–1 | Singapore | Ulaanbaatar, Mongolia |
| | Tsui Wang Kit 52' | Report | Tan 53' | Stadium: MFF Football Centre; Attendance: 100; Referee: Hanna Hattab (Syria) |

| 24 March 2019 | North Korea | 1–1 | Singapore | Ulaanbaatar, Mongolia |
| | Pak Kwang-hun 7' | Report | Ikhsan 2' | Stadium: MFF Football Centre; Attendance: 98; Referee: Ali Reda (Lebanon) |

| 26 March 2019 | Mongolia | 1–3 | Singapore | Ulaanbaatar, Mongolia |
| | Khash-Erdene 3' | Report | Amiruldin 32'; Irfan 43'; Hami 71' | Stadium: MFF Football Centre; Attendance: 420; Referee: Ali Reda (Lebanon) |

Merlion Cup

| 7 June 2019 Semi Final | Singapore | 3–0 | Philippines | Singapore |
| | Amiruddin Asraf 28' Irfan Fandi 61' Ikhsan Fandi 68' | | | Stadium: Jalan Besar Stadium |

| 9 June 2019 Final | Singapore | 1–0 | Thailand | Singapore |
| | Ikhsan 35' | | | Stadium: Jalan Besar Stadium |

2019 Southeast Asian Games

| 26 November 2019 | Laos | 0–0 | Singapore | Manila, Philippines |
| | Somxay Keohanam (yellow card) 64' | Report | | Stadium: Rizal Memorial Stadium; Referee: Salman Ahmad Falahi (Qatar) |

| 28 November 2019 | Indonesia | 2–0 | Singapore | Manila, Philippines |
| | Osvaldo Haay 63'; Asnawi Bahar 73' | Report | | Stadium: Rizal Memorial Stadium; Referee: Majed Al-Shamrani (Saudi Arabia) |

| 1 December 2019 | Thailand | 3–0 | Singapore | Manila, Philippines |
| | Jaroensak Wonggorn 6'; Suphanat Mueanta 18'; Peerawat Akkatam 35' | Report | | Stadium: Biñan Football Stadium; Referee: Chen Hsin-chuan (Chinese Taipei) |

| 3 December 2019 | Vietnam | 1–0 | Singapore | Manila, Philippines |
| | Hà Đức Chinh 85' | Report | | Stadium: Rizal Memorial Stadium; Referee: Ammar Ashkanani (Kuwait) |

| 5 December 2019 | Brunei | 0–7 | Singapore | Manila, Philippines |
| | | | Irfan Fandi 3'; Ikhsan Fandi 68' 90+2' 90+3'; Saifullah Akbar 70'; Faris Ramli 84' 87' | Stadium: Rizal Memorial Stadium; Referee: Linjun Talaver (Philippines) |

=== 2021 ===
Friendly

| 29 May 2021 | Albirex Niigata (S) (Japan) | 2–4 | Singapore | Singapore |
| | | | Jacob Mahler; Ong Yu En | Stadium: Jalan Besar Stadium |

| 5 June 2021 | Tampines Rovers (Singapore) | 0–1 | Singapore | Singapore |
| | | | Jacob Mahler |

| 11 June 2021 | Lion City Sailors FC (Singapore) | 2–4 | Singapore | Singapore |
| | Jacob Mahler 36' (o.g.); Song Ui-young 90+4' | | Khairin Nadim 47' 75'; Jacob Mahler 53'; Zamani Zamri 90+2' | Stadium: Jalan Besar Stadium |

2022 AFC U-23 Asian Cup qualification

| 25 October 2021 2022 AFCU23Q | Singapore | 2–2 | Timor-Leste | Singapore |
| | Glenn Kweh 34'; Jordan Emaviwe 90+5' (yellow card); Jacob Mahler (yellow card) | | Elias 38'; Paulo Gali 41' (red card) 44' | Stadium: Jalan Besar Stadium; Attendance: 943; Referee: Majed Al Shamrani (Saudi Arabia) |

| 28 October 2021 2022 AFCU23Q | Philippines | 0–1 | Singapore | Singapore |
| | | Report | Glenn Kweh 34' | Stadium: Jalan Besar Stadium; Attendance: 984; Referee: Zaid Thamer (Iraq) |

| 31 October 2021 2022 AFCU23Q | South Korea | 5–1 | Singapore | Singapore |
| | Kim Chan 3'; Cho Sang-jun 5'; Park Jeong-in 24' 40'; Choi Jun 50' | Report | Nur Adam Abdullah 57' | Stadium: Jalan Besar Stadium; Attendance: 993; Referee: Hussein Abo Yehia (Lebanon) |

=== 2022 ===
2022 AFF U-23 Youth Championship

| 16 February 2022 | Thailand | 3–1 | Singapore | Phnom Penh, Cambodia |
| | Teerasak Poeiphimai 45', 62'; Niphitphon Wongpanya 55' | Report | Ilhan Fandi 16' | Stadium: Prince Stadium; Referee: Yudi Nurcahya (Indonesia) |

| 19 February 2022 | Vietnam | 7–0 | Singapore | Phnom Penh, Cambodia |
| | Nguyễn Văn Tùng 3', 37'; Đinh Xuân Tiến 33'; Dụng Quang Nho 56'; Nguyễn Ngọc Thắng 77'; Nguyễn Thành Khôi 89'; Vũ Tiến Long 90+5' | Report | | Stadium: Prince Stadium; Referee: Khuon Virak (Cambodia) |

Friendly

| 30 April 2022 | Albirex Niigata (S) (Japan) | v | Singapore | Singapore |
| | | | | Stadium: Jalan Besar Stadium |

2021 Southeast Asian Games

| 7 May 2022 | Singapore | 2–2 | Laos | Nam Định, Vietnam |
| | G. Kweh 89'; Emaviwe 90+6' | Report | Ekkamai 14'; Chony 50' | Stadium: Thiên Trường Stadium; Attendance: 10,152; Referee: Nivon Robesh Gamini (Sri Lanka) |

| 9 May 2022 | Singapore | 0–5 | Thailand | Nam Định, Vietnam |
| | | Report | Davis 45+1' (pen.); Stewart 48' (o.g.); Ekanit 51', 66'; Korawich 81' | Stadium: Thiên Trường Stadium; Attendance: 28,998; Referee: Adam Fazeel (Maldives) |

| 11 May 2022 | Singapore | 1–0 | Cambodia | Nam Định, Vietnam |
| | Akbar 36' | Report | | Stadium: Thiên Trường Stadium; Referee: Ngô Duy Lân (Vietnam) |

| 14 May 2022 | Singapore | 2–2 | Malaysia | Nam Định, Vietnam |
| | Shah 7'; Stewart 78' | Report | Luqman 4'; Faiz 82' | Stadium: Thiên Trường Stadium; Referee: Venkatesh Ramachandran (India) |

=== 2023 ===
Merlion Cup (24-26 March)

| 24 March 2023 Semi Final | Singapore | 0–1 | Hong Kong | Jalan Besar, Singapore |
| | | | Ichikawa 40' | Stadium: Jalan Besar Stadium; Referee: Farhan Mohd (Singapore) |

| 26 March 2023 3rd/4th Placing | Singapore | 1–2 | Cambodia | Jalan Besar, Singapore |
| | Jordan Emaviwe 71' | | Voeun Va 12'; Ky Rina 31' | Stadium: Jalan Besar Stadium; Referee: Syarqawi Buhari (Singapore) |

2023 Southeast Asian Games (29 April - 17 May)

| 30 April 2023 GS | Singapore | 1–3 | Thailand | Phnom Penh, Cambodia |
| | Nicky Melvin Singh 41' | Report | Teerasak Poeiphimai 8'; Achitpol Keereerom 38'; Purachet Thodsanit 49' | Stadium: Prince Stadium; Attendance: 2,573; Referee: Kim Hee-gon (Korea) |

| 3 May 2023 GS | Singapore | 1–3 | Vietnam | Phnom Penh, Cambodia |
| | Vũ Tiến Long 90+3' (o.g.) | Report | Nguyễn Văn Tùng 36'; Nguyễn Thái Sơn 43'; Ilhan Noor 80' (o.g.) | Stadium: Prince Stadium; Attendance: 2,267; Referee: Shen Yinhao (China) |

| 6 May 2023 GS | Singapore | 0–0 | Laos | Phnom Penh, Cambodia |
| | Syahadat Masnawi (penalty missed) 65 | Report | | Stadium: Prince Stadium; Referee: Khin Ouseyha (Cambodia) |

| 11 May 2023 GS | Singapore | 0–7 | Malaysia | Phnom Penh, Cambodia |
| | | Report | Saravanan Thirumurugan 15' 48' 54' 63'; Haqimi Azim 45+3'; Mukhairi Ajmal 87'; Aiman Afif 90+4' | Stadium: Prince Stadium; Attendance: 1,320; Referee: Hasan Akrami (Iran) |

Friendly

| 25 August 2023 | North Bangkok University (Thailand) | v | Singapore | Thailand |
| | | | | Stadium: North Bangkok University |

| 29 August 2023 | Bangkok United (Thailand) | v | Singapore | Thailand |
| | | | | Stadium: North Bangkok University |

| 1 September 2023 | Thailand | 2–0 | Singapore | Chonburi, Thailand |
| | Anan 82', 89' | | | Stadium: Chonburi Stadium |

2024 AFC U-23 Asian Cup qualification (4-12 September)

| 6 September 2023 | Singapore | 0–3 | Yemen | Phú Thọ, Vietnam |
| | | Report | Ahmed Maher 32' 45+1'; Hamzah Hanash 41' | Stadium: Việt Trì Stadium; Attendance: 1,326; Referee: Jonathan Barreiro (Australia) |

| 9 September 2023 | Guam | 1–1 | Singapore | Phú Thọ, Vietnam |
| | Ngeschekle Meyar 88' | Report | Farhan Zulkifli 63' (pen.) | Stadium: Việt Trì Stadium; Attendance: 1,238; Referee: Manir Ahmmad (Bangladesh) |

| 12 September 2023 | Vietnam | 2–2 | Singapore | Phú Thọ, Vietnam |
| | Nguyễn Đình Bắc 13' (pen.); Nguyễn Hữu Nam 78' | Report | Nguyễn Hồng Phúc 58' (o.g.); Zikos Chua 85' | Stadium: Việt Trì Stadium; Attendance: 11,268; Referee: Owen Goldrick (Australia) |

=== 2025 ===
| 8 August Closed-doors friendly | Philippines | 0–0 | Singapore | Pasay, Philippines |
| --:-- UTC+8 | | Report | | Stadium: MOA Sky Football Pitch |

| 13 August Friendly | Malaysia | 0–1 | Singapore | Malaysia |
| --:-- UTC+8 |

| 3 September 2026 AFC U-23 Asian Cup qualification | Yemen | 2–1 | Singapore | Việt Trì, Vietnam |
| | Anwar Hussein Al Turaiqi (penalty missed) 19; Radhi Wadeea Ebrahim 20'; Abdulaziz KhamisMasnom 45+1' (pen.) | | Louka Tan-Vaissiere 80' | Stadium: Việt Trì Stadium; Attendance: 322; Referee: Bangbang Syamsudar (Indonesia) |

| 6 September 2026 AFC U-23 Asian Cup qualification | Singapore | 0–1 | Vietnam | Việt Trì, Vietnam |
| | | | Lê Văn Thuận 79' | Stadium: Việt Trì Stadium; Attendance: 6,046; Referee: Choi Hyun-jai (South Korea) |

| 9 September 2026 AFC U-23 Asian Cup qualification | Singapore | 1–4 | Bangladesh | Việt Trì, Vietnam |
| | Khairin Nadim 90+1' | | Fahamedul Islam 70'; Al-Amin 72'; Tanil Salik 79'; Shekh Morsalin 82' | Stadium: Việt Trì Stadium; Referee: Resul Mämmedow (Turkmenistan) |

| 15 November Friendly | United Arab Emirates | 6–0 | Singapore | Dubai, UAE |
| | | | | Stadium: UAE FA Pitch 1 |

| 18 November Friendly | Iraq | 2–0 | Singapore | Dubai, UAE |
| | | | | Stadium: UAE FA Pitch 1 |

| 6 December 2025 SEA Games | Singapore | 1–3 | Timor-Leste | Bangkok, Thailand |
| --:-- UTC+7 | Amir 11' | Report | Canavaro 19'; Correia 42'; Olagar 45+1' | Stadium: Rajamangala Stadium; Referee: Asker Nadjafaliev (Uzbekistan) |

| 11 December 2025 SEA Games | Singapore | 0–3 | Thailand | Bangkok, Thailand |
| --:-- UTC+7 | | Report | Siraphop 49'; Yotsakorn B. 51', 55' | Stadium: Rajamangala Stadium; Attendance: 7,896; Referee: Mooud Bonyadifard (Iran) |

=== 2026 ===
| 25 March Closed-doors friendly | Singapore | Cancelled | United Arab Emirates | Singapore |
| --:-- UTC+8 |

| 28 March Closed-doors friendly | Singapore | Cancelled | United Arab Emirates | Singapore |
| --:-- UTC+8 |

| 30 March Closed-doors friendly | Singapore | 0–1 | (Malaysia) JDT III | Singapore |
| --:-- UTC+8 |

| 27 September Closed-doors friendly | Singapore | 1–0 | (Malaysia) JDT II | Jalan Besar, Singapore |
| --:-- UTC+8 | | | | Stadium: Jalan Besar Stadium |

| 10 November Gia Lai U-23 VTV Cup | Singapore | 0–0 | Qatar | Gia Lai, Vietnam |
| 15:00 UTC+7 | | Report | | Stadium: Pleiku Stadium; Referee: Nguyễn Mạnh Hải (Vietnam) |

| 12 November Gia Lai U-23 VTV Cup | Singapore | 0–1 | Vietnam | Gia Lai, Vietnam |
| 19:00 UTC+7 | | Report | Nguyễn Bảo Long 70' | Stadium: Pleiku Stadium; Referee: Clifford Daypuyat (Philippines) |

| 14 November Gia Lai U-23 VTV Cup | Thailand | 3–1 | Singapore | Gia Lai, Vietnam |
| 15:00 UTC+7 | Chaiyasit 33'; Phongsakon 64'; Paripan 79' | Report | Syafiz 41' | Stadium: Pleiku Stadium; Referee: Đỗ Khánh Nam (Vietnam) |

== Honours ==
=== Regional ===
- Southeast Asian Games
  - Bronze medal (3): 2007, 2009 and 2013
- Merlion Cup
  - Champions (1): 2019
- Pestabola Merdeka
  - Third Place (1): 2013

== See also ==
- Singapore national football team
- Singapore national youth football team
- Young Lions
- Singapore women's national football team
