= Ikhsan Fandi =

Singaporean footballer (born 1999)

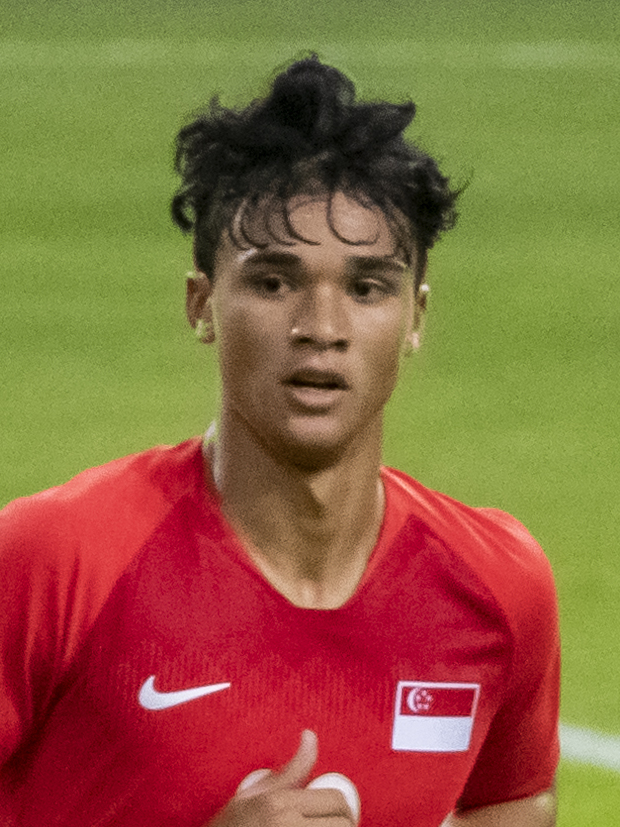
- Ikhsan playing for Singapore in 2018

Personal information
- Full name: Ikhsan bin Fandi Ahmad
- Date of birth: 9 April 1999 (age 27)
- Place of birth: Singapore
- Height: 1.81 m (5 ft 11 in)
- Positions: Forward; winger

Team information
- Current team: Thespa Gunma
- Number: 90

Youth career
- 2012–2013: National Football Academy
- 2013: Hércules
- 2014: Barnechea
- 2014–2015: Universidad Católica

Senior career*
Years	Team	Apps	(Gls)
2016	Home United	4	(0)
2017–2018	Young Lions	30	(8)
2019–2020	Raufoss	36	(7)
2020–2021	Jerv	38	(9)
2022–2026	BG Pathum United	100	(50)
2025	→ Ratchaburi (loan)	12	(7)
2026–	Thespa Gunma	6	(1)

International career^{‡}
2017–2021	Singapore U22	20	(8)
2017–2021	Singapore U23	6	(0)
2017–	Singapore	49	(23)
Medal record
Men's football
Representing Singapore
Merlion Cup
Winner	2019 Singapore
- * Club domestic league appearances and goals as of 04:28, 13 July 2026 (UTC) ‡ National team caps and goals as of 5 June 2026

Ikhsan bin Fandi Ahmad (born 9 April 1999), commonly known as Ikhsan Fandi, is a Singaporean professional footballer who plays either as a forward or a winger for J3 League club Thespa Gunma, and the Singapore national team.

Ikhsan began his footballing career through his successful father, Singaporean football player Fandi Ahmad, by going through the youth system at the National Football Academy (NFA), with subsequent stints and trials at various clubs before debuting as a professional at the age of 17 at local club Home United (Note: Home United has been known as the Lion City Sailors since 2019.) in 2016.

Ikhsan would move home to the Young Lions in 2017, before signing for Norwegian clubs Raufoss IL and FK Jerv, respectively, netting a total of 16 goals in all competitions. In 2021, he moved back to Asia, signing for Thailand's BG Pathum United. In 2026, he moved to Japan's Thespa Gunma. Ikhsan currently holds the record of netting the fastest four goals scored by a player in Thai League history in eleven minutes against PT Prachuap on 5 April 2022. He is also the first Singaporean player to score in the AFC Champions League knockout stage.

== Early life and education ==
Ikhsan was born on 9 April 1999 at the Thomson Medical Centre in Novena, Singapore. He is the second eldest son of Singaporean football player Fandi Ahmad and South African-born former model Wendy Jacobs. He has four siblings, one older brother, Irfan, who plays for Port and two younger brothers, Ilhan, a club teammate who plays for BG Pathum United and Iryan, who plays for Young Lions and sister Iman who is a singer, actress and model.

His grandfather, Ahmad Wartam, was an ex-national goalkeeper. Hafiz Abu Sujad and the national team's physiotherapist Nurhafizah are the cousins of his father, Fandi Ahmad.

Growing up in a wealthy family of professional footballers, Ikhsan soon started playing at an early age. Ikhsan attended the Singapore Sports School at Woodlands.

== Club career ==
=== Youth ===
In March 2013, Ikhsan and his older brother Irfan Fandi had an opportunity to secure their first overseas trial, with Hércules, a professional club playing in the Spanish second division. However, the pair ultimately failed to secure contracts with the club due to issues relating to visas. Irfan and Ikhsan left the club after contracts could not be secured.

Later in 2013, the pair managed to sign for Chilean side Barnechea, having secured two-year contracts with the Chilean Primera División club.

Ikhsan and Irfan then joined Chilean Primera División club Universidad Católica.

=== Home United ===
Ikhsan returned to Singapore and signed for Home United together with his brother Irfan ahead of the 2016 S.League season. He made his senior debut in a 2–2 draw against Warriors FC, coming on as a substitute for Khairul Nizam in the 85th minute. Around this time, he was often away for National Service (NS) together with his brother Irfan, and so he only managed to end the season with 4 appearances and 0 goals.

=== Young Lions ===
In 2017, it was announced that Ikhsan would sign for the under-23 football team, Young Lions, ahead of the 2017 S.League season. It was revealed on 17 March 2017 that, although Ikhsan has yet to make an appearance for his new club, his former club, Club Deportivo Universidad Católica, was interested in re-signing Ikhsan and his brother Irfan after they finish their national service obligations. 5 games into the season and with the club still pointless, Ikhsan has yet to make an appearance.

On 23 April 2017, Ikhsan made his debut for the Young Lions against Tampines Rovers. In total, Ikhsan played 10 league games for the Young Lions while serving his national service as an infantry trooper. Following the conclusion of the season, it was reported that Ikhsan, along with brother Irfan, is set for a trial with English club Leeds United in March, after the end of his national service.

Ikhsan scored his professional goal in game week 7 against Hougang United. He also assisted with another goal. He stayed on with the Young Lions for the 2018 Singapore Premier League season and scored 8 goals during his entire time at the club.

=== Raufoss IL ===
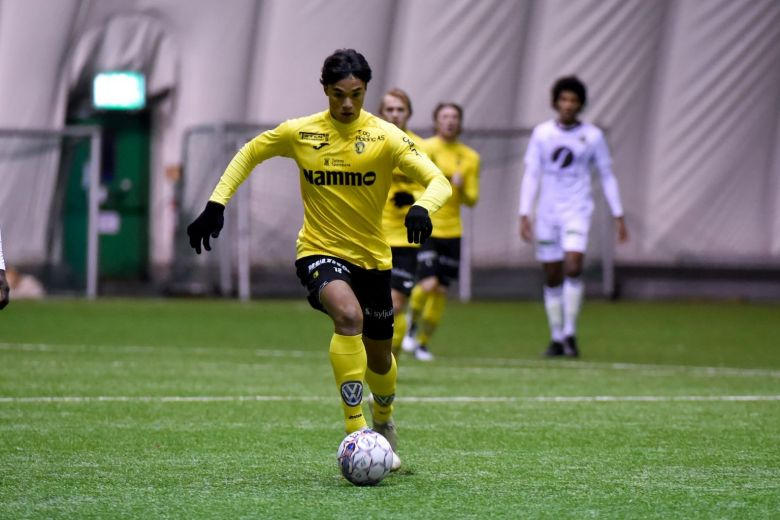
Ikhsan playing for Raufoss IL

In January 2019, Ikhsan travelled to Norway for trials for the clubs there. After impressing in his stint there, Ikhsan was offered a 2-year contract with the newly promoted Norwegian First Division club Raufoss IL. Ikhsan played his first match for the club in a friendly against Mjondalen IF on 12 January. He came on as a substitute in the 64th minute in the 3–1 loss. He scored his first goal for the club in a friendly match on 25 January 2019 in a 6–1 win against Elverum; scoring a rebound off a save from the goalkeeper to score the third goal.

Ikhsan made his league debut on 8 April 2019, against Sandefjord Fotball, replacing Anton Henningsson. He hit five goals in three starts in a period between May and June and ended his first season with Raufoss with 6 goals and 1 assist in 28 matches.

On March 1, 2020, Eliteserien club IK Start invited Ikhsan for a three-day trial followed by a training camp from March 5 to 13 in Marbella, Spain, where they were scheduled to play three friendlies. However, due to the COVID-19 pandemic, Start played only one match — a 2–0 win over fellow Norwegian side Grorud IL — and Ikhsan scored during his 75-minute outing against the newly promoted second-tier outfit. Start coach Jóhannes Harðarson was impressed with his performance and cited a possible transfer. However, with the league being delayed, the Norwegian Football Federation imposing a training ban on clubs until the end of the month, and the transfer window closing on April 1, the move to the top-flight club was held up. The move to the IK Start eventually failed to materialise after the club and player could not agree on salary terms and contract length.

Ikhsan scored his first goal for the club in the 2020–21 season in his fifth appearance and first start of the season when he climbed highest to glance in a cross from right-back Edvard Race in the 38th minute to give Raufoss the lead in a 3–1 win against Åsane on 30 August 2020. Having played just 425 minutes over 11 matches for Raufoss in 2020, scoring once, Ikhsan was keen to move away from Raufoss.

=== FK Jerv ===
Ikhsan secured a transfer deadline day move on 5 October 2020 from Raufoss IL to fellow Norwegian side FK Jerv before the transfer window closed and signed a contract until 2022. FK Jerv is understood to have paid Raufoss over US$50,000 with a sell-on clause for Ikhsan. Ikhsan made his debut off the bench 2 days after signing, in a league match against Hamkam. He scored his first goal for the club on his full debut in a 4–2 win against his former club Raufoss on October 10, 2020. Ikhsan made his second successive start and scored in a 2–1 win over Ullensaker/Kisa IL. He timed his run to head in a cross from the right by Ghanaian midfielder Michael Baidoo, scoring his second goal for the club in his third game and helping his new club to their fourth successive victory in the league.

On 24 October 2020, Ikhsan notched his third and fourth goals for FK Jerv in just his fifth game, helping the club to a 4–2 win against Øygarden FK, with a 50th-minute tap-in, before heading in his second from a corner in the 64th minute. On 14 December 2020, Ikhsan notched his fifth goal for the club in the final game of the 2020 1.divisjon. He came on at half-time and equalised from close range in the 90th minute against Stjørdals/Blink IL. Ikhsan has called it the "most important of his career", after the result preserved FK Jerv's place in the Norwegian second tier.

On 13 June 2021, after missing the first four games of the 2021 1.divisjon due to an injury, Ikhsan scored his first goal of the season just three minutes into his first appearance after coming on as a substitute at the 72nd minute. Ikhsan latched on to a cut-back from Willis Furtado, and finished past Igor Spiridonov from close range, to equalise for his club against Bryne FK. He then helped to set up his club's winner, in the second minute of added time, playing a one-two with Thomas Zernichow, who later back-heeled for John Olav Norheim to make it 2–1.

On 23 June 2021, Ikhsan opened the scoring on his first start since returning from injury in a 1–1 draw against Strømmen IF after a botched interception by Magnus Tvedte, allowing Ikhsan to flick the ball and put it past Simen Kjellevold Lillevik for his second goal in three matches. The 2021 season ended in Ikhsan's club, FK Jerv, being promoted to the Norway 1st division league, Eliteserien, after the club had won 8–7 on penalties in a promotion play-off match against SK Brann on 16 December 2021. Ikhsan congratulated his club, adding that "I feel so happy and proud of my club for securing promotion, and I'm looking forward to featuring and playing well against the big boys in the Eliteserien next season."

=== BG Pathum United ===
"I want to make a name for myself in the Thai league, show what I am capable of and show I can fight among the best in the region, even with the foreigners, and score as many goals as possible to support the team."

— Ikhsan shortly after signing for BG Pathum United.

==== 2021–22 season ====
Around this period, however, there were rumours that various clubs, especially in Asia, were interested in Ikhsan, after observing his performances in Norway. Such rumours turned out to be true when on 22 December 2021, Thai League 1 champions BG Pathum United announced on their Instagram account that Ikhsan has transferred to the club during the middle of their 2021–22 season, on a two-and-a-half-year contract. BG Pathum had paid FK Jerv TH฿2 million (Note: Equivalent to about S$80,000 (SGD) and 530,000kr (NOK).) for Ikhsan's services.

On 6 April 2022, Ikhsan secured his first hat-trick for the club after scoring 4 goals in a league game against PT Prachuap that ended 7–2. Ikhsan's 4 goal haul in 11 minutes placed him only 2nd in the fastest goal hauls of the 21st century in top flight league football ahead of Kylian Mbappé's 13 minutes against Olympique Lyonnais on 7 October 2018 during the 2018–19 Ligue 1 season, who also scored 4, and behind Robert Lewandowski's 5 goals in 9 minutes (Note: Lewandowski scored his 4th goal by the 6th minute.) against VfL Wolfsburg on 22 September 2016 during the 2015–16 Bundesliga season.

On 24 April 2022, Ikhsan scored his first goals in Asia's continental competition, the AFC Champions League. He recorded a brace against Philippines league champions, United City in the 2022 AFC Champions League's group stage, ultimately helping his club to win the game 3–1, securing BG Pathum United's place at the top of the group. With the 2 goals, Ikhsan has scored across all competitions for BG Pathum United in the 2021–22 season.

==== 2022–23 season ====
On 6 August 2022, Ikhsan won his first silverware with BG Pathum United when he scored in the 38th minute to help BG Pathum clinch the 2022 Thailand Champions Cup with a 3–2 win.

On 19 August 2022, Ikhsan, along with his brother Irfan, became the first Singaporeans to reach the AFC Champions League's quarter-finals after their club defeated Hong Kong's Kitchee SC 4–0. Ikhsan was the scorer for one of the goals, with a turbo strike from the outside of the box.

==== 2023–24 season ====
On 2 December 2023, Ikhsan returned from a long-term injury and came on from the bench when his team was 2–0 down in a league match against Port FC where he assisted Freddy Álvarez in the match where BG Pathum United went on to win the match 3–2. In the next match on 9 December, he scored a header to seal a 2–1 league win against Rachaburi. On 9 March 2024, Ikhsan scored a brace against Sukhothai in a 7–1 home victory. He then scored another brace in the season on 6 April 2024 against Chiangrai United helping his club to win 3–2. He netted 11 goals in 25 appearances in the 2023–24 season. On 1 June 2024, Ikhsan signed a 3-year contract extension with BG Pathum United after amassing 37 goals in 67 matches in 2½ seasons.

On 16 June, Ikhsan won his second trophy at the club, playing the full match in a 1–0 win over Muangthong United, which won the 2023–24 Thai League Cup. He had also scored a goal in the match, but it was eventually canceled as his teammate had fouled the goalkeeper while providing the assist to him for the goal.

==== 2024–25 season ====
After being injured for nearly five months, Ikhsan returned to action, coming on as a substitute in the 74th minute for Raniel in a 1–0 loss against Nakhon Ratchasima on 24 November. In his second match on 1 December against Bangkok United, Ikhsan came on from the bench at half time, where he would go on to score a crucial 90+2' stoppage time goal to secure a 1–0 win in the league.

==== Loan to Ratchaburi ====
On 8 June 2025, it was announced that Ikhsan was loaned out to another Thai League 1 club Ratchaburi until the end of the 2025–26 season. During the first round of the Thai FA Cup on 29 October, he scored a hat-trick in a 3–2 away win against Lopburi City. Ikhsan then scored a brace in a 7–0 thrashing win against Hong Kong side Eastern in an AFC Champions League Two group stage fixture on 5 November. Ikhsan then scored a goal in the 90+5' stoppage time putting his team to a crucial 2–0 win over Vietnamese club Thép Xanh Nam Định which then secured Ratchaburi as runners-up in the AFC Champions League group stage thus qualifying to the round of 16. Due to his goalscoring record of 7 goals in 12 appearances across all competition for Ratchaburi, he was recalled by BG Pathum United on 19 December 2025 for the remainder of the 2025–26 season.

==== 2025–26 season ====
In his first appearance of the season for BG Pathum United on 10 January 2026, Ikhsan scored in a 1–1 draw against Lamphun Warriors. During the 2025–26 Thai League Cup round of 16 tie against Muangthong United on 21 January, Ikhsan scored a brace in a 2–0 win which send his team to the quarter-finals. On 3 March, Ikhsan scored a brace in a 2–1 win over Sukhothai in a league match.

Ikhsan departed the club at the end of the season after spending five seasons with the team. During his time with the club, he made 100 appearances, scored 50 goals and contributed five assists.

=== Thespa Gunma ===
On 7 July 2026, it was announced that Ikhsan had joined J3 League club Thespa Gunma on a two-year contract. Ikhsan scored his first goal for the club in a 3–2 league defeat to Reilac Shiga on 22 August 2026.

== International career ==
"When I feel down, I always think about all the sacrifices they've made for me, why I'm here. To make them proud, to make the Singapore fans proud and to fly our flag high."

— Ikhsan talking about the sacrifices that his family had made and the pride of representing his country.

=== Youth ===
Ikhsan was part of the Singapore U16, which won third place in the 26th edition of the Lion City Cup in 2015. He scored a brace against Liverpool U15. The Singapore side were 3–0 down at half time, but Ikhsan came on and scored a hat-trick, resulting in the game ending in a 3–3 tie. Both teams went on to penalties, and Singapore lost to the English team by 5–3 on penalties to clinch third.

He was called up to the Singapore U22 ahead of the 2017 SEA Games and broke his duck by converting a penalty against India before hitting two scorchers from distance in a 4–1 thumping of Brunei in the AFC U-23 Asian Cup qualifiers in July. He played all 4 of the team's games at the 2017 SEA Games, scoring one goal.

=== Senior ===
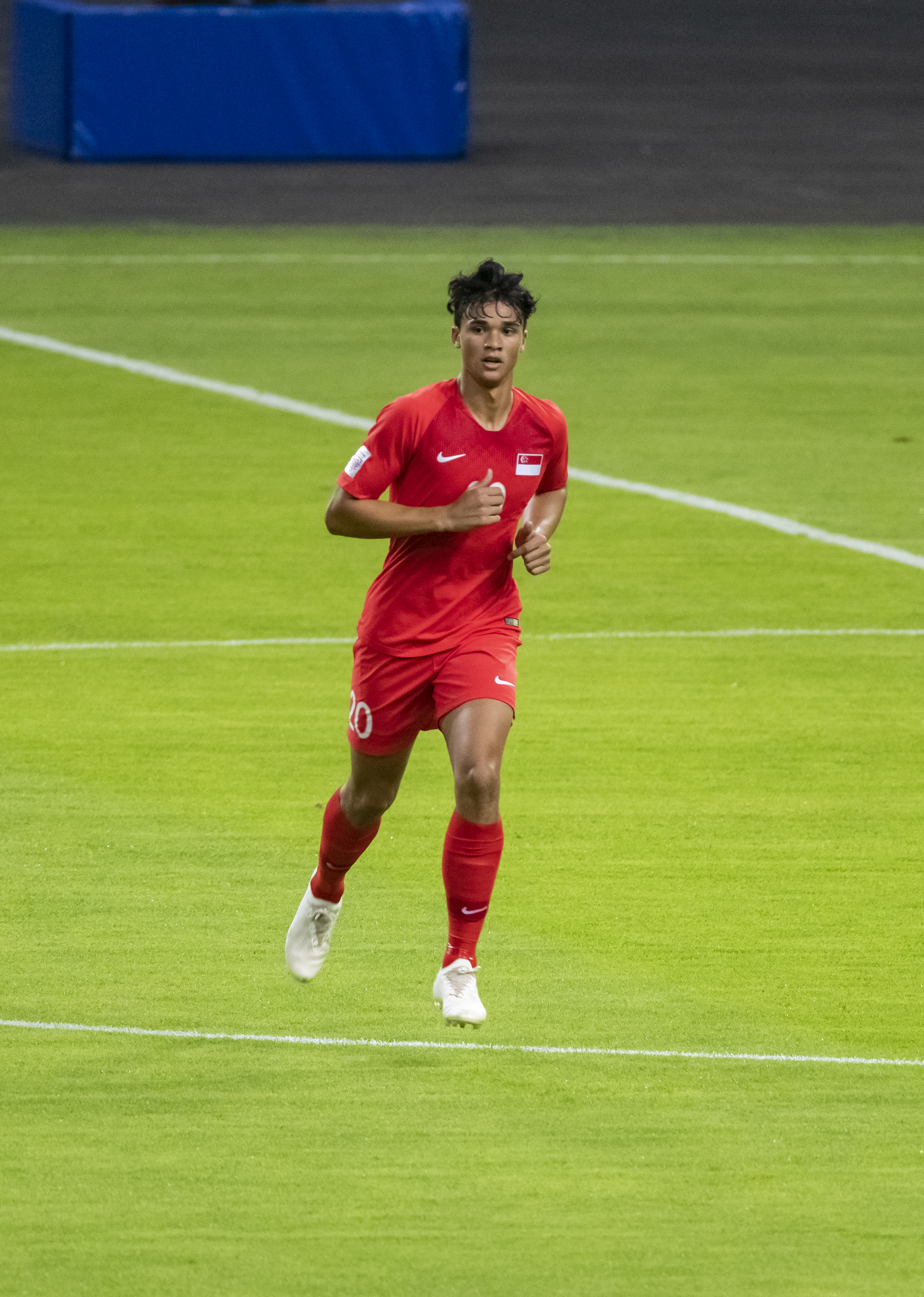
Ikhsan playing for Singapore in 2018

Ikhsan was called up to the national team for the friendly against Hong Kong and the 2019 AFC Asian Cup qualifiers against Turkmenistan on 31 August and 5 September respectively. He made his debut against Hong Kong after coming on for Khairul Amri in the 71st minute. He scored his first international goal while winning his fifth cap on 7 September 2018 in an international friendly against Mauritius. He scored his second goal in the following game, helping Singapore to a 2–0 win over Fiji in a friendly match. He notched his third goal in his eighth cap against Cambodia.

Ikhsan made his AFF Championship debut in the 2018 tournament on 9 November, with a 1–0 win over Indonesia. He scored his first competitive goals for Singapore in a 6–1 demolition of Timor-Leste in the 2018 AFF Championship, getting on the score sheet twice. He notched his eighth goal for Singapore in only his eighteenth cap when he scored in a 2–1 win over Yemen in a 2022 FIFA World Cup qualification match.

Ikhsan received a call up to the national team for a friendly against Afghanistan and the 2022 FIFA World Cup qualification matches held in Riyadh against Palestine, Uzbekistan, and Saudi Arabia along with brothers, Irfan and Ilhan. This was the first time all three brothers were called up but due to a knee injury he sustained during pre-season, Ikhsan ended up withdrawing from the national team with no further replacements.

On 25 December 2021, in the second leg of the 2020 AFF Championship semi-final match against Indonesia, Ikhsan played in goal in the 119th minute after goalkeeper Hassan Sunny was sent off. By this point, Singapore was down to eight men. Ikhsan saved a free kick and did not concede as the match ended 4–2 after extra time, where he also gained nationwide fame for his heroic performance playing as a goalkeeper.

On 26 March 2022, against Malaysia, Ikhsan played alongside his brothers Irfan and Ilhan, who had come on as a substitute in the 71st minute. It was the first time that the three Fandi brothers played in the same match for the national team together. It was also the first time in international professional footballing history to have three brothers playing for the national team in the same game. Ikhsan scored a double, giving Singapore a 2–1 win in the 'Causeway Derby'.

Ikhsan scored his first international hat-trick on 14 June 2022, helping Singapore to a 6–2 win over Myanmar in the final match of their 2023 AFC Asian Cup third-round qualifiers. His hat-trick takes his tally to 16 goals in 31 matches for the Lions, as well as earning himself the title of 18th top goal scorer in Singapore's history. He notched his 17th goal scoring from a free kick in his 32nd appearance for the Lions in a 1–1 draw against India.

Ikhsan missed out on the 2022 AFF Championship tournament as he suffered a serious knee injury in a friendly match against Maldives on 17 December 2022 at the Jalan Besar Stadium.

On 21 November 2023, Ikhsan returned to football action after suffering a long-term injury in December 2022, coming on as a substitute during the 2026 FIFA World Cup qualification against Thailand. He would later be involved in scoring a thunderous goal from outside the box against Thailand in the reverse fixtures at the Rajamangala Stadium on 11 June 2024; while Singapore would lose 3–1 to Thailand, that goal proved to have made the difference as it killed Thailand's hope to advance to the final round in which the Chinese fans praise and applaud Ikhsan performances.

In Ikhsan return to the national team after a year long absence, he scored a brace in a 3–1 friendly win against Maldives on 5 June 2025.

== Personal life ==
Ikhsan served his National Service (NS) obligations for the Singapore Armed Forces (SAF) from 2016 to 2018. During his stint, he continued to play and train professional football under the SAF Sportsmen Scheme by the Ministry of Defence (MINDEF) that gives special dispensation for local athletes with flexible timetables for sports events, including representing Singapore at international competitions.

Ikhsan has stated that aside from football, he enjoys swimming and visiting the island of Sentosa. His favourite local breakfast is having two egg pratas.

During his time at Raufoss IL, Ikhsan revealed in a podcast interview that he had shared a room with teammates Parfait Bizoza, Emil Bohinen and Lasse Berg Johnsen.

Ikhsan has a sponsorship deal with sportswear and equipment supplier Adidas.

== Career statistics ==
=== Club ===
As of match played 21 Nov 2026

Appearances and goals by club, season and competition
Club	Season	League			National cup		League cup		Continental		Other		Total	
Club	Season	Division	Apps	Goals	Apps	Goals	Apps	Goals	Apps	Goals	Apps	Goals	Apps	Goals
Home United	2016	S.League	4	0	0	0	—	—	—		—		4	0
Young Lions	2017	S.League	10	0	0	0	0	0	—		—		10	0
Young Lions	2018	Singapore Premier League	20	8	0	0	0	0	—		—		20	8
Young Lions	Total		30	8	0	0	0	0	0	0	0	0	30	8
Raufoss	2019	1.divisjon	26	5	2	1	0	0	—		—		28	6
Raufoss	2020	1.divisjon	11	1	0	0	0	0	—		—		11	1
Raufoss	Total		37	6	2	1	0	0	0	0	0	0	39	7
Jerv	2020	1.divisjon	14	5	0	0	0	0	—		—		14	5
Jerv	2021	1.divisjon	22	2	2	2	0	0	—		—		24	4
Jerv	Total		36	7	2	2	0	0	0	0	0	0	38	9
BG Pathum United	2021–22	Thai League 1	14	8	2	1	2	4	0	0	—		18	13
BG Pathum United	2022–23	Thai League 1	14	5	2	4	0	0	7 (Note: Appearance(s) in AFC Champions League Elite)	3	1 (Note: Appearance(s) in Thailand Champions Cup)	1	24	13
BG Pathum United	2023–24	Thai League 1	18	8	1	1	4	2	2	0	—		25	11
BG Pathum United	2024–25	Thai League 1	12	2	2	1	0	0	0	0	7 (Note: Three appearances in ASEAN Club Championship, four appearances in Singapore Cup)	0	21	3
BG Pathum United	2025–26	Thai League 1	7	5	2	4	0	0	0	0	2	1	12	10
BG Pathum United	Total		59	24	7	7	6	6	9	3	8	1	100	50
Ratchaburi (loan)	2025–26	Thai League 1	5	0	1	3	0	0	6	4	0	0	12	7
Thespa Gunma	2026–27	J3 League	7	1	0	0	0	0	—		0	0	7	1
Career total			178	46	12	13	6	6	15	7	8	1	219	73

- Young Lions are ineligible for qualification to AFC competitions in their respective leagues.
- Raufoss are ineligible for qualification to UEFA competitions in their respective leagues.

=== International ===
Appearances and goals by national team and year
National team	Year	Apps	Goals
Singapore
Singapore	2017	4	0
Singapore	2018	8	5
Singapore	2019	6	3
Singapore	2020	0	0
Singapore	2021	7	3
Singapore	2022	8	6
Singapore	2023	1	0
Singapore	2024	4	1
Singapore	2025	3	4
Total		41	22

=== International goals ===
Scores and results list Singapore's goal tally first.

No.	Date	Venue	Opponent	Score	Result	Competition
1.	7 September 2018	Bishan Stadium, Bishan, Singapore	Mauritius	1–1	1–1	Friendly
2.	11 September 2018	Bishan Stadium, Bishan, Singapore	Fiji	2–0	2–0	Friendly
3.	16 October 2018	Phnom Penh Olympic Stadium, Phnom Penh, Cambodia	Cambodia	2–1	2–1	Friendly
4.	21 November 2018	National Stadium, Kallang, Singapore	Timor-Leste	3–1	6–1	2018 AFF Championship
5.	21 November 2018	National Stadium, Kallang, Singapore	Timor-Leste	4–1	6–1	2018 AFF Championship
6.	5 September 2019	National Stadium, Kallang, Singapore	Yemen	1–0	2–2	2022 FIFA World Cup qualification
7.	15 October 2019	National Stadium, Kallang, Singapore	Uzbekistan	1–1	1–3	2022 FIFA World Cup qualification
8.	19 November 2019	Shaikh Ali Bin Mohammed Al-Khalifa Stadium, Muharraq, Bahrain	Yemen	1–0	2–1	2022 FIFA World Cup qualification
9.	5 December 2021	National Stadium, Kallang, Singapore	Myanmar	2–0	3–0	2020 AFF Championship
10.	5 December 2021	National Stadium, Kallang, Singapore	Myanmar	3–0	3–0	2020 AFF Championship
11.	22 December 2021	National Stadium, Kallang, Singapore	Indonesia	1–1	1–1	2020 AFF Championship
12.	26 March 2022	National Stadium, Kallang, Singapore	Malaysia	1–0	2–1	2022 FAS Tri-Nations Series
13.	26 March 2022	National Stadium, Kallang, Singapore	Malaysia	2–1	2–1	2022 FAS Tri-Nations Series
14.	14 June 2022	Dolen Omurzakov Stadium, Bishkek, Kyrgyzstan	Myanmar	1–0	6–2	2023 AFC Asian Cup qualification
15.	14 June 2022	Dolen Omurzakov Stadium, Bishkek, Kyrgyzstan	Myanmar	4–1	6–2	2023 AFC Asian Cup qualification
16.	14 June 2022	Dolen Omurzakov Stadium, Bishkek, Kyrgyzstan	Myanmar	5–2	6–2	2023 AFC Asian Cup qualification
17.	24 September 2022	Thống Nhất Stadium, Ho Chi Minh City, Vietnam	India	1–0	1–1	2022 VFF Tri-Nations Series
18.	11 June 2024	Rajamangala Stadium, Bangkok, Thailand	Thailand	1–1	1–3	2026 FIFA World Cup qualification
19.	5 June 2025	Bishan Stadium, Bishan, Singapore	Maldives	2–0	3–1	Friendly
20.	5 June 2025	Bishan Stadium, Bishan, Singapore	Maldives	3–0	3–1	Friendly
21.	10 June 2025	National Stadium, Dhaka, Bangladesh	Bangladesh	2–0	2–1	2027 AFC Asian Cup qualification
22.	9 October 2025	National Stadium, Kallang, Singapore	India	1–0	1–1	2027 AFC Asian Cup qualification
23.	31 May 2026	Jalan Besar Stadium, Kallang, Singapore	Mongolia	4–0	4–0	Friendly

== Honours ==
=== Club ===
BG Pathum United

- Thailand Champions Cup: 2022
- Thai League Cup: 2023–24

=== International ===
Singapore U22

- Merlion Cup: 2019

=== Individual ===
- Thai League Dream ASEAN XI
- 2021–22 Thai League 1 Player of the Month: April
