= Irfan Fandi =

Singaporean footballer

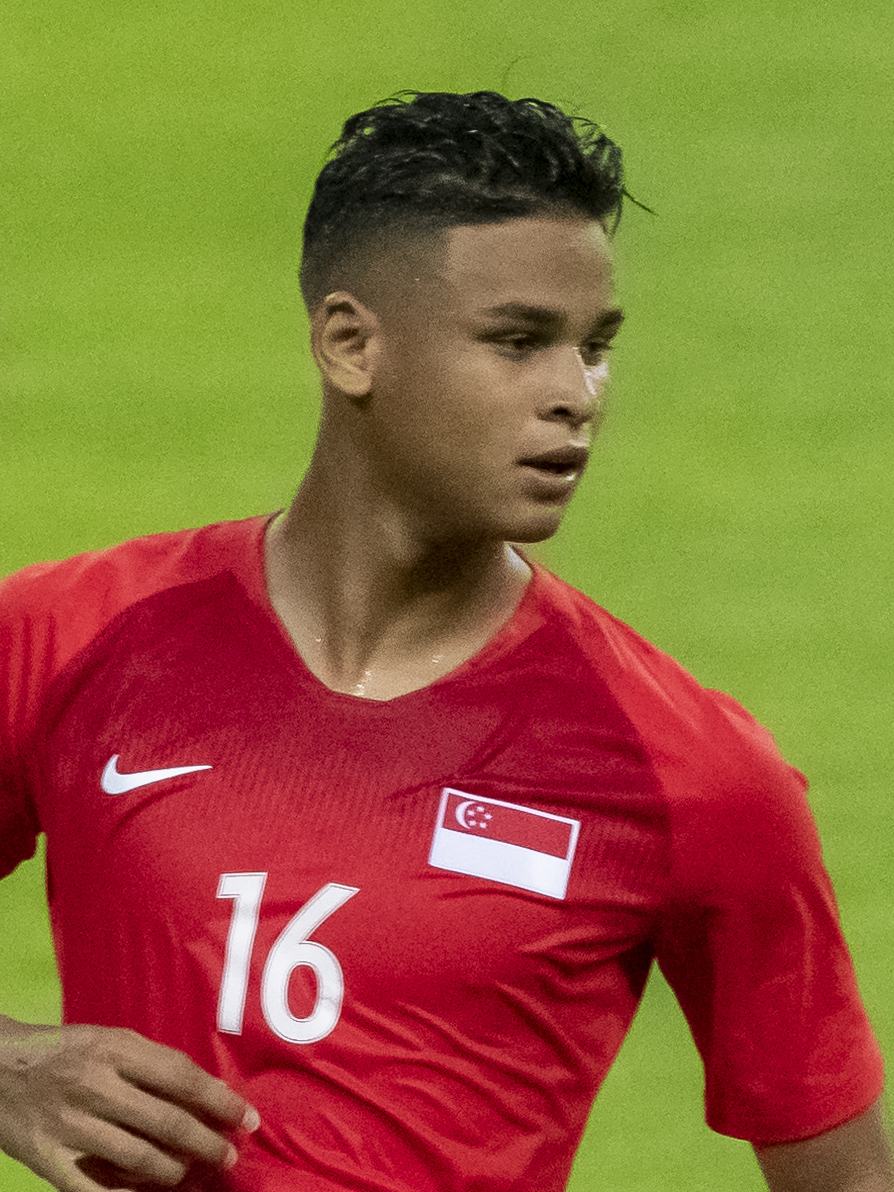
- Irfan playing for Singapore in 2018

Personal information
- Full name: Irfan bin Fandi Ahmad
- Date of birth: 13 August 1997 (age 29)
- Place of birth: Singapore
- Height: 1.89 m (6 ft 2 in)
- Position: Centre-back

Team information
- Current team: Tampines Rovers
- Number: 71

Youth career
- 2012–2013: National Football Academy
- 2013: Hércules
- 2014: Barnechea
- 2014–2015: Universidad Católica

Senior career*
Years	Team	Apps	(Gls)
2015	Universidad Católica	1	(0)
2015	Young Lions	9	(2)
2016–2017	Home United	34	(7)
2018	Young Lions	18	(2)
2019–2024	BG Pathum United	125	(11)
2024–2026	Port	35	(0)
2026–	Tampines Rovers	8	(0)

International career^{‡}
2015–2019	Singapore U22	7	(1)
2014–2019	Singapore U23	32	(8)
2016–	Singapore	58	(2)
Medal record
Men's football
Representing Singapore
Merlion Cup
Winner	2019 Singapore
- * Club domestic league appearances and goals as of 04:30, 13 July 2026 (UTC) ‡ National team caps and goals as of 14:45, 31 May 2026 (UTC)

Irfan bin Fandi Ahmad (born 13 August 1997), better known as Irfan Fandi or just Irfan, is a Singaporean professional footballer who plays as a centre-back for Singapore Premier League club Tampines Rovers and the Singapore national team. Earlier in his career, he played as a striker and a winger before switching to the centre-back position. In 2013, he was listed as one of Goal.com's Top 20 Southeast Asian Rising Stars. In 2014, Irfan was also named as one of the top 40 best young talents in world football on The Guardian.

Irfan began his footballing career by going through the youth system at the National Football Academy (NFA), with subsequent stints and trials at various clubs before debuting as a professional at the age of 18 at top tier Chilean Primera División side Universidad Católica in 2015. Although Irfan was offered a two-year contract by the club, he rejected it to return to Singapore. For the next three years, Irfan played for local clubs the Young Lions and Home United. (Note: Home United has been known as the Lion City Sailors since 2019.) Around this time, he went on trials with Dutch Eredivisie side Groningen and Portuguese Primeira Liga side Braga, rejecting a contract offer from the latter.

In 2018, Irfan signed for Thailand's BG Pathum United prior to the 2019 Thai League 2 season, where he was instrumental to the club's immediate promotion back to the Thai League 1 and soon after when the club become the Champions of Thailand during the 2021–22 Thai League 1 season – becoming the first Singaporean to win Thailand's top tier league trophy. During their title winning season, Irfan led BG Pathum's defence with the club only losing a single game the entire season, while conceding just 11 goals in 24 matches and keeping 15 clean sheets.

Irfan made his senior international debut for Singapore in 2016, with a single goal as a centre-back coming against Turkmenistan in 2017, and earning 38 caps as of 2022. He has represented his country at various international tournaments, including the 2018 and the 2020 AFF Championships. Irfan also notably became the first Singaporean in history to win two matches against English teams in 2025, defeating Manchester United while playing for the ASEAN All-Stars team and later winning the 2025 Piala Presiden with Port against Oxford United.

== Early life and family ==
Irfan was born on 13 August 1997 in Singapore. Irfan is the eldest son of Singaporean footballing legend Fandi Ahmad and South African former model Wendy Jacobs.

He has three younger brothers: Ikhsan, who plays for Japanese J3 League club Thespa Gunma; Ilhan, who plays for Singapore Premier League club Lion City Sailors.; and Iryan, who plays for Young Lions. He also has a younger sister Iman, who is a singer, actress and model.

His grandfather, Ahmad Wartam, was an ex-national goalkeeper. Hafiz Abu Sujad and the national team's physiotherapist Nurhafizah are the cousins of his father Fandi Ahmad.

== Club career ==
=== Youth ===
Irfan started his career by going through the youth system of the National Football Academy (NFA).

In March 2013, Irfan had an opportunity to secure his first overseas stint, which was supposed to be with Hércules, a second-tier Spanish professional club. However, he failed to secure a contract with the club due to visa issues. He later joined Chilean side Barnechea, signing a two-year contract with the Chilean Primera División club.

=== Universidad Católica ===
Irfan then joined Chilean Primera División club Universidad Católica in 2014 and made his first team debut the following year, appearing from the bench for the club's senior team in the 81st minute, when Universidad Católica were leading 4–0 against San Luis de Quillota becoming the first Singaporean to play in the Chilean top flight league. However, Irfan later rejected a two-year contract from the club in order to return to Singapore and fulfil his National Service obligations.

=== Young Lions ===
On 5 March 2015, it was announced that Irfan would join S.League side Young Lions for the 2015 S.League season on a six-month contract. On the same day, he was immediately named in the starting line-up to face Tampines Rovers, due to an injury suffered by Shakir Hamzah.

=== Home United ===
In January 2016, it was announced that Irfan signed a two-year contract for Home United for the upcoming 2016 S.League season along with his brother, Ikhsan. He scored a brace against Balestier Khalsa in only his second start of the season after being away for most of the season due to National Service commitments.

On 14 March 2017, Puma was revealed to have signed Irfan on a two-year sponsorship deal. Irfan's former Chilean club, Universidad Católica was also reportedly interested in re-signing him following the completion of his national service.

Irfan scored his first goal in the 2017 S.League season in a 0–2 victory over Hougang United, later following up with his first at the continental level, scoring in the 24th minute against Myanmar side Yadanarbon in the 2017 AFC Cup which give his side a 3–0 lead in an eventual 4–1 win. The win saw Home United become the first side to advance to the zonal semi-finals. Irfan was later nominated for the S.League's 'Young Player of the Season' award. His performances also drew the attention of Thailand's BG Pathum United, which he would eventually sign for, and was also offered a trial with English side Leeds United in December 2017.

=== Return to Young Lions ===
In January 2018, Irfan returned to join Young Lions after his national service for the inaugural 2018 Singapore Premier League season.

==== Trials in Europe ====
In February 2018, Irfan, together with his brother Ikhsan, went on trials at Dutch Eredivisie club Groningen which his father Fandi Ahmad used to play for. He also went on another trial with Portuguese top-tier side, Braga, and was later offered a two-year deal, with the club retaining the option to extend the contract by two additional years. Irfan rejected the offer, citing that he felt lonely and homesick during his brief stint with the club. He also added that the clause of having to fork out a hefty compensation of €15 million should he decide to leave the club during the contract was one of the other reasons that he did not accept it. Irfan eventually rejoined the Young Lions and ended the season with 22 appearances with 3 goals.

=== BG Pathum United ===
On 11 November 2018, it was confirmed that Irfan would join BG Pathum United to fill up the club's ASEAN slot for the 2019 Thai League 2 season. Irfan agreed to join the Thai side despite their relegation as they had been interested in signing him for two years. On 7 April 2019, he scored his first goal for the club which ended up to be a brace during a league match against Samut Sakhon City in a 6–1 victory. In a reverse league fixtures against the same opponent on 10 August 2019, Irfan scored another brace in a 3–0 away win. In Irfan first season, he won the Thai League 2 title which helped the club to secure promotion back to the Thai League 1.

==== Jeonbuk Hyundai Motors interest ====
In December 2021, South Korea's reigning champions Jeonbuk Hyundai is interested in Irfan in which BG Pathum and Jeonbuk met in the AFC Champions League in September 2021, with Irfan putting up a solid performance in the Thai side's defence. According to The Straits Times, a Jeonbuk agent had asked for Irfan's number a day after the match. Following Jeonbuk's interest, BG Pathum's chairman, Kawin Bhirombhakdi requested no less than 30 million baht (S$1.23 million) for Irfan's transfer fee but Irfan told Straits Times that he respected his club's decision, having been able to grow on and off the pitch at the club.

==== Thai League 1 ====
On 15 February 2020, Irfan was sent off in the first half of his first top-flight game in Thailand, when BG Pathum trailed Muangthong United 1–0. The club eventually won the game 2–1.

The following season after winning the Thai League 2 title, Irfan became the first Singaporean to win the Thai League 1 title after his club swooped to the title having garnered an unassailable 19-point cushion over second-placed rivals Buriram United, with six games left. Irfan was key to their triumph with the defence having only conceded just 11 goals in 24 matches, while keeping 15 clean sheets.

Irfan won his fourth silverware in the form of the 2022 Thailand Champions Cup with BG Pathum in a 3–2 win over Buriram United. He helped the team to finished as group leaders in the 2022 AFC Champions League which see the club qualified to the Round of 16 in which Irfan managed to keep a clean sheet in the entire game in a 4–0 win against Hong Kong club, Kitchee. The club than progressed to the quarter-finals for the first time in the history of the tournament in which they lost against eventual cup winners, Urawa Red Diamonds where Irfan played the full 90’ minute becoming the first Singaporean alongside his brother Ikhsan, to reach the AFC Champions League quarter-finals.

On 22 August 2023, Irfan played the entire 90' minute match in the 2023–24 AFC Champions League qualifying play-offs against Shanghai Port at the Pudong Football Stadium in which BG Pathum won the game 3–2 thus qualifying straight to the group stage. On 10 February 2024, Irfan returned to action after a 6 months injury that forced him out since late August 2023 where he scored the equaliser in the 83rd minute of the game in a 1–1 draw against PT Prachuap. On 16 June 2024, Irfan won his fifth trophy at the club which is the 2023–24 Thai League Cup.

=== Port ===
After five seasons at BG Pathum United making 124 appearances and scoring 10 goals with the club, Irfan signed with another Thai League 1 club Port on 17 June 2024 joining Indonesian player Asnawi Mangkualam as the club second ASEAN import. He make his debut in a league match against Rayong on 10 August in a 3–1 away win. During the 2024–25 AFC Champions League Two away fixture against Indonesian club Persib Bandung, Irfan form a solid partnership with Ghanaian player Isaac Honny which put the team to win a narrow 1–0 win against Persib Bandung.

As Port was invited by Football Association of Indonesia for the 2025 Piala Presiden in July 2025, Irfan played against both Persib Bandung and Dewa United in the group stage, Irfan scored his first goal for the club with 90+5’ stoppage time diving header which gave his team a 2–1 win against Dewa United on 10 July 2025 sending his team to the final facing off against EFL Championship side Oxford United where surprisingly, Port manage to win 2–1 thus making Irfan the first Singaporean to win two matches against an English team.

=== Tampines Rovers ===
On 14 September 2026, Irfan returned to the Singapore Premier League after 8 years having signed with Tampines Rovers. Irfan signed a short-term contract that runs till December 2026. He make his debut for the club on 11 October 2026 against Tanjong Pagar United in a 4–0 win.

== International career ==
=== Youth ===
Irfan was part of the Singapore U16 side in the 25th edition of the Lion City Cup held in 2013, impressing against Arsenal U15 and Eintracht Frankfurt U15. He made his Singapore U23 debut on 14 February 2015, scoring against the Japan U22s, and was selected by coach Aide Iskandar for the 2015 Southeast Asian Games.

=== Senior ===
In September 2016, Irfan was called up by national team coach V. Sundramoorthy for the friendlies against Malaysia and Hong Kong on 7 and 11 October respectively. He made his debut for the senior national team against Hong Kong at the Mongkok Stadium. He earned his second cap in a friendly against Afghanistan before securing his first start against Bahrain in Singapore's first third-round match of the 2019 AFC Asian Cup qualification, helping the Lions earn a 0-0 away draw.

Irfan was selected as part of the Singapore Selection squad for The Sultan of Selangor's Cup held on 6 May 2017. He also made his AFF Championship debut in the 2018 iteration on 9 November, with a 1–0 win over Indonesia.

Irfan received a call up to the national team for a friendly against Afghanistan and the 2022 FIFA World Cup qualification matches held in Riyadh against Palestine, Uzbekistan, and Saudi Arabia along with brothers, Ikhsan and Ilhan. This was the first time all three of the then-eligible Fandi brothers were called up.

On 25 December 2021, in the second leg of the 2020 AFF Championship semi-final match against Indonesia, Irfan was controversially sent off in the 67th minute after tackling down Irfan Jaya for allegedly denying a goalscoring opportunity.

On 26 March 2022, against Malaysia, Irfan played alongside his younger brothers Ikhsan and Ilhan. It was the first time that the three Fandi brothers played in the same match for the national team together. It was also the first time in Singapore's history to have three brothers playing for the national team. The Singapore team won 2–1 thanks to a brace from his younger brother Ikhsan.

On 27 December 2022 of matchday 3 in the 2022 AFF Championship group stage, he scored his 2nd goal for Singapore against Laos with a diving header.

=== Others ===
==== ASEAN All-Stars ====
Irfan was chosen as the sole representative for Singapore to represent ASEAN All-Stars in the Maybank Challenge Cup. Irfan played in the 1–0 win against Manchester United on 28 May 2025 at the Bukit Jalil National Stadium.

== Personal life ==
Irfan attended the Singapore Sports School at Woodlands.

Irfan, along with his brother Ilhan, served their National Service (NS) obligations for the Singapore Police Force (SPF) while Ikhsan served in the Singapore Armed Forces (SAF) from 2016 to 2018. During their stint, they had continued to play and train professional football under the Sportsmen Scheme by the Ministry of Defence (MINDEF) that gives special dispensation for local athletes with flexible timetables for sports events, including representing Singapore at international competitions.

== Career statistics ==
=== Club ===
As of match played 1 Jan 26

Appearances and goals by club, season and competition
Club	Season	League			National cup		League cup		Continental		Other		Total	
Club	Season	Division	Apps	Goals	Apps	Goals	Apps	Goals	Apps	Goals	Apps	Goals	Apps	Goals
Young Lions	2015	S.League	9	2	0	0	—		—		—		9	2
Home United	2016	S.League	8	2	0	0	—		—		—		8	2
Home United	2017	S.League	17	4	2	0	—		7 (Note: Appearances in the AFC Cup)	1	—		26	5
Home United	Total		25	6	2	0	—		7	1	0	0	34	7
Young Lions	2018	Singapore Premier League	18	2	0	0	—		—		—		18	2
BG Pathum United	2019	Thai League 2	27	4	1	0	4	2	—		—		32	6
BG Pathum United	2020–21	Thai League 1	19	1	0	0	0	0	—		—		19	1
BG Pathum United	2021–22	Thai League 1	25	1	3	0	0	0	1 (Note: Appearance(s) in AFC Champions League Elite)	0	1 (Note: Appearance(s) in Thailand Champions Cup)	0	30	1
BG Pathum United	2022–23	Thai League 1	12	1	3	0	3	1	6	0	1	0	25	2
BG Pathum United	2023–24	Thai League 1	14	1	1	0	2	0	2	0	—		19	1
BG Pathum United	Total		97	8	8	0	9	3	9	0	2	0	125	11
Port	2024–25	Thai League 1	15	0	0	0	1	0	3 (Note: Appearance(s) in AFC Champions League Two)	0	—		19	0
Port	2025–26	Thai League 1	5	0	0	0	1	0	0	0	—		6	0
Port	Total		21	0	0	0	2	0	3	0	2	0	26	0
Career total			168	18	10	0	11	3	19	1	2	0	210	22

=== International ===
As of match played 31 May 2026

Appearances and goals by national team and year
National team	Year	Apps	Goals
Singapore	2016	1	0
Singapore	2017	10	1
Singapore	2018	10	0
Singapore	2019	5	0
Singapore	2021	10	0
Singapore	2022	9	1
Singapore	2023	2	0
Singapore	2024	1	0
Singapore	2025	1	0
Singapore	2026	2	0
Total		58	2

=== International goals ===
Scores and results list Singapore's goal tally first.

No	Date	Venue	Opponent	Score	Result	Competition
1	10 October 2017	Köpetdag Stadium, Ashgabat, Turkmenistan	Turkmenistan	1–1	1–2	2019 AFC Asian Cup qualification
2	27 December 2022	New Laos National Stadium, Vientiane, Laos	Laos	1–0	2–0	2022 AFF Championship

=== International U23 goals ===
No	Date	Venue	Opponent	Result	Competition
1	21 February 2015	Jalan Besar Stadium, Singapore	Syria	1–2	U23 International Friendly
2	14 February 2015	Jalan Besar Stadium, Singapore	Japan	1–8	U23 International Friendly
3	31 March 2015	New Laos National Stadium, Laos	Mongolia	2–2	2016 AFC U-23 Championship qualification
4	31 March 2015	New Laos National Stadium, Laos	Mongolia	2–2	2016 AFC U-23 Championship qualification
5	23 May 2015	Jalan Besar Stadium, Singapore	Laos	5–1	U23 International Friendly
6	29 May 2015	Jalan Besar Stadium, Singapore	Timor-Leste	2–0	U23 International Friendly
7	20 June 2018	National Stadium, Singapore	Myanmar	0–2	Friendly
8	26 March 2019	MFF Football Centre, Mongolia	Mongolia	3–1	2020 AFC U-23 Championship qualification
9	5 December 2019	Rizal Memorial Stadium, Philippines	Brunei	7–0	2019 Southeast Asian Games

== Honours ==
BG Pathum United

- Thai League 1: 2020–21
- Thai League 2: 2019
- Thailand Champions Cup: 2021, 2022
- Thai League Cup: 2023–24

Port

- Thai League Cup: 2025–26
- Piala Presiden: 2025

Singapore U22

- Merlion Cup: 2019

ASEAN All-Stars

- Maybank Challenge Cup: 2025

Individual

- Thai League Dream ASEAN XI
