= Fandi Ahmad =

Singaporean footballer and coach (born 1962)

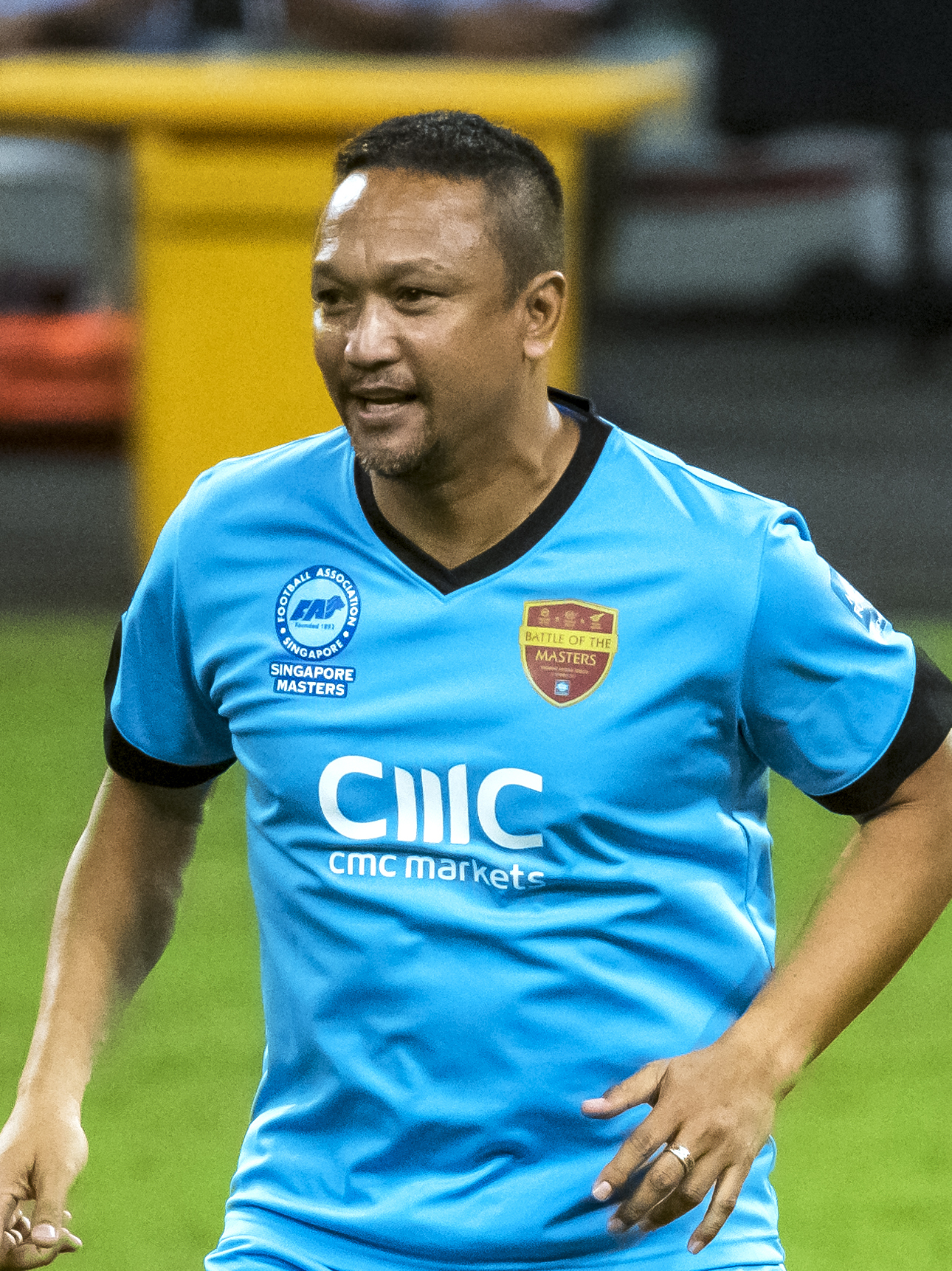
- Fandi playing in a charity match in 2017

Personal information
- Full name: Fandi bin Ahmad
- Date of birth: 29 May 1962 (age 64)
- Place of birth: Singapore
- Height: 1.76 m (5 ft 9 in)
- Positions: Striker; midfielder

Senior career*
Years	Team	Apps	(Gls)
1978–1982	Singapore FA	114	(66)
1982–1983	Niac Mitra	40	(10)
1983–1985	Groningen	36	(12)
1986–1989	Inter Lilliput FA	46	(20)
1990	OFI	0	(0)
1991–1992	Pahang FA	12	(8)
1993–1994	Singapore FA	34	(18)
1996	Geylang United	18	(6)
1997–1999	Singapore Armed Forces	60	(32)
Total		360	(182)

International career
1979–1997	Singapore	101	(55)

Managerial career
- 1999: Singapore (assistant)
- 2000–2003: Singapore Armed Forces
- 2003–2006: Singapore (assistant)
- 2005–2006: Young Lions
- 2006–2010: Pelita Jaya
- 2012: Johor FA
- 2013: Johor Darul Ta'zim
- 2014–2015: LionsXII
- 2017–2019: Young Lions
- 2018: Singapore (interim)
- 2019: Singapore U22
- 2022–2023: Sri Pahang (technical advisor)
- 2023–2025: Sri Pahang
- * Club domestic league appearances and goals

Fandi bin Ahmad PBM (born 29 May 1962) is a Singaporean professional football manager/head coach and former player. During his professional career, he played mainly as a striker, but also occasionally as a midfielder. Along with the Singapore FA, he also played for Malaysia Cup state sides Kuala Lumpur FA and Pahang FA, and won titles with all three, including two doubles in 1992 and 1994, as well as the Golden Boot in 1988. Fandi also played for Indonesia's Niac Mitra, Netherlands' Groningen as well as local Singaporean clubs Geylang United and SAFFC. (Note: A club representing the Singapore Armed Forces. Formerly known as SAFFC, they were renamed to Warriors F.C. in 2013.)

With the Singapore national team, Fandi earned 101 caps and scored 55 goals, a record he holds today, as well as winning three Southeast Asian Games (SEA Games) silver medals while being captain from 1993 to 1997. After his retirement, he began his managerial career in 2000 by helming his former playing club SAFFC, before moving on to Indonesia's Pelita Raya and Malaysia's Johor Darul Ta'zim, while also serving as the assistant national coach on numerous occasions and running his own Fandi Ahmad Academy.

Fandi has been described as a national legend for Singapore. (Note: Reliable sources have described Fandi as a "Singapore football legend", "Singapore's favourite footballing son", a "national football icon", "Singapore's most celebrated footballer", "the country's golden boy of football", "the most well known face of Singapore sport", "the best of his generation", "one of Singapore's greatest footballers ever" and "one of Asia's best players".) In 1995, he was awarded the Pingat Bakti Masyarakat (Public Service Medal) for his achievements, which included being the first Singaporean footballer to play in Europe, the first Singaporean millionaire sportsperson and the first Singaporean sportsperson to have a published biography.

He has five children with his wife, South African model Wendy Jacobs, and his father is Ahmad Wartam, a former national goalkeeper. Fandi was ranked sixth in a list of Singapore's 50 Greatest Athletes of the Century by The Straits Times in 1999. His children, most notably Ikhsan, Ilhan, Iryan, and Irfan, are also professional footballers.

== Early life ==
As a young child, Fandi was obsessed with football and spent much of his time kicking a ball. His family lived in a two-room public housing flat in Hougang. His family was working class; Fandi had to sell nasi lemak to help support the family. Fandi's father, Ahmad Wartam, was then a goalkeeper for the national team in the 1960s. Fandi started playing as a goalkeeper, but switched to a midfield position under the advice of his teacher when he studied at Yio Chu Kang Primary.

When he was 12, his parents divorced, after which he lived in a kampong at Jalan Eunos with his father and paternal grandparents. At Serangoon Garden Secondary School, Fandi played for the school football team, but neglected his studies and was held back a year. He then transferred to the Singapore Vocational Institute and obtained a National Trade Certificate 3. He played for Kaki Bukit SC in the amateur National Football League, where he was spotted by Singapore FA coach Sebastian Yap.

By the time he was 15, Fandi had become a regular for the Singapore national youth football team. In 1977, Fandi was a member of the Singapore under-17 national team that won the Lion City Cup youth tournament. In 1978, he was a part of the team again and they retained the Lion City Cup. In August that year, Fandi was called up for a senior national team squad for a training tour in Russia, becoming the youngest footballer to represent Singapore.

== Club career ==
=== Singapore FA (1979–1983) ===
Fandi joined Singapore FA in 1979 and became a regular midfield player, scoring four goals in his first Malaysia Cup season. The retirement of Arshad Khamis and Dollah Kassim prompted Jita Singh, the new Singapore FA coach, to play Fandi as a striker. During the 1980 Malaysia Cup season, Fandi scored eight goals, including the winning goal in the final against Selangor FA. He enlisted for National Service in September 1980 and was given light duties, such as collecting the camp garbage, so he could continue playing for Singapore FA. In 1981, Fandi won the FAS Footballer of the Year award for helping Singapore FA reach the Malaysia Cup final. The following year, Singapore FA did not play in the Malaysia Cup for political reasons, and Fandi underwent a shoulder operation; he could not play football for six weeks and was discharged early from the National Service.

Selangor FA invited Fandi to play for them against Argentine club Boca Juniors, which featured Diego Maradona, in a friendly game, in which Fandi scored the only goal for Selangor FA; the score was 2–1. Fandi was just 19 while serving National Service at the time and after the match, Boca's chief coach Vladislao Cap said he was keen on signing the Singaporean, whom he described as "a superb striker who can fit into any team".

Fandi received offers from several Malaysia Cup teams: Indonesian side Niac Mitra, Swiss club Young Boys and Dutch side Ajax. It was Ajax he eventually chose, but after a three-week trial, Fandi rejected Ajax's three-year deal and with it, the opportunity to work with and be honed by the legendary Johan Cruyff and play up front with the likes of a young Marco van Basten and Jan Molby, whom he had been scouted along with. Fandi ended up signing a one-year contract with Niac Mitra instead, earning S$75,000 annually, choosing to ply his trade nearer to home. Fandi was joined by compatriot David Lee in Niac Mitra. Fandi helped Niac Mitra successfully defend their Galatama League title and was the third-highest scorer with 13 goals. In a friendly match between Niac Mitra and Arsenal, Fandi scored a goal in a 2–0 victory; however, he left Niac Mitra due to a sudden Galatama League ban on foreign players.

=== Overseas clubs (1983–1992) ===
In 1983, Fandi moved to the Netherlands and signed a two-year contract with Groningen. A thigh injury acquired in a friendly match kept him off the field for ten weeks, but in his first Eredivisie game he scored twice in a 2–0 victory over Go Ahead Eagles. On 19 October 1983, Fandi played in the first leg of a UEFA Cup second-round match against Italian side Internazionale, and scored the second goal in a 2–0 win (the first being from Erwin Koeman), though in the second leg Groningen were defeated 1–5. The Inter team boasted a couple of legendary names such as Giuseppe Baresi, Giuseppe Bergomi, Alessandro Altobelli, Evaristo Beccalossi, Riccardo Ferri, Fulvio Collovati and goalkeeper, Walter Zenga. The Groningen fans voted Fandi the most popular player and the most skilful player that season; he scored 10 goals in 29 games to help the Dutch club rise from ninth to fifth place in the Eredivisie. As an April Fools' Day joke, The Straits Times published a front-page story claiming that Manchester United had signed on Fandi. His second season was marred by a recurrence of his thigh injury and a dispute with his coach. He played only two full games that season and Groningen did not offer him a new contract. During his time in the Netherlands, Fandi scored 11 league goals in 36 league games for Groningen.

The next club that Fandi played for was Malaysia Cup side Kuala Lumpur FA, which in 1987 won its first Malaysia Cup title. It was Malaysia Cup champion again the following season; Fandi won the Golden Boot, having scored 21 goals. In his third season at Kuala Lumpur FA, they won a third consecutive Malaysia Cup. Fandi then signed a two-year contract with Greek club OFI in 1990. However, problems with his International Transfer Certificate prevented him from playing for OFI, so he left Greece after two months. Fandi then joined Pahang FA, where he reverted to playing mainly in midfield due to his advancing age. Fandi missed several months of games because of heel and thigh injuries, and scored three goals to help Pahang FA win the Malaysia Cup and Malaysian League Double in 1992. That year, he became the first Singaporean sportsperson to have career earnings exceeding a million Singapore dollars (not adjusted for inflation).

=== National clubs (1993–1999) ===
Fandi rejoined Singapore FA after it was relegated to the second tier of the Malaysian League. Singapore FA was promoted and reached the Malaysia Cup final in 1993, and finished the 1994 season as Malaysia Cup and Malaysian League champions. Fandi served as a captain and played in 39 of Singapore FA's 41 games in the double-winning season, subsequently becoming the top scorer with 26 goals and being voted Player of the Season; he was also awarded a state medal, the Pingat Bakti Masyarakat (Public Service Medal).

In its inaugural S.League season in 1996, Fandi joined and captained Geylang United where he was the joint top scorer with 11 goals, including the equaliser that confirmed Geylang as league champions. The Asian Football Confederation declared him the Player of the Month of June 1996. Geylang was given special dispensation to pay Fandi thrice the S.League salary cap.

Fandi's playing career concluded with three seasons at SAFFC, during which they won two S.League titles and two Singapore Cups. Because of injuries, Fandi was limited to mainly short substitute appearances, but he continued to score crucial goals, notably two against Cambodian side Royal Dolphins in the Asian Club Championship, until his retirement in 1999.

== International career ==
From 1979 to 1997, Fandi made 101 appearances for the Singapore national football team, (Note: Football Association of Singapore records from this period were not accepted by FIFA, so Fandi is not listed in the FIFA Century Club.) scored 55 goals and earned a place in the Asian Football Confederation Hall of Fame. He started as captain of the national youth team that won the Lion City Cup in 1976 and 1977, then joined the senior national team on a tour of Russia, where he played in two friendly games and scored two goals in the second. His first senior cap came at 17 years, 3 months and 23 days, making him Singapore's youngest-ever full international, until his record was broken by Hariss Harun in 2007. However, in his first international competition, the 1979 SEA Games, Fandi did not score in four matches. He scored against India and North Korea in the Olympic Games qualifiers, but did not score in three FIFA World Cup qualifying matches. In the 1981 Ovaltine Cup, Fandi scored all Singapore goals in the 3–2 aggregate victory over Malaysia. Fandi scored a goal in a 1–2 loss to Thailand in the 1981 King's Cup and a hat-trick against the Philippines at the 1981 SEA Games. In 1992, Fandi scored twice against Nepal and once against Thailand in the King's Cup, then scored when Singapore beat Malaysia 3–1 in the Ovaltine Cup.

The following year, Fandi helped Singapore win the first of three SEA Games silver medals, with two goals in a 3–0 group stage win over Brunei and two against Malaysia in the semi-final. Despite suffering an ankle injury in the 1–2 final defeat by Thailand, he played in the 1983 Merlion Cup, and scored in a 1–0 semi-final win against of China. The second SEA Games silver medal came in 1985, when Fandi scored against Malaysia and the Philippines in the group stage, then two goals against Brunei in the semi-final. At the 1989 SEA Games, Fandi scored in the 4–0 victory over Myanmar that took Singapore past the group stages, the last-minute winner in the semi-final against defending champions Indonesia and Singapore's single goal in the 1–3 final defeat by Malaysia. This completed the hat-trick of silver medals, though in 2007, he said that "not winning the SEA Games gold medal" was among "his biggest regrets". Fandi also played at the 1990 Asian Games and scored in the 6–1 win against Pakistan.

During the 1991 SEA Games, Fandi scored both Singapore goals against Myanmar in the group stage, but was substituted in the semi-final match, after Indonesian fullback Herry Setyawan elbowed him in the eye. That match ended goalless and the Lions lost on penalties. Fandi also missed Singapore's failed attempt to qualify for the 1992 Asian Cup, having sustained a heel injury. At the 1993 SEA Games, captain Fandi scored a hat-trick in the 7–0 defeat of the Philippines, followed by the second Singapore goal in the 3–3 semi-final draw with Myanmar, and scored once in the 3–1 win over Indonesia that secured a bronze medal for Singapore. Fandi also played in the inaugural Tiger Cup, and scored an equaliser against Malaysia, a goal against Brunei and two against the Philippines. 1997 was a disappointing year for Fandi, who failed to score in the Dunhill Cup and the World Cup qualifiers. After the 1997 SEA Games, where his goal in the semi-final could not prevent a 1–2 defeat to Indonesia, Fandi retired from international football.

== Managerial career ==
After his retirement from playing, Fandi worked as a coach. He started as the assistant to Singapore's national coach, Vincent Subramaniam, for the 1999 SEA Games, where Singapore finished fourth. In 2011, he founded the Fandi Ahmad Academy, which organises training programmes and overseas opportunities for talented young Singaporean footballers. Fandi is one of seven Singaporean coaches with a professional AFC coaching diploma and is widely considered a likely future coach of the Singapore national football team.

=== 2000–2015 ===
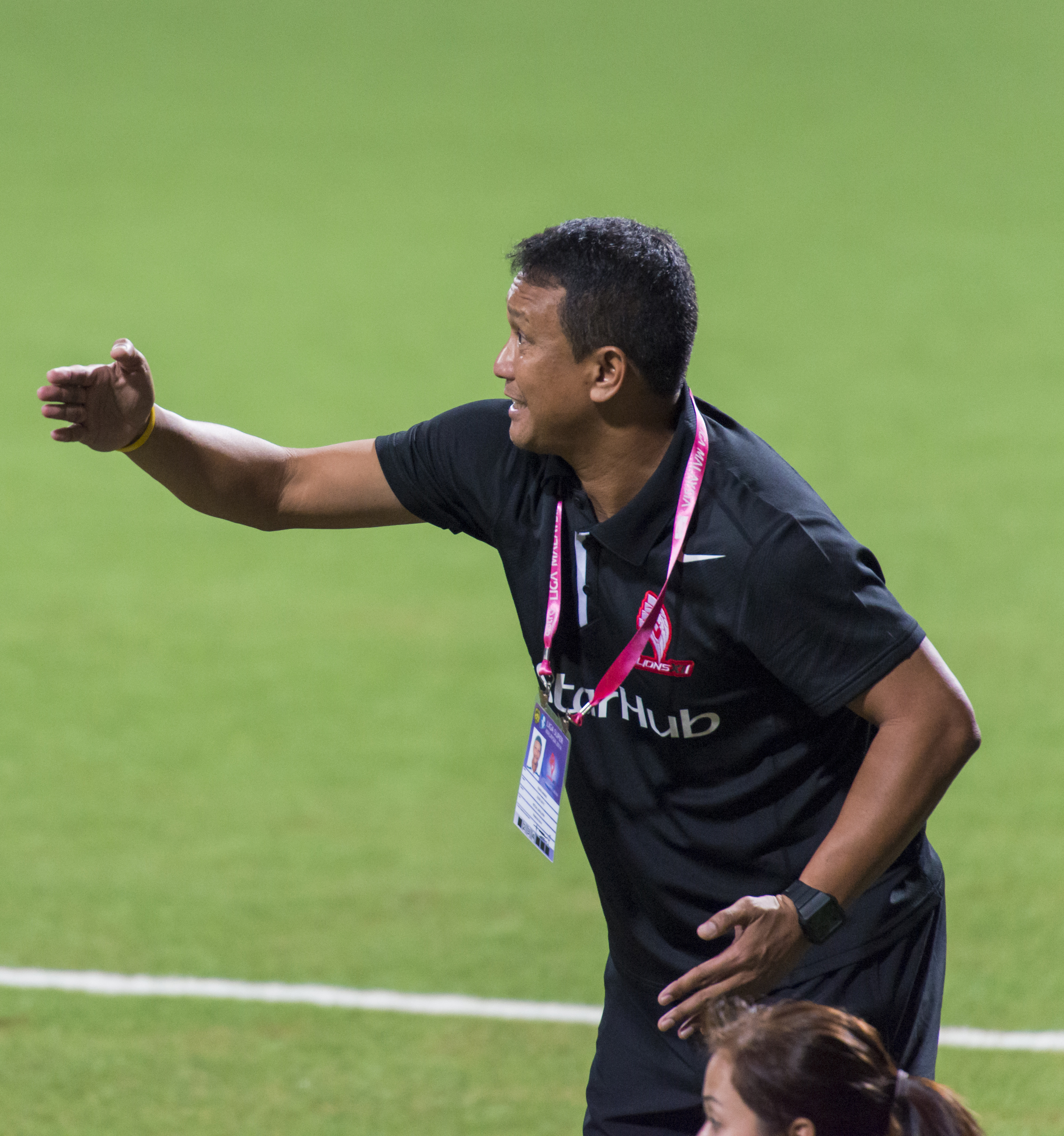
Fandi in 2014 as head coach of LionsXII

In 2000, Fandi became coach of SAFFC and guided them to the 2000 S.League title, and he won the S.League Coach of the Year Award. Under Fandi, SAFFC ended the 2001 season without winning a trophy but the following year, they were the 2002 S.League champions by a 20-point margin. Fandi simultaneously served as assistant national coach, helping Singapore win the Tiger Cup in 2005. In 2005, Fandi became the coach of Young Lions, which rose from the bottom of the S.League in 2003 to two third-place finishes in 2004 and 2006, which was their highest league placing in the club's history. From November 2006 to March 2010, Fandi managed Indonesian side Pelita Raya, where he adopted a youth policy that helped them win promotion from the second division, then guided the club to two mid-table finishes in the Indonesia Super League.

On 3 February 2012, the owner of Malaysian Super League side Johor Darul Ta'zim (JDT), the Crown Prince of Johor, Tunku Ismail Idris, approached Fandi, after the club's first year of rebranding the whole organisation structure and its footballing activities, to become the club's manager, a role which he accepted. Fandi reportedly earned $S30,000 a month. In his first season, he guided JDT all the way to the 2013 Malaysia FA Cup Final but lost 1–0 to Kelantan FA. Johor finished third in the 2013 Malaysia Super League behind LionsXII and Selangor FA. The side also paraded ex-Spanish international striker Dani Güiza, who won the Euro 2008; former SS Lazio player Simone del Nero; and a host of Malaysian internationals, including Malaysia captain Safiq Rahim and star player Safee Sali, Norshahrul Idlan Talaha, and the twins Aidil Zafuan and Zaquan Adha. On 30 July 2013, he was relieved of his duties. On 7 December 2013, he became head coach of the Singapore LionsXII, with Nazri Nasir as his assistant. On 23 May 2015, he led LionsXII to clinch the 2015 Malaysia FA Cup, their first trophy of the season.

=== 2016–present ===
Fandi was appointed as the head coach of Young Lions for the newly revamped 2018 Singapore Premier League season, replacing Richard Tardy. In May 2018, he was appointed as the interim head coach of the Singapore national football team until the end of the 2018 AFF Championship. Fandi's contract with the Football Association of Singapore (FAS) was extended in November 2019, with him in a new role as head of elite youth. He aimed, together with technical director Joseph Palatsides, to enhance the pathways and structure for the development of youth players for the national teams. After leading the Singapore under-22 at the 2019 SEA Games, Fandi's Young Lions and the under-22s were taken over by Nazri Nasir in 2020. Fandi was also a part of the national team's coach Tatsuma Yoshida's backroom staff.

On 21 July 2022, Fandi returned to Sri Pahang as a technical adviser. The appointment came three weeks after he left the Football Association of Singapore (FAS) following a seven-year stint. His contract as head of elite youth ended on 30 June 2022. It was reported in May 2022 that Fandi had several options from club sides in the region which he had turned down, including offers from sides in Indonesia. He was also linked to Malaysian teams due to his vast connections across the Causeway, such as his good relationship with Sri Pahang president, Tengku Abdul Rahman Sultan Ahmad Shah.

In January 2023, Fandi took over as Sri Pahang coach from Malaysian legend Dollah Salleh who had taken temporary charge after the resignation of Frenchman Christophe Gamel the previous season. This would be Fandi's second stint as head coach of a Malaysia Super League team. His team started off into the season well after 11 games with 7 wins, 4 draws, and 0 lost before losing the undefeated streak to Johor Darul Ta'zim 2–0. On 9 June 2023, when all hope seemed lost with the score favouring to Negeri Sembilan 1–3 in the final 10 minutes of the match, Fandi's team bounced back unexpectedly to win the match with the score being 4–3 at full time.

Fandi brought hopes to Sri Pahang during the 2024–25 Malaysia Cup when he guided the team to defeat Selangor 3–2 on aggregate in the round of 16, defeated Perak 4–3 on aggregate in the quarter-finals and went on to defeat Sabah 3–2 on aggregate in the semi-finals which saw the team advance to the 2025 Malaysia Cup final, where it was Sri Pahang's first final since 2018. In 2025, Sri Pahang was dissolved.

== Personal life ==
Fandi is a Muslim, avoids scandals, does not smoke or drink, and has been described as humble, filial, and compassionate. He married South African model Wendy Jacobs in 1996 and the couple have five children, namely sons Irfan, Ikhsan, Ilhan, Iryan, and a daughter Iman; the four sons are footballers. The eldest three (Irfan, Ikhsan, and Ilhan) play for the Singapore national team. Fandi is also a cousin of Hafiz Abu Sujad and the national team's physiotherapist Nurhafizah. He is the first Singaporean sportsperson to be the subject of a written biography, which was released in 1993 and called The Fandi Ahmad Story. It sold 17,000 copies in two months and was also translated into Malay.

In 2025, Fandi was honoured with a musical about him by the Institute of Technical Education (ITE). ITE's ninth musical, he was portrayed by ITE student Mohammed Irfan bin Mohammed Rizal.

=== Endorsements ===
Products Fandi has endorsed include Lotto sportswear, Royal Sporting House sportswear, Uncle Tobys cereal, Carnation milk, and energy drink Isomax. In 1996, he released an album of English and Malay songs and produced Meniti Pelangi, a television programme about disadvantaged Malay Singaporeans. Three years later, he opened a restaurant and a car dealership, but both closed down within two years. He has also served as an ambassador for national anti-smoking and anti-drug campaigns, raised funds for victims of the 2004 Indonesian tsunami and participated in a Northeast Community Development Council initiative to organise community service programmes. In 2026, he was appointed as Lenovo Singapore's ambassador and began a year-long collaboration with ITE.

== International career statistics ==
International goals (Note: International goals recognised by the Football Association of Singapore and the Asian Football Confederation.)
No	Date	Venue	Opponent	Result	Competition
1	26 February 1980	Singapore	India	1–0	1980 Olympic Games qualification
2	4 March 1980	Singapore	North Korea	3–1	1980 Olympic Games qualification
3	5 April 1981	Singapore	Malaysia	1–1	1981 Ovaltine Cup
4	19 April 1981	Kuala Lumpur, Malaysia	Malaysia	2–1	1981 Ovaltine Cup replay
5	19 April 1981	Kuala Lumpur, Malaysia	Malaysia	2–1	1981 Ovaltine Cup replay
6	9 November 1981	Bangkok, Thailand	Thailand	1–2	1981 King's Cup
7	9 December 1981	Manila, Philippines	Philippines	4–0	1981 Southeast Asian Games
8	9 December 1981	Manila, Philippines	Philippines	4–0	1981 Southeast Asian Games
9	9 December 1981	Manila, Philippines	Philippines	4–0	1981 Southeast Asian Games
10	7 January 1982	Singapore	Bahrain	2–0	Friendly
11	5 May 1982	Bangkok, Thailand	Nepal	2–0	1982 King's Cup
12	5 May 1982	Bangkok, Thailand	Nepal	2–0	1982 King's Cup
13	15 May 1982	Bangkok, Thailand	Thailand	2–2	1982 King's Cup
14	15 May 1982	Bangkok, Thailand	Thailand	2–2	1982 King's Cup
15	8 August 1982	Penang, Malaysia	India	3–0	1982 Merdeka Tournament
16	10 November 1982	Singapore	Malaysia	3–1	1982 Ovaltine Cup
17	28 May 1983	Singapore	Malaysia	2–1	1983 Southeast Asian Games
18	1 June 1983	Singapore	Philippines	5–0	1983 Southeast Asian Games
19	4 June 1983	Singapore	Brunei	4–0	1983 Southeast Asian Games
20	4 June 1983	Singapore	Brunei	4–0	1983 Southeast Asian Games
21	14 December 1983	Singapore	China	1–0	1983 Merlion Cup
22	13 December 1985	Bangkok, Thailand	Brunei	3–0	1985 Southeast Asian Games
23	13 December 1985	Bangkok, Thailand	Brunei	3–0	1985 Southeast Asian Games
24	14 December 1985	Bangkok, Thailand	Malaysia	2–2	1985 Southeast Asian Games
25	14 December 1985	Bangkok, Thailand	Malaysia	2–2	1985 Southeast Asian Games
26	4 April 1987	Singapore	Indonesia	2–0	1988 Olympic Games qualification
27	26 April 1987	Jakarta, Indonesia	Indonesia	1–2	1988 Olympic Games qualification
28	26 August 1989	Kuala Lumpur, Malaysia	Myanmar	4–0	1989 Southeast Asian Games
29	28 August 1989	Kuala Lumpur, Malaysia	Indonesia	1–0	1989 Southeast Asian Games
30	31 August 1989	Kuala Lumpur, Malaysia	Myanmar	1–3	1989 Southeast Asian Games
31	27 September 1990	Beijing, China	Pakistan	6–1	1990 Asian Games
32	29 November 1991	Manila, Philippines	Myanmar	2–1	1991 Southeast Asian Games
33	29 November 1991	Manila, Philippines	Myanmar	2–1	1991 Southeast Asian Games
34	25 November 1992	Yangon, Myanmar	Myanmar	1–0	Friendly
35	8 December 1992	Singapore	Malaysia	3–0	1992 Merlion Cup
36	13 April 1993	Doha, Qatar	Vietnam	3–2	1994 FIFA World Cup qualification
37	16 April 1993	Doha, Qatar	Qatar	1–4	1994 FIFA World Cup qualification
38	30 April 1993	Singapore	Qatar	1–0	1994 FIFA World Cup qualification
39	2 May 1993	Singapore	Indonesia	2–1	1994 FIFA World Cup qualification
40	9 June 1993	Singapore	Philippines	7–0	1994 FIFA World Cup qualification
41	9 June 1993	Singapore	Philippines	7–0	1994 FIFA World Cup qualification
42	9 June 1993	Singapore	Philippines	7–0	1994 FIFA World Cup qualification
43	17 June 1993	Singapore	Myanmar	3–3	1993 Southeast Asian Games
44	19 June 1993	Singapore	Indonesia	3–1	1993 Southeast Asian Games
45	17 July 1995	Singapore	Myanmar	3–3	1995 Tiger Beer Quadrangular
46	4 December 1995	Lamphun, Thailand	Brunei	2–2	1995 Southeast Asian Games
47	6 December 1995	Lamphun, Thailand	Myanmar	4–2	1995 Southeast Asian Games
48	6 December 1995	Lamphun, Thailand	Myanmar	4–2	1995 Southeast Asian Games
49	8 December 1995	Chiang Mai, Thailand	Philippines	4–0	1995 Southeast Asian Games
50	16 December 1995	Singapore	Myanmar	1–0	1995 Southeast Asian Games
51	1 September 1996	Singapore	Malaysia	1–1	1996 AFF Championship
52	4 September 1996	Singapore	Brunei	3–0	1996 AFF Championship
53	6 September 1996	Singapore	Philippines	3–0	1996 AFF Championship
54	6 September 1996	Singapore	Philippines	3–0	1996 AFF Championship
55	16 October 1997	Jakarta, Indonesia	Indonesia	1–2	1997 Southeast Asian Games

== Managerial statistics ==
As of 30 June 2025

Managerial record by team and tenure
Team	Nat.	From	To	Record					Ref.
Team	Nat.	From	To	G	W	D	L	Win %	Ref.
Young Lions	(Singapore)	1 January 2005	31 December 2006	34	17	8	9	50.00	
Pelita Jaya	(Indonesia)	1 January 2007	30 November 2009	34	14	7	13	41.18	
Johor Darul Ta'zim	(Malaysia)	3 February 2012	29 July 2013	62	25	17	20	40.32	
LionsXII	(Singapore)	7 December 2013	30 November 2015	67	30	13	24	44.78	
Young Lions	(Singapore)	14 December 2017	31 December 2019	48	11	10	27	22.92	
Singapore (caretaker)	(Singapore)	16 May 2018	16 December 2018	4	2	0	2	50.00	
Singapore U23	(Singapore)	1 July 2019	31 December 2019	5	1	1	3	20.00	
Sri Pahang	(Malaysia)	17 January 2023	30 June 2025	50	20	14	16	40.00	
Career Total				304	120	70	114	39.47	

== Honours ==
=== Player ===
Niac Mitra

- Galatama: 1982–83

Kuala Lumpur

- M-League: 1988
- Malaysia Cup: 1987, 1988, 1989

Pahang

- M-League: 1992
- Malaysia Cup: 1992

Singapore FA

- M-League: 1994
- Malaysia Cup: 1980, 1994

Geylang United

- S.League: 1996

Singapore Armed Forces

- S.League: 1997, 1998
- Singapore FA Cup: 1997
- Singapore Cup: 1999
- League Cup: 1997

Singapore

- Southeast Asian Games:

- Silver medal – 1983, 1985, 1989
- Bronze medal – 1991, 1993, 1995

Individual

- M-League Golden Boot: 1988

=== Manager ===
Singapore Armed Forces

- S.League: 2000, 2002

LionsXII

- Malaysia FA Cup: 2015

=== Individual ===
- S.League Coach of the Year: 2000

== See also ==
- List of men's footballers with 100 or more international caps
- List of top international men's football goalscorers by country

== Bibliography ==
- Yeo, Wilfred (1993). The Fandi Ahmad Story. Brit Aspen Publishing. ISBN 978-981-00-4843-3.

Sporting positions
Preceded by Terry Pathmanathan	Singapore national team captain 1993–1997	Succeeded by David Lee
