= Iryan Fandi =

Singaporean footballer

Personal information
- Full name: Iryan bin Fandi Ahmad
- Date of birth: 9 August 2006 (age 20)
- Place of birth: Singapore
- Height: 1.76 m (5 ft 9 in)
- Positions: Centre-back; left-back

Team information
- Current team: Young Lions
- Number: 17

Youth career
- 2021–2022: Lion City Sailors
- 2022–: Hougang United

Senior career*
Years	Team	Apps	(Gls)
2023–	Hougang United	2	(0)
2025–	→ Young Lions (loan)	3	(0)

International career^{‡}
2024–	Singapore U20	2	(0)
2025–	Singapore U23	0	(0)
- * Club domestic league appearances and goals as of 29 May 2025 ‡ National team caps and goals as of 18 March 2025

Iryan bin Fandi Ahmad (born 9 August 2006), better known as Iryan Fandi, is a Singaporean professional footballer who plays either as a centre-back or left-back for Singapore Premier League club Young Lions, on loan from Hougang United.

== Early life ==
Iryan has asthma which resulted in fainting spells while playing football when he was in Anglo-Chinese School (Junior). As such, he frequented the hospital and was dropped from the school team. Iryan then played rugby and competed for Anglo-Chinese School (Barker Road) up to when he was in Secondary 3. He tried to play football in secondary school for Anglo-Chinese School (Barker Road) but was rejected due to a lack of technique. Iryan then started working on his technique and started gymming. Eventually in Secondary 3, he was accepted into the school team.

His asthma is now under control and he is able to complete 90 minutes but still requires an inhaler pump before warm-ups.

== Club career ==
=== Lion City Sailors ===
Iryan joined Lion City Sailors academy before making a move to Hougang United at the start of 2022.

=== Hougang United ===
Iryan, a former Anglo-Chinese School (Barker Road) student was also a member of the Hougang United under-17 team. As a star performer in the Football Association of Singapore's Centre of Excellence Under-17 league, Iryan started in all 14 matches, kept 6 clean sheets and scored twice as Hougang finished second.

Iryan was named on the bench for the senior side for the first time on 19 February, against Albirex Niigata (S) in the 2023 Community Shield. The match ended in a 3–0 defeat which saw Hougang United finishing as a runner-up. He was named on the bench ahead of a Singapore Premier League match against Balestier Khalsa on 26 February 2023. At aged 16, Iryan made his senior professional and Singapore Premier League debut against Tampines Rovers on 16 April 2023. Iryan conceded a penalty in the 100th minute which resulted in a controversial 1–1 draw. Iryan is the fourth and last son of Fandi Ahmad to make his professional debut. He managed to appear for Hougang United in a pre season-friendly against fellow rivals Lion City Sailors in which they won 3-0 and he scored the opening goal.

==== Loan to Young Lions ====
While serving his national service, Iryan was loaned to Young Lions. Iryan was named on the match-day squad for the first time and made his debut as a substitute in a Singapore Cup tie against Tampines Rovers on 16 March 2025. He was brought on in the 75th minute to replace Andrew Aw.

== International career ==
Iryan was called up to the Singapore U19 squad for the March 2024 centralised training camp. Iryan was also called up to the Singapore U20 squad in August 2024 for the 2025 AFC U-20 Asian Cup qualification. He made his debut in a 3–0 lost against Qatar on 25 September 2024.

On 29 November 2025, Iryan was called up to the Singapore U22 side for the 2025 SEA Games.

== Style of play ==
Iryan plays as a left-footed centre-back, noted for his physicality, commitment, speed and, robustness. Cited by Robert Eziakor, head coach of the Hougang under-17 team, Iryan was compared to Singapore national team captain Hariss Harun with such physicality in the region. His father, Fandi Ahmad mentioned fearlessness was what sets Iryan apart from his brothers. Iryan is not afraid to get stuck in, fly into tackles and win headers.

== Personal life ==
Iryan is the youngest son of Singaporean footballer Fandi Ahmad and former South African model Wendy Jacobs.

His three older brothers are also footballers. The oldest brother Irfan plays for Port in Thailand. His two other older brothers, Ikhsan and Ilhan, play for Japanese J3 League club Thespa Gunma and Singapore Premier League club Lion City Sailors respectively. He has an older sister Iman.

His grandfather, Ahmad Wartam, was an ex-national goalkeeper. Hafiz Abu Sujad and the national team's physiotherapist Nurhafizah are the cousins of his father Fandi Ahmad.

== Career statistics ==
=== Club ===
As of match played 29 May 2025

Appearances and goals by club, season and competition
Club	Season	League			National cup		League cup		Continental		Other		Total	
Club	Season	Division	Apps	Goals	Apps	Goals	Apps	Goals	Apps	Goals	Apps	Goals	Apps	Goals
Hougang United	2023	Singapore Premier League	2	0	2	0	0	0	2 (Note: Appearance(s) in AFC Champions League Two)	0	—		6	0
Young Lions (loan)	2024–25	Singapore Premier League	3	0	1	0	0	0	—		—		4	0
Young Lions (loan)	2025–26	Singapore Premier League	2	0	0	0	0	0	—		—		2	0
Career total			7	0	3	0	0	0	2	0	0	0	12	0

== Honours ==
Hougang United

- Singapore Cup runner-up: 2023
- Singapore Community Shield runner-up: 2023
