= Ilhan Fandi =

Singaporean footballer

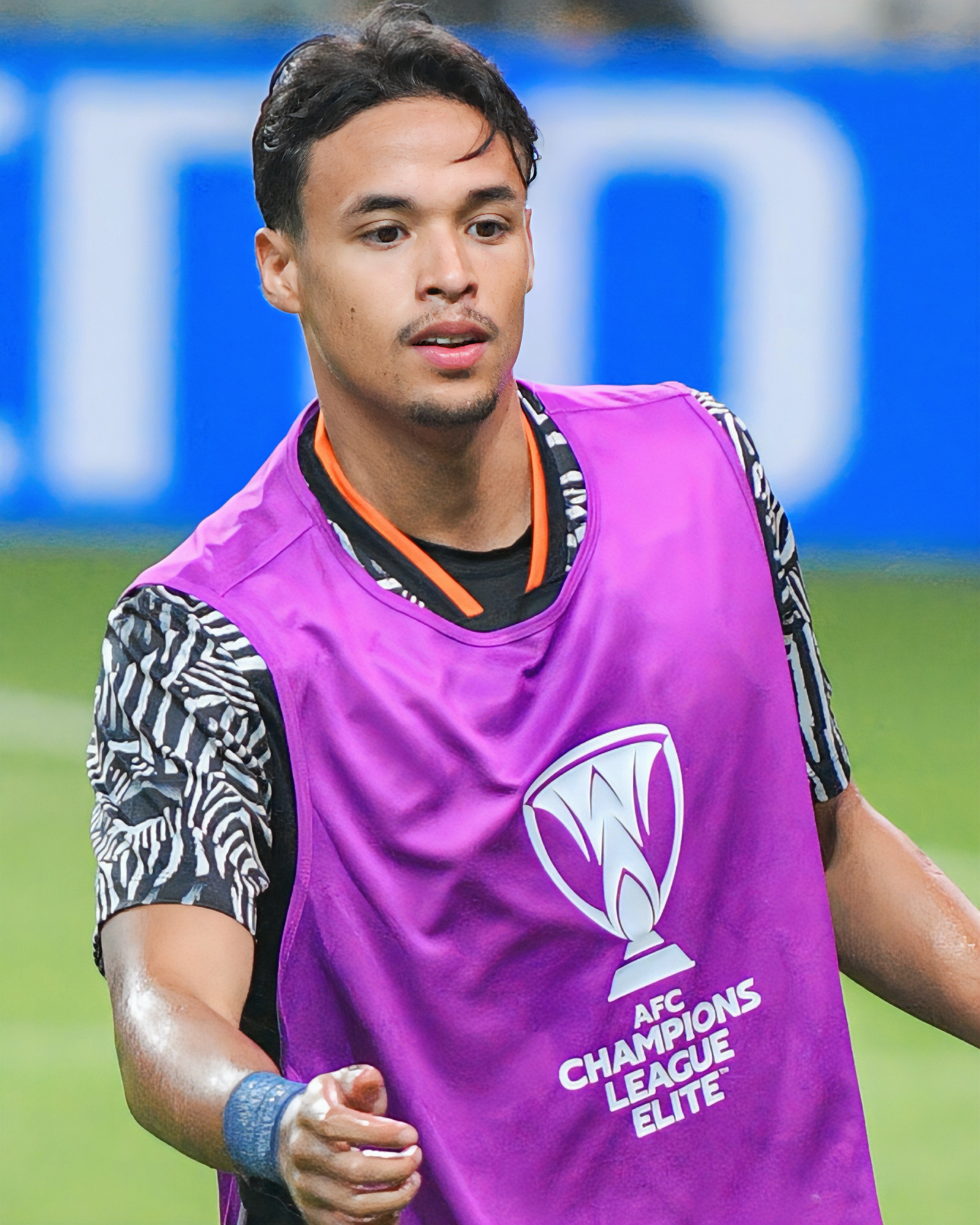
- Ilhan in 2025

Personal information
- Full name: Ilhan bin Fandi Ahmad
- Date of birth: 8 November 2002 (age 24)
- Place of birth: Singapore
- Height: 1.83 m (6 ft 0 in)
- Position: Forward

Team information
- Current team: Lion City Sailors
- Number: 17

Youth career
- i2i Football Academy

Senior career*
Years	Team	Apps	(Gls)
2019–2022	Young Lions	33	(13)
2022	Albirex Niigata (S)	18	(15)
2023–2024	Deinze U21	15	(8)
2023–2024	Deinze	1	(0)
2024–2026	BG Pathum United	16	(2)
2025–2026	→ Buriram United (loan)	6	(0)
2026–	Lion City Sailors	4	(1)

International career^{‡}
2017	Singapore U16	7	(0)
2022–	Singapore U23	2	(1)
2021–	Singapore	34	(10)
- * Club domestic league appearances and goals as of 25 October 2026 ‡ National team caps and goals as of 1 October 2026

Ilhan bin Fandi Ahmad (born 8 November 2002), better known as Ilhan Fandi, is a Singaporean professional footballer who plays as a forward for Singapore Premier League club Lion City Sailors and the Singapore national team.

== Club career ==
=== Early career ===
Ilhan embarked on his quest to become a professional footballer in Europe, by enrolling in an English school to study and train. The teenager left for England on 8 September 2017 to study at the Queen Ethelburga's College in York for the next two years.

Ilhan trained with the i2i Football Academy, which has links to English football club Leeds United. The academy also has partnerships with both York College and York St John University and will assist in linking up players with English professional and semi-professional clubs.

=== Young Lions ===
After his studies, Ilhan returned to Singapore to signed with the Singapore Premier League club, Young Lions in 2019. He made his debut in a 1–1 draw against DPMM on 7 August 2019. He became the third son of Fandi Ahmad to lace up his boots for the Young Lions – following in the footsteps of his brothers Irfan Fandi and Ikhsan Fandi. Ilhan made his first professional start in a league game at the age of 16 years and 331 days, where he scored his first goal in a 1–4 loss against Albirex Niigata Singapore on 15 August 2019.

Ilhan scored his third goal for the club in a heavy 4–1 defeat at the hands of Hougang United in the Young Lions' opening match of the 2020 Singapore Premier League season. As of April 2020, Ilhan has scored 3 goals in just 5 matches for the Young Lions.

Ilhan scored the first goal of the Young Lions' 2021 Singapore Premier League season, helping his team to a 3–3 draw against Balestier Khalsa. He ended the 2021 Singapore Premier League season with 7 goals in 18 league matches.

Ilhan notched 2 goals for the Young Lions before leaving for Albirex in the mid-season transfer window. In total, Ilhan has grabbed 13 goals in 33 games, a better strike rate than his older brothers, striker-turned-defender Irfan (eight in 43) and forward Ikhsan (10 in 52), managed during their time in the league.

=== Albirex Niigata (Singapore) ===
On 21 April 2022, Albirex Niigata (S) confirmed they had signed Ilhan for the remaining 2022 season. Ilhan signed the contract which runs until the end of the 2022 season. Ilhan made his debut on 27 May 2022 in a 8–2 win against Geylang International.

His presence after coming on changed the game and he was awarded the man of the match, where he was involved in 3 of the 5 Albirex goals after coming on for 22 minutes, showing his vision, strength and composure respectively. He also assisted and scored on his debut. In his first four games for the White Swans, Ilhan has already racked up three goals. Ilhan notched his first career hat-trick in his sixth game for the club, which included an outrageous bicycle kick that opened the scoring for Albirex.

He has managed 12 goals in his first 11 matches for the Japanese side. Ilhan won the 2022 Singapore Premier League title with the White Swans, with 2 games to spare, helping his team's cause by averaging almost a goal a game with 14 goals for the White Swans since his arrival at the Jurong East Stadium. Ilhan was rewarded for his efforts in the season as he clinched 3 awards, the 2022 SPL 'Young Player of the Year' award, the 2022 'Goal of the Year' award and was also named in the 2022 SPL 'Team of the Year'.

=== Deinze ===
On 12 December 2022, it was announced that Ilhan had signed for Belgian First Division B club Deinze and will join up with his new team after the conclusion of the 2022 AFF Championship. However, Ilhan sustained an ACL injury in the tournament, in which he could be out of action for six to nine months. On 23 September 2023, Ilhan made his first appearance for the club in a U21 Reserves Pro League match where he scored a goal against Lommel U21 in a 4–2 home win. Ilhan made his debut for the first team on 19 January 2024, coming on as a substitute for hat-trick hero Lennart Mertens in a 4–0 league win over Lierse.

=== BG Pathum United ===
On 30 July 2024, Thai League 1 club BG Pathum United announced the signing of Fandi on a four-year contract, where he also became the third Fandi brother to play at the club, after Irfan and Ikhsan Fandi. On 21 August 2024, Ilhan make his official debut for the club during the 2024–25 ASEAN Club Championship fixtures against Indonesian club PSM Makassar at the Batakan Stadium in Balikpapan. During the 2024–25 Thai League Cup round of 32 fixtures on 30 October against Bangkok, Ilhan recorded a brace of assist which open up the goal scoring account in the 17th minute for Chananan Pombuppha.

Later on in the 21st minute, he assisted Chanathip Songkrasin for the second goal of the match. BG Pathum United went on to win 5–0 to advance to the round of 16. In a league match against Lamphun Warriors on 4 November, Ilhan scored his first goal for the club by coming on from the bench and scoring a header in the 68th minute, however, the match ended with a 2–2 draw. During the second round of the 2024–25 Thai FA Cup on 20 November 2024, Ilhan made an appearance as a substitute in the 60th minute where he would go on to scored a goal in the 78th minute which proved decisive as BG Pathum United won 2–1 against Port to advanced to the next round. On 5 February 2025, Ilhan scored a crucial goal during the final group stage fixtures of the 2024–25 ASEAN Club Championship in a 4–3 win over Malaysian club Terengganu which sees his team top the group thus advancing to the knockout stage. Ilhan went on to win the 2024–25 ASEAN Club Championship 'Young Player of the Tournament' award.

==== Loan to Buriram United ====
On 7 June 2025, it was announced that Ilhan was loaned out to defending league champions Buriram United until the end of the 2025–26 season. During the first round of the Thai FA Cup, Ilhan scored a brace and also provided two assists in a 12–0 thrashing win over Warin Chamrap on 29 October. Ilhan suffered an injury during international duties which sideline him for four months making only 9 appearances for the club. However, he won the 2025–26 Thai League 1, 2025–26 Thai FA Cup and the 2025–26 ASEAN Club Championship with Buriram United.

=== Lion City Sailors ===
On 20 July 2026, Ilhan returned home to signed with Lion City Sailors on a two-year contract.

== International career ==
=== Youth ===
Despite being only 17, Ilhan has been invited to train with the Singapore U22 squad. Ilhan received his first senior team training session in 2021. Ilhan played in an unofficial closed-door friendly against Afghanistan on 29 May 2021. Ilhan made his official international debut and started in the second-round of the 2022 FIFA World Cup qualifiers against Palestine on 3 June 2021.

=== Senior ===
On 26 March 2022, his two brothers, Irfan and Ikhsan, were on the first team against Causeway rivals, Malaysia in a Tri-Nations Series friendly match. Ilhan came on as a substitute in the 71st minute, leading to the first time that the three Fandi brothers played in the same match for the national team together. Singapore won the match 2–1.

On 17 December 2022, Ilhan scored his first international goal in a 3–1 win over Maldives in the friendly match before the start of the 2022 AFF Championship tournament, heading in from a Christopher van Huizen’s cross from the left for his first international goal on his fifth cap. He netted in back-to-back games for the Lions when he clinically headed in yet another Christopher van Huizen’s lovely floater for his second international goal in six caps, in a 3–2 win over Myanmar in the Lions' opening match of the 2022 AFF Championship.

During a match against Vietnam on 30 December 2022, Ilhan suffered a anterior cruciate ligament injury (ACL) in his left knee and was slide-lined throughout most of 2023. On 2 October that year, Ilhan was called up to the 2026 FIFA World Cup qualifiers against Guam on 12 and 17 October 2023. On 18 November 2025, in a crucial winner-takes-all tie away against Hong Kong, Ilhan scored and assisted in a come-back 2–1 win for the Lions as Singapore secured qualification for the 2027 AFC Asian Cup. This marked the first time Singapore qualified for the AFC Asian Cup through a full qualification campaign on merit and their first appearance at the tournament since 1984.

In a friendly match against China on 5 June 2026 at the Jalan Besar Stadium, Ilhan came off the bench and scored just one minute later with his weak foot.

During the opening match of the 2026 ASEAN Championship at the Morodok Techo National Stadium, Ilhan came off the bench to scored a dramatic 90+12th minute stoppage time winner, securing all three points for Singapore.

== Style of play ==
Ilhan primarily plays as a forward, although he is capable of operating as a second striker or winger. Known for his physical presence, he combines strength with intelligent movement to lead the line effectively. He is recognised for his clinical finishing, possesses the ability to score from outside the penalty area with powerful strikes, displays confidence and effectiveness when using his weaker foot while also possessing the pace to exploit space behind opposing defences.

Noted for his footwork, coordination and composure as cited by Singapore football legend, Noh Alam Shah. In the 2020 season, he was given the role as a false 9 as he "has really good technique and good reading of the game", pointed out by head coach Nazri Nasir.

== Personal life ==
Ilhan is the third son of Singaporean footballing legend Fandi Ahmad and South African model Wendy Jacobs. His brothers, Irfan and Ikhsan, are also footballers. Irfan is playing for Port while Ikhsan is playing for BG Pathum United, both in the Thai League 1. He has an older sister Iman, who is a singer, actress and model, and a younger brother Iryan who plays for Young Lions.

His grandfather, Ahmad Wartam, was an ex-national goalkeeper. Hafiz Abu Sujad and the national team's physiotherapist Nurhafizah are the cousins of his father Fandi Ahmad.

== Career statistics ==
=== Club ===
As of match played 6 Sept 2026

Appearances and goals by club, season and competition
Club	Season	League			National cup		League cup		Continental		Shopee Cup		Total	
Club	Season	Division	Apps	Goals	Apps	Goals	Apps	Goals	Apps	Goals	Apps	Goals	Apps	Goals
Young Lions	2019	Singapore Premier League	4	2	0	0	0	0	—		—		4	2
Young Lions	2020	Singapore Premier League	8	2	0	0	0	0	—		—		8	2
Young Lions	2021	Singapore Premier League	18	7	0	0	0	0	—		—		18	7
Young Lions	2022	Singapore Premier League	3	2	0	0	0	0	—		—		3	2
Young Lions	Total		33	13	0	0	0	0	0	0	0	0	33	13
Albirex Niigata (S)	2022	Singapore Premier League	18	15	6	3	0	0	—		—		24	18
Albirex Niigata (S)	Total		18	15	6	3	0	0	0	0	0	0	24	18
Deinze	2022–23	Challenger Pro League	0	0	0	0	—		—		—		0	0
Deinze	2023–24	Challenger Pro League	1	0	0	0	—		—		—		1	0
Deinze	Total		1	0	0	0	0	0	0	0	0	0	1	0
Deinze U21	2023–24	Reserve Pro League	15	8	0	0	0	0	—		—		15	8
Deinze U21	Total		15	8	0	0	0	0	0	0	0	0	15	8
BG Pathum United	2024–25	Thai League 1	16	2	4	3	2	0	—		8 (Note: Five appearances and two goals in ASEAN Club Championship, three appearances in Singapore Cup)	2	30	7
BG Pathum United	Total		16	2	4	3	2	0	0	0	8	2	30	7
Buriram United (loan)	2025–26	Thai League 1	6	0	1	2	0	0	2	0	0	0	9	2
Buriram United (loan)	Total		6	0	1	2	0	0	2	0	0	0	9	2
Lion City Sailors	2026–27	Singapore Premier League	1	0	0	0	1	2	0	0	0	0	2	2
Lion City Sailors	Total		1	0	0	0	1	2	0	0	0	0	2	2
Career total			90	38	11	8	3	2	2	0	8	2	114	50

- Young Lions are ineligible for qualification to AFC competitions in their respective leagues.

=== International ===
As of match played 15 August 2026

Appearances and goals by national team and year
National team	Year	Apps	Goals
Singapore
Singapore	2021	1	0
Singapore	2022	7	2
Singapore	2023	4	0
Singapore	2024	2	0
Singapore	2025	9	3
Singapore	2026	7	5
Total		30	10

=== International goals ===
No.	Date	Venue	Opponent	Score	Result	Competition
1.	17 December 2022	Jalan Besar Stadium, Jalan Besar, Singapore	Maldives	1–0	3–1	Friendly
2.	24 December 2022	Jalan Besar Stadium, Jalan Besar, Singapore	Myanmar	1–1	3–2	2022 AFF Championship
3.	4 September 2025	Bukit Jalil National Stadium, Kuala Lumpur, Malaysia	Malaysia	1–2	2–1	Friendly
4.	9 September 2025	Kallang Football Hub, Kallang, Singapore	Myanmar	1–1	1–1	Friendly
5.	18 November 2025	Kai Tak Sports Park, Kowloon, Hong Kong	Hong Kong	2–1	2–1	2027 AFC Asian Cup qualification
6.	5 June 2026	Jalan Besar Stadium, Jalan Besar, Singapore	China	1–2	1–2	Friendly
7.	24 July 2026	Morodok Techo National Stadium, Phnom Penh, Cambodia	Cambodia	2–1	2–1	2026 ASEAN Championship
8.	27 July 2026	Jalan Besar Stadium, Jalan Besar, Singapore	Timor-Leste	1–0	2–0	2026 ASEAN Championship
9.	7 August 2026	Jalan Besar Stadium, Jalan Besar, Singapore	Indonesia	1–1	1–1	2026 ASEAN Championship
10.	15 August 2026	Jalan Besar Stadium, Jalan Besar, Singapore	Thailand	1–3	1–3	2026 ASEAN Championship

== Honours ==
=== Club ===
Albirex Niigata (Singapore)

- Singapore Premier League: 2022

Buriram United

- Thai League 1: 2025–26
- Thai FA Cup: 2025–26
- ASEAN Club Championship: 2025–26

=== Individual ===
- Singapore Premier League Young Player of the Year: 2022
- Singapore Premier League Team of the Year: 2022
- Singapore Premier League Goal of the Year: 2022
- ASEAN Club Championship: Young Player of the Tournament: 2024–25
