= Amiruldin Asraf =

Singaporean footballer

Personal information
- Full name: Muhammad Amiruldin Asraf bin Muhammad Nordin
- Date of birth: January 8, 1997 (age 29)
- Place of birth: Singapore
- Height: 1.78 m (5 ft 10 in)
- Position: Striker

Team information
- Current team: Balestier Khalsa
- Number: 29

Senior career*
Years	Team	Apps	(Gls)
2017–2023	Lion City Sailors	51	(15)
2023	Young Lions	6	(2)
2024–2025	Balestier Khalsa	17	(2)

International career
2015–2016	Singapore U19	4	(2)
2017–2019	Singapore U22	27	(8)
Medal record
Men's football
Representing Singapore
Merlion Cup
Winner	2019 Singapore
- * Club domestic league appearances and goals as of July 1, 2025

Amiruldin Asraf (born January 8, 1997) is a Singaporean professional footballer who plays as a striker and last played for Singapore Premier League club Balestier Khalsa.

== Club career ==
=== Home United (Now known as Lion City Sailors) ===
After graduating from the NFA squad, Amiruldin moved to play for the Home United Prime League squad. He finished as the top scorer in the 2016 prime league scoring 16 goals in 24 league appearances and was promoted to the main squad in 2017. In his debut season, Amiruldin scored 6 goals in 20 league appearances for his new team. In November 2017, he was awarded the S.League best Young player of the Year award. It was announced in December 2017 that Assad have sign a new 2 year's contract with Home United, committing his future with the club to 2020. In June 2018, he was awarded the man of the match award for his outstanding display against Young Lions, where he scored his first career hat trick and assisted Song Ui-young in the closing minutes to lead his club to a 4–0 victory. He finished the 2018 season with 8 goals in 21 league appearances.

=== Young Lions ===
On 1 July 2023, Amiruldin joined Young Lions as an overage player. On 12 July 2023, he scored on his debut coming on as a substitute in a 4-2 lost to Balestier Khalsa.

=== Balestier Khalsa ===
On 3 January 2024, Amiruldin joined Balestier Khalsa on a permanent transfer.

== International career ==
Amiruldin is also part of the 2013 Lion City Cup, representing Singapore in the tournament He also represented Singapore in various level since his young days. Amiruldin also represented Singapore U21 team who played against Hong Kong U21 in 2016. He also represented the team in the 2015 AFFU19 Youth Championship.

== Personal life ==
Amiruldin is the son of ex-Singapore striker Nordin Khalil. Amiruldin studied at Loyang Secondary School.

== Club career statistics ==
As of 1 July 2025.

Club	Season	League			Cup		Continental		Other		Total	
Club	Season	Division	Apps	Goals	Apps	Goals	Apps	Goals	Apps	Goals	Apps	Goals
Home United	2016	S.League	1	0	0	0	–		0	0	1	0
Home United	2017	S.League	22	2	1	1	–		8	1	31	4
Home United	2018	Singapore Premier League	16	0	1	0	–		3	0	20	0
Home United	2019	Singapore Premier League	13	1	0	0	–		3	0	16	1
Home United	Total		52	3	2	1	0	0	14	1	68	5
Lion City Sailors	2020	Singapore Premier League	0	0	0	0	0	0	0	0	0	0
Lion City Sailors	2021	Singapore Premier League	0	0	0	0	0	0	0	0	0	0
Lion City Sailors	2022	Singapore Premier League	3	0	0	0	4	0	0	0	7	0
Lion City Sailors	Total		3	0	0	0	4	0	0	0	7	0
Young Lions FC	2023	Singapore Premier League	6	2	4	0	0	0	0	0	10	2
Young Lions FC	Total		6	2	4	0	0	0	0	0	10	2
Balestier Khalsa	2024–25	Singapore Premier League	17	2	3	0	0	0	0	0	20	2
Balestier Khalsa	Total		17	2	3	0	0	0	0	0	20	2
Career total			78	7	9	1	4	0	14	1	105	9

== International statistics ==
=== U22 International caps ===
No	Date	Venue	Opponent	Result	Competition
1	9 July 2017	Choa Chu Kang Stadium, Singapore	India	0-1 (lost)	Friendly
2	12 July 2017	Choa Chu Kang Stadium, Singapore	India	1-0 (won)	Friendly
3	14 August 2017	MP Selayang Stadium, Malaysia	Myanmar	0-2 (lost)	2017 Southeast Asian Games
4	16 August 2017	MP Selayang Stadium, Malaysia	Malaysia	1-2 (lost)	2017 Southeast Asian Games
5	18 August 2017	MP Selayang Stadium, Malaysia	Laos	2-0 (won)	2017 Southeast Asian Games
6	23 August 2017	MP Selayang Stadium, Malaysia	Brunei	1-0 (won)	2017 Southeast Asian Games
7	20 June 2018	Jalan Besar Stadium, Singapore	Myanmar	0-2 (lost)	Friendly
8	22 March 2019	MFF Football Centre, Ulaanbaatar, Mongolia	Hong Kong	1-1 (draw)	2020 AFC U-23 Championship qualification
9	24 March 2019	MFF Football Centre, Ulaanbaatar, Mongolia	North Korea	1-1 (draw)	2020 AFC U-23 Championship qualification
10	26 March 2019	MFF Football Centre, Ulaanbaatar, Mongolia	Mongolia	3-1 (won)	2020 AFC U-23 Championship qualification
11	7 June 2019	Jalan Besar Stadium, Kallang, Singapore	Philippines	3-0 (won)	2019 Merlion Cup
12	9 June 2019	Jalan Besar Stadium, Kallang, Singapore	Thailand	1-0 (won)	2019 Merlion Cup
13	6 September 2019	Bishan Stadium, Bishan, Singapore	Fiji	2-0 (won)	Friendly
14	9 October 2019	Bishan Stadium, Bishan, Singapore	United Arab Emirates	0-3 (lost)	Friendly

=== U22 International goals ===
International goals by date, venue, opponent, score, result and competition
No.	Date	Venue	Opponent	Score	Result	Competition
1	19 February 2017	Thuwunna Stadium, Yangon, Myanmar	Myanmar	1–0	3-1	Friendly
2	19 February 2017	Thuwunna Stadium, Yangon, Myanmar	Myanmar	2–0	3-1	Friendly
3	16 August 2017	Shah Alam Stadium, Selangor, Malaysia	Malaysia	1–0	1-2	2017 Southeast Asian Games
4	26 March 2019	MFF Football Centre, Ulaanbaatar, Mongolia	Mongolia	1–1	3-1	2020 AFC U-23 Championship qualification
5	7 June 2019	Jalan Besar Stadium, Jalan Besar, Singapore	Philippines	1–0	3-0	Merlion Cup

=== U19 International caps ===
No	Date	Venue	Opponent	Result	Competition
1	23 August 2015	Laos National Stadium, Vientiane, Laos	Myanmar	0-1 (lost)	2015 AFF U-19 Youth Championship
2	11 September 2016	Hàng Đẫy Stadium, Hanoi, Vietnam	Vietnam	0-0 (draw)	2016 AFF U-19 Youth Championship
3	15 September 2016	Hàng Đẫy Stadium, Hanoi, Vietnam	Malaysia	1-2 (lost)	2016 AFF U-19 Youth Championship
4	17 September 2016	Hàng Đẫy Stadium, Hanoi, Vietnam	Philippines	2-1 (won)	2016 AFF U-19 Youth Championship
5	19 September 2016	Hàng Đẫy Stadium, Hanoi, Vietnam	Timor-Leste	0-2 (lost)	2016 AFF U-19 Youth Championship

== Honours ==
=== Club ===
Lion City Sailors

- Singapore Premier League: 2021
- Singapore Community Shield: 2022

=== International ===
Singapore U23

- Merlion Cup: 2019
