= Ahmad Wartam =

Singaporean footballer

Personal information
- Full name: Ahmad bin Wartam
- Date of birth: 1935
- Place of birth: Singapore, Straits Settlements, British Malaya
- Date of death: 29 November 2014 (aged 79)
- Place of death: Singapore
- Position: Goalkeeper

Senior career*
Years	Team	Apps	(Gls)
- Fathul Karib
- Singapore FA

International career
1963–1969	Singapore		
- * Club domestic league appearances and goals

Ahmad bin Wartam (1935 – 29 November 2014) was a Singapore international footballer who played as a goalkeeper. He is the father of former Singapore international striker Fandi Ahmad, and grandfather to Singaporean footballers Irfan, Ikhsan, Iman, Ilhan, Iryan.

Ahmad started his football career as a left winger before switching to goalkeeping after a knee injury. He played for Fathul Karib in the SAFA League, and for Singapore FA in the Malaysia Cup. Following a neck injury to regular custodian Wilfred Skinner, he played in Singapore's victory in the 1967 FAM Cup final. He retained his place in the 1967 Malaysia Cup after Skinner was dropped from the squad and started the final in a 2–1 loss to Perak.

In October 2014, Ahmad was admitted into intensive care at Tan Tock Seng Hospital for heart and lung problems. He died a month later on 29 November.

== Honours ==
Singapore FA

- FAM Cup: 1967
