= 2019 Merlion Cup =

Tournament details
- Host country: Singapore
- Dates: 7–9 June
- Teams: 4 (from 1 confederation)
- Venue: 1 (in 1 host city)

Final positions
- Champions: Singapore (1st title)
- Runners-up: Thailand
- Third place: Indonesia
- Fourth place: Philippines

Tournament statistics
- Matches played: 4
- Goals scored: 12 (3 per match)
- Top scorer(s): (Indonesia) Muhammad Rafli (3 goals)

The 2019 Merlion Cup is an international men's under-23 football competition organised by the Football Association of Singapore (FAS).

== Participants ==
The following are the participants in this year's tournament:

- Singapore (Host)
- Indonesia
- Philippines
- Thailand

== Venue ==
Singapore
Jalan Besar Stadium
Capacity: 6,000

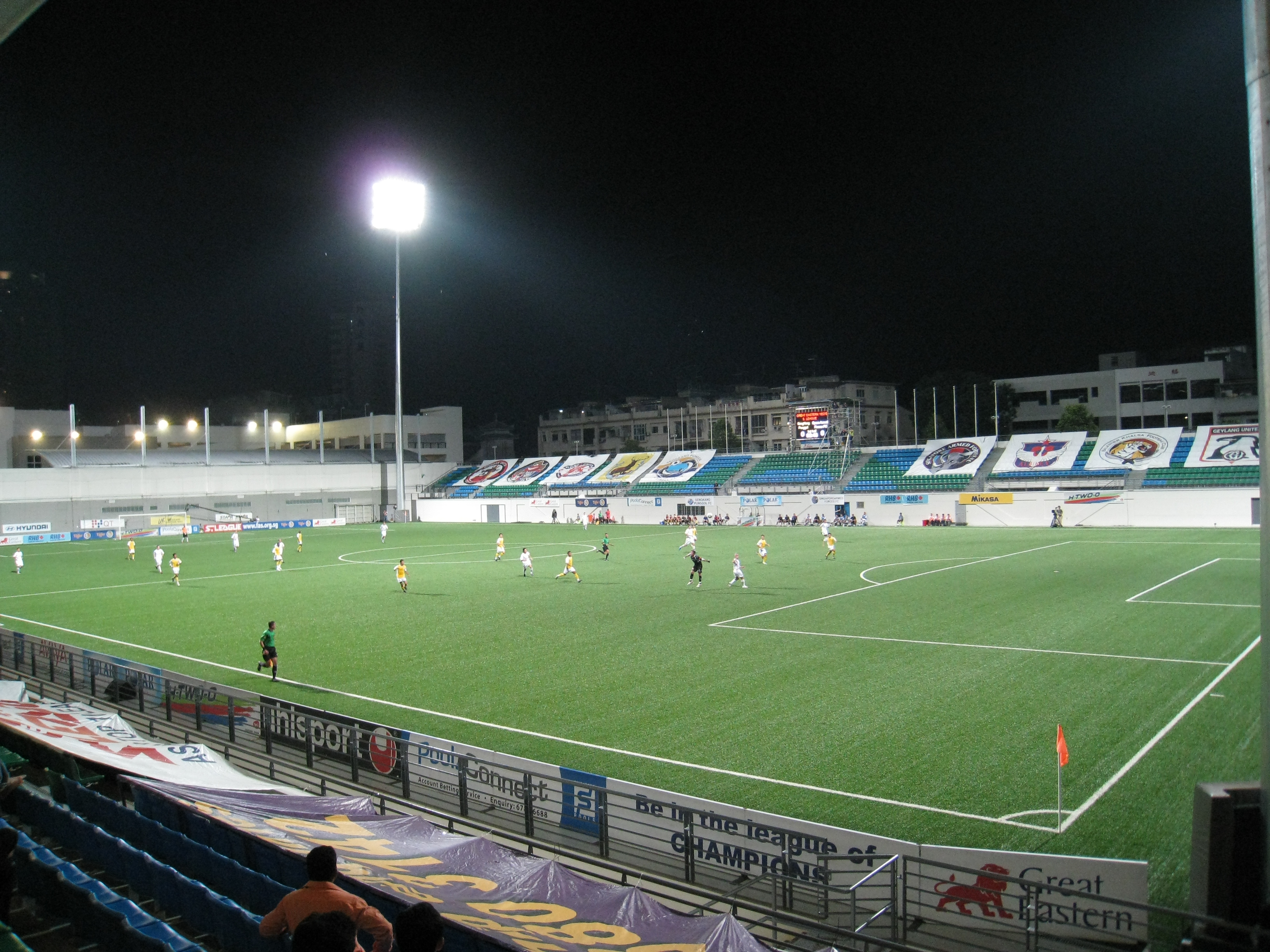

== Squads ==
A final squad of 23 players (three of whom must be goalkeepers) must be registered one day before the first match of the tournament.

== Fixtures ==
=== Bracket ===
The draw for the tournament was held on 16 May 2019.

Semi-finals
7 June
Thailand	2
Indonesia	1
7 June
Singapore	3
Philippines	0

Final
9 June
Singapore	1
Thailand	0
Third place match
9 June
Indonesia	5
Philippines	0

=== Semi-finals ===
7 June 2019
16:30

Thailand	2–1	Indonesia
Saringkan 5' (pen.); Ekanit 11'	Report	Witan 42'

Jalan Besar Stadium, Singapore
7 June 2019
19:30

Singapore	3–0	Philippines
Amiruldin 26'; Irfan 62'; Ikhsan 67'	Report

Jalan Besar Stadium, Singapore

=== Third place match ===
9 June 2019
16:30

Indonesia	5–0	Philippines
Rafli 6', 60', 67'; Rizky Dwi 47' (pen.); Asnawi 73'	Report

Jalan Besar Stadium, Singapore

=== Final ===
9 June 2019
19:30

Singapore	1–0	Thailand
Ikhsan 35'	Report

Jalan Besar Stadium, Singapore

== Final standing ==
Rank	Team
1st place, gold medalist(s)	Singapore
2nd place, silver medalist(s)	Thailand
3rd place, bronze medalist(s)	Indonesia
4	Philippines

== Statistics ==
=== Goalscorers ===
There were 12 goals scored in 4 matches, for an average of 3 goals per match.

3 goals

- (Indonesia) Muhammad Rafli

2 goals

- (Singapore) Ikhsan Fandi

1 goal

- (Indonesia) Asnawi Mangkualam
- (Indonesia) Rizky Dwi
- (Indonesia) Witan Sulaeman
- (Singapore) Amiruldin Asraf
- (Singapore) Irfan Fandi
- (Thailand) Ekanit Panya
- (Thailand) Saringkan Promsupa
