= Joakim Gomez =

Singaporean host and radio DJ (born 1988)

- Gomez in 2026
- Born: Joakim Jude Gomez; 22 July 1988 (age 38)
- Education: Catholic High School; Chong Boon Secondary School; Nanyang Academy of Fine Arts
- Occupations: Host; radio DJ
- Years active: 2012–present
- Known for: Singapore Idol contestant

Chinese name
- Simplified Chinese: 周劲
Transcriptions
Standard Mandarin
- Hanyu Pinyin: Zhōu Jìn

Joakim Jude Gomez (Note: Chinese: 周劲; pinyin: Zhōu Jìn) (born 22 July 1988) is a Singaporean radio DJ and television presenter. He is a full-time DJ at 987FM, and hosts events such as the annual National Day Parade. He is a Singaporean of Korean-Indian descent with Portuguese roots.

Gomez was raised by his Korean mother, after his parents divorced when he was five years old, but kept in contact with his father. He had studied theatre in the Nanyang Academy of Fine Arts. In 2006, Gomez competed in the second season of Singapore Idol, in which he placed fifth. He received harsh comments from judges and viewers, describing his self-esteem at its lowest.

In 2012, Gomez started his part-time hosting career on 987FM, before co-hosting full-time with Sonia Chew on 987FM since 2014. After being a substitute host for the National Day Parade (NDP), he started hosting the NDP in 2012, and had hosted it 12 times by 2025.

== Early life ==
Gomez was born on 22 July 1988 and is a Korean-Indian Singaporean with Portuguese roots. He was raised in Singapore by only his Korean mother when he was five years old as his parents divorced, but remained in contact with his father. In Catholic High School, the primary school in which he studied, he felt angry about his family situation, but accepted the situation when he grew up.

He finished his O-levels in Chong Boon Secondary School, in which he studied from 2001 to 2005, scoring well in accounting, which he described as a possible career that he did not pursue. He then joined the Nanyang Academy of Fine Arts (NAFA) studying theatre, thinking that it fit his desire of acting in theatre and television, after being introduced to it by Ebi Shankara, another NAFA student who also participated in Singapore Idol.

Gomez had also worked part-time in Mediacorp after participating in Singapore Idol in 2006, acting in the second season of the Channel 5 drama, Lifeline, and the Okto youth drama, The Band. He then served National Service in the Singapore Armed Forces (SAF) Music and Drama Company from 2011 to 2012.

=== Singapore Idol ===
In 2006, Gomez competed in the second season of Singapore Idol. He placed fifth in the competition and sang poorly according to Kwok Kar Peng of The New Paper. Stephanie of The Assembly said that he placed higher than expected for his ability. Despite not winning, he was a memorable contestant, according to Celine Tan of 8days. He was criticised heavily by the judges, Dick Lee, Florence Lian, and Ken Lim. Gomez received hate comments from viewers and got into public fights, such as when a bottle was thrown at him at Orchard Road. The audience brought posters of monkeys in reference to Lee comparing Gomez to a "performing monkey". He wanted to stay at home and avoid the negative attention, describing his self-esteem at the lowest point in life, feeling angry, but had close friends and family members for emotional support. He used to regret going on the show, but moved on after growing up, saying that it was a harsh introduction to his career.

== Career ==
In 2012, Gomez joined 987FM as a part-time DJ, and started doing it full-time from 2014, co-hosting with Sonia Chew for The Wake Up Call and The Shock Circuit. He also co-hosted with Chew for a livestreamed online show titled Sofa So Good during the COVID-19 pandemic, which had accumulated 30,000 views in an episode over a weekend. Chew described their dynamic as their branding as co-hosts on 987FM, "keep[ing] the listeners guessing" such as posting on Instagram that Gomez was friendzoned. Gomez maintains a friendship with Chew, but says that social media constantly tries to frame them as romantic partners.

Gomez was inspired to enter the media industry by Michael Jackson, Gurmit Singh, and his father, quoting examples such as people expressing their gratitude to his father for singing at the hotel lounge of Holiday Inn, Jackson being able to emotionally move large crowds of people, and Singh being able to command synchronised movement of large crowds.

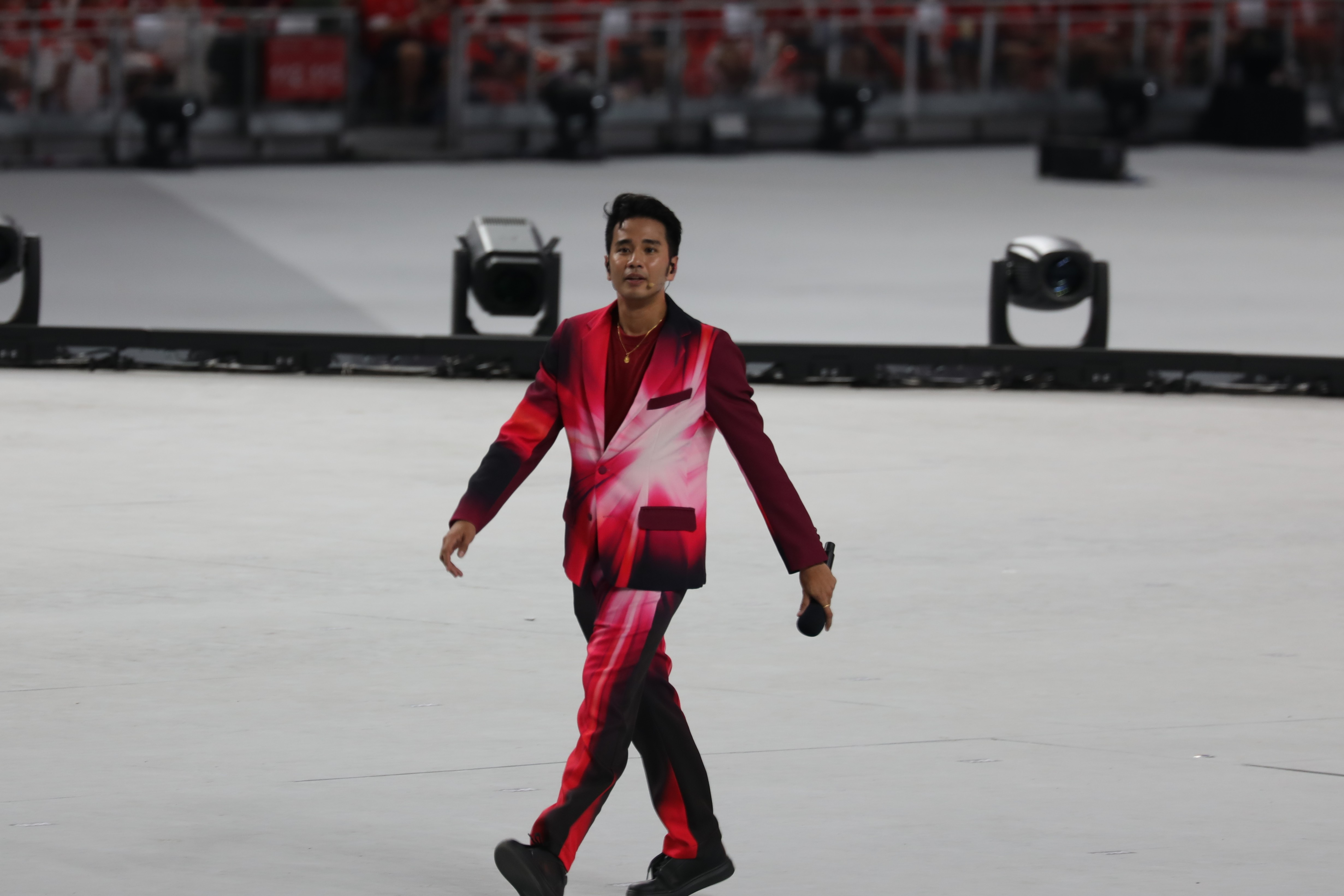
Gomez hosting National Day Parade 2026

Gomez had hosted events at Chong Boon Secondary School, where he studied. He has also hosted events such as formal SAF dinners attended by domestic and foreign officials during his National Service, from 2011 to 2012. He also hosts for television and live shows. After being a substitute host in a preview iteration of the annual National Day Parade (NDP), an opportunity from being in the Singapore Armed Forces Music and Drama Company, he first started hosting the NDP in 2012. In 2018, he hosted the NDP with Chew, as the first radio partners to host the show together. By 2025, he had hosted the NDP 12 times.

In 2010, he sang in a group at the opening and closing ceremonies of the Youth Olympic Games, and at Marina Bay Sands' show, Wonder Full.

== Personal life ==
Gomez first met Sonia Chew, a co-hosting DJ at 987FM, at a halloween night at Butter Factory, a night club which closed in 2015. They were introduced to each other by a mutual friend at Butter Factory. In November 2010, before enlisting in the Singapore Army, he went on a date with Chew, but did not continue with a second date. They kept in touch, and coincidentally met again in 2012 during training at the 987FM studio, retaining a brotherly relationship; Gomez is single.

Gomez speaks English, Mandarin and basic Korean, but does not speak Tamil. Gomez likes running alone such as on marathons, and said that sports could have been a possible career path. He is an ambassador for Standard Chartered Marathon, a role he took on after a difficult period, quoting work stress and worsened personal life, gaining weight after having been in a healthy range.

Gomez enjoys a busy schedule. He grew up reading 8days, a once-physical online magazine, and was featured on the cover page with Chew in 2018 before it went digital.
