= Iman Fandi =

Singaporean actress, singer and model

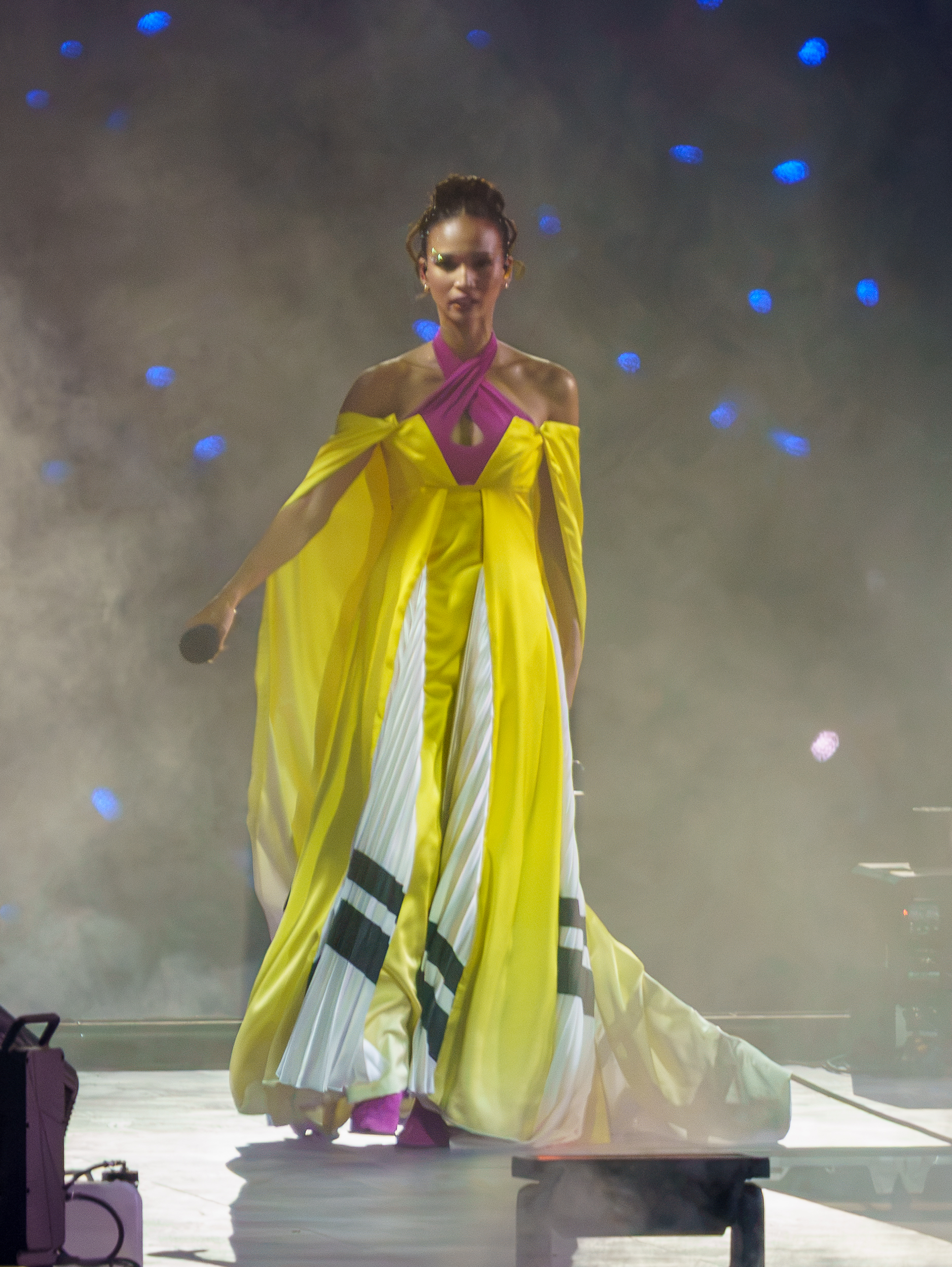
- Iman Fandi at National Day Parade 2026
- Born: Iman binte Fandi; 18 May 2000 (age 26)
- Education: CHIJ Our Lady of the Nativity, Singapore Sports School, CHIJ St Joseph's Convent
- Height: 1.69 m (5 ft 7 in)
- Parent(s): Fandi Ahmad (father), Wendy Jacobs (mother)
- Family: Irfan Fandi (brother), Ikhsan Fandi (brother), Ilhan Fandi (brother), Iryan Fandi (brother)

Iman binte Fandi Ahmad (born 18 May 2000) is a Singaporean actress, singer and model. She is the only daughter to local football icon Fandi Ahmad and the former South African model Wendy Jacobs. Iman forayed into modelling at 14 years old when she clinched two titles at the The New Paper's New Face competition in 2014.

In May 2026, Iman was recognized in the 2026 Forbes 30 Under 30 Asia list within the entertainment and sports category.

== Early life & family ==
Iman is the third of five children to the Singaporean footballer Fandi Ahmad and retired model Wendy Jacobs. In a 2018 interview, Wendy Jacobs shared that Iman meant “faith”. Wendy and Fandi had named her in the hope that she would have faith to carry out "anything and everything she puts her mind to". Iman became a vegan at 15 years old with the influence of her friend Sophia.

=== Education ===
Iman went to CHIJ Our Lady of the Nativity in primary school. She then joined her older siblings Irfan and Ikhsan in the Singapore Sports School. In Secondary 3, Iman went on to study at CHIJ St Joseph's Convent. She took a gap year from her studies in 2017 when she worked part-time at a hairdressing salon, took on modelling jobs and traveled the world. After her gap year, Iman pursued a private course in Psychology.

=== Track and field ===
Iman started participating in track and field meets in primary school. During that time, she went from a track novice to a 100-metre sprint champion. She won the 100-metre final in the National Inter-Primary School Track and Field Championships for her school - CHIJ Our Lady of The Nativity - at a timing of 13.68 seconds.

== Modelling ==
As of 2020, Iman is a model under LINKModels International. Iman has appeared on the covers of publications like Harper's Bazaar and Nylon. In June 2019, she was Nylon's Digital Cover Girl.She has endorsed brands like The Body Shop and Adidas. Alongside Joakim Gomez, Michelle Sng and Danial Ashriq, Iman is an Adidas Runner.

=== The New Paper New Face (2014) ===
Iman started her modelling career when she took part in The New Paper’s New Face 2014 competition during which she won the following titles - "Miss Popularity" and "New Look Miss Fashionista". Following her success at the competition, she was featured on the front cover of Elle Magazine with models Fiona Fussi and Vivien Ong in January 2015.

At only 14 years old, Iman was the youngest participant in the competition. Iman’s young age prompted conversation over the potential dangers that underage models may face, as well as how other modelling agencies have taken action to safeguard their safety.

=== Brand identity & image ===
In a 2019 interview with Harper’s Bazaar, Iman shared that she advocates for veganism, eco-friendliness and anti-animal cruelty as part of her brand identity.

Iman has cited her mother as her motivation to pursue a career in modelling. Iman and Wendy Jacobs have done interviews together for publications like Marie-France and Harper's Bazaar. They have also been featured together in advertisements and shoots from time to time. In 2015, the mother-daughter duo modelled for the "ALDO FIGHTS AIDS" #PERFECTPAIR campaign. In 2019, Iman and Wendy appeared at the Harper’s Bazaar NewGen Fashion Awards together.

== Acting ==
Iman made her acting debut in 2019 with a role in a web-series called Emerald Hill.

== Filmography ==
=== Television ===
Year	Channel	Title	Role	Refs.
2019	Toggle TV	Emerald Hill	Jasmine	

== Discography ==
=== Album ===
List of studio albums and selected details
Title	Details
That Girl	Released: 15 November 2024; Label: Universal Music Singapore; Format: Digital download, streaming

=== Singles ===
List of singles as lead artist, showing year released and album name
Title	Year	Album
"Timeframe"	2021	Non-album single
"Love Me Little More"	2021	Non-album single
"Top Bop"	2023	That Girl
"Shine Your Light"	2023	Non-album single
"Baseball Bat"	2023	That Girl
"That Girl"	2024	That Girl
"Leave You on Read"	2024	That Girl
"We Time" (with Vidi)	2024	That Girl
"Hari Raya Raya Raya"	2025	Non-album single
"Giants"	2026	Non-album single
"It Is"	2026	TBA
