= Merlion Cup =

Association football tournament in Singapore

- Founded: 1982
- Current champions: Malaysia U22 (1st title)
- Most championships: Australia (2 titles)

The Merlion Cup is an invitational football tournament that was held in Singapore annually from 1982–1986, in 1992, 2009 and 2019 and 2023. Participants included full national sides, Olympic sides, Invitational XI's and club teams. After the 1986 tournament, four Canadian players (Igor Vrablic, Hector Marinaro, David Norman and Chris Chueden) were suspended after a match-fixing scandal.

== History ==
The inaugural Merlion Cup was held in 1982 and was held annually until 1986. The tournament was not held in 1987 due to financial constraints and the planned tournament would have scheduling conflict with the Malaysia Cup. The 1986 edition experienced the worst match attendance since the tournament's inaugural edition in 1982 with only 12,000 people showing up to watch the final between China and North Korea. Two more editions of the tournament were held-in 1992 and 2009.

=== 2016 planned revival ===
At the 2013 Football Association of Singapore (FAS) annual general meeting, FAS president Zainudin Nordin expressed intention to revive the tournament. In early 2015, MP & Silva and FAS managed to secure a six-year partnership worth S$25 million. MP & Silva planned to organise the tournament slated in January 2016 at the 55,000-seater National Stadium. However, in late 2015, after six months of negotiations, it was announced that negotiation to use the National Stadium as the venue of the Merlion Cup was stalled due to the Singapore Sports Hub demanding an upfront payment reportedly a six-digit figure to rent the stadium as the venue of two editions of the tournament in 2016 and 2017. This led the organisers to find an alternative venue and also considered holding the tournament in Malaysia.

On 25 December 2015, it was announced that the 2016 Merlion Cup is postponed indefinitely. Among the teams invited to participate along with hosts Singapore were the national teams of Myanmar, and the Philippines and club sides Shanghai Shenhua and Yokohama F. Marinos.

=== 2019 return ===
On 18 May 2019, it was announced that the Merlion Cup would return, taking place from 7–9 June 2019. It would be an U22 tournament, featuring Singapore U22, Indonesia U22, Thailand U22 and Philippines U22. Singapore U22 would face Philippines U22 while Indonesia U22 would play Thailand U22 in the semi-finals.

=== 2023 return ===
After a three-year hiatus, Merlion Cup was announced to take place from 24–26 March 2023. The tournament would be a pure U22 with no overage players allowed as per previous editions. The tournament would feature the U22 teams from Singapore, Cambodia, Hong Kong and Malaysia.

== Results ==
| Ed. | Year | Final | | | Third place match or losing semi-finalists | | |
| Ed. | Year | Winners | Score | Runners-up | Third place | Score | Fourth place |
|---|---|---|---|---|---|---|---|
| 1 | 1982 | Australia | 3–2 | South Korea B | Indonesia | 0–0 (a.e.t.) (4–3 p) | Malaysia |
| 2 | 1983 | Australia | 4–2 | Singapore | China | 2–0 | South Korea B |
| 3 | 1984 | Iraq | 2–1 (a.e.t.) | South Korea B | Netherlands | 3–0 | Australia |
| 4 | 1985 | Yugoslavia Amateur | – (Note: Round-robin format.) | Singapore | (Germany) Eintracht Frankfurt | – | Malaysia |
| 5 | 1986 | China | 2–1 | North Korea | Canada | 1–0 | Singapore |
| 6 | 1992 | South Korea B | 3–1 | China | Singapore | – | (Russia) Lokomotiv Moscow |
| 7 | 2009 | (England) Liverpool | 5–0 | Singapore | | | |
| 8 | 2019 | Singapore U22 | 1–0 | Thailand U22 | Indonesia U22 | 5–0 | Philippines U22 |
| 9 | 2023 | Malaysia U22 | 2–1 | Hong Kong U22 | Cambodia U22 | 2–1 | Singapore U22 |
