= 2013 Lion City Cup =

2013 25th Lion City Cup
25th Canon Lion City Cup 2013

Tournament details
- Host country: Singapore
- Dates: 8 – 16 June (9 days)
- Teams: 6 (from 3 confederations)
- Venue: 1 (in 1 host city)

Final positions
- Champions: (Brazil) Corinthians (1st title)
- Runners-up: (Netherlands) PSV Eindhoven
- Third place: (Germany) Eintracht Frankfurt
- Fourth place: (England) Arsenal

Tournament statistics
- Matches played: 11
- Goals scored: 49 (4.45 per match)
- Attendance: 47,766 (4,342 per match)
- Top scorer: (Brazil) Léo Jaba (6)
- Best player: (Brazil) Matheus
- Best goalkeeper: (Brazil) Victor

The Lion City Cup is one of the oldest and prestigious youth tournaments in the world with its first edition dating back to 1977, organised by The Red Card and co-organised by the national footballing body Football Association of Singapore.

The 25th Lion City Cup, also known as the 25th Canon Lion City Cup due to sponsorship reasons, was held from 8 to 16 June 2013 at the Jalan Besar Stadium.

This year's edition included popular names set to come down to Singapore to battle against the hosts' youth teams. The teams also tour Singapore to learn more about the nation.

== Teams ==
The participating teams usually include other big clubs especially those based in Europe and Singapore's very own National Football Academy (NFA) boys. It served to provide greater exposure for the Baby Cubs. Six teams will compete for the prestigious trophy in this edition.

This year, the Under-15 teams of Arsenal F.C., PSV Eindhoven, Eintracht Frankfurt and Corinthians were invited to the tournament. Singapore was represented by the NFA Under-15 and Under-16 teams.

The six teams are divided into two groups of three, and the top two teams of each group will advance into the semi-finals. They will then compete for the final, and the losers of the semi-finals will play in the 3rd/4th Placing play-off while the last-placed teams in their respective groups will play in the 5th/6th Placing play-off.

- (England) Arsenal
- (Brazil) Corinthians
- (Germany) Eintracht Frankfurt
- (Singapore) NFA U-15 team
- (Singapore) NFA U-16 team
- (Netherlands) PSV Eindhoven

== Venue ==
City	Stadium	Capacity	Location	Hotel	Location
Singapore	Jalan Besar Stadium	8,000	1.3100°N 103.8603°E	PARKROYAL on Kitchener Road	1.3123°N 103.8540°E

== Group stage ==
=== Group A ===
Team	Pld	W	D	L	GF	GA	GD	Pts
(Germany) Eintracht Frankfurt (A)	2	1	0	1	5	5	0	3
(England) Arsenal (A)	2	1	0	1	5	5	0	3
Singapore NFA U-16	2	1	0	1	3	3	0	3

Updated to match(es) played on 12 June 2013. Source:
Rules for classification: 1) points; 2) goal difference; 3) number of goals scored.
(A) Advances to the knockout stage.
8 June 2013
20:45

Singapore NFA U-16	1 – 2	(England) Arsenal
Irfan Fandi 61'	Report	Faiq Jerfri 16'; Harry Donovan 66'

Jalan Besar Stadium, Kallang
Attendance: 5,205
Referee: Phung Dinh Dung (Vietnam)

10 June 2013
18:00

Arsenal (England)	3 – 4	(Germany) Eintracht Frankfurt
Nils Herdt 1', 40'; Ahmed Ben Diack 25'; Adrian Matuschewski 75'	Report	Christopher Willock 32' (pen.) kasyah Nasrullah Wallace 42'; Kaylen Miles Hinds 49'

Jalan Besar Stadium, Kallang
Attendance: 1,967
Referee: Mohd Yazeen (Singapore)

12 June 2013
20:45

Eintracht Frankfurt (Germany)	1 – 2	Singapore NFA U-16
Marvin Diehl 78'	Report	Irfan Fandi 8'; Andin Addie 18'

Jalan Besar Stadium, Kallang
Attendance: 5,982
Referee: Suhaizi Shukri (Malaysia)

=== Group B ===
Team	Pld	W	D	L	GF	GA	GD	Pts
(Brazil) Corinthians (A)	2	2	0	0	9	0	+9	6
(Netherlands) PSV Eindhoven (A)	2	0	1	1	0	2	−2	1
Singapore NFA U-15	2	0	1	1	0	7	−7	1

Updated to match(es) played on 12 June 2013. Source:
Rules for classification: 1) points; 2) goal difference; 3) number of goals scored.
(A) Advances to the knockout stage.
8 June 2013
18:00

Singapore NFA U-15	0 – 7	(Brazil) Corinthians
	Report	Léo Jaba 9', 12', 55', 73'; Wesley Duarte 63'; Matheus 64'; Rafael Mudesto 77'

Jalan Besar Stadium, Kallang
Attendance: 5,205
Referee: Suhaizi Shukri (Malaysia)

10 June 2013
20:45

PSV Eindhoven (Netherlands)	0 – 0	Singapore NFA U-15
	Report

Jalan Besar Stadium, Kallang
Attendance: 4,580
Referee: Phung Dinh Dung (Vietnam)

12 June 2013
18:00

Corinthians (Brazil)	2 – 0	(Netherlands) PSV Eindhoven
Matheus 50'; Miullen 62'	Report

Jalan Besar Stadium, Kallang
Attendance: 3,013
Referee: Mohd Yazeen (Singapore)

== Knockout stage ==
Semi-Finals
(Brazil) Corinthians	2
(England) Arsenal	0
(Germany) Eintracht Frankfurt	2
(Netherlands) PSV Eindhoven	3

Final
(Brazil) Corinthians	1 (5)
(Netherlands) PSV Eindhoven	1 (3)
Third place
(England) Arsenal	2
(Germany) Eintracht Frankfurt	3

=== Semi-finals ===
12 June 2013
18:00

Corinthians (Brazil)	2 – 0	(England) Arsenal
Matheus 15'; Léo Jaba 29'	Report

Jalan Besar Stadium, Kallang
Attendance: 4,288
Referee: Suhaizi Shukri (Malaysia)

12 June 2013
20:45

Eintracht Frankfurt (Germany)	2 – 3	(Netherlands) PSV Eindhoven
Nils Herdt 17'; Volkan Egri 83'	Report	Matthias Verreth 15', 39'; Leandro Fernandes 75'

Jalan Besar Stadium, Kallang
Attendance: 2,343
Referee: Phung Dinh Dung (Vietnam)

=== 5th/6th Placing play-off ===
14 June 2013
18:00

Singapore NFA U-16	4 – 1	Singapore NFA U-15
Adam Hakeem 3'; Syafiq Irawan 35'; Andin Addie 59'; Lionel Tan 66'	Report	Syukri Bashir 12'

Jalan Besar Stadium, Kallang
Attendance: 5,069
Referee: Suhaizi Shukri (Malaysia)

=== 3rd/4th Placing play-off ===
14 June 2013
15:15

Arsenal (England)	2 – 3	(Germany) Eintracht Frankfurt
Tolaji Bola 45'; Christopher Willock 67'	Report	Adrian Matuschewski 8', 28'; Marvin Diehl 44'

Jalan Besar Stadium, Kallang
Attendance: 4,288
Referee: Suhaizi Shukri (Malaysia)

=== Final ===
14 June 2013
20:45

Corinthians (Brazil)	1 – 1	(Netherlands) PSV Eindhoven
Léo Jaba 43'	Report	Karim Bannani 78'
Penalties
Matheus (penalty scored); Fabricio Rodrigues (penalty scored); Leonardo dos Santos (penalty scored); Renan Areias (penalty scored); Léo Jaba (penalty scored)	5 – 3	(penalty scored) Dante Rigo; (penalty scored) Jaell Hattu; (penalty scored) Lennerd Daneels; (penalty missed) Robin Schoonbrood

Jalan Besar Stadium, Kallang
Attendance: 5,826
Referee: Irwan Samsudin (Singapore)

== Team of the Tournament ==
Pos.	Player	Club	Appearance
GK	(Netherlands) Mike Meulenhof	PSV	1
DF	(Netherlands) Dante Rigo	PSV	1
DF	(England) Stefan Broccoli	Arsenal	1
DF	(Brazil) Renan Borges	Corinthians	1
DF	(Singapore) Danish Jefri	Singapore NFA U-15	1
MF	(Brazil) Matheus	Corinthians	1
MF	(Netherlands) Lennerd Daneels	PSV	1
MF	(Germany) DANIEL Chavero	Eintracht Frankfurt	1
MF	(Netherlands) Jaell Hattu	PSV	1
MF	(England) Harry Donovan	Arsenal	1
FW	(Singapore) Irfan Fandi	Singapore NFA U-16	1

== Goalscorers ==
6 goals

- (Brazil) Léo Jaba (Corinthians)

4 goals

- (Brazil) Matheus (Corinthians)

3 goals

- (Germany) Nils Herdt (Eintracht Frankfurt)
- (England) Adrian Matuschewski (Arsenal)

2 goals

- Irfan Fandi (Singapore)
- Andin Addie (Singapore)
- (England) Christopher Willock (Arsenal)
- (Germany) Marvin Diehl (Eintracht Frankfurt)
- (Netherlands) Matthias Verreth (PSV Eindhoven)

1 goal

- (Brazil) Rafael Mudesto (Corinthians)
- (Brazil) Wesley Duarte (Corinthians)
- (Brazil) Miullen (Corinthians)
- (Brazil) Fabricio Rodrigues (Corinthians)
- (Brazil) Leonardo dos Santos (Corinthians)
- (Brazil) Renan Areias (Corinthians)
- (England) Faiq Jerfri (Arsenal)
- (England) Harry Donovan (Arsenal)
- (England) Ahmed Ben Diack (Arsenal)
- (England) Tolaji Adeyinka Bola (Arsenal)
- (Germany) Kasyah Nasrullah Wallace (Eintracht Frankfurt)
- (Germany) Kaylen Miles Hinds (Eintracht Frankfurt)
- (Germany) Volkan Egri (Eintracht Frankfurt)
- (Netherlands) Leandro Fernandes (PSV Eindhoven)
- (Netherlands) Karim Bannani (PSV Eindhoven)
- (Netherlands) Lennerd Daneels (PSV Eindhoven)
- (Netherlands) Jaell Hattu (PSV Eindhoven)
- (Netherlands) Dante Rigo (PSV Eindhoven)
- Syukri Bashir (Singapore)
- Adam Hakeem (Singapore)
- Syafiq Irawan (Singapore)
- Lionel Tan (Singapore)
