= Jhonatan Garcia =

Brazilian footballer (born 2004)

Personal information
- Full name: Jhonatan Garcia da Silva
- Date of birth: 14 February 2004 (age 22)
- Place of birth: Arujá, Brazil
- Height: 1.77 m (5 ft 10 in)
- Position: Attacking midfielder

Team information
- Current team: Ferroviária
- Number: 14

Youth career
- 2021-2023: Palmeiras
- 2023-2024: Corinthians
- 2024-2025: Ferroviária

Senior career*
Years	Team	Apps	(Gls)
2025-	Ferroviária	4	(1)
- * Club domestic league appearances and goals as of 9 May 2026

Jhonatan Garcia da Silva (born 14 February 2004), known as Jhonatan Garcia, is a Brazilian professional footballer who plays as a attacking midfielder for Ferroviária.

== Career ==
Born in Arujá, in the state of São Paulo, Jhonatan began his footballing development in the renowned youth academy of Palmeiras, one of Brazil's most distinguished breeding grounds for young talent. In 2023, he transferred to a rival state. Corinthians youth team.

During his spell with the Alvinegro, he featured in five matches as a member of the squad that lifted the 2024 Copa São Paulo de Futebol Júnior and was among the reserves at the end of the championship against Cruzeiro.

Towards the end of 2024, Jhonatan completed a move to Associação Ferroviária de Esportes, the Araraquara-based club, where he gradually carved out a place in the squad selected for the following edition of the Copinha. Having been omitted from the matchday squad for the opening two rounds of the group stage, the midfielder made his Ferroviária debut from the substitutes bench in a 2–1 victory over Santos on matchday three, in a fixture staged at the Estádio Fonte Luminosa.

Jhonatan made his senior debut for Ferroviária later in the 2026 season, coming on from the substitutes bench in the 71st minute of a 2–1 victory over Inter de Limeira in the Campeonato Paulista Série A2.

== Career statistics ==
As of match played 9 May 2026

Appearances and goals by club, season and competition
Club	Season	League			State League		Cup		Continental		Other		Total	
Club	Season	Division	Apps	Goals	Apps	Goals	Apps	Goals	Apps	Goals	Apps	Goals	Apps	Goals
Ferroviária	2026	Série C	1	0	3	1	—		—		—		4	1
Career total			1	0	3	1	—		—		—		4	1

== Honours ==
Corinthians

- Copa São Paulo de Futebol Júnior: 2024
