= 2026 Copa São Paulo de Futebol Júnior =

56th edition of the Copa São Paulo de Futebol Júnior

Copinha Sicredi 2026

Tournament details
- Country: Brazil
- Dates: 2 – 25 January
- Teams: 128

Final positions
- Champions: Cruzeiro (2nd title)
- Runners-up: São Paulo

Tournament statistics
- Matches played: 255
- Goals scored: 706 (2.77 per match)
- Top goal scorer(s): Jhuan Nunes (Red Bull Bragantino); Paulinho (São Paulo) (6 goals each)

Awards
- Best player: Fernando (Cruzeiro)

The 2026 Copa São Paulo de Futebol Júnior (also known as Copinha Sicredi 2026 for sponsorship reasons), was the 56th edition of the Copa São Paulo de Futebol Júnior, a youth football competition, organized by the São Paulo Federation of Football (FPF).

One of the most traditional football competitions in Brazil, the 2026 edition took place between 2 and 25 January, being competed by 128 teams divided into 32 groups. The top two teams in each group advance to the next stage, which will be played in knockout matches. Therefore, the teams were reduced by half at each stage until the final.

São Paulo were the defending champions, and managed to reach the final of the competition for a second consecutive year, where they lost to Cruzeiro.

== Host cities ==
In the 2026 edition, over 30 cities will be hosting matches for the tournament.

Host cities in the state of São Paulo

== Group stage ==
On 25 November 2025, the FPF announced the groups and venues for the 2026 edition that will end on the anniversary of the city of São Paulo, 25 January.

=== Group 1 ===
- City: Santa Fé do Sul

Pos	Team	Pld	W	D	L	GF	GA	GD	Pts	Qualification
1	(Santa Catarina (state)) Chapecoense	3	2	1	0	7	3	+4	7	Qualified to the second round
2	(Bahia) Atlético de Alagoinhas	3	2	1	0	6	3	+3	7	Qualified to the second round
3	(Rio de Janeiro (state)) Volta Redonda	3	0	1	2	5	7	−2	1	
4	(São Paulo (state)) Santa Fé	3	0	1	2	1	6	−5	1	

Updated to match(es) played on unknown. Source: FPF
Rules for classification: 1) points; 2) wins; 3) goal difference; 4) goals for; 5) less red cards; 6) less yellow cards; 7) draw.

=== Group 2 ===
- City: Votuporanga

Pos	Team	Pld	W	D	L	GF	GA	GD	Pts	Qualification
1	(Rio Grande do Sul) Grêmio	3	2	1	0	11	1	+10	7	Qualified to the second round
2	(São Paulo (state)) Votuporanguense	3	2	1	0	6	2	+4	7	Qualified to the second round
3	(Sergipe) Falcon	3	1	0	2	3	6	−3	3	
4	(Acre (state)) Galvez	3	0	0	3	1	12	−11	0	

Updated to match(es) played on unknown. Source: FPF
Rules for classification: 1) points; 2) wins; 3) goal difference; 4) goals for; 5) less red cards; 6) less yellow cards; 7) draw.

=== Group 3 ===
- City: Tanabi

Pos	Team	Pld	W	D	L	GF	GA	GD	Pts	Qualification
1	Goiás	3	3	0	0	7	2	+5	9	Qualified to the second round
2	(Rio Grande do Norte) América de Natal	3	2	0	1	9	5	+4	6	Qualified to the second round
3	(São Paulo (state)) Tanabi	3	1	0	2	1	7	−6	3	
4	(Federal District (Brazil)) Sobradinho	3	0	0	3	3	6	−3	0	

Updated to match(es) played on unknown. Source: FPF
Rules for classification: 1) points; 2) wins; 3) goal difference; 4) goals for; 5) less red cards; 6) less yellow cards; 7) draw.

=== Group 4 ===
- City: Bálsamo

Pos	Team	Pld	W	D	L	GF	GA	GD	Pts	Qualification
1	(Pernambuco) Sport	3	2	1	0	6	2	+4	7	Qualified to the second round
2	(São Paulo (state)) Mirassol	3	2	0	1	3	4	−1	6	Qualified to the second round
3	(Espírito Santo) Forte	3	1	1	1	5	4	+1	4	
4	(São Paulo (state)) Linense	3	0	0	3	2	6	−4	0	

Updated to match(es) played on unknown. Source: FPF
Rules for classification: 1) points; 2) wins; 3) goal difference; 4) goals for; 5) less red cards; 6) less yellow cards; 7) draw.

=== Group 5 ===
- City: Araçatuba

Pos	Team	Pld	W	D	L	GF	GA	GD	Pts	Qualification
1	(Paraná (state)) Athletico Paranaense	3	2	1	0	4	2	+2	7	Qualified to the second round
2	(São Paulo (state)) Osasco Sporting	3	1	2	0	4	3	+1	5	Qualified to the second round
3	(Rio de Janeiro (state)) Maricá	3	1	1	1	4	3	+1	4	
4	(São Paulo (state)) Araçatuba FC	3	0	0	3	3	7	−4	0	

Updated to match(es) played on unknown. Source: FPF
Rules for classification: 1) points; 2) wins; 3) goal difference; 4) goals for; 5) less red cards; 6) less yellow cards; 7) draw.

=== Group 6 ===
- City: Presidente Prudente

Pos	Team	Pld	W	D	L	GF	GA	GD	Pts	Qualification
1	(São Paulo (state)) Grêmio Prudente	3	3	0	0	8	2	+6	9	Qualified to the second round
2	Ceará	3	2	0	1	6	2	+4	6	Qualified to the second round
3	(Sergipe) Olímpico	3	1	0	2	1	6	−5	3	
4	(Pará) Carajás	3	0	0	3	1	6	−5	0	

Updated to match(es) played on unknown. Source: FPF
Rules for classification: 1) points; 2) wins; 3) goal difference; 4) goals for; 5) less red cards; 6) less yellow cards; 7) draw.

=== Group 7 ===
- City: Assis

Pos	Team	Pld	W	D	L	GF	GA	GD	Pts	Qualification
1	(Minas Gerais) Athletic	3	3	0	0	10	0	+10	9	Qualified to the second round
2	(São Paulo (state)) Guarani	3	2	0	1	7	1	+6	6	Qualified to the second round
3	(São Paulo (state)) Assisense	3	1	0	2	2	9	−7	3	
4	(Mato Grosso do Sul) Naviraiense	3	0	0	3	0	9	−9	0	

Updated to match(es) played on unknown. Source: FPF
Rules for classification: 1) points; 2) wins; 3) goal difference; 4) goals for; 5) less red cards; 6) less yellow cards; 7) draw.

=== Group 8 ===
- City: Jaú

Pos	Team	Pld	W	D	L	GF	GA	GD	Pts	Qualification
1	(São Paulo (state)) Corinthians	3	2	1	0	4	2	+2	7	Qualified to the second round
2	(São Paulo (state)) XV de Jaú	3	2	0	1	6	5	+1	6	Qualified to the second round
3	(Mato Grosso) Luverdense	3	1	1	1	2	2	0	4	
4	(Goiás) Trindade	3	0	0	3	1	4	−3	0	

Updated to match(es) played on unknown. Source: FPF
Rules for classification: 1) points; 2) wins; 3) goal difference; 4) goals for; 5) less red cards; 6) less yellow cards; 7) draw.

=== Group 9 ===
- City: São José do Rio Preto

Pos	Team	Pld	W	D	L	GF	GA	GD	Pts	Qualification
1	Bahia	3	2	1	0	9	0	+9	7	Qualified to the second round
2	(São Paulo (state)) Inter de Limeira	3	1	1	1	3	6	−3	4	Qualified to the second round
3	(Alagoas) CSA	3	0	2	1	1	3	−2	2	
4	(São Paulo (state)) América	3	0	2	1	0	4	−4	2	

Updated to match(es) played on unknown. Source: FPF
Rules for classification: 1) points; 2) wins; 3) goal difference; 4) goals for; 5) less red cards; 6) less yellow cards; 7) draw.

=== Group 10 ===
- City: Ribeirão Preto

Pos	Team	Pld	W	D	L	GF	GA	GD	Pts	Qualification
1	(Minas Gerais) América Mineiro	3	3	0	0	9	1	+8	9	Qualified to the second round
2	(Piauí) Atlético Piauiense	3	2	0	1	7	3	+4	6	Qualified to the second round
3	(São Paulo (state)) Comercial	3	1	0	2	3	5	−2	3	
4	(São Paulo (state)) Noroeste	3	0	0	3	1	11	−10	0	

Updated to match(es) played on unknown. Source: FPF
Rules for classification: 1) points; 2) wins; 3) goal difference; 4) goals for; 5) less red cards; 6) less yellow cards; 7) draw.

=== Group 11 ===
- City: Brodowski

Pos	Team	Pld	W	D	L	GF	GA	GD	Pts	Qualification
1	(São Paulo (state)) Botafogo	3	3	0	0	7	2	+5	9	Qualified to the second round
2	(Pará) Tuna Luso	3	0	2	1	1	2	−1	2	Qualified to the second round
3	(Pernambuco) Santa Cruz	3	0	2	1	2	4	−2	2	
4	(São Paulo (state)) Bandeirante de Brodowski	3	0	2	1	1	3	−2	2	

Updated to match(es) played on unknown. Source: FPF
Rules for classification: 1) points; 2) wins; 3) goal difference; 4) goals for; 5) less red cards; 6) less yellow cards; 7) draw.

=== Group 12 ===
- City: Cravinhos

Pos	Team	Pld	W	D	L	GF	GA	GD	Pts	Qualification
1	(Goiás) Guanabara City	3	2	1	0	7	2	+5	7	Qualified to the second round
2	(Rio de Janeiro (state)) Vasco da Gama	3	2	0	1	6	4	+2	6	Qualified to the second round
3	(São Paulo (state)) Velo Clube	3	0	2	1	3	5	−2	2	
4	(São Paulo (state)) I9	3	0	1	2	3	8	−5	1	

Updated to match(es) played on unknown. Source: FPF
Rules for classification: 1) points; 2) wins; 3) goal difference; 4) goals for; 5) less red cards; 6) less yellow cards; 7) draw.

=== Group 13 ===
- City: Franca

Pos	Team	Pld	W	D	L	GF	GA	GD	Pts	Qualification
1	(Minas Gerais) Cruzeiro	3	3	0	0	5	0	+5	9	Qualified to the second round
2	(São Paulo (state)) Francana	3	2	0	1	2	1	+1	6	Qualified to the second round
3	(Santa Catarina (state)) Barra	3	1	0	2	2	5	−3	3	
4	(Paraíba) Esporte de Patos	3	0	0	3	1	4	−3	0	

Updated to match(es) played on unknown. Source: FPF
Rules for classification: 1) points; 2) wins; 3) goal difference; 4) goals for; 5) less red cards; 6) less yellow cards; 7) draw.

=== Group 14 ===
- City: Patrocínio Paulista

Pos	Team	Pld	W	D	L	GF	GA	GD	Pts	Qualification
1	(São Paulo (state)) Ponte Preta	3	3	0	0	8	3	+5	9	Qualified to the second round
2	(São Paulo (state)) Meia Noite	3	1	1	1	2	2	0	4	Qualified to the second round
3	(Paraná (state)) Coritiba	3	1	0	2	11	6	+5	3	
4	(Roraima) Real	3	0	1	2	1	11	−10	1	

Updated to match(es) played on unknown. Source: FPF
Rules for classification: 1) points; 2) wins; 3) goal difference; 4) goals for; 5) less red cards; 6) less yellow cards; 7) draw.

=== Group 15 ===
- City: Araraquara

Pos	Team	Pld	W	D	L	GF	GA	GD	Pts	Qualification
1	(São Paulo (state)) Ferroviária	3	2	1	0	3	1	+2	7	Qualified to the second round
2	(Mato Grosso) Cuiabá	3	1	2	0	3	1	+2	5	Qualified to the second round
3	(Rio de Janeiro (state)) America	3	1	0	2	2	4	−2	3	
4	(Ceará) Quixadá	3	0	1	2	1	3	−2	1	

Updated to match(es) played on unknown. Source: FPF
Rules for classification: 1) points; 2) wins; 3) goal difference; 4) goals for; 5) less red cards; 6) less yellow cards; 7) draw.

=== Group 16 ===
- City: São Carlos

Pos	Team	Pld	W	D	L	GF	GA	GD	Pts	Qualification
1	(São Paulo (state)) Santos	3	3	0	0	7	2	+5	9	Qualified to the second round
2	(Federal District (Brazil)) Real Brasília	3	1	1	1	4	4	0	4	Qualified to the second round
3	(São Paulo (state)) São-Carlense	3	0	2	1	3	7	−4	2	
4	(Rondônia) União Cacoalense	3	0	1	2	3	7	−4	1	

Updated to match(es) played on unknown. Source: FPF
Rules for classification: 1) points; 2) wins; 3) goal difference; 4) goals for; 5) less red cards; 6) less yellow cards; 7) draw.

=== Group 17 ===
- City: Cosmópolis

Pos	Team	Pld	W	D	L	GF	GA	GD	Pts	Qualification
1	(São Paulo (state)) Red Bull Bragantino	3	3	0	0	12	2	+10	9	Qualified to the second round
2	(Santa Catarina (state)) Figueirense	3	1	1	1	5	8	−3	4	Qualified to the second round
3	(Maranhão) São Luís FC	3	0	2	1	1	3	−2	2	
4	(São Paulo (state)) Cosmopolitano	3	0	1	2	2	7	−5	1	

Updated to match(es) played on unknown. Source: FPF
Rules for classification: 1) points; 2) wins; 3) goal difference; 4) goals for; 5) less red cards; 6) less yellow cards; 7) draw.

=== Group 18 ===
- City: Tietê

Pos	Team	Pld	W	D	L	GF	GA	GD	Pts	Qualification
1	(Federal District (Brazil)) Canaã	3	2	0	1	7	5	+2	6	Qualified to the second round
2	(São Paulo (state)) Comercial do Tietê	3	2	0	1	5	5	0	6	Qualified to the second round
3	(Santa Catarina (state)) Criciúma	3	1	0	2	4	4	0	3	
4	(São Paulo (state)) XV de Piracicaba	3	1	0	2	2	4	−2	3	

Updated to match(es) played on unknown. Source: FPF
Rules for classification: 1) points; 2) wins; 3) goal difference; 4) goals for; 5) less red cards; 6) less yellow cards; 7) draw.

=== Group 19 ===
- City: Sorocaba

Pos	Team	Pld	W	D	L	GF	GA	GD	Pts	Qualification
1	(São Paulo (state)) São Paulo	3	3	0	0	10	1	+9	9	Qualified to the second round
2	(Amapá) Independente	3	1	1	1	1	2	−1	4	Qualified to the second round
3	(Sergipe) Maruinense	3	1	0	2	1	3	−2	3	
4	(São Paulo (state)) Real Soccer	3	0	1	2	1	7	−6	1	

Updated to match(es) played on unknown. Source: FPF
Rules for classification: 1) points; 2) wins; 3) goal difference; 4) goals for; 5) less red cards; 6) less yellow cards; 7) draw.

=== Group 20 ===
- City: Paulínia

Pos	Team	Pld	W	D	L	GF	GA	GD	Pts	Qualification
1	(Paraná (state)) Operário Ferroviário	3	2	1	0	3	1	+2	7	Qualified to the second round
2	(São Paulo (state)) Portuguesa	3	2	0	1	4	2	+2	6	Qualified to the second round
3	(Goiás) Vila Nova	3	0	2	1	2	3	−1	2	
4	(São Paulo (state)) Paulínia Universitário	3	0	1	2	2	5	−3	1	

Updated to match(es) played on unknown. Source: FPF
Rules for classification: 1) points; 2) wins; 3) goal difference; 4) goals for; 5) less red cards; 6) less yellow cards; 7) draw.

=== Group 21 ===
- City: Guaratinguetá

Pos	Team	Pld	W	D	L	GF	GA	GD	Pts	Qualification
1	(Rio Grande do Sul) Juventude	11	2	1	8	0	0	0	7	Qualified to the second round
2	(São Paulo (state)) São José	3	2	1	0	3	1	+2	7	Qualified to the second round
3	(Amazonas (Brazilian state)) Nacional	3	1	0	2	2	4	−2	3	
4	(São Paulo (state)) Atlético Guaratinguetá	3	0	0	3	1	9	−8	0	

Updated to match(es) played on unknown. Source: FPF
Rules for classification: 1) points; 2) wins; 3) goal difference; 4) goals for; 5) less red cards; 6) less yellow cards; 7) draw.

=== Group 22 ===
- City: Taubaté

Pos	Team	Pld	W	D	L	GF	GA	GD	Pts	Qualification
1	(Rio de Janeiro (state)) Botafogo	3	3	0	0	7	0	+7	9	Qualified to the second round
2	(Pará) Águia de Marabá	3	2	0	1	3	2	+1	6	Qualified to the second round
3	(São Paulo (state)) Taubaté	3	1	0	2	3	7	−4	3	
4	(Bahia) Estrela de Março	3	0	0	3	0	4	−4	0	

Updated to match(es) played on unknown. Source: FPF
Rules for classification: 1) points; 2) wins; 3) goal difference; 4) goals for; 5) less red cards; 6) less yellow cards; 7) draw.

=== Group 23 ===
- City: Mogi das Cruzes

Pos	Team	Pld	W	D	L	GF	GA	GD	Pts	Qualification
1	(Ceará) Fortaleza	3	3	0	0	10	3	+7	9	Qualified to the second round
2	(São Paulo (state)) União Mogi	3	2	0	1	4	5	−1	6	Qualified to the second round
3	(Paraíba) Confiança de Sapé	3	1	0	2	4	6	−2	3	
4	(São Paulo (state)) Centro Olímpico	3	0	0	3	0	4	−4	0	

Updated to match(es) played on unknown. Source: FPF
Rules for classification: 1) points; 2) wins; 3) goal difference; 4) goals for; 5) less red cards; 6) less yellow cards; 7) draw.

=== Group 24 ===
- City: Itaquaquecetuba

Pos	Team	Pld	W	D	L	GF	GA	GD	Pts	Qualification
1	(São Paulo (state)) Itaquaquecetuba AC	3	2	1	0	3	1	+2	7	Qualified to the second round
2	(São Paulo (state)) Novorizontino	3	1	2	0	4	2	+2	5	Qualified to the second round
3	(Pernambuco) Náutico	3	1	0	2	3	4	−1	3	
4	(Maranhão) Juventude Samas	3	0	1	2	4	7	−3	1	

Updated to match(es) played on unknown. Source: FPF
Rules for classification: 1) points; 2) wins; 3) goal difference; 4) goals for; 5) less red cards; 6) less yellow cards; 7) draw.

=== Group 25 ===
- City: Santana de Parnaíba

Pos	Team	Pld	W	D	L	GF	GA	GD	Pts	Qualification
1	(Rio de Janeiro (state)) Fluminense	3	3	0	0	5	1	+4	9	Qualified to the second round
2	(São Paulo (state)) Água Santa	3	1	1	1	5	6	−1	4	Qualified to the second round
3	(Federal District (Brazil)) Brasiliense	3	1	0	2	2	3	−1	3	
4	(São Paulo (state)) Sfera	3	0	1	2	4	6	−2	1	

Updated to match(es) played on unknown. Source: FPF
Rules for classification: 1) points; 2) wins; 3) goal difference; 4) goals for; 5) less red cards; 6) less yellow cards; 7) draw.

=== Group 26 ===
- City: Embu das Artes

Pos	Team	Pld	W	D	L	GF	GA	GD	Pts	Qualification
1	(São Paulo (state)) Ituano	3	3	0	0	8	2	+6	9	Qualified to the second round
2	(São Paulo (state)) Referência	3	1	1	1	4	5	−1	4	Qualified to the second round
3	(Mato Grosso do Sul) Ivinhema	3	0	0	3	2	8	−6	0	
4	(Rio Grande do Sul) Real	3	1	1	1	5	4	+1	4	

Updated to match(es) played on unknown. Source: FPF
Rules for classification: 1) points; 2) wins; 3) goal difference; 4) goals for; 5) less red cards; 6) less yellow cards; 7) draw.

=== Group 27 ===
- City: Barueri

Pos	Team	Pld	W	D	L	GF	GA	GD	Pts	Qualification
1	(São Paulo (state)) Palmeiras	3	3	0	0	16	2	+14	9	Qualified to the second round
2	Monte Roraima	3	2	0	1	8	7	+1	6	Qualified to the second round
3	(Pará) Remo	3	1	0	2	3	6	−3	3	
4	(Tocantins) Batalhão	3	0	0	3	2	14	−12	0	

Updated to match(es) played on unknown. Source: FPF
Rules for classification: 1) points; 2) wins; 3) goal difference; 4) goals for; 5) less red cards; 6) less yellow cards; 7) draw.

=== Group 28 ===
- City: Guarulhos

Pos	Team	Pld	W	D	L	GF	GA	GD	Pts	Qualification
1	(São Paulo (state)) Flamengo	3	2	1	0	2	0	+2	7	Qualified to the second round
2	(Bahia) Vitória	3	1	1	1	4	3	+1	4	Qualified to the second round
3	(São Paulo (state)) Capivariano	3	0	3	0	5	5	0	3	
4	(Espírito Santo) Rio Branco	3	0	1	2	3	6	−3	1	

Updated to match(es) played on unknown. Source: FPF
Rules for classification: 1) points; 2) wins; 3) goal difference; 4) goals for; 5) less red cards; 6) less yellow cards; 7) draw.

=== Group 29 ===
- City: Osasco

Pos	Team	Pld	W	D	L	GF	GA	GD	Pts	Qualification
1	(São Paulo (state)) Audax	3	2	1	0	10	1	+9	7	Qualified to the second round
2	(Minas Gerais) Atlético Mineiro	3	2	0	1	7	5	+2	6	Qualified to the second round
3	(Rio Grande do Norte) QFC	3	0	2	1	3	6	−3	2	
4	(Mato Grosso) União Rondonópolis	3	0	1	2	4	12	−8	1	

Updated to match(es) played on unknown. Source: FPF
Rules for classification: 1) points; 2) wins; 3) goal difference; 4) goals for; 5) less red cards; 6) less yellow cards; 7) draw.

=== Group 30 ===
- City: São Paulo (Ibrachina)

Pos	Team	Pld	W	D	L	GF	GA	GD	Pts	Qualification
1	(São Paulo (state)) Ibrachina	3	2	1	0	8	2	+6	7	Qualified to the second round
2	(São Paulo (state)) Santo André	3	1	2	0	5	2	+3	5	Qualified to the second round
3	(Rio de Janeiro (state)) Bangu	3	0	2	1	2	3	−1	2	
4	(Ceará) Ferroviário	3	0	1	2	0	8	−8	1	

Updated to match(es) played on unknown. Source: FPF
Rules for classification: 1) points; 2) wins; 3) goal difference; 4) goals for; 5) less red cards; 6) less yellow cards; 7) draw.

=== Group 31 ===
- City: São Paulo (Juventus)

Pos	Team	Pld	W	D	L	GF	GA	GD	Pts	Qualification
1	(Pernambuco) Retrô	3	2	1	0	5	2	+3	7	Qualified to the second round
2	(São Paulo (state)) Juventus	3	1	2	0	5	3	+2	5	Qualified to the second round
3	(Paraná (state)) FC Cascavel	3	1	1	1	9	6	+3	4	
4	(São Paulo (state)) São Bento	3	0	0	3	3	11	−8	0	

Updated to match(es) played on unknown. Source: FPF
Rules for classification: 1) points; 2) wins; 3) goal difference; 4) goals for; 5) less red cards; 6) less yellow cards; 7) draw.

=== Group 32 ===
- City: São Paulo (Nacional)

Pos	Team	Pld	W	D	L	GF	GA	GD	Pts	Qualification
1	(São Paulo (state)) Nacional	3	2	1	0	5	0	+5	7	Qualified to the second round
2	(Rio Grande do Sul) Internacional	3	1	1	1	3	3	0	4	Qualified to the second round
3	(Alagoas) CSE	3	1	0	2	1	5	−4	3	
4	(São Paulo (state)) Portuguesa Santista	3	0	2	1	0	1	−1	2	

Updated to match(es) played on unknown. Source: FPF
Rules for classification: 1) points; 2) wins; 3) goal difference; 4) goals for; 5) less red cards; 6) less yellow cards; 7) draw.

== Knockout rounds ==
=== Round dates ===
Round	Date
Round of 64	12–13 January
Round of 32	14–15 January
Round of 16	16–17 January
Quarter-finals	18–19 January
Semi-finals	21 January
Final	25 January 2026

=== Bracket ===
Round of 64
Chapecoense	2
Votuporanguense	1
Grêmio	3
Atlético de Alagoinhas	1
Goiás	0(1)
Mirassol (p)	0(3)
Sport	1(6)
América de Natal (p)	1(7)
Athletico Paranaense	1
Ceará	2
Grêmio Prudente	1
Osasco Sporting	0
Athletic	2(2)
XV de Jaú (p)	2(4)
Corinthians	1
Guarani	2
Bahia	2(4)
Atlético Piauiense (p)	2(5)
América Mineiro	2
Inter de Limeira	1
Botafogo-SP	1
Vasco	0
Guanabara City	1
Tuna Luso	0
Cruzeiro	3
Meia Noite	1
Ponte Preta (p)	1(5)
Francana	1(4)
Ferroviária	2
Real Brasília	0
Santos	1
Cuiabá	0
Red Bull Bragantino	3
Comercial do Tietê	0
Canaã-DF	1
Figueirense	0
São Paulo	2
Portuguesa	0
Operário Ferroviário	4
Independente-AP	0
Juventude (p)	1(5)
Águia de Marabá	1(4)
Botafogo	3
São José-SP	0
Fortaleza	2
Novorizontino	1
Itaquaquecetuba AC	2
União Mogi	1
Fluminense (p)	1(5)
Referência	1(3)
Ituano	3
Água Santa	1
Palmeiras (p)	3(3)
Vitória	3(2)
Flamengo-SP	1
Monte Roraima	0
Audax	0
Santo André	1
Ibrachina	3
Atlético Mineiro	1
Retrô	0
Internacional	4
Nacional-SP	2
Juventus-SP	0

Round of 32
Chapecoense	0
Grêmio	1
Mirassol	0
América de Natal	2
Ceará	3
Grêmio Prudente	1
XV de Jaú	1
Guarani	0
Atlético Piauiense (p)	0(4)
América Mineiro	0(3)
Botafogo-SP	0(3)
Guanabara City (p)	0(4)
Cruzeiro	3
Ponte Preta	0
Ferroviária	1
Santos	4
Red Bull Bragantino	5
Canaã-DF	1
São Paulo	5
Operário Ferroviário	1
Juventude	1
Botafogo	4
Fortaleza	1(3)
Itaquaquecetuba AC	1(4)
Fluminense	0
Ituano	2
Palmeiras (p)	1(13)
Flamengo-SP	1(12)
Santo André	1(3)
Ibrachina (p)	1(5)
Internacional (p)	2(8)
Nacional-SP	2(7)

Round of 16
Grêmio	4
América de Natal	1
Ceará	2
XV de Jaú	0
Atlético Piauiense	0(3)
Guanabara City	0(4)
Cruzeiro	3
Santos	1
Red Bull Bragantino	1(3)
São Paulo	1(5)
Botafogo	0(4)
Itaquaquecetuba AC	0(3)
Ituano	1
Palmeiras	3
Ibrachina	2
Internacional	1

Quarter-finals
Grêmio	3
Ceará	0
Guanabara City	0
Cruzeiro	3
São Paulo	3
Botafogo	1
Palmeiras	2(4)
Ibrachina	2(5)

Semi-finals
Grêmio	2
Cruzeiro	3
São Paulo	4
Ibrachina	1

Final
Cruzeiro	2
São Paulo	1
