= Copa São Paulo de Futebol Júnior =

- Organiser(s): FPF
- Founded: 1969
- Region: Brazil
- Teams: 128
- Current champions: Cruzeiro (2nd title)
- Most championships: Corinthians (11 titles)
- Broadcaster(s): Rede Globo; Rede Vida; SporTV; Eleven Sports
- 2026 Copa São Paulo de Futebol Júnior

The Copa São Paulo de Futebol Júnior (or São Paulo Youth Football Cup, in English), also known as Copa São Paulo de Juniores (São Paulo Youth Cup) and Copinha (Little Cup), is a cup competition played by Brazilian under-20 association football teams (until the 2006 edition, it was contested by under-21 teams), most of them from the state of São Paulo. It is organized by the Paulistan Football Federation and is considered one of the most traditional and important under-20 sport competitions in Brazil. Its final is usually held on January 25, the anniversary of São Paulo City's founding.

== Format ==
In the first stage, the 128 teams are divided in 32 groups. The top 2 of each group qualify to the knockout stage. The final is always played on 25 January, the date of the foundation of the city of São Paulo. All matches are played in the São Paulo state.

== List of champions ==
Copa São Paulo de Futebol Júnior winners
Final	Winner	Score	Runner-up	Venue
1969	Corinthians	1–0	Nacional	Centro Esportivo Vicente Ítalo Feola
1970	Corinthians	4–2	Palmeiras	Centro Esportivo Vicente Ítalo Feola
1971	Fluminense	4–4 (aet) (4–3 p)	Botafogo	Centro Educacional de Pirituba
1972	Nacional	2–1	Internacional	Estádio do Pacaembu
1973	Fluminense	2–0 (aet)	Corinthians	Estádio Parque São Jorge
1974	Internacional	2–1	Ponte Preta	Estádio do Pacaembu
1975	Atlético Mineiro	0–0 (4–3 p)	Ponte Preta	Estádio do Pacaembu
1976	Atlético Mineiro	1–0	Corinthians	Estádio Parque São Jorge
1977	Fluminense	2–1	Ponte Preta	Estádio do Morumbi
1978	Internacional	0–0 (5–4 p)	Corinthians	Estádio do Pacaembu
1979	Marília	2–1	Fluminense	Estádio do Canindé
1980	Internacional	3–0	Atlético Mineiro	Estádio do Pacaembu
1981	Ponte Preta	1–0	São Paulo	Estádio do Pacaembu
1982	Ponte Preta	2–1	Santos	Estádio do Pacaembu
1983	Atlético Mineiro	2–1	Botafogo (SP)	Estádio Palestra Itália
1984	Santos	2–1	Corinthians	Estádio do Canindé
1985	Juventus	1–0	Guarani	Estádio do Pacaembu
1986	Fluminense	2–0	Ponte Preta	Estádio do Pacaembu
1988	Nacional	3–0	América-SP	Estádio da Universidade de São Paulo
1989	Fluminense	1–0	Juventus	Estádio do Pacaembu
1990	Flamengo	1–0	Juventus	Estádio do Pacaembu
1991	Portuguesa	4–0	Grêmio	Estádio do Pacaembu
1992	Vasco da Gama	1–1 (5–3 p)	São Paulo	Estádio do Pacaembu
1993	São Paulo	4–3	Corinthians	Estádio do Pacaembu
1994	Guarani	1–1 (aet) (3–0 p)	São Paulo	Estádio do Pacaembu
1995	Corinthians	3–2 (aet)	Ponte Preta	Estádio do Canindé
1996	América-MG	2–1	Cruzeiro	Estádio do Pacaembu
1997	Lousano Paulista (Note: Currently named Paulista Futebol Clube)	1–1 (4–3 p)	Corinthians	Estádio do Canindé
1998	Internacional	1–1 (aet) (4–3 p)	Ponte Preta	Estádio do Morumbi
1999	Corinthians	1–0	Vasco da Gama	Estádio do Pacaembu
2000	São Paulo	2–1	Juventus	Estádio do Pacaembu
2001	Roma Barueri (Note: Currently named Grêmio Barueri Futebol)	4–4 (6–5 p)	São Paulo	Estádio do Pacaembu
2002	Portuguesa	1–0	Cruzeiro	Estádio do Canindé
2003	Santo André	2–2 (5–3 p)	Palmeiras	Estádio do Pacaembu
2004	Corinthians	2–0	São Paulo	Estádio do Pacaembu
2005	Corinthians	3–1	Nacional	Estádio do Pacaembu
2006	América-SP	0–0 (3–1 p)	Comercial	Estádio do Pacaembu
2007	Cruzeiro	1–1 (6–5 p)	São Paulo	Estádio do Pacaembu
2008	Figueirense	2–0	Rio Branco	Estádio Nicolau Alayon
2009	Corinthians	2–1	Atlético Paranaense	Estádio do Pacaembu
2010	São Paulo	1–1 (3–0 p)	Santos	Estádio do Pacaembu
2011	Flamengo	2–1	Bahia	Estádio do Pacaembu
2012	Corinthians	2–1	Fluminense	Estádio do Pacaembu
2013	Santos	3–1	Goiás	Estádio do Pacaembu
2014	Santos	2–1	Corinthians	Estádio do Pacaembu
2015	Corinthians	1–0	Botafogo (SP)	Estádio do Pacaembu
2016	Flamengo	2–2 (4–3 p)	Corinthians	Estádio do Pacaembu
2017	Corinthians	2–1	Batatais	Estádio do Pacaembu
2018	Flamengo	1–0	São Paulo	Estádio do Pacaembu
2019	São Paulo	2–2 (3–1 p)	Vasco da Gama	Estádio do Pacaembu
2020	Internacional	1–1 (3–1 p)	Grêmio	Estádio do Pacaembu
2022	Palmeiras	4–0	Santos	Allianz Parque
2023	Palmeiras	2–1	América (MG)	Estádio do Canindé
2024	Corinthians	1–0	Cruzeiro	Neo Química Arena
2025	São Paulo	3–2	Corinthians	Estadio do Pacaembu
2026	Cruzeiro	2–1	São Paulo	Estadio do Pacaembu

== Titles by team ==
Club	Titles	Runners-up	Finals played	Last title
(São Paulo (state)) Corinthians	11	9	20	2024
(São Paulo (state)) São Paulo	5	8	13	2025
(Rio de Janeiro (state)) Fluminense	5	2	7	1989
(Rio Grande do Sul) Internacional	5	1	6	2020
(Rio de Janeiro (state)) Flamengo	4	0	4	2018
(São Paulo (state)) Santos	3	3	6	2014
(Minas Gerais) Atlético Mineiro	3	1	4	1983
(Minas Gerais) Cruzeiro	2	3	5	2026
(São Paulo (state)) Ponte Preta	2	5	7	1982
(São Paulo (state)) Nacional	2	2	4	1988
(São Paulo (state)) Palmeiras	2	2	4	2023
(São Paulo (state)) Portuguesa	2	0	2	2002
(São Paulo (state)) Juventus	1	3	4	1985
(Rio de Janeiro (state)) Vasco	1	2	3	1992
(São Paulo (state)) Guarani	1	1	2	1994
(São Paulo (state)) América (SP)	1	1	2	2006
(Minas Gerais) América (MG)	1	1	2	1996
(Santa Catarina (state)) Figueirense	1	0	1	2008
(São Paulo (state)) Paulista de Jundiaí	1	0	1	1997
(São Paulo (state)) Marília	1	0	1	1979
(São Paulo (state)) Grêmio Barueri	1	0	1	2001
(São Paulo (state)) Santo André	1	0	1	2003
(São Paulo (state)) Botafogo (SP)	0	2	2	-
(Rio Grande do Sul) Grêmio	0	2	2	-
(Paraná (state)) Atlético Paranaense	0	1	1	-
Bahia	0	1	1	-
(Rio de Janeiro (state)) Botafogo	0	1	1	-
(São Paulo (state)) Comercial	0	1	1	-
(São Paulo (state)) Rio Branco	0	1	1	-
Goiás	0	1	1	-

== Titles by state ==
State	Titles	Runners-up	Finals played
São Paulo	32	40	72
Rio de Janeiro	10	4	14
Minas Gerais	6	5	11
Rio Grande do Sul	5	3	8
Santa Catarina	1	0	1
Bahia	0	1	1
Paraná	0	1	1
Goiás	0	1	1

== Individual records ==
Following is some of individual records of Copa São Paulo editions, year by year.

=== Topscorers ===
Edition	Player	Club	Goals
1969	Unknown		
1970	Unknown		
1971	Luizinho	Botafogo	12
1972	Altivo	América Mineiro	5
1973	Carlos Alberto	Corinthians	5
1974	Aílton	Campo Grande (RJ)	4
1974	Juarez Baiano	Cruzeiro	4
1974	Soares	Internacional	4
1975	Heleno	Atlético Mineiro	3
1976	José Célio	Atlético Mineiro	4
1977	Unknown		
1978	Osvaldo	Ponte Preta	3
1979	Luisinho	Fluminense	4
1980	Rogério Corrêa	Internacional	4
1981	Chicão	Ponte Preta	4
1981	Marquinhos	São Paulo	4
1981	Paulo Santos	Internacional	4
1981	Vidotti	Corinthians	4
1982	Chicão	Ponte Preta	8
1983	Lúvio	Grêmio	3
1983	Marcus Vinícius	Atlético Mineiro	3
1983	Silvinho	Santos	3
1983	Valmir	Ponte Preta	3
1984	Caio	Grêmio	3
1984	Joel	Ponte Preta	3
1984	Mauro	Santos	3
1984	Silas	São Paulo	3
1985	Paulo Leme	Santos	6
1986	Vágner	América (SP)	6
1988	Mil	Nacional (SP)	7
1989	Sílvio	Fluminense	4
1990	Djalminha	Flamengo	8
1990	Sinval	Portuguesa	8
1991	Sinval	Portuguesa	12
1992	Valdir	Vasco da Gama	8
1993	Edi	Matsubara	8
1993	Jardel	Vasco da Gama	8
1994	Agnaldo	Londrina	9
1994	Jamelli	São Paulo	9
1995	Dodô	São Paulo	5
1995	Fabinho	Corinthians	5
1995	Fábio Henrique	Ponte Preta	5
1995	Jajá	Botafogo (SP)	5
1996	Missinho	Cruzeiro	6
1997	Irani	Sport Recife	7
1997	Vitor	Vasco da Gama	7
1998	Fábio Júnior	Cruzeiro	9
1998	Manoel	Internacional	9
1999	Maciel	Capivariano	8
2000	Gaúcho	Juventus	9
2001	Rogerinho	Roma Barueri	6
2002	Léo Medeiros	Cruzeiro	6
2002	Rico	CSA	6
2003	Leandro Domingues	Vitória	6
2003	Waldison	Inter de Limeira	6
2004	Rodrigo Tiuí	Fluminense	7
2004	William	Palmeiras	7
2005	Borebi	Noroeste	9
2006	Luiz Henrique	Paulista	9
2007	Rafinha	São Bernardo FC	8
2008	Rafael Martins	Grêmio	8
2008	Tiago Luís	Santos	8
2008	Vinícius Ramos	Taboão da Serra	8
2009	Bernardo	Cruzeiro	9
2010	Lucas Gaúcho	São Paulo	9
2011	Dellatorre	Desportivo Brasil	7
2012	Valdívia	Rondonópolis	8
2013	Caio Dantas	Grêmio Audax	8
2013	Diego Ceará	Mogi Mirim	8
2013	Erik	Goiás	8
2014	Diego Cardoso	Santos	9
2014	Gustavo	Taboão da Serra	9
2014	Stéfano Yuri	Santos	9
2015	Gabriel Vasconcelos	Corinthians	8
2015	Isaac Prado	Botafogo (SP)	8
2015	Santiago	São Caetano	8
2016	Geovane Itinga	Bahia	8
2017	Carlinhos	Corinthians	11
2018	Brenner	Internacional	8
2018	Jonas Toró	São Paulo	8
2018	Luan Silva	Vitória	8
2018	Luís Henrique	Ferroviária	8
2018	Miullen	Londrina	8
2018	Richard	Internacional	8
2019	Gabriel Novaes	São Paulo	10
2020	Felipe Micael	Mirassol	10
2022	Figueiredo	Vasco da Gama	8
2022	Werik	Oeste	8
2023	Ruan Ribeiro	Palmeiras	9
2024	Jardiel	Grêmio	9
2025	Ryan Francisco	São Paulo	10
2026	Jhuan Nunes	Red Bull Bragantino	6
2026	Paulinho	São Paulo	6

=== Player of the Tournament ===
Following is the list with the award for best player in the competition:

Edition	Player	Club
1998	Fábio Pinto	Internacional
1999	Edu	Corinthians
2000	Fábio Simplício	São Paulo
2001	Renatinho	São Paulo
2002	Rafael Iotte	Portuguesa
2003	Vágner Love	Palmeiras
2004	Jô	Corinthians
2005	Thiago Neves	Paraná
2006	Keirrison	Coritiba
2007	Breno	São Paulo
2008	Paulo Henrique Ganso	Santos
2009	Santos	Atlético Paranaense
2010	Marcelinho	São Paulo
2011	Negueba	Flamengo
2012	Marcos Júnior	Fluminense
2013	Leandrinho	Santos
2014	Lucas Otávio	Santos
2015	Gabriel Jesus	Palmeiras
2016	Felipe Vizeu	Flamengo
2017	Pedrinho	Corinthians
2018	Liziero	São Paulo
2019	Antony	São Paulo
2020	Bruno Praxedes	Internacional
2022	Endrick	Palmeiras
2023	Kevin	Palmeiras
2024	Breno Bidon	Corinthians
2025	Ryan Francisco	São Paulo
2026	Fernando	Cruzeiro

=== Winning managers ===
Edition	Manager	Club
1969	Luizinho	Corinthians
1970	Luizinho	Corinthians
1971	Pinheiro	Fluminense
1972	José Romeiro	Nacional (SP)
1973	Pinheiro	Fluminense
1974	Marcos Eugênio	Internacional
1975	Barbatana	Atlético Mineiro
1976	Dawson Laviola	Atlético Mineiro
1977	Pinheiro	Fluminense
1978	Marcos Eugênio	Internacional
1979	Walter Zaparolli	Marília
1980	Abílio dos Reis	Internacional
1981	Milton dos Santos	Ponte Preta
1982	Milton dos Santos	Ponte Preta
1983	José Maria Pena	Atlético Mineiro
1984	Ernesto Marques	Santos
1985	Reinaldo Borracha	Juventus
1986	Antônio Ângelo	Fluminense
1988	Vinícios Cecconi	Nacional (SP)
1989	Sebastião Rocha	Fluminense
1990	Ernesto Paulo	Flamengo
1991	Écio Pasca	Portuguesa
1992	Gaúcho	Vasco da Gama
1993	Márcio Araújo	São Paulo
1994	Pupo Gimenez	Guarani
1995	Pupo Gimenez	Corinthians
1996	Ricardo Drubscky	América Mineiro
1997	Giba	Lousano Paulista
1998	Guto Ferreira	Internacional
1999	Roberto Brida	Corinthians
2000	Pita	São Paulo
2001	Marcelo Vilar	Roma Barueri
2002	Edu Marangon	Portuguesa
2003	Geime Rotta	Santo André
2004	Adaílton Ladeira	Corinthians
2005	Adaílton Ladeira	Corinthians
2006	Claudino Cândido	América de Rio Preto
2007	Enderson Moreira	Cruzeiro
2008	Rogério Micale	Figueirense
2009	Adaílton Ladeira	Corinthians
2010	Sérgio Baresi	São Paulo
2011	Paulo Henrique	Flamengo
2012	Narciso	Corinthians
2013	Claudinei Oliveira	Santos
2014	Pepinho	Santos
2015	Osmar Loss	Corinthians
2016	Zé Ricardo	Flamengo
2017	Osmar Loss	Corinthians
2018	Maurício Souza	Flamengo
2019	Orlando Ribeiro	São Paulo
2020	Fábio Matias	Internacional
2022	Paulo Victor Gomes	Palmeiras
2023	Paulo Victor Gomes	Palmeiras
2024	Danilo	Corinthians
2025	Allan Barcellos	São Paulo
2026	Mairon César	Cruzeiro

== Supercopa São Paulo de Futebol Júnior ==
The Supercopa São Paulo de Futebol Júnior was a tournament organized by the São Paulo Football Federation bringing together 16 teams that until then had been champions and runners-up of the Copa São Paulo de Futebol Júnior and played by Brazilian under-20 football teams.

It was held in 1994 and 1995.

=== List of Champions ===
Supercopa São Paulo de Futebol Júnior Winners
Final	Winner	Score	Runner-up	Venue
1994	Atlético Mineiro	1–0	Internacional	Estádio do Pacaembu
1995	Palmeiras	1–0 (g.g)	São Paulo	Estádio do Pacaembu

=== Titles by team ===
Club	Titles	Runners-up	Finals played	Last title
(São Paulo (state)) Palmeiras	1	0	1	1995
(Minas Gerais) Atlético Mineiro	1	0	1	1994
(São Paulo (state)) São Paulo	0	1	1	-
(Rio Grande do Sul) Internacional	0	1	1	-

=== Titles by state ===
State	Titles	Runners-up	Finals played
São Paulo	1	1	2
Minas Gerais	1	0	1
Rio Grande do Sul	0	1	1

== Copinha Feminina ==
Organized for the first time in December 2023 with 16 participating clubs, the women's version of the competition was held for the first time, for players under 20 years old. Flamengo became champions of the first edition by beating Botafogo.

=== List of Champions ===
Final	Winner	Score	Runner-up	Venue
2023	Flamengo	2–0	Botafogo	Estádio do Canindé
2024	Fluminense	0–0 (5–3 p)	Internacional	Estádio do Pacaembu
2025	Flamengo	6–0	Grêmio	Estádio do Canindé
