= Heli Carlos =

Brazilian football manager (born 1979)

Personal information
- Full name: Heli Carlos Natal de Oliveira
- Date of birth: 12 April 1979 (age 47)
- Place of birth: Formosa, Brazil

Team information
- Current team: Guanabara City (manager)

Managerial career
- Years: Team
- 2020–2020: Raça (manager)
- 2012–2020: Formosa (manager)
- 2002–2011: Formosa (football player)

Heli Carlos Natal de Oliveira (born 12 April 1979), known as Heli Carlos, is a Brazilian football manager and former player who manages Guanabara City.

== Managerial career ==
Born in Formosa, Goiás, Heli Carlos ended his career as a football player in Formosa in 2011 and remained at the club as a football supervisor.

In 2012, he had the first opportunity to lead the team as a coach, and even won his first title: the Taça João Saldanha.

In 2017 he became assistant coach and with the departure of the coach ended up taking over the team.

In 2020 the coach commanded Formosa in the First Division of the Campeonato Brasiliense. The team finished fourth in the competition.

Still in 2020, the coach would lead Raça in Third Division of Campeonato Goiano, but the competition ended up not happening due to the COVID-19 pandemic.

== Honours ==
- Taça João Saldanha (Formosa) 2012
