= Jaëll =

Jaëll is a surname. Notable people with this surname include:

- Alfred Jaëll (1832–1882), Austrian pianist
- Marie Jaëll (1846–1925), French pianist
- Jaëll Hattu (born 1998), Dutch professional footballer

== See also ==
- Jael, a woman mentioned in the Book of Judges in the Hebrew Bible
