= Lion City Cup =

- Organiser(s): Football Association of Singapore
- Founded: 1977; 49 years ago
- Region: Singapore
- Teams: 4-14 (different years)
- Current champions: Philippines U16 (boys); South Korea U16 (girls)
- Most championships: Football Association of Singapore (6 Wins)

The Lion City Cup is a youth football tournament for boys. It was founded in 1977 by then Football Association of Singapore chairman Nadesan Ganesan, who organized the only Under-16 football tournament in the world, following the recommendation of FIFA's then secretary-general, Sepp Blatter, who was in Singapore for the 1982 Lion City Cup. The Cup has been credited with inspiring the creation of the 1985 FIFA U-16 World Championship hosted in China at FIFA's request.

== History ==
The Lion City Cup was first introduced in 1977, and the tournament was aimed at nurturing and developing youth footballing talents in Singapore. When the tournament was first started in 1977, it first featured youth teams from Malaysian state representative sides, given that there was keen interest in the Malaysia League and Cup competitions then. That year, a young Philip Yeo [arguably the most gifted footballer Singapore has ever known] who was the captain, helped Singapore emerge as champions after thrashing Pahang 5-0, in the finals played on 18 December 1977 at the old National Stadium. While the tournament was a regular annual affair from 1977 to 1982, the competition was discontinued from 1983 to 1989 because in 1982, the momentum of the event attracted the interest of FIFA, paving the way for the first FIFA U-16 World Cup in 1985. As a consequence, it became impracticable to hold the Lion City Cup with the same international caliber of invitees, and the competition was not held again until 1990 when it was revived in its original form and was an annual affair from that year until 2001, and then it went on a hiatus again for two years.

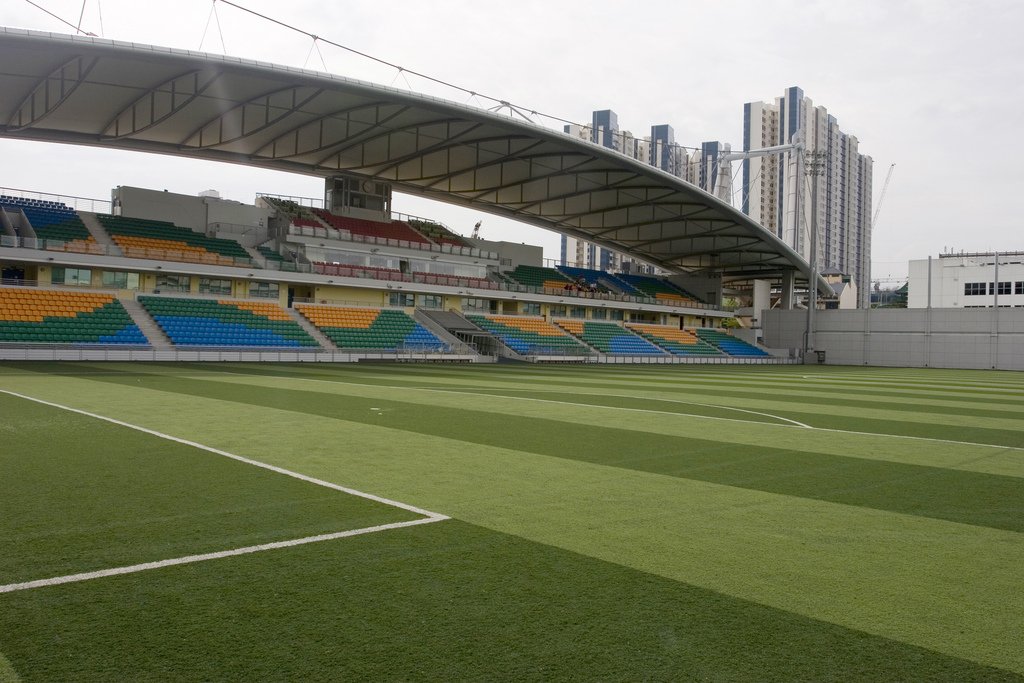
The tournament has been held at the Jalan Besar Stadium in Kallang as of now.

=== Multiple returns & hiatuses ===
In 2004, it came back to life for three years and then was not held in 2007.

In 2008, Thailand U-17 beat the UAE U-17 in the final and the event was scrapped for another two years.

Then another 3 continuous years of competitions from 2011 to 2013, before being abolished in 2014 due to lack of sponsors.

The event returned in 2015 only to be discontinued for the next seven years.

=== 2023 comeback ===
The Lion City Cup returned for the 27th edition as an Under-15 tournament in 2023 after a seven-year hiatus. The 2023 edition was held on the 1st and 3rd September 2023, and featured regional sides Selangor (Malaysia), BG Pathum United (Thailand), Borneo Samarinda (Indonesia). Singapore’s representative was the National Development Centre (NDC) Under-15 team. This marked the first time that BG Pathum and Borneo F.C. participated in the tournament.

=== 2024 ===
The Lion City Cup returned for the 28th edition in 2024 as an U16 tournament. Held on 4 and 6 October 2024, it featured the 2023 holders, BG Pathum United (Thailand) and 2 other regional sides. Making their tournament debuts were Johor Darul Ta'zim F.C. (Malaysia) & Tokyo Verdy (Japan). Singapore’s representative was the National Under-16 team.

== Winners ==
Edition	Year	Final			Third place game			Total teams
Edition	Year	Champions	Score	Runners-up	Third place	Score	Fourth place	Total teams
1st	1977	Singapore U-16	5–0	(Malaysia) Pahang U-16	(Malaysia) Kelantan U-16	2–0	(Malaysia) Penang U-16	8
2nd	1978 (Note: Singapore 'C' replaced Thailand U-16 which withdrew from the tournament)	Singapore 'A'	3–0	(Malaysia) Selangor U-16	Singapore 'B'	2–1	Singapore 'C'	12
3rd	1979 (Note: Indonesia was represented with players from Jakarta.)	(Iraq) Iraq U-16	3–1	Australia U-16	Thailand U-16	4–1	Singapore 'A'	14
4th	1980	Bahrain U-16	1–0	Saudi Arabia U-16	South Korea U-16	2–0	Thailand U-16	12
5th	1981	South Korea U-16	2–1	Bahrain U-16	Thailand U-16	3–1	Japan U-16	11
6th	1982	Thailand U-16	1–0	Saudi Arabia U-16	Japan U-16	1–0	Qatar U-16	9
Competition not held from 1983 to 1989
7th	1990	Singapore U-15	7–1	(Malaysia) Terengganu U-16	(Malaysia) Kuala Lumpur U-16	1–1	(Malaysia) Perak U-16	6
8th	1991	Myanmar U-16	2–0	Singapore U-16	Hong Kong U-16	2–1	(Malaysia) Selangor U-16	8
9th	1992	Indonesia U-16	0–0 (a.e.t.) (5–4 p)	(Malaysia) Kuala Lumpur U-16	Singapore U-16	1–0	(Malaysia) Melaka U-16	8
10th	1993	Indonesia U-16	4–1	(Australia) Western Australia	(Malaysia) Pahang U-16	5–2	(Malaysia) Kuala Lumpur U-16	8
11th	1994	(Australia) Perth Kangaroos	3–2	(Malaysia) Kuala Lumpur U-16	Hong Kong U-16	2–1	(Malaysia) Pahang U-16	8
12th	1995	Singapore 'A'	1–0	Hong Kong U-16	(Australia) Perth Kangaroos	3–1	(Sweden) AIK Stockholm U-16	8
13th	1996	South Korea U-16	4–0	(Sweden) AIK Stockholm U-16	(Australia) Perth Glory (Note: Perth Kangaroos were disbanded after the 1995 season and went back to their native country donning a new entry as Perth Glory)	2–0	Singapore U-16	8
14th	1997	(Sweden) AIK Stockholm U-16	3–2	(Australia) Perth Glory U-16	Hong Kong U-16	0–0 (a.e.t.) (5–4 p)	Singapore 'A'	8
15th	1998	India U-16	3–1	(Australia) Perth Glory U-16	Singapore 'A'	6–5	(Malaysia) Pahang U-16	8
16th	1999	India U-16	2–0	(Australia) Perth Glory U-16	Singapore 'B'	1–2	Cambodia U-16	8
17th	2000	(United States) Olympia Athletic	3–0	(Australia) Perth Glory U-16	Singapore U-16	2–1	(China) Beijing Guoan U-16	6
18th	2001	(Denmark) Lyngby BK	6–0	(Hungary) St Stephen's	(Japan) Wakayama U-16	5–4	Singapore U-16	4
Competition not held from 2002 to 2003
19th	2004	Singapore U-17	4–0	Hong Kong U-17	Malaysia U-17 and (Australia) Perth Glory U-17			5
20th	2005	Malaysia U-18	2–2 (a.e.t.) (4–2 p)	Singapore U-18	(Sweden) AIK Stockholm U-18	2–2 (a.e.t.) (4–3 p)	(Australia) Football West	10
21st	2006	Singapore U-18	0–0 (a.e.t.) (7–6 p)	Hong Kong U-18	Third place match not held			7
Competition not held in 2007
22nd	2008	Thailand U-17	1–1 (a.e.t.) (4–3 p)	(United Arab Emirates) UAE U-17	Australia U-16	3–1	Uzbekistan U-17	8
Competition not held from 2009 to 2010
23rd	2011	(Brazil) Flamengo U-15	0–0 (a.e.t.) (4–3 p)	Singapore U-16	Singapore U-15	4–0	(Italy) Singapore U-15	6
24th	2012	(Netherlands) Ajax U-16	4–1	Singapore U-16	(England) Manchester City U-16	1–3	(Brazil) Vasco Da Gama U-16	6
25th	2013	(Brazil) Corinthians U-15	1–1 (a.e.t.) (5–3 p)	(Netherlands) PSV U-15	(Germany) Eintracht Frankfurt U-15	3–2	(England) Arsenal U-16	6
26th	2015	(England) Tottenham Hotspurs U-15	4–0	(England) Liverpool U-15	Singapore U-16	3–2	Singapore U-15	4
Competition not held from 2015 to 2022
27th	2023	(Thailand) BG Pathum United U-15 (Note: BG Pathum United side which won Lion City Cup was their third tier U15 team.)	1–1 (a.e.t.) (4–3 p)	Singapore NDC U-15 (Note: FAS sent a team from the National Development Centre (NDU) to participate in the tournament.)	(Malaysia) Selangor U-15	2–1	(Indonesia) Borneo Samarinda U-15	4
28th	2024	(Japan) Tokyo Verdy FC	4–1	(Thailand) BG Pathum United	(Malaysia) Johor Darul Ta'zim	5–1	Singapore U-16	4
29th	2025 (Note: Single-round robin format was used in the 2025 edition.)	Philippines U-16	—	Singapore U-16	Hong Kong U-16	—	Cambodia U-16	4

== Notable overseas players ==
List of footballers that went on to play in Europe's top five leagues or represent their country at the FIFA World Cup

- (Brazil) Matheus Pereira
- (Brunei) Faiq Bolkiah (nephew of the Sultan of Brunei, Hassanal Bolkiah)
- (England) Jonjoe Kenny
- (England) Curtis Jones
- (England) Oliver Skipp
- (England) Ryan Ledson
- (England) Joseph Willock
- (England) Brandon Austin
- (Germany) Lukas Nmecha
- (Morocco) Noussair Mazraoui (represented Morocco at the 2022 FIFA World Cup in Qatar)
- (Netherlands) Donny van de Beek
- (Portugal) Rúben Neves (represented Portugal at the 2022 FIFA World Cup in Qatar)
- (Wales) David Brooks
- (Wales) Neco Williams (represented Wales at the 2022 FIFA World Cup in Qatar)
