= Hattu =

Hattu is a Moluccan surname. Notable people with the surname include:

- Ferril Hattu (born 1962), Indonesian footballer
- Jaëll Hattu (born 1998), Dutch footballer
