= Faiq Bolkiah =

Bruneian footballer (born 1998)

Personal information
- Full name: Faiq Jefri Bolkiah
- Date of birth: 9 May 1998 (age 28)
- Place of birth: Los Angeles, United States
- Height: 1.76 m (5 ft 9 in)
- Position: Winger

Youth career
- 2006–2009: AFC Newbury
- 2009–2013: Southampton
- 2014–2016: Chelsea
- 2016–2020: Leicester City

Senior career*
Years	Team	Apps	(Gls)
2020–2021	Marítimo	2	(0)
2021	Marítimo B	6	(0)
2021–2023	Chonburi	32	(2)
2023–2026	Ratchaburi	23	(2)

International career
2013	Brunei U19	5	(1)
2018	Brunei U21	3	(0)
2015–2019	Brunei U23	14	(1)
2016–2018	Brunei	6	(1)
- * Club domestic league appearances and goals as of 24 August 2026

Faiq Jefri Bolkiah (born 9 May 1998) is a member of the Brunei royal family and professional footballer who plays as a winger. Born in the United States, he has played as the captain of the Brunei national team.

== Club career ==
=== Early career ===
In 2009, whilst at AFC Newbury, Bolkiah signed a one-year deal with the Southampton academy. He was with Southampton until at least December 2011. In 2014, Bolkiah signed a two-year youth contract with Chelsea of the Premier League after previously training with Reading and trialing with Arsenal. During his time with Arsenal, Bolkiah competed in the 2013 Lion City Cup against Corinthians, Eintracht Frankfurt, PSV, and a Singapore youth selection. He scored a goal in a 2–1 victory over the team from Singapore. With his contract with Chelsea set to expire in summer 2016, he left the team in December 2015. After a trial with Stoke City, he signed for Leicester City on a reported three-year professional contract in March 2016. He further signed a one-year extension to his deal in the summer of 2019.

=== Marítimo ===
On 23 September 2020, Bolkiah signed on a free transfer to Marítimo of Portugal's Primeira Liga. Three months later, he made his debut with under-23 team in a 3–3 home draw against Sporting CP U23 after being named in the starting line-up. Forty-five days later, he was named as a Marítimo substitute for the first time in a league match against Sporting CP.

On 11 April 2021, he made his senior debut for Marítimo B, coming on as a substitute in a 2–1 win over Gondomar.

=== Chonburi ===
In December 2021, Bolkiah joined Thai League 1 outift, Chonburi ahead of the second half of the 2021–22 season. He became the first-ever Bruneian to join a Thai club. He scored his first goal for the club in a 1–0 victory against Port on 25 November 2022. He announced his departure from the club on 14 May 2023, after the conclusion of the 2022–23 Thai League 1.

=== Ratchaburi ===
On 16 June 2023, Ratchaburi announced on their official Facebook page the signing of Faiq for the upcoming 2023–24 Thai League 1 season. He made his debut against Nakhon Pathom United on 19 August 2023 as a substitute in a 0–1 loss. A month later, he scored his first goal for Ratchaburi in a 6–1 win at home against Police Tero on 16 September.

== International career ==
Bolkiah was eligible to represent the United States and Brunei. He was scouted for the youth teams of the United States but chose to represent Brunei, doing so at the U19 and U23 levels including at the 2015 Southeast Asian Games. In that tournament, he scored in a 1–2 defeat to Timor Leste. He was expected to make his senior international debut on 15 October 2016 in a 2016 AFF Championship qualification match against Timor-Leste. He debuted in the match, starting and playing the full 90 minutes of a 2–1 victory.

== Personal life ==
Faiq was born on 9 May 1998 in Los Angeles to Prince Jefri Bolkiah and a Malaysian mother. He has a twin sister named Qiana and at least 15 half siblings through his father. He holds both Bruneian and American citizenship and was educated in the United Kingdom at Bradfield College, Berkshire.

Faiq has been described as "the richest footballer in the world", with an estimated net worth of US$20 billion but this is actually the net worth of his uncle, Hassanal Bolkiah, the current Sultan of Brunei.

== Career statistics ==
=== International ===
Appearances and goals by national team and year
National team	Year	Apps	Goals
Brunei	2016	5	1
Brunei	2017	0	0
Brunei	2018	1	0
Total		6	1

As of 21 October 2016
Scores and results list Brunei's goal tally first, score column indicates score after each Bolkiah goal.

List of international goals scored by Faiq Bolkiah
No.	Date	Venue	Opponent	Score	Result	Competition
1	21 October 2016	RSN Stadium, Phnom Penh, Cambodia	Laos	2–3	3–4	2016 AFF Championship qualification

Faiq Bolkiah House of Bolkiah Born: 9 May 1998
Preceded by Hasan Kiko	Succession to the Bruneian throne 23rd position	Succeeded by Musa
