= Jardiel =

Brazilian footballer

Personal information
- Full name: Jardiel Maciel Libertino da Silva
- Date of birth: 21 March 2005 (age 21)
- Place of birth: Santo Amaro das Brotas, Brazil
- Height: 1.86 m (6 ft 1 in)
- Position: Striker

Team information
- Current team: Novorizontino (on loan from Grêmio)
- Number: 40

Youth career
- 2018–2022: Maruinense
- 2022–: Grêmio

Senior career*
| Years | Team | Apps | (Gls) |
| 2024– | Grêmio | 5 | (0) |
| 2026– | → Novorizontino (loan) | 1 | (0) |
- * Club domestic league appearances and goals as of 16 April 2026

Jardiel Maciel Libertino da Silva (born 21 March 2005), simply known as Jardiel, is a Brazilian professional footballer who plays as a striker for Novorizontino, on loan from Grêmio.

== Career ==
Revealed by CS Maruinense from Sergipe, Jardiel reached Grêmio youth categories in 2022. In 2024 he was the team's highlight and top scorer in the Copa São Paulo de Futebol Jr. Transitioning to the professional ranks, he was part of the champion squad of the 2024 Campeonato Gaúcho.

== Honours ==
Grêmio

- Campeonato Gaúcho: 2024

Individual

- 2024 Copa São Paulo de Futebol Júnior top scorer: 9 goals
