= 2024 Copa São Paulo de Futebol Júnior =

54th edition of the Copa São Paulo de Futebol Júnior

Copinha Sicredi 2024
- Official logo of the 2024 Copa São Paulo de Futebol Júnior

Tournament details
- Country: Brazil
- Dates: 2 January – 25 January
- Teams: 128

Final positions
- Champions: (São Paulo (state)) Corinthians (11th title)
- Runners-up: (Minas Gerais) Cruzeiro

Tournament statistics
- Matches played: 250
- Goals scored: 775 (3.1 per match)
- Top goal scorer(s): Jardiel (Grêmio) (9 goals)
- All statistics correct as of January 25, 2024.

The 2024 Copa São Paulo de Futebol Júnior (also known as Copinha Sicredi 2024 for sponsorship reasons), was the 54th edition of the Copa São Paulo de Futebol Júnior, a youth football competition, organized by the São Paulo Federation of Football (FPF). Corinthians won the competition after defeating Cruzeiro in the final on a score of 1–0, giving the Paulista team their 11th trophy of the Copa São Paulo de Futebol Júnior.

Considered one of the most traditional in Brazil, the 2024 edition took place between January 2 and 25 and was contested by 128 teams divided into 32 groups. The top two teams in each group advanced to the next stage, which were played in knockout matches. Therefore, the teams reduced by half at each stage until the final.

The two-time champions in a row, Palmeiras were the defending champions of the competition having won in 2022 and the year before, 2023, but were eliminated in the Round of 16 after an upsetting 1–0 defeat to Aster Brasil.

== Format and participants ==
On November 22, 2023, the FPF announced the groups and venues for the 2024 edition that will end on the anniversary of the city of São Paulo, January 25.

The venues are: Alumínio, Araraquara, Assis, Bálsamo, Barueri, Bebedouro, Catanduva, Cravinhos, Diadema, Franca, Guaratinguetá, Guarulhos, Itapira, Itaquaquecetuba, Jaú, Leme, Marília, Mogi das Cruzes, Osasco, Porto Feliz, Salto Grande, Santana de Parnaíba, São Bernardo do Campo, São Carlos, São Paulo, Suzano, Taubaté, Tietê, Tupã.

The 128 participants by state are:

- Acre: Rio Branco Futebol Clube
- Alagoas: Clube de Regatas Brasil (CRB), Centro Sportivo Alagoano and Cruzeiro de Arapiraca
- Amapá: Esporte Clube Macapá
- Amazonas: Nacional Fast Clube (Fast Clube)
- Bahia: Esporte Clube Bahia, Conquista Futebol Clube, Esporte Clube Jacuipense and Esporte Clube Vitória
- Ceará: Ceará Sporting Club, Atlético Cearense, Floresta Esporte Clube and Fortaleza Esporte Clube
- Distrito Federal: Capital Clube de Futebol, Canaã Esporte Clube and Sociedade Esportiva do Gama
- Espírito Santo: Porto Vitória Futebol Clube and Nova Venécia Futebol Clube
- Goiás: Atlético Clube Goianiense, Goiás Esporte Clube, Trindade Atlético Clube and Vila Nova Futebol Clube
- Maranhão: Sampaio Corrêa Futebol Clube and Timon Esporte Clube
- Mato Grosso: Cuiabá Esporte Clube and Nova Mutum Esporte Clube
- Mato Grosso do Sul: Ivinhema Futebol Clube and Clube de Esportes União ABC
- Minas Gerais: Clube Atlético Mineiro, América Futebol Clube (MG), Cruzeiro Esporte Clube and Coimbra Sports
- Pará: Carajás Esporte Clube, Castanhal Esporte Clube and Clube do Remo
- Paraíba: Sociedade Esportiva Queimadense and Serra Branca Esporte Clube
- Parana: Club Athletico Paranaense, Coritiba Foot Ball Club, Patriotas Futebol Clube and Operário Ferroviário Esporte Clube
- Pernambuco: Clube Náutico Capibaribe, Retrô Futebol Clube Brasil, Santa Cruz Futebol Clube and Sport Club do Recife
- Piauí: Sociedade Esportiva de Picos and Sociedade Esportiva Tiradentes
- Rio de Janeiro: Bangu Atlético Clube, Botafogo de Futebol e Regatas, Clube de Regatas Flamengo, Fluminense Futebol Clube, Madureira Esporte Clube, Associação Atlética Portuguesa do Rio de Janeiro and Clube de Regatas Vasco da Gama
- Rio Grande do Norte: ABC Futebol Clube, America de Natal and Associação Cultural e Desportiva Potiguar
- Rio Grande do Sul: Gremio Foot-Ball Porto Alegrense, SC Internacional, Esporte Clube Juventude and São José Esporte Clube
- Rondônia: Ji-Paraná Futebol Clube and Rondoniense Social Clube
- Roraima: São Raimundo Esporte Clube
- Santa Catarina: Associação Chapecoense de Futebol, Avaí Futebol Clube, Criciúma Esporte Clube, Figueirense Futebol Clube and Joinville Esporte Clube
- São Paulo: Esporte Clube Água Santa, Aster, Atlético Guaratinguetá, Botafogo Futebol Clube de São Paulo, Capivariano Futebol Clube, Catanduva Futebol Clube, Comercial Futebol Clube de Ribeirão Preto, Comercial Tietê, Sport Club Corinthians Paulista, Desportivo Brasil, Esporte Clube São Bernardo, Associação Ferroviária de Esportes, Associação Atlética Flamengo, Associação Atlética Francana, Guarani Futebol Clube, Ibrachina Futebol Clube, Inter de Bebedouro, Inter de Limeira, Sociedade Esportiva Itapirense, Ituano Futebol Clube, Clube Atlético Juventus, Lemense Futebol Clube, Marília Futebol Clube, Mirassol Futebol Clube, Atlético Monte Azul, Nacional Atlético Clube, Grêmio Novorizontino, Oeste Futebol Clube, Grêmio Osasco Audax Esporte Clube, Sociedade Esportiva Palmeiras, Associação Atlética Ponte Preta, Associação Portuguesa de Desportos, Portuguesa Santista, Red Bull Bragantino, Rio Claro Futebol Clube, Esporte Clube Santo André, Santos Futebol Clube, Esporte Clube São Bento, Associação Desportiva São Caetano, Grêmio Desportivo São-Carlense, São Paulo Futebol Clube, Sfera, Sharjah Brasil Futebol Clube, Futebol Clube SKA Brasil, União Suzano Atlético Clube, Tanabi Esporte Clube, Esporte Clube Taubaté, Tupã Futebol Clube, União Mogi, Associação Esportiva Velo Clube Rioclarense, Vila Operária Clube Esporte Mariano, Esporte Clube XV de Novembro (Jaú) and Esporte Clube XV de Piracicaba
- Sergipe: Atletico Gloriense, Lagarto Futebol Clube and Santa Cruz de Riachuelo
- Tocantins: Capital Futebol Clube and Sociedade Desportiva Sparta

== Final fases ==
=== Round of 64 ===
2024 Copa São Paulo de Futebol Júnior Round of 32
Date	Winner	Score	Eliminated	Venue/City
01/12/24	Athletico Paranaense	1 – 1 (4-1 p)	Tanabi	Tanabi
01/12/24	Ponte Preta	1–1 (5-4 p)	Catanduva	Catanduva
01/12/24	Coimbra	1–1 (3–2 p)	Figueirense	Balsamo
01/12/24	Gremio	4–1	Mirassol	Bebedouro
01/12/24	Novorizontino	2–0	Botafogo	Franca
01/12/24	Tiradentes	4–4 (5-4 p)	Chapecoense	Cravinhos
01/12/24	Ferroviaria	3–2	Gama	Araraquara
01/12/24	São Paulo	1–1 (4-2 p)	Ceará Sporting Club	Araraquara
01/12/24	Atletico Goianiense	5–1	Marilia	Marilia
01/12/24	Corinthians	2–2 (5–4 p)	Guarani	Marilia
01/12/24	Fortaleza	4–0	Internacional	Assis
01/12/24	CRB	0–0 (3-2 p)	XV de Jau	Jau
01/12/24	Ituano	3–2	Fluminense	Sao Carlos
01/12/24	Criciuma	2–1	Sao-Carlense	Sao Carlos
01/12/24	Capital	4–0	Capivariano	Tiete
01/12/24	America Mineiro	2–2 (5-3 p)	Desportivo Brasil	Porto Feliz
01/13/24	Botafogo (SP)	2–1	Floresta	Salto
01/13/24	Sfera	1–0	Atletico Mineiro	Santana de Parnaiba
01/13/24	Flamengo	1–0	Nautico	Osasco
01/13/24	Sao Jose	1–1 (6-5 p)	XV de Piracicaba	Aluminio
01/13/24	Taubate	0–0 (4-3 p)	Red Bull Bragantino	Taubate
01/13/24	Atletico Guaratingueta	1–0	Cuiaba	Guaratingueta
01/13/24	Aster Brasil	1–0	Oeste	Itaquaquecetuba
01/13/24	Palmeiras	3–1	Sport Recife	Barueri
01/13/24	Agua Santa	2–1	Juventude	Diadema
01/13/24	Santos	4–0	Sao Bernardo	Diadema
01/13/24	Portuguesa	2–0	Novo Mutum	Suzano
01/13/24	Cruzeiro	1–0	Madureira	Mogi das Cruzes
01/13/24	Vitoria	4–1	Vasco da Gama	Guarulhos
01/13/24	Ibrachina	4–0	Macapá	São Paulo
01/13/24	Coritiba	1–0	Retro	São Paulo
01/13/24	Juventus	1–0	Avai	São Paulo

=== Round of 32 ===
Date	Winner	Score	Eliminated	Venue/City
01/14/24	Athletico Paranaense	2-1	Ponte Preta	Catanduva
01/14/24	Gremio	4-2	Coimbra	Franca
01/14/24	Novorizontino	3–0	Tiradentes	Cravinhos
01/14/24	São Paulo	2-1	Ferroviaria	Araraquara
01/14/24	Corinthians	4-1	Atletico Goianiense	Marilia
01/14/24	CRB	1-0	Fortaleza	Jau
01/14/24	Ituano	3–0	Criciuma	Sao Carlos
01/14/24	America Mineiro	2–0	Capital	Porto Feliz
01/15/24	Botafogo (SP)	0-0 (4-3 p)	Sfera	Salto
01/15/24	Flamengo	3-1	Sao Jose	Osasco
01/15/24	Atletico Guaratingueta	2-0	Taubate	Guarantingueta
01/15/24	Aster Brasil	1-0	Palmeiras	Barueri
01/15/24	Santos	4-2	Agua Santa	Diadema
01/15/24	Cruzeiro	1-0	Portuguesa	Mogi das Cruzes
01/15/24	Ibrachina	1-1 (6-5 p)	Vitoria	São Paulo
01/15/24	Coritiba	0-0 (5-4 p)	Juventus	São Paulo

=== Round of 16 ===
Date	Winner	Score	Eliminated	Venue/City
01/16/24	Athletico Paranaense	5-3	Gremio	Franca
01/16/24	Novorizontino	3-2	São Paulo	Araraquara
01/16/24	Corinthians	6-0	CRB	Marília
01/16/24	America Mineiro	2-1	Ituano	São Carlos
01/17/24	Flamengo	2-1	Botafogo (SP)	Osasco
01/17/24	Aster Brasil	2-1	Atletico Guaratingueta	Itaquaquecetuba
01/17/24	Cruzeiro	3-0	Santos	Barueri
01/17/24	Coritiba	1-1 (4-2 p)	Ibrachina	Sao Paulo

=== Quarter-finals ===
Date	Winner	Score	Eliminated	Venue/City
01/18/24	Novorizontino	3-1	Athletico Paranaense	Franca
01/18/24	Corinthians	2-0	America Mineiro	Marilia
01/19/24	Flamengo	1-1 (4-3 p)	Aster Brasil	Osasco
01/19/24	Cruzeiro	1-0	Coritiba	Barueri

=== Semi-finals ===
Date	Winner	Score	Eliminated	Venue/City
01/22/24	Corinthians	3-0	Novorizontino	São Paulo
01/22/24	Cruzeiro	2-1	Flamengo	Barueri

=== Final ===
Date	Champion	Score	Runner-up	Venue/City
01/25/24	Corinthians	1-0	Cruzeiro	São Paulo

The 2024 Copa São Paulo de Futebol Júnior final was the final match which decided the winner of the 2024 Copa São Paulo de Futebol Júnior. This was the 54th edition of the "Copinha", the top-tier Brazilian U-20 club football tournament organized by the Sao Paulo Football Federation as a nationwide competition.

2024 Copa São Paulo de Futebol Júnior final
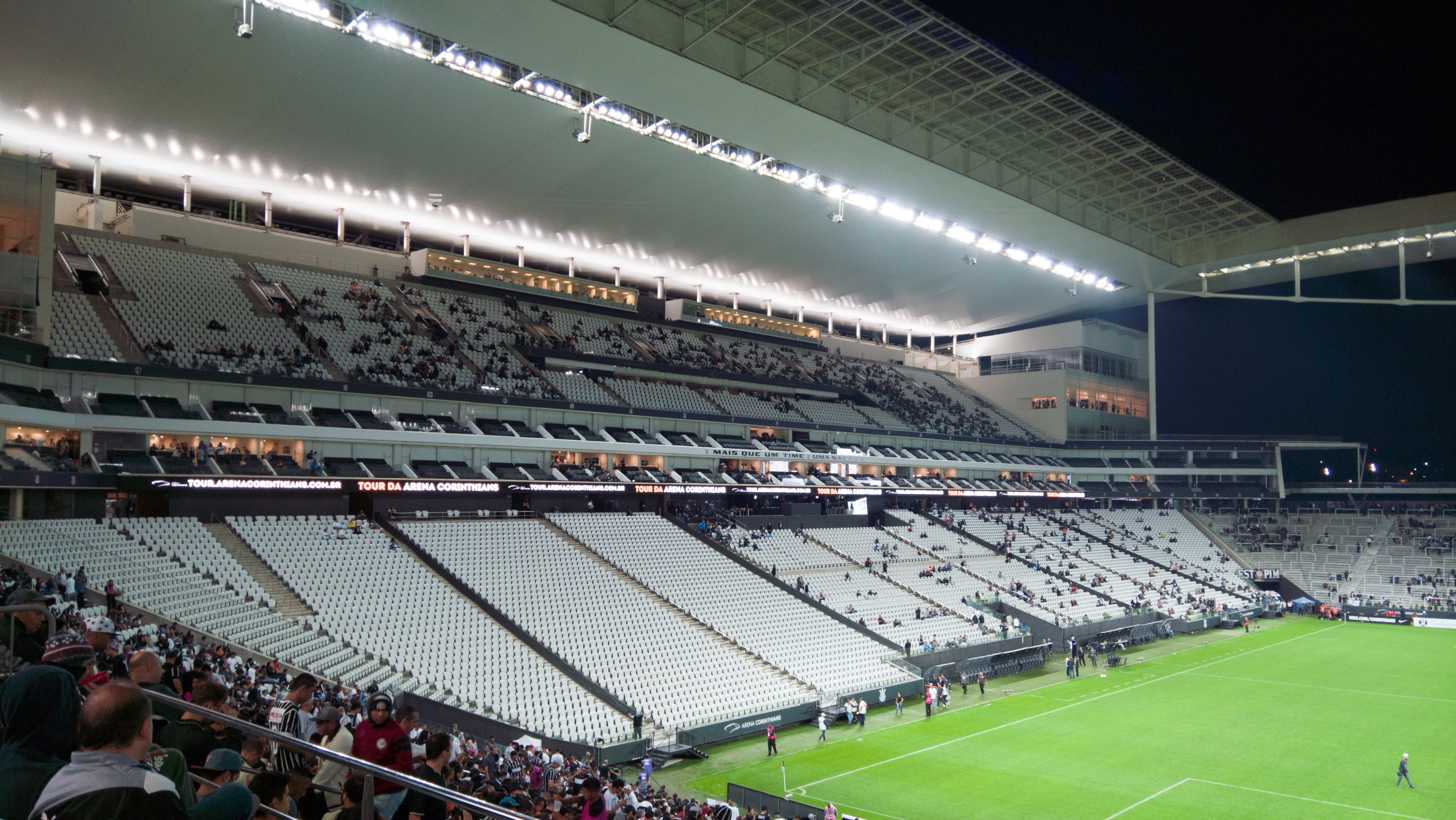
- The Neo Quimica Arena stadium where the final was played
Corinthians	Cruzeiro
(São Paulo (state))	(Minas Gerais)
1	0
- Date: 25 January 2024
- Venue: Neo Quimica Arena, São Paulo
- Man of the Match: Kayke (Corinthians)
- Referee: Gabriel Henrique Meira Bispo

The match was played between "Paulista" team Corinthians and "Mineiro" side Cruzeiro on 25 January 2024 at the Neo Quimica Arena in Sao Paulo, Brazil.

Corinthians won their eleventh Copinha by defeating Cruzeiro 1–0 after a hard fought 1st and 2nd half

=== Background and paths to the final ===
Corinthians looked for its 11th title, while Cruzeiro is looked for its 2nd title. Corinthians had reached their 19th final, the last being in the 2017 edition where they became champions by beating Batatais. Cruzeiro had already reached his third Copinha decision and, after being runner-up in 1996 and 2002, he won the 2007 edition against São Paulo. Facing each other in an unprecedented final, the last time the Alvinegros and Cruzeirenses faced each other in the Copinha was in the semifinals of the 2016 edition, where the São Paulo team advanced to the final after winning 2–1.

Both teams arrived for the clash undefeated in the competition. Drawn in Group 10, and based in Marília, Corinthians debuted on January 3 against Ji-Paraná, beating them 6–0. This was followed by a victory against Bangu by 1–0, and a draw with Marília by 0–0. In the second phase, they beat Guarani on penalties 5–4, after drawing 2–2 in normal time. In the third phase, they beat Atlético Goianiense 4–1. In the round of 16, they beat CRB 6–0. In the quarterfinals, they beat América Mineiro 2–0. In the semifinals, they beat Novorizontino 3–0, in a match held at Neo Química Arena, the Alvinegro stadium, in São Paulo, guaranteeing a place in the final after 7 years of absence.

Cruzeiro, in turn, was drawn in Group 28 and had its headquarters in Mogi das Cruzes. Their tournament debut was on January 4 against Capital-TO, where they won 1–0. This was followed by a draw with Novo Mutum by 1–1, and a rout against União Mogi by 9–0, one of the two biggest of the edition. Still in Mogi, they beat Madureira 1–0 in the second phase. In the third phase, they beat Portuguesa again by 1–0. He moved to Barueri, where he beat Santos 3–0 in the round of 16. In the quarterfinals, they beat Coritiba 1–0. In the semifinals, they beat Flamengo 2–1, guaranteeing a place in the final after 17 years of absence. This was the second edition in a row where São Paulo and Minas Gerais faced each other in the final.
