= Crystian =

Brazilian footballer (born 1992)

Personal information
- Full name: Crystian Souza Carvalho
- Date of birth: 10 June 1992 (age 34)
- Place of birth: Goiânia, Brazil
- Height: 1.71 m (5 ft 7 1/2 in)
- Position: Right back

Team information
- Current team: Guanabara City

Youth career
- Vila Nova
- 2009–2011: Santos

Senior career*
Years	Team	Apps	(Gls)
2011–2015	Santos	15	(0)
2013	→ Botafogo-SP (loan)	1	(0)
2013	→ Boa Esporte (loan)	11	(0)
2014	→ Paulista (loan)	3	(0)
2015	→ Paraná (loan)	2	(0)
2016	Paysandu	8	(1)
2016–2017	Penapolense	12	(0)
2017	XV de Piracicaba	0	(0)
2018	Barretos	16	(0)
2019	Novo Horizonte	10	(2)
2019	Aparecida	6	(0)
2020	Vila Nova	7	(0)
2021	Figueirense	5	(0)
2021	Altos	2	(0)
2021	Guanabara City		
2022	Ceilândia		
2022	Guanabara City		
2023	Brasília		
2023–	Guanabara City		

International career
2009	Brazil U17	2	(0)
- * Club domestic league appearances and goals as of 25 September 2021

Crystian Souza Carvalho (born 10 June 1992), simply known as Crystian, is a Brazilian footballer who plays for Guanabara City as a right back.

== Career ==
Born in Goiânia, Goiás, Crystian joined Santos' youth setup in 2009, aged 17, after starting it out at Vila Nova. On 21 January 2011 he was promoted to the former's main squad by manager Adílson Batista.

On 5 February Crystian made his professional debut, playing the last 24 minutes of a 1–1 away draw against Santo André for the Campeonato Paulista championship. He made his Série A debut on 31 August, coming on as a late substitute in a 3–3 away draw against Internacional.

On 8 December 2012, Crystian was loaned to Botafogo-SP, along with two teammates. He subsequently served another temporary deals at Boa Esporte and Paulista, never as a regular starter.

Ahead of the 2020 season, Crystian returned to his first club Vila Nova.

== Career statistics ==
As of 4 March 2021

Club	Season	League			State League		National Cup		Continental		Other		Total	
Club	Season	Division	Apps	Goals	Apps	Goals	Apps	Goals	Apps	Goals	Apps	Goals	Apps	Goals
Santos	2011	Série A	6	0	2	0	0	0	—		—		8	0
Santos	2012	Série A	1	0	6	0	0	0	—		—		7	0
Santos	Subtotal		7	0	8	0	0	0	—		—		15	0
Botafogo-SP	2013	Paulista	—		1	0	—		—		—		1	0
Boa Esporte	2013	Série B	11	0	—		—		—		—		11	0
Paulista	2014	Paulista	—		3	0	—		—		—		3	0
Paraná	2015	Série B	2	0	—		—		—		—		2	0
Paysandu	2016	Série B	0	0	8	1	2	0	—		2 (Note: Appearance(s) in Copa Verde)	0	12	1
Penapolense	2016	Paulista A2	—		0	0	—		—		3 (Note: Appearance(s) in Copa Paulista)	0	3	0
Penapolense	2017	Paulista A2	—		12	0	—		—		—		12	0
Penapolense	Subtotal		—		12	0	—		—		3	0	15	0
XV de Piracicaba	2017	Paulista A2	—		0	0	—		—		7	0	7	0
Barretos	2018	Paulista A3	—		16	0	—		—		—		16	0
Novo Horizonte	2019	Goiano	—		10	2	—		—		—		10	2
Aparecida	2019	Goiano 2ª Divisão	—		6	0	—		—		—		6	0
Vila Nova	2020	Série C	0	0	7	0	2	0	—		0	0	9	0
Figueirense	2021	Série C	0	0	3	0	0	0	—		—		3	0
Career total			20	0	74	3	4	0	0	0	12	0	110	3

== International career ==
Crystian appeared in two matches with Brazil under-17's in 2009 FIFA U-17 World Cup, against Japan and Mexico.

== Honours ==
Santos

- Campeonato Paulista: 2011, 2012

Paysandu

- Campeonato Paraense: 2016
- Copa Verde: 2016
