= Pupo Gimenez =

Brazilian football manager (1931–2016)

Personal information
- Full name: Antônio Maria Pupo Gimenez
- Date of birth: 31 August 1931
- Place of birth: Presidente Alves, Brazil
- Date of death: 2 April 2016 (aged 84)
- Place of death: Marília, Brazil

Managerial career
- Years: Team
- 1972: União Bandeirante
- 1973: Marília
- 1977: Linense
- 1983: Guarani
- 1988–1990: São Paulo (youth)
- 1989: São Paulo (caretaker)
- 1990: São Paulo (caretaker)
- 1993: Marília
- 1994: Guarani (U20)
- 1995: Corinthians (U20)
- 1995: Brazil U23
- 1999: Independente de Limeira

Pupo Gimenez (31 August 1931 – 2 April 2016) was a Brazilian football manager.

== Career ==
Amateur football coach, Pupo Gimenez gained notoriety when he became coordinator of Marília youth categories. As a talent scout, he put together the team that won the 1979 Copa São Paulo de Futebol Jr. He later worked at Guarani, and became an assistant to the main team. In 1988 he was taken to São Paulo where he was the club's caretaker coach in 1989 and 1990. He returned to Guarani and won the Copa SP, this time as manager, in 1994. In 1995, he repeated the feat for Corinthians, which guaranteed him the position of coach of the Brazil U23 national teamat the 1995 Pan American Games. He is also known for scouting and developing important players in Brazilian football, such as Paulo César Borges, Jorginho, Márcio Rossini, Luizão, Neto and Casemiro.

== Death ==
Suffering from depression, Pupo Gimenez committed suicide at the age of 84 in Marília, where he lived with his family.

== Honours ==
São Paulo

- Torneio Eduardo José Farah: 1988

Guarani U20

- Copa São Paulo de Futebol Jr.: 1994

Corinthians U20

- Copa São Paulo de Futebol Jr.: 1995

Brazil U23

- Copa Mercosur: 1995
