= Guanabara City Futebol Clube =

Football club in the city Goiânia, in Brazil

Guanabara City
- Full name: Guanabara City Futebol Clube
- Founded: 15 November 1999; 26 years ago
- Ground: Estádio Serra Grande, Goiânia, Goiás state, Brazil
- President: Cid Sá de Sousa
- Head Coach: Heli Carlos
- League: Campeonato Goiano Terceira Divisão
- 2025: Goiano Terceira Divisão, 6th of 12
Home colours	Away colours

Guanabara City Futebol Clube, better known as Guanabara City, is a football club in the city of Goiânia, in the Brazilian state of Goiás.

== History ==
Founded on 15 November 1999, and legally registered as a private sports association on 14 December of the same year, Guanabara City made its professional football debut in the 2021 Campeonato Goiano Third Division.

In the 2024, Guanabara City lost both semi final matches to Rio Verde.

The team made its debut in Copinha Sicredi 2026 where it made it to the playoffs, but was eliminated in the quarterfinals to Cruizero EC.

== Players ==
=== Squad 2021 ===
As of 24 October 2021. Source: FGF

Note: Flags indicate national team as defined under FIFA eligibility rules; some limited exceptions apply. Players may hold more than one non-FIFA nationality.

No.	Pos.	Nation	Player
1	GK	BRA	Marcos Antônio
2	RB	BRA	Crystian Souza Carvalho
3	DF	BRA	Rodrigo Rodrigues
4	DF	BRA	Lucas Frank Pereira
5	DF	BRA	Giovani Junio Sousa
6	LB	BRA	Wester Manoel Geraldo
7	FW	BRA	Jose Gabriel Tavares
8	MF	BRA	Maycon Valeriano
9	FW	BRA	Joao Victor Santana
10	FW	BRA	Vinicios Vieira da Silva
11	FW	BRA	Marcelo Henrique

No.	Pos.	Nation	Player
12	GK	BRA	Wallace Sousa Santos
13	RB	BRA	Vitor da Silva Costa
14	FW	BRA	Pedro Henrique Silva
15	DF	BRA	Guilherme Campos Rosa
16	MF	BRA	Danilo Magalhães
17	LB	BRA	Fabricio Batista
18	FW	BRA	Dauri Barbosa
