= Renan Areias =

Brazilian footballer (born 1998)

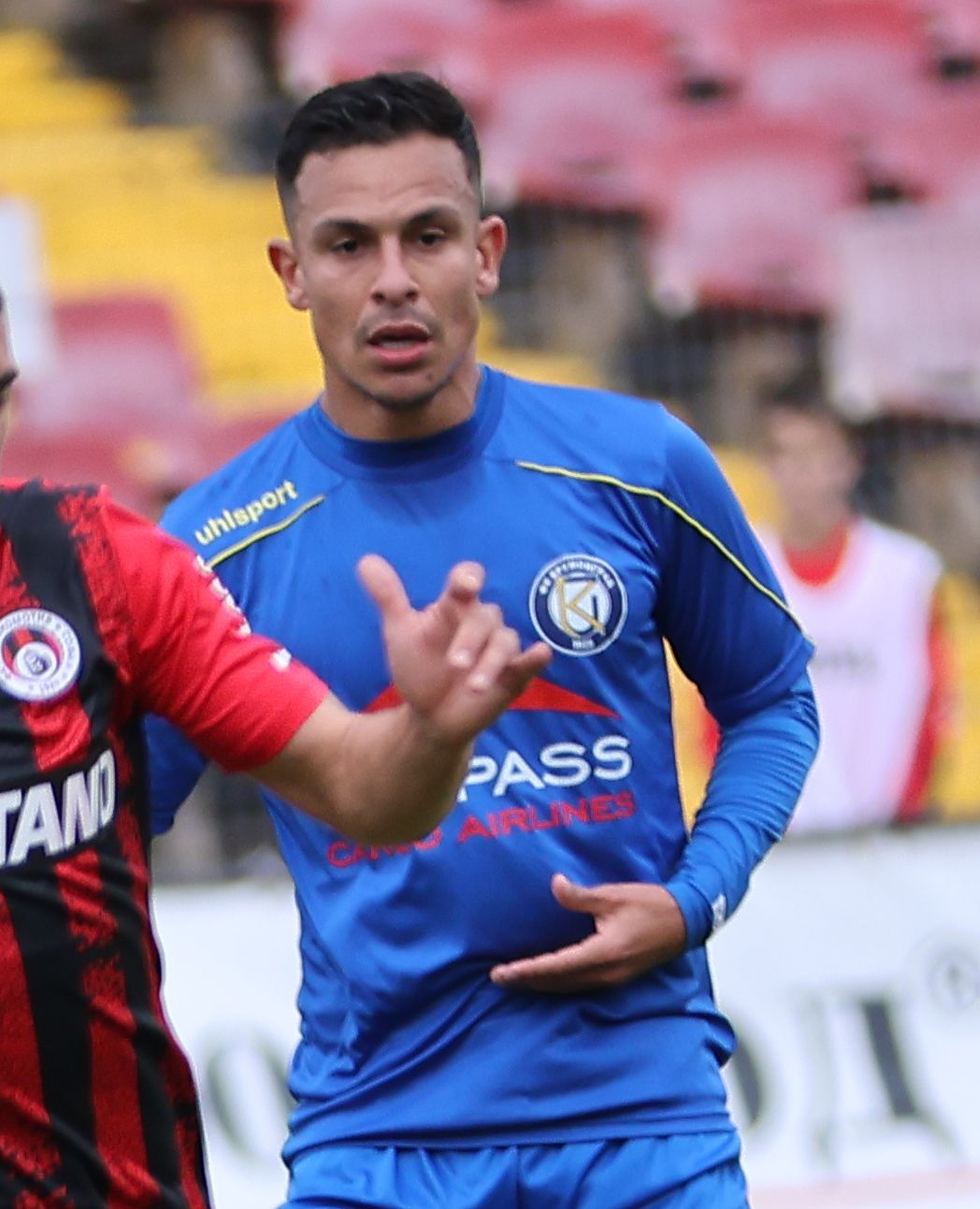

Personal information
- Full name: Renan Carvalho Areias
- Date of birth: 18 January 1998 (age 28)
- Place of birth: São Paulo, Brazil
- Height: 1.74 m (5 ft 8 1/2 in)
- Position: Midfielder

Team information
- Current team: Gyeongnam
- Number: 88

Youth career
- –2018: Corinthians

Senior career*
Years	Team	Apps	(Gls)
2018–2019	Corinthians	0	(0)
2018	→ Red Bull Brasil	0	(0)
2019–2021	Roeselare	17	(1)
2020	→ Ashdod (loan)	10	(0)
2020	→ Hapoel Iksal (loan)	17	(2)
2021	Confiança	14	(0)
2021–2022	Criciúma	17	(0)
2023	Cianorte	11	(0)
2023	→ Camboriú (loan)	5	(0)
2023–2024	Krumovgrad	26	(1)
2024	→ Cherno More (loan)	10	(0)
2025–	Gyeongnam	31	(2)

International career
2014–2015	Brazil U17	10	(0)
- * Club domestic league appearances and goals as of 7 January 2026

Renan Carvalho Areias (born 18 January 1998), commonly known as Renan Areias, is a Brazilian professional footballer who currently plays as a midfielder for K League 2 club Gyeongnam.

== Career ==
Areias has represented teams in his home country, Belgium and Israel. In July 2023, he joined newly promoted Bulgarian club Krumovgrad.

== Career statistics ==
=== Club ===
As of 13 October 2019.

Club	Season	League			State League		Cup		Continental		Other		Total	
Club	Season	Division	Apps	Goals	Apps	Goals	Apps	Goals	Apps	Goals	Apps	Goals	Apps	Goals
Corinthians	2018	Série A	0	0	0	0	0	0	0	0	0	0	0	0
Corinthians	2019	Série A	0	0	0	0	0	0	0	0	0	0	0	0
Corinthians	Total		0	0	0	0	0	0	0	0	0	0	0	0
Red Bull Brasil (loan)	2018	–			0	0	0	0	–		6 (Note: Appearances in the Copa Paulista)	0	6	0
Roeselare	2019–20	Proximus League	6	0	–		1 (Note: Appearances in the Belgian Cup)	0	–		0	0	7	0
F.C. Ashdod	2019–20	Israeli Premier League	11	0	–		1 (Note: Appearances in the Israeli State Cup)	0	–		0	0	11	0
Hapoel Iksal	2020–21	Liga Leumit	17	2	–		1	0	–		3	1	21	3
Confiança	2021	Série B	0	0	0	0	0	0	0	0	0	0	0	0
Career total			34	2	0	0	3	0	0	0	9	0	45	3
