= Volkan Eğri =

Turkish footballer (born 1998)

Personal information
- Date of birth: 2 April 1998 (age 28)
- Place of birth: Darmstadt, Germany
- Height: 1.73 m (5 ft 8 in)
- Position: Left winger

Youth career
- –2011: Darmstadt 98
- 2011–2019: Eintracht Frankfurt

Senior career*
Years	Team	Apps	(Gls)
2019–2022	Sivasspor	1	(0)
2020	→ Čelik Zenica (loan)	1	(0)
2020–2021	→ Sivas Belediyespor (loan)	23	(2)
2022	Tuzlaspor	0	(0)
2023	SC Viktoria Griesheim	9	(0)
2023–2024	Bayern Alzenau	16	(0)
2024–2025	Sakaryaspor	14	(0)

International career^{‡}
2015	Turkey U18	3	(0)
- * Club domestic league appearances and goals as of 10 May 2025 ‡ National team caps and goals as of 21:27, 26 May 2022 (UTC)

Volkan Eğri (born 2 April 1998) is a professional footballer who plays as a left winger. Born in Germany, he is a former youth international for Turkey.

== Club career ==
A youth product of the German clubs Darmstadt 98 and Eintracht Frankfurt, Eğri signed his first professional contract with Sivasspor on 16 August 2019. He made his professional debut with Sivasspor in a 2–2 Süper Lig tie with Gençlerbirliği on 22 December 2019. He went on loan to the Bosnian club Čelik Zenica in January 2020, and followed that with a loan to Sivas Belediyespor on 6 October 2020.

== International career ==
Born in Germany, Eğri is of Turkish descent. He represented the Turkey U18s in 2015.

== Honours ==
Sivasspor

- Turkish Cup: 2021–22
