= National Football Academy (Singapore) =

Former football academy in Singapore

Coordinates: 1°18′36″N 103°51′37″E

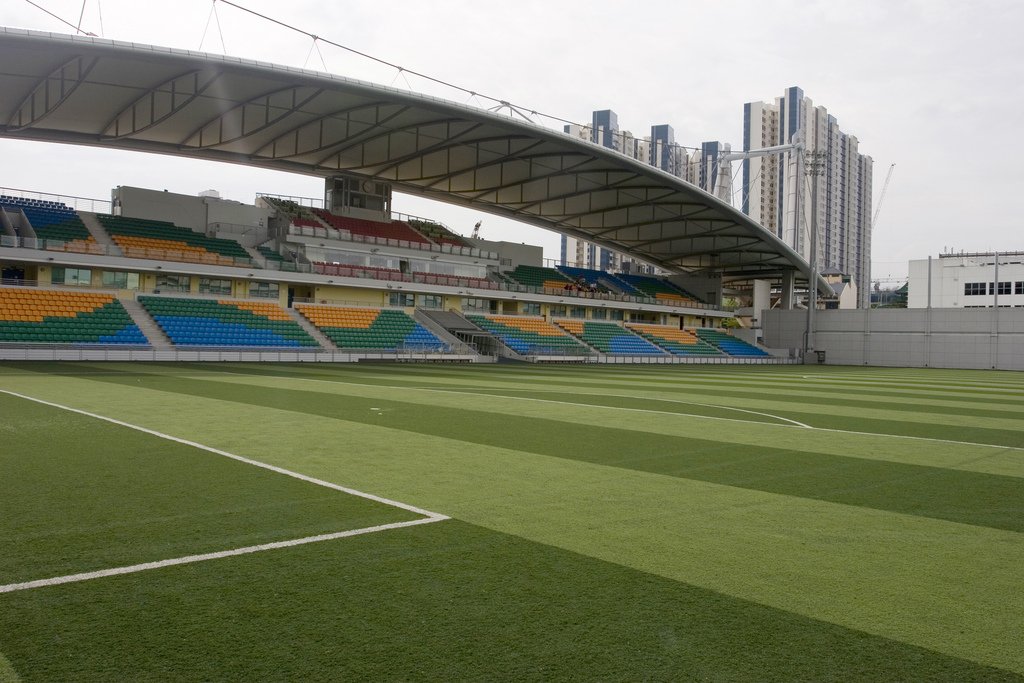
- Short name: NFA
- Founded: 13 August 2000; 26 years ago
- Association: Football Association of Singapore
- League: Prime League
- Stadium: Jalan Besar Sports and Recreation Centre; Jalan Besar, Singapore
- Branches: NFA Blues U-17; NFA Reds U-18

The National Football Academy, commonly referred to as NFA, was a football academy in Singapore. It was established by the Football Association of Singapore (FAS) on 13 August 2000 with the aim of developing Singapore's most promising young footballers. Trainees were scouted through a systematic talent identification process before being given the chance to develop their skills under some of the best youth coaches in the country. With teams at every age level from Under-14 to Under-18, the NFA coordinates the development of young Singaporean footballers at a national level through the domestic league system, international youth tournaments as well as overseas training attachments.

The NFA Under-18 team was made up of promising Singaporean players under the age of 18 and served as a feeder team mainly to the Young Lions as well as other clubs in the S. League. The FAS entered both the NFA Blues Under-17 and NFA Reds Under-18 teams in the Prime League, the reserve league for S. League clubs, which ran from 1997 to 2017, to allow their players to gain more exposure and match experience by playing against older and more experienced players.

When Prime League teams were allowed to participate in the Singapore FA Cup from 2006 to 2017, the NFA teams participating in the Prime League also participated in the Singapore FA Cup. The Under-18 team reached the final in 2007, where they lost to Geylang International's Prime League team.

The NFA Under-15 and Under-16 teams also participated in the annual Lion City Cup organised by the FAS from 2011 onwards. The Under-16 teams finished runners up in 2011 and 2012, while the Under-16 team finished third in 2011.

The NFA was later renamed the FAS Football Academy (FFA). In a response to media queries in October 2019, the FAS stated as follows.

“Moving forward, we will be working closely with the Singapore Premier League clubs, schools and academies to widen the base of elite players for selection towards the age-group national teams. We will also develop and administer standards for youth development, and most importantly, intensify our efforts to scout talented players for the national teams.”

The NFA / FFA effectively ceased to exist in 2019.

The NFA produced many graduates who went on to represent the Singapore national team.

The Under-15 and Under-17 leagues are now part of a broader range of age-group leagues under the Singapore Youth League, covering several age groups.

== NFA Under-15 ==
NFA U-15 performance record at the Lion City Cup

Edition	Year	Placing
23rd	2011	3rd
24th	2012	6th
25th	2013	6th
26th	2015	4th

== NFA Under-16 ==
NFA U-16 performance record at the Lion City Cup

Edition	Year	Placing
23rd	2011	Runners-up
24th	2012	Runners-up
25th	2013	5th
26th	2015	3rd

== Central of Excellence Developmental Football League ==
More commonly known as the COE League, it was a youth developmental league for the youth players of S. League clubs. There were four categories of the league: U13, U14, U15, U16, U17 and U18.

In 2013, the FAS revamped its youth development programme to develop talent through the Centre of Excellence (COE) system. NFA ceased to operate soon after.

From 2014 onwards, the FAS continued to organise both an Under-15 League and an Under-17 League through the COE, until 2023.

The Under-15 and Under-17 leagues are now part of a broader range of age-group leagues under the Singapore Youth League, which covers several age groups.

The main leagues were as follows:

Tier	Youth football leagues
1	Centre of Excellence U19 Developmental League
2	Centre of Excellence U16 Developmental League Tier 1
3	Centre of Excellence U16 Developmental League Tier 2

=== League Winners and Runners-up (Until 2017) ===
Season	Winners	Runners-up
2005	NFA U17(U18 COE League)	SAFFC(U18 COE League)
2006	NFA U16(U18 COE League); Home United FC (U16 COE League)	NFA U17(U18 COE League); Balestier Khalsa FC (U16 COE League)
2012	NFA U16(U18 COE League)	
2014	Warriors FC U18 (U18 COE League)	Home United U18 (U18 COE League)
2017	Home United FC U17 (U17 COE League)	NFA U15 (U17 COE League)

=== Cup Winners ===
Season	Winners	Runners-up
2017	Home United FC U17	Warriors FC U17

== Merlion Youth League ==
The Merlion Youth League, MYL was a youth football tournament founded in 2014. It was a tournament for youth who do not compete or who formerly competed in the FAS COE Developmental Football League. The clubs which took part in the league are amateur clubs or clubs which are associated with the NFL clubs.

=== League Winners and Runners-up (until 2017) ===
Season	Winners	Runners-up
2014/15 Merlion Series	Amateur Staggers FC	Boon Keng SRC
2015	TJ Wanderers	Amateur Staggers FC
2016	Bedok Youth Soccerites (U21); Flybois FC (U17); Bedok Youth Soccerites (U15)	Boon Keng SRC (U21, U17 and U15)
2017	Sinda Lions FC (U21); Woodgrove YEC (U18); Fajar Selatan FC (U16)	Woodgrove YEC (U21); Boon Keng SRC (U18, U16)

=== Cup Winners ===
Season	Winners	Runners-up
2015 PlayPal Cup	Amateur Staggers FC	West J. United
2016 MYL Cup	Bedok Youth Soccerites (U21 Winners); Boon Keng SRC (U17 and U15 Winners)	Boon Keng SRC (U21 Runners-up); Flybois FC (U17 Runners-up); Bedok Youth Soccerites (U15 Runners-up)

== NFA Under-17 ==
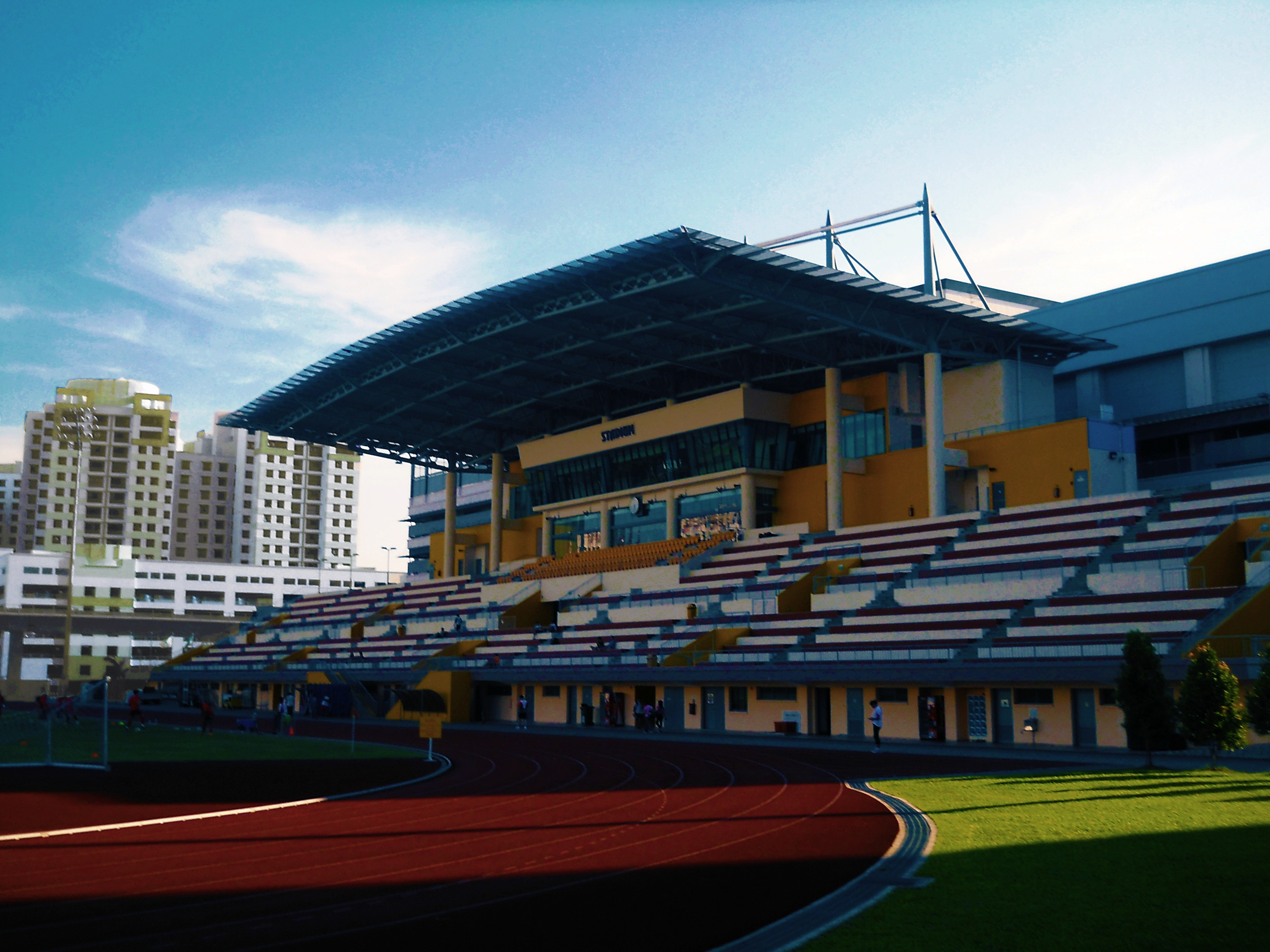
Jurong West Stadium

The NFA Blues is based at the 3,200-seater Jurong West Stadium for its Prime League matches.

=== 2014 Prime League squad ===
Note: Flags indicate national team as defined under FIFA eligibility rules; some limited exceptions apply. Players may hold more than one non-FIFA nationality.

No.	Pos.	Nation	Player
1		SGP	Muhammad Zharfan Bin Rohaizad
2	DF	SGP	Adam Hakeem
4		SGP	Royce Chua
5		SGP	Lionel Tan (c)
6		SGP	Ribiyanda Saswadimata
7		SGP	Mohamed Nasrul Bin Mohamed Taib
9		SGP	Andin Addie
10		SGP	Syafiq Irawan
11		SGP	Amiruldin Asraf
12		SGP	Hafiz Baharuddin

No.	Pos.	Nation	Player
13		SGP	Joshua Bernard Pereira
14		SGP	Rydha Syarriel
15		SGP	Leonard Chen
17	MF	SGP	Karthik Raj
18		SGP	Russell Joachim Lee
19		SGP	Zulkhair Mustaffa
20		SGP	Shah Zulkarnean
22		SGP	Ahmad Fadly Bin Mohamed Tamiri
24		SGP	Ariyan Shamsuddin
25		SGP	Brandon Marc Cher

== NFA Under-18 ==
The NFA Reds is based at the 3,000-seater Bukit Gombak Stadium for its Prime League matches.

=== 2014 Prime League squad ===
Note: Flags indicate national team as defined under FIFA eligibility rules; some limited exceptions apply. Players may hold more than one non-FIFA nationality.

No.	Pos.	Nation	Player
1	GK	SGP	Kenny Loh
2	DF	SGP	Ramle Umar Akhbar
3	DF	SGP	Darren Teh
4	DF	SGP	Taufiq Muqminin
5	DF	SGP	Sadik Said
6	DF	SGP	Kenneth Lee
7	MF	SGP	Zulfadhmi Suzliman
8	MF	SGP	Muhelmy Suhaimi (c)
9	FW	SGP	Iqram Rifqi
10	MF	SGP	Suhairi Sabri

No.	Pos.	Nation	Player
11	MF	SGP	Fahrish Khan
12	GK	SGP	Tham Yong Jun
13	MF	SGP	Haiqal Sulaiman
14	MF	SGP	Ashshiddiq Misban
15	MF	SGP	Khairuddin Omar
16	DF	SGP	Bryan Tan
17	DF	SGP	Daniel Shafiq
19	MF	SGP	Ashari Borhan
20	FW	SGP	A Pavithran
21	FW	SGP	Jeremy Lam

== See also ==
- Football in Singapore
- Football Association of Singapore
- Lion City Cup
- Young Lions
- Singapore national youth football team
- Singapore national football team
