= Mike van de Meulenhof =

Dutch footballer (born 1999)

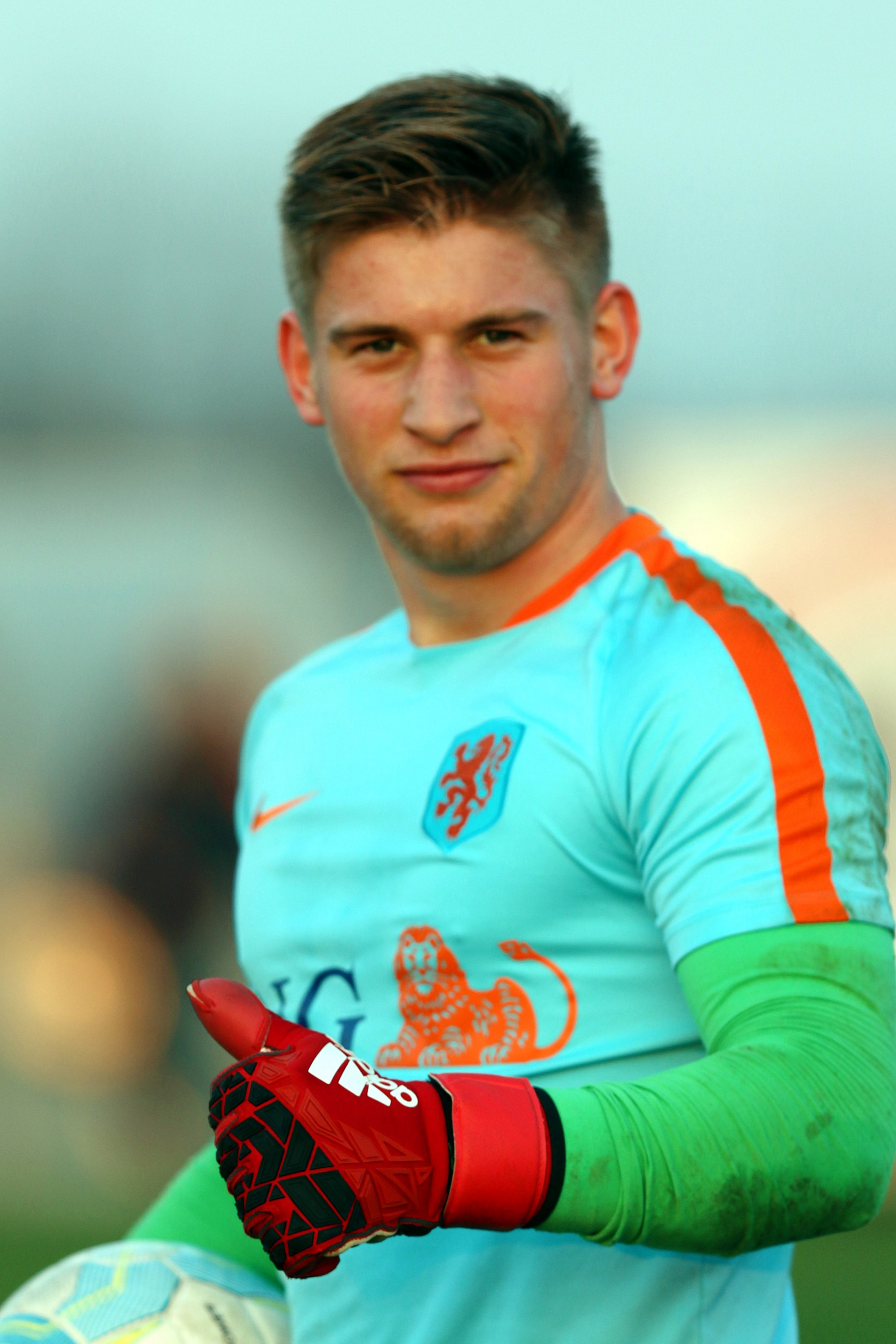

Personal information
- Date of birth: 11 May 1999 (age 27)
- Place of birth: Helmond, Netherlands
- Height: 1.79 m (5 ft 10 in)
- Position: Goalkeeper

Team information
- Current team: Kozakken Boys
- Number: 51

Youth career
- PSV

Senior career*
Years	Team	Apps	(Gls)
2018–2020	Jong PSV	27	(0)
2021–	Kozakken Boys	31	(0)

International career^{‡}
2014	Netherlands U15	3	(0)
2014–2015	Netherlands U16	8	(0)
2015–2016	Netherlands U17	13	(0)
2016–2017	Netherlands U18	4	(0)
2017–2018	Netherlands U19	7	(0)
2019	Netherlands U20	4	(0)
- * Club domestic league appearances and goals as of 09:52, 2 June 2024 (UTC) ‡ National team caps and goals as of 19 November 2019

Mike van de Meulenhof (born 11 May 1999) is a Dutch professional footballer who plays as goalkeeper for Tweede Divisie club Kozakken Boys.

== International career ==
He was the starting goalkeeper for Netherlands at the 2016 UEFA European Under-17 Championship, in which they reached the semi-final.
