= Associação Atlética Internacional =

Associação Atlética Internacional may refer to the following Brazilian football clubs:

- Associação Atlética Internacional (Bebedouro), a club from Bebedouro, São Paulo state
- Associação Atlética Internacional (Limeira), a club from Limeira, São Paulo state
