= Raça Sport Brazil =

Raça SB
- Full name: Raça Sport Brazil
- Founded: November 15, 1999
- Ground: Estádio Zico Brandão / Inhumas, Goiás state, Brazil
- Capacity: 4.380
- President: Nélio Costa Malheiro
- Head Coach: Marcelo Faria
- League: Campeonato Goiano (Third Division)
Home colours	Away colours

Raça Sport Brazil, also called Raça SB, is a Brazilian football club in the city of Goiânia, in the state of Goiás.

== History ==
Founded on November 15, 1999, the club competed only in the federation's amateur championships. And in 2014 the club's directors tried to enroll the team in third division Campeonato Goiano, but the application was not accepted by the federation.

The club played its first professional football championship in 2016 when it debuted in the third division of Campeonato Goiano.

== Achievements ==
- Campeonato Goiano (Third Division)
  - 4th place (1): 2016
  - 8th place (1): 2017
  - 7th place (1): 2018
  - 10th Place (1): 2019
