= Robin Schoonbrood =

Dutch footballer (born 1999)

Personal information
- Date of birth: 29 May 1999 (age 27)
- Place of birth: Tilburg, Netherlands
- Height: 1.79 m (5 ft 10 in)
- Position: Midfielder

Youth career
- –2007: SV Triborgh
- 2007–2018: PSV

Senior career*
Years	Team	Apps	(Gls)
2018–2021	Jong PSV	63	(2)
2021	Roda JC	2	(0)

International career^{‡}
2013–2014	Netherlands U15	4	(1)
2014–2015	Netherlands U16	7	(0)
- * Club domestic league appearances and goals as of 18 December 2021 ‡ National team caps and goals as of 16 April 2015

Robin Schoonbrood (born 29 May 1999) is a Dutch football player.

== Club career ==
He made his Eerste Divisie debut for Jong PSV on 7 September 2018 in a game against Jong FC Utrecht as a 61st-minute substitute for Marlon Frey.
