= Heleno (footballer, born 1955) =

Brazilian footballer

Personal information
- Full name: Heleno Abreu de Oliveira
- Date of birth: 30 September 1955 (age 71)
- Place of birth: Belo Horizonte, Brazil
- Position: Defensive midfielder

Youth career
- –1972: Atlético Mineiro

Senior career*
Years	Team	Apps	(Gls)
1972–1985	Atlético Mineiro	379	(25)
1978	→ América-SP (loan)		
1986	América-MG		
1989	Pouso Alegre		
1990	São José-SP		
- * Club domestic league appearances and goals as of 28 May 2024

Heleno Abreu de Oliveira (born 30 September 1955), simply known as Heleno, is a Brazilian former professional footballer who played as a defensive midfielder. He also acted as politician in Minas Gerais state.

== Career ==
A graduate of Atlético Mineiro's youth ranks, Heleno played for the club almost for his entire career. He made 389 appearances and won seven state titles. He had a brief spell at América-SP in 1978, and at América Mineiro in 1986. After a few years away from the field, he returned in 1989 at Pouso Alegre, and ended his career definitively in 1990.

== Personal life ==
Heleno has a postgraduate degree in public policy from the Federal University of Minas Gerais (UFMG). He was chief of staff to his former Atlético Mineiro teammate João Leite, sports secretary of Minas Gerais and councilman in Belo Horizonte for a brief period.

== Honours ==
Atlético Mineiro

- Campeonato Mineiro: 1976, 1978, 1979, 1980, 1981, 1982, 1983, 1985
- Trofeo Cidade de Vigo: 1977
- Tournoi de Paris: 1982
- Berna Philips Cup: 1983
