= Karim Bannani =

Dutch footballer (born 1998)

Personal information
- Date of birth: 26 July 1998 (age 28)
- Place of birth: Terneuzen, Netherlands
- Height: 1.82 m (6 ft 0 in)
- Position: Left back

Team information
- Current team: ACV
- Number: 28

Youth career
- Terneuzense Boys
- JVOZ
- 2012–2017: PSV

Senior career*
Years	Team	Apps	(Gls)
2017–2018	Jong PSV	5	(0)
2018	Dordrecht	4	(0)
2019–2022	Hoek	88	(5)
2023–	ACV	80	(3)
- * Club domestic league appearances and goals as of 21:29, 31 October 2025 (UTC)

Karim Bannani (born 26 July 1998) is a Dutch footballer who plays as a left back for ACV Assen in the Tweede Divisie.

== Career ==
Born in Terneuzen, Bannani played in the youth departments of Terneuzense Boys and JVOZ. He joined the PSV academy in 2012, and later became part of the second team, Jong PSV. In February 2018, he signed a two-and-a-half-year contract with FC Dordrecht.

On 7 January 2019, Bannani joined HSV Hoek after six months on free agent. He moved to ACV in summer 2023 since he moved to live in Groningen.
