= Cravinhos =

Municipality in the state of São Paulo in Brazil

- Municipality
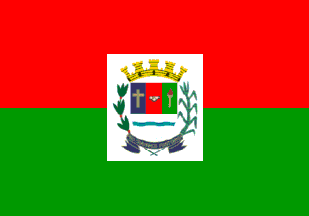
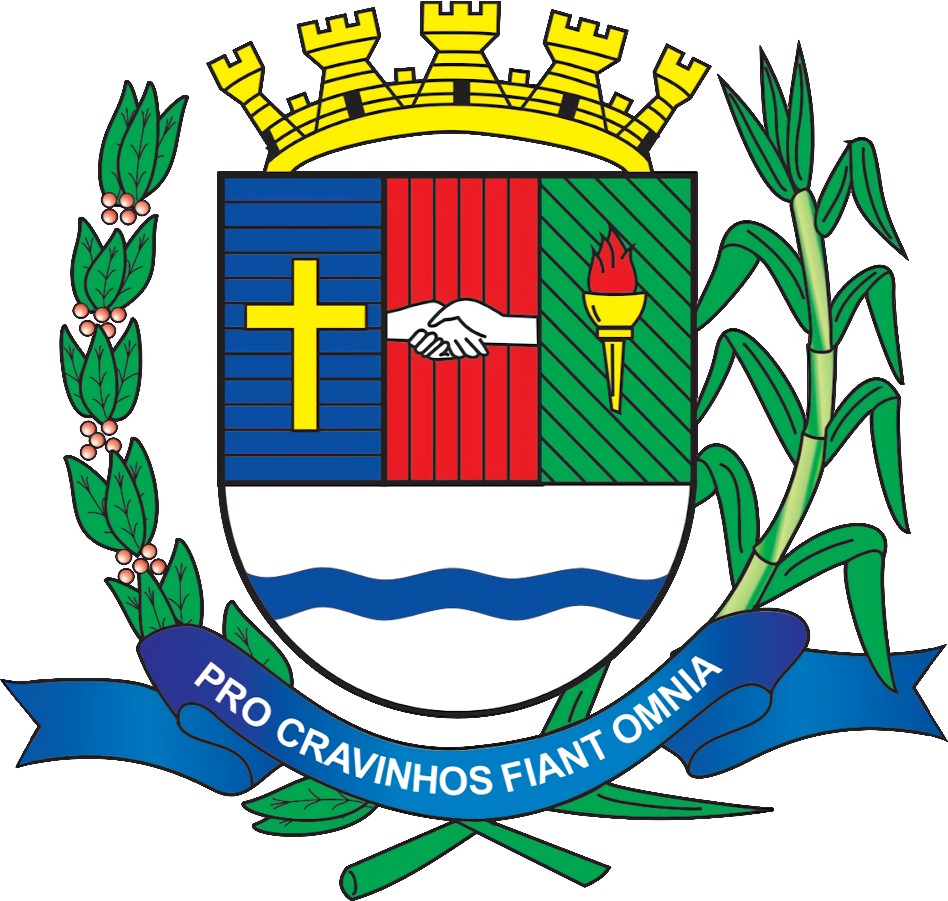
- Flag Coat of arms

- Location in São Paulo state

- Location in Brazil
- Coordinates: 21°20′25″S 47°43′46″W
- Country: Brazil
- Region: Southeast
- State: São Paulo

Area
  - Total: 311 km^{2} (120 sq mi)
- Elevation: 788 m (2,585 ft)

Population (2020)
  - Total: 35,579
  - Density: 114/km^{2} (296/sq mi)
- Time zone: UTC−3 (BRT)

Cravinhos is a municipality in the state of São Paulo in Brazil. The population is 35,579 (2020 estimate) in an area of 311 km^{2} (120 sq mi). The elevation is 788 m.

== Media ==
In telecommunications, the city was served by Companhia Telefônica Brasileira until 1973, when it began to be served by Telecomunicações de São Paulo. In July 1998, this company was acquired by Telefónica, which adopted the Vivo brand in 2012.

The company is currently an operator of cell phones, fixed lines, internet (fiber optics/4G) and television (satellite and cable).

== See also ==
- List of municipalities in São Paulo
- Interior of São Paulo
