= Miullen =

Brazilian footballer

Personal information
- Full name: Miullen Nathã Felício Carvalho
- Date of birth: 19 May 1998 (age 28)
- Place of birth: Uberlândia, Brazil
- Height: 1.80 m (5 ft 11 in)
- Position: Forward

Team information
- Current team: Erbil SC
- Number: 9

Youth career
- 2012−2017: Corinthians
- 2017−2018: Londrina

Senior career*
Years	Team	Apps	(Gls)
2018−2020	Londrina	14	(1)
2018	→Chapecoense (loan)	0	(0)
2020−2022	Gil Vicente	8	(0)
2022−2023	Botafogo-PB	2	(0)
2023	Santa Cruz FC	4	(1)
2024	Azuriz	5	(1)
2024−2026	Hibernians	35	(9)
- * Club domestic league appearances and goals as of 4 October 2026

Miullen Nathã Felício Carvalho (born 19 May 1998), known simply as Miullen, is a Brazilian professional footballer who plays as a forward for the football section of Erbil SC. The club currently plays in the Iraq Stars League, the first-tier of Iraqi football.

== Professional career ==
Miullen moved to the youth academy of Corinthians in 2012, and transferred to Londrina in 2017. Miullen made his professional debut with Londrina in a 1-1 Campeonato Paranaense tie with Cianorte on 4 February 2018. On 22 August 2020, Miullen signed with Gil Vicente in the Primeira Liga.
