= Jaëll Hattu =

Dutch footballer (born 1998)

Personal information
- Date of birth: 15 February 1998 (age 28)
- Place of birth: Venlo, Netherlands
- Position: Midfielder

Youth career
- Quick Boys '31
- VVV
- 2013–2017: PSV
- 2019–2020: NEC

Senior career*
Years	Team	Apps	(Gls)
2017–2019	Jong PSV	14	(1)
2020–2021	1. FC Monheim	7	(0)
Total		21	(1)

International career
2013	Netherlands U15	2	(0)
2013	Netherlands U16	3	(0)
2015	Netherlands U17	1	(0)
- * Club domestic league appearances and goals

Jaëll Hattu (born 15 February 1998) is a Dutch retired footballer who played as a midfielder.

== Club career ==
After playing for VVV-Venlo, Hattu moved to PSV in 2013 and turned professional in July 2017. He made his professional debut with Jong PSV in the Eerste Divisie on 12 January 2018, replacing Lennerd Daneels in the 66th minute of a 2–1 loss to Helmond Sport. On 3 May 2019, he scored his first goal in professional football, helping Jong PSV to a 2–0 victory against Telstar. He left the club at the end of the 2019–29 season, as his contract expired.

Ahead of the 2019–20 season, Hattu joined Jong NEC.

In August 2020, Hattu joined German Oberliga Niederrhein club 1. FC Monheim after a successful three-week trial.

== International career ==
Hattu represented the Netherlands at youth international level, and was capped at under-15, under-16, and under-17 levels.
