= 2026–27 Young Lions F.C. season =

Young Lions
2026–27 season
- Head coach: Firdaus Kasman
- Ground: Jalan Besar Stadium
- Singapore Premier League: TBA
- Singapore Cup: TBA
Home colours	Away colours

The 2026–27 season is Young Lions' 23rd consecutive season in the top flight of Singapore football and in the Singapore Premier League. The club will also compete in the Singapore Cup.

== Squad ==
=== Singapore Premier League ===
As of 13 Aug 2026.

Squad No.	Name	Nationality	Date of Birth (Age)	Last Club	Contract Start	Contract End
Goalkeepers
1	Izwan Mahbud	(Singapore)	14 July 1990 (age 36)	(Singapore) Lion City Sailors	2026	2027
12	Ainun Nuha Ilyasir	(Singapore)	11 March 2006 (age 20)	(Singapore) Lion City Sailors U21	2025	2026
13	Benjamin Žerak	(Slovenia)	14 December 2006 (age 19)	(Singapore) Lion City Sailors	2026	2027
30	Jeremy Quan Jun En	(Singapore)	4 July 2006 (age 20)	(Singapore) FC Jurong U19	2026	2027
45	Kenneth Ng	(Singapore)	6 February 2009 (age 17)	(Singapore) Lion City Sailors	2026	2027
46	Seth Lee	(Singapore)	12 January 2007 (age 19)	(Singapore) Lion City Sailors	2026	2027
	Ashman Saravanan	(Malaysia) (Singapore)	5 March 2008 (age 18)	(Singapore) Lion City Sailors U21	2025	2026
Defenders
2	Fairuz Fazli Koh	(Singapore)	20 January 2005 (age 21)	Singapore Sports School	2022	2027
3	Luth Harith	(Singapore)	19 March 2008 (age 18)	(Singapore) Lion City Sailors U21	2025	2027
4	Shuya Yamashita	(Japan)	16 April 1999 (age 27)	(Singapore) Tampines Rovers	2026	2027
5	Ikram Mikhail Mustaqim	(Singapore)	5 August 2005 (age 21)	(Singapore) Tanjong Pagar United U21	2023	2027
11	Hafiz Nor	(Singapore)	22 August 1988 (age 38)	(Singapore) Lion City Sailors	2026	2027
17	Iryan Fandi	(Singapore) (South Africa)	9 August 2006 (age 20)	(Singapore) Hougang United U21	2025	2027
28	Nur Muhammad Fadly	(Singapore)	30 May 2007 (age 19)	(Singapore) Lion City Sailors U21	2025	2027
29	Iliya Naufal	(Singapore)	6 July 2008 (age 18)	(Singapore) Lion City Sailors U21	2025	2027
41	Erdy Taha Thaqib	(Singapore)	18 November 2009 (age 17)	Singapore Sports School	2025	2027
42	Jovan Ang	(Singapore)	23 August 2006 (age 20)	(Singapore) BG Tampines Rovers U21	2025	2027
43	Ayden Haziq Syaifuallah	(Singapore)	27 September 2009 (age 17)	(Singapore) Lion City Sailors U17	2025	2027
44	Ilhan Rizqullah	(Singapore)	17 September 2008 (age 18)	(Singapore) Lion City Sailors U21	2025	2027
66	Abdil Qaiyyim Mutalib	(Singapore)	14 May 1989 (age 37)	(Singapore) Balestier Khalsa	2026	2027
	Idzham Eszuan	(Singapore)	14 February 2007 (age 19)	(Singapore) Lion City Sailors U21	2025	2027
Midfielders
6	Ajay Robson	(Singapore)	6 December 2003 (age 22)	(Singapore) Hougang United	2025	2027
7	Nathan Mao	(Singapore)	26 March 2008 (age 18)	(Singapore) Lion City Sailors U21	2025	2027
8	Kai Whitmore	(Wales)	25 March 2001 (age 25)	(Wales) Newport County	2026	2027
10	Daisuke Sakai	(Japan)	18 January 1997 (age 29)	(Indonesia) PSM Makassar	2026	2027
14	Danial Herwan Ukail	(Singapore) (Australia)	19 September 2008 (age 18)	(Australia) Melbourne City Academy	2026	2027
15	Toi Kagami	(Japan)	15 February 1999 (age 27)	(Japan) Thespa Gunma	2026	2027
16	Andy Reefqy	(Singapore)	14 July 2008 (age 18)	(Singapore) Lion City Sailors U21	2025	2027
20	Rae Peh Jun Wen	(Singapore)	15 September 2008 (age 18)	(Singapore) Tampines Rovers	2026	2027
21	Harith Danish Irwan	(Singapore)	27 November 2008 (age 17)	(Singapore) Lion City Sailors U21	2025	2027
22	Joel Chew	(Singapore)	9 February 2000 (age 26)	(Singapore) Tampines Rovers	2026	2027
25	Caelan Cheong Tze Jay	(Singapore)	22 January 2006 (age 20)	(Singapore) BG Tampines Rovers U21	2025	2027
26	Nyqil Iyyan	(Singapore)	26 June 2008 (age 18)	Singapore Sports School	2024	2027
27	Sarrvin Raj	(Singapore)	5 April 2008 (age 18)	(Singapore) Lion City Sailors U21	2025	2027
31	Aryan Sahib	(Singapore)	12 September 2009 (age 17)	(Singapore) Lion City Sailors U17	2025	2027
32	Kieran Tan Yi An	(Singapore)	1 January 2008 (age 18)	(Singapore) Tampines Rovers	2026	2027
35	Elijah Srinivasa	(Singapore) (United States)	9 June 2009 (age 17)	(Singapore)	2026	2027
36	Hisatoshi Nishido	(Japan)	27 March 2001 (age 25)	(Japan) Renofa Yamaguchi	2026	2027
37	Josh Tan Jiunn Fonn	(Singapore)	10 August 2005 (age 21)	(Singapore) Geylang International	2026	2027
39	Scheinemann Wei	(Singapore) (Germany)		(Singapore)	2026	2027
40	Loo Kai Sheng	(Singapore)	9 January 2007 (age 19)	(Spain) ESC La Liga Academy	2024	2027
47	Ryan Vishal	(Singapore)	25 January 2007 (age 19)	(Singapore) Sailors Development Center U17	2024	2027
48	Zaki Jumlan	(Singapore)	1 January 2009 (age 17)	(Singapore) National Development Center	2026	2027
49	Fernandez Casey Klein	(Singapore) (Germany)	5 February 2007 (age 19)	(Singapore) Lion City Sailors U21	2025	2027
	Adam Reefdy	(Singapore)	8 May 2004 (age 22)	(Singapore) Hougang United U21	2025	2026
Forwards
9	Miyu Sato	(Japan)	19 July 2000 (age 26)	(Japan) FC Ryukyu	2026	2027
23	Sahoo Garv	(Singapore)	26 March 2006 (age 20)	(Singapore) Balestier Khalsa U21	2023	2027
24	Louka Tan-Vaissiere	(Singapore) (France)	13 June 2005 (age 21)	(Singapore) Hougang United U21	2025	2027
33	Farrel Farhan	(Singapore)	15 March 2009 (age 17)	(Singapore) Lion City Sailors U21	2025	2027
34	Lukyan Tan-Vaissiere	(Singapore) (France)	13 May 2009 (age 17)	(Spain) Rayo Ciudad Alcobendas Academy	2025	2027
38	Uchenna Eziakor	(Singapore) (Nigeria)	17 May 2008 (age 18)	(Spain) ESC La Liga Academy	2025	2027
58	Adam Irfan	(Singapore) (Indonesia)		(Singapore) Geylang International	2026	2026
	Nicolas Michael Beninger	(Singapore) (France)	4 July 2006 (age 20)	(Singapore) BG Tampines Rovers U21	2025	2026
Players who left during the season
Players who left for NS during season

== Coaching staff ==
Position	Name
Team Manager	(Singapore) Matthew Sean (Singapore) Sakthi Vel Ganesan
Team Manager (SPL2)	(Singapore) Syed Azmi
Head team coach	(Singapore) Firdaus Kassim
Assistant coach	(Singapore) Hafiz Sujad (Singapore) Tengku Mushadad
Head Coach (SPL2 & U19)	(Singapore) Syed Azmi
Goalkeeping coach	(Slovenia) Matija Radikon
Goalkeeping Coach (SPL2 & U19)	
Performance Coach	(Germany) Lewin Kösterke
Performance coach (SPL2 & U19)	
Individual Coach	
Individual coach (SPL2 & U19)	
Condition coach	(Singapore) (Indonesia) Chloe Alphonso
Condition coach (SPL2 & U19)	
Head of Medical	(Netherlands) Wouter de Vroome
Equipment Officer	(Singapore) Omar Mohamed
Match Analyst	
Video Analyst	(Spain) Miguel García

== Transfer ==
=== In ===
Pre-Season

Date (Note: Date of club's announcement, else will be 1 Jun-2025, the date which the free agent start due to lapse of previous contract)	Position	Player	Transferred from	Ref
Permanent Transfer
14 April 2026	MF	(Wales) Kai Whitmore	Free Agent	N.A.
1 July 2026	GK	(Singapore) Izwan Mahbud	(Singapore) Lion City Sailors	Free
31 July 2026	MF	(Singapore) Rae Peh	(Singapore) Tampines Rovers	Free
4 August 2026	DF	(Japan) Shuya Yamashita	(Singapore) Tampines Rovers	Free
8 August 2026	MF	(Singapore) Hafiz Nor	(Singapore) Lion City Sailors	Free
18 August 2026	MF	(Singapore) Josh Tan	(Singapore) Geylang International	Free
24 August 2026	FW	(Japan) Miyu Sato	(Japan) FC Ryukyu	Free
27 August 2026	FW	(Japan) Toi Kagami	(Japan) Thespa Gunma	Free
Loan Transfer
1 July 2026	GK	(Singapore) (Malaysia) Ashman Saravanan	(Singapore) Lion City Sailors U21	Season loan
1 July 2026	DF	(Singapore) Luth Harith	(Singapore) SAFSA (via. LCS U21)	Season loan
1 July 2026	DF	(Singapore) Idzham Eszuan	(Singapore) SAFSA (via. LCS U21)	Season loan
1 July 2026	DF	(Singapore) Ilhan Rizqullah	(Singapore) SAFSA (via. LCS U21)	Season loan
1 July 2026	DF	(Singapore) Nur Muhammad Fadly	(Singapore) SAFSA (via. LCS U21)	Season loan
1 July 2026	DF	(Singapore) (South Africa) Iryan Fandi	(Singapore) SAFSA (via. Hougang)	Season loan
1 July 2026	MF	(Singapore) Ajay Robson	(Singapore) SAFSA (via. Hougang)	Season loan
1 July 2026	MF	(Singapore) Caelan Cheong Tze Jay	(Singapore) SAFSA (via. Tampines U21)	Season loan
1 July 2026	MF	(Singapore) Andy Reefdy	(Singapore) SAFSA (via. LCS U21)	Season loan
1 July 2026	MF	(Singapore) Harith Danish Irwan	(Singapore) SAFSA (via. LCS U21)	Season loan
1 July 2026	FW	(Singapore) (Nigeria) Uchenna Eziakor	(Singapore) SAFSA (via. LCS U21)	Season loan
1 July 2026	FW	(Singapore) (Germany) Fernandez Casey Klein	(Singapore) SAFSA (via. LCS U21)	Season loan
1 July 2026	FW	(Singapore) (France) Louka Tan-Vaissiere	(Singapore) SAFSA (via. Hougang)	Season loan
26 July 2026	GK	(Slovenia) Benjamin Žerak	(Singapore) Lion City Sailors	Season loan
30 July 2026	GK	(Singapore) Kenneth Ng	(Singapore) Lion City Sailors	Season loan
30 July 2026	GK	(Singapore) Jeremy Quan Jun En	(Singapore) SAFSA (via. FC Jurong)	Season loan
30 July 2026	MF	(Singapore) Aryan Sahib	(Singapore) Lion City Sailors	Season loan
7 August 2026	GK	(Singapore) Seth Lee	(Singapore) Lion City Sailors	Season loan
7 August 2026	MF	(Singapore) Farrel Farhan	(Singapore) Lion City Sailors	Season loan
7 August 2026	MF	(Singapore) Kieran Tan Yi An	(Singapore) SAFSA (via. Tampines U21)	Season loan
30 August 2026	MF	(Singapore) Joel Chew	(Singapore) Tampines Rovers	Loan till Dec-2026
6 September 2026	FW	(Japan) Hisatoshi Nishido	(Japan) Renofa Yamaguchi	Season loan
6 September 2026	FW	(Japan) Daisuke Sakai	(Indonesia) PSM Makassar	Season loan

Mid-season

Date (Note: Date of club's announcement, will be either date of club announcement or 1 Jun-2025, the date which the free agent start due to lapse of previous contract)	Position	Player	Transferred from	Ref
Permanent Transfer
Loan Transfer

=== Out ===
Pre-Season

Date (Note: Date of club's announcement, else will be 1 Jun-2025, the date which the free agent start due to lapse of previous contract)	Position	Player	Transferred To	Ref
Permanent Transfer
30 June 2026	GK	(Singapore) Izwan Mahbud	(Singapore) Lion City Sailors	End of loan
30 June 2026	GK	(Singapore) (Malaysia) Ashman Saravanan	(Singapore) Lion City Sailors U21	End of loan
30 June 2026	GK	(Singapore) Ainun Nuha Ilyasir	(Singapore) Lion City Sailors U21	End of loan
30 June 2026	GK	(Singapore) Issac Goh Jun Yang	(Singapore) Lion City Sailors U21	End of loan (Note: Issac Goh returns to LCS Reserve team to play mainly for the SPL2 team.)
30 June 2026	GK	(Singapore) Ilhan Hady	(Singapore) Lion City Sailors U21	End of loan (Note: Ilhan Hady returns to LCS Reserve team to play mainly for the SPL2 team.)
30 June 2026	GK	(Singapore) Travis Ang	(Singapore) Tanjong Pagar United	Free
30 June 2026	DF	(Singapore) (Nigeria) Levi Faris Alfa	(Singapore) Balestier Khalsa	End of loan
30 June 2026	DF	(Singapore) Aqil Yazid	(Singapore) Hougang United	End of loan
30 June 2026	DF	(Singapore) Andrew Aw	(Singapore) Tampines Rovers	End of loan (Note: Andrew moves to FC Jurong as he was released after returning to Tampines Rovers.)
30 June 2026	DF	(Singapore) (South Africa) Iryan Fandi	(Singapore) SAFSA (via. Hougang)	End of loan
30 June 2026	DF	(Singapore) Idzham Eszuan	(Singapore) SAFSA (via. LCS U21)	End of loan
30 June 2026	DF	(Singapore) Nur Muhammad Fadly	(Singapore) SAFSA (via. LCS U21)	End of loan
30 June 2026	DF	(Singapore) Aqil Khusni	(Singapore) SAFSA (via. LCS U21)	End of loan
30 June 2026	DF	(Singapore) Luth Harith	(Singapore) SAFSA (via. LCS U21)	End of loan
30 June 2026	DF	(Singapore) Ilhan Rizqullah	(Singapore) Lion City Sailors U21	End of loan
30 June 2026	DF	(Singapore) Marcus Mosses	(Singapore) Lion City Sailors U21	End of loan (Note: Marcus Mosses returns to LCS, was released and signed for Tanjong Pagar United.)
30 June 2026	DF	(Singapore) Iliya Naufal	(Singapore) Lion City Sailors U21	End of loan
30 June 2026	DF	(Brazil) Enrico Walmrath Silveira	(Singapore) Lion City Sailors U21	End of loan (Note: Enrico returns to LCS and was released.)
30 June 2026	DF	(Brazil) Joilson Lucas	(Brazil)	Free
30 June 2026	MF	(Brazil) Abner Vinicius	(Saudi Arabia) Al-Arabi	Free
30 June 2026	FW	(Brazil) Sergio Mendonça	(Indonesia) Isenmulang Kalteng	Free
30 June 2026	FW	(Singapore) (France) Louka Tan-Vaissiere	(Singapore) SAFSA (via. Hougang)	End of loan
30 June 2026	FW	(Singapore) Izrafil Yusof	(Singapore) SAFSA (via. LCS U21)	End of loan (Note: Izrafil Yusof returns to LCS Reserve team to play mainly for the SPL2 team.)
30 June 2026	FW	(Singapore) (Nigeria) Uchenna Eziakor	(Singapore) SAFSA (via. LCS U21)	End of loan
30 June 2026	FW	(Singapore) (Iran) (England) Kian Ghadessy	(Singapore) SAFSA (via. LCS U21)	End of loan
30 June 2026	FW	(Singapore) (Germany) Fernandez Casey Klein	(Singapore) SAFSA (via. LCS U21)	End of loan
30 June 2026	FW	(Singapore) (France) Nicolas Michael Beninger	(Singapore) SAFSA (via. Tampines U21)	End of loan
30 June 2026	FW	(Singapore) Syazwan Latiff	(Singapore) SAFSA (via. Geylang U21)	End of loan
30 June 2026	FW	(England) Harry Spence	(Singapore) Lion City Sailors U21	End of loan
30 June 2026	FW	(Singapore) Tyler Matthew Ho Zheng Yu	(Singapore) Lion City Sailors U21	End of loan
30 June 2026	FW	(Singapore) Adam Irfan	(Singapore) Geylang International U21	End of loan
30 June 2026	FW	(Singapore) Amir Syafiz	(Singapore) Hougang United	End of loan
30 June 2026	MF	(Singapore) Rauf Anaqi	(Singapore) Albirex Niigata (S)	End of loan
30 June 2026	MF	(Singapore) Christopher Lee	(Singapore) Hougang United	End of loan
30 June 2026	MF	(Republic of Ireland) (Japan) Joshua Little	(Singapore) Lion City Sailors	End of loan
30 June 2026	MF	(Singapore) Sarrvin Raj	(Singapore) Lion City Sailors U21	End of loan
30 June 2026	MF	(Singapore) Andy Reefqy	(Singapore) Lion City Sailors U21	End of loan
30 June 2026	MF	(Singapore) Aryan Sahib	(Singapore) Lion City Sailors U21	End of loan
30 June 2026	MF	(Singapore) Jeff Lam	(Singapore) Tanjong Pagar United	Free
30 June 2026	MF	(Singapore) Ajay Robson	(Singapore) SAFSA (via. Hougang)	End of loan
30 June 2026	MF	(Singapore) Harith Danish Irwan	(Singapore) SAFSA (via. LCS U21)	End of loan
30 June 2026	MF	(Singapore) Caelan Cheong Tze Jay	(Singapore) SAFSA (via. Tampines U21)	End of loan
30 June 2026	MF	(Singapore) Jovan Ang	(Singapore) SAFSA (via. Tampines U21)	End of loan
12 August 2026	DF	(Singapore) Kieran Teo Jia Jun	(Singapore) Tanjong Pagar United	Free
Loan Transfer

=== Retained ===
Position	Player	Ref

== Friendly ==
=== Pre-season friendly ===
Win Draw Loss

4 October 2026 1	Young Lions (Singapore)	0–3	(Singapore) Tanjong Pagar United	Bedok
				Stadium: Bedok Stadium

== Team statistics ==
=== Appearances and goals ===
As of 21 November 26

Numbers in parentheses denote appearances as substitute.

No.	Pos.	Player	Sleague		Singapore Cup		Total	
No.	Pos.	Player	Apps.	Goals	Apps.	Goals	Apps.	Goals
1	GK	(Singapore) Izwan Mahbud	5	0	0	0	5	0
2	MF	(Singapore) Fairuz Fazli Koh	6	0	0	0	6	0
3	DF	(Singapore) Luth Harith	1+1	0	0	0	2	0
4	DF	(Japan) Shuya Yamashita	7	1	0	0	7	1
5	DF	(Singapore) Ikram Mikhail Mustaqim	3+1	0	0	0	4	0
6	MF	(Singapore) Ajay Robson	1+2	0	0	0	3	0
7	FW	(Singapore) Nathan Mao	4+1	0	0	0	5	0
8	MF	(Wales) Kai Whitmore	5+2	0	0	0	7	0
9	FW	(Japan) Miyu Sato	1+1	1	0	0	2	1
10	MF	(Japan) Daisuke Sakai	4	1	0	0	4	1
11	MF	(Singapore) Hafiz Nor	2+4	0	0	0	6	0
12	GK	(Singapore) Ainun Nuha Ilyasir	0	0	0	0	0	0
13	GK	(Slovenia) Benjamin Žerak	1+1	0	0	0	2	0
14	MF	(Singapore) (Australia) Danial Herwan	0+1	0	0	0	1	0
15	MF	(Japan) Toi Kagami	5+1	2	0	0	6	2
16	DF	(Singapore) Andy Reefqy	6+1	0	0	0	7	0
17	DF	(Singapore) (South Africa) Iryan Fandi	5+2	0	0	0	7	0
20	MF	(Singapore) Rae Peh Jun Wen	0+1	0	0	0	1	0
21	MF	(Singapore) Harith Danish Irwan	1+1	0	0	0	2	0
22	MF	(Singapore) Joel Chew	6	0	0	0	6	0
23	FW	(Singapore) Sahoo Garv	5+1	0	0	0	6	0
24	FW	(Singapore) (France) Louka Tan-Vaissiere	1	0	0	0	1	0
25	MF	(Singapore) Caelan Cheong Tze Jay	0	0	0	0	0	0
26	MF	(Singapore) Nyqil Iyyan	0	0	0	0	0	0
27	FW	(Singapore) Sarrvin Raj	1+3	0	0	0	4	0
28	DF	(Singapore) Nur Muhammad Fadly	0+1	0	0	0	1	0
29	DF	(Singapore) Iliya Naufal	0	0	0	0	0	0
30	GK	(Singapore) Jeremy Quan Jun En	0	0	0	0	0	0
31	MF	(Singapore) Aryan Sahib	0	0	0	0	0	0
32	MF	(Singapore) Kieran Tan Yi An	0	0	0	0	0	0
33	MF	(Singapore) Farrel Farhan	0	0	0	0	0	0
34	FW	(Singapore) (France) Lukyan Tan-Vaissiere	0+4	0	0	0	4	0
35	MF	(Singapore) (United States) Elijah Srinivasa	0+1	0	0	0	1	0
36	MF	(Japan) Hisatoshi Nishido	6+1	3	0	0	7	3
37	MF	(Singapore) Josh Tan Jiunn Fonn	0	0	0	0	0	0
38	FW	(Singapore) (Nigeria) Uchenna Eziakor	0	0	0	0	0	0
39	FW	(Singapore) (Germany) Scheinemann Wei	0	0	0	0	0	0
40	MF	(Singapore) Loo Kai Sheng	0	0	0	0	0	0
41	DF	(Singapore) Erdy Taha Thaqib	0	0	0	0	0	0
42	DF	(Singapore) Jovan Ang	0	0	0	0	0	0
43	DF	(Singapore) Ayden Haziq Syaifuallah	0	0	0	0	0	0
44	DF	(Singapore) Ilhan Rizqullah	0	0	0	0	0	0
45	GK	(Singapore) Kenneth Ng	1+1	0	0	0	2	0
46	GK	(Singapore) Seth Lee	0	0	0	0	0	0
47	MF	(Singapore) Ryan Vishal	0	0	0	0	0	0
48	MF	(Singapore) Zaki Jumlan	0	0	0	0	0	0
49	FW	(Singapore) (Germany) Fernandez Casey Klein	0	0	0	0	0	0
66	DF	(Singapore) Abdil Qaiyyim Mutalib	0+2	0	0	0	2	0
??	DF	(Singapore) Idzham Eszuan	0	0	0	0	0	0
??	DF	(Singapore) Adam Reefdy	0	0	0	0	0	0
Players who have played this season and/or sign for the season but had left the club or on loan to other club

== Competitions ==
=== Overview ===
Results summary

Overall								Home						Away					
Pld	W	D	L	GF	GA	GD	Pts	W	D	L	GF	GA	GD	W	D	L	GF	GA	GD
0	0	0	0	0	0	0	0	0	0	0	0	0	0	0	0	0	0	0	0

=== Singapore Premier League ===
Win Draw Loss

13 September 2026 1	Young Lions (Singapore)	0–4	(Singapore) FC Jurong	Jalan Besar
		Report	Toa Suenaga 15', 45+1'; Andrew Aw 81'; Shunsuke Ono 86'; Seo Seung-woo (yellow card) 5'; Lee Jae-yong (yellow card) 42'; Kodai Dohi (yellow card) 90+1'	Stadium: Jalan Besar Stadium; Referee: Syarqawi Buhari; Man of the Match: (Japan) Toa Suenaga

19 September 2026 2	Young Lions (Singapore)	1–5	(Singapore) Geylang International	Jalan Besar
	Hisatoshi Nishido 10'; Luth Harith (yellow card) 63'		Fairuz Fazli Koh 12' (o.g.); Ryang Hyon-ju 22', 90+2'; Dejan Račić 38'; Sahil Suhaimi 90+9'; Nazrul Nazari (yellow card) 73'	Stadium: Jalan Besar Stadium; Referee: Muhammad Zulfiqar; Man of the Match: (North Korea) Ryang Hyon-ju

11 October 2026 3	Lion City Sailors (Singapore)	6–1	(Singapore) Young Lions	Jalan Besar
	Bart Ramselaar 13'; Hugo Gomes 37'; Bailey Wright 51'; Ilhan Fandi 70'; Matthias Phaëton 73', 83'; Nur Adams (yellow card) 53'	Report	Toi Kagami 10'; Fairuz Fazli Koh (yellow card) 50'; Hisatoshi Nishido (yellow card) 53'; Andy Reefqy (yellow card) 90+1'	Stadium: Jalan Besar Stadium; Referee: Hilmi Fuad; Man of the Match: (Guadeloupe) (France) Matthias Phaëton

18 October 2026 4	Tampines Rovers (Singapore)	4–1	(Singapore) Young Lions	Tampines
	Faris Ramli 62'; Hide Higashikawa 71', 90+6'; Kenshin Yamazaki 82'		Daisuke Sakai 44' (pen.); Hafiz Nor (yellow card) 5'; Ikram Mikhail Mustaqim (yellow card) 66'	Stadium: Our Tampines Hub; Referee: Jansen Foo; Man of the Match: (Japan) Koya Kazama

24 October 2026 5	Young Lions (Singapore)	1–2	(Singapore) Balestier Khalsa	Jalan Besar
	Shuya Yamashita 45+4'; Iryan Fandi (yellow card) 45+7'; Ajay Robson (yellow card) 66'; Andy Reefqy (yellow card) 90+9'		Tin Matic 5'; Hiro Mizuguchi 22'; Woo Chun Wei (yellow card) 30'; Tajeli Salamat (yellow card) 38'	Stadium: Jalan Besar Stadium; Referee: Khairul Amri; Man of the Match: (Croatia) Jakov Katuša

31 October 2026 6	Hougang United (Singapore)	0–2	(Singapore) Young Lions	Bishan
	Saifullah Akbar (yellow card) 44'; Washington Jaramillo (yellow card) 77'	Report	Hisatoshi Nishido 4', 73'; Miyu Sato (penalty missed) 64 (yellow card) 85'; Fairuz Fazli (yellow card) 45+10'; Shuya Yamashita (yellow card) 51'	Stadium: Bishan Stadium; Referee: Aldrick Lee; Man of the Match: (Japan) Hisatoshi Nishido

21 November 2026 7	Young Lions (Singapore)	2–4	(Singapore) Tanjong Pagar United	Jalan Besar
	Miyu Sato 17'; Toi Kagami 38'		Naqiuddin Eunos 25'; Riku Fukashiro 30'; Boris Kopitovic 45+2' (pen.); Masahiro Sugita 68'	Stadium: Jalan Besar Stadium; Referee: Thawfeek Ahamad; Man of the Match: (Japan) Riku Fukashiro

29 November 2026 8	Young Lions (Singapore)	–	(Singapore) Lion City Sailors	Jalan Besar
				Stadium: Jalan Besar Stadium

14 February 2027 9	Tampines Rovers (Singapore)	–	(Singapore) Young Lions	Tampines
				Stadium: Our Tampines Hub

20 February 2027 10	FC Jurong (Singapore)	–	(Singapore) Young Lions	Jurong East
				Stadium: Jurong East Stadium

27 February 2027 11	Young Lions (Singapore)	–	(Singapore) Balestier Khalsa	Jalan Besar
				Stadium: Jalan Besar Stadium

7 March 2027 12	Tanjong Pagar United (Singapore)	–	(Singapore) Young Lions	Jurong East
				Stadium: Jurong East Stadium

13 March 2027 13	Young Lions (Singapore)	–	(Singapore) Hougang United	Jalan Besar
				Stadium: Jalan Besar Stadium

23 January 2027 14 (Rescheduled)	Geylang International (Singapore)	–	(Singapore) Young Lions	Tampines
				Stadium: Our Tampines Hub

3 April 2027 15	Balestier Khalsa (Singapore)	–	(Singapore) Young Lions	Bishan
				Stadium: Bishan Stadium

31 January 2027 16 (Rescheduled)	Young Lions (Singapore)	–	(Singapore) Tampines Rovers	Jalan Besar
				Stadium: Jalan Besar Stadium

18 April 2027 17	Lion City Sailors (Singapore)	–	(Singapore) Young Lions	Jalan Besar
				Stadium: Jalan Besar Stadium

25 April 2027 18	FC Jurong (Singapore)	–	(Singapore) Young Lions	Jurong East
				Stadium: Jurong East Stadium

2 May 2027 19	Young Lions (Singapore)	–	(Singapore) Tanjong Pagar United	Jalan Besar
				Stadium: Jalan Besar Stadium

9 May 2027 20	Geylang International (Singapore)	–	(Singapore) Young Lions	Tampines
				Stadium: Our Tampines Hub

16 May 2027 21	Young Lions (Singapore)	–	(Singapore) Hougang United	Jalan Besar
				Stadium: Jalan Besar Stadium

Pos	Teams	Pld	W	D	L	GF	GA	GD	Pts
1	Lion City Sailors	6	5	1	0	25	3	+22	16
2	Tampines Rovers	6	5	1	0	18	3	+15	16
3	Geylang International	7	4	2	1	12	7	+5	14
4	FC Jurong	7	3	1	3	14	11	+3	10
5	Tanjong Pagar United	7	3	1	3	11	18	−7	10
6	Balestier Khalsa	7	2	1	4	9	15	−6	7
7	Young Lions (Note: Young Lions are not eligible to represent Singapore in AFC club competitions.)	7	1	0	6	8	25	−17	3
8	Hougang United	7	0	1	6	4	19	−15	1

Updated to match(es) played on 22 November 2026. Source: Singapore Premier League
Rules for classification: 1) Points; 2) goal difference; 3) goals scored; 4) wins

== Competition (SPL2) ==
Win Draw Loss

24 August 2026 1	FC Jurong (Singapore)	7–0	(Singapore) Young Lions	Jurong East
	Takuma Yamaguchi 12'; Toa Suenaga 13', 32'; Akram Azman 58' (yellow card) 22'; Aloysius Pang 74'; Tyler Matthew Ho Zheng Yu 76' (yellow card) 90'; Ahmad Martin 84'; Seiya Satsukida (yellow card) 45+4'	Report	Erdy Taha (yellow card) 86'	Stadium: Jurong East Stadium

29 August 2026 2	Young Lions (Singapore)	2–0	(Singapore) Balestier Khalsa	Bukit Gombak
	Nathan Mao 45' (yellow card) 67'; Toi Kagami 90'; Garv Sahoo (yellow card) 33'; Erdy Taha (yellow card) 52'		Shaddiq Mansor (yellow card) 90+3'	Stadium: Bukit Gombak Stadium

2 September 2026 3	Tanjong Pagar United (Singapore)	0–8	(Singapore) Young Lions	Jurong East
	Daniyal Lynn Rasor (yellow card) 67'; Anaqee Basheer (yellow card) 80'		Hisatoshi Nishido 5'; Louka Tan 8', 37', 40', 42', 90+2'; Toi Kagami 17'; Fairuz Fazli 25'	Stadium: Jurong East Stadium

30 November 2026 4 (Rescheduled)	Young Lions (Singapore)	–	(Singapore) Tampines Rovers	Tampines
				Stadium: Our Tampines Hub

23 November 2026 5 (Rescheduled)	Young Lions (Singapore)	–	(Singapore) Geylang International	Bedok
				Stadium: Bedok Stadium

9 December 2026 6 (Rescheduled)	Hougang United (Singapore)	–	(Singapore) Young Lions	Tampines
				Stadium: Our Tampines Hub

5 December 2026 7	Young Lions (Singapore)	–	(Singapore) Lion City Sailors	Bedok
				Stadium: Bedok Stadium

12 December 2026 8	Young Lions (Singapore)	–	(Singapore) FC Jurong	Jurong East
				Stadium: Jurong East Stadium

16 December 2026 9	Balestier Khalsa (Singapore)	–	(Singapore) Young Lions	Bishan
				Stadium: Bishan Stadium

20 December 2026 10	Tanjong Pagar United (Singapore)	–	(Singapore) Young Lions	Jurong East
				Stadium: Jurong East Stadium

5 January 2027 11	Young Lions (Singapore)	–	(Singapore) Tampines Rovers	Tampines
				Stadium: Our Tampines Hub

8 January 2027 12	Geylang International (Singapore)	–	(Singapore) Young Lions	Bedok
				Stadium: Bedok Stadium

12 January 2027 13	Hougang United (Singapore)	–	(Singapore) Young Lions	Choa Chu Kang
				Stadium: Choa Chu Kang Stadium

16 January 2027 14	Young Lions (Singapore)	–	(Singapore) Lion City Sailors	Bedok
				Stadium: Bedok Stadium

20 January 2027 15	FC Jurong (Singapore)	–	(Singapore) Young Lions	Jurong East
				Stadium: Jurong East Stadium

24 January 2027 16	Young Lions (Singapore)	–	(Singapore) Balestier Khalsa	Bishan
				Stadium: Bishan Stadium

30 January 2027 17	Young Lions (Singapore)	–	(Singapore) Tanjong Pagar United	Jurong East
				Stadium: Jurong East Stadium

3 February 2027 18	Tampines Rovers (Singapore)	–	(Singapore) Young Lions	Tampines
				Stadium: Our Tampines Hub

22 February 2027 19	Young Lions (Singapore)	–	(Singapore) Geylang International	Bedok
				Stadium: Bedok Stadium

1 March 2027 20	Young Lions (Singapore)	–	(Singapore) Hougang United	Bukit Gombak
				Stadium: Bukit Gombak Stadium

5 April 2027 21	Lion City Sailors (Singapore)	–	(Singapore) Young Lions	Bedok
				Stadium: Bedok Stadium

Pos	Team	Pld	W	D	L	GF	GA	GD	Pts	Qualification or relegation
1	Geylang International II	6	5	0	1	19	2	+17	15	Champion
2	Balestier Khalsa II	6	4	1	1	10	7	+3	13	
3	Tampines Rovers II	5	4	0	1	18	5	+13	12	
4	Young Lions B	3	2	0	1	10	7	+3	6	
5	FC Jurong II	5	1	1	3	11	12	−1	4	
6	Hougang United II	5	1	1	3	5	13	−8	4	
7	Tanjong Pagar United II	6	1	1	4	8	24	−16	4	
8	Lion City Sailors II	6	1	0	5	7	18	−11	3	

First match(es) will be played: 6 November 2026. Source: Singapore Premier League 2
Rules for classification: 1) points; 2) goal difference; 3) number of goals scored; 4) number of wins
