= 2025–26 Young Lions F.C. season =

Young Lions
2025–26 season
- Head coach: Nazri Nasir
- Ground: Jalan Besar Stadium
- Singapore Premier League: TBA
- Singapore Cup: TBA
Home colours	Away colours

The 2025–26 season is Young Lions' 22nd consecutive season in the top flight of Singapore football and in the Singapore Premier League. The club will also compete in the Singapore Cup.

== Squad ==
=== Singapore Premier League ===
As of 13 Mar 2024.

Squad No.	Name	Nationality	Date of Birth (Age)	Last Club	Contract Start	Contract End
Goalkeepers
12	Ainun Nuha Ilyasir	(Singapore)	11 March 2006 (age 20)	(Singapore) Lion City Sailors U21	2025	2026
31	Izwan Mahbud	(Singapore)	14 July 1990 (age 36)	(Singapore) Lion City Sailors	2026	2026
32	Ashman Saravanan	(Malaysia) (Singapore)	5 March 2008 (age 18)	(Singapore) Lion City Sailors U21	2025	2026
35	Firman Nabil	(Singapore)	27 March 2005 (age 21)	(Japan) Albirex Niigata (S) U21	2024	2026
68	Issac Goh Jun Yang	(Singapore)	5 June 2007 (age 19)	(Singapore) Lion City Sailors U17	2026	2026
	Ilhan Hady	(Singapore)	19 March 2010 (age 16)	(Singapore) Lion City Sailors U17	2025	2026
	Naqeeb Shawaluddin	(Singapore)	23 August 2010 (age 15)	(Singapore) Lion City Sailors U17	2025	2026
	Travis Ang Jia Zheng	(Singapore)	23 October 2004 (age 21)	(Singapore) Tanjong Pagar United U21	2024	2026
Defenders
4	Joilson Lucas	(Brazil)	18 January 2003 (age 23)	(Brazil) SD Juazeirense (B4)	2025	2026
5	Enrico Walmrath Silveira	(Brazil)	6 April 2006 (age 20)	(Singapore) Lion City Sailors U21	2025	2026
8	Andrew Aw	(Singapore)	29 March 2003 (age 23)	(Singapore) BG Tampines Rovers U21	2023	2026
15	Marcus Mosses	(Singapore)	21 January 2005 (age 21)	(Singapore) Tanjong Pagar United	2025	2026
17	Iryan Fandi	(Singapore)	9 August 2006 (age 19)	(Singapore) Hougang United U21	2025	2026
19	Aqil Yazid	(Singapore)	9 January 2004 (age 22)	(Singapore) Balestier Khalsa U21	2023	2026
20	Fairuz Fazli Koh	(Singapore)	20 January 2005 (age 21)	Singapore Sports School	2022	2026
21	Kieran Teo Jia Jun	(Singapore)	6 April 2004 (age 22)	(Singapore) Geylang International U21	2023	2026
26	Iliya Naufal	(Singapore)	6 July 2008 (age 18)	(Singapore) Lion City Sailors U21	2025	2026
36	Idzham Eszuan	(Singapore)	14 February 2007 (age 19)	(Singapore) Lion City Sailors U21	2025	2026
37	Ikram Mikhail Mustaqim	(Singapore)	5 August 2005 (age 20)	(Singapore) Tanjong Pagar United U21	2023	2026
38	Ilhan Rizqullah	(Singapore)	17 September 2008 (age 17)	(Singapore) Lion City Sailors U21	2025	2026
40	Jovan Ang	(Singapore)	23 August 2006 (age 19)	(Singapore) BG Tampines Rovers U21	2025	2026
46	Luth Harith	(Singapore)	19 March 2008 (age 18)	(Singapore) Lion City Sailors U21	2025	2026
48	Nur Muhammad Fadly	(Singapore)	30 May 2007 (age 19)	(Singapore) Lion City Sailors U21	2025	2026
53	Aqil M. Khusni	(Singapore)	23 April 2004 (age 22)	(Singapore) Lion City Sailors U21	2025	2026
56	Rauf Anaqi	(Singapore)	6 March 2008 (age 18)	(Singapore) Albirex Niigata (S)	2024	2026
57	Zaki Jumlan	(Singapore)	1 January 2009 (age 17)	(Singapore) National Development Center		
61	Ayden Haziq Syaifuallah	(Singapore)	27 September 2009 (age 16)	(Singapore) Lion City Sailors U17	2025	2026
65	Jeff Lam	(Singapore)		(Singapore) Balestier Khalsa B	2025	2026
66	Abdil Qaiyyim Mutalib	(Singapore)	14 May 1989 (age 37)	(Singapore) Balestier Khalsa	2026	2026
67	Levi Faris Alfa	(Singapore) (Nigeria)	31 May 2007 (age 19)	(Singapore) Balestier Khalsa	2026	2026
	Aaryan Azraqi Hermi	(Singapore)	24 February 2009 (age 17)	(Singapore) Lion City Sailors U17	2025	2026
	Jacas Tjhai Jun Heo	(Singapore)	5 January 2010 (age 16)	(Singapore) Lion City Sailors U17	2025	2026
Midfielders
3	Joshua Little	(Republic of Ireland) (Japan)	30 October 2007 (age 18)	(Singapore) Lion City Sailors U	2026	2026
6	Ajay Robson	(Singapore)	6 December 2003 (age 22)	(Singapore) Hougang United	2025	2026
7	Abner Vinicius	(Brazil)	15 January 2003 (age 23)	(Brazil) Bangu (B4)	2025	2026
11	Harry Spence	(England)	15 March 2006 (age 20)	(Singapore) Lion City Sailors U21	2025	2026
29	Caelan Cheong Tze Jay	(Singapore)	22 January 2006 (age 20)	(Singapore) BG Tampines Rovers U21	2025	2026
30	Fernandez Casey Klein	(Singapore) (Germany)	5 February 2007 (age 19)	(Singapore) Lion City Sailors U21	2025	2026
31	Matthias Josaphat Koesno	(Singapore) (Indonesia)	13 July 2006 (age 20)	(Singapore) BG Tampines Rovers U21	2025	2026
33	Nathan Mao	(Singapore)	26 March 2008 (age 18)	(Singapore) Lion City Sailors U21	2025	2026
34	Harith Danish Irwan	(Singapore)	27 November 2008 (age 17)	(Singapore) Lion City Sailors U21	2025	2026
42	Ryan Vishal	(Singapore)	25 January 2007 (age 19)	(Singapore) Sailors Development Center U17	2024	2026
43	Loo Kai Sheng	(Singapore)	9 January 2007 (age 19)	(Spain) ESC La Liga Academy	2024	2026
44	Adam Reefdy	(Singapore)	8 May 2004 (age 22)	(Singapore) Hougang United U21	2025	2026
45	Nyqil Iyyan	(Singapore)	26 June 2008 (age 18)	Singapore Sports School	2024	2026
50	Sarrvin Raj	(Singapore)	5 April 2008 (age 18)	(Singapore) Lion City Sailors U21	2025	2026
51	Yazid Rizal Rais	(Singapore)	16 March 2006 (age 20)	(Singapore) Lion City Sailors U21	2025	2026
54	Andy Reefqy	(Singapore)	14 July 2008 (age 18)	(Singapore) Lion City Sailors U21	2025	2026
60	Erdy Taha	(Singapore)	18 November 2009 (age 16)	Singapore Sports School	2025	2026
62	Danial Herwan Ukail	(Singapore) (Australia)	2008	(Australia) Melbourne City Academy	2026	2026
70	Christopher Lee Yee Wen	(Singapore)		(Singapore) Hougang United U21	2025	2026
	Kai Whitmore	(Wales)	25 March 2001 (age 25)	(Wales) Newport County	2026	2026
	Darwisy Fitri Johari	(Singapore)	18 February 2009 (age 17)	(Singapore) Lion City Sailors U17	2025	2026
	Adam Faizal	(Singapore)	1 December 2009 (age 16)	(Singapore) Lion City Sailors U17	2025	2026
	Aryan Sahib	(Singapore)	12 September 2009 (age 16)	(Singapore) Lion City Sailors U17	2025	2026
	Izzan Rifqi	(Singapore)	4 March 2010 (age 16)	(Singapore) Lion City Sailors U21	2025	2026
	Aiman Eszuan	(Singapore)	1 December 2009 (age 16)	(Singapore) Lion City Sailors U17	2025	2026
Forwards
9	Sergio Mendonça	(Brazil)	22 January 2004 (age 22)	(Brazil) Maricá (B4)	2025	2026
10	Amir Syafiz	(Singapore)	21 June 2004 (age 22)	Singapore Sports School	2021	2026
13	Louka Tan-Vaissiere	(Singapore) (France)	13 June 2005 (age 21)	(Singapore) Hougang United U21	2025	2026
27	Sahoo Garv	(Singapore)	26 March 2006 (age 20)	(Singapore) Balestier Khalsa U21	2023	2026
28	Syazwan Latiff	(Singapore)	21 February 2006 (age 20)	(Singapore) Geylang International U21	2025	2026
41	Kian Ghadessy	(Singapore) (Iran) (England)	30 November 2005 (age 20)	(Singapore) Lion City Sailors U21	2025	2026
47	Nicolas Michael Beninger	(Singapore) (France)	4 July 2006 (age 20)	(Singapore) BG Tampines Rovers U21	2025	2026
49	Uchenna Eziakor	(Singapore) (Nigeria)	17 May 2008 (age 18)	(Spain) ESC La Liga Academy	2025	2026
58	Adam Irfan	(Singapore) (Indonesia)		(Singapore) Geylang International	2026	2026
59	Tyler Matthew Ho Zheng Yu	(Singapore)	1 November 2007 (age 18)	(Singapore) Lion City Sailors U17	2026	2026
63	Lukyan Tan	(Singapore) (France)	13 May 2009 (age 17)	(Spain) Rayo Ciudad Alcobendas Academy	2025	2026
	Farrel Farhan	(Singapore)	15 March 2009 (age 17)	(Singapore) Lion City Sailors U21	2025	2026
	Danish Abdul Hazin	(Singapore)	6 May 2009 (age 17)	(Singapore) Lion City Sailors U17	2025	2026
Players who left during the season
1	Aizil Yazid	(Singapore)	24 December 2004 (age 21)	(Singapore) Hougang United	2023	2026
2	Raoul Suhaimi	(Singapore)	18 September 2005 (age 20)	Singapore Sports School	2021	2026
3	Lucas Agueiro	(Brazil)	13 July 2004 (age 22)	(Russia) Broke Boys FC	2025	2026
14	Ryu Hardy Yussri	(Singapore)	20 April 2005 (age 21)	Singapore Sports School	2022	2026
16	Aniq Raushan	(Singapore)	5 October 2003 (age 22)	(Singapore) Lion City Sailors U21	2025	2026
18	Benjamin Žerak	(Slovenia)	14 December 2006 (age 19)	(Singapore) Lion City Sailors U21	2025	2026
22	Junki Kenn Yoshimura	(Singapore) (Japan)	20 July 2004 (age 22)	(Japan) Albirex Niigata (S)	2025	2026
23	Danie Hafiy	(Singapore)	6 April 2004 (age 22)	(Singapore) Lion City Sailors U21	2025	2026
24	Izrafil Yusof	(Singapore)	27 January 2004 (age 22)	(Singapore) Tanjong Pagar United	2025	2026
25	Ong Yu En	(Singapore)	3 October 2003 (age 22)	(Singapore) BG Tampines Rovers	2025	2026
39	Ilyasin Zayan	(Singapore) (England)	22 March 2004 (age 22)	(Singapore) Lion City Sailors U21	2025	2026
52	Nazhan Nuraffendi	(Singapore)		(Singapore) Geylang International U17	2025	2026
55	Rae Peh Jun Wen	(Singapore)	15 September 2008 (age 17)	(Singapore) BG Tampines Rovers	2025	2026
Players who left for NS during season
65	Elijah Srinivasa	(Singapore)	9 June 2009 (age 17)	(Singapore)	2026	2026

== Coaching staff ==
Position	Name
Team Manager	(Singapore) Matthew Sean (Singapore) Sakthi Vel Ganesan
Team Manager (SPL2)	(Singapore) Syed Azmi
Head team coach	(Singapore) Firdaus Kassim
Assistant coach	(Singapore) Hafiz Sujad (Singapore) Tengku Mushadad
Head Coach (SPL2 & U19)	(Singapore) Syed Azmi
Goalkeeping coach	(Slovenia) Matija Radikon
Goalkeeping Coach (SPL2 & U19)	(Estonia) Artur Lohmus
Performance Coach	(Germany) Lewin Kösterke
Performance coach (SPL2 & U19)	
Individual Coach	(Portugal) Rodrigo Costa
Individual coach (SPL2 & U19)	(Portugal) Diogo Silva Costa
Condition coach	(Singapore) (Indonesia) Chloe Alphonso
Condition coach (SPL2 & U19)	(Brazil) Vital Ribeiro
Head of Medical	(Netherlands) Wouter de Vroome
Equipment Officer	(Singapore) Omar Mohamed
Match Analyst	(Singapore) Gautam Selvamany
Video Analyst	(Spain) Miguel García

== Transfer ==
=== In ===
Pre-Season

Date (Note: Date of club's announcement, else will be 1 Jun-2025, the date which the free agent start due to lapse of previous contract)	Position	Player	Transferred from	Ref
Permanent Transfer
31 August 2025	GK	(Singapore) Nazhan Nuraffendi	(Singapore)	Free
31 August 2025	GK	(Singapore) Firman Nabil	(Japan) Albirex Niigata (S)	Free (Note: Firman move back to Young Lions after contract with Albirex Niigata (S) ended.)
31 August 2025	DF	(Singapore) Kieran Teo Jia Jun	(Singapore) Geylang International	Free (Note: Kieran rejoins the Young Lions after his contract with Geylang ended.)
31 August 2025	DF	(Singapore) Adam Reefdy	(Singapore) Hougang United U21	Free
31 August 2025	DF	(Brazil) Joilson Lucas	(Brazil) SD Juazeirense	Free (Note: Joilson Lucas move to Young Lions before going back to LCS.)
31 August 2025	MF	(Brazil) Lucas Agueiro	(Russia) Broke Boys FC	Free (Note: Lucas Agueiro move to Young Lions before going back to LCS.)
31 August 2025	FW	(Brazil) Sergio Mendonça	(Brazil) Maricá	Free (Note: Sergio Mendonça move to Young Lions before going back to LCS.)
31 August 2025	FW	(Brazil) Abner Vinicius	(Brazil) Boavista	Free (Note: Abner Vinicius move to Young Lions before going back to LCS.)
Loan Transfer
2 July 2025	MF	(Singapore) Ryu Hardy	(Singapore) Geylang International	Season loan till Dec-25
5 August 2025	DF	(Singapore) Raoul Suhaimi	(Singapore) BG Tampines Rovers	Season loan till Dec-25 (Note: Raoul loaned back to YL till end of SEA Games)
5 August 2025	DF	(Singapore) Andrew Aw	(Singapore) BG Tampines Rovers	Season loan till Dec-25 (Note: Andrew loaned back to YL till end of SEA Games)
5 August 2025	MF	(Singapore) Ong Yu En	(Singapore) BG Tampines Rovers	Season loan till Dec-25
13 August 2025	DF	(Singapore) Ilhan Rizqullah	(Singapore) Lion City Sailors U21	Season loan
13 August 2025	MF	(Singapore) Sarrvin Raj	(Singapore) Lion City Sailors U21	Season loan
14 August 2025	DF	(Singapore) (Japan) Junki Kenn Yoshimura	(Singapore) SAFSA (via. Albirex Niigata)	Season loan
31 August 2025	GK	(Slovenia) Benjamin Žerak	(Singapore) Lion City Sailors U21	Season loan
31 August 2025	GK	(Singapore) (Malaysia) Ashman Saravanan	(Singapore) Lion City Sailors U21	Season loan
31 August 2025	GK	(Singapore) Ainun Nuha Ilyasir	(Singapore) Lion City Sailors U21	Season loan
31 August 2025	GK	(Singapore) Aizil Yazid	(Singapore) Hougang United	Season loan till Dec-25 (Note: Aizil moves back to Young Lions for a year loan)
31 August 2025	DF	(Singapore) Aqil Yazid	(Singapore) Hougang United	Season loan till Dec-25 (Note: Aqil Yazid moves back to Young Lions for a 1/2 year loan)
31 August 2025	DF	(Singapore) Marcus Mosses	(Singapore) Lion City Sailors U21	Season loan till Dec-25
31 August 2025	DF	(Singapore) Aniq Raushan	(Singapore) Lion City Sailors U21	Season loan till Dec-25
31 August 2025	DF	(Singapore) Iliya Naufal	(Singapore) Lion City Sailors U21	Season loan
31 August 2025	DF	(Brazil) Enrico Walmrath Silveira	(Singapore) Lion City Sailors U21	Season loan
31 August 2025	DF	(Singapore) Iryan Fandi	(Singapore) SAFSA (via. Hougang)	Season loan till Dec-25
31 August 2025	DF	(Singapore) Idzham Eszuan	(Singapore) SAFSA (via. LCS U21)	Season loan
31 August 2025	DF	(Singapore) Aqil Khusni	(Singapore) SAFSA (via. LCS U21)	Season loan
31 August 2025	DF	(Singapore) Luth Harith	(Singapore) SAFSA (via. LCS U21)	Season loan
31 August 2025	DF	(Singapore) Nur Muhammad Fadly	(Singapore) SAFSA (via. LCS U21)	Season loan
31 August 2025	MF	(Singapore) Danie Hafiy	(Singapore) Lion City Sailors U21	Season loan till Dec-25
31 August 2025	MF	(Singapore) Andy Reefqy	(Singapore) Lion City Sailors U21	Season loan
31 August 2025	MF	(Singapore) Harith Danish Irwan	(Singapore) SAFSA (via. LCS U21)	Season loan
31 August 2025	MF	(Singapore) Caelan Cheong Tze Jay	(Singapore) SAFSA (via. Tampines U21)	Season loan
31 August 2025	MF	(Singapore) Jovan Ang	(Singapore) SAFSA (via. Tampines U21)	Season loan
31 August 2025	MF	(Singapore) (Indonesia) Matthias Josaphat Koesno	(Singapore) SAFSA (via. Tampines U21)	Season loan till Dec-25
31 August 2025	FW	(Singapore) (France) Louka Tan-Vaissiere	(Singapore) SAFSA (via. Hougang)	Season loan
31 August 2025	FW	(Singapore) Amir Syafiz	(Singapore) Hougang United	Season loan till Dec-25 (Note: Amir Syafiz moves back to Young Lions for a 1/2 year loan)
31 August 2025	FW	(Singapore) Izrafil Yusof	(Singapore) SAFSA (via. LCS U21)	Season loan till Dec-25
31 August 2025	FW	(Singapore) (Nigeria) Uchenna Eziakor	(Singapore) SAFSA (via. LCS U21)	Season loan
31 August 2025	FW	(Singapore) (Iran) (England) Kian Ghadessy	(Singapore) SAFSA (via. LCS U21)	Season loan
31 August 2025	FW	(England) Harry Spence	(Singapore) Lion City Sailors U21	Season loan
31 August 2025	FW	(Singapore) (England) Ilyasin Zayan	(Singapore) SAFSA (via. LCS U21)	Season loan till Dec-25
31 August 2025	FW	(Singapore) (Germany) Fernandez Casey Klein	(Singapore) SAFSA (via. LCS U21)	Season loan
31 August 2025	FW	(Singapore) (France) Nicolas Michael Beninger	(Singapore) SAFSA (via. Tampines U21)	Season loan
31 August 2025	FW	(Singapore) Syazwan Latiff	(Singapore) SAFSA (via. Geylang U21)	Season loan

Mid-season

Date (Note: Date of club's announcement, will be either date of club announcement or 1 Jun-2025, the date which the free agent start due to lapse of previous contract)	Position	Player	Transferred from	Ref
Permanent Transfer
1 December 2025	DF	(Singapore) Zaki Jumlan	(Singapore) National Development Center	Free
1 December 2025	MF	(Singapore) Erdy Taha	Singapore Sports School	Free
1 December 2025	FW	(Singapore) (France) Lukyan Tan	(Spain) Rayo Alcobendas Academy	Free
7 January 2026	DF	(Singapore) Abdil Qaiyyim Mutalib	(Singapore) Balestier Khalsa	Free
11 January 2026	MF	(Singapore) (Australia) Danial Herwan	Free Agent	N.A.
14 April 2026	MF	(Wales) Kai Whitmore	Free Agent	N.A.
Loan Transfer
16 October 2025	MF	(Singapore) Rae Peh	(Singapore) BG Tampines Rovers	Season loan till Dec-25
3 January 2026	DF	(Singapore) (Nigeria) Levi Faris Alfa	(Singapore) Balestier Khalsa	Season loan
7 January 2026	GK	(Singapore) Izwan Mahbud	(Singapore) Lion City Sailors	Season loan
31 January 2026	MF	(Singapore) Ajay Robson	(Singapore) SAFSA (via. Hougang)	Season loan
31 January 2026	MF	(Republic of Ireland) (Japan) Joshua Little	(Singapore) Lion City Sailors	Season loan
31 January 2026	MF	(Singapore) Rauf Anaqi	(Singapore) Albirex Niigata (S)	Season loan
31 January 2026	MF	(Singapore) Christopher Lee	(Singapore) Hougang United	Season loan
31 January 2026	FW	(Singapore) Tyler Matthew	(Singapore) Lion City Sailors	Season loan
31 January 2026	FW	(Singapore) Adam Irfan	(Singapore) Geylang International	Season loan

=== Out ===
Pre-Season

Date (Note: Date of club's announcement, else will be 1 Jun-2025, the date which the free agent start due to lapse of previous contract)	Position	Player	Transferred To	Ref
Permanent Transfer
10 June 2025	DF	(Japan) Jun Kobayashi	(Japan) Kochi United	Free
1 July 2025	MF	(Japan) Kan Kobayashi	(South Korea) Chuncheon Citizen (K3)	Free
1 July 2025	MF	(Singapore) Ryu Hardy	(Singapore) Geylang International	Free
2 July 2025	MF	(Japan) Kaisei Ogawa	(Singapore) Geylang International	Free
4 July 2025	MF	(Singapore) Ethan Henry Pinto	(Singapore) Geylang International	Free
8 July 2025	DF	(Singapore) (Scotland) (Canada) Danial Crichton	(Singapore) Geylang International	Free
11 July 2025	DF	(Singapore) Danish Haqimi	(Singapore) Tanjong Pagar United	Free
18 July 2025	DF	(Singapore) Syafi Hilman	(Singapore) Balestier Khalsa	Free
7 August 2025	MF	(Singapore) Rasul Ramli	(Singapore) BG Tampines Rovers	Free
11 August 2025	MF	(Singapore) Samuel Pillai	(Singapore) Tanjong Pagar United	Free
20 August 2025	DF	(Singapore) Wong Ngang Haang	(Singapore) Balestier Khalsa	Free
31 August 2025	GK	(Singapore) Umayr Sujuandy	(Singapore)	Free
31 August 2025	GK	(Singapore) Rauf Erwan	(Singapore) Hougang United	Free
31 August 2025	DF	(Singapore) Aqil Yazid	(Singapore) Hougang United	Free (Note: Aqil Yazid moves back to Young Lions for a 1/2 year loan)
31 August 2025	FW	(Singapore) Amir Syafiz	(Singapore) Hougang United	Free (Note: Amir Syafiz moves back to Young Lions for a 1/2 year loan)
31 August 2025	DF	(Singapore) Izz Anaqi	(Singapore) Lion City Sailors	Free
31 August 2025	DF	(Singapore) Ikmal Hazlan	(Singapore) Lion City Sailors	Free
31 August 2025	DF	(Singapore) Ariq Rizzuwan	(Singapore) National Development Centre	Free
31 August 2025	DF	(Singapore) Akash Rai	(Singapore)	Free
31 August 2025	DF	(Singapore) Haziq Riduan	(Singapore)	Free
31 August 2025	DF	(Singapore) (Indonesia) Febryan Pradana	(Singapore)	Free
Loan Transfer
31 May 2025	GK	(Singapore) Firman Nabil	(Japan) Albirex Niigata (S)	Loan Return (Note: Firman Nabil rejoins the Young Lions after his contract with Albirex ended.)
31 May 2025	GK	(Singapore) Aizil Yazid	(Singapore) Hougang United	Loan Return (Note: Aizil Yazid moves back to Young Lions for a year loan)
31 May 2025	DF	(Singapore) (Mali) Bill Mamadou	(Singapore) Lion City Sailors	Loan Return (Note: Bill moves to Nakhon Ratchasima after his contract ends at LCS)
31 May 2025	DF	(Singapore) Ryaan Sanizal	(Singapore) SAFSA (via. Tampines)	Loan Return (Note: Ryaan Sanizal moves to Hougang after his contract with Tampines lapsed.)
31 May 2025	DF	(Singapore) Andrew Aw	(Singapore) SAFSA (via. Tampines)	Loan Return
31 May 2025	DF	(Singapore) Iryan Fandi	(Singapore) SAFSA (via. Hougang)	Loan Return
31 May 2025	DF	(Singapore) Kieran Teo Jia Jun	(Singapore) SAFSA (via. Geylang)	Loan Return
31 May 2025	DF	(Singapore) Nur Adam Abdullah	(Singapore) SAFSA (via LCS)	Loan Return
31 May 2025	MF	(Singapore) Danish Qayyum	(Singapore) SAFSA (via LCS)	Loan Return (Note: Danish moves to Albirex Niigata (S) after his contract ends at LCS)
31 May 2025	FW	(Singapore) Lim Zheng Wu	(Singapore) SAFSA (via. Tampines)	Loan Return

Mid-Season

Date (Note: Date of club's announcement, else will be 1 Jun-2025, the date which the free agent start due to lapse of previous contract)	Position	Player	Transferred To	Ref
Permanent Transfer
17 October 2025	MF	(Singapore) Ryu Hardy	(Singapore) Geylang International	End of loan (Note: Ryu Hardy loan curtailed early.)
16 November 2025	MF	(Singapore) (Indonesia) Matthias Josaphat Koesno	(Singapore) SAFSA (via. Tampines U21)	End of loan
1 January 2026	DF	(Singapore) Raoul Suhaimi	(Singapore) BG Tampines Rovers	End of loan
1 January 2026	MF	(Singapore) Rae Peh	(Singapore) BG Tampines Rovers	End of loan
1 January 2026	MF	(Singapore) Ong Yu En	(Singapore) BG Tampines Rovers	End of loan
1 January 2026	MF	(Singapore) Danie Hafiy	(Singapore) Lion City Sailors U21	End of loan
8 January 2026	GK	(Slovenia) Benjamin Žerak	(Singapore) Lion City Sailors	End of loan
8 January 2026	MF	(Brazil) Lucas Agueiro	(Singapore) Lion City Sailors	Free
10 January 2026	FW	(Singapore) Izrafil Yusof	(Singapore) Lion City Sailors	End of loan
January 2026	DF	(Singapore) Aniq Raushan	(Singapore) Lion City Sailors	End of loan
January 2026	DF	(Singapore) (Japan) Junki Kenn Yoshimura	(Singapore) SAFSA (via. Albirex Niigata)	End of loan
January 2026	FW	(Singapore) (England) Ilyasin Zayan	(Singapore) SAFSA (via. LCS U21)	End of loan
January 2026	GK	(Singapore) Nazhan Nuraffendi	(Singapore)	Free
14 March 2026	GK	(Singapore) Aizil Yazid	(Singapore) Hougang United	End of loan
Loan Transfer

=== Retained ===
Position	Player	Ref
DF	(Singapore) Raoul Suhaimi	
MF	(Singapore) Fairuz Fazli Koh	
MF	(Singapore) Ethan Henry Pinto	

== Friendly ==
=== Pre-season friendly ===
Win Draw Loss

July 2025 1	Lion City Sailors (Singapore)	1–0	(Singapore) Young Lions

19 July 2025 2	Young Lions (Singapore)	0–1	(Singapore) BG Tampines Rovers	Kallang
				Stadium: Kallang Football Hub

Thailand Tour

20 July 2025 1	Kasetsart (Thailand)	–	(Singapore) Young Lions U21	Kasetsart
				Stadium: Insee Chantarasatit Stadium

20 July 2025 2	Kasetsart (Thailand)	2–0	(Singapore) Young Lions	Kasetsart
				Stadium: Insee Chantarasatit Stadium

Portugal Tour

23 August 2025	A.D. Ovarense (Portugal)	3–1	(Singapore) Young Lions	Aveiro District, Portugal
			Sergio Mendonça	Stadium: Estádio Marques da Silva

== Team statistics ==
=== Appearances and goals ===
As of 16 May 26

Numbers in parentheses denote appearances as substitute.

No.	Pos.	Player	Sleague		Singapore Cup		Total	
No.	Pos.	Player	Apps.	Goals	Apps.	Goals	Apps.	Goals
3	MF	(Republic of Ireland) (Japan) Joshua Little	1+3	0	0	0	4	0
4	DF	(Brazil) Joilson Lucas	9	0	0	0	9	0
5	DF	(Brazil) Enrico Walmrath Silveirah	4+7	0	0	0	11	0
6	MF	(Singapore) Ajay Robson	7+2	0	0	0	9	0
7	FW	(Brazil) Abner Vinicius	12+6	2	0	0	18	2
8	DF	(Singapore) Andrew Aw	14+4	0	0	0	18	0
9	FW	(Brazil) Sergio Mendonça	16+3	8	0	0	19	8
10	FW	(Singapore) Amir Syafiz	14+7	0	0	0	21	0
11	FW	(England) Harry Spence	20+1	0	0	0	21	0
12	GK	(Singapore) Ainun Nuha Ilyasir	0	0	0	0	0	0
13	FW	(Singapore) (France) Louka Tan-Vaissiere	1+3	1	0	0	4	1
15	DF	(Singapore) Marcus Mosses	6+1	0	0	0	7	0
17	DF	(Singapore) Iryan Fandi	4+2	0	0	0	6	0
19	DF	(Singapore) Aqil Yazid	5	0	0	0	5	0
20	MF	(Singapore) Fairuz Fazli Koh	13+3	0	0	0	16	0
21	DF	(Singapore) Kieran Teo Jia Jun	9+1	0	0	0	10	0
26	DF	(Singapore) Iliya Naufal	0	0	0	0	0	0
27	FW	(Singapore) Sahoo Garv	2+5	0	0	0	7	0
28	FW	(Singapore) Syazwan Latiff	0	0	0	0	0	0
29	MF	(Singapore) Caelan Cheong Tze Jay	0+8	0	0	0	8	0
30	FW	(Singapore) (Germany) Fernandez Casey Klein	0	0	0	0	0	0
31	GK	(Singapore) Izwan Mahbud	16	0	0	0	16	0
32	GK	(Singapore) (Malaysia) Ashman Saravanan	0+1	0	0	0	1	0
33	FW	(Singapore) Nathan Mao	15	0	0	0	15	0
34	MF	(Singapore) Harith Danish Irwan	5+6	0	0	0	11	0
35	GK	(Singapore) Firman Nabil	0	0	0	0	0	0
36	DF	(Singapore) Idzham Eszuan	0	0	0	0	0	0
37	DF	(Singapore) Ikram Mikhail Mustaqim	0	0	0	0	0	0
38	DF	(Singapore) Ilhan Rizqullah	0	0	0	0	0	0
40	MF	(Singapore) Jovan Ang	0	0	0	0	0	0
41	FW	(Singapore) (England) (Iran) Kian Ghadessy	0+1	0	0	0	1	0
42	MF	(Singapore) Ryan Vishal	0	0	0	0	0	0
43	MF	(Singapore) Loo Kai Sheng	0	0	0	0	0	0
44	DF	(Singapore) Adam Reefdy	0	0	0	0	0	0
45	MF	(Singapore) Nyqil Iyyan	0	0	0	0	0	0
46	DF	(Singapore) Luth Harith	10+1	0	0	0	11	0
47	FW	(Singapore) (France) Nicolas Michael Beninger	3+8	0	0	0	11	0
48	DF	(Singapore) Nur Muhammad Fadly	1	0	0	0	1	0
49	FW	(Singapore) (Nigeria) Uchenna Eziakor	0	0	0	0	0	0
50	FW	(Singapore) Sarrvin Raj	0+1	0	0	0	1	0
51	MF	(Singapore) Yazid Rizal Rais	0	0	0	0	0	0
52	GK	(Singapore) Nazhan Nuraffendi	0	0	0	0	0	0
53	DF	(Singapore) Aqil Khusni	0	0	0	0	0	0
54	DF	(Singapore) Andy Reefqy	13+4	0	0	0	17	0
62	MF	(Singapore) (Australia) Danial Herwan	7+5	0	0	0	12	0
66	DF	(Singapore) Abdil Qaiyyim Mutalib	6+2	0	0	0	8	0
67	DF	(Singapore) (Nigeria) Levi Faris Alfa	0	0	0	0	0	0
Players who have played this season and/or sign for the season but had left the club or on loan to other club
1	GK	(Singapore) Aizil Yazid	2+1	0	0	0	3	0
2	DF	(Singapore) Raoul Suhaimi	5	0	0	0	5	0
3	MF	(Brazil) Lucas Agueiro	3+2	1	0	0	5	1
14	MF	(Singapore) Ryu Hardy Yussri	0+1	0	0	0	1	0
16	DF	(Singapore) Aniq Raushan	0	0	0	0	0	0
18	GK	(Slovenia) Benjamin Žerak	4	0	0	0	4	0
22	DF	(Singapore) (Japan) Junki Kenn Yoshimura	0	0	0	0	0	0
23	DF	(Singapore) Danie Hafiy	0+1	0	0	0	1	0
24	FW	(Singapore) Izrafil Yusof	0+1	0	0	0	1	0
25	MF	(Singapore) Ong Yu En	5	0	0	0	5	0
31	MF	(Singapore) (Indonesia) Matthias Josaphat Koesno	0	0	0	0	0	0
39	FW	(Singapore) (England) Ilyasin Zayan	0	0	0	0	0	0
55	MF	(Singapore) Rae Peh	1+1	0	0	0	2	0

== Competitions ==
=== Overview ===
Results summary

Overall								Home						Away					
Pld	W	D	L	GF	GA	GD	Pts	W	D	L	GF	GA	GD	W	D	L	GF	GA	GD
0	0	0	0	0	0	0	0	0	0	0	0	0	0	0	0	0	0	0	0

=== Singapore Premier League ===
Win Draw Loss

25 September 2025 1 (Rescheduled)	Tanjong Pagar United (Singapore)	5–1	(Singapore) Young Lions	Jurong East
	Youssef Ezzejjari 35', 62', 64', 76'; Bruno Dybal 86'; Fathullah Rahmat (yellow card) 25'; Guilherme Rodrigues (yellow card) 45+6'; Syahrul Sazali (yellow card) 81'		Abner Vinicius 15'; Iryan Fandi (yellow card) 43'	Stadium: Jurong East Stadium; Referee: Syarqawi Buhari; Man of the Match: (Spain) Youssef Ezzejjari

2 October 2025 2 (Rescheduled)	Young Lions (Singapore)	0–2	(Singapore) Hougang United	Tampines
			Yotsakorn Burapha 50' (yellow card) 84'; Víctor Blasco 76'; Jordan Vestering (yellow card) 44'; Ryohei Yoshihama (yellow card) 90+3'	Stadium: Our Tampines Hub (Note: Location changed due to re-turfing of Jalan Besar Stadium); Referee: Farhan Mohd; Man of the Match: (Singapore) Farhan Zulkifli

21 September 2025 3	Young Lions (Singapore)	1–2	(Singapore) Balestier Khalsa	Tampines
	Sergio Mendonça 7' (pen.); Andrew Aw (yellow card) 64'		Masahiro Sugita 14'; Elijah Lim 90+10'; Madhu Mohana (yellow card) 70'; Jakov Katuša (yellow card) 74'	Stadium: Our Tampines Hub (Note: Location changed due to re-turfing of Jalan Besar Stadium); Referee: Taufik Thana; Man of the Match: (Croatia) Mario Mustapić

18 October 2026 4	Lion City Sailors (Singapore)	5–1	(Singapore) Young Lions	Bishan
	Maxime Lestienne 18'; Bailey Wright 34'; Lennart Thy 49'; Bart Ramselaar 79'; Shawal Anuar 81'; Nur Adam (yellow card) 38'	Report	Lucas Agueiro 30'; Andrew Aw (yellow card) 72'	Stadium: Bishan Stadium; Referee: Taufik Thana; Man of the Match: (Germany) Lennart Thy

25 October 2025 5	Young Lions (Singapore)	1–3	(Singapore) Geylang International	Tampines
	Sergio Mendonça 17' (yellow card) 53'		Shuhei Hoshino 20'; Vincent Bezecourt 58'; Riku Fukashiro 61'; Ryoya Taniguchi (penalty missed) 38; Shahdan Sulaiman (yellow card) 53'	Stadium: Our Tampines Hub (Note: Location changed due to re-turfing of Jalan Besar Stadium); Referee: Zulfiqar Mustaffa; Man of the Match: (France) Vincent Bezecourt

4 May 2026 6 (Rescheduled)	Albirex Niigata (S) (Japan)	1–0	(Singapore) Young Lions	Jurong East
	Shingo Nakano 90+6' (pen.); Jaden Heng (yellow card) 13'; Komei Iida (yellow card) 63'; Cho Eun-su (yellow card) 68'	Report	Abner Vinicius (yellow card) 86'	Stadium: Jurong East Stadium; Referee: Thawfeek Ahamad; Man of the Match: (Brazil) Abner Vinicius

16 January 2026 7	BG Tampines Rovers (Singapore)	7–1	(Singapore) Young Lions	Tampines
	Hide Higashikawa 8', 38', 72', 76'; Koya Kazama 29', 30'; Glenn Kweh 45+1'; Seiga Sumi (yellow card) 45+5'; Shah Shahiran (yellow card) 49'; Jacob Mahler (yellow card) 74'	Report	Abner Vinicius 10'; Izwan Mahbud (red card) 21'; Harith Danish Irwan (yellow card) 68'	Stadium: Our Tampines Hub; Referee: Clarence Leow; Man of the Match: (Japan) Hide Higashikawa

26 January 2026 8	Young Lions (Singapore)	1–1	(Singapore) Tanjong Pagar United	Jalan Besar
	Sergio Mendonça 26'; Andrew Aw (yellow card) 23'; Luth Harith (yellow card) 49'; Kieran Teo (yellow card) 87'; Enrico Walmrath (yellow card) 90+5'		Zenivio 45+8'; Raihan Rahman (yellow card) 36'; Fathullah Rahmat (yellow card) 54'; Aaron Evans (yellow card) 90+1'	Stadium: Jalan Besar Stadium; Referee: Taufik Thana; Man of the Match: (Brazil) Abner Vinicius

30 January 2026 9	Hougang United (Singapore)	0–3; Awarded (Note: Hougang United v Young Lions, Originally won 2–0 by Hougang United, the match was forfeited and awarded 3–0 to Young Lions, after Hougang fielded an ineligible player.)	(Singapore) Young Lions	Bishan
	Settawut Wongsai 30'; Victor Blasco 73' (pen.) (yellow card) 64'; Saifullah Akbar (yellow card) 20'; Huzaifah Aziz (yellow card) 39'; Yuma Suwa (yellow card) 50'	Report	Joilson Lucas (yellow card) 60'	Stadium: Bishan Stadium (Note: Location changed due to swapping of stadium with LCS upon completion of returfing of Jalan Besar Stadium); Referee: Ahmad A'Qashah; Man of the Match: (Singapore) Ryaan Sanizal

8 February 2026 10	Young Lions (Singapore)	0–2	(Singapore) Lion City Sailors	Jalan Besar
	Sergio Mendonça (yellow card) 71'	Report	Bailey Wright 14'; Lennart Thy 35'; Akram Azman (yellow card) 75'	Stadium: Jalan Besar Stadium; Referee: Syarqawi Buhari; Man of the Match: (Australia) Bailey Wright

13 February 2026 11	Balestier Khalsa (Singapore)	3–1	(Singapore) Young Lions	Bishan
	Bogdan Mandić 36' (pen.); Jakov Katuša 64', 73'; Tin Matic (yellow card) 19'; Lazar Vujanic (yellow card) 20'; Elijah Lim (yellow card) 86'	Report	Sergio Mendonça 70' (yellow card) 20' (penalty missed) 27	Stadium: Bishan Stadium; Referee: Muhd Taqi; Man of the Match: (Croatia) Jakov Katuša

21 February 2026 12	Young Lions (Singapore)	0–2	(Japan) Albirex Niigata (S)	Jalan Besar
	Joilson Lucas (yellow card) 58'; Andy Reefqy (yellow card) 74'	Report	Shingo Nakano 23', 63'; Naoki Yoshioka (yellow card) 72'; Syed Firdaus (yellow card) 80'	Stadium: Jalan Besar Stadium; Referee: Hilmi Fuad; Man of the Match: (Japan) Shingo Nakano

26 February 2026 13	Geylang International (Singapore)	1–1	(Singapore) Young Lions	Tampines
	Ryoya Taniguchi 18'; Joshua Pereira (yellow card) 61'; Iqram Rifqi (yellow card) 90+12'		Sergio Mendonça 44' (yellow card) 90+11'; Kieran Teo Jia Jun (yellow card) 17'; Fairuz Fazli Koh (yellow card) 26'; Harry Spence (yellow card) 87'; Harith Danish Irwan (red card) 90+4'	Stadium: Our Tampines Hub; Referee: Zulfiqar Mustaffa; Man of the Match: (Singapore) Izwan Mahbud

8 March 2026 14 (Rescheduled)	Young Lions (Singapore)	0–5	(Singapore) BG Tampines Rovers	Jalan Besar
		Report	Shuya Yamashita 14'; Hide Higashikawa 39'; Glenn Kweh 45+7' (pen.); Koya Kazama 59'; Zikos Vasileios Chua 68'	Stadium: Jalan Besar Stadium; Referee: Hilmi Fuad

14 March 2026 15	Young Lions (Singapore)	0–2	(Singapore) Hougang United	Jalan Besar
	Luth Harith (yellow card) 13'; Danial Herwan (yellow card) 79'; Abner Vinicius (yellow card) 90+3'		Nabilai Kibunguchy 55'; Jaushua Sotirio 57'	Stadium: Jalan Besar Stadium; Referee: Oswind Suriya

5 April 2026 16	Young Lions (Singapore)	0–2	(Singapore) Balestier Khalsa	Jalan Besar
	Andrew Aw (yellow card) 45+1'; Ajay Robson (yellow card) 80'		Masahiro Sugita 54'; Daniel Goh 87'; Bogdan Mandić (penalty missed) 28; Darren Teh (yellow card) 64'	Stadium: Jalan Besar Stadium; Referee: Syarqawi Buhari; Man of the Match: (Japan) Masahiro Sugita

10 April 2026 17	Tanjong Pagar United (Singapore)	0–1	(Singapore) Young Lions	Jurong East
	Zenivio (yellow card) 60'; Syed Akmal (yellow card) 64'; Emilio Estevez (yellow card) 90+5'		Sergio Mendonça 5'; Abner Vinicius (yellow card) 52'; Ajay Robson (yellow card) 68'	Stadium: Jurong East Stadium; Referee: Hilmi Fuad; Man of the Match: (Singapore) Izwan Mahbud

20 April 2026 18	Lion City Sailors (Singapore)	2–0	(Singapore) Young Lions	Jalan Besar
	Lennart Thy 73'; Anderson Lopes 90+8'; Shawal Anuar (yellow card) 78'; Song Ui-young (yellow card) 86'		Ajay Robson (yellow card) 21' (yellow-red card) 61'; Abner Vinicius (yellow card) 90+5'; Sergio Mendonça (yellow card) 90+9'	Stadium: Jalan Besar Stadium; Referee: Jansen Foo; Man of the Match: (Germany) Lennart Thy

24 April 2026 19	BG Tampines Rovers (Singapore)	8–1	(Singapore) Young Lions	Tampines
	Trent Buhagiar 4' (yellow card) 43'; Irfan Najeeb 23'; Shah Shahiran 28', 78'; Koya Kazama 33'; Glenn Kweh 80'; Ong Yu En 88'; Hide Higashikawa 90+6'	Report	Sergio Mendonça 31'	Stadium: Our Tampines Hub; Referee: Farhan Mohd; Man of the Match: (Singapore) Shah Shahiran

16 May 2026 20 (Rescheduled)	Albirex Niigata (S) (Japan)	3–0	(Singapore) Young Lions	Jurong East
	Zulqarnaen Suzliman 5'; Ryang Hyon-ju 30'; Shingo Nakano 66'; Haziq Kamarudin (yellow card) 33'; Nicky Melvin Singh (yellow card) 90+2'; Komei Iida (yellow card) 90+3'		Iryan Fandi (yellow card) 11'; Marcus Mosses (yellow card) 28'; Abner Vinicius (yellow card) 45+1'	Stadium: Jurong East Stadium; Referee: Ahmad A'Qashah

9 May 2026 21 (Rescheduled)	Young Lions (Singapore)	2–2	(Singapore) Geylang International	Jalan Besar
	Sergio Mendonça 39' (yellow card) 52'; Louka Tan-Vaissiere 90+8'; Andrew Aw (yellow card) 90+1'; Nicolas Michael Beninger (yellow card) 90+10'		Kim Tae-ho 33', 90+6'	Stadium: Jalan Besar Stadium; Referee: Oswind Suriya; Man of the Match: (Singapore) Amir Syafiz

Pos	Team	Pld	W	D	L	GF	GA	GD	Pts	Qualification or relegation
1	Lion City Sailors (C)	21	16	3	2	70	14	+56	51	Qualification for Champions League Two group stage (Note: Since the winners of the 2025–26 Singapore Cup, Lion City Sailors, qualified for the Champions League Two by league position, the spot reserved for the Singapore Cup winners will pass to the runners-up of the league.)
2	BG Tampines Rovers	21	15	4	2	58	21	+37	49	Qualification for Champions League Two group stage
3	Albirex Niigata (S)	21	15	2	4	47	19	+28	47	
4	Balestier Khalsa	21	11	2	8	44	46	−2	35	
5	Geylang International	21	7	3	11	29	42	−13	24	
6	Hougang United	21	7	0	14	24	41	−17	21	
7	Young Lions (Note: Young Lions cannot qualify for AFC competitions.)	21	2	3	16	15	58	−43	9	
8	Tanjong Pagar United	21	2	1	18	17	63	−46	7	

Updated to match(es) played on 18 May 2026. Source: Singapore Premier League
Rules for classification: 1) points; 2) goal difference; 3) number of goals scored; 4) number of wins
(C) Champions

== Competition (SPL2) ==
Win Draw Loss

9 December 2025 1 (Rescheduled)	Balestier Khalsa (Singapore)	0–4	(Singapore) Young Lions	Bishan
	Daniyal Lynn Rasor (red card) 45'; Karthigaya Varmaan (yellow card) 54'		Aqil M. Khusni 36'; Ilyasin Zayan 45'; Garv Sahoo 48', 90'; Iliya Naufal Idris (yellow card) 45'; Zaki Jumlan (yellow card) 65'; Lukyan Tan (yellow card) 83'; Marcus Mosses (yellow card) 85'	Stadium: Bishan Stadium; Referee: Yazid Abdul Latiff

24 September 2025 2 (Rescheduled)	Albirex Niigata (S) (Japan)	4–0	(Singapore) Young Lions	Jurong East
	Helmi Shahrol 45'; Jaden Heng 47'; Syukri Bashir 59'; Soshi Kadowaki 70'; Sim Jun Yen (yellow card) 18'		Ikram Mikhail Mustaqim (yellow card) 43'; Yazid Rais (yellow card) 74'	Stadium: Jurong East Stadium; Referee: Aldrick Lee

30 September 2025 3	Hougang United (Singapore)	0–2	(Singapore) Young Lions	Choa Chu Kang
	Rauf Sanizal (yellow card) 28'; Khilfi Aniq (yellow card) 50'; Yuta Kikuchi (yellow card) 55'; Chun Wei Woo (yellow card) 90+4'		Iliya Naufal Idris 59' (yellow card) 32'; Ilyasin Zayan 85'	Stadium: Choa Chu Kang Stadium; Referee: Yazid Abdul Latiff

4 November 2025 4 (Rescheduled)	Young Lions (Singapore)	3–1	(Singapore) Tanjong Pagar United	Jurong East
	Naufal Ilham 11'; Joilson (yellow card) 66'; Enrico Walmrath (yellow card) 78'		Sérgio Mendonça 21', 59'; Nicolas Benninger 68'; Sahil Suhaimi (yellow card) 52'; Danish Haqimi (yellow card) 87'	Stadium: Jurong East Stadium; Referee: Aldrick Lee

15 October 2025 5	Lion City Sailors (Singapore)	1–0	(Singapore) Young Lions	Bishan
	Abdul Rasaq 28'; Naufal Azman (yellow card) 72'; Aiman Zayani (yellow card) 76'; Nur Adam Abdullah (yellow card) 82'; Zulqarnaen Suzliman (yellow card) 88'		Marcus Mosses (yellow card) 90'	Stadium: Bishan Stadium; Referee: Mazlan Pagira

28 October 2025 6	Young Lions (Singapore)	6–3	(Singapore) Geylang International	Tampines
	Danie Hafiy 5'; Garv Sahoo 18'; Nicolas Benninger 45'; Caelan Cheong 51'; Iliya Naufal Idris 59'; Iqram Rifqi 83' (o.g.); Ryan Vishal (yellow card) 23'; Ikram Mikhail Mustaqim (yellow card) 33'; Luth Harith Fathi (yellow card) 63'; Yazid Rais (yellow card) 78'; Muhammad Fadly (yellow card) 85'		Gareth Low 66' (pen.), 76' (yellow card) 81'; Tajeli Salamat 70'; Ryu Hardy (yellow card) 48'; Raiyan Noor (yellow card) 80'	Stadium: Our Tampines Hub; Referee: Noor Adzdzeeq

10 November 2025 7	Young Lions (Singapore)	4–2	(Singapore) BG Tampines Rovers	Bishan
	Nicolas Benninger 68'; Shafrel Ariel 75' (o.g.); Abner Vinicius 78' (yellow card) 58'; Sérgio Mendonça 80'; Ikram Mikhail Mustaqim (yellow card) 83'		Tallo Ngao 42', 47'; Sky Yeo (yellow card) 60'; Shafrel Ariel (yellow card) 63'; Nalawich Inthacharoen (yellow card) 66'; Kegan Phang (yellow card) 70'	Stadium: Bishan Stadium; Referee: Khairul Amri

17 November 2025 8	Young Lions (Singapore)	3–0	(Singapore) Balestier Khalsa	Bishan
	Jovan Ang 18' (yellow card) 47'; Nicolas Benninger 79' (yellow card) 82'; Yazid Rais 90'; Idzham Eszuan (yellow card) 90'		Karthigaya Varmaan (yellow card) 57'; Adly Irfan (yellow card) 74'	Stadium: Bishan Stadium; Referee: Taufik Thana

4 December 2025 9 (Rescheduled)	BG Tampines Rovers (Singapore)	2–3	(Singapore) Young Lions	Tampines
	Tallo Ngao 26', 37'; Kegan Phang (yellow card) 45'; Witthawat Phraothaisong (yellow card) 52'; Ilham Iskandar (yellow card) 65'; Shaddiq Mansor (yellow card) 90'			Stadium: Our Tampines Hub; Referee: Thawfeek Ahamad

13 November 2025 10 (Rescheduled)	Young Lions (Singapore)	1–2	(Singapore) Hougang United	Tampines
	Iliya Naufal Idris 11'; Casey Klein (yellow card) 34'; Ikram Mikhail Mustaqim (yellow card) 55'; Idzham Eszuan (yellow card) 81'; Ryan Vishal (yellow card) 89'		Farhan Sahlan 9'; Khilfi Aniq 41' (yellow card) 57'; Brant Tan (yellow card) 42'	Stadium: Our Tampines Hub; Referee: Jansen Foo

10 February 2026 11 (Rescheduled)	Tanjong Pagar United (Singapore)	1–5	(Singapore) Young Lions	Jurong East
	Darius Lai 30'; Haziq Zulkifli (yellow card) 67'; Fathullah Rahmat (yellow card) 82'		Caelan Cheong 21'; Harith Danish Irwan 56', 69'; Nicolas Beninger 61'; Zaki Jumlan 88'	Stadium: Jurong East Stadium; Referee: Faris Abdul Rahman

13 January 2026 12 (Rescheduled)	Young Lions (Singapore)	0–2	(Singapore) Lion City Sailors	Jalan Besar
	Marcus Mosses (red card) 45'		Ahmad Danial 82'; Ikmal Hazlan 90'	Stadium: Jalan Besar Stadium; Referee: Syarqawi Buhari

20 January 2026 13	Geylang International (Singapore)	1–0	(Singapore) Young Lions	Tampines
	Iqram Rifqi 73'; Aniq Martin (yellow card) 42'; Danial Scott Crichton (yellow card) 90'		Levi Farris (yellow card) 71'	Stadium: Our Tampines Hub; Referee: Thawfeek Ahamad

27 January 2026 14	Young Lions (Singapore)	4–1	(Japan) Albirex Niigata (S)	Jalan Besar
	Rauf Anaqi 24'; Nicolas Beninger 51'; Ajay Robson 60'; Lukyan Tan Ye Yi 80'; Loo Kai Sheng (yellow card) 56'		Ahmad Martin 67'; Khaalish Aaqil (yellow card) 33' (yellow-red card); Jaden Heng (yellow card) 62'; Danish Qayyum (yellow card) 76'	Stadium: Jalan Besar Stadium; Referee: Faris Abdul Rahman

3 February 2026 15	Balestier Khalsa (Singapore)	0–2	(Singapore) Young Lions	Jalan Besar
	Saf Loqmen (yellow card) 33'; Irfan Iskandar (yellow card) 45' (yellow-red card) 82'; Aqil Dany (yellow card) 86'; Karthigaya Varmaan (yellow card) 90'		Kian Ghadessy 79' (pen.), 90'; Ryan Vishal (yellow card) 65' (yellow-red card) 72'; Ajay Robson (yellow card) 67' (yellow-red card) 69'	Stadium: Jalan Besar Stadium; Referee: Khairul Amri

24 February 2026 16	Young Lions (Singapore)	1–2	(Singapore) BG Tampines Rovers	Jalan Besar
	Garv Sahoo 65'; Caelan Cheong (yellow card) 48'; Ryan Vishal (yellow card) 58'; Ayden Syaifuallah (yellow card) 90'		Anton Goh 63'; Caden Lim 76'; Shafrel Ariel (yellow card) 26'; Liam Buckley (yellow card) 44'; Ong Yu En (yellow card) 45+2'; Zeeshan Iskandar (yellow card) 88'; Rae Peh (yellow card) 90+3'	Stadium: Jalan Besar Stadium; Referee: Noor Adzdzeeq

17 March 2026 17	Hougang United (Singapore)	2–3	(Singapore) Young Lions	Jalan Besar
	Woo Chun Wei 83'; Ryaan Sanizal 89'; Aizil Yazid (yellow card) 19'		Garv Sahoo 11', 47'; Abner Vinicius 38' (pen.)	Stadium: Jalan Besar Stadium; Referee: Taufik Thana

31 March 2026 18	Young Lions (Singapore)	2–2	(Singapore) Tanjong Pagar United	Jurong East
	Uchenna Eziakor 29'; Kai Sheng Loo 54'; Ajay Robson (yellow card) 60'		Junior Djile 75'; Anaqi Ismit 86'; Fathullah Rahmat (yellow card) 15'; Aiqel Aliman (yellow card) 78'; Faizal Roslan (yellow card) 82'	Stadium: Jurong East Stadium; Referee: Yazid Abdul Latiff

7 April 2026 19	Lion City Sailors (Singapore)	2–5	(Singapore) Young Lions	Bishan
	Sérgio Mendonça 11', 63', 70'; Adam Irfan 86', 90+5'; Adam Faisal (yellow card) 14'		Ahmad Danial 20'; Yasir Nizamudin 89'; Iryan Fandi (yellow card) 58'; Harith Danish Irwan (yellow card) 78'	Stadium: Bishan Stadium; Referee: Aldrick Lee

14 April 2026 20	Young Lions (Singapore)	3–1	(Singapore) Geylang International	Jalan Besar
	Amir Syafiz 27'; Sérgio Mendonça 57'; Harry Spence 67' (yellow card) 62'		Pathyn Banesh 89'; Irfan Riqifi (yellow card) 72' (yellow-red card) 78'	Stadium: Jalan Besar Stadium; Referee: Taufik Thana

21 April 2026 21	Albirex Niigata (S) (Japan)	2–1	(Singapore) Young Lions	Jalan Besar
	Ren Nishimura 1' (yellow card) 50'; Helmi Shahrol 75'; Aqil Zafri (yellow card) 83'; Shakthi Vinayagavijayan (yellow card) 86'; Danish Qayyum (yellow card) 89'		Abner Vinicius 44' (pen.); Fairuz Fazli (yellow card) 17'; Muhammad Fadly (yellow card) 32'	Stadium: Jalan Besar Stadium; Referee: Mazlan Pagira

Pos	Team	Pld	W	D	L	GF	GA	GD	Pts	Qualification or relegation
1	Albirex Niigata (S) II	21	14	1	6	50	23	+27	43	Inaugural Champion
2	Young Lions B	21	13	1	7	52	31	+21	40	
3	BG Tampines Rovers II	21	12	2	7	46	30	+16	38	
4	Geylang International II	21	9	4	8	36	38	−2	31	
5	Tanjong Pagar United II	21	9	3	9	34	43	−9	30	
6	Lion City Sailors II	21	7	2	12	35	41	−6	23	
7	Hougang United II	21	5	4	12	28	43	−15	19	
8	Balestier Khalsa II	21	5	3	13	25	57	−32	18	

First match(es) will be played: 7 May 2026. Source: Singapore Premier League
Rules for classification: 1) points; 2) goal difference; 3) number of goals scored; 4) number of wins
