= Kazeem Babatunde =

Nigerian footballer

Personal information
- Full name: Kazeem Abiodun Are Babatunde
- Date of birth: 1 January 1984
- Place of birth: Nigeria
- Position: Forward

Senior career*
Years	Team	Apps	(Gls)
- Julius Berger F.C.
2003–2004	Young Lions FC		
20??–2013	Prime F.C.		

International career
1999–2001	Nigeria U17		
- * Club domestic league appearances and goals

Kazeem Babatunde (born 1 January 1984 in Nigeria) is a Nigerian former professional footballer who is last known to have been contracted to Prime F.C. in his home country.

== Singapore ==
Switching to Young Lions alongside two other Nigerians, Itimi Dickson and Precious Emuejeraye, for the 2004 Singapore S.League, Babatunde failed to make a discernible impact during his days there and was released mid-season.
