= Benjamin Bertrand =

French footballer (born 1992)

Personal information
- Date of birth: 24 June 1992 (age 34)
- Place of birth: Bourges, France
- Height: 1.83 m (6 ft 0 in)
- Position: Goalkeeper

Youth career
- –2003: Aviron Bayonnais
- 2003–2006: Real Sociedad
- 2006–2009: Bordeaux
- 2009–2011: Tours

Senior career*
Years	Team	Apps	(Gls)
2009–2014	Tours II	29	(0)
2011–2015	Tours	9	(0)
2016	Young Lions	12	(0)
2018	Francs Borains	10	(0)
2019–2022	Pau FC	3	(0)
2020–2022	Pau FC II	1	(0)

Managerial career
- 2022-2023: Pau FC II
- 2023-: FC Sion (assistant)
- * Club domestic league appearances and goals

Benjamin Bertrand (born 24 June 1992) is a French retired professional footballer who played as a goalkeeper.

== Career ==
=== Tours ===
Bertrand went through various academies, including those of Real Sociedad, Girondins Bordeaux, and Tours FC. From the latter, he eventually managed to break into professional football, making his Ligue 2 debut on 1 August 2014 against US Créteil-Lusitanos in a 4–2 home win. Bertrand was occasionally also used in the second team providing him with game time. After the 2014–15 season, his contract did not get extended.

=== Young Lions ===
After being a free agent for the first half of the 2015–16 season, he signed a six-month contract with Singaporean side Young Lions, for the 2016 S.League season, making him the highest paid player on the team. He made his debut in the fourth game of the season, helping his new side to a more respectable score-line against nine times champions Warriors FC. After the 2016 S.League season ended, Bertrand decided to not extend his contract, deciding for a return to Europe.

=== Return to Europe ===
Since his return to Europe, Bertrand has remained a free agent, attracting a variety of teams. He has been on trial with French Ligue 2 team Sochaux-Montbéliard.

=== Francs Borains ===
After several trials with various clubs, Bertrand signed with Belgian Third Amateur Division club Francs Borains on 29 January 2018 until the end of the season.

=== Pau FC ===
On 15 July 2019, and after being a free agent for one year, Bertrand signed a contract with Championnat National club Pau FC. On 16 November 2019, he made his debut for the club, in a 1–0 victory over FC Alberes Argelès, in the seventh round of the Coupe de France. On 16 January 2020, Bertrand was given game time in the round of 32 of the Coupe de France against Girondins Bordeaux, in which Pau sensationally won 3–2 after extra-time. On 8 January 2021, Bertrand gave his league debut in a 3–1 defeat against Chambly. He decided to retire from professional football at the end of the 2021–22 season.

== Career statistics ==
=== Club ===
As of 1 February 2022

Appearances and goals by club, season and competition
Club	Season	League			Cup		Other		Total	
Club	Season	Division	Apps	Goals	Apps	Goals	Apps	Goals	Apps	Goals
Tours II	2009–10	Championnat National 3	0	0	–				0	0
Tours II	2010–11	Championnat National 3	3	0	–				3	0
Tours II	2011–12	Championnat National 3	18	0	–				18	0
Tours II	2012–13	Division d'Honneur	3	0	–				3	0
Tours II	2013–14	Championnat National 3	5	0	–				5	0
Tours II	Total		29	0	–				29	0
Tours	2011–12	Ligue 2	0	0	0	0	0	0	0	0
Tours	2012–13	Ligue 2	0	0	0	0	0	0	0	0
Tours	2013–14	Ligue 2	0	0	0	0	0	0	0	0
Tours	2014–15	Ligue 2	9	0	0	0	1	0	10	0
Tours	Total		9	0	0	0	1	0	10	0
Young Lions	2016	S.League	12	0	0	0	–		12	0
Francs Borains	2017–18	Third Amateur Division	10	0	–				10	0
Pau FC	2019–20	Championnat National	0	0	3	0	–		3	0
Pau FC	2020–21	Ligue 2	2	0	1	0	–		3	0
Pau FC	2021–22	Ligue 2	1	0	0	0	–		1	0
Pau FC	Total		3	0	4	0	–		7	0
Pau FC II	2019–20	Championnat National 3	1	0	–				1	0
Career total			64	0	4	0	1	0	69	0
