= Young Lions FC =

Association football club from Singapore

Young Lions
- Full name: Young Lions Football Club
- Nickname: Merlion Cubs
- Founded: 2002; 24 years ago
- Ground: Jalan Besar Stadium
- Capacity: 7,100
- Owner: Football Association of Singapore
- Chairman: Farehan Hussein
- Head coach: Firdaus Kassim
- League: Singapore Premier League
- 2025–26: Singapore Premier League, 7th of 9
Home colours	Away colours

Young Lions Football Club, commonly known as Young Lions, is a developmental football club based in Kallang, Singapore, which competes in the Singapore Premier League. The team is under the control of the Football Association of Singapore.

Young Lions are one of the few football clubs in the world made up of young Singaporean footballers serving their compulsory two-year national service, which places an age restriction on team members while playing in a top-flight professional league. Players are on loan from several local Singapore Premier League clubs, and would spend two years with the side before returning.

Young Lions play their home matches at the Jalan Besar Stadium. Their best league finish was third, which they achieved in 2004 and 2006.

== History ==
By entering the Young Lions into the S.League, the FAS hopes to expose young players to top-level competition, thus helping to prepare them for international tournaments such as the Southeast Asian Games. While the bulk of the Young Lions squad is made up of members of Singapore's national under-23 team, the club also takes in promising young foreign players (e.g. Luka Savić). However, foreign players are normally only recruited into the Young Lions squad if they could potentially change their nationality to Singaporean and be eligible to play international football for Singapore at some point in the future.

=== Malaysian domestic competition ===
In 2011, the Football Association of Singapore and the Football Association of Malaysia reached an agreement that would see greater cooperation between the two nations. One of the intended avenues would see Young Lions play in the Malaysian Super League and Malaysia Cup from 2012. The squad will be permitted up to five local players over the age of 14–16 players, as well as a number of overseas players in accordance with the quota set out by the rules of the Malaysian competitions. Ultimately, a new team was created, the LionsXII, while the Young Lions remained in the S.League.

=== National Football Academy ===
Most of the Young Lions players come from the NFA (National Football Academy) and new players (from the NFA) will be promoted to the Young Lions squad every season.

The National Football Academy enters both the Singapore NFA U-17 and Singapore NFA U-18 teams into the Prime League to allow their players to gain more exposure and match experience by playing against older and more established players.

=== Foreign players ===
In 2023, Young Lions signed the Japanese duo Jun Kobayashi and Kan Kobayashi from Albirex Niigata (S) becoming the first foreign players since France's Benjamin Bertrand from Tours in 2016. In preparation for the 2024–25 Singapore Premier League season, Young Lions signed two additional Japanese players, Kaisei Ogawa and Itsuki Enomoto, and the Australian Rashid Hayek from Western United, making it the first time the club had five foreigners in the squad. On 28 March 2025, Young Lions recorded their highest ever win during the 2024–25 Singapore Cup fixtures against Albirex Niigata (S) where Kaisei Ogawa became the second players in the club history to score four goals in one match since Zikos Chua against Tanjong Pagar United on 7 August 2022.

After a reshuffle in the Football Association of Singapore seeing Forrest Li as the FAS new president in 2025, Young Lions saw a major overhaul in the club during the 2025–26 season where they signed a new partnership with Denmark manufacturing company Select, ending a deal with Nike after 17 years. The club also got a main sponsor for the front of their jersey with Chinese state-owned automobile company, Dongfeng. Young Lions also went on to sign a few youngsters from Brazil, including Abner Vinicius, Joilson, Lucas Agueiro and Sérgio Mendonça while they loaned a few under-21 foreign players from Lion City Sailors, such as Enrico Walmrath, Harry Spence and Benjamin Žerak. Needing an experience local players in the squad, Young Lions than recruited Izwan Mahbud and Abdil Qaiyyim Mutalib to strengthen the team.

In the 2026–27 season, Young Lions focus their attention on recruiting Japanese players where they would sign Shuya Yamashita, Miyu Sato, Daisuke Sakai, Toi Kagami and Hisatoshi Nishido. The club also signed EFL League Two player Kai Whitmore, who previously played for Newport County. Young Lions than recruited experience local player, Hafiz Nor to strengthen the team midfield.

== Stadium ==
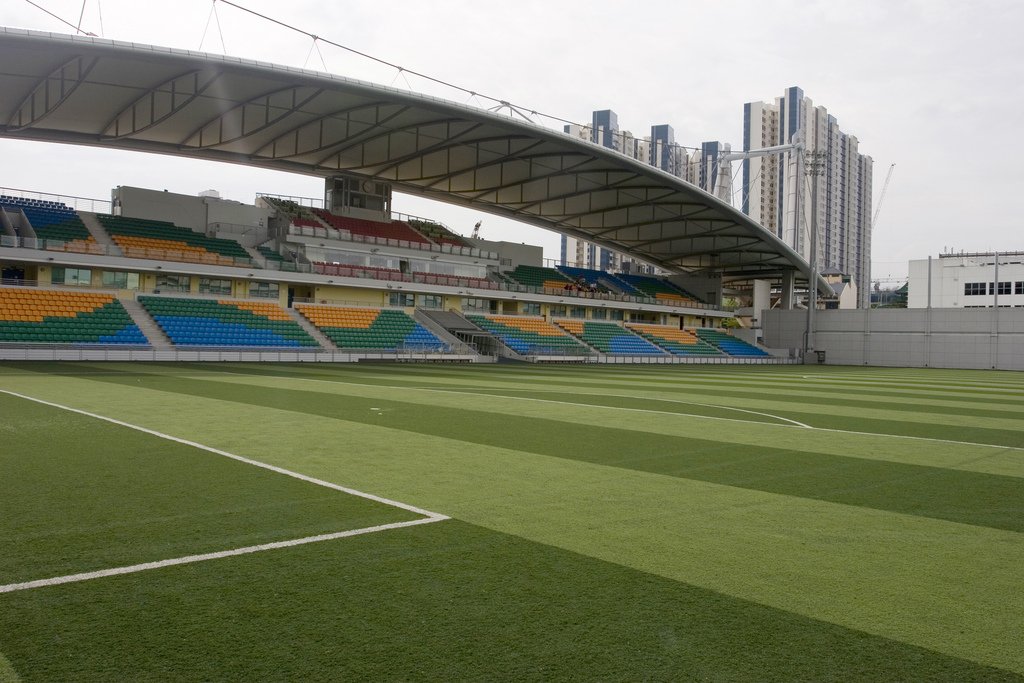
Pitchside view of the Jalan Besar Stadium in November 2008

Young Lions have played at the Jalan Besar Stadium since their inception of participating in the S.League. The stadium can hold a seating capacity of 8,000. In 2012, As part of the LionsXII's sponsorship by Kingsmen, a local fan club, the King George's Stand was built using a removable stand, increasing the stadium's capacity to 10,000.

On 30 October 2012, an LED scoreboard was implemented at the Gallery stand to provide better quality video to the spectators, allowing replay video highlights of the action on the field during matchdays. Two new screens were also placed at the two ends of the Grandstand, North and South, to enable better match experience for the Gallery fans.

== Kit suppliers and naming history ==
Young Lions kit was manufactured by local brand Tiger who than collaborate with Italian sportswear Diadora. The club was than sponsor by Japanese brand Maxell. In 2008, Young Lions alongside the Singapore national team kit was than manufactured by Nike. From 2011, Young Lions was sponsored by Courts where the club began to change it name to Courts Young Lions until 2015 where they was than sponsored by Garena thus changing the name to Garena Young Lions until 2017.

In August 2025, Young Lions signed a deal with Danish sportswear Select ending a 17 years contract with Nike. The club also partners with Chinese state-owned automobile company, Dongfeng, as the club main sponsor. In October 2026, Young Lions announced Playback as their official sleeve sponsor.

Period	Kit manufacturer	Main sponsor
2003–2007	(Singapore) Tiger (Collaboration with Diadora)	(Japan) Maxell
2008–2010	(United States) Nike	No sponsors
2011–2015	(United States) Nike	(Singapore) Courts
2016–2017	(United States) Nike	(Singapore) Garena
2017–2025	(United States) Nike	No sponsors
2025–2026	(Denmark) Select	(China) Dongfeng
2026–present	(Germany) Adidas	(China) Dongfeng

Club name history
Year	Sponsors	Club name	References
2011–2015	(Singapore) Courts	Courts Young Lions	
2016–2017	(Singapore) Garena	Garena Young Lions	

== Players ==
=== First-team squad ===
As of 13 September 2026

Note: Flags indicate national team as defined under FIFA eligibility rules; some limited exceptions apply. Players may hold more than one non-FIFA nationality.

No.	Pos.	Nation	Player
1	GK	SGP	Izwan Mahbud (captain)
2	DF	SGP	Fairuz Fazli
3	DF	SGP	Luth Harith
4	DF	JPN	Shuya Yamashita
5	DF	SGP	Ikram Mikhaill
6	MF	SGP	Ajay Robson (on loan from Hougang United)
7	MF	SGP	Nathan Mao (on loan from Lion City Sailors)
8	DF	WAL	Kai Whitmore
9	FW	JPN	Miyu Sato
10	MF	JPN	Daisuke Sakai (on loan from PSM Makassar)
11	MF	SGP	Hafiz Nor
13	GK	SLO	Benjamin Žerak (on loan from Lion City Sailors)
14	MF	SGP	Danial Herwan
15	MF	JPN	Toi Kagami

No.	Pos.	Nation	Player
16	DF	SGP	Andy Reefqy
17	DF	SGP	Iryan Fandi (on loan from Hougang United)
20	MF	SGP	Rae Peh
21	MF	SGP	Harith Danish
22	MF	SGP	Joel Chew (on loan from Tampines Rovers)
23	MF	SGP	Garv Sahoo
24	FW	SGP	Louka Tan (on loan from Hougang United)
25	MF	SGP	Caelan Cheong (on loan from Tampines Rovers)
36	MF	JPN	Hisatoshi Nishido (on loan from Renofa Yamaguchi)
37	MF	SGP	Josh Tan
66	DF	SGP	Abdil Qaiyyim Mutalib (vice-captain)

=== 'B' squad ===
As of 13 September 2026

The Young Lions B squad compromise players mostly active representing the team in the Singapore Premier League 2

Note: Flags indicate national team as defined under FIFA eligibility rules; some limited exceptions apply. Players may hold more than one non-FIFA nationality.

No.	Pos.	Nation	Player
26	MF	SGP	Nyqil Iyyan
27	FW	SGP	Sarrvin Raj
28	DF	SGP	Nur Muhammad Fadly
29	DF	SGP	Iliya Naufal
30	GK	SGP	Jeremy Quan
31	MF	SGP	Aryan Sahib
32	MF	SGP	Kieran Tan
33	MF	SGP	Farrel Farhan (on loan from Lion City Sailors)
34	MF	SGP	Lukyan Tan-Vaissiere
35	MF	SGP	Elijah Srinvasa
38	FW	SGP	Uchenna Eziakor
40	MF	SGP	Loo Kai Sheng

No.	Pos.	Nation	Player
41	DF	SGP	Erdy Thaqib
42	MF	SGP	Jovan Ang
43	DF	SGP	Ayden Haziq
44	DF	SGP	Ilhan Rizqullah
45	GK	SGP	Kenneth Ng (on loan from Lion City Sailors)
46	GK	SGP	Seth Lee (on loan from Lion City Sailors)
47	MF	SGP	Ryan Vishal
48	MF	SGP	Zaki Jumlan
49	MF	SGP	Casey Klein

== Management and staff ==
Position	Name
Team manager	(Singapore) Sakthi Vel Ganesan
Head coach	(Singapore) Firdaus Kassim
Assistant coach	(Singapore) Fadzuhasny Juraimi (Singapore) Afiq Yahya
Goalkeeper coach	(Singapore) Ahmadulhaq Che Omar
Fitness coach	(Singapore) Donald Wan
Physiotherapist	(Singapore) Alex Poon
Sports trainer	(Singapore) Ryan Wang (Singapore) Jasmori Rasip
Equipment officer	(Singapore) Omar Mohamed

== Foreign players history ==
- (Australia) Craig Foster (1991)
- (Nigeria) Kazeem Babatunde (2003–2004)
- (Serbia) Vladan Seric (2004)
- (Nigeria) Greg Nwokolo (2005)
- (Cameroon) Moudourou Moise (2006–2008)
- (England) Daniel Hammond (2008)
- (Nigeria) Obadin Aikhena (2008–2009)
- (Serbia) Luka Savić (2010)
- (France) Sirina Camara (2012)
- (France) Jonathan Toto (2012–2013)
- (Canada) Sherif El-Masri (2012–2015)
- (Denmark) Benjamin Lee (2013)
- (Canada) Jordan Webb (2014–2016)
- (France) Benjamin Bertrand (2016)
- (Japan) Jun Kobayashi (2023–2025)
- (Japan) Kan Kobayashi (2023–2025)
- (Japan) Itsuki Enomoto (2024)
- (Japan) Kaisei Ogawa (2024–2025)
- (Australia) Rashid Hayek (2024–2025)
- (Brazil) Abner Vinicius (2025–2026)
- (Brazil) Sergio Mendonça (2025–2026)
- (Brazil) Lucas Agueiro (2025–2026)
- (Brazil) Joilson Lucas (2025–2026)
- (Brazil) Enrico Walmrath (2025–2026)
- (England) Harry Spence (2025–2026)
- (Japan) Shuya Yamashita (2026–present)
- (Japan) Miyu Sato (2026–present)
- (Japan) Toi Kagami (2026–present)
- (Japan) Daisuke Sakai (2026–present)
- (Japan) Hisatoshi Nishido (2026–present)

=== Internationally capped players ===
AFC/OFC: (Indonesia) Greg Nwokolo; (Japan) Daisuke Sakai	CAF: (Nigeria) Kazeem Babatunde	UEFA – NIL –	CONMEBOL/ CONCACAF: (Canada) Sherif El-Masri

== Coaching history ==
No.	Head coach	Years
1	(Singapore) P. N. Sivaji	1 January 2003 – 31 December 2003
2	(Denmark) Kim Poulsen	1 January 2004 – 31 December 2004
3	(Singapore) Fandi Ahmad	1 January 2005 – 31 December 2006
4	(Singapore) V. Sundramoorthy	1 January 2007 – 31 December 2008
5	(Singapore) Terry Pathmanathan	1 January 2009 – 13 January 2010
6	(Singapore) V. Sundramoorthy (2)	14 January 2010 – 31 December 2010
7	(Singapore) Robin Chitrakar	1 January 2011 – 13 January 2013
8	(Singapore) Aide Iskandar	14 January 2013 – 11 June 2015
9	(Germany) Jürgen Raab	1 July 2015 – 13 January 2016
10	(France) Richard Tardy	1 January 2016 – 15 February 2016
11	(France) Patrick Hesse	15 February 2016 – 9 November 2016
12	(Singapore) V. Selvaraj	9 November 2016 – 17 May 2017
13	(France) Richard Tardy (2)	17 May 2017 – 27 July 2017
14	(Singapore) Vincent Subramaniam	5 August 2017 – 14 December 2017
15	(Singapore) Fandi Ahmad (2)	14 December 2017 – 31 December 2019
16	(Singapore) Nazri Nasir	1 January 2020 – 10 March 2021
17	(Singapore) Philippe Aw	11 March 2021 – 31 December 2021
18	(Singapore) Nazri Nasir (2)	1 January 2022 – 31 December 2022
19	(Singapore) Philippe Aw (2)	1 January 2023 – 18 May 2023
20	(Singapore) Fadzuhasny Juraimi (interim)	18 May 2023 – 12 July 2023
21	(Singapore) Nazri Nasir (3)	13 July 2023 – 16 January 2025
22	(Singapore) Fadzuhasny Juraimi (interim) (2)	16 January 2025 – 25 June 2025
23	(Singapore) Firdaus Kassim	25 June 2025–present

== Records and statistics ==
As of 26 May 2026 after the 2025–26 season conclude.

=== Most appearances ===
Rank	Player	Years	Appearances
1	(Singapore) Afiq Yunos	2008–2013	132
2	(Singapore) Syahrul Sazali	2016–2019 2021–2022	101
2	(Singapore) Shahril Ishak	2003–2006	101
4	(Singapore) Hariss Harun	2007–2011	90
5	(Singapore) Amir Syafiz	2021–present	88
6	(Singapore) Syazwan Buhari	2010–2015	87
6	(Singapore) Amirul Adli	2011–2017	87
6	(Canada) Sherif El-Masri	2012–2015	87
9	(Singapore) Izwan Mahbud	2008–2011 2026–present	85
9	(Singapore) Faritz Abdul Hameed	2009–2012	83

=== Top scorers ===
Rank	Player	Appearances	Goals
1	(Singapore) Khairul Amri	79	49
2	(Singapore) Agu Casmir	34	31
3	(Singapore) Shahril Ishak	101	20
4	(Canada) Sherif El-Masri	87	18
4	(Singapore) Qiu Li	27	18
6	(Singapore) Khairul Nizam	57	15
7	(Canada) Jordan Webb	39	14
7	(Singapore) Shi Jiayi	66	14
9	(Singapore) Ilhan Fandi	33	13
9	(Japan) Itsuki Enomoto	19	13
10	(Singapore) Sahil Suhaimi	38	12

=== Team records ===
Biggest wins

- 7–1 vs Sinchi on 23 September 2004
- 7–1 vs Albirex Niigata (S) on 28 March 2025

Heaviest Defeats

- 1–10 vs Lion City Sailors (13 August 2022)

Youngest goal scorer

- Khairin Nadim, 16 years 6 months and 9 days (On 17 November 2020 vs Tampines Rovers)

Oldest goal scorer

- Khairul Amri, 31 years 6 months and 11 days (On 1 April 2023 vs Geylang International)

Youngest debutant

- Raoul Suhaimi, 15 years 7 months 27 days (15 May 2021 vs Albirex Niigata (S))

=== Notable Hat-tricks ===
Key
^{4}	Player scored four goals
*	Opponent was the home team

Notable players to scored a hat-trick for the club
Player	Score	Opponent	Date
(Singapore) Agu Casmir	7–1	Sinchi	23 September 2004
(Singapore) Qiu Li	5–0	Geylang United	22 March 2006
(Singapore) Khairul Amri	4–2	Woodlands Wellington	19 May 2006
(Singapore) Qiu Li (2)	0–5	Balestier Khalsa*	7 June 2006
(Singapore) Khairul Amri (2)	0–3	Sporting Afrique*	6 July 2006
(Singapore) Zikos Chua^{4}	4–2	Tanjong Pagar United	8 July 2022
(Japan) Kaisei Ogawa^{4}	7–1	Albirex Niigata (S)	28 March 2025

== Club captains ==
Position	Name
2004–2013	(Singapore) TBC
2014–2015	(Singapore) Al-Qaasimy Rahman
2016	(Singapore) Khairul Amri
2017	(Singapore) Shahrin Saberin
2018	(Singapore) Taufiq Muqminin
2019–2022	(Singapore) Jacob Mahler
2023	(Singapore) Harhys Stewart
2024–2025	(Singapore) Ryaan Sanizal
2025–present	(Singapore) Amir Syafiz

== Personal awards ==
=== Domestic ===
- League Young Player of the Year
  - (Singapore) Hariss Harun (2010)

=== Others ===
- People's Choice Award
  - (Singapore) Agu Casmir (2004)
  - (Singapore) Khairul Amri (2006)
  - (Singapore) Safuwan Baharudin (2011)

== Season by season record ==
Season	League	Pos.	Pld	W	D	L	GS	GA	Pts	Singapore Cup	League Cup
2003	S.League	12th	33	6	1–5	21	33	77	25	Quarter-finals	
2004	S.League	3rd	27	14	5	8	74	52	47	Quarter-finals	
2005	S.League	6th	27	12	6	9	44	37	42	Quarter-finals	
2006	S.League	3rd	30	15	7	8	67	43	52	Quarter-finals	
2007	S.League	5th	33	13	8	12	45	54	47	Preliminary	Withdrew
2008	S.League	9th	33	7	10	16	30	46	31	Semi-finals	Semi-finals
2009	S.League	8th	30	9	7	14	33	48	34	Preliminary	Group stage
2010	S.League	9th	33	9	12	12	37	45	34	Semi-finals	Preliminary
2011	S.League	9th	33	7	6	20	33	54	27	Withdrew	Withdrew
2012	S.League	10th	24	6	5	13	25	37	23	Withdrew	Group stage
2013	S.League	12th	27	5	3	19	20	52	18	Preliminary	Group stage
2014	S.League	10th	27	7	5	15	38	54	26	Did not participate	Did not participate
2015	S.League	9th	27	7	6	14	30	43	27	Did not participate	Did not participate
2016	S.League	9th	24	2	3	19	23	70	9	Preliminary	Did not participate
2017	S.League	9th	24	1	3	20	10	62	6	Did not participate	Did not participate
2018	Singapore Premier League	7th	24	5	6	13	25	46	21	Did not participate	
2019	Singapore Premier League	8th	24	6	4	14	21	38	22	Did not participate	
2020	Singapore Premier League	7th	14	3	0	11	12	38	9	Not Held	
2021	Singapore Premier League	7th	21	4	4	13	26	50	16	Not Held	
2022	Singapore Premier League	8th	28	2	2	24	34	103	8	Group Stage	
2023	Singapore Premier League	9th	24	1	2	21	24	76	5	Group Stage	
2024–25	Singapore Premier League	8th	32	7	8	17	47	89	29	Group Stage	
2025–26	Singapore Premier League	8th	21	2	3	16	15	58	9	Group Stage	

- 2003 saw the introduction of penalty shoot-outs if a match ended in a draw in regular time. Winners of penalty shoot-outs gained two points instead of one.

== See also ==
- Singapore FA
