= Miyu Sato =

Japanese professional golfer (born 2003)

Miyu Sato 佐藤 心結
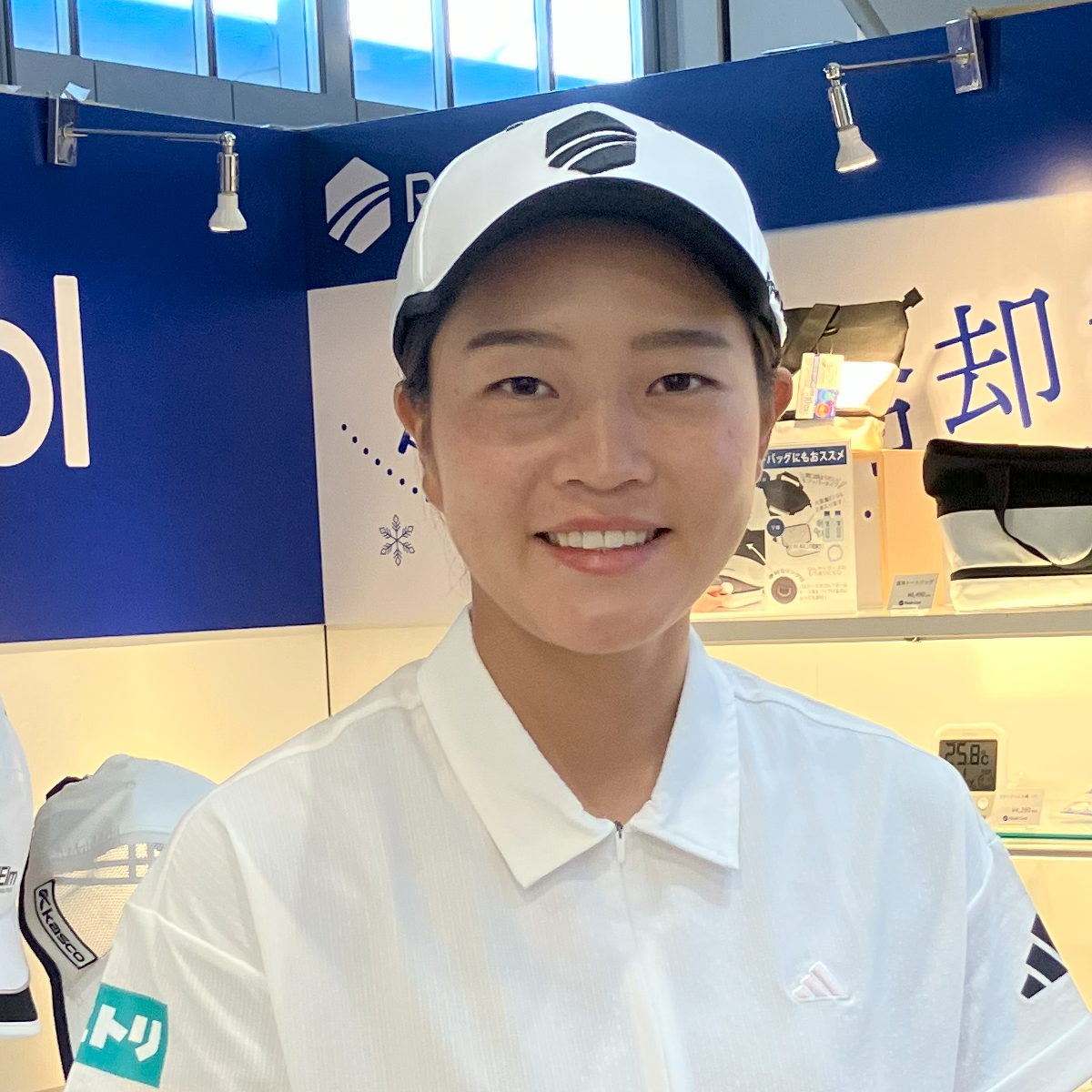
- Sato in August 2025

Personal information
- Nicknames: Miyu-chan, Satomiyu, Miyu-chin
- Nationality: Japan
- Born: 21 July 2003 (age 23) Odawara, Kanagawa, Japan
- Height: 161 cm (5 ft 3 in)

Career
- Sport: Golf
- Turned professional: 2022
- Current tour: LPGA of Japan Tour
- Professional wins: 1

Number of wins by tour
- LPGA of Japan Tour: 1

Best results in LPGA major championships
- Chevron Championship: DNP
- Women's PGA C'ship: DNP
- U.S. Women's Open: T53: 2023
- Women's British Open: DNP
- Evian Championship: DNP

Miyu Sato (佐藤 心結, Sato Miyu) (born 21 July 2003) is a female Japanese professional golfer. She plays on the LPGA of Japan Tour (JLPGA) where she has one win. She belongs to the Diamond Generation.

== Early life and amateur career ==
Sato, who is from a family of four with one older brother, was born in Odawara, Kanagawa Prefecture, Japan. She began to play golf at the age of 7 when her grandfather gave her a set of golf clubs as a Christmas present. During elementary school, she also played soccer and was a shot-putter during junior high.

While attending Sakurai Elementary School of Odawara City (sixth grade), she placed third in the Kanagawa Prefectural Junior Golf Championship (girls division), and tied for third place in the East Japan Division of the PGM World Junior Golf Championship Japan for Japan national team selection.

In 2018, as a senior of Johoku Junior High School in Odawara City (9th grade), she placed second in the Kanagawa Prefectural Amateur Golf Championship (12–14 age division) and tied for fourth in the Kanto Junior High School Golf Championship Spring Tournament (girls division).

She attended Meishu Gakuen Hitachi High School in Ibaraki Prefecture, renowned for golf, where she contributed to the team's second-place finish in the team division of the Kanto High School Golf Championship in 2019 as a freshman (10th grade) and in 2021 as a senior (12th grade). In individual competitions, in 2019 she tied for fourth place in the Kanto High School Golf Championship Winter Tournament, and in 2021 placed third in the Japan Women's Amateur Golf Championship, tied for second place in the Kanto Junior Golf Championship (15–17 girls division), won the Golf Digest Japan Junior Cup (15–17 girls division), and tied for fourth place in the Japan Junior Golf Championship (15–17 girls division).

In 2020, Sato made a LPGA Tour of Japan debut by playing in the Golf 5 Ladies Professional Golf Tournament (4–6 September) as a high school junior but fell two strokes short of the cutline. At the Stanley Ladies Golf Tournament (8–10 October), she played in as a high school senior, she started off in a second place tie for day one with a 5 under par score, rose to a first place tie with on day two with at eight under par, and finished at ten under par on the final day in a four-way tie with Hinako Shibuno, Sungwoo Bae, and Ayako Kimura. In the second round of the playoffs, her near-perfect shot hit the pin and unfortunately bounced away, and she was denied a birdie on the ensuing putt, which turned out to be the difference, and she lost out to Shibuno.

In the late fall of the same year, she qualified for JLPGA Player Certification (2–5 November) on her first attempt with a fourth-place finish to become a member of the 94th class.

== Professional career ==
=== 2021 ===
In the Final Qualifying Tournament (30 November – 3 December), Sato placed 11th, the highest among the 6 players of the so-called Diamond Generation of women’s golf, which includes Haruka Kawasaki, Amiyu Ozeki, Kokona Sakurai, Rio Takeda, Yumeka Kobayashi, and herself, making it on their first tries. The high outing earned her the right to play on the LPGA of the Japan Tour till the 1st re-ranking of the following year.

=== 2022 ===
In February, it was announced that Sato had signed an affiliation agreement with the Nitori Corporation.

In Sato's professional debut, the Daikin Orchid Ladies Golf Tournament (3–6 March), she finished in a 13th-place tie. At the Nichirei Ladies Tournament (17–19 June), she shot a 64, her personal best then to take the first-day lead, held on to first place for the second day, but ultimately finished in 5th place, which happened to be her first top 10 finish. She recorded a 29 for the second half on day one, tying her for the third-best score of all time for a par 36 half. At the JLPGA Championship Konica Minolta Cup, one of the four Japanese majors, she made a 4th place finish. At the Masters GC Ladies Tournament (20–23 October), she made a strong showing with a score of 65 on the final day but finished one stroke shy of the winner, Kawasaki, and had to settle for a second-place tie with Yui Kawamoto.

Sato placed 10th in the 1st re-ranking and then 2nd in the 2nd re-ranking, allowing her to play out the whole season in her 1st year as a professional. She is the only one among the 6 first-time qualifying players who did not have to play in the LPGA of Japan StepUp Tour in their rookie year, which is the lower developmental circuit for players without LPGA of Japan Tour exemptions. Overall, in her first year, she competed in 37 tournaments, placed three top 10 finishes, and ranked 26th in the prize money rankings. Her Mercedes point ranking of 29th earned her her first priority seed, awarded to the top 50 players. With the priority seed, she secured competition to the full for the following year.

=== 2023 ===
At the Resort Trust Ladies Tournament (25–28 May), Sato came in sole 2nd place, gradually closing the gap from T12 on day 1, but was unable to catch Miyu Yamashita the winner.

Sato qualified for the U.S. Women's Open by placing second behind Akie Iwai in the 1-day 36-hole Japan Regional Final Qualifier (29 May). In the tournament (6–9 July), she made the cut and finished in a 53rd-place tie with a score of 11-over-par (75-75-78-71).

In her second year as a professional, Sato competed in 36 tournaments, racked up four top-10 finishes, ranked 38th in prize money, and 39th in Mercedes point rankings. Thus, she maintained her priority seed for the second consecutive year.

=== 2024 ===
Although Sato struggled from the start of the year, she tied for third place at the Golf 5 Ladies Professional Golf Tournament (30 August – 1 September), which was shortened to 36 holes due to heavy rain caused by a typhoon. At the Stanley Ladies Honda Golf Tournament (4–6 October), she moved up to a 1st-place tie on the second day with a score of eleven under par from a 4th-place tie on day 1 at six under par. On the final day, she fell three strokes behind the leader in the first half, but made an impressive comeback in the second half, scoring four consecutive birdies in one stretch in the final stage to win her first tournament with a total score of 15 under par, tying the tournament record. She thus avenged her heartbreaking playoff loss three years earlier.

In her third year as a professional, Sato competed in 35 tournaments, won one, earned two top-10 finishes, ranked 33rd in prize money, and ranked 53rd in the Mercedes point rankings. The win assured her a spot on the LPGA of Japan Tour for the whole following year.

=== 2025 ===
By winning the Stanley Ladies Honda Golf Tournament the previous year, Sato earned a place at the Honda LPGA Thailand Tournament (20–23 February), open to only 72 players, her second overseas LPGA tournament. She played consistent golf, scoring under par for all four days, finishing tied for 30th at −7 (70-71-70-70).

On the first day of the Meiji Yasuda Ladies Golf Tournament (10–13 July), which was shortened to 54 holes with a first-ever spectator lock-out due to a bear appearing incident, she tied for the lead with a personal best of nine under par (63 strokes) with nine birdies, including seven in a row. On the second day, she shot a 69 to maintain her lead at twelve under par, but on the final day, with seven players tied for the lead at one point, she ended up one stroke behind Sakura Koiwai, the eventual winner. At the Sony Japan Ladies PGA Championship (11–14 September), one of the four Japanese majors, from a 3rd-place tie on day 1 with a score of three under par, she scored the day’s best score of seven under par 65 on day 2 to take the sole lead and held on to the lead as a tie on day 3 although she could not improve her score. On the final day, she unfortunately shot a four over par for a total of six under par and ended up tied for sixth place.

In the Qualifying Stage (15–18 October, Plantation Golf & Country Club, Venice, Florida) for next season's LPGA Tour card, Sato finished with a total of +1 (71-75-74-69) for an 81-place tie and could not make the cutline of 45 required for qualifying for the Final Qualifying Stage.

In her fourth year as a professional, Sato competed in 35 tournaments, placed eight top-10 finishes, ranked 22nd in prize money, and ranked 22nd in the Mercedes point rankings. She thus secured her fourth consecutive priority seed.

=== 2026 ===
At the Japan Women's Open Golf Championship (1–4 October), Sato finished at sole 3rd place with a score of −7 (70-70-65-68) for her best outing of the season thus far.

== Personal life ==
Sato's parents named her Miyu (心結) with the hope that she would grow up to connect with many others heart-to-heart, with the original meanings of “mi” or more generally “kokoro” (心) being “mind” and “yu” or more generally “musubu” (結) being “connect.”

Sato's power meals are Sweet and Sour Pork and a Japanese hot pot called “Mizutaki.” She also likes Chilled Chinese Noodles and Green Peppers. She likes to listen to Japanese pop music and is a fan of the Japanese artist Yorushika. She is also a sports fan and goes to watch baseball and soccer games when she has the time.

== Amateur wins ==
- 2021 Golf Digest Japan Junior Cup (15–17 girls division)

== Professional wins (1) ==
=== LPGA of Japan Tour wins (1) ===
No.	Date	Tournament	Winning score	To par	Margin of victory	Runner(s)-up
1	6 Oct 2024	Stanley Ladies Honda Golf Tournament	66-67-68=201	−15	2 strokes	(Japan) Yui Kawamoto (Japan) Amiyu Ozeki

== Results in LPGA majors ==
Tournament	2023
Chevron Championship	
U.S. Women's Open	T53
Women's PGA Championship	
The Evian Championship	
Women's British Open	

Did not play

T = tied

== World ranking ==
Position in Women's World Golf Rankings at the end of each calendar year.

Year	Ranking	Source
2022	105	
2023	205	
2024	206	
2025	156	
