= Toi Kagami =

Japanese footballer

Personal information
- Full name: Toi Kagami
- Date of birth: 15 February 1999 (age 27)
- Place of birth: Yamanashi, Japan
- Height: 1.71 m (5 ft 7 in)
- Position: Midfielder

Team information
- Current team: Thespa Gunma
- Number: 11

Youth career
- 2011–2016: Ventforet Kofu

College career
Years	Team	Apps	(Gls)
2017–2020	Toin University of Yokohama		

Senior career*
Years	Team	Apps	(Gls)
2021–2025	Iwate Grulla Morioka	102	(12)
2025–	Thespa Gunma	28	(2)
- * Club domestic league appearances and goals as of 25 August 2026

Toi Kagami (加々美 登生, Kagami Toi; born 15 February 1999) is a Japanese footballer currently playing as a midfielder for Thespa Gunma.

== Career ==
Kagami made his league debut for Iwate against Gainare Tottori on 21 March 2021. He scored his first league goal for the club against Vanraure Hachinohe on 11 April 2021.

== Career statistics ==
=== Club ===
As of 20 March 2021.

Club	Season	League			National Cup		League Cup		Other		Total	
Club	Season	Division	Apps	Goals	Apps	Goals	Apps	Goals	Apps	Goals	Apps	Goals
Toin University of Yokohama	2020	–			2 (Note: Appearances in the Emperor's Cup)	2	–		0	0	2	2
Iwate Grulla Morioka	2021	J3 League	1	0	0	0	–		0	0	1	0
Career total			1	0	2	2	0	0	0	0	2	2
