= Sergio Mendonça =

Brazilian footballer (born 2004)

Personal information
- Full name: Sergio de Mendonça Siqueira Filho
- Date of birth: 22 January 2004 (age 22)
- Place of birth: Brazil
- Height: 1.91 m (6 ft 3 in)
- Position: Forward

Team information
- Current team: Isenmulang Kalteng
- Number: 99

Senior career*
Years	Team	Apps	(Gls)
–2022	Maricá	1	(0)
2022–2024	Botafogo U20	0	(0)
2023–2024	América Futebol Clube (RN)	0	(0)
2025	Maricá	6	(0)
2025–2026	Young Lions	19	(8)
2026–	Isenmulang Kalteng	1	(0)
- * Club domestic league appearances and goals as of 4 September 2026

Sergio de Mendonça Siqueira Filho (born 22 January 2004), is a Brazilian professional footballer who plays as a striker for Super League club Isenmulang Kalteng.

== Club career ==
Mendonça spent his early career in Brazil at a young age with Maricá.

On 5 January 2022, Mendonça moved to Botafogo U20 and stayed for 18 months before moving away.

=== América-RN ===
On 10 June 2023, Mendonça signed for Série D club América-RN on loan.

=== Return to Maricá ===
On 1 January 2025, Mendonca returned to his former club Maricá.

=== Young Lions ===
On 1 July 2025, he moved overseas to Singapore, joining Singapore Premier League club Young Lions. On 21 September 2025, he scored his first league goal in his debut match against Balestier Khalsa despite losing 2–1. On 25 October 2025, he scored the opening goal in a 1–3 lose over Geylang International. During the 2025–26 season, he scored 15 goals and recorded one assist in 24 matches, playing a total of 1,914 minutes across all competitions with Young Lions.

=== Isenmulang Kalteng ===
On 23 August 2026, Mendonça moved to Indonesia and signed with Super League club Isenmulang Kalteng ahead of the 2026–27 season. He made his league debut for Isenmulang Kalteng on 4 September 2026, in a 4–0 away lose over Arema at the Kanjuruhan Stadium.

== Career statistics ==
=== Club ===
As of 25 Oct 2026.

Club	Season	League			State League		Cup		Continental		Total	
Club	Season	Division	Apps	Goals	Apps	Goals	Apps	Goals	Apps	Goals	Apps	Goals
Maricá	2022; 2022	Série D Campeonato Carioca	0	0	0	0	1	0	0	0	1	0
Maricá	Total		0	0	0	0	1	0	0	0	1	0
Botafogo U20	2023; 2023	Série A Campeonato Carioca	0	0	0	0	0	0	0	0	0	0
Botafogo U20	2024; 2024	Série A Campeonato Carioca	0	0	0	0	1 (Note: appearances in Copinha)	0	0	0	1	0
Botafogo U20	Total		0	0	0	0	1	0	0	0	1	0
América Futebol Clube (RN)	2023; 2023	Série D Campeonato Potiguar	0	0	0	0	0	0	0	0	0	0
América Futebol Clube (RN)	2024; 2024	Série D Campeonato Potiguar	0	0	0	0	3 (Note: appearances in Copinha)	2	0	0	3	2
América Futebol Clube (RN)	Total		0	0	0	0	3	2	0	0	3	2
Maricá	2025; 2025	Série D Campeonato Carioca	4	0	6	1	0	0	0	0	10	0
Maricá	Total		4	0	6	1	0	0	0	0	10	0
Young Lions	2025–26	Singapore Premier League	19	8	0	0	0	0	0	0	19	8
Young Lions	Total		19	8	0	0	0	0	0	0	19	8
Isenmulang Kalteng	2026–27	Super League	4	0	0	0	0	0	0	0	4	0
Career total			27	8	6	1	5	2	0	0	38	11
