= 2010 Muangthong United F.C. season =

Muangthong United
2010 season
- Chairman: Pongsak Phol-Anan
- Manager: René Desaeyere
- Stadium: Yamaha Stadium
- Thai Premier League: Champions
- 2010 Thai FA Cup: Runner Up
- Thai League Cup: Third round
- Kor Royal Cup: Winners
- AFC Champions League: Playoff Stage
- 2010 AFC Cup: Semi Final
- Top goalscorer: Dagno Siaka (15)
Home colours	Away colours	Third colours

The 2010 season is Muangthong United's second season in the Thai Premier League of Muangthong United Football Club.

== Pre-season and friendlies ==
Date	Opponents	H / A	Result F–A	Scorer(s)

== Kor Royal Cup ==
Date	Opponents	H / A	Result F–A	Scorer(s)
20 February 2010	Thai Port	N	2-0	Koné 62', Siaka 81'

== Thai Premier League ==
Date	Opponents	H / A	Result F–A	Scorers
20 March 2010	Sisaket	A	1-2 report	Kouakou 34', Soumahoro 46'
3 April 2010	Rajnavy Rayong	H	1-0 report	Siaka 87'
11 April 2010	Thai Port	A	1-4 report	Datsakorn 45', Siaka (2) 64' 86', Kouakou 90'
17 April 2010	Bangkok United	H	5-1 report	Siaka 9' 44', Teerasil 30', Nattaporn 58', Kouakou 88'
24 April 2010	Bangkok Glass	A	1-0 report	
5 May 2010	Buriram PEA	H	0-0 report	
23 May 2010	BEC Tero Sasana	H	2-0 report	Teerasil 52', Kouakou 90'
28 May 2010	Chonburi	H	4-1 report	Siaka 32', Koné 52', Soumahoro 68', Teerasil 71'
6 June 2010	Pattaya United	H	1-0 report	Siaka 75'
13 June 2010	Osotspa Saraburi	A	3-0	Datsakorn 61', Kouakou 70', Koné 80'
20 June 2010	Royal Thai Army	A	2-2	Koné 30', Ronnachai 49', Pichitphong 90'
26 June 2010	Samut Songkhram	H	5-0	Siaka 4', Soumahoro 39' 78', Koné 68', Teeratep 88'
30 June 2010	TTM Phichit	A	0-2	Koné 6', Kouakou 62'
3 July 2010	TOT-CAT	H	4-0	Pichitphong 3', Nattaporn 39', Siaka 65', Teerasil 68'
10 July 2010	Police United	A	1-0	
17 July 2010	Sisaket	H	6-0	Soumahoro 16', Koné 20', Teerasil 24', Datsakorn 66', Jakkraphan 81', Amorn 90'
25 July 2010	Chonburi	A	0-0	
28 July 2010	Rajnavy Rayong	A	1-2	Koné 19', Yannick 90' (o.g.)
8 August 2010	Thai Port	H	1-0	Teeratep 86'
14 August 2010	Bangkok United	A	0-3	Datsakorn 59', Siaka 87', Jakkraphan 90'
18 August 2010	Bangkok Glass	H	2-0	Koné 13', Teerasil 38'
22 August 2010	Buriram PEA	A	1-0	
10 September 2010	Police United	H	1-0	Teerasil 40'
26 September 2010	Pattaya United	A	2-2	Coulibaly 56', Koné 60'
29 September 2010	Osotspa Saraburi	H	4-1	Siaka 4' 75', Piyapol 59' Kouakou 79'
8 October 2010	Royal Thai Army	H	3-3	Nattaporn 66', Amorn 79', Siaka 80'
11 October 2010	BEC Tero Sasana	A	0-1	Siaka 60'
14 October 2010	TTM Phichit	H	2-2	Kouakou 8', Koné 39'
22 October 2010	Samut Songkhram	A	0-0	
24 October 2010	TOT-CAT	A	1-2	Kouakou 71', Siaka 88'

=== League table ===
Pos	Team	Pld	W	D	L	GF	GA	GD	Pts	Qualification or relegation
1	Muangthong United (C, Q)	30	20	7	3	64	19	+45	67	2011 AFC Champions League play-off round
2	Buriram PEA	30	17	12	1	51	19	+32	63	
3	Chonburi (Q)	30	17	9	4	57	28	+29	60	2011 AFC Cup Group stage round (Note: via FA Cup winners)
4	Thai Port	30	13	9	8	41	29	+12	48	
5	Bangkok Glass	30	12	9	9	48	38	+10	45	

Updated to match(es) played on 24 October 2010. Source: FIFA.com
Rules for classification: 1st points; 2nd head-to-head; 3rd match win; 4th goal difference; 5th number of goals scored
(C) Champions; (Q) Qualified for the phase indicated

== Thai FA Cup ==
Date	Opponents	H / A	Result F–A	Scorers	Round
16 June 2010	Ban Beung-Nawa nakhon	H	11-0	Nattaporn (2) 22' 51', Ronnachai (5) 24' 53' 55' 62' 90', Teeratep (2) 33' 60', Jakkaphan 30', Lambin 83',	Third round
26 August 2010	Air Force United	H	4-0	Siaka 36', Kouakou (2) 45' 90', Koné 57',	Fourth round
26 October 2010	Raj Pracha-Nonthaburi	H	4-0	Kouakou 13', Teerasil 32', Siaka 38', Kittipong 49' (o.g.)	Quarter-Finals
30 October 2010	Rajnavy Rayong	A	0-1	Teerasil 26'	Semi-Finals
28 November 2010	Chonburi	N	1-2	Datsakorn 59'	Finals

== Thai League Cup ==
Date	Opponents	H / A	Result F–A	Scorers	Round
29 August 2010	Samut Prakan	A	1–2	Narongchai 37', Naruphol 64'	First round
1 September 2010	Samut Prakan	H	1–1		First round
8 September 2010	Air Force United	A	2–0		Second round
15 September 2010	Air Force United	H	1–4	Ronnachai 1', Coulibaly (3) 10' 15' 92'	Second round
22 September 2010	Sisaket	A	1–0		Third round
4 November 2010	Sisaket	H	0–2		Third round

== AFC Champions League ==
Date	Opponents	H / A	Result F–A	Scorers	Round
31 January 2010	SHB Đà Nẵng	A	0-3 Report	Panupong 33', Kouakou 45', Jakkaphan 81'	Play-off
6 February 2010	Singapore Armed Forces	A	0–0 (4–3p) Report		Play-off

== AFC Cup ==
Date	Opponents	H / A	Result F–A	Scorers	Round
24 February 2010	South China	A	0-0 Report		Group G, Match Day 1
23 March 2010	VB Sports Club	H	3-1 Report	Soumahoro 34', Koné 83', Teeratep 85'	Group G, Match Day 2
27 March 2010	Persiwa Wamena	H	4-1 Report	Koné 26', Teeratep 50', Soumahoro 64', Panupong 89'	Group G, Match Day 3
7 April 2010	VB Sports Club	A	2-3 Report	Piyachart 55', Soumahoro 57' 70'	Group G, Match Day 4
20 April 2010	South China	H	0-1 Report		Group G, Match Day 5
27 April 2010	Persiwa Wamena	A	2-2 Report	Datsakorn 14', Koné 65'	Group G, Match Day 6

Group G Table

Team	Pld	W	D	L	GF	GA	GD	Pts
(Hong Kong) South China	6	4	1	1	12	5	+7	13
(Thailand) Muangthong United	6	3	2	1	12	7	+5	11
(Maldives) VB Sports Club	6	3	0	3	12	11	+1	9
(Indonesia) Persiwa Wamena	6	0	1	5	8	21	−13	1

=== Knockout phase ===
Date	Opponents	H / A	Result F–A	Scorers	Round
23 June 2009	Al-Rayyan	A	1–1 (2–4p)	Teerasil 17'	Round of 16
14 September 2010	Al-Karamah	A	1–0		Quarter finals
21 September 2010	Al-Karamah	H	2–0	Datsakorn 25', Siaka 37'	Quarter finals
5 October 2010	Al-Ittihad	H	1–0	Siaka 9'	Semi-finals
19 October 2010	Al-Ittihad	A	2–0		Semi-finals

== Squad statistics ==
No.	Pos.	Name	League		FA Cup		League Cup		Kor Royal Cup		Asia		Total		Discipline	
No.	Pos.	Name	Apps	Goals	Apps	Goals	Apps	Goals	Apps	Goals	Apps	Goals	Apps	Goals	Yellow card	Red card
1	GK	(Thailand) Thanongsak Panpipat	0	0	0	0	0	0	0	0	0	0	0	0	0	0
3	DF	(Thailand) Prakasit Sansook	0	0	0	0	0	0	0	0	0	0	0	0	0	0
4	DF	(Thailand) Panupong Wongsa	0	0	0	0	0	0	0	0	0	0	0	0	0	0
5	DF	(Thailand) Jetsada Jitsawad (vc)	0	0	0	0	0	0	0	0	0	0	0	0	0	0
6	DF	(Thailand) Nattaporn Phanrit (c)	0	0	0	0	0	0	0	0	0	0	0	0	0	0
7	MF	(Thailand) Datsakorn Thonglao	0	0	0	0	0	0	0	0	0	0	0	0	0	0
8	MF	(Thailand) Jakkraphan Kaewprom	0	0	0	0	0	0	0	0	0	0	0	0	0	0
9	FW	(Thailand) Ronnachai Rangsiyo	0	0	0	0	0	0	0	0	0	0	0	0	0	0
10	FW	(Thailand) Teerasil Dangda	0	0	0	0	0	0	0	0	0	0	0	0	0	0
11	DF	(Thailand) Piyachart Tamaphan	0	0	0	0	0	0	0	0	0	0	0	0	0	0
13	FW	(Ivory Coast) Christian Kouakou	0	0	0	0	0	0	0	0	0	0	0	0	0	0
15	MF	(Ivory Coast) Abdoul Coulibaly	0	0	0	0	0	0	0	0	0	0	0	0	0	0
16	DF	(Thailand) Paitoon Nontadee	0	0	0	0	0	0	0	0	0	0	0	0	0	0
17	FW	(Ivory Coast) Ibrahim Kanouté	0	0	0	0	0	0	0	0	0	0	0	0	0	0
18	MF	(Thailand) Naruphol Ar-Romsawa	0	0	0	0	0	0	0	0	0	0	0	0	0	0
19	MF	(Thailand) Pichitphong Choeichiu	0	0	0	0	0	0	0	0	0	0	0	0	0	0
20	MF	(Thailand) Amorn Thammanarm	0	0	0	0	0	0	0	0	0	0	0	0	0	0
21	MF	(Ivory Coast) Dagno Siaka	0	0	0	0	0	0	0	0	0	0	0	0	0	0
22	FW	(Ivory Coast) Mohamed Koné	0	0	0	0	0	0	0	0	0	0	0	0	0	0
23	MF	(Thailand) Piyapol Bantao	0	0	0	0	0	0	0	0	0	0	0	0	0	0
26	GK	(Thailand) Kawin Thamsatchanan	0	0	0	0	0	0	0	0	0	0	0	0	0	0
27	DF	(Thailand) Wittawin Klorwutthiwat	0	0	0	0	0	0	0	0	0	0	0	0	0	0
28	MF	(Japan) Nobuyuki Zaizen	0	0	0	0	0	0	0	0	0	0	0	0	0	0
29	DF	(Thailand) Sassanapong Wattayuchutikool	0	0	0	0	0	0	0	0	0	0	0	0	0	0
30	MF	(Thailand) Narongchai Vachiraban	0	0	0	0	0	0	0	0	0	0	0	0	0	0
31	MF	(Thailand) Santipap Ratniyorm	0	0	0	0	0	0	0	0	0	0	0	0	0	0
32	GK	(Thailand) Theerawat Pinpradub	0	0	0	0	0	0	0	0	0	0	0	0	0	0
33	DF	(Thailand) Nawapol Tantraseni	0	0	0	0	0	0	0	0	0	0	0	0	0	0
34	MF	(Thailand) Krittipol Paphunga	0	0	0	0	0	0	0	0	0	0	0	0	0	0
35	DF	(Thailand) Weerawut Kayem	0	0	0	0	0	0	0	0	0	0	0	0	0	0
36	MF	(Thailand) Woranat Thongkruea	0	0	0	0	0	0	0	0	0	0	0	0	0	0
37	MF	(Thailand) Adisak Klinkosoom	0	0	0	0	0	0	0	0	0	0	0	0	0	0
38	MF	(Thailand) Thitipan Puangchan	0	0	0	0	0	0	0	0	0	0	0	0	0	0
39	DF	(Thailand) Chatchai Tubteb	0	0	0	0	0	0	0	0	0	0	0	0	0	0
—	MF	(Ivory Coast) Yaya Soumahoro	0	0	0	0	0	0	0	0	0	0	0	0	0	0
—	MF	(Guinea) Sylla Moussa	0	0	0	0	0	0	0	0	0	0	0	0	0	0
—	FW	(Turkey) Berkant Göktan	0	0	0	0	0	0	0	0	0	0	0	0	0	0
—	FW	(Thailand) Chananan Pombuppha	0	0	0	0	0	0	0	0	0	0	0	0	0	0
—	—	Own goals	–	–	–	–	–	–	–	–	–	–	–	–	–	–

== Transfers ==
=== In ===
Date	Pos.	Name	From
2010	MF	(Thailand) Amorn Thammanarm	(Thailand) Pattaya United
2010	MF	(Thailand) Jakkaphan Kaewprom	(Thailand) BEC Tero Sasana
2010	DF	(Thailand) Paitoon Nontadee	(Thailand) Chula United
2010	FW	(Ivory Coast) Christian Kouakou	(Belgium) Anderlecht
2010	DF	(Thailand) Panupong Wongsa	(Thailand) Buriram PEA
2010	MF	(Thailand) Piyapol Bantao	(Thailand) Chonburi
2010	MF	(Thailand) Naruphol Ar-romsawa	(Singapore) Home United
2010	MF	(Japan) Nobuyuki Zaizen	(Japan) Montedio Yamagata
2010	FW	(Ivory Coast) Mohamed Koné	(Thailand) Chonburi
2010	MF	(Thailand) Datsakorn Thonglao	(Vietnam) Hoàng Anh Gia Lai
2010	GK	(Thailand) Theerawat Pinpradub	(Thailand) TOT-CAT
2010	FW	(Turkey) Berkant Göktan	(Germany) TSV 1860 München
2010	MF	(Thailand) Narongchai Vachiraban	(Thailand) Police United
2010	MF	(Thailand) Kittipol Paphunga	(Thailand) BEC Tero Sasana
2010	MF	(Ivory Coast) Abdoul Coulibaly	Free agent
2010	FW	(Ivory Coast) Ibrahim Kanouté	Free agent

=== Out ===
Date	Pos.	Name	From
2010	MF	(Thailand) Tanapat Na Tarue	(Thailand) Police United
2010	MF	(Thailand) Hatthaporn Suwan	(Thailand) BEC Tero Sasana
2010	MF	(Thailand) Salahudin Arware	(Thailand) Buriram PEA
2010	GK	(Thailand) Ukrit Wongmeema	(Thailand) Buriram PEA
2010	DF	(Thailand) Mika Chunuonsee	(Thailand) Suvarnabhumi Customs
2010	MF	(Thailand) Kumpee Pintakul	(Thailand) Suphanburi
2010	MF	(Ivory Coast) Yaya Soumahoro	(Belgium) Gent
2010	MF	(Guinea) Sylla Moussa	(Thailand) Bangkok Glass
2010	FW	(Turkey) Berkant Göktan	Released
2010	FW	(Thailand) Chananan Pombuppha	(Thailand) Police United

=== Loan in ===
Date	Pos.	Name	To
2009	FW	(Thailand) Teeratep Winothai	(Belgium) Lierse

=== Loan out ===
Date	Pos.	Name	To
2010	FW	(Ivory Coast) Adama Koné	(Thailand) TTM Phichit
2010	MF	(Ivory Coast) Brou Clement	(Thailand) TTM Phichit
2010	FW	(Thailand) Anusorn Srichaluang	(Thailand) TTM Phichit
