= List of Muangthong United F.C. players =

Below is a list of notable footballers who have played for Muangthong United.

== List of players ==
| Name | Nationality | Position | Muangthong career | Appearances | Goals |
|---|---|---|---|---|---|
| Adnan Barakat | Netherlands; Morocco | LW | 2012-2013 | | |
| Amorn Thammanarm | Thailand | W | 2010 | 33 | 2 |
| Anon Sangsanoi | Thailand | ST | 2011-2012 | 8 | 3 |
| Arian Jean Akassou | Ivory Coast | DF | 2006-2007 | | |
| Berkant Göktan | Germany; Turkey | FW | 2010 | | |
| Chainarong Tathong | Thailand | ST | 2012-2016 | 8 | 2 |
| Chatchai Narkwijit | Thailand | ST | 2007-2008 | | |
| Christian Kouakou | Ivory Coast | FW | 2010-2012 | 53 | 22 |
| Claudio Ramiadamanana | Madagascar | ST | 2008 | 16 | 11 |
| Diarra Ali | Ivory Coast | MF | 2011-2013 | 18 | 4 |
| Edivaldo Hermoza | Bolivia | ST | 2012 | 2 | 0 |
| Jacques Tioye | Ivory Coast | ST | 2008 | 14 | 7 |
| Jakkraphan Kaewprom | Thailand | MF | 2010–2011 | 35 | 4 |
| Jetsada Jitsawad | Thailand | DF | 2009–2010 | 57 | 0 |
| Kabfah Boonmatoon | Thailand | MF | 2011 | | |
| Kittipol Paphunga | Thailand | AM | 2010 | | |
| Mika Chunuonsee | Thailand | RB | 2009 | 9 | 0 |
| Miroslav Tóth | Slovakia | FW | 2011 | 3 | 2 |
| Mohamed Koné | Ivory Coast | ST | 2010-2011, 2012 | 31 | 18 |
| Narongchai Vachiraban | Thailand | AM | 2010 | 8 | 1 |
| Naruphol Ar-Romsawa | Thailand | MF | 2010-2011 | | |
| Nattaporn Phanrit | Thailand | CB | 2009-2012 | 90 | 9 |
| Nobuyuki Zaizen | Japan | MF | 2010 | 11 | 0 |
| Nontapan Jeansatawong | Thailand | LB | 2011 | 9 | 1 |
| Paitoon Tiepma | Thailand | RB | 2011 | | |
| Paulo Rangel | Brazil | ST | 2012-2013 | 24 | 12 |
| Payungsak Pannarat | Thailand | DF | 2008 | | |
| Pichet In-bang | Thailand | FW | 2008-2009 | 6 | 1 |
| Piyachart Tamaphan | Thailand | LB | 2009-2010, 2012 | 70 | 3 |
| Polawat Wangkahart | Thailand | RB | 2011 | | |
| Prakasit Sansook | Thailand | RB | 2009-2011 | 55 | 0 |
| Prakit Deeporm | Thailand | MF | 2007 | | |
| Ri Myong-Jun | North Korea | ST | 2012- | | |
| Robbie Fowler | England | ST | 2011-2012 | 13 | 2 |
| Roland Linz | Austria | ST | 2013 | | |
| Romone Rose | England | W | 2011 | 1 | 0 |
| Ronnachai Rangsiyo | Thailand | ST | 2009-2010 | 21 | 7 |
| Salahudin Arware | Thailand | RW | 2007–2009 | 59 | 5 |
| Samuel P.Cunningham | Thailand | GK | 2007–2008 | 17 | 0 |
| Santi Chaiyaphuak | Thailand | LW | 2011 | | |
| Sarach Yooyen | Thailand | MF | 2012-2020 | 162 | 9 |
| Surapong Thammawongsa | Thailand | MF | 2006-2008 | 44 | 13 |
| Suriya Domtaisong | Thailand | ST | 2009 | 11 | 2 |
| Sylla Moussa | Guinea | CM | 2010-2012 | 46 | 1 |
| Teerasil Dangda | Thailand | FW | 2007, 2009-2019 | 140 | 67 |
| Teeratep Winothai | Thailand | FW | 2009-2010 | 23 | 4 |
| Tehwa Sritammanusarn | Thailand | MF | 2008 | | |
| Thanongsak Panpipat | Thailand | GK | 2009–2010 | 8 | 0 |
| Todsapol Lated | Thailand | DF | 2011–2015 | 54 | 6 |
| Toni Kallio | Finland | LB | 2011 | 1 | 0 |
| Valéry Sanou | Burkina Faso | MF | 2009 | 10 | 4 |
| Weera Koedpudsa | Thailand | GK | 2011, 2013 | 6 | 0 |
| Wisarut Pannasri | Thailand | RW | 2009 | 20 | 3 |
| Witsanusak Kaewruang | Thailand | GK | 2011, 2013 | | |
| Yaya Soumahoro | Ivory Coast | W | 2008-2010 | 72 | 37 |
| Zesh Rehman | Pakistan | CB | 2011-2012 | 30 | 1 |
| Đặng Văn Lâm | Vietnam | GK | 2019-2021 | 42 | 0 |

== Key to positions ==
| GK | Goalkeeper | RB | Right back | RW | Right winger | DF | Defender |
| IF | Inside Forward | LB | Left back | LW | Left winger | CB | Centre Back |
| FW | Forward | FB | Fullback | W | Winger | MF | Midfielder |
| ST | Striker | HB | Half back | AM | Attacking Midfielder | CM | Central Midfielder |
