= 2012 King's Cup squads =

Football tournament squads

The 2012 King's Cup is an international football tournament that was held in Thailand from 15 to 21 January 2012. The 4 national teams involved in the tournament were required to register a squad of 25 players. Only players in these squads were eligible to take part in the tournament.

== Squads ==
=== Denmark League XI ===
Head coach: Morten Olsen

No.	Pos.	Player	Date of birth (age)	Caps	Club
1	GK	Jesper Hansen	30 September 1985 (aged 26)	0	(Denmark) FC Nordsjælland
3	DF	Andreas Bjelland	11 July 1988 (aged 23)	4	(Denmark) FC Nordsjælland
4	MF	Søren Christensen	29 June 1986 (aged 25)	0	(Denmark) FC Nordsjælland
5	FW	Simon Makienok	21 November 1990 (aged 21)	0	(Denmark) HB Køge
6	MF	Dennis Flinta	14 November 1983 (aged 28)	0	(Denmark) Silkeborg IF
7	MF	Mads Albæk	14 January 1990 (aged 22)	0	(Denmark) FC Midtjylland
8	FW	Nicklas Helenius	8 May 1991 (aged 20)	0	(Denmark) AaB
10	DF	Jesper Juelsgård Kristensen	26 January 1989 (aged 22)	0	(Denmark) FC Midtjylland
11	FW	Emil Larsen	22 June 1991 (aged 20)	0	(Denmark) Lyngby BK
12	MF	Kasper Lorentzen	19 November 1985 (aged 26)	0	(Denmark) Randers FC
13	FW	Tobias Mikkelsen	18 September 1986 (aged 25)	1	(Denmark) FC Nordsjælland
14	DF	Patrick Mtiliga	28 January 1981 (aged 30)	5	(Denmark) FC Nordsjælland
15	DF	Lasse Nielsen	8 January 1988 (aged 24)	0	(Denmark) AaB
16	GK	Jonas Lössl	1 February 1989 (aged 22)	0	(Denmark) FC Midtjylland
17	MF	Martin Ørnskov Nielsen	10 October 1985 (aged 26)	3	(Denmark) Silkeborg IF
18	DF	Jores Okore	11 August 1992 (aged 19)	2	(Denmark) FC Nordsjælland
19	MF	Jakob Poulsen	7 July 1983 (aged 28)	18	(Denmark) FC Midtjylland
20	DF	Peter Nymann	22 August 1982 (aged 29)	1	(Sweden) Djurgårdens IF
21	MF	Lucas Andersen	13 September 1994 (aged 17)	0	(Denmark) AaB
22	MF	Lasse Rise	9 June 1986 (aged 25)	0	(Denmark) Randers FC
23	MF	Martin Spelmann	21 March 1987 (aged 24)	0	(Denmark) AC Horsens

=== Norway ===
Head coach: Egil Olsen

No.	Pos.	Player	Date of birth (age)	Caps	Club
1	GK	Rune Jarstein	29 September 1984 (aged 27)	17	(Norway) Viking
2	DF	Vegar Eggen Hedenstad	26 June 1991 (aged 20)	0	(Norway) Stabæk
3	DF	Even Hovland	14 February 1989 (aged 22)	0	(Norway) Molde
4	MF	Thomas Drage	20 February 1992 (aged 19)	0	(Norway) Tromsø
5	DF	Vegard Forren	16 February 1988 (aged 23)	0	(Norway) Molde
6	MF	Markus Henriksen	25 July 1992 (aged 19)	2	(Norway) Rosenborg
7	MF	Magnus Wolff Eikrem	8 August 1990 (aged 21)	0	(Norway) Molde
8	MF	Simen Brenne	17 March 1981 (aged 30)	12	(Norway) Odd Grenland
9	FW	Mostafa Abdellaoue	1 August 1988 (aged 23)	0	(Norway) Vålerenga
10	FW	Tarik Elyounoussi	23 February 1988 (aged 23)	4	(Norway) Fredrikstad
11	FW	Jo Inge Berget	11 September 1990 (aged 21)	0	(Norway) Molde
12	GK	Espen Bugge Pettersen	10 May 1980 (aged 31)	3	(Norway) Molde
13	DF	Espen Ruud	26 February 1984 (aged 27)	15	(Denmark) OB
14	DF	Tore Reginiussen	10 April 1986 (aged 25)	8	(Denmark) OB
15	MF	Valon Berisha	7 February 1993 (aged 18)	0	(Norway) Viking
16	DF	Steffen Hagen	8 March 1986 (aged 25)	0	(Norway) Odd Grenland
17	FW	Thomas Sørum	17 November 1982 (aged 29)	0	(Sweden) Helsingborg
18	MF	Harmeet Singh	12 November 1990 (aged 21)	0	(Norway) Vålerenga
19	MF	Ruben Yttergård Jenssen	4 May 1988 (aged 23)	10	(Norway) Tromsø
20	FW	Alexander Søderlund	3 August 1987 (aged 24)	0	(Norway) Haugesund
21	DF	Lars Christopher Vilsvik	18 October 1988 (aged 23)	0	(Norway) Strømsgodset
22	MF	Magnus Lekven	13 January 1988 (aged 24)	0	(Norway) Odd Grenland

=== South Korea U-23 ===
Head coach: Hong Myung-bo

No.	Pos.	Player	Date of birth (age)	Caps	Club
1	GK	Kim Seung-gyu	30 September 1990 (aged 21)	7	(South Korea) Ulsan Hyundai
2	DF	Jeong Dong-ho	7 March 1990 (aged 21)	3	(Japan) Gainare Tottori
3	DF	Hwang Do-yeon	27 February 1991 (aged 20)	3	(South Korea) Daejeon Citizen
4	DF	Kim Ki-hee	13 July 1989 (aged 22)	0	(South Korea) Daegu FC
5	DF	Jang Hyun-soo	28 September 1991 (aged 20)	4	(Japan) FC Tokyo
6	DF	Yun Suk-young	13 February 1990 (aged 21)	13	(South Korea) Chunnam Dragons
7	FW	Kim Min-woo	25 February 1990 (aged 21)	8	(Japan) Sagan Tosu
8	MF	Jung Woo-young	14 December 1989 (aged 22)	5	(Japan) Kyoto Sanga FC
9	MF	Park Jong-woo	10 March 1989 (aged 22)	2	(South Korea) Busan I'Park
10	MF	Han Kook-young	19 April 1990 (aged 21)	3	(Japan) Shonan Bellmare
11	MF	Seo Jung-jin	6 September 1989 (aged 22)	9	(South Korea) Jeonbuk Hyundai Motors
12	DF	Oh Jae-suk (captain)	4 January 1990 (aged 22)	11	(South Korea) Gangwon FC
13	MF	Cho Young-cheol	31 May 1989 (aged 22)	13	(Japan) Albirex Niigata
14	FW	Kim Dong-sub	29 March 1989 (aged 22)	6	(South Korea) Gwangju FC
15	FW	Kim Hyun-sung	27 September 1989 (aged 22)	3	(South Korea) Daegu FC
16	MF	Baek Sung-dong	13 August 1991 (aged 20)	4	(South Korea) Yonsei University
17	MF	Yoon Bit-garam	7 May 1990 (aged 21)	10	(South Korea) Gyeongnam FC
18	GK	Lee Beom-Young	2 April 1989 (aged 22)	6	(South Korea) Busan I'Park
19	MF	Kim Bo-kyung	6 October 1989 (aged 22)	11	(Japan) Cerezo Osaka
20	DF	Hong Jeong-ho	12 August 1989 (aged 22)	11	(South Korea) Jeju United
21	GK	Ha Kang-jin	30 January 1989 (aged 22)	4	(South Korea) Seongnam Ilhwa Chunma
22	DF	Kim Young-Kwon	27 February 1990 (aged 21)	10	(Japan) Omiya Ardija
23	MF	Yoon Il-Rok	27 March 1992 (aged 19)	2	(South Korea) Gyeongnam FC
24	MF	Kim Tae-hwan	24 July 1989 (aged 22)	6	(South Korea) FC Seoul
25	MF	Park Yong-ji	9 October 1992 (aged 19)	1	(South Korea) Chung-Ang University

=== Thailand ===
Head coach: (Germany) Winfried Schäfer

No.	Pos.	Player	Date of birth (age)	Caps	Club
1	GK	Sivaruck Tedsungnoen	20 April 1984 (aged 27)	7	(Thailand) Buriram PEA
2	DF	Niweat Siriwong	18 July 1977 (aged 34)	99	(Thailand) Pattaya United
3	DF	Piyachart Tamaphan	5 May 1986 (aged 25)	2	(Thailand) BEC Tero Sasana
4	DF	Cholratit Jantakam	2 June 1985 (aged 26)	27	(Thailand) Chonburi
5	DF	Tanasak Srisai	25 September 1989 (aged 22)	0	(Thailand) TOT S.C.
6	DF	Nataporn Phanrit (captain)	11 January 1982 (aged 30)	64	(Thailand) Muangthong United
7	MF	Sumanya Purisai	5 December 1986 (aged 25)	0	(Thailand) Buriram F.C.
8	MF	Ekaphan Inthasen	23 September 1983 (aged 28)	4	(Thailand) Chonburi
9	FW	Surachart Sareepim	24 May 1986 (aged 25)	2	(Thailand) Insee Police United
10	FW	Teerasil Dangda	6 June 1988 (aged 23)	42	(Thailand) Muangthong United
11	FW	Chatree Chimtalay	14 December 1983 (aged 28)	1	(Thailand) Bangkok Glass
12	FW	Sarawut Masuk	3 June 1990 (aged 21)	9	(Thailand) Buriram FC
13	FW	Kirati Keawsombut	12 January 1987 (aged 25)	13	(Thailand) Buriram PEA
14	FW	Teeratep Winothai	16 February 1985 (aged 26)	46	(Thailand) BEC Tero Sasana
15	MF	Surat Sukha	27 July 1982 (aged 29)	21	(Thailand) Buriram PEA
16	MF	Phichitphong Choeichiu	28 August 1982 (aged 29)	56	(Thailand) Muangthong United
17	DF	Supachai Komsilp	18 February 1980 (aged 31)	7	(Thailand) Bangkok Glass
18	GK	Sinthaweechai Hathairattanakool	23 March 1982 (aged 29)	65	(Thailand) Chonburi
19	DF	Suree Sukha	27 July 1982 (aged 29)	61	(Thailand) Chonburi
20	MF	Jakkraphan Kaewprom	24 May 1988 (aged 23)	9	(Thailand) Buriram PEA
21	DF	Apichet Puttan	10 August 1979 (aged 32)	6	(Thailand) Buriram PEA
22	MF	Adisak Klinkosoom	18 August 1992 (aged 19)	0	(Thailand) Muangthong United
23	MF	Jirawat Makarom	7 February 1986 (aged 25)	0	(Thailand) Buriram F.C.
24	FW	Anon Sangsanoi	1 March 1984 (aged 27)	9	(Thailand) Muangthong United
25	FW	Chanathip Songkrasin	5 October 1993 (aged 18)	6	(Thailand) BEC Tero Sasana
26	GK	Kawin Thammasatchanan	26 January 1990 (aged 21)	12	(Thailand) Muangthong United
27	DF	Jetsada Jitsawad	5 August 1980 (aged 31)	29	(Thailand) BEC Tero Sasana
