= 2011 Muangthong United F.C. season =

Muangthong United
2011 season
- Chairman: Pongsak Phol-Anan
- Head Coach: Robbie Fowler
- Thai Premier League: 3rd
- AFC Champions League: Playoff stage
- AFC Cup: Quarter-finals
- FA Cup: Runner-up
- League Cup: Quarter-finals
- Kor Royal Cup: Runner-up
- Top goalscorer: Teerasil Dangda (13)
Home colours	Away colours	Third colours

The 2011 season was Muangthong United's third season in the top division of Thai football. Muangthong finished 3rd in the Premier League and reached the play-off stage of the AFC Champions League, putting them into the AFC Cup where they reached the quarter-finals.

== Competitions ==
=== Champions League ===
12 February 2011	Sriwijaya (Indonesia)	2 – 2 (a.e.t.) (7 – 6 p)	(Thailand) Muangthong United	Jakabaring Stadium, Palembang
15:30 UTC+07:00	Gumbs 49'; Gathuessi 112'	Report	Datsakorn 82'; Teerasil 93'	Attendance: 12,000; Referee: Malik Abdul Bashir (Singapore)
	Penalties
	Gumbs (penalty scored); Astaman (penalty scored); Sudarsono (penalty scored); Lasut (penalty scored); Diano (penalty missed); Gathuessi (penalty missed); Panggabean (penalty scored); Nasir (penalty scored); Jufriyanto (penalty scored)		(penalty scored) Datsakorn; (penalty scored) Jakkraphan P. (penalty scored) Anon S. (penalty scored) Naruphol; (penalty missed) Dagno; (penalty missed) Kouakou; (penalty scored) Teerasil; (penalty scored) Nattaporn; (penalty missed) Weerawut

=== AFC Cup ===
Group G	Pld	W	D	L	GF	GA	GD	Pts
(Thailand) Muangthong United	6	4	2	0	14	1	+13	14
(Singapore) Tampines Rovers	6	3	2	1	12	8	+4	11
(Vietnam) Ha Noi T&T	6	2	2	2	5	8	−3	8
(Maldives) Victory	6	0	0	6	1	15	−14	0

2 March 2011 Group stage	Muangthong United (Thailand)	4 – 0	(Vietnam) Ha Noi T&T	Thunderdome Stadium, Nonthaburi
19:30 UTC+07:00	Teerasil 21', 90+1'; Kouakou 54'; Anon 59'	Report		Attendance: 9,000; Referee: Ng Kai Lam (Hong Kong)

16 March 2011 Group stage	Tampines Rovers (Singapore)	1 – 1	(Thailand) Muangthong United	Jalan Besar Stadium, Singapore
19:30 UTC+08:00	Durić 23'	Report	Pichitphong 31'	Attendance: 1,975; Referee: Yadollah Jahanbazi (Iran)

12 April 2011 Group stage	Muangthong United (Thailand)	1 – 0	(Maldives) Victory	Thunderdome Stadium, Nonthaburi
19:30 UTC+07:00	Siaka 90+1'	Report		Attendance: 6,290; Referee: Mohd Nafeez Abdul Wahab (Malaysia)

27 April 2011 Group stage	Victory (Maldives)	0 – 4	(Thailand) Muangthong United	National Stadium, Male
16:10 UTC+05:00		Report	Kouakou 8', 45+4'; Naruphol 22'; Kabfah 68'	Attendance: 3,000; Referee: Hettikamkanamge Perera (Sri Lanka)

3 May 2011 Group stage	Ha Noi T&T (Vietnam)	0 – 0	(Thailand) Muangthong United	Hàng Đẫy Stadium, Hanoi
16:00 UTC+07:00		Report		Attendance: 2,000; Referee: Yu Ming-hsun (Chinese Taipei)

10 May 2011 Group stage	Muangthong United (Thailand)	4 – 0	(Singapore) Tampines Rovers	Thunderdome Stadium, Nonthaburi
19:30 UTC+07:00	Kouakou 51'; Anon 60', 85'; Jakkraphan 72'	Report		Attendance: 7,346; Referee: Yousef Al-Marzouq (Kuwait)

24 May 2011 Round of 16	Muangthong United (Thailand)	4 – 0	(Lebanon) Al-Ahed	Thunderdome Stadium, Nonthaburi
19:30 UTC+07:00	Teerasil 50'; Naruphol 52'; Kouakou 61'; Datsakorn 76'	Report		Attendance: 9,500; Referee: Peter Green (Australia)

13 September 2011 Quarter-finals	Al-Kuwait	1 – 0	(Thailand) Muangthong United	Al Kuwait Sports Club Stadium, Kuwait City
18:30 UTC+03:00	Rogerinho 76'	Report		Attendance: 4,000; Referee: Valentin Kovalenko (Uzbekistan)

27 September 2011 Quarter-finals	Muangthong United (Thailand)	0 – 0	Al-Kuwait	Thunderdome Stadium, Nonthaburi
19:30 UTC+07:00		Report		Attendance: 11,212; Referee: Choi Myung-Yong (Korea Republic)
