= 2010 Kor Royal Cup =

Muangthong United	Thai Port
2	0
- Thai Port forfeited due to crowd riots
- Date: 20 February 2010
- Venue: Suphachalasai Stadium, Bangkok
- Referee: Atthakorn Wetchakan

The 2010 Kor Royal Cup was the 75th Kor Royal Cup, an annual football match contested by the winners of the previous season's Thai Premier League and Thai FA Cup competitions. The match was played at Suphachalasai Stadium, Bangkok, on 20 February 2010, and contested by 2009 Thai Premier League champions Muangthong United, and Thai Port as the winners of the 2009 Thai FA Cup.

== Match ==
=== Summary ===
==== First half ====
Koné Mohamed made the goal with a header from Piyachart Tamaphan's right corner in 14th minute but it was not given because it was foul. In 16th minute Soumahoro Yaya made the goal too but it was offside.

==== Second half ====
Koné scored with a header from Piyachart's free kick in 67th minute, this is the first goal of Koné under Muangthong United shirt after moved from Chonburi. In 81st minute Dagno Siaka scored with a header.

==== The stampede ====
After Muangthong United scored the second goal, Thai Port's Pongpipat Kamnuan attempted to convince his fans that the last goal came from a handball, which angered Thai Port fans (the Khlong Toei Army).

Thai Port fans agreed with him, and feeling that the second goal should have been disallowed, they started throwing firecrackers and bottles onto the pitch; a pitch invasion then occurred and angry Thai Port fans attacked fleeing Muangthong United fans (the Ultra Muangthong), Muangthong United players, officials and stadium security.

=== Details ===
20 February 2010
17:00 UTC+7

Muangthong United	2–0	Thai Port
Koné 67'; Siaka 81'	Report

Suphachalasai Stadium, Bangkok
Attendance: 13,000
Referee: Atthakorn Wetchakan

Muangthong United	Thai Port

MUANGTHONG UNITED:
GK	26	(Thailand) Kawin Thammasatchanan
DF	3	(Thailand) Prakasit Sansook
DF	4	(Thailand) Panupong Wongsa
DF	6	(Thailand) Nattaporn Phanrit (c)
DF	11	(Thailand) Piyachart Tamaphan
MF	7	(Thailand) Datsakorn Thonglao		(substituted off) 45'
MF	15	(Guinea) Moussa Sylla
MF	21	(Ivory Coast) Dagno Siaka	(yellow card) 66'
MF	24	(Ivory Coast) Soumahoro Yaya	(yellow card) 52'
FW	22	(Ivory Coast) Koné Mohamed
FW	14	(Thailand) Teeratep Winothai		(substituted off) 45'
Substitutes:
MF	20	(Thailand) Amorn Thammanarm		(substituted in) 45'
FW	13	(Ivory Coast) Cristian Kouakou		(substituted in) 45'
Manager:
(Belgium) René Desaeyere

THAI PORT:
GK	39	(Cameroon) Munze Ulrich
DF	22	(Brazil) Mario Da Silva
DF	26	(Thailand) Alef Poh-ji	(yellow card) 9'
DF	36	(Cameroon) Moudourou Moise
DF	17	(Thailand) Pongpipat Kamnuan
MF	4	(Thailand) Worawut Wangsawad	(yellow card) 44'	(substituted off) 60'
MF	6	(Thailand) Rangsan Iam-Wiroj	(yellow card) 22'
MF	11	(Thailand) Jirawat Makarom
MF	11	(Thailand) Kiatjarern Ruangparn
FW	27	(Thailand) Sarayoot Chaikamdee (c)
FW	24	(Thailand) Sompong Soleb
Substitutes:
MF	16	(Thailand) Ekachai Preechakool		(substituted in) 60'
Manager:
(Thailand) Sasom Pobprasert

Assistant referees:
Preecha Kangram
Wirote On-koke
Fourth official:
Mongkolchai Pradsri

MATCH RULES

- 90 minutes.
- Penalty shoot-out if necessary.
- Maximum of three substitutions.

== See also ==
- 2009 Thai Premier League
- 2009 Thai FA Cup
