= 2017 Thai FA Cup final =

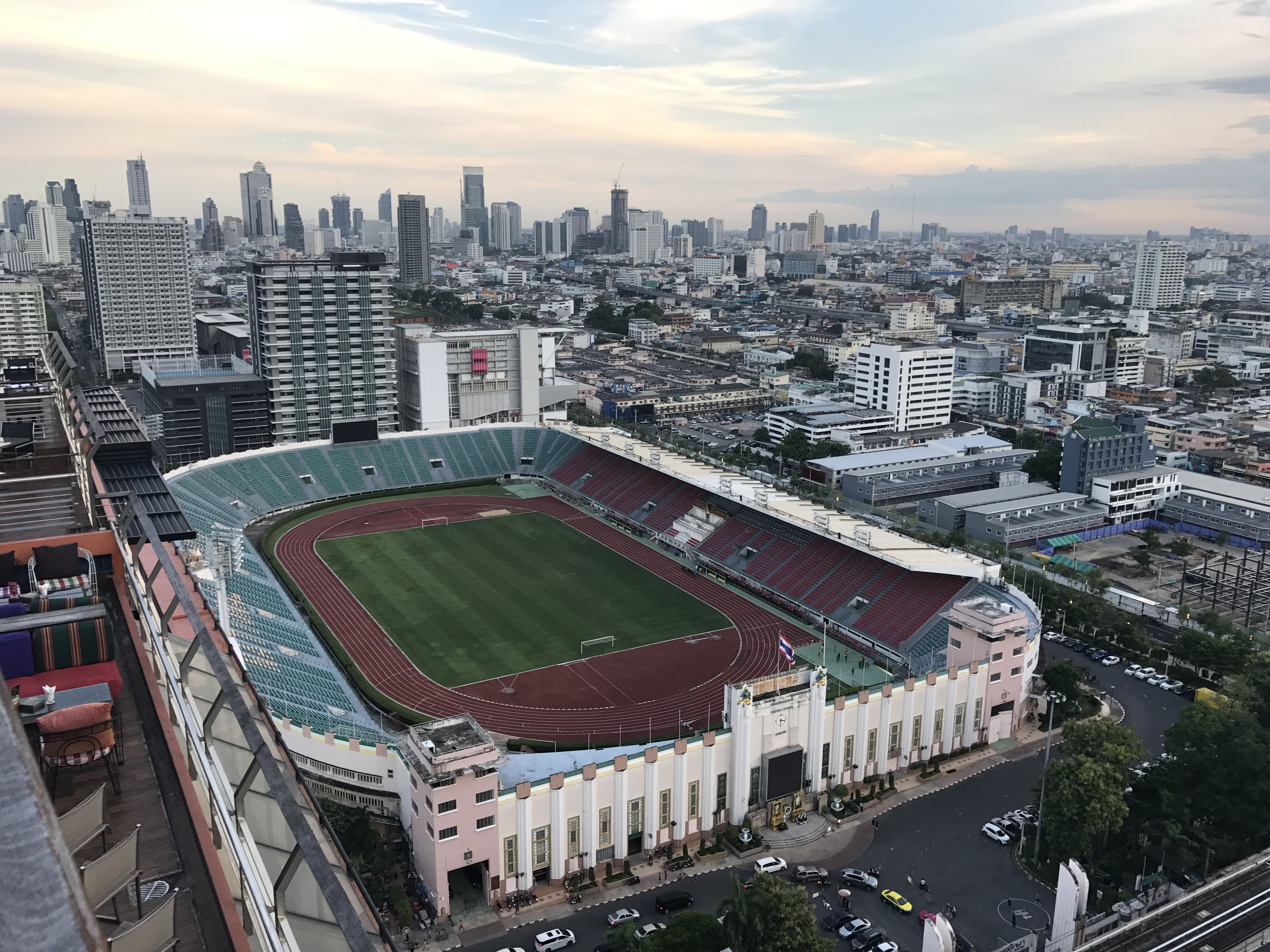
- The match took place at Supachalasai Stadium.
- Event: 2017 Thai FA Cup
Chiangrai United	Bangkok United
4	2
- Date: 25 November 2017
- Venue: Supachalasai Stadium, Bangkok
- Man of the Match: Everton Gonçalves
- Referee: Songkran Bunmeekiat (Thailand)
- Attendance: 16,562
- Weather: clear 28 °C (82 °F) humidity 65%

The 2017 Thai FA Cup final was the final match of the 2017 Thai FA Cup, the 24th season of a Thailand's football tournament organised by Football Association of Thailand. It was played at the Supachalasai Stadium in Bangkok, Thailand on 25 November 2017, between Chiangrai United a big team from the Northern part of Thailand and Bangkok United a big team from the metropolitan region.

== Road to the final ==
In their semi-finals, Chiangrai United beat SCG Muangthong United on Penalty shoot-out 4–3 after extra time 120 minutes of 2–2 . In the same way, Bangkok United beat JL Chiangmai United 3–0 and qualified to the final.

Chiangrai United (T1)		Round	Bangkok United (T1)	
Opponent	Result	Knockout 1 leg	Opponent	Result
BTU United (T4)	9–0 (H)	Round of 64	Chiangrai City (T4)	5–1 (A)
Sukhothai (T1)	1–0 (A)	Round of 32	Nakhon Ratchasima Mazda (T1)	3–0 (H)
BEC Tero Sasana (T1)	3–1 (a.e.t.) (H)	Round of 16	Port (T1)	5–1 (H)
Buriram United (T1)	1–0 (H)	Quarter-finals	Suphanburi (T1)	1–0 (a.e.t.) (A)
SCG Muangthong United (T1)	2–2 (a.e.t.) (4–3p) (N)	Semi-finals	JL Chiangmai United (T4)	3–0 (N)

Note: In all results below, the score of the finalist is given first (H: home; A: away; T1: Clubs from Thai League; T2: Clubs from Thai League 2; T4: Clubs from Thai League 4).

== Match ==
=== Details ===
25 November 2017
19:00 UTC+7

Chiangrai United	4–2	Bangkok United
Everton 25'; Rafael Coelho 58'; Vander 81', 90+3' (pen.)	Report; Highlight	Pokklaw 6'; Jaycee 74'

Supachalasai Stadium, Bangkok
Attendance: 16,562
Referee: Songkran Boonmeekiat (Thailand)

Chiangrai United	Bangkok United

Lineups:
GK	1	(Thailand) Chatchai Budprom
DF	4	(Thailand) Piyaphon Phanichakul (c)		(yellow card) 63'
DF	5	(Thailand) Pratum Chuthong
DF	28	(Brazil) Everton Gonçalves	25'
DF	30	(Thailand) Suriya Singmui		(yellow card) 83'
DF	36	(Thailand) Shinnaphat Lee-oh
MF	6	(Thailand) Phitiwat Sukjitthammakul
MF	8	(Thailand) Thitipan Puangchan		(yellow card) 49' (yellow-red card) 86'
MF	10	(Brazil) Vander Luiz	81', 90+3' (pen.)	(yellow card) 69'
MF	21	(Thailand) Sivakorn Tiatrakul			(substituted off) 90'
FW	11	(Brazil) Felipe Azevedo			(substituted off) 7'
Substitutes:
GK	18	(Thailand) Pattara Piyapatrakitti
GK	20	(Thailand) Nont Muangngam
DF	3	(Thailand) Krissadee Prakobkong
DF	22	(Thailand) Watcharin Nuengprakaew
MF	7	(Thailand) Chaiyawat Buran				(substituted on) 85'
MF	14	(Thailand) Pathompol Charoenrattanapirom
MF	27	(Thailand) Thanawich Kamna			(substituted on) 90'
MF	9	(Brazil) Rafael Coelho	58'		(substituted on) 7'	(substituted off) 85'
MF	16	(Thailand) Akarawin Sawasdee
Head Coach:
(Brazil) Alexandre Gama

Lineups:
GK	1	(Thailand) Kittipong Phuthawchueak
DF	5	(Thailand) Putthinan Wannasri		(yellow card) 50'	(substituted off) 67'
DF	23	(Thailand) Sathaporn Daengsee		(yellow card) 45+2' (yellow-red card) 71'
DF	40	(Thailand) Manuel Bihr
MF	2	(Thailand) Ekkachai Sumrei		(red card) 90+2'
MF	6	(Thailand) Anthony Ampaipitakwong		(yellow card) 39'	(substituted off) 83'
MF	18	(Thailand) Alexander Sieghart			(substituted off) 46'
MF	39	(Thailand) Pokklaw Anan	6'
FW	7	(Montenegro) Dragan Bošković (c)		(yellow card) 90+3'
FW	20	(North Macedonia) Mario Gjurovski
FW	22	(Bahrain) Jaycee John	74'
Substitutes:
GK	34	(Thailand) Warut Mekmusik
DF	4	(Thailand) Panupong Wongsa
DF	16	(Thailand) Mika Chunuonsee
MF	8	(Thailand) Wittaya Madlam
MF	11	(Thailand) Sumanya Purisai			(substituted on) 46'
MF	29	(Thailand) Sanrawat Dechmitr		(yellow card) 78' (yellow-red card) 89'	(substituted on) 67'
MF	37	(Thailand) Wisarut Imura
MF	77	(Thailand) Jakkapan Pornsai
FW	14	(Thailand) Teeratep Winothai			(substituted on) 83'
Head Coach:
(Brazil) Alexandré Pölking

Assistant referees:
(Thailand) Rachen Srichai
(Thailand) Chaowalit Phoonprasit
Fourth official:
(Thailand) Wiwat Jumpa-on
Match Commissioner:
(Thailand) Paiboon Anyapo
Referee Assessor:
(Thailand) Chalat Pirom

MATCH RULES

- 90 minutes.
- 30 minutes of extra-time if necessary.
- Penalty shootout if scores still level.
- Nine named substitutes.
- Maximum of three substitutions.

== Winner ==
2017 Thai FA Cup
Winners
Chiangrai United
First Title

=== Prizes for winner ===
- A champion trophy.
- 5,000,000 THB prize money.
- Qualification to 2018 AFC Champions League Preliminary round 2.
- Qualification to 2018 Thailand Champions Cup.

=== Prizes for runners-up ===
- 1,000,000 THB prize money.

== See also ==
- 2017 Thai League
- 2017 Thai League 2
- 2017 Thai League 3
- 2017 Thai League 4
- 2017 Thai FA Cup
- 2017 Thai League Cup
