= Akoupé-Zeudji =

- Village
- Location in Ivory Coast
- Coordinates: 5°29′N 4°9′W
- Country: Ivory Coast
- Districts: Abidjan
- Sub-prefecture: Anyama
- Time zone: UTC+0 (GMT)

Akoupé-Zeudji is a small village in southern Ivory Coast. It is located in the sub-prefecture of Anyama in the Autonomous District of Abidjan. Prior to 2011, it was in the Abidjan Department, Lagunes Region. It lies roughly 13 kilometres (8.1 mi) to the northwest of the city of Abidjan, just to the northeast of Attinguié.

Akoupé-Zeudji has a private school and a public school, built by the government of the Abidjan Department under the leadership of Governor Pierre Djédji Amondji, and also has a community centre, a private vocational training centre, and a nightclub. In August 2011, the FRCI attacked Akoupé Zeudji and villages in the area, burning houses, due to it being the town of Prime Minister Gilbert Aké.

Akoupé-Zeudji was a commune until March 2012, when it became one of 1,126 communes nationwide that were abolished.
