= Rangsan =

Rangsan (Thai: รังสรรค์, pronounced [rāŋ.sǎn]) is a masculine Thai given name. Notable people with the given name include:

- Rangsan Chayanram, Thai boxer
- Rangsan Iam-Wiroj (born 1982), Thai footballer
- Rangsan Roobmoh, Thai footballer
- Rangsan Torsuwan, Thai architect
- Rangsan Viwatchaichok, Thai football coach
- Rangsan Wiroonsri, Thai footballer
