= Anyama, Ivory Coast =

Anyama
- City, sub-prefecture, and commune
- Location in Ivory Coast
- Coordinates: 5°30′N 4°3′W
- Country: Ivory Coast
- District: Abidjan

Area
  - Total: 498 km^{2} (192 sq mi)

Population (2021 census)
  - Total: 389,592
  - Density: 782/km^{2} (2,030/sq mi)
  - City: 103,297
- (2014 census)
- Time zone: UTC+0 (GMT)

Anyama is a city in south-eastern Ivory Coast. It is a suburb of Abidjan and is one of four sub-prefectures of Abidjan Autonomous District. Anyama is also a commune. The city is located about 20 kilometres north of Abidjan.

Villages in the sub-prefecture include Akoupé-Zeudji, Attinguié, and M'Bonoua.

== Sport ==
Anyama is represented in football by Rio Sport d'Anyama.

== Notable people ==
- Gervinho, Ivorian international footballer
- Arouna Koné, Ivorian international footballer
- Serges Déblé, footballer
