= Nawapol Tantraseni =

Thai footballer (born 1989)

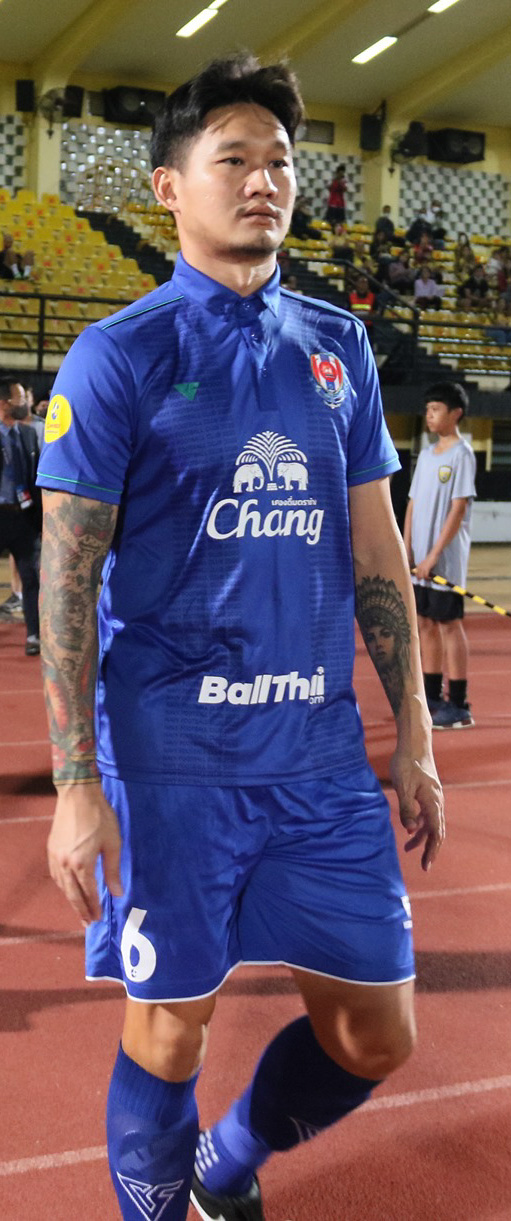
- Nawaphol Tantrasenee, 2020

Personal information
- Full name: Nawapol Tantraseni
- Date of birth: 9 March 1989 (age 37)
- Place of birth: Rayong, Thailand
- Height: 1.84 m (6 ft 1/2 in)
- Positions: Center back; defensive midfielder

Youth career
- Assumption Sriracha College

Senior career*
Years	Team	Apps	(Gls)
2007	Chonburi	?	(?)
2008	Sriracha	24	(0)
2009–2010	Muangthong United	3	(0)
2011	Police United	?	(?)
2011	Chiangmai	?	(?)
2012	Esan United	?	(?)
2012	Phuket	?	(?)
2013	Nakhon Nayok	?	(?)
2014	Phitsanulok	7	(0)
2014–2015	Saraburi	13	(0)
2016	Nakhon Pathom United	16	(2)
2017	Prachuap	19	(0)
2017–2018	Sukhothai	8	(0)
2019	Ubon United	1	(0)
2020	Ayutthaya United	7	(1)
2020–2021	Uthai Thani	24	(1)
2021–2022	Navy	3	(0)

International career
2008–2009	Thailand U19		
- * Club domestic league appearances and goals as of 17 October 2021

Nawapol Tantraseni (Thai: นวพล ตันตระเสนีย์, born March 9, 1989) is a Thai professional footballer.

== Honours ==
=== Club ===
Chonburi

- Thailand Premier League Champions (1) : 2007

Muangthong United

- Thai Premier League Champions (2) : 2009, 2010
- Kor Royal Cup winner (1) : 2010
