= Attinguié =

- Village
- Location in Côte d'Ivoire
- Coordinates: 5°28′N 4°11′W
- Country: Ivory Coast
- Districts: Abidjan
- Sub-prefecture: Anyama
- Time zone: UTC+0 (GMT)

Attinguié is a village in southern Ivory Coast. It is in the Anyama sub-prefecture in the Autonomous District of Abidjan. Prior to 2011, it was in the Abidjan Department, Lagunes Region.

Attinguié was a commune until March 2012, when it became one of 1,126 communes nationwide that were abolished.
