= M'Bonoua =

- Village
- Location in Ivory Coast
- Coordinates: 5°33′N 4°14′W
- Country: Ivory Coast
- District: Abidjan
- Sub-prefecture: Anyama
- Time zone: UTC+0 (GMT)

M'Bonoua is a village in south-eastern Ivory Coast. It is in the sub-prefecture of Anyama in the Autonomous District of Abidjan.

M'Bonoua was a commune until March 2012, when it became one of 1,126 communes nationwide that were abolished.
