= Teerasil Dangda =

Thai footballer (born 1988)

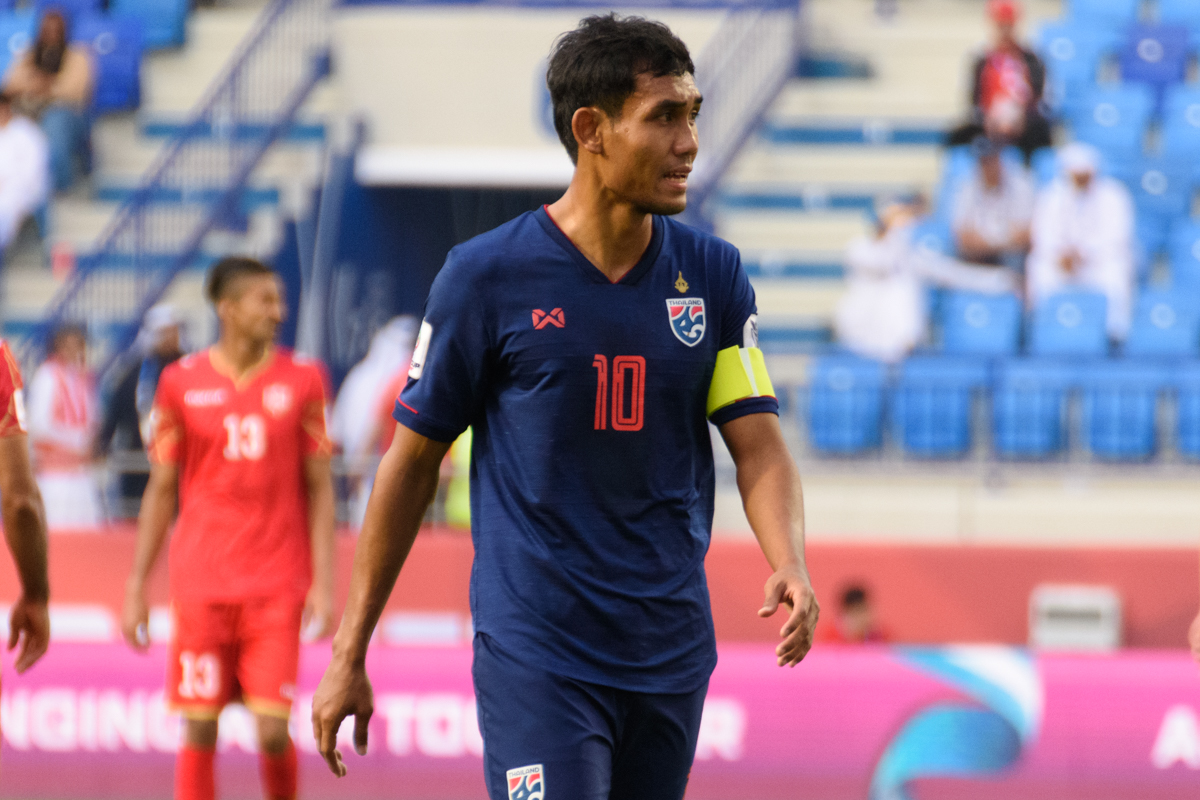
- Teerasil playing for Thailand at the 2019 AFC Asian Cup

Personal information
- Full name: Teerasil Dangda
- Date of birth: 6 June 1988 (age 38)
- Place of birth: Bangkok, Thailand
- Height: 1.81 m (5 ft 11 in)
- Position: Striker

Team information
- Current team: Bangkok United
- Number: 10

Youth career
- 2003–2005: Assumption College Thonburi

Senior career*
Years	Team	Apps	(Gls)
2005	Air Technical Training School	6	(3)
2006	Rajpracha	18	(9)
2007	Muangthong United	15	(7)
2007–2008	Manchester City	0	(0)
2008	→ Grasshopper II (loan)	6	(2)
2008	Rajpracha	10	(6)
2009–2019	Muangthong United	270	(117)
2014–2015	→ Almería (loan)	6	(0)
2018	→ Sanfrecce Hiroshima (loan)	32	(6)
2020	Shimizu S-Pulse	24	(3)
2021–2025	BG Pathum United	81	(29)
2025–	Bangkok United	24	(5)

International career^{‡}
2002–2004	Thailand U17	11	(7)
2005–2006	Thailand U19	7	(9)
2006–2010	Thailand U23	13	(3)
2007–	Thailand	130	(64)
Medal record
Thailand under-23
Sea Games
Gold medal – first place	Sea Games 2007	Football
Thailand
Asean Football Championship
Runner-up	AFF Suzuki Cup 2008	2008
Runner-up	AFF Suzuki Cup 2012	2012
Winner	AFF Suzuki Cup 2016	2016
Winner	AFF Suzuki Cup 2020	2020
Winner	AFF Mitsubishi Electric Cup 2022	2022
- * Club domestic league appearances and goals as of 01:24, 10 February 2026 (UTC) ‡ National team caps and goals as of 9 June 2026

Teerasil Dangda (Thai: ธีรศิลป์ แดงดา, pronounced [tʰīː.rā.sǐn dɛ̄ːŋ.dāː]; born 6 June 1988) is a Thai professional Footballer who plays as a Striker for Thai League 1 club Bangkok United and the Thailand national team.

Beside his country, Teerasil has played in England, Switzerland, Spain, and Japan during his professional football career.

Considered one of the greatest Southeast Asian footballers of all time, Teerasil won three AFF Championship titles with Thailand and he is also the all-time goalscorer of the tournament with 25 goals. He is currently the third-highest all-time goal scorer in the Thai League 1 and the highest local all-time goal scorer in the league with 143 goals.

== Club career ==
=== Early career ===
Teerasil started his football career playing youth football for Assumption College Thonburi in 2003, aged 15. Two years later he left the club, due to the lack of a professional team (it was only founded in 2011). In the 2004–2005 season, Teerasil joined Air Technical Training School in Thai Division 1 League In the same season he made his senior debut and scored three goals in only six matches for the club.

=== Rajpracha ===
In January 2006, Teerasil moved to Rajpracha, being an important offensive unit for the side, being the club's topscorer (nine goals in 18 games) and also assisting in further five goals during the campaign.

=== Muangthong United ===
In January 2007, Teerasil joined second division club Muangthong United, and was a part of the squad who was crowned champions winning the 2007 Thailand League Division 2 league title, contributing with seven goals and six assists.

=== Manchester City ===
On 25 July 2007, Teerasil was taken on a trial at English Premier League club Manchester City (alongside Suree Sukha and Kiatprawut Saiwaeo), after Thai businessman and former Prime Minister Thaksin Shinawatra bought City earlier in the month. After a long time waiting for their work permits, the trio signed with City on 16 November.

==== Grasshopper (loan) ====
However, after problems with the work permit, Teerasil was loaned to one of City's new alliances, Grasshopper. After returning to Manchester City in 2008, he was still unable to play in England, and after the takeover of Abu Dhabi United Group, the Thai trio was released on 16 October 2008. He later said that his time at City "made him a better footballer", despite not appearing with the first-team.

Teerasil was loaned to Grasshopper alongside Suree in November, but both failed to make a first-team appearance, only appearing with the reserves in 1. Liga Classic. He scored twice in six matches for the reserve squad and returned to City in June 2008.

=== Return to Rajpracha ===
Soon after being released by City, Teerasil returned to his homeland and re-joined Rajpracha on 16 October 2008 for the remainder of the season. He contributed with six goals in only eight games, helping the club to achieve a mid-table position during the campaign.

=== Return to Muangthong United ===
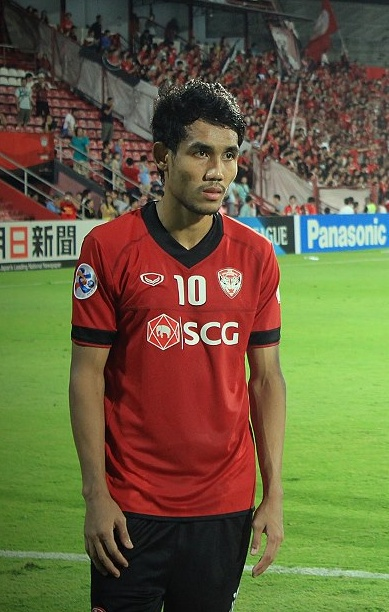
Teerasil with Muangthong United in 2013

In January 2009, Teerasil returned to Muangthong United. On 8 March 2009, he made his Thailand Premier League debut, in a 3–0 home win over Port FC, and finished 2009 season with seven goals under his belt. He helped the club to win the 2009 Thai Premier League title.

In the 2010 season, Teerasil repeated his tally of the previous season, and was a part of the squad who was crowned champions of Thailand again. In 2011 he established himself as the club's topscorer, scoring 13 goals as Muangthong finished third. Teerasil was also invited for a trial at Queens Park Rangers in July.

In the 2012 season, Muangthong engaged an unbeaten run which lasted the whole season, and Teerasil also scored four goals in a single match, an 8–1 routing over BBCU on 18 October. Ten days later he scored in a 2–2 draw against BEC Tero Sasana, a goal which granted the title, took his tally to 24 goals and broke the previous record of Ronnachai Sayomchai in 1998 (23 goals).

==== Trials at La liga club ====
After his impressive goal tally in the season, Teerasil was invited by La Liga sides Atlético Madrid and Getafe for a trial, but as the former was a Muangthong United partner, he headed to Atletico Madrid in January 2013; he also attracted interest of Turkey club Trabzonspor in June 2013.

On 9 January 2013, Teerasil travelled to Spain for a two-week trial at Atlético Madrid. He later described the Spanish football as "very quick, strong and with great quality", after completing his first training with the Madrilenians. Teerasil also watched from the stands an Atletico Madrid win over Real Zaragoza four days later, and returned to Muangthong in February.

Teerasil's first goal of the season came from a volley on 2 March 2013 in a 2–1 success against Army United. His second came late in the month, in a 3–0 home win over Songkhla United, and he scored again in the following weekend, against Ratchaburi. After seven matches without scoring, Teerasil netted again on 29 May, but in a 1–3 away loss to Suphanburi. On 23 June he netted twice against BEC Tero, and his first hat-trick of the season came on 5 October, in a 3–1 away win over Osotspa Saraburi.

Teerasil also played in the 2013 AFC Champions League group stage against Jeonbuk Hyundai Motors, Guangzhou Evergrande, and Urawa Red Diamonds. He finished the season with 16 goals in the league (21 overall).

Teerasil started 2014 season as a second striker, playing behind new signing Jay Bothroyd. He scored twice in the second game of the season, a 3–0 win at TOT, and again roughly a month later in a 4–1 success at PTT Rayong. Teerasil appeared in 18 league matches, scoring nine goals. He played his last match for Muangthong on 2 July, starting in a 0–1 League Cup loss against Buriram United. Teerasil sent a farewell to Muangthong fans after the match.

=== Almería (loan) ===
On 21 February 2014, Teerasil signed with Spanish club Almería on a one-year loan deal, making him the first Southeast Asian and Thai footballer to play in La Liga. He arrived at his new club on 9 June, being surrounded by supporters in the airport.

Teerasil made his debut in the Spanish top level on 23 August 2014, replacing Fernando Soriano in the 65th minute of a 1–1 home draw against RCD Espanyol, thus becoming the first Thai footballer to do so. He was handed his first start on 5 December, and scored his side's second of a 4–3 away win against Real Betis, for the campaign's Copa del Rey.

=== Third stint at Muangthong United ===
On 20 January 2015, after an unsuccessful spell, Teerasil returned to his parent club. He backed to be an important part for Muangthong United and won 2016 Thai League. In the next season, he scored 100th goal for his club on 11 March 2017 against Nakhon Ratchasima. Moreover, he broke Pipob On-Mo's league record of 108 goals becoming highest league goals of Thai players with 109 goals after scored twice against Super Power Samut Prakan.

==== Sanfrecce Hiroshima (loan) ====
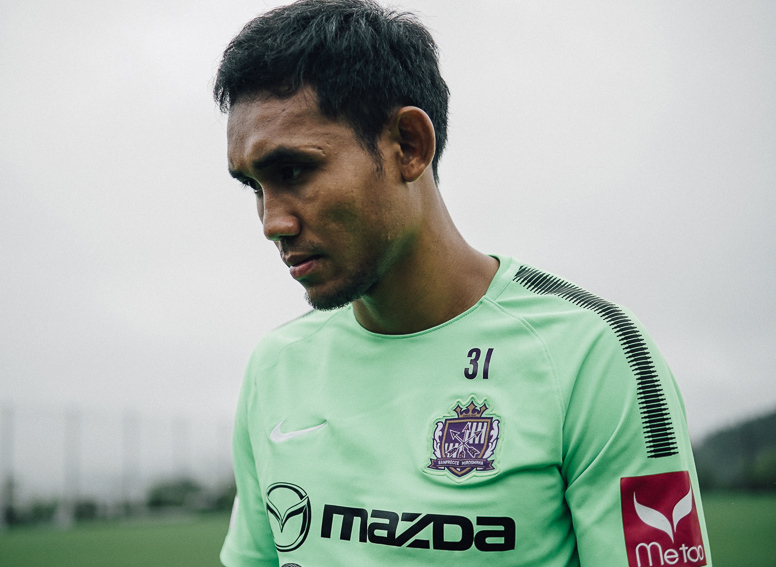
Teerasil with Sanfrecce Hiroshima in 2018

Teerasil signed for J1 League club Sanfrecce Hiroshima on 20 December 2017 on loan. He made his official debut against Consadole Sapporo on 24 February 2018, where his former teammates Chanathip Songkrasin and Jay Bothroyd also plays in the match during the 2018 J1 League and scored the winning goal for his club. He has scored 6 goals in 32 league appearances for the club. He returned to Muangthong United even though Sanfrecce want him to play in next season.

=== Shimizu S-Pulse ===
In January 2020, Teerasil signed with Shimizu S-Pulse. He made his debut on 22 February against FC Tokyo, netting a goal in a 3–1 defeat. In the 2020 J1 League, he scored 3 goals in 24 league appearances for the club.

=== BG Pathum United ===
In December 2020, Teerasil returned to the Thai League 1, signing with BG Pathum United. On his debut on 6 February 2021, Teerasil scored his first goal for BG Pathum, in their 2–0 win against Police Tero. In his first season with BG Pathum, he won the 2020–21 Thai League 1 title. On 6 August 2022, BG Pathum United in a 3–2 win over Buriram United, he won the Thailand Champions Cup 2 times in a row. On 29 May 2023, BG Pathum United announced a contract renewal with Teerasil, until the end of the 2024–25 season. On 14 June 2024, Teerasil scores the winning goal late in 90+8 stoppage time to secure the club the 2023–24 Thai League Cup over his former club Muangthong United. During the 2024–25 ASEAN Club Championship match against Cambodian club Preah Khan Reach Svay Rieng, after the opponent scored an equaliser in the 61st minute, Teerasil scored 2 minutes later to secured a 2–1 win. On 17 June 2025, BG Pathum United bid farewell to Teerasil after contract expiry.

=== Bangkok United ===
On 1 July 2025, Teerasil signed with Bangkok United and wore the number 10 jersey for the club. He make his debut for the club coming on as a substitution and scored on his debut in a match against Rayong in a 3–2 home league victory on 17 August. On 22 May 2026, Bangkok United announced a contract renewal with Teerasil, until the end of the 2026–27 season.

== International career ==
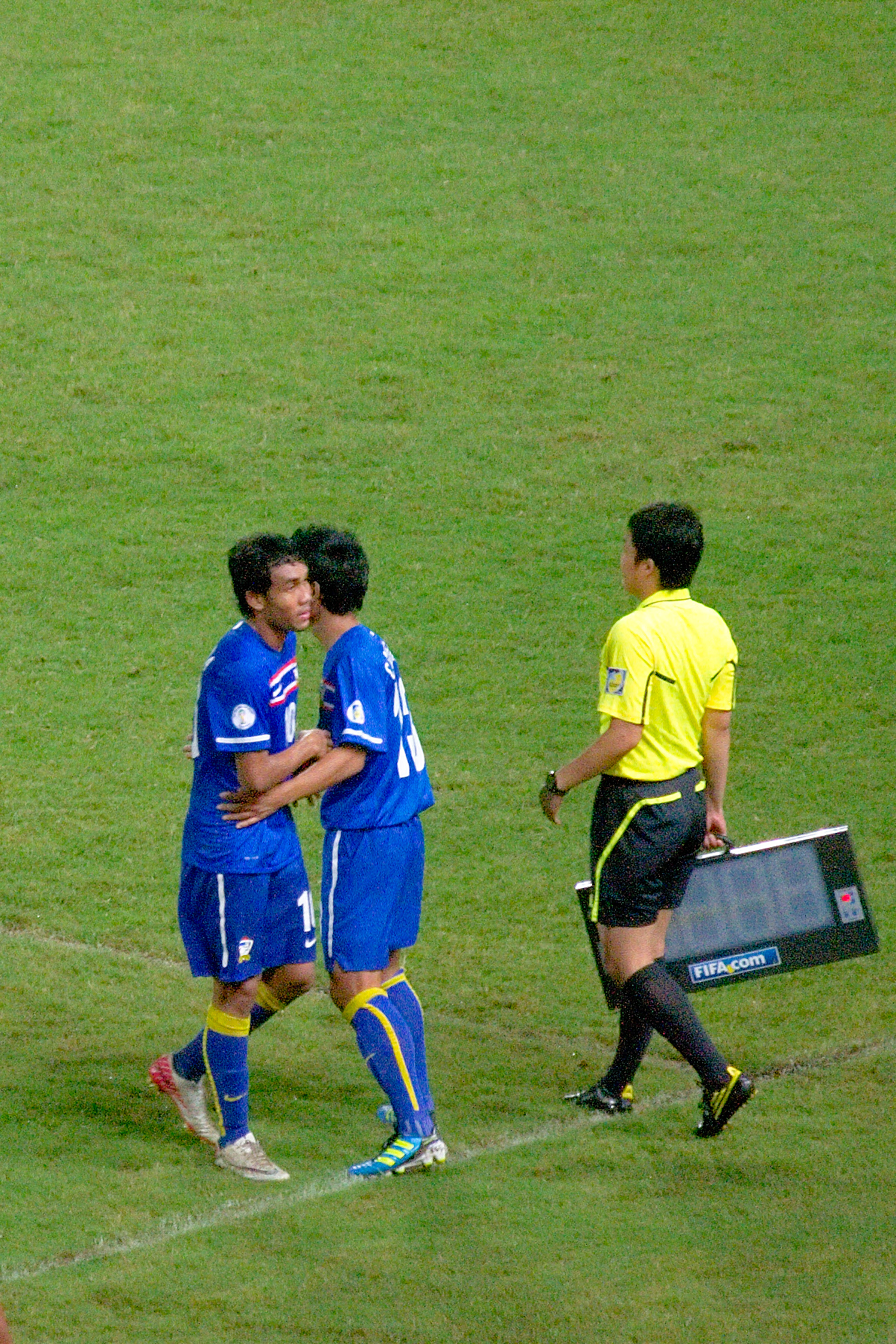
Teerasil Dangda (left) and Chatree Chimtalay during 2014 FIFA World Cup qualification – AFC third round match against Oman at Rajamangala Stadium in 2011

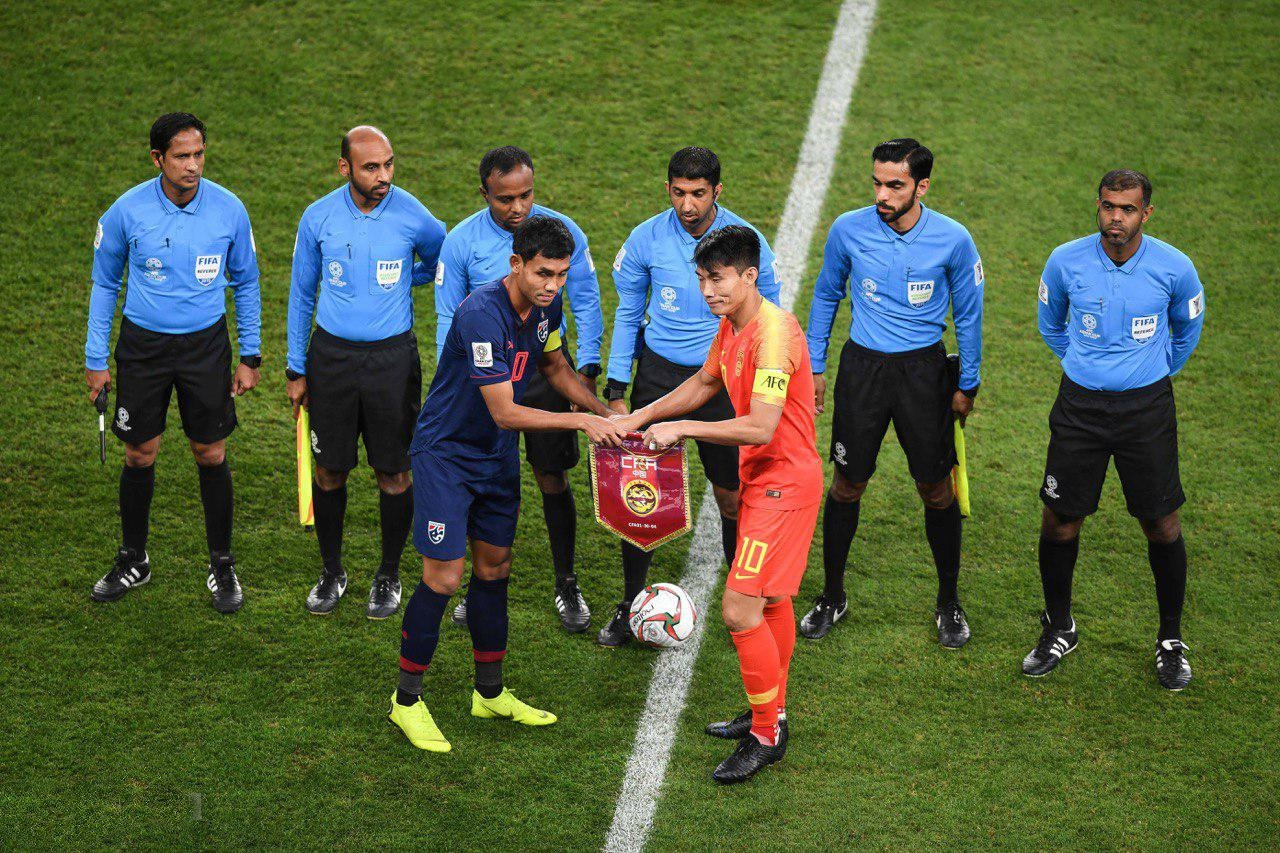
Teerasil shaking hands with Zheng Zhi at the 2019 AFC Asian Cup

=== Youth ===
Teerasil appeared for Thailand's under-16 and under-17 squads in 2004, being a part of the squad which played at the 2004 AFC U-17 Championship. Two years later, he was also included in the under-19 squad which played at the 2006 AFC Youth Championship, scoring the first of two goals in the 2–1 win against the United Arab Emirates; it was Thailand's only victory of the tournament.

In 2007, Teerasil appeared for the under-23s. He was part of the Olympic team which failed to make the final cut ahead of 2008 Summer Olympics. In December 2007 he won the U-23 Gold Medal at the Southeast Asian Games, scoring the winner against Myanmar.

=== Senior ===
In 2007, Teerasil received his first call-up to the Thailand national team, and was also into the 23-man squad ahead of 2007 AFC Asian Cup, being the youngest of the squad. However, he only appeared once in the whole tournament, coming on as a late substitute in a 1–1 draw against Iraq; the hosts subsequently failed to progress through the knockout stages, and finished third in Group A.

Teerasil was also selected to 2008 AFF Championship; he netted four times during the tournament as Thailand finished runner-up, losing to Vietnam. Teerasil scored his side's first in the second leg, but Vietnam managed to score a last-minute goal and was crowned champions. He was an ever-present figure in the international fold since October 2007, his second match being a FIFA World Cup Qualifying against Macau, where he scored the second of a 6–1 win. He was a member of the victorious squad of 2008 T&T Cup at Vietnam.

In the 2014 FIFA World Cup qualifiers, under the management of a newly appointed German coach Winfried Schafer, Teerasil featured constantly and scored against Australia and Oman, respectively. He was the top scorer for the 2012 AFF Suzuki Cup, during which he scored a hat-trick against Myanmar.

In 2013, he was called up to the national team by Surachai Jaturapattarapong to the 2015 AFC Asian Cup qualification. In October 2013 Teerasil played a friendly match against Bahrain, and scored against Iran in the following match, a 1–2 loss at Tehran.

In May 2015, he played for Thailand in the 2018 FIFA World Cup qualification match against Vietnam. In June 2015, he scored twice in the 2018 FIFA World Cup qualification match against Chinese Taipei.

In 2021, Teerasil became the all-time top scorer for the AFF Championship with 19 goals, breaking Noh Alam Shah's 17 goal record, after scoring against the Philippines in the 2020 AFF Championship.

=== Others ===
Teerasil won and scored a penalty for Thailand against FC Barcelona in the Catalans' 2013 Asian Tour in Bangkok.

== Style of play ==
Teerasil's style of play or role on the field could be described as a striker or deep-lying forward, as he often comes deep down to help the team maintain possession. Aside from his main position, he can play as the main reference upfront or as a midfielder (attacking midfielder or winger).

Teerasil possesses good ball control and is described as a quick, skillful player with strong vision. In addition to scoring goals, these attributes enable him to provide numerous assists for his teammates.

== Personal life ==
Teerasil was born in Bangkok with parents from Amphoe Sangkha, Surin province of Northeastern Thailand. His younger sister, Taneekarn, is a member of the Thailand women's national football team and also plays as a striker; his father was also a footballer and played for Royal Thai Air Force.

On 9 January 2016, he married his girlfriend Phusita Polrak. They have two children.

== Career statistics ==
=== Club ===
As of 19 May 2026

Appearances and goals by club, season and competition
Club	Season	League			National cup		League cup		Other		Total	
Club	Season	Division	Apps	Goals	Apps	Goals	Apps	Goals	Apps	Goals	Apps	Goals
Royal Thai Air Force	2005	Division 1	6	3	—		—		—		6	3
Raj Pracha	2006	Division 2	18	9	—		—		—		18	9
Muangthong United	2007	Division 2	15	7	—		—		—		15	7
Manchester City	2007–08	Premier League	0	0	0	0	0	0	—		0	0
Grasshopper II	2007–08	1. Liga Classic	6	2	—		—		—		6	2
Raj Pracha	2008	Division 2	10	6	—		—		—		10	6
Muangthong United	2009	Thai League	25	7	1	0	—		—		26	7
Muangthong United	2010	Thai League	26	7	3	2	—		7 (Note: Appearances in AFC Champions League Two)	1	36	10
Muangthong United	2011	Thai League	26	13	5	5	3	1	8 (Note: Appearances in AFC Champions League Elite)	4	42	23
Muangthong United	2012	Thai League	29	24	1	1	2	0	—		32	25
Muangthong United	2013	Thai League	32	15	4	4	2	1	6 (Note: Appearances in Kor Royal Cup)	0	44	20
Muangthong United	2014	Thai League	18	9	1	2	3	1	3	0	25	12
Muangthong United	Total		156	75	15	14	10	3	24	5	205	97
UD Almería	2014–15	La Liga	6	0	4	1	—		—		10	1
Muangthong United	2015	Thai League	34	11	6	1	1	2	—		41	14
Muangthong United	2016	Thai League	29	11	3	4	4	1	1	0	37	16
Muangthong United	2017	Thai League	31	14	4	1	5	5	8 (Note: Appearances in Thailand Champions Cup)	6	48	26
Muangthong United	2018	Thai League	0	0	0	0	0	0	2	0	2	0
Muangthong United	2019	Thai League	20	6	1	1	0	0	—		21	7
Muangthong United	Total		114	42	14	7	10	8	11	6	149	63
Sanfrecce Hiroshima	2018	J1 League	32	6	0	0	5	1	—		37	7
Shimizu S-Pulse	2020	J1 League	24	3	0	0	1	0	—		25	3
BG Pathum United	2020–21	Thai League	4	1	0	0	0	0	—		4	1
BG Pathum United	2021–22	Thai League	20	8	3	1	1	0	8	3	32	12
BG Pathum United	2022–23	Thai League	25	11	3	4	4	4	8	2	40	21
BG Pathum United	2023–24	Thai League	17	6	1	0	5	3	4	0	27	9
BG Pathum United	2024–25	Thai League	15	3	1	0	0	0	1 (Note: Appearances in ASEAN Club Championship)	1	17	4
BG Pathum United	Total		81	29	8	5	10	7	21	6	120	47
Bangkok United	2025–26	Thai League	24	5	4	2	2	3	12	1	42	11
Bangkok United	Career total		492	187	45	29	38	22	68	18	643	256

=== International ===
As of match played 9 June 2026

Appearances and goals by national team and year
National team	Year	Apps	Goals
Thailand	2007	7	2
Thailand	2008	14	8
Thailand	2009	9	6
Thailand	2010	5	0
Thailand	2011	7	3
Thailand	2012	10	9
Thailand	2013	7	1
Thailand	2014	1	0
Thailand	2015	10	4
Thailand	2016	15	9
Thailand	2017	6	2
Thailand	2018	4	0
Thailand	2019	9	3
Thailand	2020	0	0
Thailand	2021	6	4
Thailand	2022	9	7
Thailand	2023	8	6
Thailand	2024	1	0
Thailand	2025	0	0
Thailand	2026	2	0
Total		130	64

Scores and results list Thailand's goal tally first.

List of international goals scored by Teerasil Dangda
No.	Date	Venue	Opponent	Score	Result	Competition
1.	8 October 2007	Suphachalasai Stadium, Bangkok, Thailand	Macau	2–0	6–1	2010 FIFA World Cup qualification
2.	15 October 2007	Estádio Campo Desportivo, Taipa, Macau	Macau	1–0	7–1	2010 FIFA World Cup qualification
3.	20 May 2008	Rajamangala Stadium, Bangkok, Thailand	Nepal	1–0	7–0	Friendly
4.	20 May 2008	Rajamangala Stadium, Bangkok, Thailand	Nepal	4–0	7–0	Friendly
5.	25 May 2008	Rajamangala Stadium, Bangkok, Thailand	Iraq	2–0	2–1	Friendly
6.	16 November 2008	Mỹ Đình National Stadium, Hanoi, Vietnam	Vietnam	2–1	2–2	2008 VFF Cup
7.	10 December 2008	Surakul Stadium, Phuket, Thailand	Malaysia	2–0	3–0	2008 AFF Championship
8.	10 December 2008	Surakul Stadium, Phuket, Thailand	Malaysia	3–0	3–0	2008 AFF Championship
9.	16 December 2008	Gelora Bung Karno Stadium, Jakarta, Indonesia	Indonesia	1–0	1–0	2008 AFF Championship
10.	28 December 2008	Mỹ Đình National Stadium, Hanoi, Vietnam	Vietnam	1–0	1–1	2008 AFF Championship
11.	21 January 2009	Surakul Stadium, Phuket, Thailand	Lebanon	1–0	2–1	2009 King's Cup
12.	5 February 2009	Yurtec Stadium Sendai, Sendai, Japan	Saudi Arabia	1–2	1–2	Friendly
13.	28 March 2009	Suphachalasai Stadium, Bangkok, Thailand	New Zealand	1–1	3–1	Friendly
14.	28 March 2009	Suphachalasai Stadium, Bangkok, Thailand	New Zealand	3–1	3–1	Friendly
15.	18 July 2009	Thunderdome Stadium, Pak Kret, Thailand	Pakistan	1–0	4–0	Friendly
16.	18 July 2009	Thunderdome Stadium, Pak Kret, Thailand	Pakistan	3–0	4–0	Friendly
17.	14 July 2011	New I-Mobile Stadium, Buriram, Thailand	Myanmar	1–0	1–0	Friendly
18.	2 September 2011	Suncorp Stadium, Brisbane, Australia	Australia	1–0	1–2	2014 FIFA World Cup qualification
19.	6 September 2011	Rajamangala Stadium, Bangkok, Thailand	Oman	2–0	3–0	2014 FIFA World Cup qualification
20.	24 February 2012	700th Anniversary Stadium, Chiang Mai, Thailand	Maldives	2–0	3–0	Friendly
21.	17 November 2012	Rajamangala Stadium, Bangkok, Thailand	Bangladesh	2–0	5–0	Friendly
22.	17 November 2012	Rajamangala Stadium, Bangkok, Thailand	Bangladesh	3–0	5–0	Friendly
23.	17 November 2012	Rajamangala Stadium, Bangkok, Thailand	Bangladesh	4–0	5–0	Friendly
24.	27 November 2012	Rajamangala Stadium, Bangkok, Thailand	Myanmar	1–0	4–0	2012 AFF Championship
25.	27 November 2012	Rajamangala Stadium, Bangkok, Thailand	Myanmar	3–0	4–0	2012 AFF Championship
26.	27 November 2012	Rajamangala Stadium, Bangkok, Thailand	Myanmar	4–0	4–0	2012 AFF Championship
27.	9 December 2012	Bukit Jalil Stadium, Kuala Lumpur, Malaysia	Malaysia	1–1	1–1	2012 AFF Championship
28.	13 December 2012	Suphachalasai Stadium, Bangkok, Thailand	Malaysia	1–0	2–0	2012 AFF Championship
29.	15 October 2013	Azadi Stadium, Tehran, Iran	Iran	1–2	1–2	2015 AFC Asian Cup qualification
30.	16 June 2015	Taipei Municipal Stadium, Taipei, Taiwan	Chinese Taipei	1–0	2–0	2018 FIFA World Cup qualification
31.	16 June 2015	Taipei Municipal Stadium, Taipei, Taiwan	Chinese Taipei	2–0	2–0	2018 FIFA World Cup qualification
32.	3 September 2015	Rajamangala Stadium, Bangkok, Thailand	Afghanistan	2–0	2–0	Friendly
33.	12 November 2015	Rajamangala Stadium, Bangkok, Thailand	Chinese Taipei	1–1	4–2	2018 FIFA World Cup qualification
34.	3 June 2016	Rajamangala Stadium, Bangkok, Thailand	Syria	1–0	2–2	2016 King's Cup
35.	15 November 2016	Rajamangala Stadium, Bangkok, Thailand	Australia	1–1	2–2	2018 FIFA World Cup qualification
36.	15 November 2016	Rajamangala Stadium, Bangkok, Thailand	Australia	2–1	2–2	2018 FIFA World Cup qualification
37.	19 November 2016	Philippine Sports Stadium, Bocaue, Philippines	Indonesia	2–0	4–2	2016 AFF Championship
38.	19 November 2016	Philippine Sports Stadium, Bocaue, Philippines	Indonesia	3–2	4–2	2016 AFF Championship
39.	19 November 2016	Philippine Sports Stadium, Bocaue, Philippines	Indonesia	4–2	4–2	2016 AFF Championship
40.	4 December 2016	Thuwunna Stadium, Yangon, Myanmar	Myanmar	1–0	2–0	2016 AFF Championship
41.	4 December 2016	Thuwunna Stadium, Yangon, Myanmar	Myanmar	2–0	2–0	2016 AFF Championship
42.	14 December 2016	Pakansari Stadium, Bogor, Indonesia	Indonesia	1–0	1–2	2016 AFF Championship
43.	5 October 2017	Mandalarthiri Stadium, Mandalay, Myanmar	Myanmar	2–0	3–1	Friendly
44.	8 October 2017	SCG Stadium, Pak Kret, Thailand	Kenya	1–0	1–0	Friendly
45.	6 January 2019	Al Nahyan Stadium, Abu Dhabi, United Arab Emirates	India	1–1	1–4	2019 AFC Asian Cup
46.	10 October 2019	Leo Stadium, Pathum Thani, Thailand	Congo	1–0	1–1	Friendly
47.	15 October 2019	Thammasat Stadium, Pathum Thani, Thailand	United Arab Emirates	1–0	2–1	2022 FIFA World Cup qualification
48.	11 December 2021	National Stadium, Kallang, Singapore	Myanmar	1–0	4–0	2020 AFF Championship
49.	11 December 2021	National Stadium, Kallang, Singapore	Myanmar	2–0	4–0	2020 AFF Championship
50.	14 December 2021	National Stadium, Kallang, Singapore	Philippines	1–0	2–1	2020 AFF Championship
51.	14 December 2021	National Stadium, Kallang, Singapore	Philippines	2–1	2–1	2020 AFF Championship
52.	31 May 2022	BG Stadium, Pathum Thani, Thailand	Bahrain	1–0	1–2	Friendly
53.	8 June 2022	Markaziy Stadium, Namangan, Uzbekistan	Maldives	2–0	3–0	2023 AFC Asian Cup qualification
54.	11 December 2022	Thammasat Stadium, Pathum Thani, Thailand	Myanmar	1–0	6–0	Friendly
55.	11 December 2022	Thammasat Stadium, Pathum Thani, Thailand	Myanmar	5–0	6–0	Friendly
56.	20 December 2022	Kuala Lumpur Stadium, Kuala Lumpur, Malaysia	Brunei	2–0	5–0	2022 AFF Championship
57.	26 December 2022	Thammasat Stadium, Pathum Thani, Thailand	Philippines	1–0	4–0	2022 AFF Championship
58.	26 December 2022	Thammasat Stadium, Pathum Thani, Thailand	Philippines	2–0	4–0	2022 AFF Championship
59.	2 January 2023	Thammasat Stadium, Pathum Thani, Thailand	Cambodia	1–0	3–1	2022 AFF Championship
60.	2 January 2023	Thammasat Stadium, Pathum Thani, Thailand	Cambodia	3–1	3–1	2022 AFF Championship
61.	10 January 2023	Thammasat Stadium, Pathum Thani, Thailand	Malaysia	1–0	3–0	2022 AFF Championship
62.	16 June 2023	National Stadium, Kaohsiung, Taiwan	Chinese Taipei	1–1	2–2	Friendly
63.	19 June 2023	Hong Kong Stadium, So Kon Po, Hong Kong	Hong Kong	1–0	1–0	Friendly
64.	7 September 2023	700th Anniversary Stadium, Chiang Mai, Thailand	Lebanon	2–1	2–1	2023 King's Cup

== Honours ==
=== Club ===
Muangthong United

- Thai League 1: 2009, 2010, 2012, 2016
- Regional League Division 2: 2007
- Kor Royal Cup: 2010
- Thai League Cup: 2016, 2017
- Thailand Champions Cup: 2017
- Mekong Club Championship: 2017

BG Pathum United

- Thai League 1: 2020–21
- Thailand Champions Cup: 2021, 2022
- Thai League Cup: 2023–24

=== International ===
Thailand U-23

- SEA Games: 2007

Thailand

- AFF Championship: 2016, 2020, 2022
- King's Cup: 2016

=== Individual ===
- Goal.com readers' Asian Best XI of 2011
- AFF Championship overall top scorer with 25 goals
- AFF Championship Top Scorer: 2008, 2012, 2016, 2020, 2022
- AFF Championship Best XI: 2012, 2016, 2020, 2022
- ASEAN Football Federation Best XI: 2013, 2017
- Thai Premier League Top Scorer: 2012
- Thai Premier League Player of the Year: 2012

== See also ==
- List of men's footballers with 100 or more international caps
- List of men's footballers with 50 or more international goals
