= Piyaphon Phanichakul =

Thai footballer (born 1987)

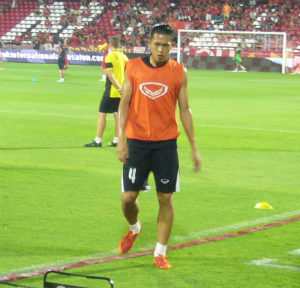

Personal information
- Full name: Piyaphon Phanichakul
- Birth name: Piyaphon Buntao
- Date of birth: 8 November 1987 (age 39)
- Place of birth: Khon Kaen, Thailand
- Height: 1.82 m (5 ft 11 1/2 in)
- Position: Right back

Team information
- Current team: Chiangrai United
- Number: 4

Youth career
- 2004–2005: Coke-Bangpra

Senior career*
Years	Team	Apps	(Gls)
2006–2009	Pattaya United	36	(1)
2009	Chonburi	9	(0)
2010–2016	Muangthong United	115	(6)
2016–2020	Chiangrai United	114	(12)
2020–2022	Buriram United	31	(4)
2022–2024	Nongbua Pitchaya	52	(6)
2024–	Chiangrai United	24	(1)

International career
2011–2014	Thailand	14	(0)

Managerial career
- 2019: Chiangrai United
- 2024: Chiangrai United
Medal record
Thailand
Asean Football Championship
Runner-up	AFF Suzuki Cup 2012	2012
- * Club domestic league appearances and goals as of 9 January 2026

Piyaphon Phanichakul (Thai: ปิยพล ผานิชกุล; RTGS: Piyaphon Phanitchakun, born November 8, 1987), born Piyaphon Buntao (Thai: ปิยพล บรรเทา; RTGS: Piyaphon Banthao), simply known as Dai (Thai: ไดร์), is a Thai professional footballer and coach. who plays as a right back for Thai League 1 club Chiangrai United.

== International career ==
Piyaphon was called up to the national team, in coach Winfried Schäfer first squad selection for the 2014 FIFA World Cup qualification. He was a starter playing as a right back in the 2012 AFF Suzuki Cup.

In 2014, he was called up to the national team by Kiatisuk Senamuang to play in the 2015 AFC Asian Cup qualification.

=== International ===
As of 12 November 2015

National team	Year	Apps	Goals
Thailand	2011	1	0
Thailand	2012	11	0
Thailand	2013	1	0
Thailand	2014	1	0
Thailand	Total	14	0

== Managerial statistics ==
As of 15 December 2024

Managerial record by team and tenure
Team	From	To	Record							
Team	From	To	G	W	D	L	GF	GA	GD	Win %
(Thailand) Chiangrai United	20 November 2024	22 December 2024	5	3	1	1	12	3	+9	60.00
Career total			5	3	1	1	12	3	+9	60.00

== Honours ==
=== Club ===
Muangthong United

- Thai League 1: 2010, 2012, 2016
- Kor Royal Cup: 2010

Chiangrai United

- Thai League 1: 2019
- Thai FA Cup: 2017, 2018
- Thai League Cup: 2018
- Thailand Champions Cup: 2018, 2020

Buriram United

- Thai League 1: 2021–22
- Thai FA Cup: 2021–22
- Thai League Cup: 2021–22
