= Christian Kouakou =

Ivorian footballer (born 1991)

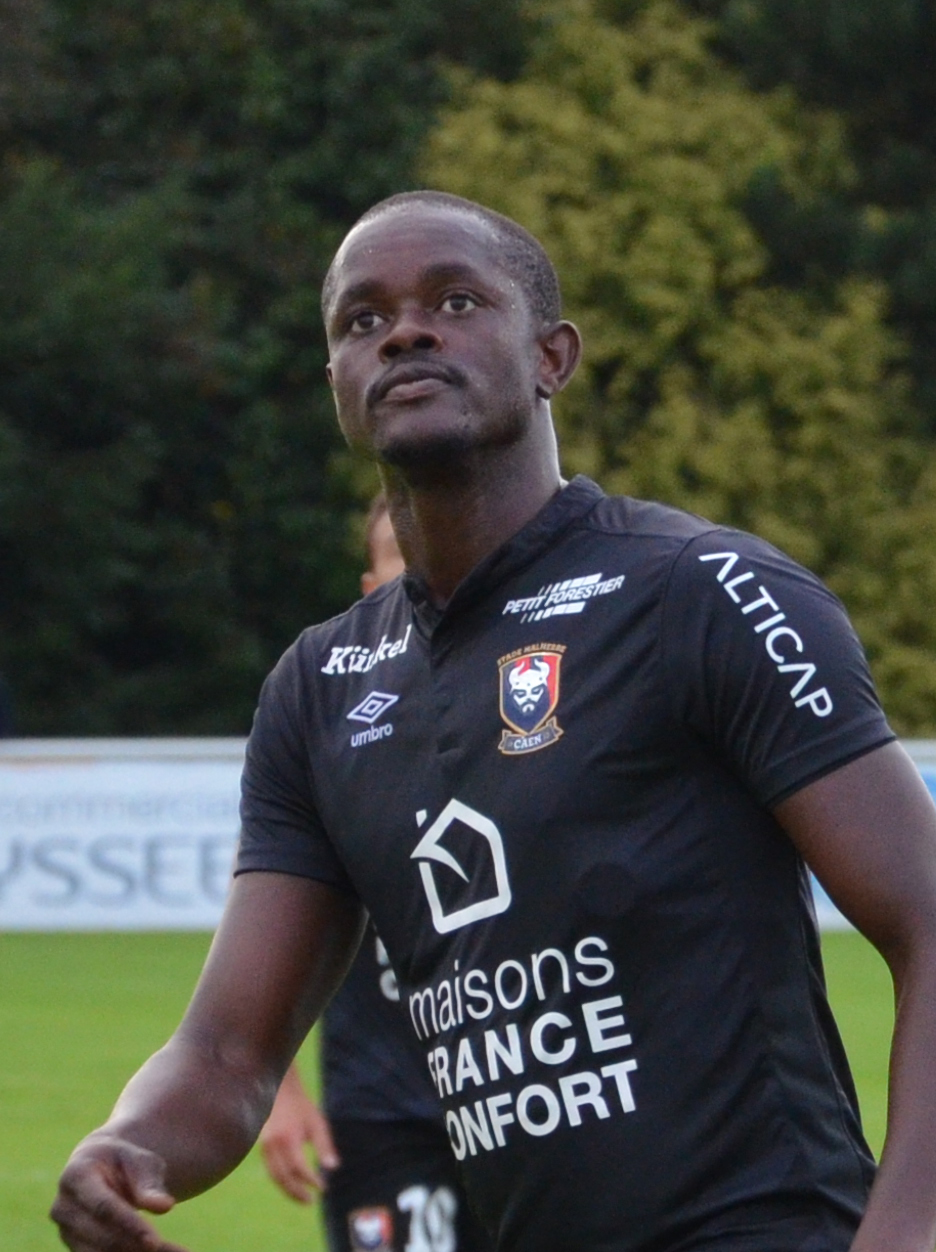
- Kouakou in 2016

Personal information
- Full name: Christian Kouakou Yao
- Date of birth: 1 March 1991 (age 35)
- Place of birth: M'Bonoua, Ivory Coast
- Height: 1.82 m (6 ft 0 in)
- Position: Forward

Youth career
- 2007: Toumodi
- 2007–2009: Anderlecht

Senior career*
Years	Team	Apps	(Gls)
2009	Anderlecht	0	(0)
2010–2012	Muangthong United	53	(22)
2012–2015	Tours	94	(25)
2016–2018	Caen	25	(2)
2016	→ Nîmes (loan)	28	(8)
2019	MFK Karviná	1	(0)
2019	Gabala	4	(0)
2021–2022	Bangladesh Police	20	(11)
2023–2024	Yenicami Ağdelen	16	(4)
- * Club domestic league appearances and goals as of 30 April 2022

Christian Kouakou Yao (born 1 March 1991) is an Ivorian professional footballer who plays as a forward.

== Career ==
Born in M'Bonoua, Kouakou began his career with Toumodi F.C.

In the summer of 2007, he moved to Europe signing a contract with R.S.C. Anderlecht's academy. After three years with the youth teams of Anderlecht, he signed in January 2010 for the Thai side, Muangthong United.

During the mid-season transfer period of the 2010–2011 season, he was linked with the Belgian Premier Division club KV Mechelen.

On 31 August 2016, Kouakou joined Nîmes Olympique from Stade Malherbe Caen on a season-long loan deal. In September 2018, he terminated his contract with Caen.

On 4 July 2019, Gabala FK signed Kouakou to a one-year contract, with the option of a second, from MFK Karviná.

On 2021 Christian Kouakou joined in Bangladesh Police. He scored his two goals against Abahani Limited Dhaka. He left the club in August 2021 after finishing the season.

In April 2022, he again joined Bangladesh Police for second phase of 2021–22 Bangladesh Premier League.

== Career statistics ==
=== Club ===
As of match played 30 April 2021

Club statistics
Club	Season	League			Cup		League Cup		Continental		Other		Total	
Club	Season	Division	Apps	Goals	Apps	Goals	Apps	Goals	Apps	Goals	Apps	Goals	Apps	Goals
Muangthong United	2010	Thai League 1							6	1			6	1
Muangthong United	2011	Thai League 1							10	5			10	5
Muangthong United	Total								16	6			16	6
Tours	2012–13	Ligue 2	24	4	0	0	2	0	–		–		26	4
Tours	2013–14	Ligue 2	34	9	0	0	4	0	–		–		38	9
Tours	2014–15	Ligue 2	18	6	2	0	1	0	–		–		21	6
Tours	2015–16	Ligue 2	18	6	2	0	2	1	–		–		22	7
Tours	Total		94	25	4	0	9	1	-	-	-	-	107	26
Tours II	2013–14	Championnat National 3	1	0	–		–		–		–		1	0
Tours II	2014–15	Championnat National 3	1	0	–		–		–		–		1	0
Tours II	Total		2	0	-	-	-	-	-	-	-	-	2	0
SM Caen	2015–16	Ligue 1	6	1	0	0	0	0	–		–		6	1
SM Caen	2016–17	Ligue 1	0	0	0	0	0	0	–		–		0	0
SM Caen	2017–18	Ligue 1	19	1	3	0	2	0	–		–		24	1
SM Caen	2018–19	Ligue 1	1	0	0	0	0	0	–		–		1	0
SM Caen	Total		26	2	3	0	2	0	-	-	-	-	31	2
SM Caen II	2016–17	Championnat National 3	2	0	–		–		–		–		2	0
SM Caen II	2017–18	Championnat National 3	4	2	–		–		–		–		4	2
SM Caen II	2018–19	Championnat National 3	2	0	–		–		–		–		2	0
SM Caen II	Total		8	2	-	-	-	-	-	-	-	-	8	2
Nîmes (loan)	2016–17	Ligue 2	28	8	0	0	–		–		–		28	8
Karviná	2018–19	Fortuna liga	1	0	0	0	–		–		–		1	0
Gabala	2019–20	Premier League	4	0	0	0	–		2	0	–		6	0
Bangladesh Police	2020–21	Bangladesh Premier League	10	7	0	0	–		0	0	–		10	7
Career total			173	44	7	0	11	1	18	6	-	-	211	51
