= Theerawat Pinpradub =

Thai footballer

Personal information
- Full name: Theerawat Pinpradub
- Date of birth: 11 July 1984 (age 42)
- Place of birth: Chonburi, Thailand
- Height: 1.83 m (6 ft 0 in)
- Position: Goalkeeper

Youth career
- 2006–2008: Muangthong United

Senior career*
Years	Team	Apps	(Gls)
2009–2011	Muangthong United	3	(0)
2009–2010	→ TOT (loan)	19	(0)
2011–2012	Phuket	15	(0)
2012–2013	Krabi	30	(0)
2013–2014	Chiangrai United	10	(0)
2015	Krabi	15	(0)
2016	Lampang	13	(0)
2017	Trat	27	(0)
2018	JL Chiangmai United	8	(0)
2018–2021	Samut Sakhon	63	(0)
2021–2022	Khon Kaen	12	(0)
2022	Kongkrailas United	9	(0)
2023	Udon Thani	6	(0)
2023	Customs United	6	(0)
Total		236	(0)
- * Club domestic league appearances and goals as of 10 December 2023 ‡ National team caps and goals as of 23 September 2010

Theerawat Pinpradub (Thai: ธีรวัฒน์ ปิ่นประดับ, born 11 July 1984) is a Thai retired professional footballer.

== Honours ==
=== Club ===
Muangthong United

- Thailand Premier League Champions (1) : 2010
