= Datsakorn Thonglao =

Thai footballer (born 1983)

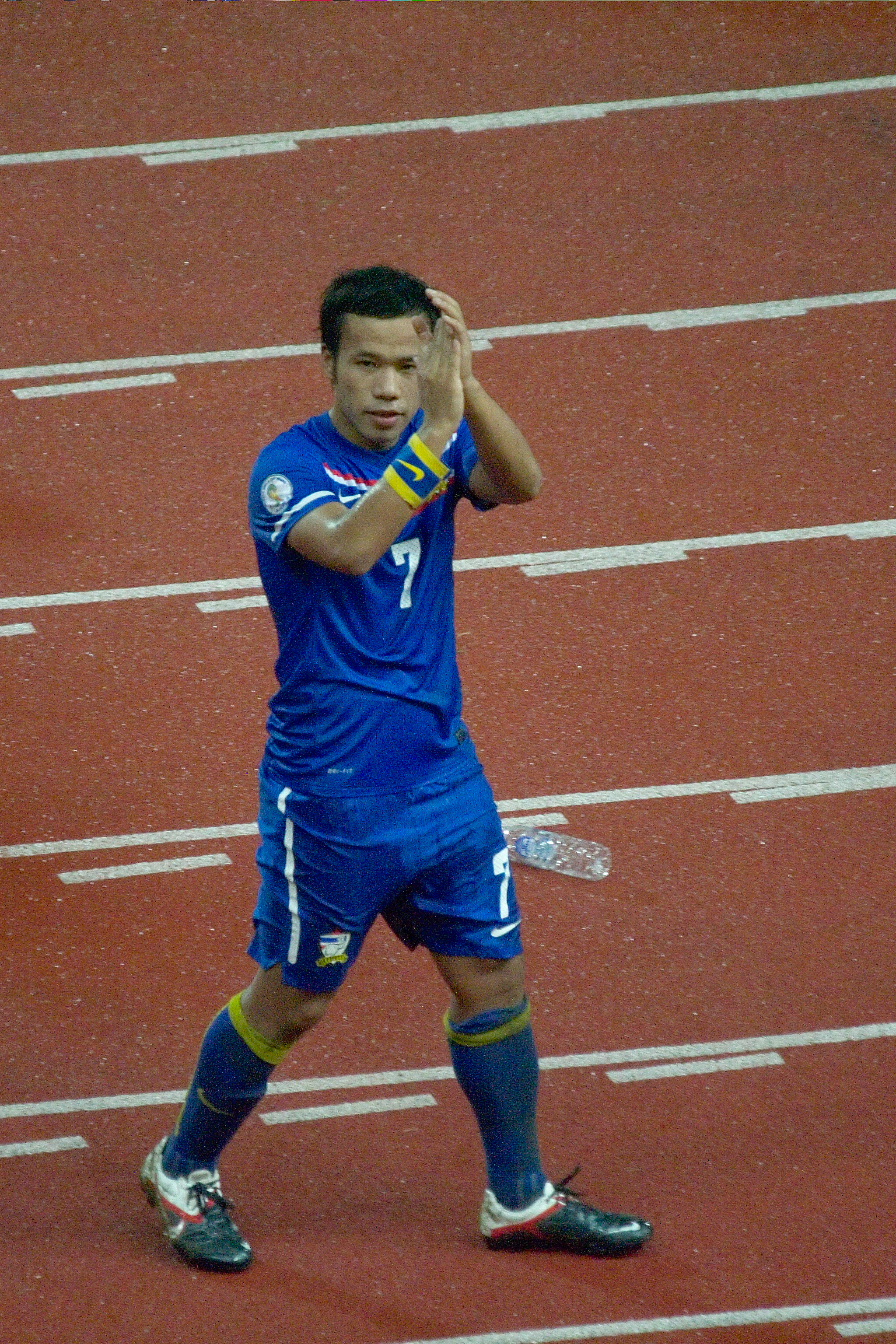

Personal information
- Full name: Datsakorn Thonglao
- Date of birth: 30 December 1983 (age 42)
- Place of birth: Nong Bua Lamphu, Thailand
- Height: 1.68 m (5 ft 6 in)
- Position: Attacking midfielder

Youth career
- 1995–1997: Wat Saket School
- 1998: Patumkongka School
- 1999: Rajdamnern Commercial College

Senior career*
Years	Team	Apps	(Gls)
1999	Rajpracha	23	(8)
2000–2006	BEC Tero Sasana	77	(18)
2001–2002	→ 1. FC Kaiserslautern II (loan)	7	(0)
2007–2009	Hoàng Anh Gia Lai	28	(12)
2010–2018	Muangthong United	172	(22)
2017	→ BEC Tero Sasana (loan)	23	(1)
2018	→ Udon Thani (loan)	21	(1)
2019	Simork	3	(0)
2019	Chonburi	5	(0)
2020–2021	Ayutthaya United	32	(4)
2021–2022	Uthai Thani	20	(0)
2022–2023	Kanchanaburi City	22	(0)
Total		433	(66)

International career
2001	Thailand U19	5	(0)
2001–2005	Thailand U23	15	(0)
2010	Thailand U23 (wildcard)	5	(2)
2001–2017	Thailand	100	(11)

Managerial career
- 2025–2026: Muangthong United (assistant)
Medal record
Thailand under-23
Sea Games
Gold medal – first place	Sea Games 2003	Football
Gold medal – first place	Sea Games 2005	Football
Thailand
Asean Football Championship
Silver medal – second place	Asean Football Championship 2007	2007
Silver medal – second place	AFF Suzuki Cup 2008	2008
Silver medal – second place	AFF Suzuki Cup 2012	2012
- * Club domestic league appearances and goals

Datsakorn Thonglao (Thai: ดัสกร ทองเหลา, RTGS: Datsakon Thonglao, pronounced [dàt.sā.kɔ̄ːn tʰɔ̄ːŋ.lǎw], born 30 December 1983), simply known as Go (Thai: โก้, RTGS: Ko, pronounced [kôː]) is a Thai former footballer who plays as an attacking midfielder. He was known for his deadly free kicks and set-pieces.

== Club career ==
=== BEC Tero Sasana ===
The young midfielder joined a Thai Premier League club, BEC Tero Sasana in a 2001-2002 season and eventually won the league title with the club at the end of the season. It was his first senior silverware.

After a successful season with BEC Tero Sasana, Datsakorn was given a chance to play for 1. FC Kaiserslautern on a season loan deal. The Bundesliga club also expressed their interest in permanently signing him. However, it was reported that Datsakorn refused to extend his contract with them as he was homesick.

Datsakorn returned to BEC Tero Sasana for the 2002-2003 season and led the team to the AFC Champions League final but lost to Al Ain FC of the UAE 1-2 on aggregate. The same season, his team became the runners-up in another 3 competitions: the ASEAN Club Championship, the Kor Royal Cup and the Thai Premier League.

=== Hoàng Anh Gia Lai ===
In 2007, Thonglao joined Hoàng Anh Gia Lai in V.League 1 and became a fan favourite despite not winning any silverware.

=== Muangthong United ===
In 2010, Thai Premier League champion Muangthong United signed Datsakorn for a reported fee of $200,000 (6.6 million baht as of 2010 exchange rate). It was speculated that, due to the deal, he became the highest paid Thai footballer at the time. He led Muangthong to win the 2009 Thai Premier League and became one of their key members. He won in 2010, 2012 and 2016.

== International career ==
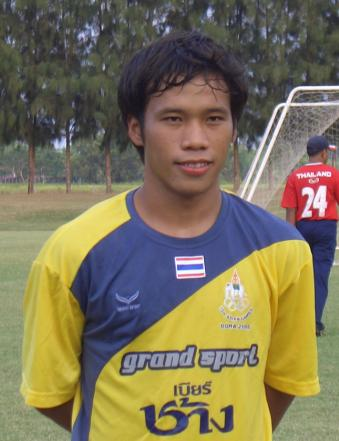
Datsakorn in 2006

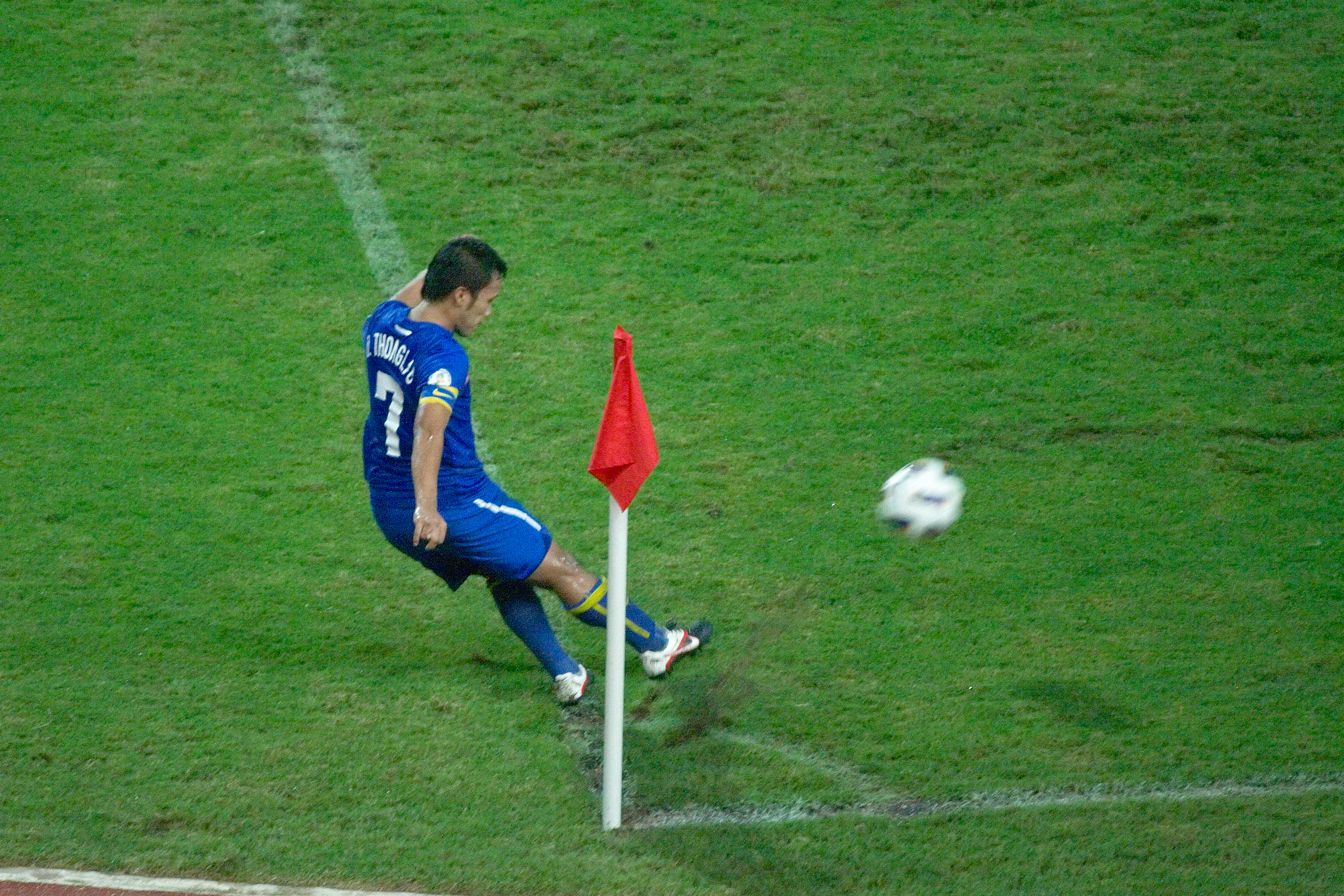
Datsakorn taking a corner kick against Oman in 2011

Datsakorn made his debut for the Thailand national team in 2001. He was first called up for the U-19 and U-23 squads for a short period and became a regular member of the senior squad soon afterwards. Datsakorn played for Thailand from 2001 to 2014, making 98 official appearances and scoring 11 goals.

He was criticized in his early years with the national team for his violent behavior, which led him to several sending-offs.

In 2007, he played again and scored two goals in a 2010 FIFA World Cup qualification match against Macau. This was not the only goal that he scored in the qualifiers. The other came in a 1-1 draw against Bahrain.

He won the T&T Cup with Thailand in 2008.

In the second round of 2014 FIFA World Cup qualification, Datsakorn scored 2 goals for Thailand in a 2-2 draw against Palestine.

He was one of Thailand's key players in the 2012 AFF Suzuki Cup. Despite suffering a groin injury, he played until the end of the tournament.

In October 2017, he made his 100th appearance for Thailand in a match against Kenya.

== International goals ==
#	Date	Venue	Opponent	Score	Result	Competition
1.	November 10, 2003	Tashkent, Uzbekistan	Hong Kong	1-2	Lost	2004 Asian Cup Qualification
2.	November 17, 2003	Bangkok, Thailand	Hong Kong	4-0	Won	2004 Asian Cup Qualification
3.	February 16, 2003	Bangkok, Thailand	North Korea	2-2	Draw	2003 King's Cup
4.	January 24, 2007	Hanoi, Vietnam	Vietnam	2-0	Won	2007 ASEAN Football Championship
5.	October 8, 2007	Bangkok, Thailand	Macau	6-1	Won	2010 FIFA World Cup Qualification
6.	October 15, 2007	Macau, Macau	Macau	7-1	Won	2010 FIFA World Cup Qualification
7.	June 7, 2008	Riffa, Bahrain	Bahrain	1-1	Draw	2010 FIFA World Cup Qualification
8.	July 28, 2011	West Bank, Palestine	Palestine	1-1	Draw	2014 FIFA World Cup Qualification
9.	July 28, 2011	West Bank, Palestine	Palestine	2-2	Draw	2014 FIFA World Cup Qualification
10.	February 24, 2012	Chiangmai, Thailand	Maldives	3-0	Won	Friendly Match
11.	January 26, 2013	Chiangmai, Thailand	North Korea	2-2	Draw	2013 King's Cup
Correct as of 13 January 2017

== Honours ==
=== Clubs ===
BEC Tero Sasana

- Thai Premier League (1): 2001-02
- Kor Royal Cup (1): 2000

Muangthong United

- Thai League 1 (3): 2010, 2012, 2016
- Kor Royal Cup (1): 2010
- Thai League Cup (1): 2016

Uthai Thani

- Thai League 3 (1): 2021–22
- Thai League 3 Northern Region (1): 2021–22

=== International ===
Thailand U-23

- Sea Games Gold Medal (3); 2001, 2003, 2005

Thailand

- T&T Cup (1): 2008

Individual

- ASEAN All-Stars: 2014

== Royal decoration ==
- 2005 - Member (Fifth Class) of The Most Admirable Order of the Direkgunabhorn

== See also ==
- List of men's footballers with 100 or more international caps
