= Thanongsak Panpipat =

Thai footballer

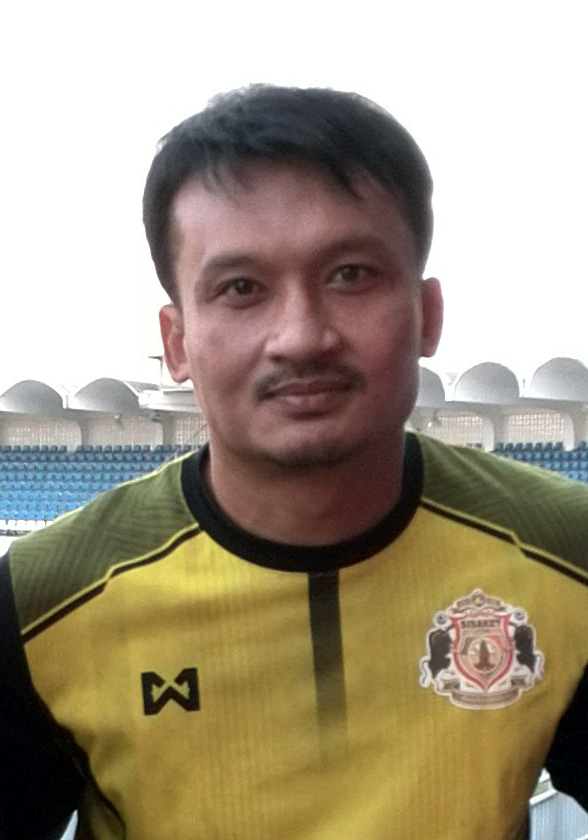

Personal information
- Full name: Thanongsak Panpipat
- Date of birth: 3 August 1979 (age 47)
- Place of birth: Suphan Buri, Thailand
- Height: 1.82 m (5 ft 11 1/2 in)
- Position: Goalkeeper

Team information
- Current team: Suphanburi
- Number: 23

Senior career*
Years	Team	Apps	(Gls)
2002–2004	Suphanburi	44	(0)
2005–2008	Bangkok Bank	97	(0)
2009–2010	Muangthong United	8	(0)
2009	→ Sriracha (loan)	0	(0)
2011–2012	BEC Tero Sasana	13	(0)
2012–2013	→ Chiangrai United (loan)	29	(0)
2013–2016	Chiangrai United	32	(0)
2017	Super Power Samut Prakan	6	(0)
2017–2018	Pattaya United	5	(0)
2019–2021	Sisaket	31	(0)
2021	Muang Loei United	7	(0)
2022	Bankhai United	10	(0)
2022–2023	Rayong	3	(0)
2023	Chainat Hornbill	7	(0)
2024–	Suphanburi	2	(0)
- * Club domestic league appearances and goals as of 26 April 2025

Thanongsak Panpipat (Thai: ทนงศักดิ์ พันพิพัฒน์, born August 3, 1979) is a Thai professional footballer who plays as a goalkeeper.

== Honours ==
=== Club ===
Muangthong United

- Thai Premier League (1): 2009, 2010
