= Jetsada Jitsawad =

Thai footballer (born 1980)

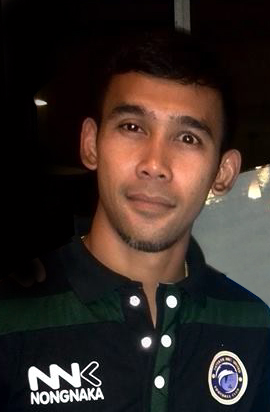

Personal information
- Full name: Jetsada Jitsawad
- Date of birth: 5 August 1980 (age 46)
- Place of birth: Bangkok, Thailand
- Height: 1.77 m (5 ft 9 1/2 in)
- Position: Centre back

Youth career
- 1998–2000: Tobacco Monopoly

Senior career*
Years	Team	Apps	(Gls)
2001–2008	Tobacco Monopoly	142	(4)
2009–2010	Muangthong United	57	(0)
2011–2012	BEC Tero Sasana	15	(0)
2012–2014	Chiangrai United	39	(0)
2015–2016	TTM Customs	20	(0)
2016	Pattaya United	0	(0)
Total		273	(4)

International career
2002–2013	Thailand	31	(0)

Managerial career
- 2016: Pattaya United (interim)
- 2020: Bang Pa-in Ayutthaya
- 2020: Udon Thani
- 2021–2022: Ayutthaya United
- 2023–: Muangthong United (assistant)
- * Club domestic league appearances and goals

Jetsada Jitsawad (Thai: เจษฎา จิตสวัสดิ์, born 5 August 1980) is a Thai former professional footballer who played as a centre back. He is currently assistant coach of Thai League 1 club Muangthong United.

== International career ==
Jetsada was called up to the national team, in coach Peter Withe first squad selection for the 2002 Asian Games, 2002 Tiger Cup winners and squad selection for the 2004 Asian Cup.

== Managerial career ==
On 1 June 2016, Pattaya United has appointed Jetsada Jitsawad as the caretaker to cover the resignation of Miloš Joksić.

== Career statistics ==
=== International ===
Appearances and goals by national team and year
National team	Year	Apps	Goals
Thailand	2002	1	0
Thailand	2003	1	0
Thailand	2004	4	0
Thailand	2005	–	
Thailand	2006	4	0
Thailand	2007	15	0
Thailand	2008	1	0
Thailand	2009	–	
Thailand	2010	1	0
Thailand	2011	–	
Thailand	2012	3	0
Thailand	2013	1	0
Total		31	0

== Honours ==
=== Club ===
Thailand Tobacco Monopoly

- Thai Premier League (1): 2004-05

Muangthong United

- Thai Premier League (2): 2009, 2010
- Kor Royal Cup (1): 2010
