= Pakasit Saensook =

Thai footballer (born 1984)

Personal information
- Full name: Pakasit Saensook
- Date of birth: 26 October 1984 (age 42)
- Place of birth: Bangkok, Thailand
- Height: 1.70 m (5 ft 7 in)
- Position: Right back

Senior career*
Years	Team	Apps	(Gls)
2006–2008	Chula United	44	(0)
2009–2011	Muangthong United	55	(0)
2011–2012	Army United	33	(2)
2013–2014	Bangkok United	41	(0)
2015–2017	Port	29	(0)
Total		202	(2)

Managerial career
- 2017–2020: Thailand U16 (assistant)
- * Club domestic league appearances and goals

Pakasit Saensook (Thai: ปกาศิต แสนสุข; born October 26, 1984) is a Thai retired professional footballer who plays as a right back.

== Personal life ==
Pakasit has a brother Pavarit Saensook is also a footballer as a defender.

== Honours ==
=== Club ===
Muangthong United

- Thai Premier League (2): 2009, 2010
- Kor Royal Cup (1) : 2010
