= Rangsan Iam-Wiroj =

Thai footballer (born 1982)

Personal information
- Full name: Rangsan Iam-Wiroj
- Date of birth: July 13, 1982 (age 44)
- Place of birth: Ang Thong, Thailand
- Height: 1.72 m (5 ft 7 1/2 in)
- Position: Right back

Senior career*
Years	Team	Apps	(Gls)
2002–2007	Bangkok Bank		
2007–2008	BEC Tero Sasana		
2009–2010	Thai Port		
2010–2014	Police United		
2014–2015	Air Force Central		
- * Club domestic league appearances and goals

Rangsan Iam-Wiroj, born July 13, 1982) is a Thai former professional footballer.

Rangsan is a tough tackling full back, who can also operate in midfield.

== Club career ==
He established himself as the first choice right back at Thai Port.

Rangsan missed out on playing in the 2009 Thai FA Cup Final against his former club BEC Tero due to Injury.

He was named 2009 Thai Port player of the season.

He played in the 2010 Thai League Cup final and won a winner's medal after Thai Port defeated Buriram PEA F.C. 2-1.

Rangsan transferred to Police United F.C. in December 2010.

== Honours ==
Thai FA Cup Winner

2009 - Thai Port FC
