= Panupong Wongsa =

Thai footballer

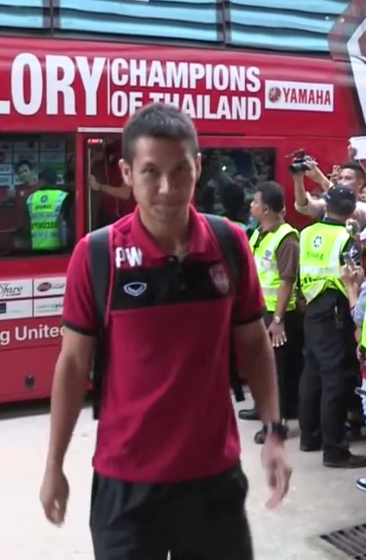

Personal information
- Full name: Panupong Wongsa
- Date of birth: 23 November 1983 (age 42)
- Place of birth: Chiang Mai, Thailand
- Height: 1.82 m (5 ft 11 1/2 in)
- Position: Centre back

Youth career
- 1996–2000: Montfort College
- 2001: Assumption College

Senior career*
Years	Team	Apps	(Gls)
2004	Chiangmai	26	(0)
2005–2007	Royal Thai Police	60	(1)
2008–2009	PEA	55	(1)
2010–2013	Muangthong United	93	(4)
2014	Suphanburi	30	(0)
2015–2017	Bangkok United	55	(0)
Total		319	(6)

International career^{‡}
2010	Thailand U23 (wildcard)		
2008–2013	Thailand	25	(0)

Managerial career
- 2018–2026: Bangkok United (assistant)
Medal record
Thailand
Asean Football Championship
Runner-up	AFF Suzuki Cup 2008	2008
Runner-up	AFF Suzuki Cup 2012	2012
- * Club domestic league appearances and goals as of 10:32, 24 November 2017 (UTC) ‡ National team caps and goals as of 10:32, 24 November 2017 (UTC)

Panupong Wongsa (Thai: ภานุพงษ์ วงศ์ษา) is a Thai retired professional footballer who played as a centre-back. He won the Thai Premier League in 2008, 2010 and 2012 with 1 champion PEA and 2 champions Muangthong United respectively.

== Club career ==
Panupong began his career with his hometown club, Chiangmai From 2002 to 2003 he played in the youth section of the club, and in 2004, he joined the senior team. In 2005, he moved to Royal Thai Police and completed for this club until 2007 a total of 60 games. For the 2008 season, he moved to PEA. At his new club, he could help to win the first championship (Thai Premier League) in club history. With the club he was in 2009 in the qualifying round of the 2009 AFC Champions League. Opponents were the Singapore Armed Forces After a 1-4 in extra time, he left with his club. But as to waste the skills of the club was allowed to participate in the 2009 AFC Cup and thus he gained his first experience in a Continental Vereinswettebwerb. End of the 2009 season, he was obliged by the new champion Muangthong United. Even with this club, he could participate in the qualifying round of the AFC Champions League. After the club was able to SHB Đà Nẵng 3-0 defeat in the first round, they met in the second round of the championship in Singapore. This was no less than the Singapore Armed Forces. Even in his second attempt, he managed not to take the hurdle. For him personally, tragically, the game had to be in the penalty shoot-determination. Panupong here was the second shooter of his team. His penalty shot was very poor and could be parried by the opposing end man.

Panupong officially announced his retirement from professional football on 25 November 2017 after the match 2017 Thai FA Cup Final.

== International career ==
For the Thailand national football team, he was so far in the U-23 squad and took part in the qualification for the Olympic Games in 2000. In the same year he won the gold medal with a choice at the Summer Universiade in 2007. A year later – in 2008 – they were among the cadres of ASEAN Football Championship. He became captain of the national team in 2012, and played an important role in the 2012 AFF Suzuki Cup.

=== International ===
As of 12 November 2015

National team	Year	Apps	Goals
Thailand	2008	1	0
Thailand	2009	4	0
Thailand	2010	9	0
Thailand	2011	1	0
Thailand	2012	10	0
Thailand	2013	2	0
Thailand	Total	27	0

== Honours ==
=== Clubs ===
PEA

- Thai Premier League (1): 2008

Muangthong United

- Thai Premier League (1): 2010, 2012

=== Individual ===
- ASEAN Football Federation Best XI: 2013
