= Dagno Siaka =

Ivorian footballer

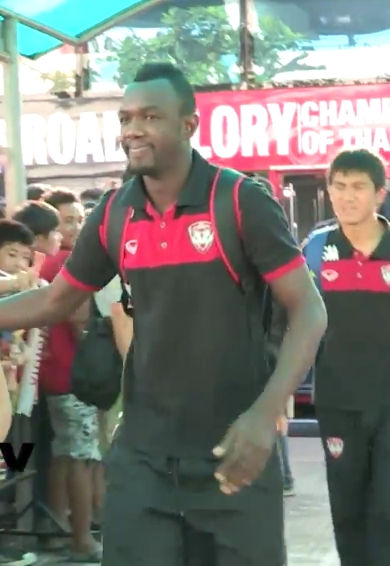
- Dagno in 2013

Personal information
- Full name: Dagno Siaka
- Date of birth: 11 November 1986 (age 39)
- Place of birth: Abidjan, Ivory Coast
- Height: 1.85 m (6 ft 1 in)
- Position: Midfielder

Youth career
- 2002–2006: Séwé Sports de San Pedro

Senior career*
Years	Team	Apps	(Gls)
2007	Séwé Sports de San Pedro	14	(8)
2008–2014	Muangthong United	113	(35)
2014–2015	Police United	19	(1)
2016	Khon Kaen United	0	(0)
2017	Bangkok	0	(0)
Total		146	(44)

International career
2006	Ivory Coast U-20	8	(2)

Managerial career
- 2019: Muangthong United (youth)
- 2020: Udon Thani (assistant)
- 2020–2026: Muangthong United (assistant)
- * Club domestic league appearances and goals as of 28 April 2013

Dagno Siaka (born 11 November 1987 in Abidjan) is a former professional footballer from Ivory Coast.

Dagno Siaka was regarded as a notable player in Thai football during his career in the Thai league. His performances led some supporters to express interest in him representing the Thailand national football team through naturalization.

== Honours ==
=== Club ===
Muangthong United

- Thai Premier League (3): 2009, 2010, 2012
- Kor Royal Cup (1): 2010
- Thai Division 1 League (1): 2008

Police United

- Thai Division 1 League (1): 2015

Individual

- Thai Premier League Midfielder of the Year (1): 2013
