= Moussa Sylla (footballer, born 1989) =

Ivorian footballer

Personal information
- Date of birth: 15 June 1985 (age 41)
- Place of birth: Abidjan, Ivory Coast
- Height: 1.73 m (5 ft 8 in)
- Positions: Defensive midfielder; central midfielder

Senior career*
| Years | Team | Apps | (Gls) |
| 2004–2006 | EFYM | 56 | (4) |
| 2006–2008 | Royal Thai Army | 60 | (8) |
| 2009–2010 | Muangthong United | 46 | (1) |
| 2010–2011 | Bangkok Glass | 40 | (0) |
| 2012–2013 | BBCU | 59 | (3) |
| 2014 | Pattaya United | 33 | (1) |
| 2015 | Phuket | 28 | (0) |
| 2016 | Paknampho NSRU | 26 | (1) |
| Total | | 348 | (18) |
- * Club domestic league appearances and goals

Moussa Sylla (born 15 June 1985) is an Ivorian retired professional footballer who plays as a defensive midfielder.

== Career ==
Sylla began 2002 on youth side. In the spring of 2003 signed in the Ivory Coast with Ecole de Football Yéo Martial and was here a year later (2004) promoted into the first team. He left after 30 games in two years on professional level for EFYM in January 2005 to Royal Thai Army FC. Sylla was by Royal Thai Army named as Best foreign Player and signed than in February 2009 for Muangthong United, who won in his first season League Championship.

== Honours ==
Muangthong United

- Thai Premier League: 2009
