= Yaya Soumahoro =

Ivorian former professional footballer (born 1989)

Personal information
- Full name: Yaya Alfa Soumahoro
- Date of birth: 28 September 1989 (age 37)
- Place of birth: Abidjan, Ivory Coast
- Height: 1.70 m (5 ft 7 in)
- Position: Attacking midfielder

Youth career
- 2005–2006: JCI University

Senior career*
Years	Team	Apps	(Gls)
2007	Séwé Sports	9	(2)
2008–2010	Muangthong United	72	(32)
2010–2016	Gent	103	(13)
2016	Sint-Truidense	5	(0)
2016	Muangthong United	0	(0)
2018–2019	Wadi Degla	8	(0)
Total		197	(47)

International career
2011	Ivory Coast U-23		
- * Club domestic league appearances and goals as of 12:05, 24 April 2019 (UTC)

Yaya Alfa Soumahoro (born 28 September 1989) is an Ivorian former professional footballer who plays as an attacking midfielder.

Having begun his career with Séwé Sports in his native country, he joined Thai club Muangthong United in 2008. His good performances earned him a move to K.A.A. Gent in 2010. He spent five and a half seasons with Gent but was plagued by recurring injuries throughout his time there. Following a half-season loan to Sint-Truidense V.V., he returned to Muangthong United where did not feature. In 2018, he joined the Egyptian side Wadi Degla SC.

== Early life ==
Soumahoro grew in the Ivorian capital Abidjan. He learned to play football in the streets and he decided to play for Séwé Sports. Soumahoro lost both parents at an early age and was taken care by a foster family.

== Club career ==
=== Muangthong United ===
In 2008 Soumahoro moved to Thai Premier League side Muangthong United from Séwé Sports. He became a figurehead in this team, as he scored many goals and charmed the supporters with his numerous dribbles. He scored 32 goals in 72 games and helped the club win the Thai Premier League Championship Thai Division 1 League in 2008 and the Thai Premier League in 2009.

=== Gent ===
On 1 July 2010, Soumahoro joined Belgian club K.A.A. Gent on a three-year contract. On 22 August, he impressed in 3–1 league win against Charleroi scoring and assisting a goal each while also winning a penalty which Shlomi Arbeitman failed to convert. Four days later, he scored a goal to put Gent level on aggregate in a UEFA Europa League qualifying match against Feyenoord. His side went on to win 2–0 and qualify for the UEFA Europa League.

In September 2010, Soumahoro sustained a hamstring injury in a league match against Zulte Waregem and was substituted off after 73 minutes. It was announced he would be out of action for four weeks. In October 2010, he signed a one-year contract extension, tying him to the club until 2014.

In April 2011, he received a three-match suspension.

In March 2012, it was announced Soumahoro would need to undergo surgery likely ruling him out for the rest of the 2012–13 season.

In October 2013, he signed a two-year contract extension with Gent, keeping him at the club until 2016.

On 20 September 2015, Soumahoro made his first starting appearance after an injury layoff in a league match against Standard Liège. He had to leave the pitch after twisting his knee. With his contract set to expire at the end of the 2015–16 season Gent were looking to transfer Soumahoro. He did not take part in the club's winter training camp and instead trained with the reserves in wait of contract offers from other clubs. On 8 January 2016, Soumahoro rejected a move involving a 2.5-year deal to Cypriot club Anorthosis Famagusta. On 12 January, he joined Gent's league rivals Sint-Truidense V.V. on loan until the end of the season.

=== After Gent ===
In June 2016 Soumahoro returned to former club Muangthong United. Six months later, his contract was terminated after he had not made any appearances due to injury problems.

In July 2018, he trialled with Belgian First Division B side K.S.V. Roeselare. He sustained an injury in a friendly match with Crawley Town and was not signed by Roeselare.

In October 2018, Soumahoro joined Egyptian Premier League side Wadi Degla SC as a free agent.

== Honours ==
Muangthong United

- Thai Division 1 League: 2008
- Thai Premier League: 2009

Gent

- Belgian Pro League: 2014–15
- Belgian Super Cup: 2015
