= Piyachart Tamaphan =

Thai footballer

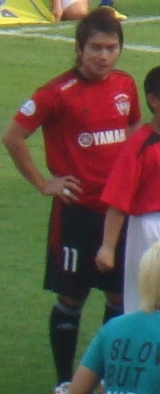

Personal information
- Full name: Piyachart Tamaphan
- Date of birth: 5 May 1986 (age 40)
- Place of birth: Amnat Charoen, Thailand
- Height: 1.72 m (5 ft 7 1/2 in)
- Position: Left back

Youth career
- 2001–2005: Bangkok Christian College

Senior career*
| Years | Team | Apps | (Gls) |
| 2006–2008 | Chula United | 37 | (6) |
| 2009–2012 | Muangthong United | 65 | (3) |
| 2011 | → BEC Tero Sasana (loan) | 26 | (1) |
| 2013–2015 | Bangkok Glass | 34 | (2) |
| 2015–2017 | Port | 25 | (2) |
| 2017 | → Ubon UMT United (loan) | 11 | (2) |
| 2018 | Ubon UMT United | 11 | (1) |
| 2018–2019 | PT Prachuap | 24 | (1) |
| 2020–2021 | Ayutthaya United | 10 | (0) |
| 2021–2022 | Ubon Kruanapat | 14 | (0) |
| Total | | 257 | (18) |

International career^{‡}
| 2009–2010 | Thailand U23 | 2 | (1) |
| 2010 | Thailand | 4 | (0) |

Managerial career
- 2022–2023: Amnat United
- * Club domestic league appearances and goals as of 22 June 2008 ‡ National team caps and goals as of 29 February 2012

Piyachart Tamaphan (Thai: ปิยะชาติ ถามะพันธ์), simply known as Matt (Thai: แมท) is a Thai retired professional footballer who played as a left back.

== International career ==
In January 2010, Piyachart was called up by Bryan Robson to play for Thailand in the 2010 King's Cup.

=== International ===
As of 28 March 2017

| National team | Year | Apps | Goals |
|---|---|---|---|
| Thailand | 2010 | 2 | 0 |
| Thailand | 2012 | 2 | 0 |
| Thailand | Total | 4 | 0 |

== Honours ==
=== Club ===
Muangthong United

- Thai Premier League (2): 2009, 2012

Bangkok Glass

- Thai FA Cup (1): 2014

PT Prachuap FC

- Thai League Cup (1) : 2019
