= Nattaporn Phanrit =

Thai footballer (born 1982)

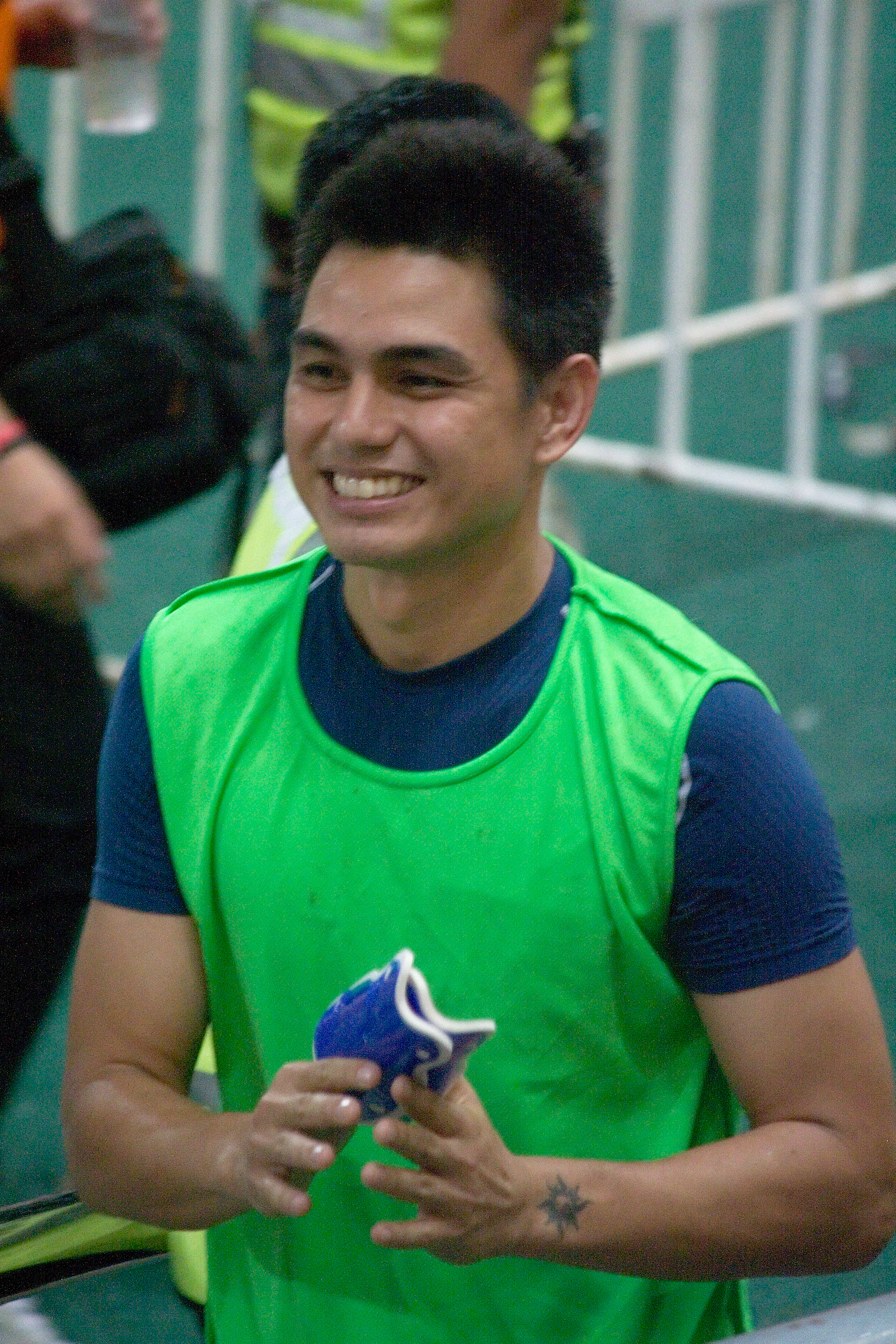
- Nattaporn in 2011

Personal information
- Full name: Nattaporn Phanrit
- Date of birth: 11 January 1982 (age 44)
- Place of birth: Nakhon Sawan, Thailand
- Height: 1.83 m (6 ft 0 in)
- Positions: Centre-back; left back

Youth career
- 1999–2000: Assumption College Sriracha

Senior career*
Years	Team	Apps	(Gls)
2001–2004	Tobacco Monopoly	65	(5)
2005–2006	PEA	46	(2)
2007–2008	Chonburi	66	(1)
2009–2012	Muangthong United	79	(9)
2012–2013	BEC Tero Sasana	17	(1)
2013–2014	Bangkok United	22	(0)
2014	Air Force Central	14	(0)
2015	Pattaya United	17	(0)
2015–2018	Navy	93	(2)
Total		416	(20)

International career^{‡}
1998–1999	Thailand U17	6	(0)
2010	Thailand U23 (wildcard)	5	(0)
2003–2012	Thailand	70	(3)

Managerial career
- 2020–2022: Bang Pa-in Ayutthaya
Medal record
Thailand under-23
Sea Games
Gold medal – first place	Sea Games 2003	Football
Gold medal – first place	Sea Games 2005	Football
Thailand
Asean Football Championship
Runner-up	ASEAN Football Championship 2007	2007
Runner-up	AFF Suzuki Cup 2008	2008
Runner-up	AFF Suzuki Cup 2012	2012
- * Club domestic league appearances and goals as of 03:31, 17 October 2018 (UTC) ‡ National team caps and goals as of 29 February 2012

Nattaporn Phanrit (Thai: ณัฐพร พันธุ์ฤทธิ์, born January 11, 1982), simply known as Oat (Thai: โอ๊ต), is a Thai retired professional footballer who played as a centre-back. He initially played as a left back but moved inside to more central position later, he is regularly serving both the club and national team as centre back.

== Club career ==
Nattaporn spent his youth career with Assumption Sriracha College between 1999 and 2000. He signed his first professional contract with Thai Premier League side Tobacco Monopoly (now TTM Chiangmai) in 2001. The left back at the moment spent 4 years with the club and won 1 Thai Premier League title in 2004–2005.

The defender left the club in 2005 to join PEA (later became to Buriram PEA) and spent a season with the new club.

In 2007, Nattaporn joined a newly Thai Premier League champions Chonburi. However, the only accomplishment of his new club in the 2007–2008 season was only winning Kor Royal Cup, while finished only runners up in the league, ironically, the champions were his former club PEA, and the club were also knocked out of AFC Champions League in the group stage.

In contrast, the strong centre back won 2008's Defender of the Year award.

In 2009, the Thai defender switched to a Nonthaburi based club Muangthong United. This time he won league title with his new club in the first season, and also managed to retain the title in the next year. The 2009 Thai Premier League title was his second league title after a long wait from 2004 league title with Tobacco Monopoly (TTM Phichit at the time)

As of upcoming 2012 season, Nattaporn made totally 262 appearances with 4 Thai Premier League clubs and scored a wonder 16 goals as a defender.

Nattaporn officially announced his retirement from professional football on 11 January 2019 with 18 years on football path.

== International career ==
Nattaporn was first called up to Thailand national team in 2003, initially served as left back before firmly established himself into the first team as centre back. He was a first team regular in the reign of Peter Reid and Bryan Robson but later dropped to a substitution in recent months of German Winfried Schäfer's management. Nattaporn played in the 2012 King's Cup and the 2012 AFF Suzuki Cup.

Nattaporn played in the 2010 Asian Games.

Nattaporn was also a member of the victorious T&T Cup 2008 winning squad.

== International goals ==
#	Date	Venue	Opponent	Score	Result	Competition
1.	22 December 2007	Rajamangala Stadium, Bangkok, Thailand	Uzbekistan	3–2	3-2	2007 King's Cup
2	24 December 2007	Rajamangala Stadium, Bangkok, Thailand	Iraq	1–0	2-1	2007 King's Cup
3.	16 November 2008	Mỹ Đình National Stadium, Hanoi, Vietnam	Vietnam	1–0	2-2	2008 T&T Cup

== Honours ==
=== Club ===
Tobacco Monopoly

- Thai Premier League: 2004-05

Chonburi

- Thai Premier League : 2007
- Kor Royal Cup: 2008

Muangthong United

- Thai Premier League: 2009, 2010

=== International ===
Thailand U-23

- Sea Games gold medal: 2003, 2005

Thailand

- T&T Cup: 2008

=== Individual ===
- Thai Premier League Defender of the Year: 2008
