= 2009 Chonburi F.C. season =

Chonburi
2009 season
- Chairman: Wittaya Khunpluem
- Head Coach: Kiatisuk Senamuang
- Thai Premier League: 2nd
- Thai FA Cup: Fourth Round
- Kor Royal Cup: Winners
- AFC Cup: Quarter-finals
- Top goalscorer: League: Kone Mohamed (11); All: Kone Mohamed (18)
Home colours	Away colours

The 2009 season is Chonburi's 4th season in the Thai Premier League of Chonburi Football Club.

== Pre-season and friendlies ==
Date	Opponents	H / A	Result F–A	Scorer(s)
6 July 2009	Chaiyaphum United	A	2–6	Pipob, Byrne, Joílson, Douglas
8 July 2009	Khonkaen	A	3–2	Phanuwat 4', Joílson 41'
11 July 2009	Nakhon Ratchasima	A	0–4	Pipob (2) 20' 41', Teerasak 23', Joílson 63'
12 July 2009	Buriram	A	1–2	Chayakhorn (o.g.), Joílson

== Kor Royal Cup ==
Date	Opponents	H / A	Result F–A	Scorer(s)
1 March 2009	PEA	N	0–1	Suree 75'

== Thai Premier League ==
Date	Opponents	H / A	Result F–A	Scorers
7 March 2009	BEC Tero Sasana	H	1–0	Arthit 65'
14 March 2009	Osotsapa M-150	H	1–0	Anderson 49'
22 March 2009	Pattaya United	A	0–0	
4 April 2009	Bangkok Glass	H	1–3	Koné 7'
10 April 2009	TOT	H	2–1	Arthit 18', Koné 90'
18 April 2009	Sriracha	A	0–1	Kiatprawut 18'
25 April 2009	PEA	A	0–1	Kiatprawut 2', Anderson 69'
2 May 2009	Bangkok United	H	5–1	Arthit (2) 18' 75', Natthaphong 38', Koné 47', Anderson 90'
10 May 2009	Samut Songkhram	A	0–1	Arthit 84'
24 May 2009	Nakhon Pathom	H	3–0	Koné 18', Pipob 46', Maruyama 83'
30 May 2009	Muangthong United	H	2–5	Arthit 13', Koné 30'
6 June 2009	Chula United	A	0–1	Koné 68'
10 June 2009	TTM Samut Sakhon	A	2–1	Jetsadakorn 72'
13 June 2009	Rajnavy Rayong	H	2–1	Koné 9' 19'
20 June 2009	Thai Port	A	1–2	Pipob 10', Koné 66'
26 July 2009	BEC Tero Sasana	A	1–2	Pipob 8', Kriangkrai 22'
2 August 2009	Osotsapa M-150	A	1–2	Arthit 52', Koné 88'
9 August 2009	Pattaya United	H	2–0	Arthit 3', Koné 88'
12 August 2009	Bangkok Glass	A	1–0	
15 August 2009	TOT	A	0–0	
22 August 2009	Sriracha	H	3–2	Ekaphan (2) 5' 90', Byrne 34'
29 August 2009	PEA	H	3–0	Ekaphan 34', Byrne 48', Pipob 55'
6 September 2009	Bangkok United	A	1–1	Byrne 40'
12 September 2009	Samut Songkhram	H	2–0	Pipob 46' 84'
20 September 2009	TTM Samut Sakhon	H	2–2	Benie 25', Byrne 89'
26 September 2009	Nakhon Pathom	A	1–2	Jetsadakorn 25', Benie 73'
4 October 2009	Muangthong United	A	1–1	Koné 3'
7 October 2009	Chula United	H	2–2	
11 October 2009	Rajnavy Rayong	A	0–1	
18 October 2009	Thai Port	H	2–0	

=== League table ===
Pos	Team	Pld	W	D	L	GF	GA	GD	Pts	Qualification or relegation
1	Muang Thong United (Note: Promoted from last season)	30	19	8	3	48	20	+28	65	2010 AFC Champions League Qualifying play-off
2	Chonburi	30	18	8	4	50	30	+20	62	
3	Bangkok Glass	30	16	8	6	45	31	+14	56	
4	BEC Tero Sasana	30	15	6	9	53	34	+19	51	
5	Osotspa Saraburi	30	13	8	9	36	32	+4	47	

Updated to match(es) played on October 18, 2009. Source:
Rules for classification: 1) points; 2) goal difference; 3) number of goals scored.

== Thai FA Cup ==
Date	Opponents	H / A	Result F–A	Scorers	Round
26 August 2009	Pattaya 8 School	A	1–4	Pipob 2', Kaneung 42', Joílson 76', Byrne 85'	Round of 32
23 September 2009	Osotsapa M-150	A	2–1	Benie 71'	Round of 16

== AFC Cup ==
Date	Opponents	H / A	Result F–A	Scorers	Round
10 March 2009	Eastern	H	4–1	Kraisorn 8', Koné 45', Pipob 56', Phanuwat 76'	Group G, Match Day 1
17 March 2009	Kedah	A	0–1	Koné 31'	Group G, Match Day 2
7 April 2009	Hanoi ACB	A	0–2	Arthit 52', Ekaphan 60'	Group G, Match Day 3
21 April 2009	Hanoi ACB	H	6–0	Phanuwat 15', Koné 21', Pipob 45', Suree 65', Anderson 68', Kraisorn 90'	Group G, Match Day 4
5 May 2009	Eastern	A	2–1	Ekaphan 29'	Group G, Match Day 5
19 May 2009	Kedah	A	3–1	Pipob 14'40', Douglas 85'	Group G, Match Day 6

Group G Table

Team	Pld	W	D	L	GF	GA	GD	Pts
(Thailand) Chonburi	6	5	0	1	17	4	+13	15
(Malaysia) Kedah	6	2	1	3	14	10	+4	7
(Hong Kong) Eastern	6	2	1	3	9	13	−4	7
(Vietnam) Hanoi ACB	6	2	0	4	6	19	−13	6

=== Knockout phase ===
Date	Opponents	H / A	Result F–A	Scorers	Round
23 June 2009	PSMS Medan	H	4–0	Koné 19'67'90', Ekaphan 87'	Round of 16
15 September 2009	Becamex Binh Duong	H	2–2	Pipob 20', Arthit 70'	Quarter-finals
30 September 2009	Becamex Binh Duong	A	2–0		Quarter-finals

== Squad statistics ==
No.	Pos.	Name	League		FA Cup		Asia		Total		Discipline	
No.	Pos.	Name	Apps	Goals	Apps	Goals	Apps	Goals	Apps	Goals	Yellow card	Red card
1	GK	(Thailand) Sujin Naknayom	4	0	2	0	1	0	7	0	0	0
2	DF	(Thailand) Suree Sukha	20	0	1	0	4	1	25	1	5	0
3	DF	(Thailand) Natthaphong Samana	26	1	0	0	8	0	34	1	3	0
4	DF	(Thailand) Kiatprawut Saiwaeo	14	2	0	0	5	0	19	2	0	0
5	MF	(Thailand) Phanuwat Jinta	21	0	0	0	6	2	27	2	1	0
6	DF	(Thailand) Suttinan Phuk-hom	9	0	2	0	4	0	15	0	1	2
7	MF	(Thailand) Arthit Sunthornpit	24	8	1	0	8	2	33	10	4	0
8	MF	(Thailand) Sarawut Janthapan	1	0	0	0	0	0	1	0	0	0
9	FW	(Brazil) Joílson	5	0	2	1	0	0	7	1	0	0
10	FW	(Thailand) Pipob On-Mo	25	5	1	1	7	5	33	11	2	0
14	FW	(Brazil) Anderson	9	3	0	0	4	1	13	4	0	0
16	DF	(Japan) Yoshiaki Maruyama	12	1	0	0	0	0	12	1	1	1
17	MF	(Thailand) Kriangkrai Pimrat	17	1	2	0	6	0	25	1	1	0
18	GK	(Thailand) Kosin Hathairattanakool	24	0	0	0	7	0	31	0	0	0
19	MF	(Thailand) Adul Lahso	18	0	0	0	4	0	22	0	2	0
20	DF	(Brazil) Douglas	1	0	0	0	4	1	5	1	1	0
21	GK	(Thailand) Sakkongpob Sukprasert	0	0	0	0	0	0	0	0	0	0
22	MF	(Ivory Coast) Mohamed Koné	22	11	1	1	7	6	30	18	2	1
23	MF	(Thailand) Teerasak Po-on	1	0	1	0	3	1	5	1	0	0
24	MF	(Thailand) Ekaphan Inthasen	22	3	0	0	7	3	29	6	1	0
25	DF	(Thailand) Chonlatit Jantakam	23	0	1	0	6	1	30	1	1	0
29	DF	(Thailand) Jetsadakorn Hemdaeng	12	2	1	0	6	0	19	2	0	0
31	MF	(Thailand) Kaneung Buransook	9	0	2	1	1	0	12	1	1	0
32	FW	(Wales) Michael Byrne	10	4	2	1	1	0	13	5	5	0
33	DF	(Thailand) Chawarit Kheawcha-oum	2	0	1	0	2	0	5	0	0	0
34	MF	(Thailand) Piyapol Bantao	1	0	2	0	0	0	3	0	0	0
35	FW	(Ivory Coast) Jean Benie	5	2	1	1	0	0	6	3	0	0
—	FW	(Thailand) Kraison Panjaroen	5	0	0	0	4	2	9	2	0	0
—	MF	(Thailand) Surat Sukha	12	0	0	0	5	0	17	1	4	1
—	—	Own goals	–	0	–	0	–	0	–	0	–	–

== Transfers ==
=== In ===
Date	Pos.	Name	From
2009	DF	(Thailand) Suree Sukha	(England) Manchester City
2009	DF	(Thailand) Kiatprawut Saiwaeo	(England) Manchester City
2009	MF	(Thailand) Adul Lahso	(Japan) Gainare Tottori
2009	DF	(Thailand) Chawarit Kheawcha-oum	(Thailand) Bangkok Bank
2009	MF	(Thailand) Attapong Nooprom	(Singapore) Tampines Rovers
2009	FW	(Brazil) Anderson	(Brazil) São José Esporte Clube
2009	DF	(Brazil) Douglas	(Brazil) Taboão da Serra
2009	DF	(Japan) Yoshiaki Maruyama	(Japan) AC Nagano Parceiro
2009	FW	(Brazil) Joílson	(Brazil) Mineiros Esporte Clube
2009	FW	(Wales) Michael Byrne	(Thailand) Nakhon Pathom
2009	MF	(Thailand) Kaneung Buransook	(Thailand) Samut Songkhram
2009	MF	(Thailand) Piyapol Bantao	(Thailand) Pattaya United
2009	FW	(Ivory Coast) Jean Benie	Free agent

=== Out ===
Date	Pos.	Name	To
2009	DF	(Thailand) Nattaporn Phanrit	(Thailand) Muangthong United
2009	FW	(Thailand) Watcharapong Mak-klang	(Thailand) Sriracha
2009	DF	(Thailand) Phaisan Pona	(Thailand) Pattaya United
2009	MF	(Thailand) Nikorn Anuwan	(Thailand) Pattaya United
2009	DF	(Thailand) Udorn Pimpak	(Thailand) Navy
2009	MF	(Thailand) Nahathai Suksombat	(Thailand) Bangkok Glass
2009	FW	(Thailand) Kraison Panjaroen	(Thailand) Bangkok United
2009	MF	(Thailand) Surat Sukha	(Australia) Melbourne Victory

=== Loan in ===
Date	Pos.	Name	To

=== Loan out ===
Date	Pos.	Name	To
2009	MF	(Thailand) Attapong Nooprom	(Thailand) Sriracha
2009	MF	(Thailand) Phuritad Jarikanon	(Thailand) Thai Airways-Ban Bueng
2009	FW	(Brazil) Anderson	(Thailand) Pattaya United
2009	DF	(Brazil) Douglas	(Thailand) Sriracha
