= List of Chonburi F.C. players =

Below is a list of notable footballers who have played for Chonburi.

== List of players ==
Name	Nationality	Position	Chonburi career	Appearances	Goals
Adul Lahso	Thailand	MF	2004–2007; 2009–2015 2020		
Anderson de Freitas Machado	Brazil	ST	2009		
Kanu	Brazil	DF	2012–2016		
Arthit Sunthornpit	Thailand	W	2004–2013		
Badra Ali Sangaré	Ivory Coast	GK	2006–2007		
Berlin Ndebe-Nlome	(Cameroon)	ST	2010–2011		
Chawarit Kheawcha-oum	Thailand	LB	2009–2010		
Cholratit Jantakam	Thailand	CB	2004–2019		
Daiki Higuchi	Japan	LB	2011		
Darko Rakočević	(Serbia)	CB	2011–2012		
Douglas Felipe Moreira Cobo	Brazil	CB	2009		
Ekaphan Inthasen	Thailand	ST	2007–2011		
Esparza Anthony	France	ST	2011		
Fodé Bangaly Diakité	Ivory Coast	LB	2006; 2012-2014		
Goore Landry Romeo	Ivory Coast	ST	2006–2007		
Jean Marc Benie	Ivory Coast	ST	2009–2010		
Jetsadakorn Hemdaeng	Thailand	RW	2006–2013		
Jules Baga	(Cameroon)	ST	2008; 2010		
Kazuto Kushida	Japan	MF	2011–2015 2020		
Kafoumba Coulibaly	Ivory Coast	MF	2005–2006		
Kaneung Buransook	Thailand	W	2009		
Kenneth Akpueze	(Nigeria)	CB	2010–2011		
Kiatprawut Saiwaeo	Thailand	CB	2005–2007; 2009–2013		
Kone Hamed	Ivory Coast	MF	2005–2006		
Kraison Panjaroen	Thailand	ST	2007–2009		
Kriangkhai Pimrat	Thailand	MF	2006–2011		
Michael Byrne	Wales	AM	2009–2010		
Mohamed Koné	Ivory Coast	ST	2007–2009		
Nahathai Suksombat	Thailand	MF	2008		
Nattaporn Phanrit	Thailand	CB	2007-2008		
Natthaphong Samana	Thailand	LB	2007–2014		
Ney Fabiano	Brazil	ST	2008; 2010-2011		
Nikorn Anuwan	Thailand	MF	2007–2008		
Phaisan Pona	Thailand	CB	2004–2008; 2010-2011		
Phanuwat Jinta	Thailand	MF	2006–2013		
Phuritad Jarikanon	Thailand	MF	2007–2011; 2015–		
Pipob On-Mo	Thailand	ST	2005–		
Premwut Wongdee	Thailand	FW	2009		
Sakkongpob Sookprasert	Thailand	GK	2002–2008		
Sarawut Janthapan	Thailand	AM	2007–2011		
Surat Sukha	Thailand	MF	2006–2009		
Suree Sukha	Thailand	RB	2001–2007; 2008–2012		
Sinthaweechai Hathairattanakool	Thailand	GK	2007–		
Sujin Naknayom	Thailand	GK	2004–2012		
Suttinan Phuk-hom	Thailand	CB	2008–		
Tana Chanabut	Thailand	W	2008		
Teerasak Po-on	Thailand	AM	2006–2009		
Therdsak Chaiman	Thailand	AM	2010–		
Udorn Pimpak	Thailand	MF	2007–2008		
Vladimir Ribić	(Serbia)	FW	2011		
Watcharapong Mak-klang	Thailand	ST	2007–2008		
Worrawoot Srimaka	Thailand	ST	2007		
Yoshiaki Maruyama	Japan	CB	2009-2010		

[2] [3]

== Key to positions ==
GK	Goalkeeper	RB	Right back	RW	Right winger	DF	Defender
IF	Inside Forward	LB	Left back	LW	Left winger	CB	Centre Back
FW	Forward	FB	Fullback	W	Winger	MF	Midfielder
ST	Striker	HB	Half back	AM	Attacking Midfielder	CM	Central Midfielder
