= 2010 Thai FA Cup final =

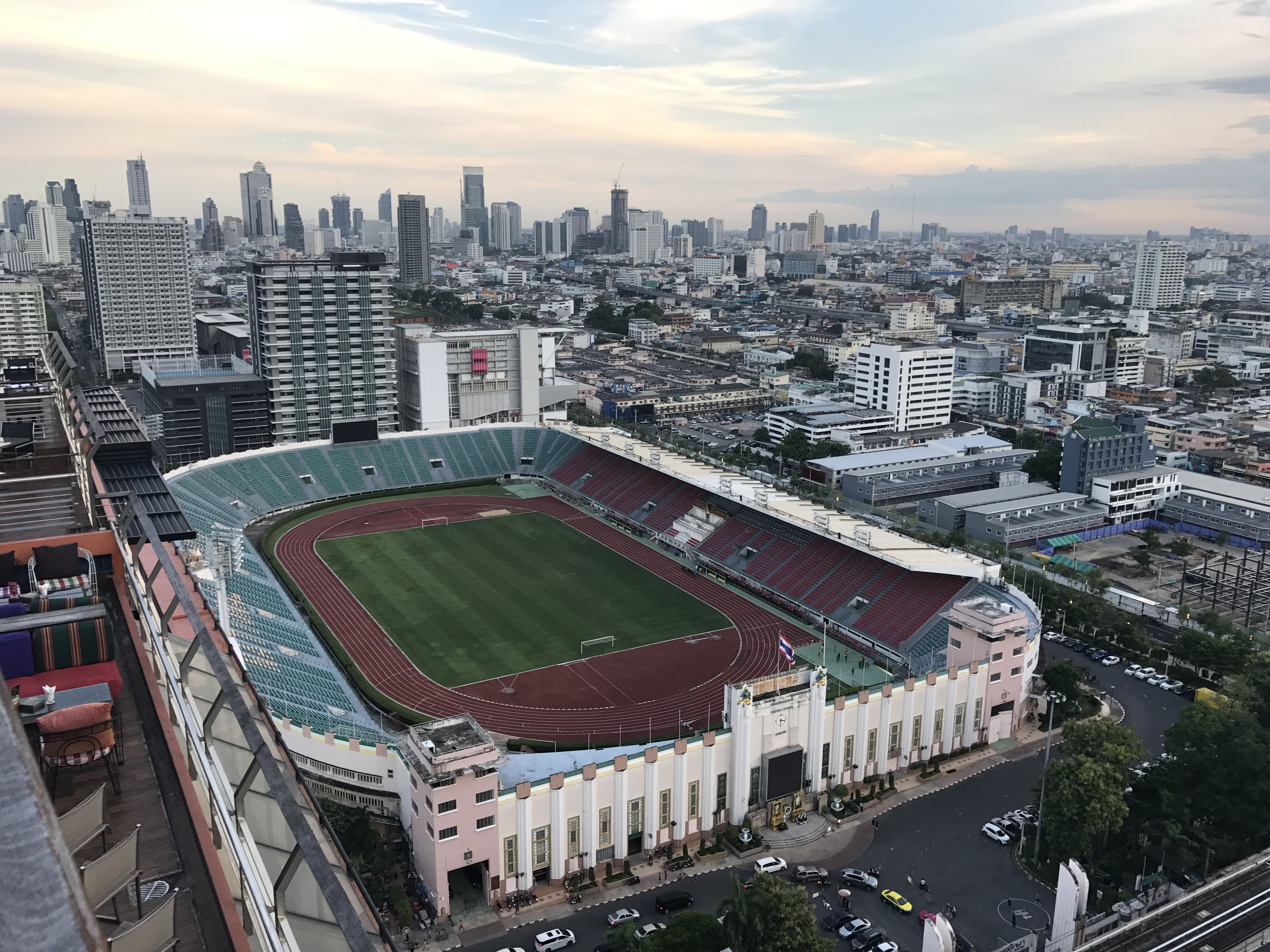
- The match took place at Supachalasai Stadium.
| Muangthong United | Chonburi |
| 1 | 2 |
- After Extra Time
- Date: 28 November 2010
- Venue: Suphachalasai Stadium, Bangkok
- Man of the Match: Pipob On-Mo
- Referee: Sura Sriart

The 2010 Thai FA Cup final was the 17th final of the Thailand's domestic football cup competition, the FA Cup. The final was played at Suphachalasai Stadium in Bangkok on 28 November 2010. The match was contested by Muangthong United, who beat Rajnavy Rayong 1–0 in their semi-final, and Chonburi who beat Royal Thai Army 2–0 in the match. After Therdsak Chaiman opened the scoring in 44th minute, Datsakorn Thonglao equalised in the 59th minute before the draw and Chonburi beat Muangthong United at the extra time 2–1 by Pipob On-Mo.

== Road to the final ==
Note: In all results below, the score of the finalist is given first (H: home; A: away; TPL: Clubs from Thai Premier League; D1: Clubs from Thai Division 1 League; D2: Clubs from Regional League Division 2).

| Muangthong United (TPL) | | Round | Chonburi (TPL) | |
|---|---|---|---|---|
| Opponent | Result | Knockout 1 leg | Opponent | Result |
| Ban Beung-Nawa nakhon (D2) | 11–0 (H) | Round of 32 | Samut Sakhon (D2) | 1–0 (H) |
| Air Force United (D1) | 4–0 (H) | Round of 16 | Samut Songkhram (TPL) | 4–1 (H) |
| Raj Pracha-Nonthaburi (D1) | 4–0 (H) | Quarter-finals | Pattaya United (TPL) | 2–0 (A) |
| Rajnavy Rayong (TPL) | 1–0 (A) | Semi-finals | Royal Thai Army (TPL) | 2–0 (A) |

== Match ==
=== Details ===
28 November 2010
16:00 UTC+7

| Muangthong United | 1 – 2 (a.e.t.) | Chonburi |
|---|---|---|
| Datsakorn 59' | | Therdsak 44'; Pipob 120' |

Suphachalasai Stadium, Bangkok
Referee: Sura Sriart

| Muangthong United | Chonburi |

MUANGTHONG UNITED:
| GK | 1 | (Thailand) Thanongsak Panpipat |
| DF | 8 | (Thailand) Jakkraphan Kaewprom |
| DF | 4 | (Thailand) Panupong Wongsa | Booked | (substituted off) 53' |
| DF | 6 | (Thailand) Nattaporn Phanrit (c) |
| DF | 11 | (Thailand) Piyachart Tamaphan |
| MF | 18 | (Thailand) Naruphol Ar-Romsawa | | (substituted off) 45' |
| MF | 7 | (Thailand) Datsakorn Thonglao |
| MF | 21 | (Ivory Coast) Dagno Siaka |
| MF | 19 | (Thailand) Pichitphong Choeichiu |
| FW | 10 | (Thailand) Teerasil Dangda |
| FW | 9 | (Thailand) Ronnachai Rangsiyo | | (substituted off) 25' |
Substitutes:
| DF | 3 | (Thailand) Prakasit Sansook |
| DF | 5 | (Thailand) Jetsada Jitsawad | | (substituted on) 53' |
| DF | 16 | (Thailand) Paitoon Nontadee |
| DF | 35 | (Thailand) Weerawut Kayem |
| MF | 20 | (Thailand) Amorn Thammanarm | | (substituted on) 45' |
| MF | 23 | (Thailand) Piyapol Bantao |
| MF | 28 | (Japan) Nobuyuki Zaizen |
| MF | 34 | (Ivory Coast) Khallil Lambin |
| FW | 22 | (Ivory Coast) Koné Mohamed | | (substituted on) 25' |
Manager:
(Belgium) René Desaeyere

CHONBURI:
| GK | 18 | (Thailand) Sinthaweechai Hathairattanakool |
| DF | 29 | (Thailand) Jetsadakorn Hemdaeng |
| DF | 25 | (Thailand) Cholratit Jantakam |
| DF | 6 | (Thailand) Suttinan Phuk-hom |
| DF | 3 | (Thailand) Natthaphong Samana |
| MF | 8 | (Thailand) Ekaphan Inthasen | | (substituted off) 115' |
| MF | 19 | (Thailand) Adul Lahso |
| MF | 13 | (Thailand) Therdsak Chaiman | | (substituted off) 72' |
| MF | 15 | (Thailand) Phuritad Jarikanon |
| MF | 7 | (Thailand) Arthit Sunthornpit | (yellow card) 35' | (substituted off) 67' |
| FW | 10 | (Thailand) Pipob On-Mo (c) | (yellow card) 97' |
Substitutes:
| GK | 16 | (Thailand) Sujin Naknayom |
| DF | 23 | (Thailand) Phaisan Pona |
| DF | 34 | (Thailand) Noppanon Kachaplayuk |
| MF | 5 | (Thailand) Phanuwat Jinta | | (substituted on) 67' |
| MF | 16 | (Canada) Dave Simpson |
| MF | 17 | (Thailand) Kriangkhai Pimrat |
| MF | 39 | (Thailand) Suphasek Kaikaew | | (substituted on) 115' |
| FW | 9 | (Cameroon) Jules Baga | | (substituted on) 72' |
| FW | 21 | (Thailand) Sukree Etae |
Manager:
(Thailand) Jadet Meelarp

Assistant referees:
Thaweep Inkaew
Surasak Kundiloksirodom
Fourth official:
Prathan Nasawang

Match Rules

- 90 minutes.
- 30 minutes of extra-time if necessary.
- Penalty shootout if scores still level.
- Nine named substitutes
- Maximum of 3 substitutions.
