= 2012 Chonburi F.C. season =

Chonburi
2012 season
- Chairman: Wittaya Khunpluem
- Manager: Withaya Laohakul
- AFC Champions League: Qualifying play-off
- AFC Cup: Semi-finals
- Top goalscorer: League: Pipob On-Mo; All: Pipob On-Mo

The 2012 season was Chonburi's 7th season consecutive season in the top division of Thai football. Chonburi will also be competing in the 2012 AFC Cup after losing the qualifying play-off for the 2012 AFC Champions League.

== Players ==
=== First team squad ===
As of July 20, 2012 Note: Flags indicate national team as defined under FIFA eligibility rules; some limited exceptions apply. Players may hold more than one non-FIFA nationality.

No.	Pos.	Nation	Player
1	GK	THA	Sujin Naknayom
2	DF	THA	Suree Sukha
3	MF	THA	Natthaphong Samana
4	DF	THA	Kiatprawut Saiwaeo
5	MF	THA	Phanuwat Jinta
6	DF	THA	Suttinan Phuk-hom
7	MF	THA	Arthit Sunthornpit
8	MF	THA	Therdsak Chaiman (vice-captain)
9	FW	TOG	Thomas Dossevi
10	FW	THA	Pipob On-Mo (captain)
11	DF	THA	Anucha Kitpongsri
14	MF	FRA	Geoffrey Doumeng
15	DF	CIV	Fodé Bangaly Diakité
18	GK	THA	Sinthaweechai Hathairattanakool

No.	Pos.	Nation	Player
19	MF	THA	Adul Lahso
21	FW	THA	Sukree Etae
22	MF	JPN	Kazuto Kushida
23	MF	THA	Apirat Heemkhao
25	DF	THA	Cholratit Jantakam
26	DF	BRA	Kanu
28	GK	THA	Hatsachai Sankla
29	DF	THA	Jetsadakorn Hemdaeng
31	FW	THA	Nurul Sriyankem
33	FW	THA	Akarawin Sawasdee
34	DF	THA	Noppanon Kachaplayuk
35	DF	THA	Putthinan Wannasri
36	MF	KOR	Jeon Kwang-Jin
37	FW	BRA	Thiago Cunha

Note: The official club website lists the supporters as player 12th man.

== Competitions ==
=== Premier League ===
==== League table ====
Pos	Team	Pld	W	D	L	GF	GA	GD	Pts	Qualification or relegation
1	Muangthong United (C)	34	25	9	0	78	31	+47	84	2013 AFC Champions League Group stage
2	Chonburi	34	21	7	6	65	33	+32	70	
3	BEC Tero Sasana	34	16	9	9	53	43	+10	57	
4	Buriram United	34	14	12	8	60	40	+20	54	2013 AFC Champions League Qualifying play-off (Note: Buriram United qualified for the 2013 AFC Champions League as winners of the 2012 Thai FA Cup.)
5	Osotspa Saraburi	34	16	4	14	55	48	+7	52	

Updated to match(es) played on 28 October 2012. Source: Thai Premier League
Rules for classification: 1st points; 2nd head-to-head (only match result, not used aggregate); 3rd match win; 4th goal difference; 5th goals scored.
(C) Champions

==== Matches ====
17 March 2012 Week 1	Chonburi	4 - 0	Thai Port	Chonburi Stadium
		Report

=== FA Cup ===
Team 1	Score	Team 2
1 August 2012
Buriram United	3 - 2	Chonburi

=== League Cup ===
==== First round ====
Team 1	Score	Team 2
9 June 2012
Nakhon Si Thammarat	0 - 1	Chonburi

==== Second round ====
Team 1	Score	Team 2
11 July 2012
Phetchaburi	0 - 4	Chonburi

==== Third round ====
Team 1	Score	Team 2
22 August 2012
Customs United	0 - 2	Chonburi

==== Quarter-finals ====
Team 1	Agg.	Team 2	1st leg	2nd leg	1st leg on 5 September 2012 & 2nd leg on 12 September 2012
Bangkok Glass		Chonburi	1-0	1-1	

=== AFC Champions League ===
18 February 2012 Qualifying play-off	Pohang Steelers (South Korea)	2 – 0	(Thailand) Chonburi	Pohang Steel Yard, Pohang
15:30 UTC+09:00	Hwang Jin-Sung 28'; Park Sung-Ho 70'	Report		Attendance: 5,344; Referee: Peter Green (Australia)

=== AFC Cup ===
Team	Pld	W	D	L	GF	GA	GD	Pts	CHO	HOM	CIT	YAN
(Thailand) Chonburi	6	4	2	0	10	5	+5	14		1–0	2–0	1–0
(Singapore) Home United	6	3	1	2	9	6	+3	10	1–2		3–1	3–1
(Hong Kong) Citizen	6	2	1	3	9	12	−3	7	3–3	1–2		2–1
(Myanmar) Yangon United	6	0	2	4	4	9	−5	2	1–1	0–0	1–2	

Legend: Blue = home team win; Yellow = draw; Red = away team win.

7 March 2012 Group G	Yangon United (Myanmar)	1 – 1	(Thailand) Chonburi	Thuwunna Stadium, Yangon
15:30 UTC+06:30	Jovanović 41'	Report	Sukree 90+3'	Attendance: 5,500; Referee: Fan Qi (China P.R.)

21 March 2012 Group G	Chonburi (Thailand)	1 - 0	(Singapore) Home United	Chonburi Municipality Stadium, Chonburi
19:00 UTC+07:00	Takam 69'	Report		Attendance: 5,128; Referee: Jumpei Iida (Japan)

3 April 2012 Group G	Chonburi (Thailand)	2 - 0	(Hong Kong) Citizen	Chonburi Municipality Stadium, Chonburi
19:00 UTC+07:00	Chaiman 49' (pen.); Diakité 60'	Report		Attendance: 4,364; Referee: Pratap Singh (India)

11 April 2012 Group G	Citizen (Hong Kong)	3 - 3	(Thailand) Chonburi	Mong Kok Stadium, Hong Kong
20:00 UTC+08:00	Nakamura 8'; Chiu Chun Kit 90+1'; Sham Kwok Fai 90+4'	Report	Samana 20'; On-Mo 69'; Etae 88'	Attendance: 1,210; Referee: Akbar Bakhshi Zadeh (Iran)

24 April 2012 Group G	Chonburi (Thailand)	1 - 0	(Myanmar) Yangon United	Chonburi Municipality Stadium, Chonburi
19:00 UTC+07:00	Chaiman 63'	Report		Attendance: 5,148; Referee: Vladislav Tseytlin (Uzbekistan)

8 May 2012 Group G	Home United (Singapore)	1 - 2	(Thailand) Chonburi	Bishan Stadium, Singapore
19:30 UTC+08:00	Daud 86'	http://www.the-afc.com/en/afc-cup-2012-schedule-results?fixtureid=6087&stageid=229&tMode=H&view=ajax&show=matchsummary Report]	On-Mo 5'; Kachaplayuk 77'	Attendance: 1,393; Referee: Hiroyoshi Takayama (Japan)

==== Knockout stage ====
22 May 2012
19:00 UTC+07:00

Chonburi (Thailand)	1 – 0	(Iraq) Al-Zawra'a
On-Mo 8'	Report

Chonburi Municipality Stadium, Chonburi
Attendance: 5,695
Referee: Liu Kwok Man (Hong Kong)

==== Quarter-finals ====
18 September 2012
19:00 UTC+07:00

Chonburi (Thailand)	1 – 2	(Syria) Al-Shorta
Thiago Cunha 3'	Report	Jafal 39'; Geílson 44'

Chonburi Municipality Stadium, Chonburi
Attendance: 5,818
Referee: Kim Sang-Woo (Korea Republic)
26 September 2012
16:00 UTC+03:00

Al-Shorta (Syria)	2 – 4 (a.e.t.)	(Thailand) Chonburi
Jafal 53' (pen.); Ghalioum 93'	Report	On-Mo 36'; Thiago Cunha 38', 111', 119'

Prince Mohammed Stadium, Zarqa (Jordan)^{2}
Attendance: 200
Referee: Saeid Mozaffarizadeh (Iran)

Chonburi won 5–4 on aggregate.
