= Chonburi F.C. in Asian football =

Chonburi Football Club is a Thai football club based in Chonburi. The club was founded in 1997 and has competed in the Thai football league system since 2002. They entered the first AFC Champions League in 2008, and entered the first AFC Cup in 2009.

== History ==
=== First Champions League ===
Chonburi played in the first AFC Champions League in 2008, drawn against Japanese champions Gamba Osaka. On March 20, 2008 the club achieved its first victory in the AFC Champions League against the highly fancied Melbourne Victory. The game was clouded by controversy when Melbourne Victory scored their only goal whilst a Chonburi FC player was down injured and his teammates were calling for the ball to be played off the park. It mattered little when Cameroonian striker Baga scored a goal from 35 yards out and then followed it up with a second goal in extra time to condemn the Melbourne Victory to their first loss in the competition 3-1.

== Matches ==
=== 2008 AFC Champions League ===
Team	Pld	W	D	L	GF	GA	GD	Pts
(Japan) Gamba Osaka	6	4	2	0	14	8	6	14
(Australia) Melbourne Victory	6	2	1	3	10	11	−1	7
(South Korea) Chunnam Dragons	6	1	3	2	8	10	−2	6
(Thailand) Chonburi	6	1	2	3	7	10	−3	5

2008-03-12

Gamba Osaka (Japan)	1 – 1	(Thailand) Chonburi
Lucas 90+4'	Report	Arthit 59'

Osaka Expo '70 Stadium, Suita
Attendance: 7,000
Referee: Hedayat Mombeni (Iran)

2008-03-19

Chonburi (Thailand)	3 – 1	(Australia) Melbourne Victory
Ney Fabiano 45'; Baga 79' 90+5'	Report	Allsopp 57'

Suphachalasai Stadium, Bangkok
Attendance: 10,000
Referee: Kadhum Auda (Iraq)

2008-04-09

Chunnam Dragons (South Korea)	1 – 0	(Thailand) Chonburi
Simões 90'	Report

Gwang-Yang Stadium, Gwangyang
Attendance: 500
Referee: Abdullah Mohamed Al Hilali (Oman)

2008-04-23

Chonburi (Thailand)	2 – 2	(South Korea) Chunnam Dragons
Pipob 56'; Panuwat 88'	Report	Chung Joon-Yeon 5'; Kim Myung-Woon 48'

Suphachalasai Stadium, Bangkok
Attendance: 10,000
Referee: Hai Tan (China PR)

2008-05-07

Chonburi (Thailand)	0 – 2	(Japan) Gamba Osaka
	Report	Yamazaki 64'; Lucas 76'

Suphachalasai Stadium, Bangkok
Attendance: 10,000
Referee: Abdulrahman Abdou (Qatar)

2008-05-21

Melbourne Victory (Australia)	3 – 1	(Thailand) Chonburi
Muscat 56'; Thompson 65'; Hernández 77'	Report	Ney Fabiano 55'

Telstra Dome, Melbourne
Attendance: 9,558
Referee: Salem Mahmoud Mujghef (Jordan)

=== 2009 AFC Cup ===
Team	Pld	W	D	L	GF	GA	GD	Pts
(Thailand) Chonburi	6	5	0	1	17	4	+13	15
(Malaysia) Kedah	6	2	1	3	14	10	+4	7
(Hong Kong) Eastern	6	2	1	3	9	13	−4	7
(Vietnam) Hanoi ACB	6	2	0	4	6	19	−13	6

	CHO	EAS	HAN	KED
Chonburi		4–1	6–0	3–1
Eastern	2–1		3–0	3–3
Hanoi ACB	0–2	3–0		3–1
Kedah	0–1	2–0	7–0	

March 10
18:30 UTC+7

Chonburi (Thailand)	4 – 1	(Hong Kong) Eastern
Panjaroen 8'; Mohamed 45'; On-Mo 56'; Jinta 76'	Report	Wong Chun Yue 56'

Suphachalasai Stadium, Bangkok
Attendance: 3,000
Referee: (Lebanon) Andre El Haddad

March 17
20:45 UTC+8

Kedah (Malaysia)	0 – 1	(Thailand) Chonburi
	Report	Mohamed 31'

Darul Aman Stadium, Kedah
Attendance: 4,500
Referee: (China) Zhao Liang

April 7
17:00 UTC+7

Hanoi ACB (Vietnam)	0 – 2	(Thailand) Chonburi
	Report	Sunthornpit 52'; Inthasen 60'

Hàng Đẫy Stadium, Hanoi
Attendance: 2,000
Referee: (Japan) Hajime Matsuo

April 21
18:30 UTC+7

Chonburi (Thailand)	6 – 0	(Vietnam) Hanoi ACB
Jinta 15'; Mohamed 21'; On-Mo 45'; Sukha 65'; Anderson 68'; Panjaroen 90'	Report

Suphachalasai Stadium, Bangkok
Attendance: 3,278
Referee: (Iraq) Jahanbazi Yadollah

May 5
20:00 UTC+8

Eastern (Hong Kong)	2 – 1	(Thailand) Chonburi
Yang Xu 71'; Akosah 85'	Report	Inthasen 29'

Mong Kok Stadium, Hong Kong
Attendance: 575
Referee: (Chinese Taipei) Yu Ming-hsun

May 19
18:30 UTC+7

Chonburi (Thailand)	3 – 1	(Malaysia) Kedah
On-Mo 14', 40'; Douglas 85'	Report	Mohd Khyril Muhymeen 35'

Suphachalasai Stadium, Bangkok
Attendance: 1,500
Referee: (Maldives) Ali Saleem

Round of 16

June 23
18:30 UTC+7

Chonburi (Thailand)	4 – 0	(Indonesia) PSMS Medan
Mohamed 19' 67' 90+3'; Inthasen 87'	Report

Rajamangala Stadium, Bangkok
Attendance: 6,000
Referee: (United Arab Emirates) Almarzouqi Hassan

Quarter-finals

2009-09-15
18:30 UTC+7

Chonburi (Thailand)	2 – 2	(Vietnam) Bình Dương
On-Mo 20'; Sunthornpit 70'	Report	Thanh 14'; Vũ Phong 24'

Rajamangala Stadium, Bangkok
Attendance: 4,500
Referee: (Bangladesh) Hasan Tayeb

2009-09-30
18:00 UTC+7

Bình Dương (Vietnam)	2 – 0	(Thailand) Chonburi
Philani 57'; Molina 86'	Report

Gò Đậu Stadium, Thủ Dầu Một
Attendance: 24,000
Referee: Peter Green (Australia)

Bình Dương won 4–2 on aggregate.

=== 2011 AFC Cup ===
Team	Pld	W	D	L	GF	GA	GD	Pts
(Thailand) Chonburi	6	4	1	1	18	8	+10	13
(Indonesia) Persipura Jayapura	6	3	2	1	14	9	+5	11
(Hong Kong) South China	6	1	2	3	7	14	−7	5
(India) Kingfisher East Bengal	6	0	3	3	9	17	−8	3

2 March 2011
17:00 UTC+05:30

Kingfisher East Bengal (India)	4 – 4	(Thailand) Chonburi
Ozbey 8', 22'; Sahni 74'; R. Singh 82' (pen.)	Report	Pipob 29', 47'; Adul 43'; Ekaphan 53'

Salt Lake Stadium, Kolkata
Attendance: 2,000
Referee: Hettikamkanamge Perera (Sri Lanka)

16 March 2011
19:00 UTC+07:00

Chonburi (Thailand)	3 – 0	(Hong Kong) South China
Natthaphong 27'; Therdsak 83' (pen.); Arthit 90+3'	Report

IPE Chonburi Stadium, Chonburi
Attendance: 6,500
Referee: Ibrahim Al-Hosni (Oman)

13 April 2011
16:00 UTC+09:00

Persipura Jayapura (Indonesia)	3 – 0	(Thailand) Chonburi
Pae 9'; Bonai 43'; Mandowen 83'	Report

Mandala Stadium, Jayapura
Attendance: 20,000
Referee: Yu Ming-hsun (Chinese Taipei)

26 April 2011
19:00 UTC+07:00

Chonburi (Thailand)	4 – 1	(Indonesia) Persipura Jayapura
Suree 16'; Pipob 36', 72'; Therdsak 42' (pen.)	Report	Paulin 75'

IPE Chonburi Stadium, Chonburi
Attendance: 6,821
Referee: Ryuji Sato (Japan)

3 May 2011
19:00 UTC+07:00

Chonburi (Thailand)	4 – 0	(India) Kingfisher East Bengal
Ney Fabiano 45+1'; Therdsak 49'; Pipob 51', 69'	Report

IPE Chonburi Stadium, Chonburi
Attendance: 6,897
Referee: Fan Qi (China P.R.)

10 May 2011
20:00 UTC+08:00

South China (Hong Kong)	0 – 3	(Thailand) Chonburi
	Report	Ney Fabiano 61'; Sukree 67', 73'

Hong Kong Stadium, Hong Kong
Attendance: 3,629
Referee: Strebre Delovski (Australia)

Round of 16

25 May 2011
19:00 UTC+07:00

Chonburi (Thailand)	3 – 0	(Indonesia) Sriwijaya
Ney Fabiano 18'; Therdsak 29' (pen.); Natthaphong 83'	Report

IPE Chonburi Stadium, Chonburi
Attendance: 6,954
Referee: Abdullah Al Hilali (Oman)

Quarter-finals

13 September 2011
19:00 UTC+07:00

Chonburi (Thailand)	0 – 1	(Uzbekistan) Nasaf Qarshi
	Report	Bošković 47'

IPE Chonburi Stadium, Chonburi
Attendance: 6,434
Referee: Hiroyoshi Takayama (Japan)

27 September 2011
19:00 UTC+05:00

Nasaf Qarshi (Uzbekistan)	0 – 1 (a.e.t.)	(Thailand) Chonburi
	Report	Ney Fabiano 54'
Penalties
Bošković (penalty scored); Turaev (penalty scored); Djiyamurodov (penalty scored); Otakuziyev (penalty scored); Gevorkyan (penalty missed)	4 – 3	(penalty missed) Ney Fabiano; (penalty scored) Phanuwat; (penalty scored) Suppasek; (penalty scored) Phaisan; (penalty missed) Therdsak

Markaziy Stadium, Qarshi
Attendance: 13,467
Referee: Muhsen Basma (Syria)

1–1 on aggregate; Nasaf Qarshi won on penalties.

All the matches was laid in Chonburi Municipality Stadium not IPE Stadium.

== Overall record ==
=== By competition ===
Competition	Pld	W	D	L	GF	GA	GD
Champions League	6	1	2	3	7	10	-3
AFC Cup	18	12	2	4	45	17	+28
Total	24	13	4	7	52	27	+25

=== By country ===
Country	Pld	W	D	L	GF	GA	GD
Australia	2	1	0	1	4	4	0
Japan	2	0	1	1	1	3	-3
Indonesia	4	3	0	1	11	4	+7
Hong Kong	4	3	0	1	11	3	+8
(South Korea) Korea Republic	2	0	1	1	2	3	-1
Malaysia	2	2	0	0	4	1	+3
Vietnam	4	2	1	1	10	4	+6
India	2	1	1	0	8	4	+4
Uzbekistan	2	1	0	1	1	1	0
