= List of Chonburi F.C. seasons =

This is a list of seasons played by Chonburi Football Club in Thai football, from 2002, when the club founded. This list details the club's achievements in all major competitions, and the top scorers for each season.

Chonburi is a football club from city of Chonburi established from the football club of Assumption College Sriracha. They first participated in the Football Cup. Later, the club was cooperated with Sannibat-Samutprakan (Division 1 team) and named as Chonburi-Sannibat-Samutprakan.

In the year 2002, The club joined the Thailand Provincial League in the name of Chonburi Code Red after separated from Sannibart Samutprakarn FC. The club had the nickname as The Sharks and changed their logo in 2003 season accordingly.

In 2005 they won the Provincial League title by beating Nakhon Ratchasima at the Central stadium, Nakhon Ratchasima, and moved to Thai League T1 in the 2006 season with the Provincial League runners up, Suphanburi. The shark tribes finished 8th place in the Thai League 2006 season.

In 2006 they were invited to play in the Singapore Cup and reached the final, defeating local sides Home United, Albirex Niigata and Balestier Khalsa along the way. In the final they lost to Tampines Rovers 2-3 in the extra time after leading 2-0.

In 2007 they were again invited to participate in the Singapore Cup, but were defeated in the first round against Balestier Khalsa, in a replay of the previous season's semi-finals. Chonburi lost 3-2 in normal play. They have formed links with Manchester City.

Chonburi played in the first AFC Champions League in 2008 with the drawn against Japanese champions Gamba Osaka. On March 20, 2008 the club achieved its first victory in the AFC Champions League against the highly fancied Melbourne Victory. The game was clouded by controversy when Melbourne Victory scored their only goal whilst a Chonburi FC player was down injured and his teammates were calling for the ball to be played off the park. It mattered little when Cameroonian striker Baga scored a goal from 35 yards out and then followed it up with a second goal in extra time to condemn the Melbourne Victory to their first loss in the competition 3-1.

== Seasons ==
Season	League									FA Cup	League Cup	Queen's Cup	Kor Royal Cup	Asia	Top goalscorer	
Season	Division	P	W	D	L	F	A	Pts	Pos	FA Cup	League Cup	Queen's Cup	Kor Royal Cup	Asia	Name	Goals
2002	PRO	10	5	3	2	17	12	18	2nd							
2003	PRO	22	12	5	5	62	30	41	3rd							
2004	PRO	18	5	6	7	27	26	21	6th							
2005	PRO	22	15	3	4	58	24	48	1st							
2006	TPL	22	5	12	5	29	28	27	8th			GR		Singapore Cup - RU	Pipob On-Mo	7
2007	TPL	30	19	6	5	50	25	63	1st				W	AFC Champions League - GR	Pipob On-Mo	16
2008	TPL	30	15	14	1	34	14	59	2nd				W		Tana Chanabut	6
2009	TPL	30	18	8	4	50	30	62	2nd	R4		SF	W	AFC Cup - QF	Mohamed Koné	14
2010	TPL	30	17	9	4	57	28	60	3rd	W	R2	SF			Pipob On-Mo; Therdsak Chaiman	10
2011	TPL	34	20	9	5	58	29	69	2nd	R5	SF	—	W	AFC Cup - QF	Pipob On-Mo	15
2012	TPL	34	21	7	6	65	33	70	2nd	R3	QF	—	W	AFC Champions League - QPO; AFC Cup - SF	Pipob On-Mo	14
2013	TPL	32	18	8	6	61	35	62	3rd	R3	QF	—	—	—	Thiago Cunha	13
2014	TPL	38	21	13	4	62	33	76	2nd	RU	R3	—	—	AFC Champions League - QPO R3	Thiago Cunha	20
2015	TPL	34	15	12	7	62	44	57	4th	QF	R3	—	—	AFC Champions League - QPO	Thiago Cunha	19
2016	T1	31	14	9	8	52	33	51	5th	W	R3	—	—	AFC Champions League - POR	Rodrigo Vergilio	12
2017	T1	34	15	8	11	59	59	53	7th	R1	R2	—	—	—	Renan Marques	27
2018	T1	34	13	7	14	45	53	46	9th	QF	QF	—	—	—	Worachit Kanitsribampen	12
2019	T1	30	11	7	12	43	45	40	7th	R1	R1	—	—	—	Lukian	11
2020–21	T1	30	9	5	16	30	47	32	12th	RU	—	—	—	—	Caion	6
2021–22	T1	30	12	8	10	50	40	44	7th	R2	SF	—	—	—	Yoo Byung-Soo	12
2022–23	T1	30	13	4	13	46	38	43	6th	R2	R1	—	—	—	Danilo Alves	14
2023–24	T1	30	7	9	14	33	52	30	14th	QF	R2	—	—	—	Willian Lira	15
2024–25	T2	32	19	6	7	56	30	63	1st	R2	R1	—	—	—	Derley	14

Champions	Runners-up	Third place	Promoted	Relegated

- P = Played
- W = Games won
- D = Games drawn
- L = Games lost
- F = Goals for
- A = Goals against
- Pts = Points
- Pos = Final position
- PRO = Provincial League
- TPL = Thai Premier League
- T1 = Thai League 1
- T2 = Thai League 2
- QR1 = First Qualifying Round
- QR2 = Second Qualifying Round
- QR3 = Third Qualifying Round
- QR4 = Fourth Qualifying Round
- QPO = Qualifying Play-off
- RInt = Intermediate Round
- POR = Play-off Round
- R1 = Round 1
- R2 = Round 2
- R3 = Round 3
- R4 = Round 4
- R5 = Round 5
- R6 = Round 6
- GR = Group Stage
- QF = Quarter-finals
- SF = Semi-finals
- RU = Runners-up
- S = Shared
- W = Winners
