= 2009 Kor Royal Cup =

PEA	Chonburi
0	1
- Date: 1 March 2009
- Venue: Suphachalasai Stadium, Bangkok
- Referee: Nittipoom Kunlabut
- Attendance: 9,058

The 2009 Kor Royal Cup was the 76th Kor Royal Cup, an annual football match contested by the winners and runners-up of the previous season's Thailand Premier League competitions. The match was contested at Suphachalasai Stadium, Bangkok, on 1 March 2009, and contested by 2008 Thailand Premier League champions Chonburi, and PEA as the winners of the 2008 Thailand Premier League. The game ended in a 1–0 winning for Chonburi – the goal coming from Suree Sukha.

== Match details ==
1 March 2009
17:00 UTC+7

PEA	0 – 1	Chonburi
		Suree 70'

Suphachalasai Stadium, Bangkok
Attendance: 9,058
Referee: Nittipoom Kunlabut

PEA	Chonburi

PEA:
GK	1	(Thailand) Umarin Yaodam
RB	22	(Thailand) Apichet Puttan (c)
CB	4	(Thailand) Panupong Wongsa
CB	15	(Cameroon) Henri Jöel
LB	7	(Thailand) Rangsan Viwatchaichok
RM	12	(Thailand) Apipoo Suntornpanavech	(yellow card) 55'
CM	17	(Thailand) Yuttajak Kornchan
CM	10	(Thailand) Narongchai Vachiraban
LM	13	(Thailand) Chaiwut Wattana
CF	20	(Laos) Lamnao Singto
CF	24	(Thailand) Sattrupai Sri-narong
Head coach:
(Thailand) Prapol Pongpanich

CHONBURI:
GK	18	(Thailand) Kosin Hathairattanakool
RB	2	(Thailand) Suree Sukha
CB	25	(Thailand) Cholratit Jantakam	(yellow card) 60'
CB	6	(Thailand) Suttinan Phuk-hom
LB	3	(Thailand) Natthaphong Samana
RM	24	(Thailand) Ekaphan Inthasen
CM	27	(Thailand) Surat Sukha
CM	5	(Thailand) Phanuwat Jinta
LM	7	(Thailand) Arthit Sunthornpit
CF	10	(Thailand) Pipob On-Mo (c)	(yellow card) 39'
CF	14	(Brazil) Anderson
Head coach:
(Thailand) Kiatisuk Senamuang

MATCH RULES

- 90 minutes.
- Penalty shoot-out if scores level after 90 minutes.
- Maximum of six substitutions.

== See also ==
- 2008 Thailand Premier League
