= Nikorn Anuwan =

Thai footballer (born 1978)

Personal information
- Full name: Nikorn Anuwan
- Date of birth: July 21, 1978 (age 48)
- Place of birth: Nakhon Phanom, Thailand
- Height: 1.66 m (5 ft 5 1/2 in)
- Position: Midfielder

Team information
- Current team: MNK (head coach)

Senior career*
Years	Team	Apps	(Gls)
2007–2008	Chonburi		
2009–2011	Pattaya United		
2012–2014	Samut Prakan United		

Managerial career
- 2016: Nakhon Mae Sot United
- 2016–2017: Rajapruk University
- 2026–: MNK
- * Club domestic league appearances and goals as of 22 June 2008

Nikorn Anuwan (Thai: นิกร อนุวรรณ, born April 26, 1978) is a Thai retired professional footballer who played as a midfielder who is currently the head coach of Thai League 3 club MNK.

== Club career ==
He played for Chonburi FC in the 2008 AFC Champions League group stages.

== Honours ==
=== Club ===
Chonburi

- Thai Premier League: 2007
- Kor Royal Cup: 2008
