= Chaiwut Wattana =

Thai footballer

Personal information
- Full name: Chaiwut Wattana
- Date of birth: July 14, 1981 (age 45)
- Place of birth: Chai Nat, Thailand
- Height: 1.75 m (5 ft 9 in)
- Position: Defensive midfielder

Senior career*
Years	Team	Apps	(Gls)
2007–2009	TOT	68	(4)
2009	PEA	7	(0)
2010	Chainat	19	(2)
2011–2013	Samut Songkhram	7	(0)
2013–2014	Bangkok United	15	(0)
2014	Air Force Central	5	(0)
2015–2016	Thai Honda	29	(2)
Total		150	(8)

International career
2008	Thailand	5	(0)
- * Club domestic league appearances and goals

Chaiwut Wattana (Thai: ชัยวุฒิ วัฒนะ, born July 14, 1981), simply known as Wut (Thai: วุฒิ), is a retired Thai professional footballer who played as a defensive midfielder.

== International career ==
In May, 2008 he played a friendly match against Nepal. Chaiwut has currently played 5 times for the full Thailand national team.

=== International ===
As of 27 March 2016

National team	Year	Apps	Goals
Thailand	2008	5	0
Thailand	Total	5	0
