= Jetsadakorn Hemdaeng =

Thai footballer (born 1986)

Personal information
- Full name: Jetsadakorn Hemdaeng
- Date of birth: 2 March 1986 (age 40)
- Place of birth: Ubon Ratchatani, Thailand
- Height: 1.73 m (5 ft 8 in)
- Position: Defender

Youth career
- 2004–2006: Chonburi

Senior career*
Years	Team	Apps	(Gls)
2006–2013	Chonburi	162	(3)
2012	→ Songkhla United (loan)	12	(0)
2014–2016	Bangkok Glass	65	(1)
2017	PTT Rayong	23	(0)
2018	Ubon United	16	(0)
2019	Simork	0	(0)
2019	Air Force United	11	(0)
2020–2021	Uthai Thani	15	(0)
2021–2022	Ubon Kruanapat	21	(2)
Total		325	(6)

International career
2009	Thailand U23	1	(0)
2012	Thailand	1	(0)
- * Club domestic league appearances and goals as of 2 November 2014

Jetsadakorn Hemdaeng (Thai: เจษฎากร เหมแดง), born March 2, 1986) simply known as Buaw is a Thai former professional footballer who plays as a right back.

== Club career ==
Jetsadakorn began his career with Chonburi. He played for Chonburi in the 2008 AFC Champions League group stages. In 2012, he was loaned to Wuachon United, after the second leg of the 2012 Thai Premier League he moved back to Chonburi.

At the end of the 2013 Thai Premier League he moved to Bangkok Glass, this is his first permanent move from Chonburi. On 30 November 2021, he was appointed as a manager of Ubon Kruanapat after joining the club in July 2021.

== International career ==
In 2012 Jetsadakorn debuted for Thailand against Bhutan in a friendly match.

=== International ===
As of 12 November 2015

National team	Year	Apps	Goals
Thailand	2012	1	0
Thailand	Total	1	0

== Honours ==
=== Clubs ===
Chonburi

- Thai Premier League (1): 2007
- Thai FA Cup (1): 2010
- Kor Royal Cup (3): 2007, 2009, 2011

Bangkok Glass

- Thai FA Cup (1): 2014
