= Joílson (footballer, born 1976) =

Brazilian footballer

Personal information
- Full name: Joílson Rodrigues da Silva
- Date of birth: December 8, 1976 (age 49)
- Place of birth: Arataca, Bahia, Brazil
- Height: 1.83 m (6 ft 0 in)
- Position: Midfielder

Senior career*
Years	Team	Apps	(Gls)
1997	Atlético Paranaense	5	(1)
- Iraty
- Botafogo
1999	Gama		
- Vasco
2000	Seongnam Ilhwa Chunma	27	(8)
- Marcílio Dias
- Remo
- Oeste
- Novo Hamburgo
- Brasil de Pelotas
- Mirassol
2005–2006	Zob Ahan	26	(8)
2006–2007	Esteghlal	11	(3)
2009	Chonburi		
2009	Vitória da Conquista		
2010	Itabuna		
- * Club domestic league appearances and goals

Joílson Rodrigues da Silva, referred to simply as Joílson (born December 8, 1976), is a former Brazilian football midfielder. He was born in Arataca, near Itabuna.

== Career ==
Defending Atlético Paranaense, he played five Campeonato Brasileiro Série A games in 1997, and scored one goal. In the same year, he played two Copa do Brasil games for Atlético Paranaense. In 1999, he played one Copa do Brasil game for Gama.
