= Chawarit Kheawcha-oum =

Thai footballer (born 1979)

Personal information
- Full name: Chawarit Kheawcha-oum
- Date of birth: January 16, 1979 (age 47)
- Place of birth: Samut Prakan, Thailand
- Height: 1.65 m (5 ft 5 in)
- Position: Left back

Senior career*
Years	Team	Apps	(Gls)
2004–2008	Bangkok Bank	107	(6)
2009–2010	Chonburi	5	(0)
2011	Customs United		
- * Club domestic league appearances and goals as of 14 November 2008

Chawarit Kheawcha-oum (Thai ชวฤทธิ์ เขียวชะอุ่ม) (born January 16, 1979, in Samut Prakan, Thailand) is a Thai retired footballer.

== Honours ==
International

- AFC U-17 Championship 1998 Winner with Thailand

Clubs

- Kor Royal Cup 2009 Winner with Chonburi FC
