= Watcharapong Mak-klang =

Thai footballer

Personal information
- Full name: Watcharapong Mak-klang
- Date of birth: June 13, 1985 (age 41)
- Place of birth: Nakhon Phanom, Thailand
- Height: 1.65 m (5 ft 5 in)
- Position: Striker

Team information
- Current team: Sriracha
- Number: 24

Senior career*
Years	Team	Apps	(Gls)
2005–2006	Sriracha	23	(9)
2007–2008	Chonburi	31	(4)
2009–present	Sriracha	7	(1)
- * Club domestic league appearances and goals as of 22 June 2008

Watcharapong Mak-klang (Thai วัชรพงษ์ มากกลาง ), (born June 13, 1985) is a Thai footballer. He plays for Thailand Premier League clubside Sriracha.

== Honours ==
Clubs

- Kor Royal Cup 2009 Winner with Chonburi
