= Adul Lahsoh =

Thai footballer (born 1986)

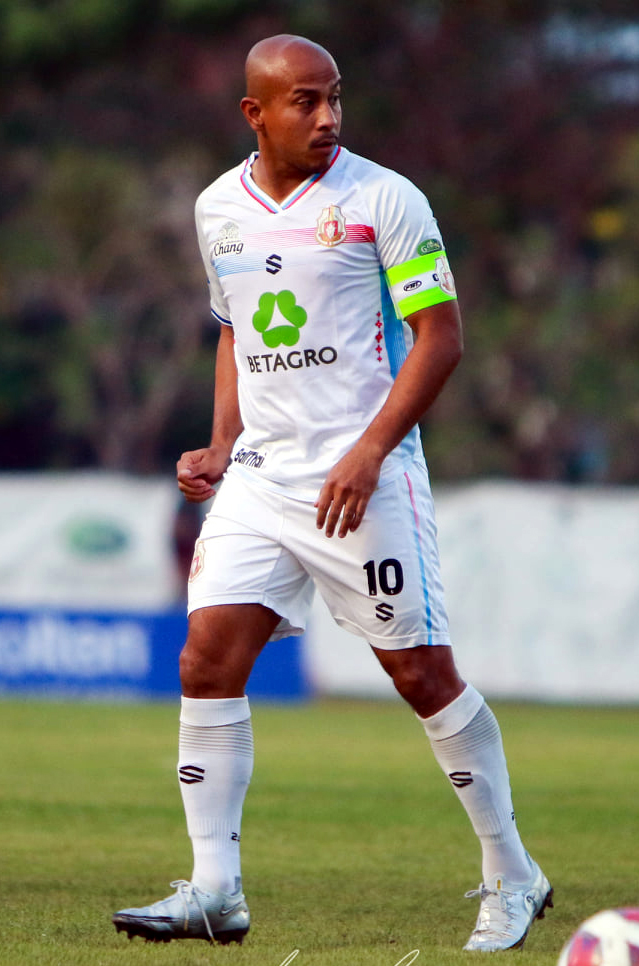
- Adul with Lamphun Warriors in 2022

Personal information
- Full name: Adul Lahsoh
- Date of birth: 19 September 1986 (age 40)
- Place of birth: Phatthalung, Thailand
- Height: 1.67 m (5 ft 6 in)
- Position: Defensive midfielder

Youth career
- 2001–2003: Chulabhon's College Chonburi

Senior career*
| Years | Team | Apps | (Gls) |
| 2004–2007 | Chonburi | 38 | (2) |
| 2008 | Gainare Tottori | 19 | (0) |
| 2009–2015 | Chonburi | 188 | (9) |
| 2016 | Buriram United | 5 | (0) |
| 2016 | → Chonburi (loan) | 13 | (0) |
| 2017–2019 | Suphanburi | 56 | (0) |
| 2020 | Chonburi | 4 | (0) |
| 2020–2022 | Lamphun Warrior | 15 | (0) |
| 2022 | Phitsanulok | 0 | (0) |
| Total | | 338 | (11) |

International career
| 2007–2009 | Thailand U23 | 8 | (1) |
| 2009–2016 | Thailand | 34 | (1) |

Managerial career
- 2022: Phitsanulok (player-manager)
- 2023: Chonburi (interim)
Medal record
Thailand under-23
Sea Games
| Gold medal – first place | Sea Games 2007 | Football |
Thailand
Asean Football Championship
| Silver medal – second place | AFF Suzuki Cup 2012 | 2012 |
| Winner | AFF Suzuki Cup 2014 | 2014 |
| Winner | AFF Suzuki Cup 2016 | 2016 |
- * Club domestic league appearances and goals

Adul Lahsoh (Thai: อดุล หละโสะ; RTGS: Adun Laso; born 19 September 1986), simply known as Dun (Thai: ดุล) is a Thai football manager and retired professional footballer.

== Personal life ==
Lahsoh was born on 19 September 1986, in the Phatthalung province. He is Muslim.

== Club career ==
His career began in the youth team Adul of Chonburi. In 2004, he received a contract for the first Team, for whom he played until 2007. During this time he completed a total of 38 games for the club. In his first three years in Chonburi, he managed the team to promotion to the Thai Premier League and became champions for the first time in 2007. 2006 also was with the club in the final of the Singapore Cup. He was followed, in 2008, his former coach Walter Jäger to Japan. There he played a season for Gainare Tottori in the JFL, before returning to Chonburi. On 6 December 2015 Buriram United announced that Lahsoh would join the club for the 2016 season after having spent 7 years at Chonburi.

=== Phitsanulok ===
In June 2022, it was announced that he joined Phitsanulok, as a Head coach and player.

== International career ==
Adul made his international appearance in 2007 with the U-23 squad which took part in the 2007 SEA Games and eventually won the gold medal. He also has played a game for the senior team. He was part of the 2012 AFF Suzuki Cup, 2013 King's Cup, 2014 FIFA World Cup qualification (AFC), and the 2015 AFC Asian Cup qualification.

Adul scored his first international goal on 19 December 2012 against Singapore at the Jalan Besar Stadium during the 2012 AFF Suzuki Cup.

In October 2013 he played a friendly match against Bahrain. On October 15, 2013 he played against Iran in the 2015 AFC Asian Cup qualification. He was named captain by then coach Kiatisuk Senamuang for the 2014 AFF Suzuki Cup. In May 2015, he was called up to play in the 2018 FIFA World Cup qualification (AFC) against Vietnam.

== International goals ==
| # | Date | Venue | Opponent | Score | Result | Competition |
|---|---|---|---|---|---|---|
| 1. | 19 December 2012 | Jalan Besar Stadium, Singapore | Singapore | 1–1 | 1–3 | 2012 AFF Suzuki Cup |

== Managerial statistics ==
As of match played 12 May 2023

Managerial record by team and tenure
| Team | From | To | Record | | | | | | | |
| Team | From | To | G | W | D | L | GF | GA | GD | Win % |
|---|---|---|---|---|---|---|---|---|---|---|
| Phitsanulok (player-manager) | 10 June 2022 | 4 December 2022 | 18 | 17 | 1 | 0 | 60 | 18 | +42 | 94.44 |
| Chonburi (interim) | 10 April 2023 | 13 May 2023 | 4 | 2 | 0 | 2 | 6 | 6 | +0 | 50.00 |
| Total | | | 22 | 19 | 1 | 2 | 66 | 24 | +42 | 86.36 |

== Honours ==
=== Club ===
Chonburi

- Thai Premier League (1): 2007
- Thai FA Cup (1): 2010
- Kor Royal Cup (3): 2009, 2011, 2012

Buriram United

- Kor Royal Cup (1): 2016

Lamphun Warriors

- Thai League 2 (1): 2021–22
- Thai League 3 (1): 2020–21

=== International ===
Thailand U-23

- Sea Games Gold Medal (1); 2007

Thailand

- ASEAN Football Championship (2): 2014, 2016
