= Sinthaweechai Hathairattanakool =

Thai footballer (born 1982)

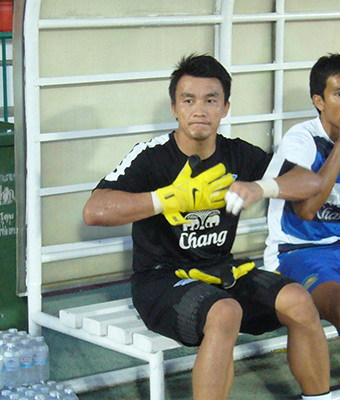
- Hathairattanakool in 2014

Personal information
- Full name: Sinthaweechai Hathairattanakool
- Birth name: Kosin Hathairattanakool
- Date of birth: 23 March 1982 (age 44)
- Place of birth: Sakon Nakhon, Thailand
- Height: 1.80 m (5 ft 11 in)
- Position: Goalkeeper

Youth career
- 1999–2002: Assumption Sriracha School

Senior career*
| Years | Team | Apps | (Gls) |
| 2002–2004 | Tobacco Monopoly | 61 | (1) |
| 2005 | Osotspa | 29 | (0) |
| 2006 | Persib Bandung | 33 | (0) |
| 2007–2015 | Chonburi | 315 | (0) |
| 2009 | → Persib Bandung (loan) | 11 | (0) |
| 2016–2019 | Suphanburi | 112 | (0) |
| 2019–2021 | Chonburi | 35 | (0) |
| 2021 | Muangkan United | 9 | (0) |
| 2022–2024 | Police Tero | 44 | (0) |
| 2024 | Chonburi | 0 | (0) |
| Total | | 649 | (1) |

International career
| 1998–1999 | Thailand U17 | 18 | (0) |
| 2000–2001 | Thailand U19 | 12 | (0) |
| 2002–2005 | Thailand U23 | 22 | (0) |
| 2003–2018 | Thailand | 85 | (0) |

Managerial career
- 2024: Chonburi (interim)
- 2025: Police Tero
- 2026–: Navy
Medal record
Thailand under-23
Southeast Asian Games
| Gold medal – first place | Sea Games 2003 | Football |
| Gold medal – first place | Sea Games 2005 | Football |
Thailand
Asean Football Championship
| Runner-up | AFF Suzuki Cup 2007 | 2007 |
| Runner-up | AFF Suzuki Cup 2008 | 2008 |
| Runner-up | AFF Suzuki Cup 2012 | 2012 |
| Winner | AFF Suzuki Cup 2016 | 2016 |
- * Club domestic league appearances and goals

Sinthaweechai Hathairattanakool (Thai: สินทวีชัย หทัยรัตนกุล; RTGS: Sinthawichai Hathairattanakun, born 23 March 1982), commonly called as Kosin Hathairattanakool (Thai: โกสินทร์ หทัยรัตนกุล) and nicknamed Tee (Thai: ตี๋), is a Thai professional football manager and former player.

== Club career ==
Born in Sakon Nakhon Province, Sinthaweechai spent his youth career at Assumption Sriracha School between 1999 and 2002. The young goalkeeper signed his first professional contract with a Thai Premier League club TTM Phichit (now TTM Chiangmai) in 2002, he spent 2 seasons with the club and won a league title in 2004–2005 season.

The former Thailand U23 international joined Osotsapa in 2005 before moving abroad to an Indonesian club, Persib Bandung in 2006.

In 2007, Sinthaweechai returned to Thailand, joined his local club Chonburi, and won the league title with The Sharks. Sinthaweechai also won Kor Royal Cup with the club in the next season, but failed to protect their league title from PEA. He also participated in the AFC Champions League with Chonburi in 2008 but the club was knocked out in the group stage.

Sinthaweechai rejoined Persib Bandung on a season loan in 2009.

After the loan spell with the Indonesian, Sinthaweechai returned to Chonburi and has been playing for the club regularly.

In December 2015 it was announced that Sinthaweechai would be joining Suphanburi for the 2016 season. The deal, which costs 15 million Thai baht broke the record as the most expensive domestic transfer in Thai football history.

After the 2023–24 Thai League 1, Sinthaweechai retired from professional football and took on the role of club manager at Chonburi.

== International career ==
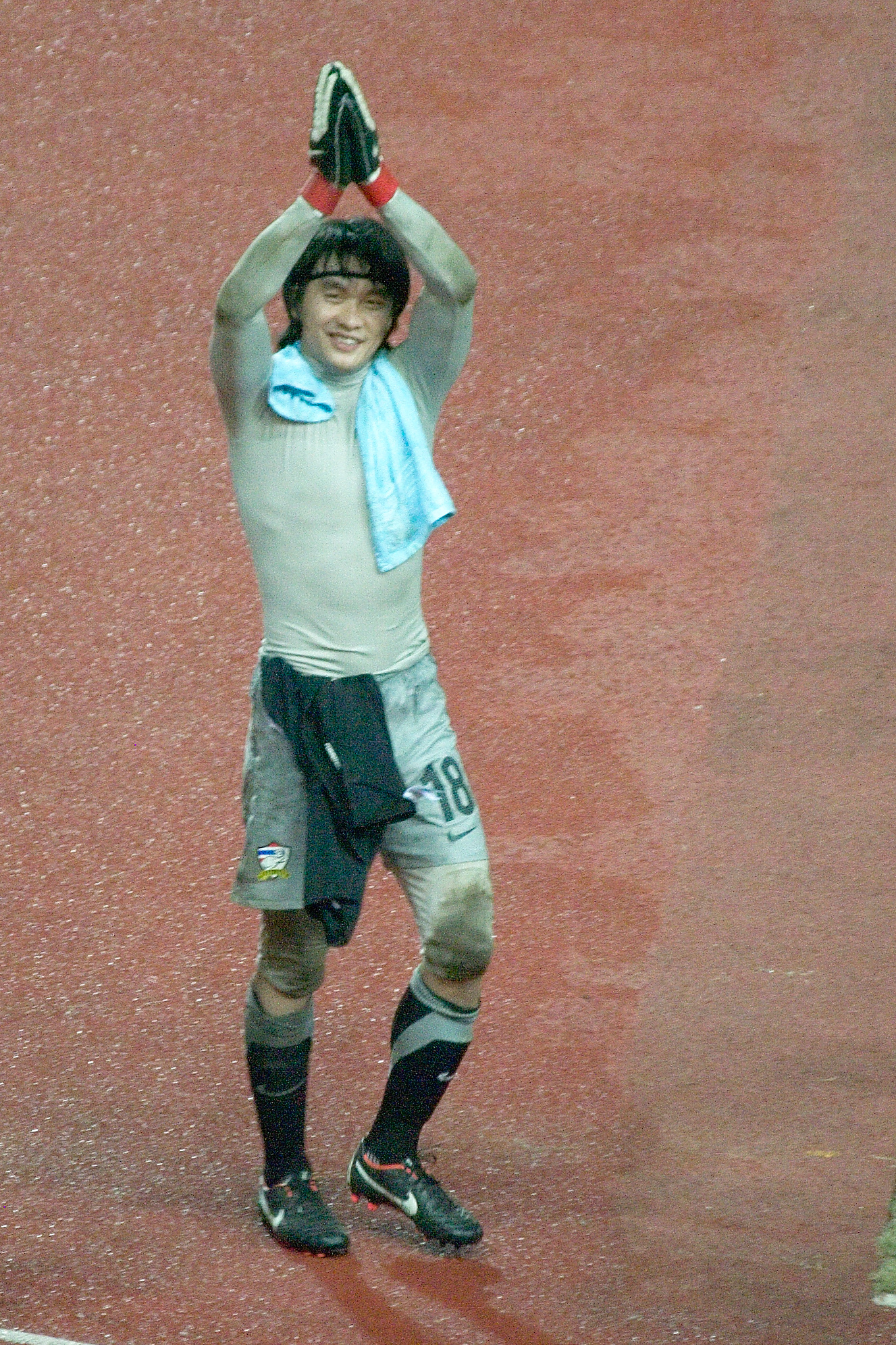
Sinthaweechai after a 2014 FIFA World Cup qualification (AFC) match against Oman in 2011

Sinthaweechai has been serving the country in almost every level; U17, U19, U23 and senior squad respectively. He was first called up for the U19 team between 2000 and 2001 but did not make much of recognition.

It was between 2002 and 2005 that the goalkeeper started to become public interest. He was called up for Thailand U23 in 2002 and since the U23 team participate many more competitions than the lower level, practically part of senior squad, he was given more chances and eventually earned no.1 status in the team.

He made totally 22 appearances for the U23 team between 2002 and 2005.

Sinthaweechai was promoted to the senior squad in 2004. However, he lost his no.1 status in numerous occasions as well, as he underperformed in matches. Sinthaweechai was also a member of the victorious T&T Cup 2008 winning squad. Anyway, under the management of Winfried Schafer, which was appointed as Thailand's head coach in July, 2011, Sinthaweechai firmly regained his first team regular in Thailand national team so far, especially in 2014 Asian World Cup Qualifying section which he earned many positive comments from the media and fans regarded to his performances against Australia.

He was part of Winfried Schäfer's 2012 AFF Suzuki Cup, but didn't play in the tournament because he got a fever. Sinthaweechai played a friendly match against China, and he was captain in that match.

In 2013, he was called up to the national team by Surachai Jaturapattarapong to the 2015 AFC Asian Cup qualification, he was chosen by the coach as captain. In October, 2013 Sinthaweechai started out as a captain for Thailand against Bahrain, in a friendly match. On October 15, 2013, he captained Thailand against Iran national football team in the 2015 AFC Asian Cup qualification.

In May 2015, he played for Thailand in the 2018 FIFA World Cup qualification (AFC) against Vietnam, he also kept a clean sheet in the following game.

On 5 September 2017, Sinthaweechai announced his early retirement from international football after the match with Australia in 2018 FIFA World Cup qualification – AFC third round. On 14 October 2018, Football Association of Thailand organised Sinthaweechai Testimonial Match with Trinidad and Tobago national football team at Suphan Buri Provincial Stadium, as part of FIFA Friendly schedule and ended with score 1–0 win for the Thais over Trinidad and Tobago, ending his national career covering 14 years and 79 match appearances.

== Style of play ==
Sinthaweechai is known as a sweeper keeper because of his speed when he rushes off his line to anticipate opponents who have beaten the offside trap. He made a name for himself by making a lung-busting run, covering almost halfway through the field, to intercept Vietnam striker Lê Công Vinh in Thailand's 1-0 victory over Vietnam during the 2018 FIFA World Cup qualification – AFC third round.

== Managerial statistics ==
As of match played 25 October 2025

Managerial record by team and tenure
| Team | From | To | Record | | | | | | | |
| Team | From | To | G | W | D | L | GF | GA | GD | Win % |
|---|---|---|---|---|---|---|---|---|---|---|
| Chonburi | 26 November 2024 | 27 December 2024 | 4 | 3 | 0 | 1 | 5 | 2 | +3 | 75.00 |
| Police Tero | 6 September 2025 | 28 October 2025 | 6 | 4 | 0 | 2 | 11 | 7 | +4 | 66.67 |
| Total | | | 10 | 7 | 0 | 3 | 16 | 9 | +7 | 70.00 |

== Honours ==
=== Club ===
Chonburi

- Thai Premier League (1): 2007
- Kor Royal Cup (4): 2008, 2011, 2012

=== International ===
Thailand U-23

- Sea Games Gold Medal (1); 2003, 2005

Thailand

- ASEAN Football Championship (1): 2016
- VFF Cup : 2008
- King's Cup (1): 2017

=== Individual ===
- Thai Premier League Goalkeeper of the Year (1): 2008
- Thai Premier League Player of the Month (1): July 2014
- Thai Premier League Player of the Year (1): 2011
