= Chonlatit Jantakam =

Thai footballer (born 1985)

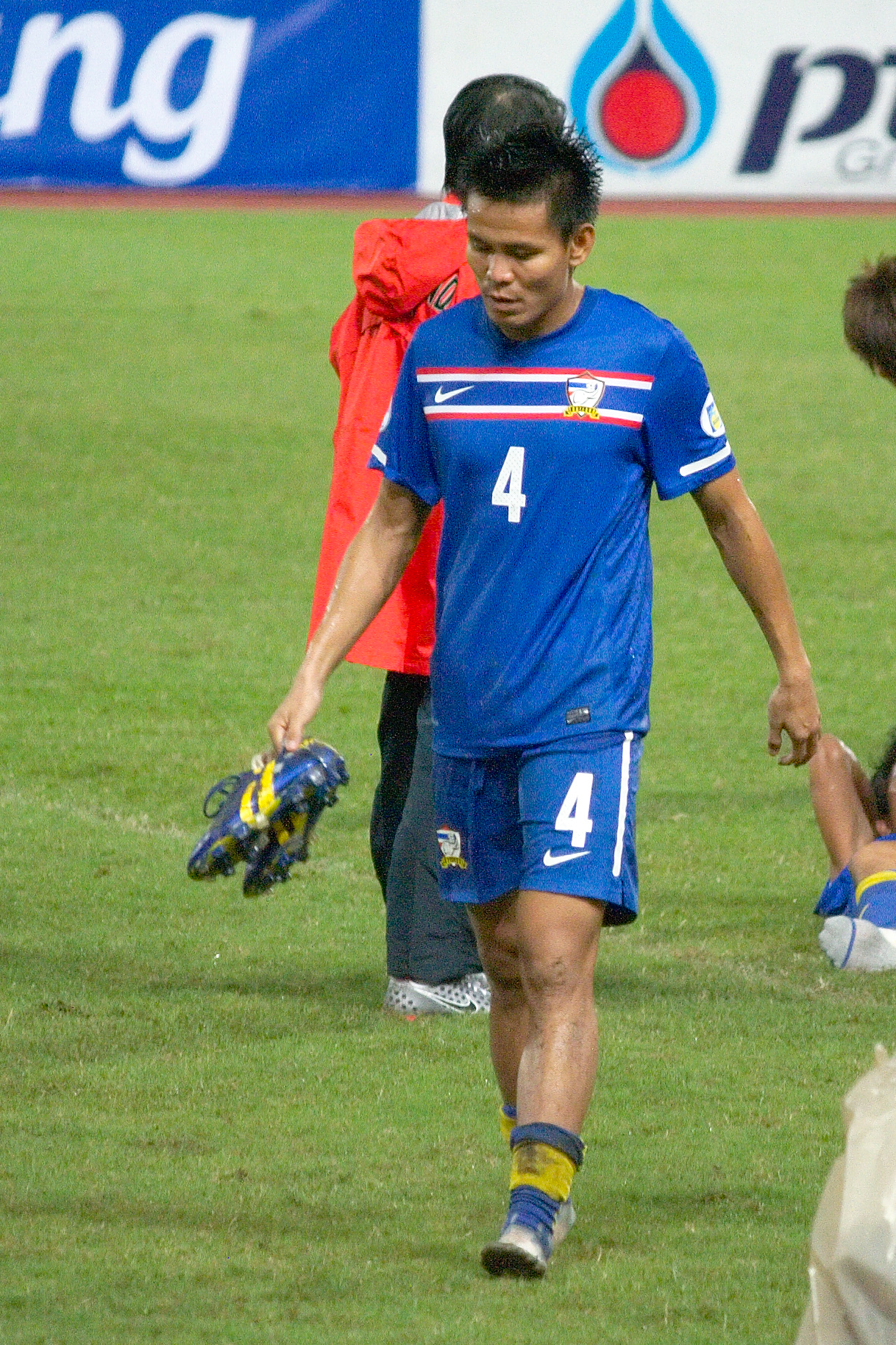

Personal information
- Full name: Chonlatit Jantakam
- Date of birth: 2 June 1985 (age 41)
- Place of birth: Maha Sarakham, Thailand
- Height: 1.79 m (5 ft 10 1/2 in)
- Positions: Centre back; defensive midfielder

Team information
- Current team: Kasem Bundit University (assistant coach)

Youth career
- 1998–2000: Saensuk School
- 2001–2003: Chulabhorn's College Chonburi

Senior career*
Years	Team	Apps	(Gls)
2004–2019	Chonburi	301	(6)
2019	→ Udon Thani (loan)	5	(0)
2019	→ Phrae United (loan)	8	(0)
2020	Lampang	4	(0)
2020	Sisaket	12	(0)
2020–2021	Songkhla	10	(0)
2021–2022	Pattaya Discovery United	25	(0)
Total		365	(6)

International career^{‡}
2007	Thailand U23		
2008–2014	Thailand	45	(0)

Managerial career
- 2023: Rasisalai United
Medal record
Thailand
Asean Football Championship
Runner-up	AFF Suzuki Cup 2008	2008
Runner-up	AFF Suzuki Cup 2012	2012
Thailand under-23
Sea Games
Gold medal – first place	Sea Games 2007	Football
- * Club domestic league appearances and goals as of March 8, 2022 ‡ National team caps and goals as of February 29, 2012

Chonlatit Jantakam (Thai: ชลทิตย์ จันทคาม, born June 2, 1985), simply known as Chon (Thai: ชล), is a Thai professional football manager and retired professional footballer.

== Club career ==
He played for Chonburi FC in the 2008 AFC Champions League group stages.

== International career ==
On the back of performing extremely well in the Thailand Premier League, Cholratit was called up to the full national side in coach Peter Reid's first squad announcement. He was called up with 35 other players to the 2008 T&T Cup hosted by Vietnam. He made his debut against North Korea on October 28, 2008 in the T&T Cup 2008. Cholratit was a member of the victorious T&T Cup 2008 winning squad.

He was a member of the 2012 AFF Suzuki Cup. In 2013, he was called up to the national team by Surachai Jaturapattarapong to the 2015 AFC Asian Cup qualification.

In October, 2013 he played a friendly match against Bahrain. In October 15, 2013 he played against Iran in the 2015 AFC Asian Cup qualification.

== Honours ==
=== Club ===
Chonburi

- Thai Premier League: 2007
- Thai FA Cup: 2010
- Kor Royal Cup: 2008, 2009, 2010, 2011

=== International ===
Thailand U-23

- Sea Games: 2007

Thailand

- T&T Cup: 2008
