= Kraison Panjaroen =

Thai footballer (born 1986)

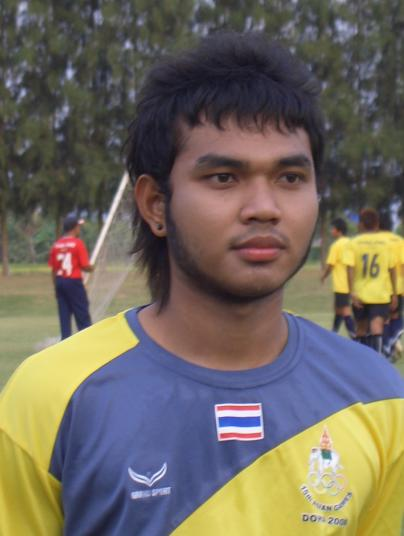

Personal information
- Full name: Kraison Panjaroen
- Date of birth: June 15, 1986 (age 40)
- Place of birth: Sing Buri, Thailand
- Height: 1.67 m (5 ft 5 1/2 in)
- Position: Striker

Youth career
- 2002–2004: Bangkok University

Senior career*
Years	Team	Apps	(Gls)
2005–2008	Bangkok University	57	(25)
2008–2009	Chonburi	7	(0)
2009–2010	Bangkok United	33	(5)
2011	TTM Phichit	14	(1)
2011	TOT	8	(0)
2012–2014	Navy	26	(2)
2014	Chainat Hornbill	0	(0)
2015	Trat	16	(1)
2016	Looktabfah		
2016	Phan Thong		

International career
2007	Thailand U23	2	(0)
- * Club domestic league appearances and goals as of 28 June 2008

Kraison Panjaroen (Thai: ไกรสร ปั้นเจริญ, born June 15, 1986) is a retired professional footballer from Thailand. He won the league title in 2006, as well as having experience of the Asian Champions League in 2007. He moved onto Chonburi in the middle of the 2008 season.

== International career ==
Kraison has been a member of the Full Thailand National team on a number of occasions but has so far failed to make the 16 man cut for matchday selections.

== Honours ==
=== Club ===
Bangkok University

- Thailand Premier League Champions (1) : 2006

Chonburi

- Kor Royal Cup winner (1) : 2008
