= Kriangkrai Pimrat =

Thai footballer (born 1987)

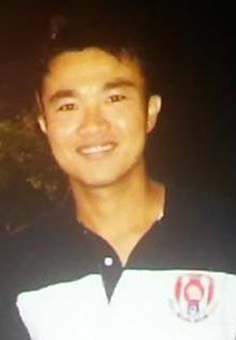

Personal information
- Full name: Kriangkrai Pimrat
- Date of birth: 20 February 1987 (age 39)
- Place of birth: Roi Et, Thailand
- Height: 1.75 m (5 ft 9 in)
- Position: Defensive midfielder

Youth career
- 2003–2005: Chonburi

Senior career*
Years	Team	Apps	(Gls)
2006–2011	Chonburi	66	(0)
2012–2013	Songkhla United	25	(1)
2013	Pattaya United	13	(2)
2014–2015	Suphanburi	9	(0)
2016	PTT Rayong	12	(2)
2017–2018	Navy	6	(0)
2019–2021	Trat	17	(1)
2021–2022	Kasetsart	28	(0)
2022	Samut Prakan City	7	(0)
2023	Banbueng	6	(0)

International career
2009	Thailand U23	1	(1)
- * Club domestic league appearances and goals as of 18 March 2023

Kriangkrai Pimrat (Thai: เกรียงไกร พิมพ์รัตน์; born February 20, 1987) is a Thai professional footballer who plays for Thai League 3 club Banbueng. He played for Chonburi FC in the 2008 AFC Champions League group stages.

== Honours ==
=== Club ===
Chonburi F.C.

- Thailand Premier League Champions (1) : 2007
- Kor Royal Cup Winner (3) : 2008, 2009, 2011
- Thai FA Cup Winner (1) : 2010
