= Kaneung Buransook =

Thai footballer (born 1986)

Personal information
- Full name: Kaneung Buransook
- Date of birth: 8 March 1986 (age 40)
- Place of birth: Buriram, Thailand
- Height: 1.70 m (5 ft 7 in)
- Positions: Attacking midfielder; winger

Youth career
- 2003: Raj-Vithi

Senior career*
Years	Team	Apps	(Gls)
2004	Samut Songkhram	1	(0)
2005–2006	Thai Port	11	(2)
2007–2009	Samut Songkhram	53	(11)
2009–2010	Chonburi	9	(0)
2010	Buriram PEA	8	(1)
2011	Buriram		
2011	→ TTM Phichit (loan)		
2012	Songkhla		
2012	Ratchaburi		
2013–2014	Nakhon Ratchasima		
2014	Samut Songkhram		
2015	Sisaket	17	(1)
2015–2016	Prachuap		
2017	Trat		
- * Club domestic league appearances and goals as of August 29, 2011

Kaneung Buransook (Thai: คนึง บุราณสุข, born March 3, 1986) is a Thai retired professional footballer who played as an attacking midfielder.

== Honours ==
=== Club ===
Ratchaburi

- Thai Division 1 League: 2012
