= Suttinan Phuk-hom =

Thai footballer

Suttinun Phuk-hom
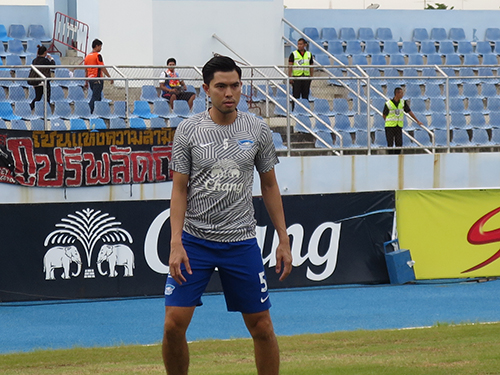

Personal information
- Full name: Suttinun Phuk-hom
- Date of birth: 29 November 1987 (age 38)
- Place of birth: Ratchaburi, Thailand
- Height: 1.81 m (5 ft 11 1/2 in)
- Position: Centre back

Youth career
- 2002–2003: Daruna Ratchaburi School
- 2004: Wat Suthiwararam School
- 2005–2006: Bangkok Christian College

Senior career*
Years	Team	Apps	(Gls)
2007	Nakhon Pathom	28	(1)
2008–2018	Chonburi	122	(9)
2019	PTT Rayong	17	(0)
2020	Sukhothai	0	(0)
2020–2021	Trat	11	(0)
2021	Uthai Thani	12	(1)
Total		190	(11)

International career
2005–2006	Thailand U19	6	(0)
2007–2010	Thailand U23	5	(0)
2008–2018	Thailand	30	(1)
Medal record
Thailand under-23
Sea Games
Gold medal – first place	Sea Games 2007	Football
Thailand
Asean Football Championship
Winner	AFF Suzuki Cup 2014	2014
- * Club domestic league appearances and goals

Suttinun Phuk-hom (Thai: สุทธินันท์ พุกหอม, born November 19, 1984), simply known as M (Thai: เอ็ม) is a Thai retired professional footballer who plays as a centre back. He played for Thailand national team until 2018.

== International career ==
Suttinun made his Debut for the U-23 side during the SEA Games 2009. He has scored 2 goals against Zimbabwe in a friendly match. Suttinun is part of Thailand's squad in the 2014 AFF Suzuki Cup. In May 2015, he was called up to Thailand to play in the 2018 FIFA World Cup qualification (AFC) against Vietnam.

=== International ===
Appearances and goals by national team and year
National team	Year	Apps	Goals
Thailand	2008	2	0
Thailand	2009	1	0
Thailand	2010	8	0
Thailand	2011	4	0
Thailand	2012	1	0
Thailand	2013	1	0
Thailand	2014	7	0
Thailand	2015	7	1
Thailand	Total	31	1

== International goals ==
#	Date	Venue	Opponent	Score	Result	Competition
—	29 December 2009	Thai-Japanese Stadium, Thailand	Zimbabwe	1–0	3–0	Unofficial friendly
—	29 December 2009	Thai-Japanese Stadium, Thailand	Zimbabwe	2–0	3–0	Unofficial friendly
1.	26 March 2015	80th Birthday Stadium, Thailand	Singapore	1–0	2–0	Friendly

== Honours ==
=== Club ===
Chonburi

- Kor Royal Cup (4): 2008, 2009, 2011, 2012

Uthai Thani

- Thai League 3 (1): 2021–22
- Thai League 3 Northern Region (1): 2021–22

=== International ===
Thailand U-23

- Sea Games Gold Medal (1); 2007

Thailand

- ASEAN Football Championship (1): 2014
