= Surat Sukha =

Thai footballer

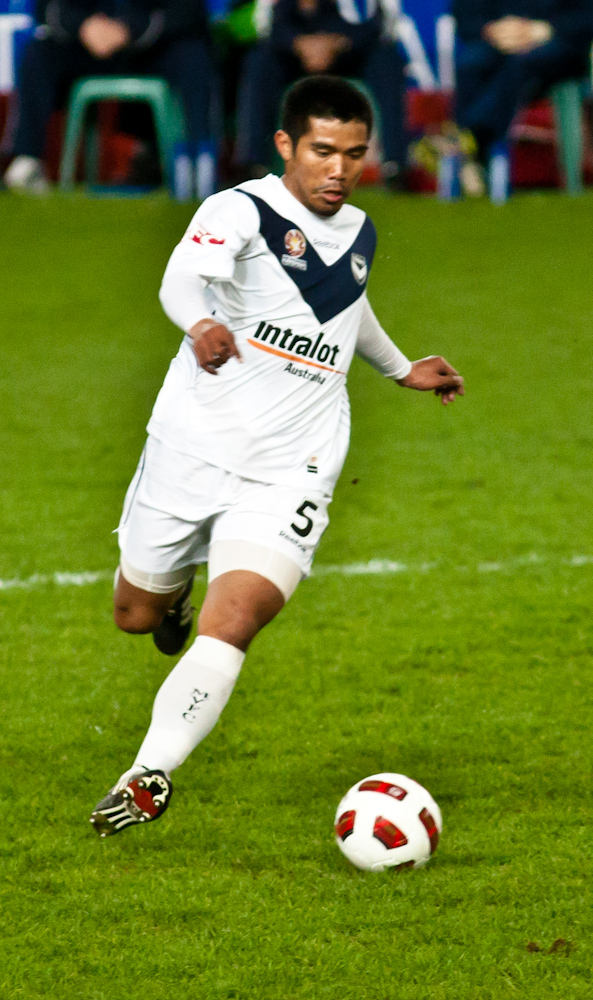
- Surat with Melbourne Victory in 2010

Personal information
- Full name: Surat Sukha
- Date of birth: 27 July 1982 (age 44)
- Place of birth: Sakon Nakhon, Thailand
- Height: 1.76 m (5 ft 9 in)
- Position: Defensive midfielder

Youth career
- 1997–2000: Assumption College Sriracha

Senior career*
Years	Team	Apps	(Gls)
2001–2009	Chonburi	167	(5)
2009–2011	Melbourne Victory	36	(0)
2011–2016	Buriram United	56	(0)
2017	Ubon UMT United	13	(0)
2018–2019	Sisaket	24	(0)
Total		296	(5)

International career^{‡}
2008–2013	Thailand	22	(0)
Medal record
Thailand under-23
Sea Games
Gold medal – first place	Sea Games 2003	Football
- * Club domestic league appearances and goals as of 01:17, 29 October 2017 (UTC) ‡ National team caps and goals as of 29 February 2012

Surat Sukha (Thai: สุรัตน์ สุขะ; born July 27, 1982) is a Thai retired professional footballer who played as a defensive midfielder.

== Personal life ==
Surat's twin older brother Suree was also a footballer who played as a right-back or defender.

== Club career ==
=== Chonburi ===
In Chonburi Surat played as a defender and as a midfielder. He helped his team win the 2007 Thailand Premier League.

=== Melbourne Victory ===
Thailand international recruited from Chonburi FC in Thailand. Surat Sukha joined Melbourne Victory following a successful stint with Chonburi, where he was part of the Thai club's AFC Champions League 2008 and AFC Cup 2009 campaigns. Sukha made his international debut for Thailand in 2008 and joined Melbourne Victory for two years in 2009.

Surat joined 2-time A-League champions, Melbourne Victory, for a transfer fee of ฿1.5million (A$57,700) on 14 May 2009 on a 2-year deal worth A$140,000 "I am very proud, happy and excited to be the first player (from south-east Asia) to play in the A-League." he said.

He made his first appearance for his new club substituting in the 78th minute of the game on 15 August 2009 and made his first line-up at Melbourne Victory in a 1-0 win over North Queensland Fury on 20 August 2009.

Melbourne Victory has secured Surat for an additional year after he extended his contract with the club until 2012.

=== Buriram United ===
In July 2011 he was released by Melbourne, after the club had agreed to an unknown transfer fee for Thailand Premier League club Buriram PEA. It was also claimed that Sukha's family was not happy living in Australia, and this influenced his decision to leave the Victory. It was reported that he gets 300,000 baht per month at Buriram. Surat played for Buriram in the 2012 AFC Champions League. He also played in the 2013 AFC Champions League for Buriram. Surat won the 2013 Thai Premier League with his team.

== International career ==
On the back of performing extremely well in the Thai Premier League with Chonburi, Surat was called up to the full national side in coach Peter Reid's first squad announcement, He was called up with 35 other players to the 2008 T&T Cup hosted by Vietnam.

== Career statistics ==
=== International ===
Appearances and goals by national team and year
National team	Year	Apps	Goals
Thailand	2008	9	0
Thailand	2009	6	0
Thailand	2010	1	0
Thailand	2011	6	0
Thailand	2012	1	0
Thailand	2013	2	0
Total		25	0

== Style of play ==
He was a defensive midfielder who could also play as a defender.
