= Michael Byrne (footballer, born 1985) =

Welsh footballer

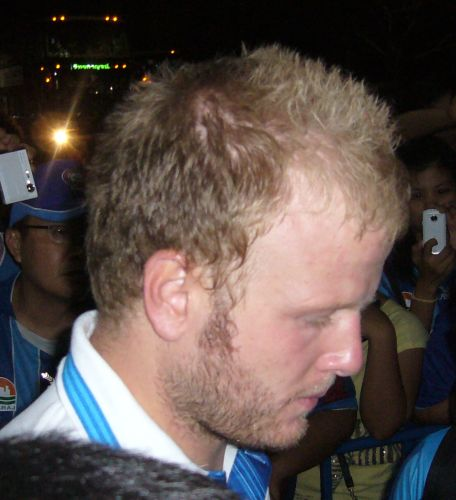

Personal information
- Full name: Michael Thomas Byrne
- Date of birth: 14 May 1985 (age 41)
- Place of birth: Ashton-under-Lyne, England
- Positions: Midfielder; striker

Youth career
- 2001–2003: Bolton Wanderers

Senior career*
Years	Team	Apps	(Gls)
2003–2005	Stockport County	1	(1)
2004	→ Leigh RMI (loan)	7	(3)
2005–2008	Northwich Victoria	81	(10)
2008	Stalybridge Celtic	2	(0)
2009	Nakhon Pathom	15	(4)
2009–2010	Chonburi	23	(8)
2010–2011	Bangkok Glass	19	(4)
2011–2013	Chainat	28	(9)
2014	Ayutthaya	16	(4)
2015	Hua Hin City	14	(3)
Total		206	(46)

International career
2001–2002	Wales U17	3	(0)
2003–2004	Wales U19	5	(1)
- * Club domestic league appearances and goals

Michael Thomas Byrne (born 14 May 1985) is a Welsh retired footballer who plays as a midfielder.

== Career ==
Byrne was born in Ashton-under-Lyne, England but plays at international level for Wales. He has played for the Welsh U17 and Wales U19 sides as well as both the U23 and full Semi-professional teams. He was called up to the U21 squad to replace the injured Gareth Williams for a UEFA Under-21 Championship qualification match against Finland U21s in 2002, but was an unused substitute.

His club career started at Bolton's youth academy, but he was released in early 2003. Leigh RMI expressed an interest in March 2003 but ultimately he signed for Stockport County in August. In his time at Stockport he made only one first team appearance, scoring a 'fine goal' on his debut in a 4–1 loss at Notts County. In September 2004 he joined Leigh RMI on a one-month loan, impressing manager Phil Starbuck on his debut and helping the team to their first victory of the season. At the end of October he was released by Stockport and remained without a club until signing for Northwich Victoria in February 2005. Despite being transfer-listed at the start of the 2007–08 season, Byrne remained at the club until November 2008 and was then released.

He then spent some time at Stalybridge Celtic before signing for Thai club Nakhon Pathom, and was booked in his 8 March debut against Bangkok United in the first game of the 2009 season. He has moved from Nakhon Pathom to Chonburi after the end of the first leg of the Thai Premier league, his move was fairly cheap only ฿500,000 (around £10,000).

On 28 July 2010 he moved to Bangkok Glass after agreeing terms and signing a two-and-a-half-year contract, the contract has a ฿3 million (around £60,000) buy-out clause.
