= Douglas Cobo =

Brazilian footballer (born 1987)

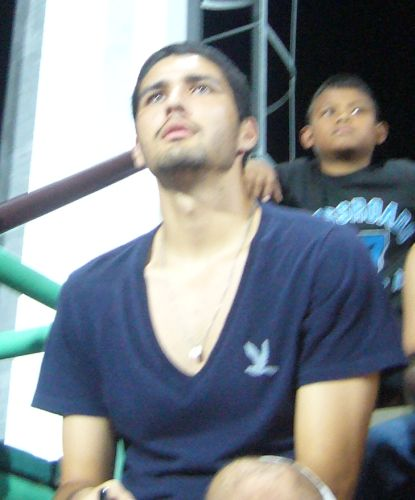

Personal information
- Full name: Douglas Felipe Moreira Cobo
- Date of birth: March 19, 1987 (age 39)
- Place of birth: Assis, Brazil
- Height: 1.87 m (6 ft 1 1/2 in)
- Position: Centre back

Youth career
- 2000–2004: São Paulo

Senior career*
Years	Team	Apps	(Gls)
2005–2008	Taboão da Serra	61	(2)
2009	Chonburi	5	(1)
2009	→ Sriracha (loan)	16	(0)
2010	BEC Tero Sasana	23	(2)
2011–2012	Sriracha	31	(6)
2013	Trat	0	(0)
2014	Bangu	0	(0)
2014–2015	Floriana	30	(2)
2016	Taboão da Serra	22	(1)
2016–2017	São José	7	(0)
2018–2022	Khon Kaen United	99	(7)
2022–2023	Songkhla	19	(1)
- * Club domestic league appearances and goals as of 7 May 2023

Douglas Felipe Moreira Cobo (born March 19, 1987), more commonly known as Douglas Cobo, is a Brazilian professional footballer, currently playing for Songkhla in the Thai League 3

== Honours ==
=== Club ===
Songkhla

- Thai League 3 Southern Region: 2022–23
