= Mohamed Koné (footballer, born 1984) =

Ivorian footballer

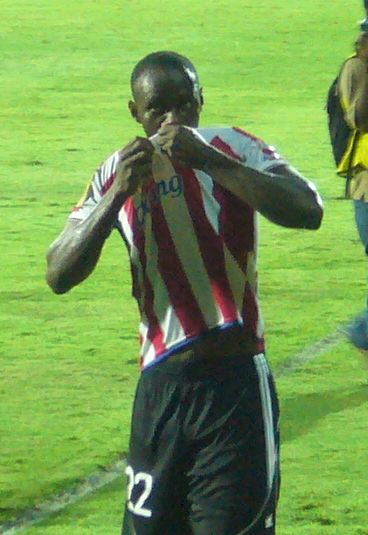

Personal information
- Full name: Mohamed Koné
- Date of birth: 28 February 1984 (age 42)
- Place of birth: Abidjan, Ivory Coast
- Height: 1.85 m (6 ft 1 in)
- Position: Striker

Youth career
- 1999–2000: EFYM

Senior career*
Years	Team	Apps	(Gls)
2001	Nakhon Pathom	24	(14)
2002	Nakhon Pathom	16	(13)
2003–2005	Krung Thai Bank	33	(18)
2006–2007	Chonburi	27	(15)
2008	Hoang Anh Gia Lai	22	(13)
2009	Chonburi	35	(21)
2009–2010	→ Yangon United (loan)	6	(6)
2010–2013	Muangthong United	29	(17)
2011	→ Mechelen (loan)	0	(0)
2011	→ TOT (loan)	27	(10)
2015	Loei City	13	(10)
2016	Phrae United	6	(1)
Total		238	(137)
- * Club domestic league appearances and goals as of June 07, 2014 ‡ National team caps and goals as of June 07, 2014

Mohamed Koné (born February 28, 1984) is an Ivorian former professional footballer.

== Career ==
He moved to the Burmese club Yangon United on loan from Thai Premier League club Chonburi F.C. in 2009 after finishing as second top goalscorer with 14 goals in the 2009 Thai Premier League. According to the Chonburi fan club, Koné is one of Chonburi's best players of all time, and they were shocked to find out that he has never played for a bigger club. He has most recently been linked with a move to England or France, with reported interest from Preston North End and FC Lorient. He now plays for TOT FC in the Thai Premier League, and frequently performs a moonwalk after scoring goals.

== Honours ==
- Krung Thai Bank F.C.
  - Thai Premier League: 2003–04
- Chonburi F.C.
  - Thai Premier League: 2007
  - Kor Royal Cup: 2009
- Muang Thong United F.C.
  - Thai Premier League: 2010
  - Thai Premier League: 2012
  - Kor Royal Cup: 2010
