= Natthaphong Samana =

Thai footballer (born 1984)

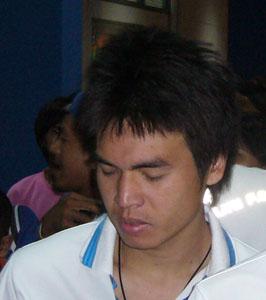

Personal information
- Full name: Natthaphong Samana
- Date of birth: 29 June 1984 (age 42)
- Place of birth: Chiang Mai, Thailand
- Height: 1.74 m (5 ft 8 1/2 in)
- Positions: Left back; winger

Youth career
- 1997–1999: Prince Royal's College
- 2000–2002: Assumption College Sriracha

Senior career*
Years	Team	Apps	(Gls)
2004–2006	Krung Thai Bank	44	(5)
2007–2014	Chonburi	134	(5)
2015–2019	Suphanburi	92	(0)
2020–2022	Chiangmai United	14	(0)
Total		284	(10)

International career^{‡}
2000–2001	Thailand U17	0	(0)
2002–2003	Thailand U19	6	(0)
2004–2007	Thailand U23	12	(0)
2007–2012	Thailand	35	(1)
Medal record
Thailand U23
SEA Games
Gold medal – first place	2007 SEA Games
- * Club domestic league appearances and goals as of 10 July 2016 ‡ National team caps and goals as of 29 February 2012

Natthaphong Samana (Thai: ณัฐพงษ์ สมณะ, born 29 June 1984), is a Thai retired professional footballer who last played as a left back. Natthaphong has also played for Thai Premier League rivals Krung Thai Bank FC from 2004 to 2006. He played for the Thailand national football team.

== International career ==
=== International ===
As of 12 November 2015

National team	Year	Apps	Goals
Thailand	2007	9	1
Thailand	2008	13	0
Thailand	2009	7	0
Thailand	2010	6	0
Thailand	2011	1	0
Thailand	2012	1	0
Thailand	Total	37	1

== International goals ==
#	Date	Venue	Opponent	Score	Result	Competition
1.	January 14, 2007	Bangkok, Thailand	Philippines	4-0	Won	ASEAN Football Championship

== Honours ==
=== Club ===
Chonburi

- Thai Premier League
  - Champions (1) : 2007
- Thai FA Cup
  - Winners (1) : 2010
- Kor Royal Cup
  - Winners (4) : 2008, 2009, 2010, 2011

=== International ===
Thailand U-23

- Sea Games
  - Gold Medal (1); 2007

Thailand

- ASEAN Football Championship
  - Runner-up (2) : 2007, 2008
