= Ekaphan Inthasen =

Thai footballer (born 1983)

Personal information
- Full name: Ekaphan Inthasen
- Date of birth: 23 September 1983 (age 43)
- Place of birth: Surat Thani, Thailand
- Height: 1.67 m (5 ft 5 1/2 in)
- Positions: Winger; forward

Youth career
- 1999–2002: Surat Thani
- 2002–2003: Bangkok Bank

Senior career*
Years	Team	Apps	(Gls)
2004–2006	Bangkok Bank	57	(11)
2006	Nam Định	10	(4)
2007–2011	Chonburi	49	(10)
2012	BEC Tero Sasana	7	(2)
2012–2014	Bangkok Glass	23	(1)
2014	Singhtarua	9	(1)
2015–2017	Super Power Samut Prakan	58	(3)
Total		213	(32)

International career^{‡}
2000	Thailand U17	9	(3)
2001–2002	Thailand U19	18	(7)
2003–2006	Thailand U23	14	(8)
2004–2013	Thailand	12	(1)

Managerial career
- 2023–2024: Kasetsart
- * Club domestic league appearances and goals ‡ National team caps and goals as of 29 February 2012

Ekaphan Inthasen (Thai: เอกพันธ์ อินทเสน, born September 23, 1983) is a Thai retired professional footballer who played as a winger. He previously played for two other clubsides in Thailand and Vietnam.

He won the Thailand Premier League title with Chonburi in 2007, followed by the Kor Royal Cup in 2008 in which has earned himself a call up to the Thailand national football team.

== Club career ==
Ekaphan born in Surat Thani and attended Suratthani state secondary school. Ekaphan began his career in the youth team of his home club Surat Thani F.C. at the age of 16 years. In 2002, he joined the youth team of the Bangkok Bank and played from 2004 for the seniors section of the club. In 2006, he went to Vietnam for a season to Nam Dinh F.C. in the V.League. But even there he could win a title with the club, finishing in ninth place at the end of the table. He then returned to Thailand to Bangkok Bank. At the start of the 2008 season, he joined the then reigning champions Chonburi F.C., for whom he played until today. With him he previously won two Super Cups, and was runner-2008. In the 2008 AFC Champions League, he came here five times for use. In 2009, he plays with his current club in the AFC Cup.

== International career ==
for the national team, he was in the 2005 U-21 squad and the U-23 squad for the Southeast Asian Games. [1] [2] In the Southeast Asian Games in 2005 he won the gold medal with the U-23rd. In 2004 Ekaphan had his first missions for the seniors team. But could still not been established in the national team squad.

=== International goals ===
==== Under-19 ====
#	Date	Venue	Opponent	Score	Result	Competition
1.	January 23, 2002	Bangkok, Thailand	Singapore	2–1	5–1	2002 AFF U-20 Youth Championship
2.	January 28, 2002	Bangkok, Thailand	Malaysia	2–0	8–1	2002 AFF U-20 Youth Championship
3.	January 28, 2002	Bangkok, Thailand	Malaysia	3–0	8–1	2002 AFF U-20 Youth Championship
4.	January 28, 2002	Bangkok, Thailand	Malaysia	4–0	8–1	2002 AFF U-20 Youth Championship
5.	January 28, 2002	Bangkok, Thailand	Malaysia	5–0	8–1	2002 AFF U-20 Youth Championship
6.	February 1, 2002	Bangkok, Thailand	Vietnam	3–1	3–2	2002 AFF U-20 Youth Championship

==== Thailand ====
#	Date	Venue	Opponent	Score	Result	Competition
1.	December 26, 2005	Surakul Stadium, Thailand	Oman	1–0	1–0	2005 King's Cup

== Honours ==
=== Club ===
Chonburi

- Thai Premier League: 2007
- Thai FA Cup: 2010
- Kor Royal Cup: 2008, 2009, 2011

=== International ===
Thailand U-19

- AFF U-20 Youth Championship: 2002

Thailand U-23

- Sea Games Gold Medal: 2005
