= Phanuwat Jinta =

Thai footballer (born 1987)

Personal information
- Full name: Phanuwat Jinta
- Date of birth: 6 January 1987 (age 39)
- Place of birth: Surat Thani, Thailand
- Height: 1.66 m (5 ft 5 1/2 in)
- Position: Midfielder

Team information
- Current team: Customs United
- Number: 23

Senior career*
Years	Team	Apps	(Gls)
2006–2013	Chonburi	76	(9)
2013	→ Songkhla United (loan)	16	(4)
2013	→ Pattaya (loan)	13	(1)
2014–2015	Chainat Hornbill	40	(3)
2016	PTT Rayong	9	(2)
2016	Udon thani	9	(4)
2017–2021	PT Prachuap	20	(0)
2021–2022	Nakhon Si United	22	(1)
2023	Banbueng	9	(0)
2023–	Customs United	10	(0)

International career
2003–2004	Thailand U17	5	(0)
2005–2006	Thailand U19	7	(0)
2009–2010	Thailand U23	1	(0)
- * Club domestic league appearances and goals as of 18 March 2023

Phanuwat Jinta (Thai: ภานุวัฒน์ จินตะ, born January 6, 1987), simply known as (Thai: เต๊าะ), is a Thai professional footballer.

He played for Chonburi FC in the 2008 AFC Champions League group stage.

== Honours ==
=== Club ===
Chonburi FC

- Thailand Premier League Champions (1) : 2007
- Kor Royal Cup Winner (2) : 2008, 2009

PT Prachuap FC

- Thai League Cup (1) : 2019
