= Arthit Sunthornphit =

Thai footballer (born 1986)

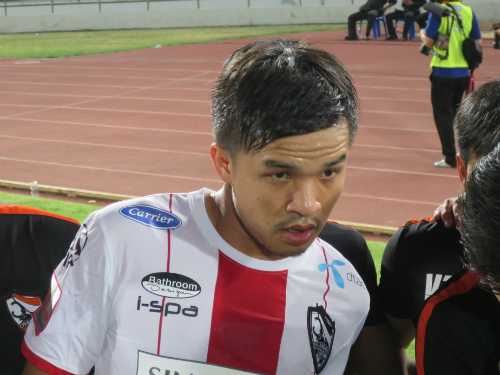

Personal information
- Full name: Arthit Sunthornphit
- Date of birth: 19 April 1986 (age 40)
- Place of birth: Khon Kaen, Thailand
- Height: 1.79 m (5 ft 10 1/2 in)
- Position: Midfielder

Youth career
- 2001–2003: Assumption College Sriracha

Senior career*
| Years | Team | Apps | (Gls) |
| 2004–2013 | Chonburi | 168 | (28) |
| 2012 | → Wuachon United (loan) | 11 | (1) |
| 2014–2015 | Chainat Hornbill | 32 | (2) |
| 2015–2016 | Chiangrai United | 46 | (4) |
| 2017–2018 | PTT Rayong | 29 | (5) |
| 2019–2021 | Khon Kaen United | 53 | (5) |
| 2021–2022 | Lamphun Warrior | 34 | (4) |
| 2022–2023 | Phitsanulok | 23 | (5) |
| 2023–2024 | Samut Sakhon City | 20 | (6) |
| 2024 | Pattaya United | 7 | (1) |
| 2024– | Muang Loei United | 0 | (1) |

International career^{‡}
| 2007–2009 | Thailand U23 | 10 | (5) |
| 2008–2013 | Thailand | 18 | (3) |

Managerial career
- 2025–: Muang Loei United
Medal record
Thailand
Asean Football Championship
| Runner-up | AFF Suzuki Cup 2008 | 2008 |
| Runner-up | AFF Suzuki Cup 2012 | 2012 |
- * Club domestic league appearances and goals as of 14 January 2024 ‡ National team caps and goals as of 18 July 2008

Arthit Sunthornphit (Thai: อาทิตย์ สุนทรพิธ, born April 19, 1986), simply known as Bas (Thai: บาส), is a Thai professional footballer who plays as a midfielder for Thai League 2 club Pattaya United. Arthit is left-footed and is a free kick specialist.

== International career ==
Arthit was a member of the victorious T&T Cup 2008 winning squad.

Arthit was part of Winfried Schäfer's squad in the 2012 AFF Suzuki Cup.

=== International ===
As of 12 November 2015

| National team | Year | Apps | Goals |
|---|---|---|---|
| Thailand | 2008 | 7 | 2 |
| Thailand | 2011 | 2 | 0 |
| Thailand | 2013 | 8 | 1 |
| Thailand | Total | 17 | 3 |

== International goals ==
| # | Date | Venue | Opponent | Score | Result | Competition |
|---|---|---|---|---|---|---|
| 1. | December 8, 2008 | Surakul Stadium, Thailand | Laos | 3–0 | 6–0 | 2008 AFF Suzuki Cup |
| 2. | December 8, 2008 | Surakul Stadium, Thailand | Laos | 4–0 | 6–0 | 2008 AFF Suzuki Cup |
| 3. | November 8, 2012 | SCG Stadium, Thailand | Malaysia | 2–0 | 2–0 | Friendly Match |

== Honours ==
=== Club ===
Chonburi

- Thailand Premier League: 2007
- Kor Royal Cup: 2008, 2009

Khon Kaen United

- Thai League 3: 2019
- Thai League 3 Upper Region: 2019

Lamphun Warriors

- Thai League 2: 2021–22

Phitsanulok

- Thai League 3 Northern Region: 2022–23

=== International ===
Thailand U-23

- Sea Games Gold Medal: 2007

Thailand

- T&T Cup: 2008
