= Suree Sukha =

Thai retired professional footballer (born 1982)

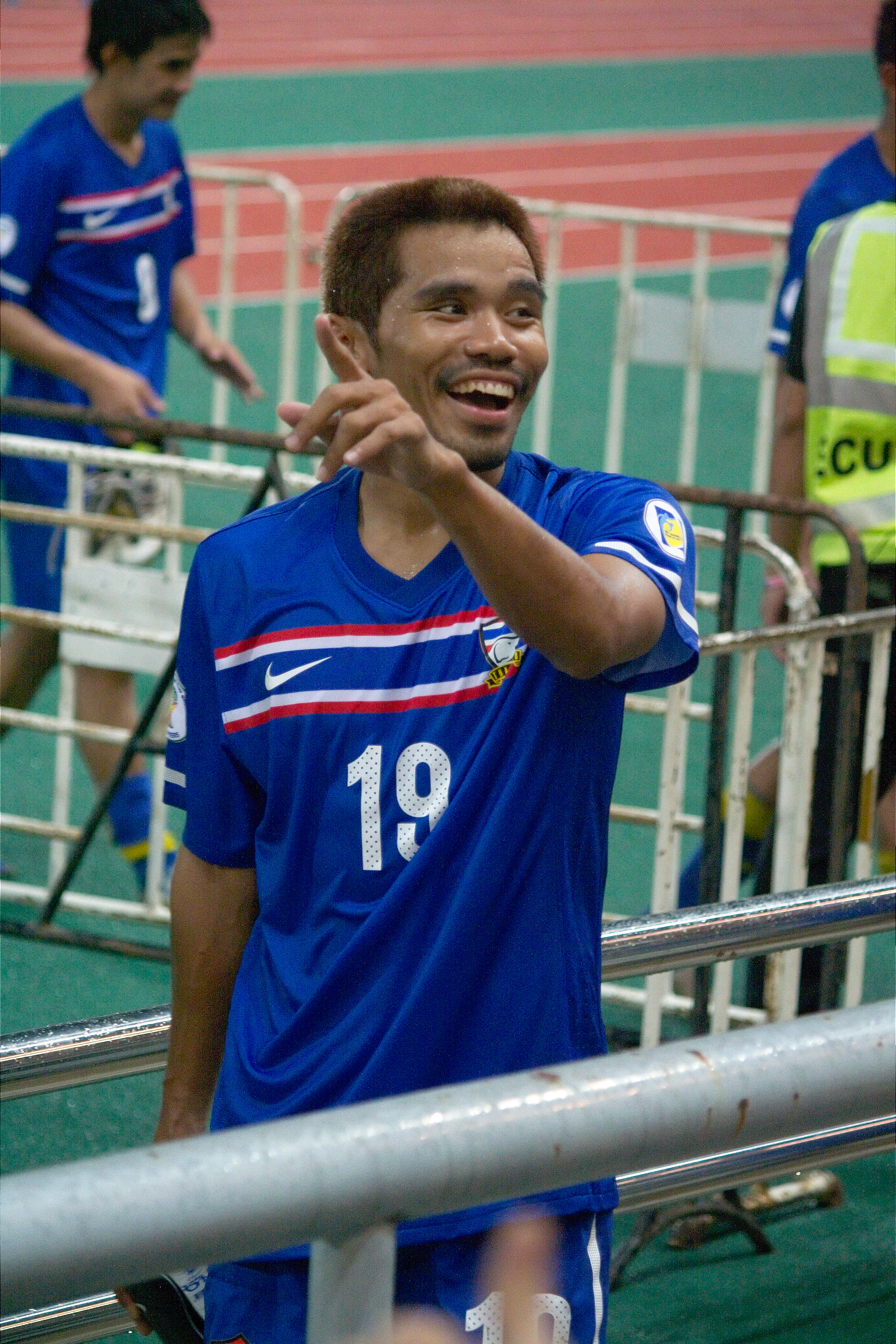

Personal information
- Full name: Suree Sukha
- Date of birth: 27 July 1982 (age 44)
- Place of birth: Sakon Nakhon, Thailand
- Height: 1.77 m (5 ft 10 in)
- Positions: Right-back; centre-back

Youth career
- 1997–2000: Assumption College Sriracha

Senior career*
Years	Team	Apps	(Gls)
2001	Balestier Khalsa	8	(2)
2001–2007	Chonburi	96	(7)
2007–2008	Manchester City	0	(0)
2008	→ Grasshopper (loan)	0	(0)
2008–2012	Chonburi	115	(10)
2013–2016	Buriram United	69	(0)
2017–2018	Ubon UMT United	40	(0)
2018–2019	Ratchaburi Mitr Phol	11	(0)
2020	Muangkan United	2	(0)
2020	→ Kanchanaburi (loan)	9	(0)
Total		350	(19)

International career
1998–1999	Thailand U17	9	(0)
2000–2001	Thailand U19	12	(0)
2002–2005	Thailand U23	14	(1)
2006–2012	Thailand	67	(2)
- * Club domestic league appearances and goals as of 23:39, 11 July 2020 (UTC)

Suree Sukha (Thai: สุรีย์ สุขะ, born July 27, 1982) is a Thai retired professional footballer who played as a defender.

== Personal life ==
Suree's twin younger brother Surat was also a footballer who played as a midfielder.

== Club career ==
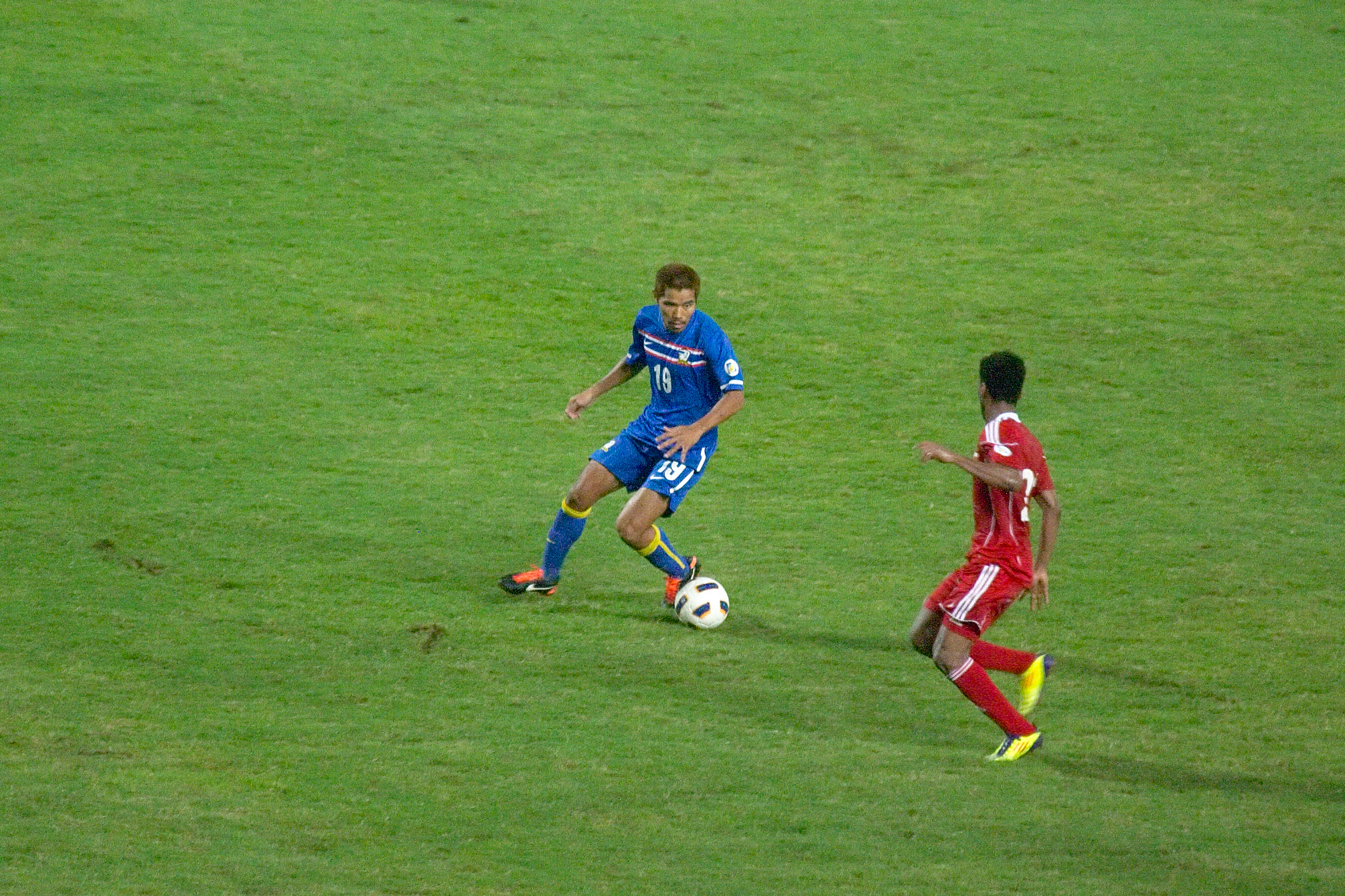
Suree with Thailand national football team in 2011

Suree formerly played for Manchester City following a two-week trial with fellow Thai internationals Kiatprawut Saiwaeo and Teerasil Dangda,. Sukha's contract was set to be signed by the English club, but his work permit application was denied by the British Home Office as players originating from countries outside of the FIFA-ranked top 70 do not qualify according to Home Office guidelines. He also failed to pass on a clause requiring players to have participated in 75% of their country's internationals in the two years previous to the submission of the permit application.

After a long wait, Sukha finally signed for Manchester City along with fellow Thai internationals and City trialists Kiatprawut Saiwaeo and Teerasil Dangda on 16 November 2007, on the same day that his former club, Chonburi, announced a partnership agreement with his new club.

On 9 May 2008, Sukha was quoted in the Bangkok Post, as stating his future would lie in either China or Australia after his loan spell at Grasshoppers Zurich.

On 9 December 2020, Sukha announced his retirement.

== Career statistics ==
=== International ===
Appearances and goals by national team and year
National team	Year	Apps	Goals
Thailand	2005	3	0
Thailand	2006	5	0
Thailand	2007	18	1
Thailand	2008	15	0
Thailand	2009	10	0
Thailand	2010	7	1
Thailand	2011	6	0
Thailand	2012	3	0
Total		67	2

Scores and results list Thailand's goal tally first, score column indicates score after each Sukha goal.

List of international goals scored by Suree Sukha
No.	Date	Venue	Opponent	Score	Result	Competition
1	15 October 2007	Estádio Campo Desportivo, Taipa, Macau	Macau	2–0	7–1	2010 FIFA World Cup qualification
2	7 December 2010	Gelora Bung Karno Stadium, Jakarta, Indonesia	Indonesia	1–0	1–2	2010 AFF Championship

== Honours ==
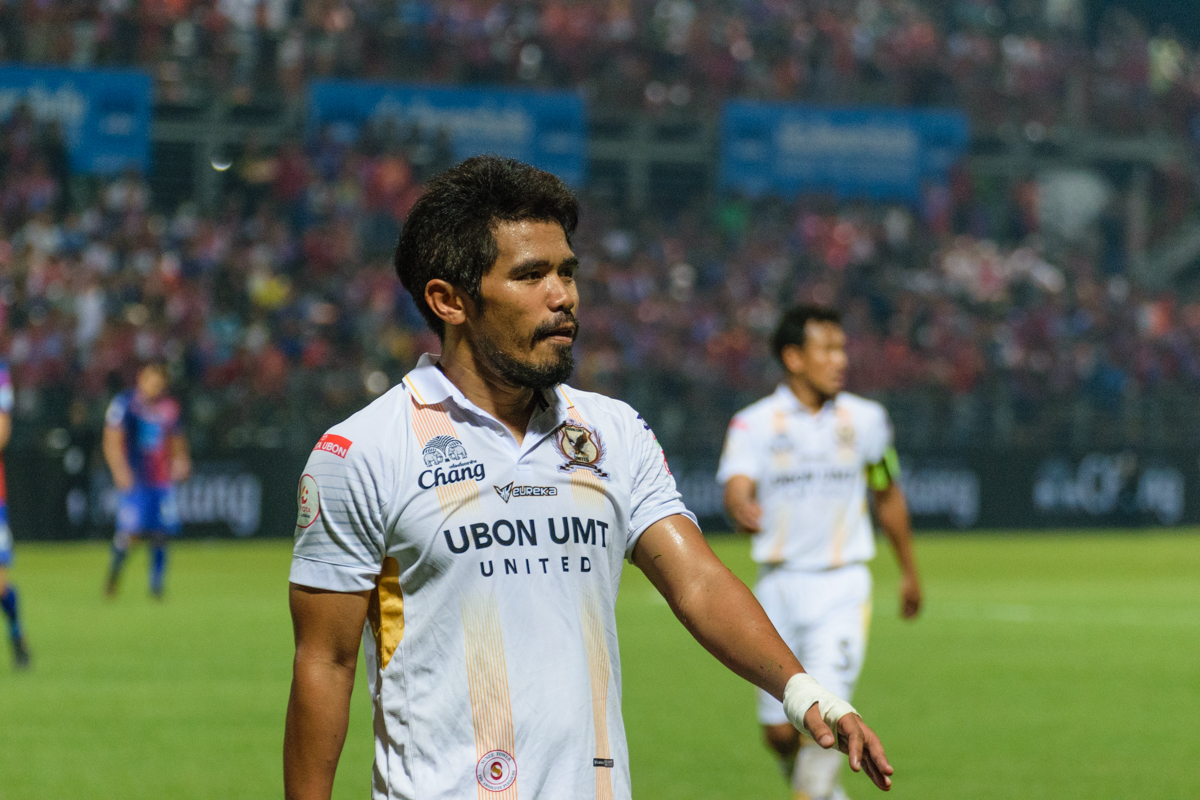
Suree with Ubon UMT United in 2018

=== Club ===
Buriram United

- Thai Premier League: 2013, 2014, 2015
- Thai FA Cup: 2013, 2015
- Thai League Cup: 2013, 2015
- Toyota Premier Cup: 2014, 2016
- Kor Royal Cup: 2013, 2014, 2015, 2016
- Mekong Club Championship: 2015

=== International ===
Thailand U-23

- SEA Games Gold Medal; 2005
