= Kiatprawut Saiwaeo =

Thai footballer (born 1986)

Personal information
- Full name: Kiatprawut Saiwaeo
- Date of birth: 24 January 1986 (age 40)
- Place of birth: Ubon Ratchathani, Thailand
- Height: 1.87 m (6 ft 1 1/2 in)
- Position: Defender

Youth career
- 2001–2003: Chulabhorn's College Chonburi
- 2004: Chonburi

Senior career*
Years	Team	Apps	(Gls)
2005–2007	Chonburi	57	(2)
2007–2008	Manchester City	0	(0)
2008	→ Club Brugge KV (loan)	0	(0)
2009–2013	Chonburi	39	(2)
2014–2017	Chiangrai United	69	(6)
2017	Chonburi	7	(0)
2018	Police Tero	0	(0)
Total		172	(10)

International career^{‡}
2005–2006	Thailand U19	19	(2)
2007–2009	Thailand U23	22	(0)
2005–2010	Thailand	36	(0)
Medal record
Thailand under-23
Sea Games
Gold medal – first place	Sea Games 2005	Football
Gold medal – first place	Sea Games 2007	Football
- * Club domestic league appearances and goals as of 23 June 2008 ‡ National team caps and goals as of 18 July 2009

Kiatprawut Saiwaeo (Thai: เกียรติประวุฒิ สายแวว, born January 24, 1986), simply known as Car (Thai: คาร์), is a Thai retired professional footballer who played as a defender.

== Club career ==
=== Manchester City ===
Kiatprawut was one of three Thai players given trials by Manchester City shortly after former Thailand Prime Minister, Thaksin Shinawatra's takeover of the club in July 2007, prompting suggestions that the moves were made for political rather than footballing reasons. The trio signed contracts in November 2007, but did not come close to making a first team appearance, and lacked work permits due to Thailand's low world ranking. Consequently, Kiatprawut was sent on loan to Belgian club Club Brugge. At the end of the season Manchester City went to Thailand on a promotional tour, where Kiatprawut made his only appearance for Manchester City, a 3–1 defeat in a friendly match against a Thailand XI.

Shortly after the start of the 2008–09 season, Thaksin's controlling stake in Manchester City was bought by the Abu Dhabi United Group. A fortnight later, on 16 October 2008, Kiatprawut was released from Manchester City. He subsequently returned to Chonburi.

== International career ==
Kiatprawut was a Thailand international until 2010. Following appearances for Thailand under-23s, he was included in the senior squad for the 2007 AFC Asian Cup, where he played two matches.

== Honours ==
Thailand U-23

- Sea Games Gold Medal (1); 2003, 2005
