= 2012 Kor Royal Cup =

Chonburi	Buriram United
2	2
- (4 – 3 p)
- Date: 11 March 2012
- Venue: Suphachalasai Stadium, Bangkok
- Referee: Apisit Aonrak

The 2012 Kor Royal Cup was the 77th Kor Royal Cup, an annual football match contested by the winners of the previous season's Thai Premier League and Thai FA Cup competitions. The match was played at Suphachalasai Stadium, Bangkok, on 11 March 2012, and contested by 2011 Thai Premier League champions Buriram United, and 2011 Thai Premier League runners-up Chonburi, as Buriram also won the 2011 Thai FA Cup.

MATCH RULES

- 90 minutes.
- Penalty shoot-out if necessary.
- Maximum of three substitutions.

== See also ==
- 2011 Thai Premier League
- 2011 Thai FA Cup
