= Pipob On-Mo =

Thai footballer

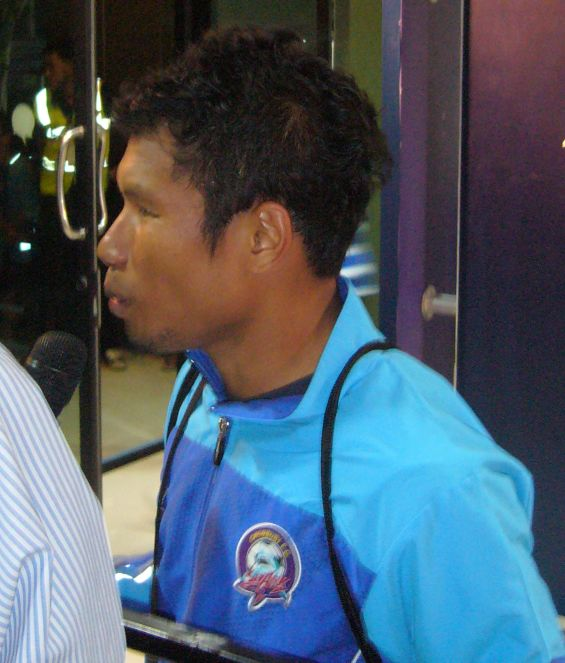

Personal information
- Full name: Pipob On-Mo
- Date of birth: 28 April 1979 (age 47)
- Place of birth: Phichit, Thailand
- Height: 1.63 m (5 ft 4 in)
- Position: Striker

Youth career
- 1994–1996: Assumption College Sriracha
- 1997–2000: Sripatum University

Senior career*
Years	Team	Apps	(Gls)
2000–2005	BEC Tero Sasana	137	(19)
2006–2018	Chonburi	404	(108)
Total		541	(127)

International career^{‡}
1998	Thailand U17	3	(0)
2005–2012	Thailand	6	(0)

Managerial career
- 2019–2021: Chonburi (assistant)
- 2021–2022: Thailand U23 (assistant)
- 2022–2023: Thailand U16
- 2023–2024: Rayong
- 2024: Chonburi
- 2024–2025: Sisaket United
- 2025: Khonkaen United
- 2025–2026: Pattaya United
- * Club domestic league appearances and goals as of 27 November 2017 ‡ National team caps and goals as of 27 November 2017

Pipob On-Mo (Thai: พิภพ อ่อนโม้; born 22 April 1979) is a Thai professional football manager and former player who was most recently head coach of Thai League 2 club Pattaya United.

== Club career ==
Pipob On-Mo began his career in 2000 with BEC Tero Sasana, and won two league titles with the club. Additionally, the club reached the AFC Champions League final in 2003, but Pipob was not used. In 2007, Pipob signed with Chonburi. In his first season at Chonburi, he won another title and was voted Player of the Year. In 2019 Pipob accepted an offer to join the club's first-team coaching staff at Chonburi after his retirement at the end of the 2018 season.

== International career ==
Although he played for the Thailand U-17's and won the AFC U-17 Championships with them in 1998, he did not debut for the senior team until 2005. He played in the 2012 AFF Suzuki Cup as a substitute. He later retired from the national team.

=== International ===
As of 12 November 2015

National team	Year	Apps	Goals
Thailand	2007	1	0
Thailand	2011	2	0
Thailand	2012	2	0
Thailand	Total	5	0

== Managerial career ==
=== Chonburi ===
On 20 May 2024, Chonburi announced that Pipob would become head coach in the next season in Thai League 2.

== Managerial statistics ==
As of match played 20 September 2026

Managerial record by team and tenure
Team	Nat.	From	To	Record								Ref.
Team	Nat.	From	To	G	W	D	L	GF	GA	GD	Win %	Ref.
Thailand U17	(Thailand)	8 July 2021	28 December 2023	13	8	1	4	26	16	+10	61.54	
Rayong	(Thailand)	25 December 2023	25 May 2024	21	9	7	5	41	28	+13	42.86	
Chonburi	(Thailand)	26 May 2024	25 November 2024	15	8	3	4	24	14	+10	53.33	
Sisaket United	(Thailand)	24 December 2024	30 May 2025	16	4	4	8	12	25	−13	25.00	
Khon Kaen United	(Thailand)	31 May 2025	12 November 2025	13	5	4	4	31	18	+13	38.46	
Pattaya United	(Thailand)	29 December 2025	29 September 2026	21	7	7	7	26	26	+0	33.33	
Career Total				99	41	26	32	160	127	+33	41.41	

== Honours ==
=== Player ===
BEC Tero Sasana

- Thai Premier League: 2000, 2001-02
- Thai FA Cup: 2000
- Kor Royal Cup: 2001

Chonburi

- Thai Premier League: 2007
- Thai FA Cup: 2010
- Kor Royal Cup: 2008, 2009, 2010, 2011

Thailand U-17

- AFC U-17 Championship: 1998

=== Manager ===
Rayong

- Thai League 2 play-offs: 2024

Individual

- Thai League 2 Manager of the Month: August 2024
