= 2007 Thailand Premier League =

Thai Premier League
- Season: 2007
- Champions: Chonburi
- Relegated: Suphanburi; Thai Honda; Royal Thai Navy; Royal Thai Police
- 2008 AFC Champions League: Chonburi; Krung Thai Bank
- Top goalscorer: (Brazil) Ney Fabiano de Oliveira (Thailand Tobacco Monopoly FC) (18)
- Biggest home win: Royal Thai Army 5-1; Port Authority of Thailand; Tobacco Monopoly 4-0 Royal Thai Army; Port Authority of Thailand 4-0 Suphanburi
- Biggest away win: Royal Thai Police 0-7; BEC Tero Sasana
- Highest scoring: Royal Thai Police 0-7; BEC Tero Sasana (7 goals)

The 2007 Thai Premier League had 16 teams, combining the 12 member clubs from the 2006 season, the top two clubs from Division 1, and two clubs from the Pro League 1. The official name of the league at this time was Thailand Premier League.

Matches were normally played on Saturdays with a 4pm kick off time but there were some 5pm or 6pm started and some midweek fixtures. Evening kick offs were rare. The season would have a three-month break from mid-May to mid-August because of the Asian Cup which was being co-hosted by Thailand from July 7–29 and the world university games, the Universiade, in Bangkok from August 8–18.

Normally only the Premier League champions are allowed to take part in the AFC Champions League. However, for the 2007 season, the runners-up would also be admitted due to the late completion of Indonesian domestic league and cup competitions.

== Member clubs ==
- Bangkok Bank
- Bangkok University
- BEC Tero Sasana
- Chonburi
- Krung Thai Bank
- Nakhon Pathom (promoted from Provincial League)
- Osotsapa M-150
- Port Authority of Thailand
- Provincial Electricity Authority
- Royal Thai Army
- Royal Thai Navy (promoted from Division 1)
- Royal Thai Police (promoted from Division 1)
- Suphanburi
- Thai Honda
- Thailand Tobacco Monopoly
- TOT (promoted from Provincial League)

== Stadium and locations ==
Locations of the 2007 Thailand Premier League teams

Team	Location	Stadium	Capacity	Ref.
Bangkok Bank	Bangkok	King Mongkut's Institute of Technology Ladkrabang Stadium Bangkok Bank Football Field (Udomsuk)	3,500 ?	
Bangkok University	Pathum Thani	Bangkok University Stadium (Rangsit)	?	
BEC Tero Sasana	Nong Chok, Bangkok	BEC Tero Sasana Nong Chok Stadium	?	
Chonburi	Chonburi	Chonburi Municipality Stadium	?	
Krung Thai Bank	Bangkok	Chulalongkorn University Sports Stadium	15,000	
Nakhon Pathom	Nakhon Pathom	Sanam Chan Palace Sports Stadium	6,000	
Osotsapa M-150	Bang Kapi, Bangkok	Klong Chan Sports Center	?	
Port Authority of Thailand	Pathum Thani	Thupatemee Stadium	25,000	
PEA	Chonburi	IPE Chonburi Stadium	12,000	
Royal Thai Army	Bangkok	Thai Army Sports Stadium	15,000	
Royal Thai Navy	Sattahip, Chonburi	Sattahip Navy Stadium	12,500	
Royal Thai Police	Ratchaburi	Ratchaburi Province Stadium	10,000	
Suphanburi	Suphanburi	Suphan Buri Provincial Stadium	25,000	
Thai Honda	Min Buri, Bangkok	72nd Anniversary Stadium (Min Buri)	?	
Thailand Tobacco Monopoly	Pathum Thani	Thupatemee Stadium	25,000	
TOT	Nonthaburi	Namkaejon Stadium	?	

Football clubs in Bangkok Metropolitan Region

== Final league table ==
Pos	Team	Pld	W	D	L	GF	GA	GD	Pts	Qualification or relegation
1	Chonburi	30	19	6	5	50	25	+25	63	Champion and Qualification for the 2008 AFC Champions League
2	Krung Thai Bank	30	15	9	6	40	24	+16	54	Qualification for the 2008 AFC Champions League
3	BEC Tero Sasana	30	14	9	7	47	29	+18	51	
4	Bangkok University (Note: Defending Champion)	30	14	5	11	39	36	+3	47 (Note: Head to Head: Bangkok Univ win 2-1)	
5	Royal Thai Army	30	13	8	9	40	33	+7	47	
6	Tobacco Monopoly	30	12	8	10	43	42	+1	44 (Note: Head to Head: Tobacco win 3-1)	
7	Bangkok Bank	30	10	14	6	28	23	+5	44	
8	PEA	30	13	3	14	35	40	−5	42	
9	Osotsapa	30	10	10	10	38	36	+2	40	
10	TOT (Note: Promoted from last season)	30	9	10	11	35	35	0	37 (Note: Head to Head: TOT win 2-1)	
11	Nakhon Pathom	30	8	13	9	30	29	+1	37	
12	Port Authority	30	9	9	12	36	43	−7	36	
13	Suphanburi	30	9	8	13	37	45	−8	35	Relegation
14	Thai Honda	30	7	8	15	26	38	−12	29	Relegation
15	Royal Thai Navy	30	5	12	13	21	35	−14	27	Relegation
16	Royal Thai Police	30	5	4	21	19	51	−32	19	Relegation

Source: rsssf.com
Rules for classification: 1st points; 2nd head-to-head; 3rd goal difference; 4th goals scored

== Season notes ==
- The following clubs were promoted from the Division 1 League and joined the Premier League for 2008:
  - Chula-Sinthana
  - Coke-Bangpra
  - Customs Department
  - Samut Songkhram
- Thai Premier League was combined with Provincial League completely. Chonburi FC was the first club from Provincial League that was the champion of Thai Premier League in this season.

== Asian representation ==
- League champions Bangkok University took centre stage for Thailand in their first foray into the Asian Champions League, they put up a good fight, losing 3 games and drawing 3 games in an impressive campaign, although they still finished bottom of their group stage. Only one team would be for the Asian Champions League due to the fact that Australia entered the Asian Confederation.
- Osotsapa would enter the 2007 AFC Cup, the first time a Thai team would enter this competition. They came third in their group, and only 3 points behind the group winners.
- After reaching the final the previous year, Chonburi made a swift exit from the Singapore Cup getting beat in the first round by Balestier Khalsa. Bangkok University brought back some pride when they duly dispatched of Balestier Khalsa in the Quarter-Final stage before being knocked out by Tampines Rovers in the semi-final.

== Results ==
Home \ Away	PAT	PEA	CHO	POL	ARM	TOT	BKB	KTB	NPA	BEC	TOB	BKU	NAV	SUP	OSO	HON
PAT		2–2	1–3	2–1	2–1	1–4	1–1	1–2	0–0	2–2	1–1	2–1	1–2	4–0	3–2	0–1
PEA	2–1		0–4	3–2	1–2	1–0	1–2	1–1	1–0	0–3	3–2	0–2	0–2	1–0	1–2	3–1 (Note: eligible)
Chonburi	2–0	0–1		0–0	1–1	0–0	0–0	3–2	3–1	1–3	1–2	0–1	2–1	1–0	1–0	3–2
Police	0–1	0–3	0–2		0–1	1–2	0–0	0–3	1–0	0–7	0–2	2–3	1–0	3–2	1–3	1–0
Army	5–1	2–1	0–2	1–0		3–1	1–2	0–0	0–1	1–1	1–0	1–1	2–0	3–2	3–1	0–0
TOT	0–0	1–0	1–2	2–1	4–1		2–2	1–0	2–1	0–0	2–3	1–2	1–1	1–2	1–1	2–2
BKK Bank	0–0	3–1	0–2	0–0	0–1	1–0		0–1	0–0	2–1	0–1	1–0	0–0	1–1	2–2	1–0
Krung Thai	0–1	0–1	1–1	2–1	1–0	2–0	0–0		0–3	2–1	3–0	1–2	1–1	0–0	0–0	3–2
N Pathom	1–1	1–0	0–1	1–0	2–2	0–0	0–0	0–3		1–1	1–1	2–0	2–2	1–1	1–2	1–0
BEC tero	1–0	2–1	1–2	2–1	1–1	2–1	0–0	1–2	0–4		1–1	3–0	2–0	1–0	1–0	1–2
Tobacco	2–3	0–2	0–2	3–0	4–0	1–1	2–1	0–3	2–2	0–2		2–4	0–0	2–1	1–1	2–1
BKK Univ	1–3	0–2	3–1	3–2	1–0	1–0	1–1	2–3	2–0	0–0	1–3		1–1	0–1	1–0	3–0
Navy	2–1	1–1	0–1	0–0	0–4	2–1	0–1	0–0	0–1	1–1	1–2	1–0		2–2	1–1	0–2
Suphanburi	1–0	1–0	2–2	1–0	2–1	1–2	3–4	0–1	4–3	1–2	1–2	1–3	1–0		2–2	2–2
Osotsapa	2–0	3–0	0–3	2–0	0–1	1–1	1–3	2–2	0–0	2–4	0–0	2–0	2–0	1–2		1–0
Honda	1–1	0–2	2–4	0–1	1–1	0–1	1–0	0–1	0–0	1–0	3–2	0–0	1–0	0–0	1–2	

Source: rsssf.com
Legend: Blue = home team win; Yellow = draw; Red = away team win.

== Annual awards ==
=== Coach of the Year ===
- (Thailand) Jadet Meelarp – Chonburi

=== Player of the year ===
- (Thailand) Pipob On-Mo – Chonburi

=== Top scorer ===
- (Brazil) Ney Fabiano de Oliveira – 18 Goals Thailand Tobacco Monopoly

== See also ==
- 2007 Thailand League Division 1
- 2007 Thailand League Division 2

Preceded by Thai Premier League; 2006	Thai Premier League; 2007; Chonburi	Succeeded by Thai Premier League; 2008
