= Kor Royal Cup =

- Organising body: Football Association of Thailand
- Founded: 1916
- Folded: 2016
- Country: Thailand
- Domestic cup: Thai FA Cup

Kor Royal Cup (Thai: ถ้วยพระราชทาน ก.; ถ้วย ก.), known as the Yai Cup (Thai: ถ้วยใหญ่) until 1963, was the highest level of club football competition which competed in the tournament in Thailand from 1916 to 1995. It was founded by the Football Association of Thailand in 1916. Department of Performing Arts was the first team that won this competition.

In 1996, the Thai League 1 was formed by the Football Association of Thailand to act as the top professional football league in place of the Kor Royal cup. From then on the trophy was contested in an annual match between the champions and the runners-up of Thai Premier League until 2009. The Kor Royal Cup was adapted to be the trophy contested annually between the champions of the Thai League 1 and the Thai FA Cup winners (or league runners-up if the same team had won both) from 2010 to 2016.

Since 2017, the national Super Cup match between the Thai League 1 champions and the Thai FA Cup winners has been known as the Thailand Champions Cup.

== Championship history ==
=== 2010–2016 ===
The trophy was contested in an annual match between the champions of the Thai League 1 and the champions of the Thai FA Cup.

Year	Winner	Scorers	Score	Scorers	Runner-up
2010	Muangthong United	Koné Mohamed 67'; Dagno Siaka 81'	2 – 0 Thai Port forfeited due to crowd riots		Thai Port
2011	Chonburi	Suree Sukha 65'; Ekaphan Inthasen 85'	2 – 1	Christian Kouakou 88'	Muangthong United
2012	Chonburi	Adul Lahsoh 45'+ Ludovick Takam 90'+	2 – 2 CFC on pens	Theerathon Bunmathan 31'; Frank Acheampong 33'	Buriram United
2013	Buriram United	Ramsés Bustos	2 – 0		Muangthong United
2014	Buriram United	Jay Simpson 79'	1 – 0		Muangthong United
2015	Buriram United	Diogo Luís Santo 57'	1 – 0		Bangkok Glass
2016	Buriram United	Diogo Luis Santo 14'; Andrés Túñez 65'; Jakkaphan Kaewprom 83'	3 – 1	Adisak Kraisorn 78'	Muangthong United

=== 1996–2009 ===
The trophy was contested in an annual match between the champions and the runners-up of Thai Premier League
(the competition form may be adjusted in some seasons).

Season	Winner
1996	Royal Thai Air Force
1997	Sinthana
1998	Sinthana
1999	Thai Farmer Bank
2000	BEC Tero Sasana
2001	Osotsapa
2002	Krung Thai Bank
2003	Krung Thai Bank
2004/05	Thailand Tobacco Monopoly
2006	Osotsapa
2007	Chonburi
2009	Chonburi

=== 1916–1995 ===
The top level of club football competition.

Season	Winner
1916	Department of Performing Arts
1917	Vajiravudh College
1918	Vajiravudh College
1919	Vajiravudh College
1920	Chulalongkorn University
1921	Royal Military Academy
1922	Royal Military Academy
1923	Royal Thai Naval Academy
1924	Royal Thai Naval Academy
1925	Cancelled
1926	Kong Dern Rot
1927	Kong Dern Rot
1928	Suankularb Wittayalai School
1929	Suankularb Wittayalai School
1930	Assumption Academy
1931	Thailand Post
1932-47	Cancelled
1948	Bang Rak Academy
1949	Assumption Academy
1950	Cancelled
1951	Chai Sod
1952	Royal Thai Air Force
1953	Royal Thai Air Force
1954	Hakka Association of Thailand
1955	Chula-Alumni Association
1956	Hainan Association of Thailand
1957	Royal Thai Air Force
1958	Royal Thai Air Force
1959	Royal Thai Air Force
1960	Royal Thai Air Force

Season	Winner
1961	Royal Thai Air Force
1962	Royal Thai Air Force
1963	Royal Thai Air Force
1964	Bangkok Bank
1965	Royal Thai Police
1966	Bangkok Bank
1967	Bangkok Bank
1967	Royal Thai Air Force
1968	Port Authority of Thailand
1969	Raj Vithi
1970	Raj Pracha
1971	Raj Pracha
1972	Port Authority of Thailand
1973	Raj Vithi
1974	Port Authority of Thailand
1975	Raj Vithi
1976	Port Authority of Thailand
1977	Raj Vithi
1978	Port Authority of Thailand
1979	Port Authority of Thailand
1980	Raj Pracha
1981	Bangkok Bank
1982	Raj Pracha
1983	Royal Thai Army
1984	Bangkok Bank
1985	Port Authority of Thailand
1986	Bangkok Bank
1987	Royal Thai Air Force
1988	Krung Thai Bank
1989	Bangkok Bank

Season	Winner
1990	Port Authority of Thailand
1991	Thai Farmers Bank
1992	Thai Farmers Bank
1993	Thai Farmers Bank
1994	Bangkok Bank
1995	Thai Farmers Bank

== See also ==
- Thai Premier League
- Thai football records and statistics
