= 2009 AFC Cup group stage =

Football tournament group stage

The group stage of the AFC Cup (Asian Football Confederation) matches took place between 10 March and 19 May 2009.

== Groups ==
=== West Asia ===
==== Group A ====
Team	Pld	W	D	L	GF	GA	GD	Pts	BUS	NEF	AHD	TIL
(Bahrain) Busaiteen	6	3	3	0	14	7	+7	12		2–2	4–2	3–0
(Uzbekistan) Neftchi Farg'ona	6	3	2	1	12	9	+3	11	1–1		2–1	1–0
(Lebanon) Al-Ahed	6	2	1	3	13	10	+3	7	1–1	5–1		3–0
(Yemen) Al-Tilal	6	1	0	5	3	16	−13	3	1–3	0–5	2–1	

2009-03-10
15:45 UTC+3

Al-Tilal (Yemen)	1–3	(Bahrain) Busaiteen
Fatehi Ahmed 60'	(Report) (Summary)	Basel Sultan 12'; Robert Akaruye 69', 85' (pen.)

22nd May Stadium, Aden
Attendance: 5,000
Referee: (Syria) Abdulrrhman Racho
2009-03-10
18:00 UTC+3

Al-Ahed (Lebanon)	5–1	(Uzbekistan) Neftchi Farg'ona
Salih Sadir 45', 75' (pen.); Mohammed Halaweh 48'; Agripino Junior 55'; Ahmed Zreik 60'	(Report) (Summary)	Alisher Halikov 37'

Sports City Stadium, Beirut
Attendance: 5,000
Referee: (Kuwait) Atallah Al Enezi

2009-03-17
18:30 UTC+3

Busaiteen (Bahrain)	4–2	(Lebanon) Al-Ahed
Robert Akaruye 40', 90+5'; Ali Norooz 64'; Abdulwahab Ali 66'	(Summary)	Hassan Maatouk 50'; Agripino Junior 73'

Bahrain National Stadium, Manama
Attendance: 100
Referee: (Jordan) Mohammad Abu Loum
2009-03-17
17:00 UTC+5

Neftchi Farg'ona (Uzbekistan)	1–0	(Yemen) Al-Tilal
Sherzod Hakimov 50' (pen.)	(Summary)

Neftchi Stadium, Fergana
Attendance: 16,000
Referee: (Japan) Kenji Ogiya

2009-04-07
19:30 UTC+3

Al-Ahed (Lebanon)	3–0	(Yemen) Al-Tilal
Agripino Junior 76', 88'; Ahmed Trad 81'	Report

Sports City Stadium, Beirut
Attendance: 7,000
Referee: (Iran) Alireza Faghani
2009-04-07
17:30 UTC+5

Neftchi Farg'ona (Uzbekistan)	1–1	(Bahrain) Busaiteen
Alisher Halikov 90'	Report	Robert Akaruye 85'

Neftchi Stadium, Fergana
Attendance: 10,000
Referee: (Maldives) Ali Saleem

2009-04-21
15:45 UTC+3

Al-Tilal (Yemen)	2–1	(Lebanon) Al-Ahed
Mohammed Ali Farid 61'; Samir Karama 85'	Report	Salih Sadir 16'

22nd May Stadium, Aden
Attendance: 600
Referee: (Iraq) Alaa Al-Abadee
2009-04-21
18:30 UTC+3

Busaiteen (Bahrain)	2–2	(Uzbekistan) Neftchi Farg'ona
Rabee Lafoui 7', 89'	Report	Mansurjon Saidov 24'; Alisher Halikov 42'

Bahrain National Stadium, Manama
Attendance: 250
Referee: (Turkmenistan) Çarymyrat Gurbanow

2009-05-05
18:30 UTC+3

Busaiteen (Bahrain)	3–0	(Yemen) Al-Tilal
Robert Akaruye 64', 72'; Abdulwahab Ali 65'	Report

Bahrain National Stadium, Manama
Attendance: 100
Referee: Chaiya Mahapab (Thailand)
2009-05-05
18:00 UTC+5

Neftchi Farg'ona (Uzbekistan)	2–1	(Lebanon) Al-Ahed
Aziz Alijonov 44' (pen.); Sardor Mirzaev 70'	Report	Mohammed Halaweh 6'

Neftchi Stadium, Fergana
Attendance: 15,000
Referee: Hedayat Mombeni (Iran)

2009-05-19
15:45 UTC+3

Al-Tilal (Yemen)	0–5	(Uzbekistan) Neftchi Farg'ona
	Report	Alisher Halikov 13', 35', 67'; Umidjon Boqiyev 74', 79'

22nd May Stadium, Aden
Attendance: 1,500
Referee: Dmitry Mashentsev (Kyrgyzstan)
2009-05-19
20:00 UTC+3

Al-Ahed (Lebanon)	1–1	(Bahrain) Busaiteen
Hassan Matouk 79'	Report	Mohamed Al Ansari 70'

Sports City Stadium, Beirut
Attendance: 2,000
Referee: Mohamed Alzarouni (UAE)

==== Group B ====
Team	Pld	W	D	L	GF	GA	GD	Pts	ZAW	SAF	HIL	SUW
(Iraq) Al-Zawraa	6	4	1	1	8	3	+5	13		2–1	2–0	2–0
(Lebanon) Safa	6	4	0	2	5	3	+2	12	1–0		0–1	1–0
(Yemen) Al-Hilal Al-Sahili	6	2	1	3	5	7	−2	7	1–1	0–1		2–0
(Oman) Al-Suwaiq	6	1	0	5	3	8	−5	3	0–1	0–1	3–1	

2009-03-10
19:00 UTC+4

Al-Suwaiq (Oman)	0–1	(Lebanon) Safa
	Summary; Report	Mohammad Kassas 24'

Al-Seeb Stadium, Seeb
Attendance: 2,000
Referee: (Tajikistan) Dilovarshokh Orzuev
2009-03-10
19:00 UTC+3

Al-Zawraa (Iraq)	2–0	(Yemen) Al-Hilal Al-Sahili
Salar Abdul-Jabar 6'; Omar Kadhim 88'	Summary; Report

Al-Maktoum Stadium, Dubai, UAE
Attendance: 150
Referee: (United Arab Emirates) Mohamed Al Zarouni

2009-03-17
18:00 UTC+3

Safa (Lebanon)	1–0	(Iraq) Al-Zawraa
Guy Charles Jimgou 35'	Report

Beirut Municipal Stadium, Beirut
Attendance: 700
Referee: (Uzbekistan) Vladislav Tseytlin
2009-03-17
15:45 UTC+3

Al-Hilal Al-Sahili (Yemen)	2–0	(Oman) Al-Suwaiq
Yasser Basuhai 46'; Berhanu Kassim 90+2'	Report

Ali Mohsen Al-Muraisi Stadium, Sanaa
Attendance: 4,000
Referee: (Thailand) Chaiya Mahapab

2009-04-07
19:00 UTC+3

Al-Zawraa (Iraq)	2–0	(Oman) Al-Suwaiq
Haidar Sabah 29'; Sajjad Hussein 90+3'	Report

Al-Maktoum Stadium, Dubai, UAE
Attendance: 200
Referee: (Iran) Saeid Mozaffarizadeh
2009-04-07
15:45 UTC+3

Al-Hilal Al-Sahili (Yemen)	0–1	(Lebanon) Safa
	Report	Ali Al Saadi 82'

Ali Mohsen Al-Muraisi Stadium, Sanaa
Attendance: 1,200
Referee: (Kuwait) Alenzi Atallah

2009-04-21
19:15 UTC+4

Al-Suwaiq (Oman)	0–1	(Iraq) Al-Zawraa
	Report	Ahmad Ibrahim 56'

Al-Seeb Stadium, Seeb
Attendance: 500
Referee: (Jordan) Mohammad Mousa Khalaf
2009-04-21
18:00 UTC+3

Safa (Lebanon)	0–1	(Yemen) Al-Hilal Al-Sahili
	Report	Akram Al Selwi 15'

Beirut Municipal Stadium, Beirut
Attendance: 150
Referee: (Bahrain) Nawaf Shukralla

2009-05-05
18:00 UTC+3

Safa (Lebanon)	1–0	(Oman) Al-Suwaiq
Mohammad Kassas 72' (pen.)	Report

Beirut Municipal Stadium, Beirut
Attendance: 200
Referee: Mohamed Alzarouni (UAE)
2009-05-05
15:45 UTC+3

Al-Hilal Al-Sahili (Yemen)	1–1	(Iraq) Al-Zawraa
Yasser Basuhai 76'	Report	Adnan Attiya 85'

Ali Mohsen Al-Muraisi Stadium, Sanaa
Attendance: 1,000
Referee: Racho Abdulrrhman (Syria)

2009-05-19
19:30 UTC+4

Al-Suwaiq (Oman)	3–1	(Yemen) Al-Hilal Al-Sahili
Al-Saadi 32'; Al-Saadi 75'; Said Mubarak 85'	Report	Ndombe Papy 80'

Al-Seeb Stadium, Seeb
Attendance: 200
Referee: Alireza Faghani (Iran)
2009-05-19
19:00 UTC+3

Al-Zawraa (Iraq)	2–1	(Lebanon) Safa
Ous Ibrahim 45+2'; Mustafa Ahmad 90+5'	Report	Khodor Salame 31'

Al-Maktoum Stadium, Dubai, UAE
Attendance: 300
Referee: Kakabay Seydov (Turkmenistan)

==== Group C ====
Team	Pld	W	D	L	GF	GA	GD	Pts	ARB	ARL	ORU	MAB
(Kuwait) Al-Arabi	6	3	2	1	11	6	+5	11		2–0	2–0	4–2
(Iraq) Arbil	6	2	2	2	8	7	+1	8	1–1		3–0	3–2
(Oman) Al-Orouba	6	2	2	2	6	7	−1	8	1–1	1–1		3–0
(Lebanon) Al-Mabarrah	6	2	0	4	7	12	−5	6	2–1	1–0	0–1	

2009-03-10
18:00 UTC+3

Al-Mabarrah (Lebanon)	1–0	(Iraq) Arbil
Ali El Atat 20'	(Report) (Summary)

Beirut Municipal Stadium, Beirut
Attendance: 1,000
Referee: (Yemen) Mukhtar Al Yarimi
2009-03-10
17:30 UTC+3

Al-Arabi (Kuwait)	2–0	(Oman) Al-Orouba
Firas Al Khatib 38'; Khaled Khalaf 79'	(Report) (Report)

Sabah Al Salem Stadium, Kuwait City
Attendance: 5,000
Referee: (Iran) Hedayat Mombeni

2009-03-17
16:00 UTC+3

Arbil (Iraq)	1–1	(Kuwait) Al-Arabi
Muslim Mubarak 37'	(Report)	Firas Al Khatib 74'

King Abdullah Stadium, Amman, Jordan
Attendance: 200
Referee: (Bahrain) Nawaf Shukralla
2009-03-17
19:00 UTC+4

Al-Orouba (Oman)	3–0	(Lebanon) Al-Mabarrah
Al-Mukhaini 72'; Abdullah Mubarak 79', 88'	(Report)

Al-Seeb Stadium, Al-Seeb
Attendance: 2,000
Referee: (Turkmenistan) Kakabaý Seýidow

2009-04-07
18:15 UTC+3

Al-Arabi (Kuwait)	4–2	(Lebanon) Al-Mabarrah
Emmanuel Ezukam 1', 55'; Mohammad Jarragh 47'; Ahmed Al Rashidi 90+5'	Report	Bilal Hajo 41'; Joao Alfredo 63'

Sabah Al Salem Stadium, Kuwait City
Attendance: 1,000
Referee: (Syria) Racho Abdulrrhman
2009-04-07
19:15 UTC+4

Al-Orouba (Oman)	1–1	(Iraq) Arbil
Al-Mahaijri 43'	Report	Luay Salah 49'

Al-Seeb Stadium, Al-Seeb
Attendance: 2,000
Referee: (Kyrgyzstan) Dmitry Mashentsev

2009-04-21
18:00 UTC+3

Al-Mabarrah (Lebanon)	2–1	(Kuwait) Al-Arabi
Joao Alfredo 58'; Ali El Atat 90'	Report	Husain Al Mosawi 49'

Sports City Stadium, Beirut
Attendance: 500
Referee: (United Arab Emirates) Mohamed Alzarouni
2009-04-21
16:00 UTC+3

Arbil (Iraq)	3–0	(Oman) Al-Orouba
Luay Salah 43'; Ahmad Salah 49'; Muslim Mubarak 77'	Report

Prince Mohammad Stadium, Zarqa, Jordan
Attendance: 300
Referee: (Thailand) Chaiya Mahapab

2009-05-05
17:00 UTC+3

Arbil (Iraq)	3–2	(Lebanon) Al-Mabarrah
Muslim Mubarak 4'; Ahmad Salah 30' (pen.); Ali Mansour 72'	Report	Joao Alfredo 3'; Tarek Al Ali 76'

Prince Mohammad Stadium, Zarqa, Jordan
Attendance: 200
Referee: Naser Al-Ghafary (Jordan)
2009-05-05
19:30 UTC+4

Al-Orouba (Oman)	1–1	(Kuwait) Al-Arabi
Al-Mukhaini 39'	Report	Khaled Khalaf 36'

Al-Seeb Stadium, Al-Seeb
Attendance: 2,000
Referee: Junjie Huang (China)

2009-05-19
18:00 UTC+3

Al-Mabarrah (Lebanon)	0–1	(Oman) Al-Orouba
	Report	Ibrahim Abdullah 86'

Beirut Municipal Stadium, Beirut
Attendance: 1,000
Referee: Rustam Kholov (Tajikistan)
2009-05-19
20:15 UTC+3

Al-Arabi (Kuwait)	2–0	(Iraq) Arbil
Firas Al Khatib 39', 86'	Report

Sabah Al Salem Stadium, Kuwait City
Attendance: 1,000
Referee: Khalid Alzahrani (Saudi Arabia)

==== Group D ====
Team	Pld	W	D	L	GF	GA	GD	Pts	KUW	KAR	WAH	MOH
Al-Kuwait	6	4	1	1	12	4	+8	13		2–1	1–0	6–0
(Syria) Al-Karamah	6	4	0	2	12	7	+5	12	2–1		3–1	1–0
(Jordan) Al-Wahdat	6	3	1	2	12	7	+5	10	1–1	3–1		5–0
(India) Mohun Bagan	6	0	0	6	1	19	−18	0	0–1	0–4	1–2	

2009-03-10
18:00 UTC+3

Al-Wahdat (Jordan)	1–1	Al-Kuwait
Amer Deeb 68'	(Report) (Summary)	Faraj Laheeb 18'

King Abdullah Stadium, Amman
Attendance: 5,000
Referee: (Iraq) Kadhim Oda Lazim
2009-03-10
19:30 UTC+3

Al-Karamah (Syria)	1–0	(India) Mohun Bagan
M. Al Hamawi 60'	(Report) (Summary)

Khaled bin Walid Stadium, Homs
Attendance: 17,000
Referee: (Turkmenistan) Çarymyrat Gurbanow

2009-03-17
14:30 UTC+5:30

Mohun Bagan (India)	1–2	(Jordan) Al-Wahdat
Rakesh Masih 13'	(Report) (Summary)	Mahmoud Shelbaieh 16'; Hassan Abdel Fattah 43'

Howrah M.C.Stadium, Howrah
Attendance: 10,000
Referee: (Malaysia) Wahab Abdul
2009-03-17
19:30 UTC+3

Al-Kuwait	2–1	(Syria) Al-Karamah
A. Al Marzooqi 32'; André Macanga 61' (pen.)	(Report) (Summary)	Fahd Awde 69'

Al Kuwait SC Stadium, Kuwait City
Attendance: 3,000
Referee: (China) Junjie Huang

2009-04-07
15:00 UTC+5:30

Mohun Bagan (India)	0–1	Al-Kuwait
	(Report) (Summary)	Samer Al Martah 60'

Howrah M.C.Stadium, Howrah
Attendance: 8,000
Referee: (Hong Kong) Ng Chiu Kok
2009-04-07
20:30 UTC+3

Al-Karamah (Syria)	3–1	(Jordan) Al-Wahdat
M. Al Hamawi 45', 51'; T. Haj Mohamad 60'	(Report) (Summary)	Amer Abu Hwaiti 23'

Khaled bin Walid Stadium, Homs
Attendance: 10,000
Referee: (United Arab Emirates) Ali Hamad Al-Badwawi

2009-04-21
18:00 UTC+3

Al-Wahdat (Jordan)	3–1	(Syria) Al-Karamah
Mahmoud Shelbaieh 12'; Hassan Abdel Fattah 29'; Ra'fat Ali 69'	(Report) (Summary)	Darko 3'

King Abdullah Stadium, Amman
Attendance: 8,000
Referee: (Iran) Hedayat Mombeni
2009-04-21
19:30 UTC+3

Al-Kuwait	6–0	(India) Mohun Bagan
J. Al Hussain 9' (pen.), 21', 72'; Faraj Laheeb 34', 39'; Jarah Al Ataiqi 78'	(Report) (Summary)

Al Kuwait SC Stadium, Kuwait City
Attendance: 3,000
Referee: (Uzbekistan) Vladislav Tseytlin

2009-05-05
18:00 UTC+3

Al-Wahdat (Jordan)	5–0	(India) Mohun Bagan
Manju 27' (o.g.); Issa Al-Sabah 29', 40'; Hassan Abdel Fattah 67' (pen.); Ra'fat Ali 85'	(Report) (Summary)

King Abdullah Stadium, Amman
Attendance: 4,000
Referee: (Lebanon) Mohammad Mansour
2009-05-05
20:30 UTC+3

Al-Karamah (Syria)	2–1	Al-Kuwait
H. Al Taiar 71'; Richard 90+5'	(Report) (Summary)	J. Al Hussain 26'

Khaled bin Walid Stadium, Homs
Attendance: 13,000
Referee: (South Korea) Choi Myung-Yong

2009-05-19
15:00 UTC+5:30

Mohun Bagan (India)	0–4	(Syria) Al-Karamah
	(Report) (Summary)	H. Al Taiar 17', 72'; A. Al Shbli 39'; M. Al Hamawi 60'

Howrah M.C.Stadium, Howrah
Attendance: 3,200
Referee: (Sri Lanka) Hettikamkanamge Perera
2009-05-19
19:30 UTC+3

Al-Kuwait	1–0	(Jordan) Al-Wahdat
J. Al Hussain 45' (pen.)	(Report) (Summary)

Al Kuwait SC Stadium, Kuwait City
Attendance: 1,500
Referee: (Bahrain) Nawaf Shukralla

==== Group E ====
Team	Pld	W	D	L	GF	GA	GD	Pts	MAJ	DEM	MHQ	FAI
(Syria) Al-Majd	6	4	1	1	12	9	+3	13		2–1	1–1	4–3
(India) Dempo	6	3	1	2	10	8	+2	10	1–0		0–1	3–1
(Bahrain) Al-Muharraq	6	1	3	2	7	8	−1	6	2–3	1–1		0–0
(Jordan) Al-Faisaly	6	1	1	4	11	15	−4	4	1–2	3–4	3–2	

Al-Majd were found guilty of fielding an ineligible player (Khaled Mansoor Al Baba) in four matches (vs. Al Faisaly (JOR) on 07.04.2009 and 21.04.2009; vs. Dempo SC (IND) on 05.05.2009 and vs. Muharraq (BHR) on 19.05.2009) of the AFC Cup. All these matches have been awarded 3–0 to the teams who played against Al Majd and the club has been fined US$4000 for every match. The player was ineligible because he was registered by the club outside the recognized window(s) for registration as provided for by FIFA and AFC. Al Majd's fine was later withdrawn after appeal.

2009-03-10
16:00 UTC+5:30

Dempo (India)	1–0	(Syria) Al-Majd
Ranty Martins 24'	(Report) (Summary)

Pandit Jawaharlal Nehru Stadium, Goa
Attendance: 4,000
Referee: (Maldives) Ali Saleem
2009-03-10
18:15 UTC+3

Al-Muharraq (Bahrain)	0–0	(Jordan) Al-Faisaly
	(Report) (Summary)

Bahrain National Stadium, Manama
Attendance: 1,000
Referee: (Lebanon) Mohamad Mansour

2009-03-17
17:00 UTC+3

Al-Faisaly (Jordan)	3–4	(India) Dempo
Mo'ayyad Salim 55'; Mo'ayyad Abu Keshek 72', 75'	(Report) (Summary)	Clifford Miranda 23'; Anthony Pereira 24'; Ranty Martins 43', 70'

Amman International Stadium, Amman
Attendance: 1,500
Referee: (Iraq) Ala Abdul Kadir Nema
2009-03-17
20:00 UTC+3

Al-Majd (Syria)	1–1	(Bahrain) Al-Muharraq
Mohamed Al Zeno 80'	(Report) (Summary)	Mohamed Salmeen 31'

Abbasiyyin Stadium, Damascus
Attendance: 8,000
Referee: (Kyrgyzstan) Mashentsev Dmitry

2009-04-07
18:45 UTC+3

Al-Muharraq (Bahrain)	1–1	(India) Dempo
Mohamed Salmeen 90+5'	(Report) (Summary)	Roberto Mendes Silva 77'

Bahrain National Stadium, Manama
Attendance: 850
Referee: (Qatar) Banjar Al-Dosari
2009-04-07
18:00 UTC+3

Al-Faisaly (Jordan)	1–2	(Syria) Al-Majd
Abdel-Hadi Al-Maharmeh 59'	(Report) (Summary)	Mohamed Al Zeno 23' (pen.), 67'

Amman International Stadium, Amman
Attendance: 1,600
Referee: (Yemen) Ali Saleh

2009-04-21
16:00 UTC+5:30

Dempo (India)	0–1	(Bahrain) Al-Muharraq
	(Report) (Summary)	Husam Mubarak 90'

Pandit Jawaharlal Nehru Stadium, Goa
Attendance: 6,000
Referee: (Vietnam) Vo Minh Tri
2009-04-21
20:00 UTC+3

Al-Majd (Syria)	4–3	(Jordan) Al-Faisaly
Bashar Kaddour 18'; Abdulhadi Al Hariri 81', 89', 90+4'	(Report) (Summary)	Razzaq Farhan 68'; Mo'ayyad Salim 70'; Mo'ayyad Abu Keshek 89' (pen.)

Abbasiyyin Stadium, Damascus
Attendance: 2,350
Referee: (Japan) Kenji Ogiya

2009-05-05
18:00 UTC+3

Al-Faisaly (Jordan)	3–2	(Bahrain) Al-Muharraq
Abdel-Hadi Al-Maharmeh 10'; Razzaq Farhan 38'; Mo'ayyad Abu Keshek 81' (pen.)	(Report) (Summary)	Rashid Al-Dosari 14'; Abdulla Al Dakeel 65'

Amman International Stadium, Amman
Attendance: 2,000
Referee: (Saudi Arabia) Ibrahim Al Zahrani
2009-05-05
20:00 UTC+3

Al-Majd (Syria)	2–1	(India) Dempo
Abdulhadi Al Hariri 41'; Kenan Al Nama 62'	(Report) (Summary)	Roberto Mendes Silva 67'

Abbasiyyin Stadium, Damascus
Attendance: 2,700
Referee: (Kuwait) Atallah Al Enezi

2009-05-19
16:00 UTC+5:30

Dempo (India)	3–1	(Jordan) Al-Faisaly
Ranty Martins 1', 52' (pen.); Roberto Mendes Silva 67'	(Report) (Summary)	Mo'ayyad Abu Keshek 35' (pen.)

Pandit Jawaharlal Nehru Stadium, Goa
Attendance: 3,000
Referee: (Uzbekistan) Vladislav Tseytlin
2009-05-19
19:00 UTC+3

Al-Muharraq (Bahrain)	2–3	(Syria) Al-Majd
Julliano De Paula 20' (pen.); Ebrahim Al Mishkhas 34'	(Report) (Summary)	Samer Awad 23', 39'; Iyad Awead 68'

Bahrain National Stadium, Manama
Attendance: 385
Referee: (Iran) Saeid Mozaffarizadeh

=== East Asia ===
==== Group F ====
Team	Pld	W	D	L	GF	GA	GD	Pts	SC	MED	VB	JFC
(Hong Kong) South China	6	5	1	0	15	5	+10	16		3–0	2–1	2–0
(Indonesia) PSMS Medan	6	4	1	1	9	7	+2	13	2–2		1–0	3–1
(Maldives) VB	6	1	1	4	5	7	−2	4	1–2	1–2		2–0
(Malaysia) Johor FC	6	0	1	5	2	12	−10	1	1–4	0–1	0–0	

2009-03-10
20:45 UTC+8

Johor FC (Malaysia)	0–0	(Maldives) VB
	Report

Pasir Gudang Corporation Stadium, Pasir Gudang
Attendance: 350
Referee: Choi Myung-Yong (Korea Rep.)
2009-03-10
20:00 UTC+8

South China (Hong Kong)	3–0	(Indonesia) PSMS Medan
Li Haiqiang 21'; Chan Siu Ki 45+'; Cacá 58'	Report

Mong Kok Stadium, Hong Kong
Attendance: 3,207
Referee: Vo Minh Tri (Vietnam)

2009-03-17
16:00 UTC+5

VB (Maldives)	1–2	(Hong Kong) South China
Ashfaq 28'	Report	Schutz 49', 90'

National Stadium, Malé
Attendance: 7,000
Referee: Banjar Al-Dosari (Qatar)
2009-03-17
19:00 UTC+7

PSMS Medan (Indonesia)	3–1	(Malaysia) Johor FC
Aiboy 53', 65'; Zada 55'	Report	Azuwad 21'

Jakabaring Stadium, Palembang
Attendance: 1,500
Referee: Hettikamkanamge Perera (Sri Lanka)

2009-04-07
20:00 UTC+8

South China (Hong Kong)	2–0	(Malaysia) Johor FC
Man Pei Tak 15'; Cacá 55'	Report

Mong Kok Stadium, Hong Kong
Attendance: 3,791
Referee: Win Cho (Myanmar)
2009-04-07
19:00 UTC+7

PSMS Medan (Indonesia)	1–0	(Maldives) VB
Carbiny 77'	Report

Jakabaring Stadium, Palembang
Attendance: 500
Referee: Rustam Kholov (Tajikistan)

2009-04-21
17:00 UTC+8

Johor FC (Malaysia)	1–4	(Hong Kong) South China
Eddy 51'	Report	Cacá 29', 90'; Schutz 47'; Chan Chi Hong 66'

Pasir Gudang Corporation Stadium, Pasir Gudang
Attendance: 500
Referee: Huang Junjie (China)
2009-04-21
16:00 UTC+5

VB (Maldives)	1–2	(Indonesia) PSMS Medan
Lareef 31'	Report	Costas 8'; Afandi 33'

National Stadium, Malé
Attendance: 1500
Referee: Zhao Liang (China)

2009-05-05
16:00 UTC+5

VB (Maldives)	2–0	(Malaysia) Johor FC
Mansaray 20'; Hussain 39'	Report

National Stadium, Malé
Attendance: 2,187
Referee: Vo Minh Tri (Vietnam)
2009-05-05
19:00 UTC+7

PSMS Medan (Indonesia)	2–2	(Hong Kong) South China
Maniani 52'; Carbiny 90'	Report	Cacá 48', 71'

Jakabaring Stadium, Palembang
Attendance: 300
Referee: Kenji Ogiya (Japan)

2009-05-19
20:45 UTC+8

Johor FC (Malaysia)	0–1	(Indonesia) PSMS Medan
	Report	Leonardo 67'

Pasir Gudang Corporation Stadium, Pasir Gudang
Attendance: 100
Referee: Alaa Al-Abadee (Iraq)
2009-05-19
20:00 UTC+8

South China (Hong Kong)	2–1	(Maldives) VB
Chan Siu Ki 4'; Wong Chin Hung 58'	Report	Mansaray 17'

Mong Kok Stadium, Hong Kong
Attendance: 1,071
Referee: Kadhim Oda Lazeem (Iraq)

==== Group G ====
Pos	Team	Pld	W	D	L	GF	GA	GD	Pts	Qualification	CHO	KED	EAS	HAN
1	(Thailand) Chonburi	6	5	0	1	17	4	+13	15	Advance to knockout stage		3–1	4–1	6–0
2	(Malaysia) Kedah	6	2	1	3	14	10	+4	7	Advance to knockout stage	0–1		2–0	7–0
3	(Hong Kong) Eastern	6	2	1	3	9	13	−4	7		2–1	3–3		3–0
4	(Vietnam) Hanoi ACB	6	2	0	4	6	19	−13	6		0–2	3–1	3–0	

2009-03-10
18:30 UTC+7

Chonburi (Thailand)	4–1	(Hong Kong) Eastern
Panjaroen 8'; Kone 45'; On-Mo 56'; Jinta 76'	Report	Wong Chun Yue 56'

Suphachalasai Stadium, Bangkok
Attendance: 3,000
Referee: Andre El Haddad (Lebanon)
2009-03-10
17:00 UTC+7

Hanoi ACB (Vietnam)	3–1	(Malaysia) Kedah
Gajić 60'; Phạm Thành Lương 62'; Trương Huỳnh Điệp 83'	Report	Baddrol 90'

Hàng Đẫy Stadium, Hanoi
Attendance: 1,000
Referee: Win Cho (Myanmar)

2009-03-17
20:00 UTC+8

Eastern (Hong Kong)	3–0	(Vietnam) Hanoi ACB
Le Manh Hung 16' (o.g.); Wong Chun Yue 40'; Yeung Ching Kwong 58'	Report

Mong Kok Stadium, Hong Kong
Attendance: 616
Referee: Fan Qi (China)
2009-03-17
20:45 UTC+8

Kedah (Malaysia)	0–1	(Thailand) Chonburi
	Report	Kone 31'

Darul Aman Stadium, Kedah
Attendance: 4,500
Referee: Zhao Liang (China)

2009-04-07
17:00 UTC+7

Hanoi ACB (Vietnam)	0–2	(Thailand) Chonburi
	Report	Sunthornpit 52'; Inthasen 60'

Hàng Đẫy Stadium, Hanoi
Attendance: 2,000
Referee: Hajime Matsuo (Japan)
2009-04-07
20:45 UTC+8

Kedah (Malaysia)	2–0	(Hong Kong) Eastern
Farizal 27'; Azrul 77'	Report

Darul Aman Stadium, Kedah
Attendance: 500
Referee: Oda Lazeem Kadhim (Iraq)

2009-04-21
18:30 UTC+7

Chonburi (Thailand)	6–0	(Vietnam) Hanoi ACB
Jinta 15'; Kone 21'; On-Mo 45'; Sukha 65'; Anderson 68'; Panjaroen 90'	Report

Suphachalasai Stadium, Bangkok
Attendance: 3,278
Referee: Jahanbazi Yadollah (Iraq)
2009-04-21
20:00 UTC+8

Eastern (Hong Kong)	3–3	(Malaysia) Kedah
Machado 70'; Wong Chun Yue 80'; Pau Ka Yiu 90'	Report	Khyril 32', 85'; Sabree 60'

Mong Kok Stadium, Hong Kong
Attendance: 460
Referee: Mohamad Mansour (Lebanon)

2009-05-05
20:00 UTC+8

Eastern (Hong Kong)	2–1	(Thailand) Chonburi
Yang Xu 71'; Akosah 85'	Report	Inthasen 29'

Mong Kok Stadium, Hong Kong
Attendance: 575
Referee: Yu Ming-hsun (Chinese Taipei)
2009-05-05
20:45 UTC+8

Kedah (Malaysia)	7–0	(Vietnam) Hanoi ACB
Azrul 13', 30', 79' (pen.); Farizal 34'; Afif 64'; Sabree 69'	Report

Darul Aman Stadium, Kedah
Attendance: 2,800
Referee: Orzuev Dilovarshokh (Tajikistan)

2009-05-19
18:30 UTC+7

Chonburi (Thailand)	3–1	(Malaysia) Kedah
On-Mo 14', 40'; Douglas 85'	Report	Khyril 35'

Suphachalasai Stadium, Bangkok
Attendance: 1,500
Referee: Ali Saleem (Maldives)
2009-05-19
17:00 UTC+7

Hanoi ACB (Vietnam)	3–0	(Hong Kong) Eastern
Nguyen Hai Nam 10' (pen.); Gajić 43', 71'	Report

Hàng Đẫy Stadium, Hanoi
Attendance: 500
Referee: Banjar Al-Dosari (Qatar)

==== Group H ====
Team	Pld	W	D	L	GF	GA	GD	Pts	BD	HU	PEA	VAL
(Vietnam) Binh Duong	6	4	1	1	15	4	+11	13		2–0	1–1	3–0
(Singapore) Home United	6	4	0	2	12	7	+5	12	2–1		3–1	5–1
(Thailand) PEA	6	3	1	2	12	10	+2	10	1–3	2–1		4–1
(Maldives) Club Valencia	6	0	0	6	3	21	−18	0	0–5	0–1	1–3	

2009-03-10
19:30 UTC+8

Home United (Singapore)	2–1	(Vietnam) Bình Dương
Jumaat 45+1'; Ludovick 59'	Report	Kesley 74'

Jalan Besar Stadium, Singapore
Attendance: 1,840
Referee: Hajime Matsuo (Japan)
2009-03-10
16:00 UTC+5

Club Valencia (Maldives)	1–3	(Thailand) PEA
Ibrahim Shiyam 48'	Report	Richard Falcão 14' (pen.), 86'; Singto 42'

National Stadium, Malé
Attendance: 4,500
Referee: Yadollah Jahanbazi (Iran)

2009-03-17
18:00 UTC+7

Bình Dương (Vietnam)	3–0	(Maldives) Club Valencia
Luong Minh Trung 13'; Mohamed Jameel 35' (o.g.); Kesley 63'	Report

Gò Đậu Stadium, Thủ Dầu Một
Attendance: 12,000
Referee: Liu Kwok Man (Hong Kong)
2009-03-17
19.00 UTC+7

PEA (Thailand)	2–1	(Singapore) Home United
Vachiraban 57'; Jinajai 65'	Report	Shi J.Y. 24'

Suphachalasai Stadium, Bangkok
Attendance: 1,500
Referee: Lee Min-Hu (Korea Rep.)

2009-04-07
16:00 UTC+5

Club Valencia (Maldives)	0–1	(Singapore) Home United
	Report	Peres 69'

National Stadium, Malé
Attendance: 5,012
Referee: Fan Qi (China)
2009-04-07
19.00 UTC+7

PEA (Thailand)	1–3	(Vietnam) Bình Dương
Jinajai 46'	Report	Philani 22'; Umarin 35' (o.g.); Kesley 89'

Suphachalasai Stadium, Bangkok
Attendance: 300
Referee: Mohamad Mansour (Lebanon)

2009-04-21
19:30 UTC+8

Home United (Singapore)	5–1	(Maldives) Club Valencia
Firdaus 3'; Peres 7'; Ludovick 23', 78'; Jumaat 36'	Report	Nkemi Marcelin 64'

Jalan Besar Stadium, Singapore
Attendance: 809
Referee: Andre El Haddad (Lebanon)
2009-04-21
18:00 UTC+7

Bình Dương (Vietnam)	1–1	(Thailand) PEA
Nguyen Anh Duc 90'	Report	Vachiraban 59'

Gò Đậu Stadium, Thủ Dầu Một
Attendance: 15,000
Referee: Orzuev Dilovarshokh (Tajikistan)

2009-05-05
18:00 UTC+7

Bình Dương (Vietnam)	2–0	(Singapore) Home United
Kesley 62'; Nguyen Duc Thien 78'	Report

Gò Đậu Stadium, Thủ Dầu Một
Attendance: 18,800
Referee: Ng Chiu Kok (Hong Kong)
2009-05-05
19.00 UTC+7

PEA (Thailand)	4–1	(Maldives) Club Valencia
Singto 22', 45'; Rangsiyo 57'; Viwatchaichok 88'	Report	Rilwan Waheed 56' (pen.)

Suphachalasai Stadium, Bangkok
Attendance: 1,000
Referee: Ali Al Yarimi (Yemen)

2009-05-19
19:30 UTC+8

Home United (Singapore)	3–1	(Thailand) PEA
Oliveira 45'; Firdaus 67', 86'	Report	Vachiraban 56'

Jalan Besar Stadium, Singapore
Attendance: 989
Referee: Sgt. Win Cho (Myanmar)
2009-05-19
16:00 UTC+5

Club Valencia (Maldives)	0–5	(Vietnam) Bình Dương
	Report	Nguyen Vu Phong 2', 37'; Nguyen Anh Duc 21'; Huynh Quang Thanh 29'; Nguyen Duc Thien 77'

National Stadium, Malé
Attendance: 400
Referee: Mohd Nafeez Bin Abdul Wahab (Malaysia)
