= 2009 in Malaysian football =

Football in Malaysia
- Season: 2009

Men's football
- Super League: Selangor
- Premier League: Harimau Muda
- FAM League: Pos Malaysia FC
- FA Cup: Selangor
- Malaysia Cup: Negeri Sembilan
- Community Shield: Selangor

The 2009 season of competitive association football in Malaysia.

== Promotion and relegation ==
=== Pre-season ===
League	Promoted to league	Relegated from league
Liga Super	Kuala Muda Naza; PLUS; Kelantan	Sarawak
Liga Premier	SDMS Kepala Batas; T-Team; MBJB	

== New and withdrawn teams ==
=== New teams ===
- Penjara (FAM League)
- (Kuala Lumpur) Pos Malaysia (FAM League)
- (Selangor) UiTM (FAM League)
- (Penang) Universiti Sains Malaysia Staff (FAM League)

=== Withdrawn teams ===
- (Brunei) DPMM^{1}

Note:
1 Excluded from the competition as per FIFA rules after Football Association of Brunei Darussalam was deregistered by the Registrar of Societies.

== National team ==
Win Draw Lose

=== Malaysia National Football Team ===
==== 2011 AFC Asian Cup qualification ====
Team	Pld	W	D	L	GF	GA	GD	Pts	(United Arab Emirates)	(Uzbekistan)	(Malaysia)
United Arab Emirates	4	3	0	1	7	1	+6	9	—	0–1	1–0
Uzbekistan	4	3	0	1	7	3	+4	9	0–1	—	3–1
Malaysia	4	0	0	4	2	12	−10	0	0–5	1–3	—

21 January 2009	Malaysia	0–5	United Arab Emirates	KLFA Stadium, Kuala Lumpur
20:45 UTC+8		Report	Omar 29', 45+1' (pen.); Matar 62', 76'; A. Khalil 85'	Attendance: 10,000; Referee: Ben Williams (Australia)

14 November 2009	Uzbekistan	3–1	Malaysia	JAR Stadium, Tashkent
16:00 UTC+5	Djeparov 46'; Geynrikh 57', 65'	Report	Zaquan Adha 68'	Attendance: 5,000; Referee: Masoud Moradi (Iran)

18 November 2009	Malaysia	1–3	Uzbekistan	National Stadium, Kuala Lumpur
17:30 UTC+8	Bakhtiar 73'	Report	Gafurov 33'; Nasimov 59'; Kapadze 74'	Attendance: 2,000; Referee: Tan Hai (China PR)

Note: The second match between United Arab Emirates against Malaysia is held on 6 January 2010

==== International Friendlies ====
12 July 2009 Friendly	Malaysia	4–0	Zimbabwe	Cheras, Kuala Lumpur
	Safiq 45' (pen.); Indra Putra 50'; Farderin 85'; Norshahrul 90'			Stadium: KLFA Stadium

14 July 2009 Friendly	Malaysia	1–0	Zimbabwe	Shah Alam, Selangor
17:30 UTC+8	V. Thirumurugan 40'			Stadium: Shah Alam Stadium

18 July 2009 Friendly	Malaysia	2–3	(England) Manchester United	Bukit Jalil, Kuala Lumpur
17:30 UTC+8	Amri 45', 52'		Rooney 8'; Nani 27'; Owen 85'	Stadium: National Stadium Bukit Jalil

20 July 2009 Friendly	Malaysia	0–2	(England) Manchester United	Bukit Jalil, Kuala Lumpur
20:45 UTC+8			Macheda 11'; Owen 13'	Stadium: National Stadium Bukit Jalil

8 August 2009 Friendly	Malaysia	3–1	Kedah FA	Alor Setar, Kedah
	Zaquan; Amirul; Norshahrul			Stadium: Darul Aman Stadium

12 August 2009 Friendly	Malaysia	0–0	Kenya	Shah Alam, Selangor
				Stadium: Shah Alam Stadium

15 August 2009 Friendly	Malaysia	0–0	China	Shah Alam, Selangor
				Stadium: Shah Alam Stadium

20 August 2009 Friendly	Saudi Arabia	2–1	Malaysia	Riyadh
			Shakir 85'	Stadium: King Fahd International Stadium

5 September 2009 Friendly	Jordan	0–0	Malaysia	Amman
				Stadium: King Abdullah II Stadium

11 September 2009 Friendly	Malaysia	5–0	Lesotho	Cheras, Kuala Lumpur
	Zaquan 41'; Norshahrul 44'; Manaf 78', 90'; Amirul 88'			Stadium: KLFA Stadium

5 November 2009 Friendly	Malaysia	2–1	Kuala Lumpur FA	Cheras, Kuala Lumpur
	Norshahrul 28'; Safiq 36'			Stadium: KLFA Stadium

26 November 2009 Friendly	Malaysia	0–1	Maldives	Shah Alam, Selangor
				Stadium: UiTM Stadium

30 December 2009 Friendly	Malaysia	4–1	Syria	Cheras, Kuala Lumpur, Kuala Lumpur
	Safiq 31' (pen.), 63' (pen.); Zaquan 77'; K. Gurusamy 90'			Stadium: KLFA Stadium

=== Malaysia National under-23 football team ===
==== 2009 Southeast Asian Games ====
===== Group stage =====
Team	Pld	W	D	L	GF	GA	GD	Pts
Vietnam	4	3	1	0	14	3	+11	10
Malaysia	4	3	0	1	18	4	+14	9
Thailand	4	2	1	1	15	3	+12	7
Cambodia	4	1	0	3	5	15	−10	3
Timor-Leste	4	0	0	4	1	28	−27	0

2 December 2009	Malaysia	11–0	Timor-Leste	New Laos National Stadium, Vientiane
15:00	Norshahrul 3', 30'; Baddrol 12'; Zaquan 15'; Safiq 28'; Fakri 40', 70', 76'; Aidil 57'; Amirul 80'; Amar 90+2'	Report

6 December 2009	Vietnam	3–1	Malaysia	New Laos National Stadium, Vientiane
15:00	Phan Thanh Bình 13'; Mai Tiến Thành 25'; Nguyễn Trọng Hoàng 45+3'	Report	Võ Hoàng Quảng 26' (o.g.)

8 December 2009	Cambodia	0–4	Malaysia	Laos National Stadium, Vientiane
17:45		Report	Manaf 36'; Norshahrul 77'; S. Kunalan 82'; Safiq 86'

11 December 2009	Malaysia	2–1	Thailand	New Laos National Stadium, Vientiane
15:00 UTC+7	Nasriq 81'; Fakri 90+2'	Report	Arthit 53'

===== Semi-final =====
14 December 2009	Laos	1–3	Malaysia	New Laos National Stadium, Vientiane
19:00	Sysomvang 74'		Baddrol 14', 78'; Safiq 85'

===== Gold-medal match =====
17 December 2009	Vietnam	0–1	Malaysia	New Laos National Stadium, Vientiane
17:00			Mai Xuân Hợp 85' (o.g.)	Referee: Pratap Singh (India)

=== Malaysia national under-19 football team ===
==== 2009 AFF U-19 Youth Championship ====
===== Group stage =====
Team	Pld	W	D	L	GF	GA	GD	Pts
Vietnam	3	3	0	0	8	2	+6	9
Malaysia	3	2	0	1	9	3	+6	6
Myanmar	3	1	0	2	4	5	−1	3
Timor-Leste	3	0	0	3	2	13	−11	0

4 August 2009	Malaysia	0–2	Vietnam	Thong Nhat Stadium
17:45		Report	Nguyen Dinh Bao 47'; Nguyen Van Quyet 61'

6 August 2009	Timor-Leste	1–7	Malaysia	Thanh Long Centre
15:30	unknown ?'	Report	A. Thamil Arasu 18' (pen.), 33', 73' (pen.), 84', 87'; Mohd Fandi Othman 24'; Mohd Fadhli Mohd Shas 82'	Referee: Allan Martinez (Philippines)

8 August 2009	Malaysia	2–0	Myanmar	Thong Nhat Stadium
17:45	Saiful Ridzuwan Selamat 8'; Wan Zack Haikal 14'	Report

===== Semi final =====
10 August 2009	Thailand	1–0	Malaysia	Thanh Long Stadium
15:15	Surachet Ngamtip 55'	Report

===== Third place play-off =====
12 August 2009	Malaysia	0–3	Vietnam	Thanh Long Stadium
15:30		Report	Nguyen Tan Tai 26'; Le Quoc Phuong 35'; Ha Minh Tuan 68'

=== Malaysia national under-16 football team ===
==== 2010 AFC U-16 Championship qualification ====
===== Group stage =====
Team	Pld	W	D	L	GF	GA	GD	Pts
Australia	4	3	1	0	17	3	+14	10
Laos	4	1	1	2	10	17	−7	4
Malaysia	4	0	2	2	7	14	−7	2

8 October 2009	Malaysia	0–6	Laos	McKellar Park, Canberra
19:00 UTC+10		Report	Khanthavong 10'; Saysana 19', 40', 73'; Chanchaleune 45+3'; Sayalath 86'	Attendance: 200; Referee: Hajime Matsuo (Japan)

10 October 2009	Australia	2–2	Malaysia	McKellar Park, Canberra
19:00 UTC+10	Ilic 12'; Gallifuoco 71'	Report	Syafiq 75'; Nazmi Faiz 85'	Attendance: 300; Referee: Ng Chiu Kok (Hong Kong)

14 October 2009	Laos	4–4	Malaysia	McKellar Park, Canberra
19:00 UTC+10	Saysana 16', 66'; Pula 30' (o.g.); Sihavong 70' (pen.)	Report	Syazwan 32', 50'; Akhir¡ 40' (pen.); Akmal 63'	Attendance: 100; Referee: Ng Chiu Kok (Hong Kong)

16 October 2009	Malaysia	1–2	Australia	McKellar Park, Canberra
19:00 UTC+10	Akmal 44'	Report	Makarounas 9'; Degenek 33'	Attendance: 300; Referee: Pandian Palaniyandi (Singapore)

== League season ==
=== Super League ===
Pos	Team	Pld	W	D	L	GF	GA	GD	Pts	Qualification or relegation
1	Selangor (C)	26	20	3	3	64	21	+43	63	Champion / Qualification to AFC Cup
2	Perlis	26	17	5	4	40	19	+21	56	
3	Kedah	26	16	3	7	45	28	+17	51	
4	Johor FC	26	15	3	8	53	27	+26	48	
5	Terengganu	26	15	2	9	46	29	+17	47	
6	Kelantan	26	14	2	10	49	36	+13	44	
7	Negeri Sembilan	26	11	5	10	44	35	+9	38	
8	PLUS	26	11	5	10	35	26	+9	38	
9	Kuala Muda Naza	26	12	1	13	32	41	−9	37	Withdraw from league and dissolved. (Note: Kuala Muda Naza and UPB-MyTeam withdrew before the start of 2010 season.)
10	Perak	26	9	5	12	27	36	−9	32	
11	UPB-MyTeam	26	9	3	14	28	49	−21	30	Withdraw from league and dissolved.
12	Penang	26	5	4	17	29	55	−26	19	
13	Pahang	26	5	2	19	31	62	−31	17	
14	PDRM (R)	26	0	3	23	19	75	−56	3	Relegated to Liga Premier

Source: Results TM Liga Super and Rec.Sport.Soccer Statistics Foundation
(C) Champions; (R) Relegated

=== Premier League ===
Pos	Team	Pld	W	D	L	GF	GA	GD	Pts	Qualification or relegation
1	Harimau Muda (Note: Harimau Muda is a national developmental football team restricted to playing in the Premier League, therefore they were not promoted.)	24	20	2	2	49	16	+33	62	
2	T-Team	24	17	6	1	58	11	+47	57	Promoted to Malaysia Super League
3	Johor	24	16	3	5	48	15	+33	51	Promoted to Malaysia Super League
4	Kuala Lumpur (Note: Kuala Lumpur was later promoted to Super League to keep the team number balanced after Kuala Muda Naza and UPB-MyTeam withdrawal from Super League for 2010 season.)	24	14	5	5	46	18	+28	47	Promoted to Malaysia Super League
5	Proton	24	12	4	8	40	25	+15	40	Withrew from Premier League and dissolved.
6	Felda United	24	10	7	7	29	23	+6	37	
7	PKNS	24	8	7	9	20	24	−4	31	
8	Shahzan Muda	23	6	6	11	27	35	−8	24	
9	Sabah	24	5	7	12	18	31	−13	22	
10	ATM	24	5	6	13	19	52	−33	21	
11	Malacca	24	3	9	12	17	32	−15	18	
12	Sarawak	24	3	6	15	29	57	−28	15	
13	SDMS Kepala Batas	24	1	4	19	9	71	−62	7	Relegated to Malaysia FAM League
14	MBJB (Note: All games involving MBJB were declared null and void after the FAM competitions committee on Tuesday 24 March turned down MBJB’s appeal against the decision to expel them from the league for failure to settle insurance premium payments for their players and officials.)	0	0	0	0	0	0	0	0	Disqualified

Source: Rec.Sport.Soccer Statistics Foundation
Rules for classification: 1) Points; 2) Goal difference; 3) Number of goals scored.

=== FAM League ===
Pos	Team	Pld	W	D	L	GF	GA	GD	Pts	Qualification or relegation
1	Pos Malaysia	14	9	3	2	29	11	+18	30	Promoted to 2010 Malaysia Premier League
2	KSK Tambun Tulang (Note: Declined promotion to Premier League)	14	7	5	2	21	8	+13	26	
3	Universiti Sains Malaysia Staff	14	7	4	3	28	13	+15	25	Promoted to 2010 Malaysia Premier League
4	Majlis Perbandaran Muar	14	6	4	4	19	13	+6	22	Promoted to 2010 Malaysia Premier League
5	UiTM Pahang	14	6	3	5	25	18	+7	21	
6	Juara Ban Huo Leong Sports Club	14	4	1	9	7	25	−18	13	
7	Penjara	14	2	3	9	18	37	−19	9	Withdrew from 2010 Malaysia FAM League
8	Melodi Jaya Sports Club	14	2	3	9	11	31	−20	9	

Source: Rec.Sport.Soccer Statistics Foundation
Rules for classification: 1) Points; 2) Goal difference; 3) Number of goals scored.

== Domestic Cups ==
=== Charity Shield ===
3 January 2009	Kedah	1–4	Selangor	Darul Aman Stadium, Kedah
20:45 UTC+8	Khyril Muhymeen 89'		Amri Yahyah 4', 36'; Zameer Zainun 31'; Safee Sali 58'

=== FA Cup ===
==== Final ====
25 April 2009	Kelantan	1 – 1 (a.e.t.) (1–4 p)	Selangor	National Stadium Bukit Jalil, Kuala Lumpur
20:45 UTC+8	Norfarhan 93'	Report	Amri 101'	Attendance: 92,000; Referee: (Malaysia) Subkhiddin Mohd Salleh
	Penalties
	(penalty missed) Indra; (penalty scored) Ezrie; (penalty missed) Zairol		Khairul (penalty scored); Nasriq (penalty scored); Surendran (penalty scored); Safee (penalty scored)

- Selangor FA win 4–1 on penalties

=== Malaysia Cup ===
==== Final ====
7 November 2009	Kelantan	1–3	Negeri Sembilan	National Stadium Bukit Jalil, Kuala Lumpur
20:45 UTC+8	Indra Putra 90+'		Shahurain 18'; Hairuddin 46'; Zaquan Adha 60'	Attendance: 95,000; Referee: Mohd Yusof Mat Karim (Tentera)

== Malaysian clubs in Asia ==
=== Kedah ===
==== AFC Cup ====
===== Group stage =====
Pos	Team	Pld	W	D	L	GF	GA	GD	Pts	Qualification
1	(Thailand) Chonburi	6	5	0	1	17	4	+13	15	Advance to knockout stage
2	(Malaysia) Kedah	6	2	1	3	14	10	+4	7	Advance to knockout stage
3	(Hong Kong) Eastern	6	2	1	3	9	13	−4	7	
4	(Vietnam) Hanoi ACB	6	2	0	4	6	19	−13	6	

10 March 2009	Hanoi ACB (Vietnam)	3–1	(Malaysia) Kedah	Hàng Đẫy Stadium, Hanoi
17:00 UTC+7	Gajić 60'; Phạm Thành Lương 62'; Trương Huỳnh Điệp 83'	Report	Baddrol 90'	Attendance: 1,000; Referee: Win Cho (Myanmar)

17 March 2009	Kedah (Malaysia)	0–1	(Thailand) Chonburi	Darul Aman Stadium, Kedah
20:45 UTC+8		Report	Kone 31'	Attendance: 4,500; Referee: Zhao Liang (China)

7 April 2009	Kedah (Malaysia)	2–0	(Hong Kong) Eastern	Darul Aman Stadium, Kedah
20:45 UTC+8	Farizal 27'; Azrul 77'	Report		Attendance: 500; Referee: Oda Lazeem Kadhim (Iraq)

21 April 2009	Eastern (Hong Kong)	3–3	(Malaysia) Kedah	Mong Kok Stadium, Hong Kong
20:00 UTC+8	Machado 70'; Wong Chun Yue 80'; Pau Ka Yiu 90'	Report	Khyril 32', 85'; Sabree 60'	Attendance: 460; Referee: Mohamad Mansour (Lebanon)

5 May 2009	Kedah (Malaysia)	7–0	(Vietnam) Hanoi ACB	Darul Aman Stadium, Kedah
20:45 UTC+8	Azrul 13', 30', 79' (pen.); Farizal 34'; Afif 64'; Sabree 69'	Report		Attendance: 2,800; Referee: Orzuev Dilovarshokh (Tajikistan)

19 May 2009	Chonburi (Thailand)	3–1	(Malaysia) Kedah	Suphachalasai Stadium, Bangkok
18:30 UTC+7	On-Mo 14', 40'; Douglas 85'	Report	Khyril 35'	Attendance: 1,500; Referee: Ali Saleem (Maldives)

===== Knockout stage =====
Round of 16

23 June 2009	Bình Dương (Vietnam)	8–2	(Malaysia) Kedah	Gò Đậu Stadium, Thủ Dầu Một
18:00 UTC+7	Helio 17'; Nguyễn Vũ Phong 19'; Kesley 39', 70', 81', 90+2'; Nguyễn Đức Thiện 41'; Nguyễn Anh Đức 78'	Report	Shahrul 69'; Azrul 89' (pen.)	Attendance: 18,000; Referee: Minoru Tojo (Japan)

=== Johor ===
==== AFC Cup ====
===== Group stage =====
Team	Pld	W	D	L	GF	GA	GD	Pts
(Hong Kong) South China	6	5	1	0	15	5	+10	16
(Indonesia) PSMS Medan	6	4	1	1	9	7	+2	13
(Maldives) VB	6	1	1	4	5	7	−2	4
(Malaysia) Johor FC	6	0	1	5	2	12	−10	1

10 March 2009	Johor FC (Malaysia)	0–0	(Maldives) VB	Pasir Gudang Corporation Stadium, Johor
20:45 UTC+8		Report		Attendance: 350; Referee: Choi Myung-Yong (Korea Rep.)

17 March 2009	PSMS Medan (Indonesia)	3–1	(Malaysia) Johor FC	Jakabaring Stadium, Palembang
19:00 UTC+7	Aiboy 53', 65'; Zada 55'	Report	Azuwad 21'	Attendance: 1,500; Referee: Hettikamkanamge Perera (Sri Lanka)

7 March 2009	South China (Hong Kong)	2–0	(Malaysia) Johor FC	Mong Kok Stadium, Hong Kong
20:00 UTC+8	Man Pei Tak 15'; Cacá 55'	Report		Attendance: 3,791; Referee: Win Cho (Myanmar)

21 April 2009	Johor FC (Malaysia)	1–4	(Hong Kong) South China	Pasir Gudang Corporation Stadium, Johor
17:00 UTC+8	Eddy 51'	Report	Cacá 29', 90'; Schutz 47'; Chan Chi Hong 66'	Attendance: 500; Referee: Huang Junjie (China)

5 May 2009	VB (Maldives)	2–0	(Malaysia) Johor FC	National Stadium, Malé
16:00 UTC+5	Mansaray 20'; Hussain 39'	Report		Attendance: 2,187; Referee: Vo Minh Tri (Vietnam)

19 May 2009	Johor FC (Malaysia)	0–1	(Indonesia) PSMS Medan	Pasir Gudang Corporation Stadium, Johor
20:45 UTC+8		Report	Leonardo 67'	Attendance: 100; Referee: Alaa Al-Abadee (Iraq)
