= 2009 AFC Cup knockout stage =

== Bracket ==
Round of 16
Al-Kuwait	3
(India) Dempo	1
(Iraq) Al-Zawraa	1
(Iraq) Arbil	3
(Syria) Al-Majd	0 (1)
(Uzbekistan) Neftchi Farg'ona (p)	0 (3)
(Hong Kong) South China	4
(Singapore) Home United	0
(Thailand) Chonburi	4
(Indonesia) PSMS Medan	0
(Vietnam) Binh Duong	8
(Malaysia) Kedah	2
(Bahrain) Busaiteen	1
(Syria) Al-Karamah (a.e.t.)	2
(Kuwait) Al-Arabi (a.e.t.)	2
(Lebanon) Safa	1

Quarter-finals
Al-Kuwait	1	1	2
(Iraq) Arbil	1	0	1
(Uzbekistan) Neftchi Farg'ona	5	0	5
(Hong Kong) South China (a)	4	1	5
(Thailand) Chonburi	2	0	2
(Vietnam) Binh Duong	2	2	4
(Syria) Al-Karamah (p)	0	0	0 (5)
(Kuwait) Al-Arabi	0	0	0 (4)

Semi-finals
Al-Kuwait	2	1	3
(Hong Kong) South China	1	0	1
(Vietnam) Binh Duong	2	0	2
(Syria) Al-Karamah	1	3	4

Final
Al-Kuwait	2
(Syria) Al-Karamah	1

== Round of 16 ==
The draw for the round of 16 of the 2009 AFC Cup was held on 12 January 2009, along with the draw for the group stage.

=== West Asia ===
2009-05-26
18:00 UTC+3

Al-Zawraa (Iraq)	1–3	(Iraq) Arbil
Adnan Attiya 76'	Report	Ahmad Salah 44'; Luay Salah 67'; Ahmad Abd Ali 70'

Al-Maktoum Stadium, Dubai, UAE
Attendance: 200
Referee: Abdulrahman Abdou (Qatar)

2009-05-26
18:30 UTC+3

Busaiteen (Bahrain)	1–2 (a.e.t.)	(Syria) Al-Karamah
Akaruye 57' (pen.)	Report	Al Hamawi 43'; Abbas 116'

Bahrain National Stadium, Manama
Attendance: 300
Referee: Mohammed Al Saeedi (UAE)

2009-05-26
19:30 UTC+3

Al-Kuwait	3–1	(India) Dempo
Al Hussain 21' (pen.), 58', 90+5' (pen.)	Report	Roberto Mendes Silva 73'

Al Kuwait SC Stadium, Kuwait City
Referee: Abdullah Al Hilali (Oman)

2009-05-26
20:00 UTC+3

Al-Majd (Syria)	0–0 (a.e.t.)	(Uzbekistan) Neftchi Farg'ona
	Report
Penalties
Al Zeno (penalty missed); Asaad (penalty missed); Diab (penalty scored); Kaddour (penalty missed)	1–3	(penalty scored) Boqiyev; (penalty missed) Tukhtahujaev; (penalty scored) Kholikov; (penalty scored) Nizametdinov

Abbasiyyin Stadium, Damascus
Attendance: 6,000
Referee: Tan Hai (China)

2009-05-26
20:15 UTC+3

Al-Arabi (Kuwait)	2–1 (a.e.t.)	(Lebanon) Safa
Ezukam 29'; Al Khatib 112'	Report	Al Saadi 59'

Sabah Al Salem Stadium, Kuwait City
Attendance: 3,400
Referee: Mohsen Torky (Iran)

=== East Asia ===
2009-06-23
18:00 UTC+7

Bình Dương (Vietnam)	8–2	(Malaysia) Kedah
Hélio 17'; Nguyễn Vũ Phong 19'; Kesley 39', 70', 81', 90+2'; Nguyễn Đức Thiện 41'; Nguyễn Anh Đức 78'	Report	Shahrul 69'; Azrul 89' (pen.)

Gò Đậu Stadium, Thủ Dầu Một
Attendance: 18,000
Referee: Minoru Tojo (Japan)

2009-06-23
18:30 UTC+7

Chonburi (Thailand)	4–0	(Indonesia) PSMS Medan
Kone 19', 67', 90+3'; Inthasen 87'	Report

Rajamangala Stadium, Bangkok
Attendance: 6,000
Referee: Almarzouqi Hassan (UAE)

2009-06-23
20:00 UTC+8

South China (Hong Kong)	4–0	(Singapore) Home United
Kwok Kin Pong 19'; Li Haiqiang 21', 64' (pen.); Cacá 51'	Report

Hong Kong Stadium, Hong Kong
Attendance: 8,972
Referee: Abdullah Balideh (Qatar)

== Quarter-finals ==
The draw for the quarter-finals and the remaining knockout rounds took place at Kuala Lumpur, Malaysia on June 29, 2009.

=== First leg ===
2009-09-15
18:30 UTC+7

Chonburi (Thailand)	2–2	(Vietnam) Bình Dương
On-Mo 20'; Sunthornpit 70'	Report	Huỳnh Quang Thanh 14'; Nguyễn Vũ Phong 24'

Rajamangala Stadium, Bangkok
Attendance: 4,500
Referee: Tayeb Hasan Shamsuzzaman (Bangladesh)

2009-09-15
18:00 UTC+5

Neftchi Farg'ona (Uzbekistan)	5–4	(Hong Kong) South China
Saidov 5'; Berdiyev 34', 44', 79', 90+4'	Report	Gerard 33'; Ramón 35'; Kwok Kin Pong 41'; Carrijo 84'

Neftchi Stadium, Fergana
Attendance: 13,500
Referee: Mohamed Masoud (Oman)

2009-09-15
21:00 UTC+3

Al-Kuwait	1–1	(Iraq) Arbil
Al Azemi 7'	Report	Mahdi 68'

Al Kuwait SC Stadium, Kuwait City
Attendance: 2,800
Referee: Abdul Malik (Singapore)

2009-09-15
22:00 UTC+3

Al-Karamah (Syria)	0–0	(Kuwait) Al-Arabi
	Report

Khaled bin Walid Stadium, Homs
Attendance: 30,000
Referee: Valentin Kovalenko (Uzbekistan)

=== Second leg ===
2009-09-30
18:00 UTC+7

Bình Dương (Vietnam)	2–0	(Thailand) Chonburi
Philani 57'; Molina 86'	Report

Gò Đậu Stadium, Thủ Dầu Một
Attendance: 24,000
Referee: Peter Green (Australia)

Bình Dương won 4–2 on aggregate.

2009-09-30
20:00 UTC+8

South China (Hong Kong)	1–0	(Uzbekistan) Neftchi Farg'ona
Carrijo 2'	Report

Hong Kong Stadium, Hong Kong
Attendance: 20,112
Referee: Minoru Tojo (Japan)

5–5 on aggregate. South China won on away goals.

2009-09-30
18:00 UTC+3

Arbil (Iraq)	0–1	Al-Kuwait
	Report	Rogerio 74'

Franso Hariri Stadium, Arbil
Referee: Mohsen Torky (Iran)

Al-Kuwait won 2–1 on aggregate.

2009-09-30
19:15 UTC+3

Al-Arabi (Kuwait)	0–0 (a.e.t.)	(Syria) Al-Karamah
	Report
Penalties
Jarragh (penalty scored); Maqseed (penalty scored); Moussawi (penalty scored); Khalaf (penalty missed); Ashkanani (penalty scored); Rashidi (penalty missed)	4–5	(penalty scored) Abbas; (penalty missed) Jenyat; (penalty scored) Ibrahim; (penalty scored) Awde; (penalty scored) Hamawi; (penalty scored) Mando

Sabah Al Salem Stadium, Kuwait City
Attendance: 5,000
Referee: Hassan Al Marzouqi (UAE)

0–0 on aggregate. Al-Karamah won 5–4 on penalties.

== Semi-finals ==
=== First leg ===
2009-10-15
18:00 UTC+7

Bình Dương (Vietnam)	2–1	(Syria) Al-Karamah
Trần Chí Công 19'; Philani 42'	Report	Omaier 68'

Gò Đậu Stadium, Thủ Dầu Một
Attendance: 20,000
Referee: Hiroyoshi Takayama (Japan)

2009-10-15
19:30 UTC+3

Al-Kuwait	2–1	(Hong Kong) South China
Al Marzooqi 48'; Sulaiman 79'	Report	Gerard 90+2'

Al Kuwait Sports Club Stadium, Kuwait City
Attendance: 2,000
Referee: Abdulrahman Abdou (Qatar)

=== Second leg ===
2009-10-21
20:00 UTC+8

South China (Hong Kong)	0–1	Al-Kuwait
	Report	Sulaiman 82'

Hong Kong Stadium, Hong Kong
Attendance: 37,459
Referee: Mohammad Omar Al Saeedi (UAE)

Al-Kuwait won 3–1 on aggregate.

2009-10-21
19:30 UTC+3

Al-Karamah (Syria)	3–0	(Vietnam) Bình Dương
Al Hamawi 18', 36', 59'	Report

Khaled bin Walid Stadium, Homs
Attendance: 23,000
Referee: Tan Hai (China)

Al-Karamah won 4–2 on aggregate.

== Final ==
The 2009 AFC Cup Final was played on November 3 at the home ground of Al Kuwait.

2009-11-03
19:30 UTC+3

Al-Kuwait	2–1	(Syria) Al-Karamah
Hakem 16'; Sulaiman 90+4'	Report	Al Shbli 82'

Al Kuwait Sports Club Stadium, Kuwait City
Attendance: 17,400
Referee: Masoud Moradi (Iran)
