= Rosman Sulaiman =

Singaporean footballer

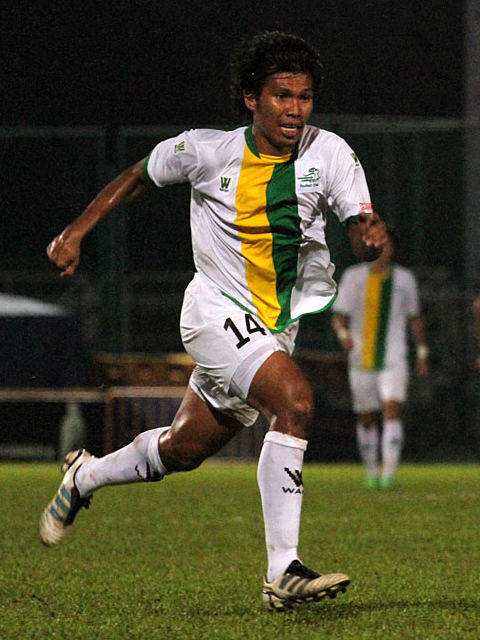
- Rosman Sulaiman appearing for Woodlands Wellington in a S.League match against Warriors F.C. on 21 February 2013

Personal information
- Full name: Mohamad Rosman bin Sulaiman
- Date of birth: 6 November 1982 (age 44)
- Place of birth: Singapore
- Height: 1.72 m (5 ft 7 1/2 in)
- Position: Defender

Team information
- Current team: Woodlands Wellington
- Number: 21

Senior career*
Years	Team	Apps	(Gls)
2001	Marine Castle United	29	(0)
2002	Tanjong Pagar United	30	(2)
2003	Young Lions	16	(0)
2004	Home United	12	(0)
2004	Police SA (loan)	–	(–)
2005	Home United	3	(0)
2005	Young Lions	13	(0)
2006–2012	Home United	169	(1)
2013 –	Woodlands Wellington	16	(1)

International career^{‡}
2009–	Singapore	12	(0)

Managerial career
- 2022-: Warwick Knights (SFL)
- * Club domestic league appearances and goals as of 16 July 2013 ‡ National team caps and goals as of 7 June 2013

Mohamad Rosman bin Sulaiman (born 6 November 1982) is a Singaporean footballer who plays for S.League side, Woodlands Wellington.

He is a defensive player who is able to play in a variety of positions across the backline, as well in as the left, right or centre of midfield.

== Club career ==
Prior to joining his present club, Woodlands Wellington, Rosman has played for S.League clubs Marine Castle, Tanjong Pagar United, Young Lions and most recently Home United. He also had a loan spell at NFL side, Police Sports Association.

As he plays mostly in defense, Rosman has only scored three goals despite chalking up more than 200 appearances in the S.League.

Two of these goals came from the time where he was still playing for Tanjong Pagar United against Clementi Khalsa on 27 March 2002 and Sembawang Rangers on 23 May 2002.

In addition to that, he has one Home United league goal to his name while playing against SAFFC on 21 August 2009.

Rosman has appeared in several matches in the AFC Cup while playing for the Protectors. He captained the team twice during Home United's back to back wins against Maldivian side, Club Valencia in the 2009 AFC Cup Group Stage.

He also has a goal to his name in the 2008 AFC Cup, in which he scored from 30 yards against Dempo SC in the first leg of the 2008 AFC Cup quarter-finals on 16 September 2008.

He made his debut for Woodlands Wellington on 21 February 2013 in a 2–2 draw against Warriors F.C. and scored his first goal for the Rams on 5 March 2013 against his former club, Home United, with a free kick from his own half which evaded the entire defence.

His impressive performances for Woodlands Wellington has led a call up to the Singapore Selection side which will face Atlético Madrid in the Peter Lim Charity Cup, an exhibition match which will be held on 22 May 2013.

== Club career statistics ==
As of 16 July 2013

Rosman Sulaiman's Profile

Club Performance		League		Cup		League Cup		Champions League		Total				
Singapore		S.League		Singapore Cup		League Cup		AFC Cup		Total				
Club	Season	Apps	Goals	Apps	Goals	Apps	Goals	Apps	Goals	Yellow card	(yellow card) (yellow-red card)	Red card	Apps	Goals
Home United	2009	24	1	0	0	0	0	6	0	6	0	0	30	1
Home United	2010	21 (3)	0	1	0	0	0	-	-	6	0	0	22 (3)	0
Home United	2011	21 (3)	0	5	0	3	0	-	-	5	1	0	29 (3)	0
Home United	2012	7 (3)	0	3	0	3	0	2 (1)	0	5	0	0	15 (4)	0
Woodlands Wellington	2013	16	1	1	0	2	0	-	-	5	1	0	19	1

All numbers encased in brackets signify substitute appearances.

=== Appearances in AFC Cup Competitions ===
#	Date	Venue	Club	Opponent	Result	Competition
1.	11 March 2008	Mong Kok Stadium, Mong Kok, Hong Kong	Home United	(Hong Kong) South China	3–2	2008 AFC Cup Group Stage
2.	3 April 2008	Jalan Besar Stadium, Singapore	Home United	(Maldives) Victory SC	2–1	2008 AFC Cup Group Stage
3.	16 April 2008	Maldives National Stadium, Malé, Maldives	Home United	(Maldives) Victory SC	3–1	2009 AFC Cup Group Stage
4.	30 April 2008	Jalan Besar Stadium, Singapore	Home United	(Hong Kong) South China	4–1	2008 AFC Cup Group Stage
5.	14 May 2008	Darul Aman Stadium, Kedah, Malaysia	Home United	(Malaysia) Kedah FA	1–4	2009 AFC Cup Group Stage
6.	16 September 2008	Gachibowli Athletic Stadium, Hyderabad, India	Home United	(India) Dempo SC	1–1	2008 AFC Cup Quarter-finals (1st Leg)
7.	16 September 2008	Jalan Besar Stadium, Singapore	Home United	(India) Dempo SC	3–4	2008 AFC Cup Quarter-finals (2nd Leg)
8.	10 March 2009	Jalan Besar Stadium, Singapore	Home United	(Vietnam) Bình Dương F.C.	2–1	2009 AFC Cup Group Stage
9.	17 March 2009	Suphachalasai Stadium, Bangkok, Thailand	Home United	(Thailand) PEA FC	1–2	2009 AFC Cup Group Stage
10.	7 April 2009	Rasmee Dhandu Stadium, Malé, Maldives	Home United	(Maldives) Club Valencia	1–0	2009 AFC Cup Group Stage
11.	21 April 2009	Jalan Besar Stadium, Singapore	Home United	(Maldives) Club Valencia	5–1	2009 AFC Cup Group Stage
12.	5 May 2009	Gò Đậu Stadium, Thủ Dầu Một, Vietnam	Home United	(Vietnam) Bình Dương F.C.	0–2	2009 AFC Cup Group Stage
13.	23 June 2009	Hong Kong Stadium, Hong Kong	Home United	(Hong Kong) South China	0–4	2009 AFC Cup Knockout Stage
14.	24 April 2012	Mong Kok Stadium, Mong Kok, Hong Kong	Home United	(Hong Kong) Citizen AA	2–1	2012 AFC Cup Group Stage
15.	8 May 2012	Bishan Stadium, Singapore	Home United	(Thailand) Chonburi FC	1–2	2012 AFC Cup Group Stage
16.	23 May 2012	Amman International Stadium, Amman, Jordan	Home United	(Iraq) Al Shorta	0–3	2012 AFC Cup Group Stage
Records start from 2008 to the present. Updated as of 12 January 2013

=== Goals in AFC Champions League / AFC Cup competitions ===
#	Date	Venue	Club	Opponent	Score	Result	Competition
1.	16 Sep 2008	Gachibowli Athletic Stadium, Hyderabad, India	Home United	(India) Dempo SC	1–1	1-1	2008 AFC Cup Quarter-finals (1st Leg)
Updated 4 November 2012

== International career ==
Rosman has made over ten appearances for the Singapore national team so far, primarily in the 2011 AFC Asian Cup Qualifiers.

=== International appearances ===
#	Date	Venue	Opponent	Result	Competition
1.	28 January 2009	Bishan Stadium, Singapore	Jordan	2–1	2011 AFC Asian Cup Qualifiers
2.	18 November 2009	Rajamangala Stadium, Bangkok, Thailand	Thailand	1–0	2011 AFC Asian Cup Qualifiers
3.	4 March 2010	King Abdullah Stadium, Amman, Jordan	Jordan	1–2	2011 AFC Asian Cup Qualifiers
4.	8 December 2010	Mỹ Đình National Stadium, Hanoi, Vietnam	Vietnam	0–1	2010 AFF Suzuki Cup
5.	7 June 2013	New Laos National Stadium, Vientiane, Laos	Laos	5–2	International Friendly
Records start from 2009 to the present. Updated as of 7 June 2013
