= 2009 AFC Cup =

6th secondary club football tournament organized by the

Tournament details
- Dates: 10 March – 3 November 2009
- Teams: 29+3 (from 17 associations)

Final positions
- Champions: Al Kuwait (1st title)
- Runners-up: (Syria) Al Karamah

Tournament statistics
- Matches played: 117
- Goals scored: 334 (2.85 per match)
- Attendance: 569,263 (4,865 per match)
- Top scorer(s): (Nigeria) Robert Akaruye (Syria) Mohamad Hamwi (Syria) Jehad Al Hussain (Vietnam) Huỳnh Kesley Alves (8 goals)

The 2009 AFC Cup was the sixth season of the AFC Cup, a competition among clubs from member nations of the Asian Football Confederation.

With the Asian Football Confederation reviewed the format of the AFC Champions League and made significant changes to way the competition is run, the teams that qualified for the AFC Cup is also from different countries compared to the previous editions.

== Allocation of entries per association ==
A total of 32 clubs will participate in the 2009 AFC Cup. Below is the qualification scheme for the 2009 AFC Cup.

- 2 teams to qualify from each of the following associations:
  - Hong Kong
  - Iraq
  - Jordan
  - Kuwait
  - Lebanon
  - Malaysia
  - Maldives
  - Oman
  - Syria
  - Yemen
- 1 team to qualify from each of the following associations:
  - Bahrain
  - India
  - Singapore
  - Thailand
  - Uzbekistan
  - Vietnam
- 3 teams which did not satisfy the criteria to participate in the 2009 AFC Champions League qualifying play-offs (so each association had one additional team to qualify):
  - Bahrain
  - Lebanon
  - Vietnam
- 3 losers from AFC Champions League 2009 qualifying play-offs

== Participating Countries in Region ==
Following are the 2009 AFC Cup Participants.

West Asia
Team	Qualifying method
(Bahrain) Al-Muharraq^{1}	2008 AFC Cup winners 2007–08 Bahraini Premier League winners 2008 Bahraini King's Cup winners
(Bahrain) Busaiteen	2007–08 Bahraini Premier League runners-up
(India) Mohun Bagan AC	2008 Indian Federation Cup winners
(Iraq) Arbil	2007–08 Iraqi Premier League champions
(Iraq) Al-Zawraa	2007–08 Iraqi Premier League runners-up
(Jordan) Al-Wihdat	2007–08 Jordan League champions
(Jordan) Al-Faisaly	2007-08 Jordan FA Cup winners
Al-Kuwait	2007–08 Kuwaiti Premier League champions
(Kuwait) Al-Arabi	2008 Kuwait Emir Cup winners
(Lebanon) Safa^{1}	2008 AFC Cup runners-up
(Lebanon) Al-Ahed	2007–08 Lebanese Premier League champions
(Lebanon) Al-Mabarrah	2007–08 Lebanese FA Cup winners
(Oman) Al-Orouba	2007–08 Omani League champions
(Oman) Al-Suwaiq	2008 Sultan Qaboos Cup winners
(Syria) Al-Karamah	2007–08 Syrian Premier League champions 2007-08 Syrian Cup winners
(Syria) Al-Majd	2007–08 Syrian Premier League runners-up
(Uzbekistan) Neftchi Farg'ona	2008 Uzbek League 3rd place
(Yemen) Al-Hilal Al-Sahili	2007–08 Yemeni League champions
(Yemen) Al-Tilal	2007 Yemeni President Cup winners
(India) Dempo	2009 AFC Champions League qualifying play-off losers

East Asia
Team	Qualifying method
(Hong Kong) South China	2007–08 Hong Kong First Division League champions
(Hong Kong) Eastern	2007 Hong Kong Senior Challenge Shield winners
(Malaysia) Kedah FA	2007–08 Super League Malaysia champions 2008 Malaysia FA Cup winners
(Malaysia) Johor FC	2007–08 Super League Malaysia 3rd place
(Maldives) Club Valencia	2008 Dhivehi League champions
(Maldives) VB Sports Club	2008 Maldives FA Cup winners
(Singapore) Home United	2008 S.League 3rd place
(Thailand) Chonburi	2008 Thailand Premier League runners-up
(Vietnam) Binh Duong^{1}	2008 V-League champions
(Vietnam) Hanoi ACB	2007–08 Vietnamese Cup winners
(Indonesia) PSMS Medan	2009 AFC Champions League qualifying play-off losers
(Thailand) PEA	2009 AFC Champions League qualifying play-off losers

^{1} These clubs had qualified for the 2009 AFC Champions League, but were removed as their nations did not meet AFC Criteria.

== Round and draw dates ==
Date	Match
12 January	Draw for group stage
10 March	Group stage Matchday 1
17 March	Group stage Matchday 2
7 April	Group stage Matchday 3
21 April	Group stage Matchday 4
5 May	Group stage Matchday 5
19 May	Group stage Matchday 6
26 May	Round of 16, West Asia

Date	Event
23 June	Round of 16, East Asia
29 June	Draw for remaining rounds
15 September	Quarter-finals 1st leg
30 September	Quarter-finals 2nd leg
15 October	Semi-finals 1st leg
21 October	Semi-finals 2nd leg
3 November	Final

== Group stage ==
The draw for the group stage was held on 12 January 2009 in Kuala Lumpur, Malaysia.

Each club plays double round-robin (home and away) against fellow three group members, a total of 6 matches each. Clubs receive 3 points for a win, 1 point for a tie, 0 points for a loss. The clubs are ranked according to points and tie breakers are in following order:

1. Greater number of points obtained in the group matches between the teams concerned;
2. Goal difference resulting from the group matches between the teams concerned; (Away goals do not apply)
3. Greater number of goals scored in the group matches between the teams concerned; (Away goals do not apply)
4. Goal difference in all the group matches;
5. Greater number of goals scored in all the group matches;
6. Kicks from the penalty mark if only two teams are involved and they are both on the field of play;
7. Fewer score calculated according to the number of yellow and red cards received in the group matches; (1 point for each yellow card, 3 points for each red card as a consequence of two yellow cards, 3 points for each direct red card, 4 points for each yellow card followed by a direct red card)
8. Drawing of lots.

Winners and runners-up of each group will qualify for the next round.

=== Group A ===
Team	Pld	W	D	L	GF	GA	GD	Pts	BUS	NEF	AHD	TIL
(Bahrain) Busaiteen	6	3	3	0	14	7	+7	12		2–2	4–2	3–0
(Uzbekistan) Neftchi Farg'ona	6	3	2	1	12	9	+3	11	1–1		2–1	1–0
(Lebanon) Al-Ahed	6	2	1	3	13	10	+3	7	1–1	5–1		3–0
(Yemen) Al-Tilal	6	1	0	5	3	16	−13	3	1–3	0–5	2–1	

=== Group B ===
Team	Pld	W	D	L	GF	GA	GD	Pts	ZAW	SAF	HIL	SUW
(Iraq) Al-Zawraa	6	4	1	1	8	3	+5	13		2–1	2–0	2–0
(Lebanon) Safa	6	4	0	2	5	3	+2	12	1–0		0–1	1–0
(Yemen) Al-Hilal Al-Sahili	6	2	1	3	5	7	−2	7	1–1	0–1		2–0
(Oman) Al-Suwaiq	6	1	0	5	3	8	−5	3	0–1	0–1	3–1	

=== Group C ===
Team	Pld	W	D	L	GF	GA	GD	Pts	ARB	ARL	ORU	MAB
(Kuwait) Al-Arabi	6	3	2	1	11	6	+5	11		2–0	2–0	4–2
(Iraq) Arbil	6	2	2	2	8	7	+1	8	1–1		3–0	3–2
(Oman) Al-Orouba	6	2	2	2	6	7	−1	8	1–1	1–1		3–0
(Lebanon) Al-Mabarrah	6	2	0	4	7	12	−5	6	2–1	1–0	0–1	

=== Group D ===
Team	Pld	W	D	L	GF	GA	GD	Pts	KUW	KAR	WAH	MOH
Al-Kuwait	6	4	1	1	12	4	+8	13		2–1	1–0	6–0
(Syria) Al-Karamah	6	4	0	2	12	7	+5	12	2–1		3–1	1–0
(Jordan) Al-Wahdat	6	3	1	2	12	7	+5	10	1–1	3–1		5–0
(India) Mohun Bagan	6	0	0	6	1	19	−18	0	0–1	0–4	1–2	

=== Group E ===
Team	Pld	W	D	L	GF	GA	GD	Pts	MAJ	DEM	MHQ	FAI
(Syria) Al-Majd	6	4	1	1	12	9	+3	13		2–1	1–1	4–3
(India) Dempo	6	3	1	2	10	8	+2	10	1–0		0–1	3–1
(Bahrain) Al-Muharraq	6	1	3	2	7	8	−1	6	2–3	1–1		0–0
(Jordan) Al-Faisaly	6	1	1	4	11	15	−4	4	1–2	3–4	3–2	

=== Group F ===
Team	Pld	W	D	L	GF	GA	GD	Pts	SC	MED	VB	JFC
(Hong Kong) South China	6	5	1	0	15	5	+10	16		3–0	2–1	2–0
(Indonesia) PSMS Medan	6	4	1	1	9	7	+2	13	2–2		1–0	3–1
(Maldives) VB	6	1	1	4	5	7	−2	4	1–2	1–2		2–0
(Malaysia) Johor FC	6	0	1	5	2	12	−10	1	1–4	0–1	0–0	

=== Group G ===
Pos	Team	Pld	W	D	L	GF	GA	GD	Pts	Qualification	CHO	KED	EAS	HAN
1	(Thailand) Chonburi	6	5	0	1	17	4	+13	15	Advance to knockout stage		3–1	4–1	6–0
2	(Malaysia) Kedah	6	2	1	3	14	10	+4	7	Advance to knockout stage	0–1		2–0	7–0
3	(Hong Kong) Eastern	6	2	1	3	9	13	−4	7		2–1	3–3		3–0
4	(Vietnam) Hanoi ACB	6	2	0	4	6	19	−13	6		0–2	3–1	3–0	

=== Group H ===
Team	Pld	W	D	L	GF	GA	GD	Pts	BD	HU	PEA	VAL
(Vietnam) Binh Duong	6	4	1	1	15	4	+11	13		2–0	1–1	3–0
(Singapore) Home United	6	4	0	2	12	7	+5	12	2–1		3–1	5–1
(Thailand) PEA	6	3	1	2	12	10	+2	10	1–3	2–1		4–1
(Maldives) Club Valencia	6	0	0	6	3	21	−18	0	0–5	0–1	1–3	

== Knockout stage ==
=== Round of 16 ===
The draw for the round of 16 of the 2009 AFC Cup was held on 12 January 2009, along with the draw for the group stage. The Western Asia matches were played on 26 May, while the Eastern Asia matches were played on 23 June.

Team 1	Score	Team 2
West Asia
Busaiteen (Bahrain)	1–2 (aet)	(Syria) Al-Karamah
Al-Zawraa (Iraq)	1–3	(Iraq) Arbil
Al-Arabi (Kuwait)	2–1 (aet)	(Lebanon) Safa
Al-Kuwait	3–1	(India) Dempo
Al-Majd (Syria)	0–0 (aet) (1–3 p)	(Uzbekistan) Neftchi Farg'ona
East Asia
South China (Hong Kong)	4–0	(Singapore) Home United
Chonburi (Thailand)	4–0	(Indonesia) PSMS Medan
Binh Duong (Vietnam)	8–2	(Malaysia) Kedah

=== Quarter-finals ===
The draw for the quarter-finals and the remaining knockout rounds took place at Kuala Lumpur, Malaysia on 29 June 2009 starting 7:30 pm. The first leg matches were played on 15 September, with the second leg matches played on 30 September.

Team 1	Agg.	Team 2	1st leg	2nd leg
Al-Kuwait	2–1	(Iraq) Arbil	1–1	1–0
Neftchi Farg'ona (Uzbekistan)	5–5 (a)	(Hong Kong) South China	5–4	0–1
Chonburi (Thailand)	2–4	(Vietnam) Binh Duong	2–2	0–2
Al-Karamah (Syria)	0–0 (5–4 p)	(Kuwait) Al-Arabi	0–0	0–0 (aet)

=== Semi-finals ===
The first leg matches were played on 15 October, with the second leg matches played on 21 October.

Team 1	Agg.	Team 2	1st leg	2nd leg
Al-Kuwait	3–1	(Hong Kong) South China	2–1	1–0
Binh Duong (Vietnam)	2–4	(Syria) Al-Karamah	2–1	0–3

=== Final ===
The 2009 AFC Cup Final was played on 3 November at the home ground of Al Kuwait.

3 November 2009
19:30 UTC+3

Al-Kuwait	2–1	(Syria) Al-Karamah
Hakem 16'; Sulaiman 90+4'	Report	Al Shbli 82'

Al Kuwait Sports Club Stadium, Kuwait City
Attendance: 17,400
Referee: Masoud Moradi (Iran)

AFC Cup
2009 Winners

Al Kuwait
First Title

== Statistics ==
=== Top goalscorers ===
Rank	Player	Club	MD1	MD2	MD3	MD4	MD5	MD6	R16	QF1	QF2	SF1	SF2	F	Total
1	(Nigeria) Robert Akaruye	(Bahrain) Busaiteen	2	2	1		2		1						8
1	(Syria) Mohamad Hamwi	(Syria) Al-Karamah	1		2			1	1				3		8
1	(Syria) Jehad Al Hussain	Al-Kuwait				3	1	1	3						8
1	(Vietnam) Huỳnh Kesley Alves	(Vietnam) Binh Duong	1	1	1		1		4						8
5	(Brazil) Cacá	(Hong Kong) South China	1		1	2	2		1						7
6	(Ivory Coast) Mohamed Koné	(Thailand) Chonburi	1	1		1			3						6
6	(Uzbekistan) Alisher Halikov	(Uzbekistan) Neftchi Farg'ona	1		1	1		3							6
8	(Jordan) Mo'ayyad Abu Keshek	(Jordan) Al-Faisaly		2		1	1	1							5
8	(Malaysia) Mohd Azrul Ahmad	(Malaysia) Kedah			1		3		1						5
8	(Nigeria) Ranty Martins Soleye	(India) Dempo	1	2				2							5
8	(Syria) Firas Al Khatib	(Kuwait) Al-Arabi	1	1				2	1						5
8	(Thailand) Pipob On-Mo	(Thailand) Chonburi	1			1		2		1					5
8	(Vietnam) Nguyễn Vũ Phong	(Vietnam) Binh Duong					1	2	1	1					5
