= Eduardo Molina =

Eduardo Molina may refer to:

- Eduardo Molina Arévalo, an engineer who helped to reduce the issue of water scarcity in Mexico, or things named after him
  - Eduardo Molina metro station, a Mexico City Metro station
  - Eduardo Molina (Mexico City Metrobús), a BRT station in Line 4
  - Deportivo Eduardo Molina (Mexico City Metrobús), a BRT station in Line 4
  - Av. Ing. Eduardo Molina, an eje vial avenue in Mexico City
- Gaston Eduardo Molina, an Argentine footballer
