= Hassan Mudhafar Al-Gheilani =

Omani footballer (born 1980)

Hassan Mudhafar
Personal information
- Full name: Hassan Yousuf Mudhafar Al-Gheilani
- Date of birth: 26 June 1980 (age 46)
- Place of birth: Sur, Oman
- Height: 1.66 m (5 ft 5 in)
- Position: Left back

Senior career*
Years	Team	Apps	(Gls)
2000–2005	Al-Oruba	62	(0)
2005–2007	Al-Ahli	40	(1)
2007–2008	Al-Salmiya	20	(0)
2008–2009	Al-Rayyan	21	(0)
2009–2010	Al-Wahda	17	(0)
2010–2012	Al-Ettifaq	24	(0)
2012–2013	Dhofar	20	(0)
2013–2014	Saham	14	(0)
2014–2017	Al-Oruba	12	(0)
2017–2018	Al-Mudhaibi	0	(0)

International career
2003–2015	Oman	127	(6)
- * Club domestic league appearances and goals

Hassan Yousuf Mudhafar Al-Gheilani (Arabic: حَسَن يُوسُف مُظَفَّر الْغَيْلَانِيّ; born 26 June 1980), commonly known as Hassan Mudhafar, is an Omani former footballer who plays for Al-Oruba SC in Oman Professional League.

== Club career ==
On 15 June 2013, he signed a one-year contract with Saham SC. On 13 July 2014, he signed a one-year contract with his first most club Al-Oruba SC.

== International career ==
=== Arabian Gulf Cup ===
Hassan has made appearances in the 16th Arabian Gulf Cup, the 17th Arabian Gulf Cup, the 18th Arabian Gulf Cup, the 19th Arabian Gulf Cup, the 20th Arabian Gulf Cup and the 21st Arabian Gulf Cup.

His only goal in the Arabian Gulf Cup came in the 17th Arabian Gulf Cup in a 2–1 win over the United Arab Emirates hence helping his country to reach the semi-finals and then the finals of the Arabian Gulf Cup for the first time. But Oman lost in the final to the hosts, Qatar in a penalty shootout after the goalkeeping sensation Ali Al-Habsi missed a penalty. Qatar won the match 6–5 on penalties after the match had ended 1–1 at normal time. Amad Al-Hosni was awarded the "Top Goal Scorer" award of the competition with a total of four goals.

=== AFC Asian Cup ===
Hassan has made appearances in the 2004 AFC Asian Cup qualification, the 2004 AFC Asian Cup, the 2007 AFC Asian Cup qualification, the 2007 AFC Asian Cup, the 2011 AFC Asian Cup qualification and the 2015 AFC Asian Cup qualification.

He scored a well-remembered goal in 2007 AFC Asian Cup qualification in a 2–1 win over the United Arab Emirates hence helping his team to qualify for the 2007 AFC Asian Cup. Badar Al-Maimani scored one and the only goal of Oman in the 2007 AFC Asian Cup in a 1–1 draw against Australia. In the tournament, Oman won two points in a 1–1 draw against Australia and in a 0–0 draw against Iraq and hence failed to qualify for the quarter-finals.

=== FIFA World Cup Qualification ===
Hassan has made six appearances in the 2006 FIFA World Cup qualification, seven in the 2010 FIFA World Cup qualification and nine in the 2014 FIFA World Cup qualification.

His only goal for Oman in FIFA World Cup qualification came in the first round of FIFA World Cup qualification in a 2–0 win over Nepal.

=== Retirement ===
On 22 May 2015, after captaining the winning side, Al-Oruba SC in the 2014-15 Sultan Qaboos Cup, Hassan announced his retirement from international football with a record of 111 appearances.

== Career statistics ==
=== Club ===
Club	Season	Division	League		Cup		Continental (Note: Includes appearances in the AFC Champions League and AFC Cup)		Other		Total	
Club	Season	Division	Apps	Goals	Apps	Goals	Apps	Goals	Apps	Goals	Apps	Goals
Al-Ahli	2006–07	Qatar Stars League	-	1	-	0	0	0	-	0	-	1
Al-Ahli	Total		-	1	-	0	0	0	-	0	-	1
Al-Salmiya	2007–08	Kuwaiti Premier League	-	0	-	2	0	0	-	0	-	2
Al-Salmiya	Total		-	0	-	2	0	0	-	0	-	2
Al-Wahda	2009–10	UAE Pro League	-	0	-	0	6	0	-	0	-	0
Al-Wahda	Total		-	0	-	0	6	0	-	0	-	0
Al-Ettifaq	2010–11	Saudi Professional League	20	0	5	0	0	0	0	0	25	0
Al-Ettifaq	2011–12	Saudi Professional League	4	0	1	0	4	0	0	0	9	0
Al-Ettifaq	Total		24	0	6	0	4	0	0	0	34	0
Dhofar	2012–13	Oman Elite League	-	0	-	0	4	0	0	0	-	0
Dhofar	Total		-	0	-	0	4	0	0	0	-	0
Career total			-	1	-	2	14	0	-	0	-	3

=== International ===
Scores and results list Oman's goal tally first.

#	Date	Venue	Opponent	Score	Result	Competition
1.	25 September 2003	World Cup Stadium, Incheon, Korea Republic	Nepal	3–0	7–0	2004 AFC Asian Cup qualification
2.	13 December 2004	Jassim Bin Hamad Stadium, Doha, Qatar	United Arab Emirates	1–1	2–1	17th Arabian Gulf Cup
3.	11 October 2006	Sultan Qaboos Sports Complex, Muscat, Oman	United Arab Emirates	1–0	2–1	2007 AFC Asian Cup qualification
4.	8 October 2007	Sultan Qaboos Sports Complex, Muscat, Oman	Nepal	2–0	2–0	2010 FIFA World Cup Qualification
5.	27 January 2008	Sultan Qaboos Sports Complex, Muscat, Oman	Singapore	2–0	2–0	Friendly
6.	15 January 2012	Sultan Qaboos Sports Complex, Muscat, Oman	DR Congo	2–1	2–2	Friendly

== Honours ==
- With Al Wahda

- UAE Pro-League (1): 2009-10

- With Al-Ettifaq

- Saudi Crown Prince Cup Runner-up: 2011-12

- With Dhofar

- Omani Super Cup Runner-up: 2012

== See also ==
- List of men's footballers with 100 or more international caps
