= Ewerson Batata =

Brazilian footballer (born 1981)

Personal information
- Full name: Ewerson Eduardo Moreira
- Date of birth: 7 July 1981 (age 45)
- Place of birth: Brazil
- Position: Striker

Senior career*
Years	Team	Apps	(Gls)
2000	J. Malucelli Futebol		
2002–2004	América Managua		
2005	Esporte Clube São Bento		
2006	Clube Atlético Tubarão		
2006	Nacional Futebol Clube		
2006–2008	Al-Orouba SC		
2008	Haiphong FC		
2008–2010	Khaitan SC		
2010–2011	Fanja SC		
2013	América Futebol Clube (SP)		
- * Club domestic league appearances and goals

Ewerson Eduardo Moreira (born 7 July 1981) is a Brazilian former footballer.

== Early life ==
Batata started playing football at a young age. He is a native of Curitiba, Brazil.

== Career ==
Batata started his career with Brazilian side J. Malucelli Futebol. In 2002, he signed for Nicaraguan side América Managua. In 2005, he signed for Brazilian side Esporte Clube São Bento. In 2006, he signed for Brazilian side Clube Atlético Tubarão. After that, he signed for Brazilian side Nacional Futebol Clube. After that, he signed for Omani side Al-Orouba SC. He helped the club win the league. In 2008, he signed for Vietnamese side Haiphong FC. After that, he signed for Kuwaiti side Khaitan SC. In 2010, he signed for Omani side Fanja SC. In 2013, he signed for Brazilian side América Futebol Clube (SP).

== Style of play ==
Batata mainly operated as a striker. He was known for his set-piece taking ability.

== Personal life ==
Batata is a Christian. He has a daughter.
