= Kwame Obeng Darko =

Ghanaian former footballer

Obeng Darko
Personal information
- Full name: Kwame Obeng Darko
- Date of birth: 26 March 1986 (age 40)
- Place of birth: Accra, Ghana
- Height: 1.80 m (5 ft 11 in)
- Position: Striker

Team information
- Current team: Liberty Professionals
- Number: 23

Youth career
- 2001–2003: 11 Stoppers
- 2003–2005: Fotofas Colts Club

Senior career*
Years	Team	Apps	(Gls)
2005–2007	Liberty Professionals		
2008–2009	Asante Kotoko		
2009	Al-Karamah		
2010	Power FC		
2010	Liberty Professionals		
- * Club domestic league appearances and goals

Kwame Obeng Darko (born March 26, 1986) is a Ghanaian former footballer.

== Early career ==
The Ghanaian born Darko began his career with 11 stoppers (u-12) then joined Fotofas Colts club (u-17).

== Career ==
Darko played two years with Liberty Professionals F.C. before signing for Asante Kotoko. He played now for two months for Asante Kotoko and signed on 15 February 2009 for Syrian club Al-Karamah. He was in summer 2009 released by the Syrian club Al-Karamah and turned back to Ghana who signed for Power FC. The striker left his club Power FC in September 2010 and signed with Liberty Professionals F.C.

== Personal life ==
Darko is the son of Hayford Darko and Margaret Bediako and is the second of four children.
