= Care Society =

Non-profit organization in the Maldives

- Care Society
- Founded: 9 November 1998
- Type: Non Profit Organization
- Location: Male', Maldives
- Region served: Maldives
- Services: CDC, CBR
- Members: 421
- Website: www.caresociety.org.mv

Care Society was founded on 9 November 1998 in the Maldives, the largest non-profit organization in the Maldives. Since its inception, it has served in various fields of humanitarian work. Care also played a key role in post-tsunami relief operations in the Maldives.

== Community Based Rehabilitation ==
Since 2004, Care introduced community-based rehabilitation programs in the Maldives. The program's main objective is to enhance the livelihood of disabled people by empowering the local communities.

In collaboration with Handicap International (HI), Two local centers for CBR were established in the southern region; Addu Atoll Hithadhoo and G. Dh Atoll Thinadhoo. In 2007, Care Society Partnered with the South Asian CBR Network, to promote the United Nations convention on the rights of persons with disabilities. (UNCRPD)

In 2010, in collaboration with FIDA international, CBR training was held in 4 central atolls in Maldives and CBR components were established in Vaavu Keyodhoo, Felidhoo, Haa Dhal Hanimadhoo and HaaAlif Marandhoo.

== Care Development Center ==
In 2010, Care Development Center (CDC) was established to cater for the disabled including, Autism, Hearing impairment, speech impairment, cerebral palsy, Down syndrome, learning disability, and intellectual disability. Around 38 individuals are under the centre's care guided by 8 trained teachers and two management staff trained in psychology, Management, International Child Welfare and Disability Studies.

CDC is the only entity in Maldives that serves for the disabilities mentioned above. The Training center also provides Vocational training, Physiotherapy, Parent counseling.

== Tsunami Rehabilitation and Reconstruction Program ==
After the 2004 tsunami, Care in collaboration with Oxfam GB and Action Aid International (AI) conducted rapid assessments in the southern islands and dispatched over $200,000 in aid to communities in G. Alif Atoll and G. Dh Atoll.

In collaboration with AAI, A 3-year tsunami response program was initiated with a focus on, Providing Psycho-social care to traumatized survivors, Providing alternate livelihoods for tsunami-affected survivors, Combating social issues such as drugs, domestic violence, Violence Against Women and child abuse, Developing agricultural nurseries and training Centers, Mobilizing women and community groups to voice their rights. The program reached over 17 islands in four atolls.

== Pre School Development ==
The program was implemented with technical support from Education Development Center (EDC) and teachers from CDC (Care Development Center). A total of 9 Preschools was developed in 7 atolls.
