= Helio da Silva (footballer) =

Brazilian footballer (born 1981)

Personal information
- Full name: Helio da Silva Assis
- Date of birth: 26 January 1981 (age 45)
- Place of birth: Brazil
- Height: 1.87 m (6 ft 2 in)
- Position: Defender

Senior career*
Years	Team	Apps	(Gls)
- Sociedade Esportiva Matsubara
2005	SHB Da Nang		
2006–2007	Saigon Port		
2008	Haiphong		
2009	Becamex Binh Duong		(4)
2010–2011	Song Lam Nghe An	22	(9)
2012–2013	Becamex Binh Duong	46	(1)
2014	Hoang Anh Gia Lai	19	(3)
- * Club domestic league appearances and goals

Helio da Silva Assis (born 26 January 1981) is a Brazilian former footballer who played for Vietnamese side Song Lam Nghe An FC, helping the club win the league. He mainly operated as a central midfielder who "recover[ed] the ball relatively well", though his "ability to launch attacks" was "weak".

He is a naturalized Vietnamese citizen, taking the name Nguyễn Hoàng Helio.
