= Emmanuel Ezukam =

Nigerian football midfielder

Personal information
- Full name: Emmanuel Elochukwu Ezukam
- Date of birth: 22 October 1984 (age 42)
- Place of birth: Nigeria
- Height: 1.80 m (5 ft 11 in)
- Positions: Defensive midfielder; central midfielder

Senior career*
Years	Team	Apps	(Gls)
2002–2003	FC Ararat Yerevan		
2003–2004	Zob Ahan		(1)
2004	FC Ararat Yerevan	8	(1)
2004–2007	Al-Taliya	54	(6)
2008–2009	Al Arabi	58	(11)
2009–2010	Al Salmiya		(2)
2010–2011	Khaitan		
2011	Kazma		
2012	Al-Ittihad SC Aleppo		
2012–2016	Al-Shabab		
- * Club domestic league appearances and goals as of 3 May 2016

Emmanuel Elukwu Ezukam (born 22 October 1984 in Nigeria), is a Nigerian football midfielder who plays for Ghazl El-Mehalla.

Ezukam played for the Al Arabi Kuwait side that reached the quarter-finals of the 2009 AFC Cup.
