= Younis Mubarak Al-Mahaijri =

Omani footballer (born 1987)

Younis Mubarak
Personal information
- Full name: Younis Mubarak Obaid Al-Mahaijri
- Date of birth: 12 March 1987 (age 39)
- Place of birth: Sur, Oman
- Height: 1.72 m (5 ft 8 in)
- Position: Attacking midfielder

Team information
- Current team: Al-Oruba
- Number: 10

Youth career
- Al-Orouba

Senior career*
Years	Team	Apps	(Gls)
2004–2011	Al-Orouba	?	(?)
2011–2012	Sur	?	(?)
2012–2013	Al-Nahda	?	
2013–2014	Sur	?	
2014–	Al-Orouba		

International career
2006–2008	Oman	4	(0)
- * Club domestic league appearances and goals

Younis Mubarak Obaid Al Mahaijri (Arabic: يونس مبارك عبيد المحيجري; born 12 March 1987), commonly known as Younis Mubarak, is an Omani footballer who plays for Al-Orouba SC.

== Club career ==
On 7 July 2014, he signed a one-year contract extension with Al-Orouba SC.

=== Club career statistics ===
Club	Season	Division	League		Cup		Continental (Note: Includes appearances in the AFC Cup)		Other (Note: Includes appearances in the Arab Champions League, GCC Champions League and Club Friendlies)		Total	
Club	Season	Division	Apps	Goals	Apps	Goals	Apps	Goals	Apps	Goals	Apps	Goals
Al-Orouba	2004–05	Omani League	-	3	-	0	0	0	-	1	-	4
Al-Orouba	2005–06	Omani League	-	3	-	0	0	0	-	0	-	3
Al-Orouba	2006–07	Omani League	-	3	-	0	0	0	-	0	-	3
Al-Orouba	2007–08	Omani League	-	1	-	2	0	0	-	2	-	5
Al-Orouba	2008–09	Omani League	-	3	-	0	0	0	-	2	-	5
Al-Orouba	2009–10	Omani League	-	2	-	0	0	0	-	0	-	2
Al-Orouba	2010–11	Omani League	-	4	-	0	4	1	-	0	-	5
Al-Orouba	Total		-	19	-	2	4	1	-	5	-	27
Sur	2011–12	Oman Elite League	-	3	-	0	0	0	-	0	-	3
Sur	2012–13	Oman Elite League	-	1	-	0	0	0	-	0	-	1
Sur	Total		-	4	-	0	0	0	-	0	-	4
Al-Orouba	2013–14	Oman Professional League	-	2	-	0	0	0	-	0	-	2
Al-Orouba	Total		-	2	-	0	0	0	-	0	-	2
Career total			-	25	-	2	4	1	-	5	-	33

== International career ==
Younis was part of the first team squad of the Oman national football team till 2008. He was selected for the national team for the first time in 2006. He has made appearances in the 2007 AFC Asian Cup and the 2010 FIFA World Cup qualification.
