= Mohamed Hussain =

Maldivian footballer

Personal information
- Full name: Mohamed Hussain
- Date of birth: 12 October 1979 (age 47)
- Place of birth: Maldives
- Height: 1.74 m (5 ft 8 1/2 in)
- Position: Midfielder

Senior career*
Years	Team	Apps	(Gls)
1998	Eagles		
1999–2005	New Radiant		
2006	Valencia		
2007–2012	VB Sports Club		
2012	New Radiant		
2013	BG Sports Club		

International career
2000–2009	Maldives		

Managerial career
- 2011: VB Sports Club (player-coach)
- * Club domestic league appearances and goals

Mohamed Hussain (born 12 October 1979), nicknamed Oittey, is a retired Maldivian professional footballer. He has been a member of the FAM Normalization Committee since 1 April 2015.

== Club career ==
Hussain began his career at Club Eagles in 1998. Then he moved to New Radiant for the following season and played there for six years.

Hussain won the best player award of the 2003 Cup Winners' Cup, playing for New Radiant and suffered a major ligament injury during the 2003 Dhivehi League game against Island FC. The injury brought him down with continuous series of injury, which led him to stay away from football for long periods. He also underwent surgeries to recover from the knee ligament injury.

He later moved to VB Sports Club in 2007, after spending a year at Club Valencia.

During the 2011 Dhivehi League, Hussain was appointed as a player-coach for the VB Sports Club, due to coach Can Vanli and assistant coach Mohamed Shahid's abroad trips for different reasons. The only match played under his instruction was against Maziya on 11 June 2011, where he led the team for a 2–1 victory in the last minute of the game.

In the June transfer period of 2012 season, Hussain again moved to his former club New Radiant, but in 2013 he spent his last season at BG Sports Club.

== International career ==
Hussain made his debut for the Maldives national team in 2000 and played in the Golden Jubilee Football Tournament, which was played to celebrate the 50th anniversary of football in the Maldives.

== Retirement ==
The Football Association of Maldives announced that Hussain would retire in the 2014 Maldivian FA Charity Shield, with New Radiant's 16 number shirt. He kicked off the match and came off the field with honor, marking his retirement. The shirt he used in this match was auctioned and raised MVR 60,000. The auction was won by Aishath Inayath, and 50% of the money was gifted to Advocating the Rights of Children and the other 50% to Care Society of Maldives.

He also announced that he would proceed to coaching after his retirement.

== Administrative roles ==
Hussain was appointed as a member of the FAM Normalization Committee by the FIFA Emergency Committee effective 1 April 2015, following the departure of the previous member Mohamed Nizam, who took over the position of head coach of TC Sports Club.
