= Al-Orouba SC =

Omani sports club

Al-Orouba SC نادي العروبة الرياضي
- Full name: Al-Orouba Sporting Club
- Nicknames: Al-Marid (The Giant(s))
- Founded: 1970; 56 years ago
- Ground: Sur Sports Complex; Sur, Oman
- Capacity: 8,000
- Chairman: (Oman) Abdullah Salim Al-Mukhaini
- Manager: (Oman) Ahmed Al-Alawi
- League: Oman Professional League
- 2022–23: 12th
Home colours	Away colours

Al-Orouba Sporting Club (Arabic: نادي العروبة الرياضي; also known locally as Al-Marid, or "The Giant(s)", or just plainly as Al-Orouba) is a sports club based in Sur, Oman. The club's football section currently plays in the Oman Professional League, top division of Oman Football Association. Their home ground is Sur Sports Complex. The stadium is government owned, but the club also owns their own stadium and sports equipment, as well as their training facilities. The club also participated in AFC Cup, in continental stages.

== History ==
The club was formed in 1956 in Kuwait and the name given was Al-Ahli. The first chairman of the club was late Sheikh Saleh Nasser Al-Hashar. In November 1970, the club officials met for the first time in Oman and one year after this meeting the club was renamed to Al-Orouba. The club was founded in 1970 and was registered on 26 June 2002.

== Being a multisport club ==
Al-Orouba SC like many other clubs in Oman, have not only football in their list, but also hockey, volleyball, handball, basketball, badminton and squash.

== Crest and colours ==
Al-Orouba SC have been known to wear a full white (with green stripes on the trim) or green (Away) kit, varying themselves from neighbors Al-Tali'aa SC (orange) and Sur SC (blue) kits. They have also had many different sponsorships over the years. As of now, Uhlsport provides them with kits.

The Al-Orouba SC logo consists of a dow steering representing the history of Sur in dow making & historical sea trading. It consists of three rings indicating a link between sports, culture and society.

== Honours and achievements ==
=== National titles ===
- Oman Professional League (4):

- Winners 1999–2000, 2001–02, 2007–08, 2014–15
- Runners-up 1991–92, 2000–01, 2004–05, 2006–07, 2010–11

- Sultan Qaboos Cup (4):

- Winners 1993, 2001, 2010, 2014–15
- Runners-up 1997, 2000, 2019–20

- Oman Super Cup (4):

- Winners 2000, 2002, 2008, 2011

- Oman Youth League (U-19) (3):

- Winners 2001–02
- Runners-up 1994–95

- Oman Youth League (U-16) – Al-Sharqiya (3):

- Winners 1992–93, 1993–94, 2002–03

== Club performance-international competitions ==
=== AFC competitions ===
- Asian Club Championship : 1 appearance

- 1991 : Qualifying-Round One

- Asian Cup Winners' Cup : 1 appearance

- 1994–95 : First Round

- AFC Cup : 3 appearances

- 2009 : Group Stage
- 2011 : Group Stage
- 2012 : Group Stage

=== UAFA competitions ===
- UAFA Club Cup : 3 appearances

- 2005–06 : Round of 32
- 2007–08 : Round of 32
- 2012–13 : First Round

- Gulf Club Champions Cup: 2 appearances

- 2003 : 4th Position
- 2009–10 : Group Stage

== Players ==
=== First-team squad ===
Note: Flags indicate national team as defined under FIFA eligibility rules; some limited exceptions apply. Players may hold more than one non-FIFA nationality.

No.	Pos.	Nation	Player
1	GK	OMA	Jarah Al-Tarshi
20	GK	OMA	Ahmed Al-Qulhati
22	GK	OMA	Riyadh Al-Alawi
72	GK	OMA	Ibrahim Saleh Al-Mukhaini
2	DF	OMA	Abdullah Saleh Al-Mukhaini
3	DF	OMA	Mazin Al-Alawi
4	DF	OMA	Mohammed Al-Mukhaini
6	DF	OMA	Hassan Mudhafar Al-Gheilani
11	DF	OMA	Saad Al-Mukhaini
23	DF	OMA	Saad Al-Araimi
24	DF	OMA	Ahmed Al-Mukhaini
25	DF	OMA	Ibrahim Al-Mukhaini

No.	Pos.	Nation	Player
28	DF	OMA	Rashid Juma Al-Farsi
44	DF	OMA	Faiz Al-Mukhaini
54	DF	OMA	Yasser Al-Mukhaini
69	DF	OMA	Yousuf Al-Mukhaini
7	MF	OMA	Aiman Al-Rahbi
8	MF	OMA	Abdul Majeed Al-Hadi
10	MF	OMA	Younis Mubarak Al-Mahaijri
14	MF	OMA	Ahmed Mishaal Al-Mushrafi
87	MF	OMA	Ibrahim Al-Zadjali
90	MF	KGZ	Edgar Bernhardt
19	FW	OMA	Azwar Al-Hasani
35	FW	OMA	Abdullah Abdul-Hadi
46	FW	OMA	Majid Al-Mukhaini
77	FW	MLI	Moussa Koné

=== Former players ===
- (Brazil) Ewerson Batata

== Personnel ==
=== Technical staff ===
Position	Name
Head coach	(Italy) Fabio Lopez
Assistant coach
Assistant coach	(Oman) Said Nasser Al-Farsi
Goalkeeping coach	Vacant
Team Manager	(Oman) Abdullah Jameel Al-Mukhaini
Team Doctor	(Egypt) Khaled El-Shamy

== See also ==
- List of football clubs in Oman
