= Gaston Molina =

Argentine footballer

Personal information
- Full name: Gaston Eduardo Molina
- Date of birth: 23 July 1980
- Place of birth: Jovita, Argentina
- Date of death: 26 February 2010 (aged 29)
- Place of death: Ho Chi Minh City, Vietnam
- Height: 1.75 m (5 ft 9 in)
- Position: Striker

Senior career*
Years	Team	Apps	(Gls)
2002–2005	Liga Roca		
2006–2007	Ferro de Alvear		
2007	Alvear FBC		
2008–2009	SHB Đà Nẵng		
2009–2010	Bình Dương		
- * Club domestic league appearances and goals

Gaston Eduardo Molina (23 July 1980 – 26 February 2010) was an Argentine football striker who last played for V-League club Bình Dương

Nicknamed El Loquillo, Molina was a hard working player both in Argentina and Vietnam and was admired by the fans. In Vietnam, he was a key player of SHB Da Nang as the club won the 2009 title. He was sent away by the club for ill-discipline and Molina subsequently joined Bình Dương in September 2009 and was a key player, helping his team reach the semi-final of the 2009 AFC Cup.

Molina was found dead in a hotel in Ho Chi Minh City on 26 February 2010. The cause was initially believed to be drug overdose.
