= Mohamed Jarragh =

Kuwaiti footballer (born 1981)

Personal information
- Full name: Mohamed Abdel Rahim Abdel Karim Jarragh (Arabic:محمد عبد الرحيم عبد الكريم جراغ)
- Date of birth: November 10, 1981 (age 45)
- Place of birth: Kuwait City, Kuwait
- Height: 1.79 m (5 ft 10 in)
- Position: Central midfielder

Youth career
- 1995: Al Arabi

Senior career*
Years	Team	Apps	(Gls)
1998–2016	Al Arabi	508	(75)
2012–2013	Al-Salmiya SC (loan)	13	(3)

International career^{‡}
2001–2010	Kuwait	64	(4)
- * Club domestic league appearances and goals as of January 10, 2016 ‡ National team caps and goals as of July 10, 2014

Mohamed Jarragh (Arabic: محمد جراغ; born 10 November 1981) is a Kuwaiti footballer who plays in midfield for his club Al Arabi and the Kuwait national football team. Jarragh was born at Madina-al-Kuwayt. He is known as the Mystro in central midfielder.
