= Win Cho =

Burmese football referee

- Full name: Win Cho
- Born: August 10, 1974 (age 52)

International
Years	League	Role
2004-	FIFA listed	Referee

Sergeant Win Cho (born 10 August 1974) is a Burmese football referee. He officiates in the Myanmar National League.

Win Cho became a FIFA referee in 2004. He refereed at the 2006 AFC Challenge Cup, 2010 AFF Suzuki Cup, and other international competitions.
