= Robert Akaruye =

Nigerian footballer

Personal information
- Date of birth: 28 March 1981 (age 45)
- Place of birth: Warri, Nigeria
- Height: 1.76 m (5 ft 9 in)
- Position: Forward

Senior career*
| Years | Team | Apps | (Gls) |
| 1996 | Julius Berger F.C. | | |
| 1997 | Lobi Bank | | |
| 1998 | Eagle Cement | | |
| 1999–2000 | Lobi Stars F.C. | | |
| 2001–2004 | Al Ahly | | |
| 2004–2005 | Mokawloon al-Arab | | |
| 2005–2006 | Dhafra | | |
| 2006 | Ismaily | | |
| 2006 | Busaiteen Club | | |
| 2007 | Sivasspor | | |
| 2008 | Busaiteen | | |
| 2009 | Al-Ahed | | |

International career^{‡}
| 2004–2006 | Nigeria | 1 | (0) |
- * Club domestic league appearances and goals as of 21 April 2008 ‡ National team caps and goals as of 20 May 2002

Robert Akaruye (born 28 March 1981) is a Nigerian former football player. He previously played for Sivasspor in Turkey and represented Nigeria on one occasion.

== Career ==
The Al Ahed striker suffered on Monday 14 December 2009 in a serious car accident on the road to the Beirut airport.

== International career ==
He played his one and only cap for the Nigeria national football team on 20 June 2004 in Luanda against Angola.

== Honour and titles ==
=== Individual ===
- 2009 AFC Cup top scorer.
