= Azrul Ahmad =

Malaysian footballer

Personal information
- Full name: Mohd Azrul bin Ahmad
- Date of birth: 25 March 1985 (age 41)
- Place of birth: Penang, Malaysia
- Height: 1.75 m (5 ft 9 in)
- Positions: Midfielder; defender

Team information
- Current team: Kelantan
- Number: 25

Youth career
- 2004: Penang President Cup

Senior career*
Years	Team	Apps	(Gls)
2005–2008	Penang		
2009	Kedah		(7)
2010	Perlis		(4)
2011–2013	Felda United	37	(7)
2014	ATM		
2015–2019	Penang	72	(1)
2020–	Kelantan	10	(0)

International career^{‡}
2007	Malaysia U-23	5	(0)
- * Club domestic league appearances and goals as of March 19, 2020 ‡ National team caps and goals as of January 23, 2017

Mohd Azrul Ahmad (born 25 March 1985, in Penang, Malaysia) is a Malaysian professional football player who plays as a midfielder for Kelantan in the Malaysia Premier League.

== Club career ==
Azrul made his debut with Penang in 2005. A transfer from Penang to Kedah was confirmed on 16 October 2008 when he and his teammate Mohd Farizal Rozali signed a two-year contract with the team.

During the 2009 season, he signed with Perlis and later signed with Felda United in 2011. After two seasons with Felda United, Azrul signed with ATM for 2014 season.

=== Penang FA ===
Azrul went back to where he started, The Panthers Penang FA. Since then, he is plying his trade with The Panthers.

== International career ==
Azrul earned his first international call-up while at Penang where he was a part of Malaysia squad for the 2008 Olympic Games qualification round. He played five out of six matches during the qualification with three of them as substitutions.

== Honours ==
Kedah

- Malaysian Charity Cup runners-up: 2009

Penang

- Malaysia Premier League runners-up: 2015
