= Mohd Farizal Rozali =

Malaysian footballer

Farizal Rozali
Personal information
- Full name: Mohd Farizal bin Rozali
- Date of birth: 10 September 1983 (age 43)
- Place of birth: Perak, Malaysia
- Positions: Striker; right wing

Team information
- Current team: MOF FC
- Number: 7

Youth career
- 2004–2005: Penang

Senior career*
Years	Team	Apps	(Gls)
2005–2008	Penang	58	(10)
2009	Kedah	12	(3)
2011	Perlis	22	(10)
2012	PBAPP FC	24	(15)
2013	SPA FC	7	(2)
2014	Perlis	2	(1)
2015	Kedah United	12	(3)
2016–	MOF FC	23	(7)
- * Club domestic league appearances and goals as of 20 January 2014 ‡ National team caps and goals as of 14 April 2013

Mohd Farizal Rozali (born 10 September 1983 in Selama, Perak), often known as Jai among teammates and fans, is a Malaysian football player who currently plays in Malaysia FAM League for MOF FC.

== Career ==
Farizal previously played for northern teams Perlis FA, Kedah FA and Penang FA.

On 16 October 2008, he signed a two-year contract that confirmed his transfer from Penang to Kedah. When Kedah publicly announced Farizal's transfer, Farizal was handed the number 10 shirt; Kedah heavyweight Nelson San Martín had previously worn that number. Farizal spoke of his excitement at having joined Kedah and his eagerness to prove himself worthy as an exchange of Marlon Alex James.

In 2012, he joined PBAPP FC, a team which played in the third-tier 2012 Malaysia FAM League. In 2013, he changed clubs again, this time to Malaysia Premier League side SPA FC.

=== Perlis FA ===
In 2014, Farizal Rozali played with Perlis FA

=== Kedah United F.C. ===
In 2015, Farizal Rozali played with Kedah United F.C. in 2015 Malaysia FAM League.

== Style of play ==
Farizal plays forward and on the flank side. Farizal has a preference for playing on the right wing, as this gives him opportunities to cut inside and take shots with his right foot, which he favours.
