= Huỳnh Kesley Alves =

Vietnamese footballer (born 1981)

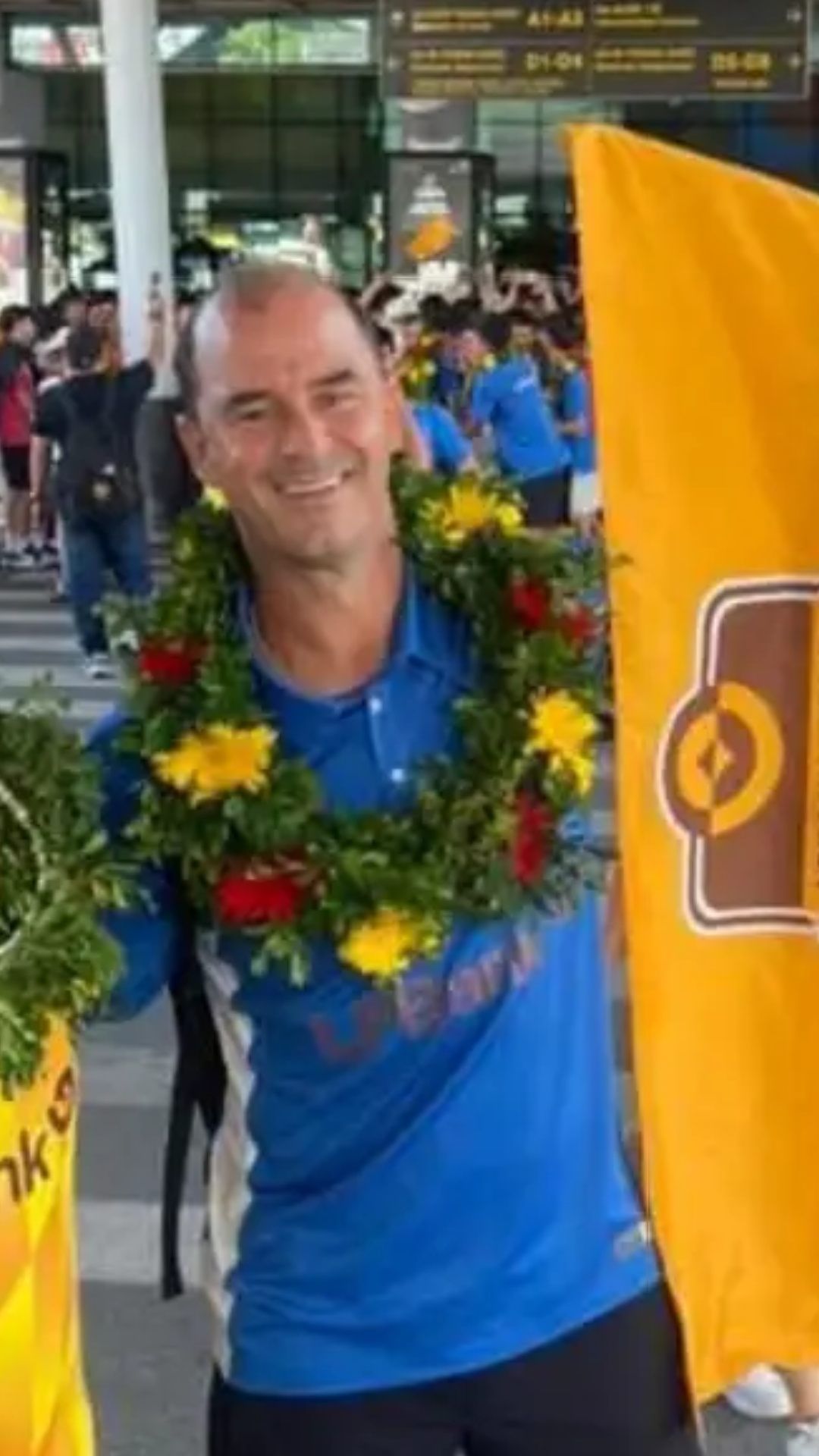
- Alves in 2024

Personal information
- Full name: Huỳnh Kesley Alves
- Date of birth: 23 December 1981 (age 44)
- Place of birth: Palmeiras, Brazil
- Height: 1.80 m (5 ft 11 in)
- Position: Striker

Youth career
- Portuguesa

Senior career*
Years	Team	Apps	(Gls)
2002–2003	Portuguesa	18	(1)
2003	Vasco da Gama	20	(9)
2004	Desportiva	27	(5)
2005	Matsubara	10	(4)
2005	Becamex Bình Dương	32	(21)
2006	Hoàng Anh Gia Lai	16	(6)
2007–2010	Becamex Bình Dương	17	(36)
2011–2012	Sài Gòn Xuân Thành	24	(31)
2013–2014	Becamex Bình Dương	19	(10)
2015	Đồng Nai	10	(0)
2015	Sanna Khánh Hòa BVN	11	(2)
2016–2017	Kasetsart	28	(10)
2018	Krabi	13	(1)
2018–2019	Hồ Chí Minh City	24	(7)
2022	Becamex Bình Dương	5	(0)
2023	Định Hướng Phú Nhuận	?	(?)
2024	LPBank HCMC	?	(?)

International career
2009	Vietnam	1	(0)

Managerial career
- 2021–2022: Becamex Bình Dương (assistant)
- * Club domestic league appearances and goals as of 25 July 2022

Huỳnh Kesley Alves or Kesley Alves (born 23 December 1981) is a professional footballer who plays as a striker. Born in Brazil, he represented Vietnam at international level.

== Playing career ==
In 2005, he came to Vietnam and signed for Becamex Bình Dương from Matsubara in 2005 and became one of the greatest foreigners in the V-League. He gained Vietnamese citizenship in 2009 and earned one cap with Vietnam national football team.

Alves announced his retirement in 2019. He became the assistant manager of Becamex Bình Dương in 2021, before he was registered in the club’s squad list for the second part of the season during the 2022 season, making his comeback from retirement.

In 2024, he joined LPBank Ho Chi Minh City in Vietnamese Second Division.

== International career ==
In 2009, Kesley became a Vietnamese citizen. In the same year, Kesley was called up for the Vietnam national football team by coach Henrique Calisto. He made his debut in a friendly match against Kuwait on May 31, 2009.

== Personal life ==
His wife is Huynh Thi Le Loc, a Vietnamese. He has two Vietnamese-born son. One of his son, Huynh Kelvin Alves (born in 2009) has participated in The Voice Kids of Vietnam season 8.

== Honours ==
=== Club ===
Becamex Bình Dương

- V.League 1 (3): 2007, 2008, 2014
- Vietnamese Super Cup (2): 2007, 2008

Sài Gòn Xuân Thành

- V.League 2 (1): 2011
- Vietnamese National Cup (1): 2012

=== Individual ===
- Best foreign player of V-League 2005
- Top goal-scorer of V-League 2005
- Top goal-scorer of 2009 AFC Cup
- Vietnamese Golden Boot Award 2009
