= Gò Đậu Stadium =

Stadium in Thủ Dầu Một, Vietnam

Coordinates: 10°58′12″N 106°40′19″E

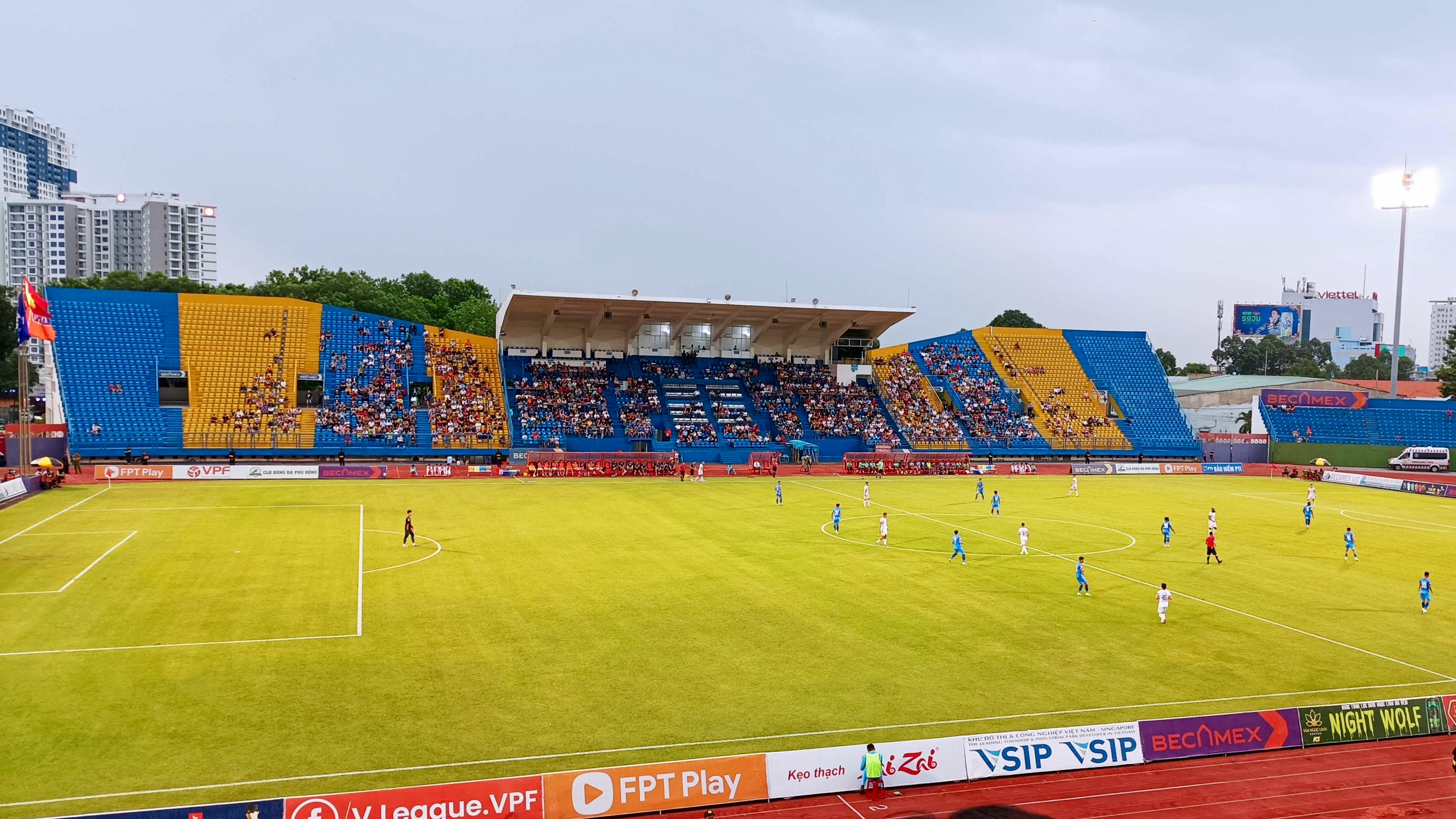
- Interactive map of Gò Đậu Stadium
- Address: Corner of Bình Dương Avenue, April 30th Street, Thủ Dầu Một ward, Ho Chi Minh City; Vietnam
- Owner: Becamex Ho Chi Minh City FC
- Operator: Vietnam Football Federation
- Capacity: 18,250
- Surface: Grass

Construction
- Groundbreaking: 1973
- Built: 1973–1975
- Opened: 26 September 1975
- Renovated: 19 September 1985
- Cost: US$ 40 million
- Architect: Hanoi International Group

Tenants
- Becamex Ho Chi Minh City; Vietnam national football team (Selected matches)

Gò Đậu Stadium (Vietnamese: Sân vận động Gò Ðậu), officially known as Bình Dương Stadium (Vietnamese: Sân vận động Bình Dương), is a multi-purpose stadium in Ho Chi Minh City, Vietnam. It is currently used mostly for football matches and is the home stadium of Becamex Ho Chi Minh City FC. The stadium holds 18,250 people.

== Events ==
- 7 May 2011: Super Junior - 3rd Asia Tour: Super Show 3

== International football matches ==
Date	Competition	Team 1	Res.	Team 2
2 July 2014	Friendly	Vietnam	6–0	Myanmar
19 March 2025	Friendly	Vietnam	2–1	Cambodia
25 March 2025	2027 AFC Asian Cup qualification	Vietnam	5–0	Laos
9 October 2025	2027 AFC Asian Cup qualification	Vietnam	3–1	Nepal
