= 2024–25 Chonburi F.C. season =

Chonburi
2024-25 season
- Chairman: (Thailand) Wittaya Khunpluem
- Manager: (Thailand) Pipob On-Mo
- Stadium: Chonburi Stadium, Mueang Chonburi, Chonburi, Thailand
- Thai League T2: -
- Thai FA Cup: -
- Thai League Cup: -
- Top goalscorer: League: - All: -

The 2024–25 season is Chonburi's first season back in the Thai League T2 since being promoted to Thailand's top flight in Thai Football in 2005 after 18 consecutive seasons in the Thai League 1.

On June 27, 2024, Thai League announced the program for the upcoming 2024-25 Thai League 2 season. The season commenced on August 10, 2024, and will conclude on April 26, 2025 while the play-off will play between May 3, 2025 and May 24, 2025.

On May 26, 2024, Chonburi announced that ex-Chonburi player, Pipob On-Mo will become their new head coach for the new season. Also, another ex-player, Sinthaweechai Hathairattanakool became the club's new manager replacing Sasis Singtothong, who announced that he would leave the club to take responsibility following the club's relegation to the second tier.

== Players ==
As of 10 August 2024

Squad No.	Name	Nationality	Date of birth (age)	Previous club
Goalkeepers
22	Chommaphat Boonloet	(Thailand)	17 February 2003 (age 22)	Youth team
46	Noppakun Kadtoon	(Thailand)	12 October 1994 (age 31)	(Thailand) Rayong F.C.
87	Thanawat Panthong	(Thailand)	6 April 2004 (age 21)	(Thailand) Banbueng F.C.
90	Trisanu Kuptanavin	(Thailand)	10 February 2006 (age 19)	Youth team
Defenders
3	Chatmongkol Rueangthanarot	(Thailand)	9 May 2002 (age 23)	Youth team
4	Kittipong Sansanit	(Thailand)	22 March 1999 (age 26)	(Thailand) Samut Prakan City F.C.
5	Charlie Clough	(England)	4 September 1990 (age 35)	(Thailand) Port F.C.
6	Songchai Thongcham	(Thailand)	9 June 2001 (age 24)	Youth team
15	Jakkapong Sanmahung	(Thailand)	6 April 2002 (age 23)	Youth team
51	Nitipong Sanmahung	(Thailand)	4 March 1996 (age 29)	(Thailand) Nakhon Si United F.C.
86	Parinya Nusong	(Thailand)	7 April 2005 (age 20)	Youth team
91	Phongsakon Trisat	(Thailand)	19 March 2001 (age 24)	Youth team
Midfielders
10	Channarong Promsrikaew (captain)	(Thailand)	17 April 2001 (age 24)	Youth team
16	Jeon San-hae	(South Korea)	29 May 1999 (age 26)	(South Korea) Jeonju Citizen FC
18	Santipap Ratniyorm	(Thailand)	4 September 1992 (age 33)	(Thailand) Trat F.C.
19	Kasidit Kalasin	(Thailand)	2 July 2004 (age 21)	Youth team
20	Suksan Bunta	(Thailand)	5 May 2002 (age 23)	Youth team
26	Theerapat Kaewphung	(Thailand)	26 December 2000 (age 25)	(Thailand) Banbueng F.C.
32	Rachata Moraksa	(Thailand)	21 February 2000 (age 25)	Youth team
52	Phatsakorn On-mo	(Thailand)	25 May 2009 (age 16)	Youth team
93	Siraphop Wandee	(Thailand)	22 January 2004 (age 22)	Youth team
94	Yosakorn Natsit	(Thailand)	29 May 2004 (age 21)	Youth team
98	Naphat Chumpanya	(Thailand)	26 February 2007 (age 18)	Youth team
Forwards
8	Yotsakorn Burapha	(Thailand)	8 June 2005 (age 20)	Youth team
9	Fergus Tierney	(Malaysia) (Scotland)	19 March 2003 (age 22)	(Malaysia) Johor Darul Ta'zim II F.C.
11	Patipat Kamsat	(Thailand)	5 January 1996 (age 30)	(Thailand) Chanthaburi F.C.
33	Derley	(Brazil)	29 December 1987 (age 38)	(Thailand) PT Prachuap F.C.
81	Amadou Ouattara	(Ivory Coast)	30 December 1990 (age 35)	(Thailand) Nakhon Ratchasima F.C.
97	Ruengchai Kesada	(Thailand)	27 July 2005 (age 20)	Youth team
Players loaned out / left during season
99	Marcus Haber	(Canada)	11 January 1989 (age 37)	(Cambodia) Preah Khan Reach Svay Rieng FC

== Transfer ==
=== Pre-season transfer ===
==== In ====
Position	Player	Transferred from	Fee	Ref
FW	(Canada) Marcus Haber	(Cambodia) Preah Khan Reach Svay Rieng FC	Free	
MF	(Thailand) Santipap Ratniyorm	(Thailand) Trat F.C.	Free	
DF	(Thailand) Nitipong Sanmahung	(Thailand) Nakhon Si United F.C.	Free	
GK	(Thailand) Noppakun Kadtoon	(Thailand) Rayong F.C.	Free	
FW	(Thailand) Patipat Kamsat	(Thailand) Chanthaburi F.C.	Free	
FW	(Malaysia) (Scotland) Fergus Tierney	(Malaysia) Johor Darul Ta'zim II F.C.	Free	
MF	(South Korea) Jeon San-hae	Unattached (Note: Most recently played for Jeonju Citizen FC)	Free	
FW	(Brazil) Derley	(Thailand) PT Prachuap F.C.	Free	

==== Loan In ====
Position	Player	Loaned From	Fee	Ref
DF	(England) Charlie Clough	(Thailand) Port F.C.	Season loan	

==== Out ====
Position	Player	Transferred To	Fee	Ref
MF	(South Korea) Lee Chan-dong	(South Korea) Daegu FC	Free	
DF	(Cameroon) (France) Yannick M'Boné	(France) FC Versailles 78	Free	
FW	(Brazil) Murilo	(Brazil) EC Primavera	Free	
GK	(Philippines) Patrick Deyto	(Philippines) Kaya F.C.–Iloilo	Free	
GK	(Thailand) Chanin Sae-ear	(Thailand) Port F.C.	Free	
DF	(Thailand) Noppanon Kachaplayuk	(Thailand) Mahasarakham SBT F.C.	Free	
MF	(Thailand) Phanuphong Phonsa	(Thailand) Khon Kaen United F.C.	Free	
DF	(Thailand) Chalermpong Kerdkaew	(Thailand) Rayong F.C.	Free	
MF	(Thailand) Phitak Pimpae	(Thailand) Police Tero F.C.	Free	
GK	(Thailand) Supawat Yokakul	(Thailand) Suphanburi F.C.	Free	
MF	(Thailand) Rattaphum Mompiboon	(Thailand) Chainat Hornbill F.C.	Free	
FW	(Brazil) Willian Lira	(United Arab Emirates) Hatta Club	Free	
FW	(Brazil) Caion	Unattached	End of contract	
MF	(Thailand) Kroekrit Thaweekarn	Unattached	End of contract	
GK	(Thailand) Chakhon Philakhlang	Unattached	End of contract	

==== Loan Out ====
Position	Player	Loaned To	Fee	Ref
MF	(Thailand) Saharat Sontisawat	(Thailand) Trat F.C.	Season loan	
FW	(Thailand) Sittichok Paso	(Thailand) Trat F.C.	Season loan	
DF	(Thailand) Warakorn Thongbai	(Thailand) Trat F.C.	Season loan	
DF	(Thailand) Bukkoree Lemdee	(Thailand) Chiangmai United F.C.	Season loan	
DF	(Thailand) Thanachai Nathanakool	(Thailand) Samut Prakan City F.C.	Season loan	
MF	(Thailand) Pacharaphol Lekkun	(Thailand) Samut Prakan City F.C.	Season loan	
FW	(Canada) Marcus Haber	(Thailand) Nongbua Pitchaya F.C.	Season loan	

=== Mid-season transfer ===
==== In ====
Position	Player	Transferred from	Fee	Ref

==== Loan In ====
Position	Player	Loaned From	Fee	Ref

==== Out ====
Position	Player	Transferred To	Fee	Ref

==== Loan Out ====
Position	Player	Loaned To	Fee	Ref

== Competitions ==
=== Overview ===
Competition	First match	Last match	Starting round	Record							
Competition	First match	Last match	Starting round	Pld	W	D	L	GF	GA	GD	Win %
Thai League 2	9 August 2024	26 April 2025	Matchday 1	32	19	6	7	56	30	+26	59.38
FA Cup	20 November 2024	29 January 2025	First Round	2	1	0	1	3	3	+0	50.00
League Cup	5 February 2025		First Round	1	0	0	1	0	4	−4	0.00
Total				35	20	6	9	59	37	+22	57.14

Last updated: 29 April 2025
Source: Competitions

=== Thai League 2 ===
==== League table ====
Pos	Team	Pld	W	D	L	GF	GA	GD	Pts	Qualification
1	Chonburi (C, P)	32	19	6	7	56	30	+26	63	Promotion to Thai League 1
2	Ayutthaya United (P)	32	17	9	6	57	30	+27	60	Promotion to Thai League 1
3	Phrae United (Q)	32	17	7	8	61	38	+23	58	Play off to Thai League 1
4	Kanchanaburi Power (Q)	32	13	13	6	53	36	+17	52	Play off to Thai League 1
5	Mahasarakham (Q)	32	13	9	10	44	39	+5	48 (Note: Mahasarakham is ahead on the head-to-head record; Mahasarakham 4 pts , Lampang 1 pts.)	Play off to Thai League 1

Updated to match(es) played on 28 April 2025. Source: Thai League
Rules for classification: 1) Points; 2) Head-to-head points; 3) Head-to-head goals difference; 4) Head-to-head goals scored; 5) Overall goals difference; 6) Overall goals scored; 7) Fair play points; 8) Play-off without extra time;).
(C) Champions; (P) Promoted; (Q) Qualified for the phase indicated

==== Results summary ====
Overall								Home						Away					
Pld	W	D	L	GF	GA	GD	Pts	W	D	L	GF	GA	GD	W	D	L	GF	GA	GD
32	19	6	7	56	30	+26	63	12	2	2	37	14	+23	7	4	5	19	16	+3

==== Matches ====
Win Draw Loss

9 August 2024 1	Chonburi	4-0	Suphanburi	Chonburi
	Tierney 1'; Suksan 65'; Ouattara 82'; Clough 87'			Stadium: Chonburi Stadium; Attendance: 4,359; Referee: Kitisak Pikunngoen

17 August 2024 2	Kanchanaburi Power	0-1	Chonburi	Kanchanaburi
			Yotsakorn 43'	Stadium: Kanchanaburi Province Stadium; Attendance: 2,491; Referee: Wichate Tainthong

24 August 2024 3	Chonburi	v	Samut Prakan

24 August 2024 4	Chonburi	1-0	Samut Prakan City	Chonburi
	Derley 64'			Stadium: Chonburi Stadium; Attendance: 4,459; Referee: Nasri Tamat

1 September 2024 5	Chiangmai United	1-2	Chonburi	Chiang Mai
	Ryo 45'		Ouattara 38' 90+5'	Stadium: 700th Anniversary Stadium; Attendance: 1,594; Referee: Wathanyu Morin

15 September 2024 6	Chonburi	2-1	Lampang	Chonburi
	Derley 21'; Ouattara 58'; Kasidit (yellow card) 87' (yellow-red card) 88'		Judivan 83' (red card) 88'	Stadium: Chonburi Stadium; Attendance: 4,934; Referee: Boonsong Prachumrak

21 September 2024 7	Ayutthaya United	1–1	Chonburi	Ayutthaya
	Bunsan (yellow card) 14'; Caíque 47'; André Luís (yellow card) 61'	Report	Clough (yellow card) 38'; Burapha 48'; Kittipong Sansanit (yellow card) 84'	Stadium: Ayutthaya Provincial Stadium; Referee: (Thailand) Jirayu Lohapom

28 September 2024 8	Chonburi	0–1	Phrae United	Chonburi
19:30 ICT	Thongcham (yellow card) 20'; San-Hae Jeon (yellow card) 71'; Burapha (yellow card) 85'; Ratniyorm (yellow card) 90+4'	Report	Bruno Henrique (yellow card) 20'; Hanpanichkij (yellow card) 34'; Wellington Adão 63'; Srinothai (yellow card) 90+1'	Stadium: Chonburi Stadium; Referee: (Thailand) Narinnart Tiamskun

6 October 2024 9	Bangkok	2–1	Chonburi	Bangkok
19:00 ICT	Sakda Kumkun (yellow card) 42'; Witchaya Pornprasart 45+2'; Sitthichok Mool-on (yellow card) 72'; Padungsak Phothinak 89'; Yannasit Sukcharoen (yellow card) 90+3'	Report	Clough (yellow card) 32'; Ouattara 80'	Stadium: 72nd Anniversary Stadium; Referee: (Thailand) Anon Borisut

19 October 2024 10	Chonburi	2–0	Mahasarakham SBT	Chonburi
19:00 ICT	Rueangthanarot 32'; Ouattara 51'; Derley (yellow card) 68'; San-Hae Jeon (yellow card) 90+4'	Report	Wongma (yellow card) 31'; Darit (yellow card) 37'; Leandro Assumpção (yellow card) 90'; Evson Patrício (yellow card) 90+4'	Stadium: Chonburi Stadium; Referee: (Thailand) Kriangkrai Thiphanunjarukorn

26 October 2024 11	Sisaket United	1–1	Chonburi	Sisaket
19:30 ICT	Danilo 12'; Suphaphon Sutthisak (yellow card) 52'; Caíque Freitas Ribeiro (yellow card) 63'	Report	Theerapat Kaewphung 90'	Stadium: Sri Nakhon Lamduan Stadium; Referee: (Thailand) Direk Kaort

3 November 2024 12	Kasetsart	2–1	Chonburi	Bangkok
18:00 ICT	Kraisorn 45+2' 69' (pen.); Panyawat Nisangram (yellow card) 52'; Wongmeema (yellow card) 90+2'	Report	Sanmahung (yellow card) 17'; Noppakun Kadtoon (yellow card) 67'; Theerapat Kaewphung 90+10'	Stadium: Insee Chantarasatit Stadium; Referee: (Thailand) Prakasit Chantarasawang

9 November 2024 13	Chonburi	1–1	Chainat Hornbill	Chonburi
18:00 ICT	Rueangthanarot (yellow card) 42'; Young-jae Yoo 61' (o.g.)	Report	Nathaphop Kaewklang (yellow card) 45+3'; Young-jae Yoo (yellow card) 48'; Boonma 78'	Stadium: Chonburi Stadium; Referee: (Thailand) Kanoksak Khiaodaeng

24 November 2024 14	Nakhon Si United	3–2	Chonburi	Nakhon Si Thammarat
18:30 ICT	Rodrigo Maranhão (yellow card) 20' (yellow-red card) 88' (goal) 43'; Sensom-Eiad 25'; Vongchiengkham (yellow card) 41'; Ronnayod Mingmitwan (yellow card) 69'; Taninnat Athisaraworameth 88'; Kiattisak Pimyotha (yellow card) 90+9'	Report	Promsrikaew (yellow card) 55'; Derley 71' (pen.); Clough (yellow card) 72'; Phongsakon Trisat (yellow card) 90+5'; Ouattara 90+10'	Stadium: Nakhon Si Thammarat Province Stadium; Referee: (Thailand) Amnat Makklang

1 December 2024 15	Chonburi	1-0	Trat	Chonburi
18:30 ICT	Rueangthanarot 67'; Derley (yellow card) 69'; Parinya Nusong (yellow card) 90+4'	Report	Tanakorn Navanich (yellow card) 45+3'; Attapong Kittijumratsak (yellow card) 90+5'	Stadium: Chonburi Stadium; Referee: (Thailand) Samrit Ritkaew

15 December 2024 16	Chonburi	1-2	Chanthaburi	Chonburi
18:30 ICT	Suksan (yellow card) 48'; Ouattara 52'	Report	Tiago Chulapa 12' (yellow card) 56'; Clyde O'Connell (yellow card) 17'; Rittiporn Wanchuen 27'; Bienvenido Marañón (yellow card) 45+5'; Chaloempat Ploywanrattana (yellow card) 68'; Nattapon Piamplai (yellow card) 73'; Warayut Klomnak (yellow card) 90+9'	Stadium: Chonburi Stadium; Referee: (Thailand) Kitisak Pikunngoen

20 December 2024 17	Pattaya	0-1	Chonburi	Pattaya
		Report		Stadium: Nong Prue Stadium

5 January 2025 18	Chonburi	2-1	Kanchanaburi Power	Chonburi
		Report		Stadium: Chonburi Stadium

12 January 2025 19	Samut Prakan	v	Chonburi

19 January 2025 20	Chonburi	5-2	Chiangmai United	Chonburi
		Report		Stadium: Chonburi Stadium

25 January 2025 21	Lampang	1-1	Chonburi	Lampang
		Report		Stadium: Lampang Provincial Stadium

2 February 2025 22	Chonburi	2-2	Ayutthaya United	Chonburi
		Report		Stadium: Chonburi Stadium

2 February 2025 23	Phrae United	0-0	Chonburi	Phrae
		Report		Stadium: Huaimah Stadium

12 February 2025 24	Chonburi	2-0	Bangkok	Chonburi
		Report		Stadium: Chonburi Stadium

16 February 2025 25	Mahasarakham SBT	2-0	Chonburi	Mahasarakham
		Report		Stadium: Maha Sarakham Provincial Stadium

22 February 2025 26	Chonburi	5-0	Sisaket United	Chonburi
		Report		Stadium: Chonburi Stadium

1 March 2025 27	Chonburi	2-1	Kasetsart	Chonburi
		Report		Stadium: Chonburi Stadium

9 March 2025 28	Chainat Hornbill	1-3	Chonburi	Chainat
		Report		Stadium: Khao Plong Stadium

16 March 2025 29	Chonburi	2-1	Nakhon Si United	Chonburi
		Report		Stadium: Chonburi Stadium

30 March 2025 30	Trat	1-2	Chonburi	Trat
		Report		Stadium: Trat Provincial Central Stadium

2 April 2025 31	Chonburi	4-2	Police Tero	Chonburi
		Report		Stadium: Chonburi Stadium

5 April 2025 32	Chanthaburi	1-0	Chonburi	Chanthaburi
		Report		Stadium: Chanthaburi Stadium

18 April 2025 33	Chonburi	2-0	Pattaya United	Chonburi
		Report		Stadium: Chonburi Stadium

26 April 2025 34	Suphanburi	0-1	Chonburi	Suphanburi
		Report		Stadium: Suphanburi Municipality Stadium

=== Thai FA Cup ===
==== Matches ====
Win Draw Loss

20 November 2024 Round of 64	Chonburi	2–1	PT Prachuap (T1)	Mueang, Chonburi
18:30 (UTC+7)	Santipap Ratniyorm 6'; Kittipong Sansanit 16'		Airton 66'	Stadium: Chonburi Daikin Stadium; Attendance: 2,955; Referee: Chaireag Ngam-som; Assistant referees: Phubes Lekpha, Pathompong Anunluksanakul; Fourth official: Komgrit Ponpasit

29 January 2025 Round of 32	Nakhon Ratchasima (T1)	2–1	Chonburi	Mueang, Nakhon Ratchasima
18:30 (UTC+7)		Report		Stadium: 80th Birthday Stadium

=== Thai League Cup ===
==== Matches ====
Win Draw Loss

5 February 2025 Round of 32 (Rescheduled)	Chonburi	0–4	Port	Chonburi
18:00		Report; Highlight	Peniel Mlapa 32' (pen.); Felipe Amorim 39', 68'; Anon Amornlerdsak 47'	Stadium: Chonburi Stadium; Attendance: 3,542; Referee: Winat Phophat

== Team statistics ==
=== Appearances and goals ===
As of 15 September 2024

No.	Pos.	Player	League		FA Cup		League Cup		Total	
No.	Pos.	Player	Apps.	Goals	Apps.	Goals	Apps.	Goals	Apps.	Goals
3	DF	(Thailand) Chatmongkol Rueangthanarot	5	0	0	0	0	0	5	0
4	DF	(Thailand) Kittipong Sansanit	2	0	0	0	0	0	2	0
5	DF	(England) Charlie Clough	5	1	0	0	0	0	5	1
6	DF	(Thailand) Songchai Thongcham	5	0	0	0	0	0	5	0
8	FW	(Thailand) Yotsakorn Burapha	5	1	0	0	0	0	5	1
9	FW	(Malaysia) Fergus Tierney	5	1	0	0	0	0	5	1
10	MF	(Thailand) Channarong Promsrikaew	5	0	0	0	0	0	5	0
11	FW	(Thailand) Patipat Kamsat	4	0	0	0	0	0	4	0
15	DF	(Thailand) Jakkapong Sanmahung	5	0	0	0	0	0	5	0
16	MF	(South Korea) Jeon San-hae	5	0	0	0	0	0	5	0
18	MF	(Thailand) Santipap Ratniyorm	2	0	0	0	0	0	2	0
19	MF	(Thailand) Kasidit Kalasin	2	0	0	0	0	0	2	0
20	MF	(Thailand) Suksan Bunta	3	1	0	0	0	0	3	1
26	MF	(Thailand) Theerapat Kaewphung	0	0	0	0	0	0	0	0
32	MF	(Thailand) Rachata Moraksa	3	0	0	0	0	0	3	0
33	FW	(Brazil) Derley	4	2	0	0	0	0	4	2
46	GK	(Thailand) Noppakun Kadtoon	5	0	0	0	0	0	5	0
51	DF	(Thailand) Nitipong Sanmahung	2	0	0	0	0	0	2	0
52	MF	(Thailand) Phatsakorn On-mo	0	0	0	0	0	0	0	0
81	FW	(Ivory Coast) Amadou Ouattara	5	4	0	0	0	0	5	4
86	DF	(Thailand) Parinya Nusong	0	0	0	0	0	0	0	0
87	GK	(Thailand) Thanawat Panthong	0	0	0	0	0	0	0	0
90	GK	(Thailand) Trisanu Kuptanavin	0	0	0	0	0	0	0	0
91	DF	(Thailand) Phongsakon Trisat	0	0	0	0	0	0	0	0
93	MF	(Thailand) Siraphop Wandee	1	0	0	0	0	0	1	0
94	MF	(Thailand) Yosakorn Natsit	0	0	0	0	0	0	0	0
97	FW	(Thailand) Ruengchai Kesada	0	0	0	0	0	0	0	0
98	MF	(Thailand) Naphat Chumpanya	0	0	0	0	0	0	0	0
Players loaned out / left during season
99	FW	(Canada) Marcus Haber	0	0	0	0	0	0	0	0

== Overall summary ==
=== Season summary ===
Games played	5 (5 Thai League 2, 0 FA Cup, 0 League Cup)
Games won	5 (5 Thai League 2, 0 FA Cup, 0 League Cup)
Games drawn	0 (0 Thai League 2, 0 FA Cup, 0 League Cup)
Games lost	0 (0 Thai League 2, 0 FA Cup, 0 League Cup)
Goals scored	10 (10 Thai League 2, 0 FA Cup, 0 League Cup)
Goals conceded	2 (2 Thai League 2, 0 FA Cup, 0 League Cup)
Goal difference	+8
Clean sheets	3 (3 Thai League 2, 0 FA Cup, 0 League Cup)
Best result	4-0 vs Suphanburi (9 Aug 24)
Worst result	
Most appearances	10 players (5)
Top scorer	Amadou Ouattara (4)
Points	15
