= Football at the 2023 SEA Games – Men's tournament final =

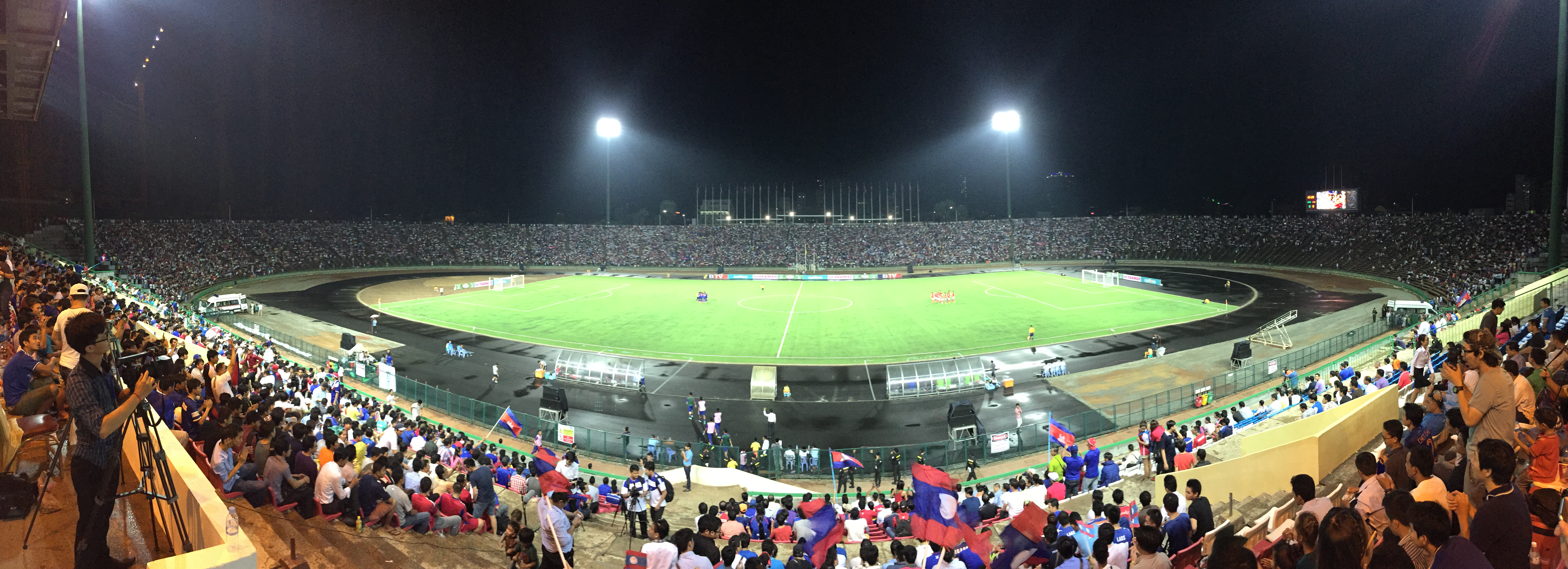
- Olympic Stadium in Phnom Penh, where the match took place
- Event: 2023 SEA Games Gold medal match
Indonesia	Thailand
(Indonesia)	(Thailand)
5	2
- After extra time Indonesia won 5–2 after extra time.
- Date: 16 May 2023
- Venue: Olympic Stadium, Phnom Penh, Cambodia
- Man of the Match: None
- Referee: Qasim Al-Hatmi (Oman)
- Attendance: 28,133
- Weather: Fair; 30 °C (86 °F)

The men's football final at the 2023 Southeast Asian Games was the gold medal match between the under-22 teams of Indonesia and Thailand on May 16, 2023, at the Olympic Stadium in Phnom Penh, Cambodia.

On their journey to the final, Indonesia maintained a perfect record with five consecutive wins, topping Group A and defeating the defending champions Vietnam in the semi-finals. Thailand also finished first in Group B with three wins and one draw before overcoming Myanmar in their semi-final clash. The final was held in front of 28,133 spectators and was officiated by Oman referee Qasim Al-Hatmi. The match lasted for over 120 minutes. Indonesia took an early 2–0 lead, but Thailand managed to equalize 2–2 in the very last seconds of stoppage time.

Moving into extra time, amidst intense drama and heated controversies on the pitch, Indonesia scored three more goals to secure a final 5–2 victory. The victory over Thailand secured Indonesia's first men's football gold medal since 1991, the last time they were crowned champions as a senior national team. However, Indonesia's triumph was overshadowed by unsporting and 'ugly' behavior from both sides, particularly between the end of the second half and the start of the first period of extra time. With a staggering 23 cards (including 9 red cards and 14 yellow cards) were issued to players and coaching staff from both teams, This turned out to be one of the most intense and dramatic SEA Games finals in history, setting a record for the number of penalties handed out, and would eventually be nicknamed the "Battle of Phnom Penh" (Indonesian: Pertempuran Phnom Penh) in Indonesia.

== Pre-match ==
In the past, competing as a senior national team, Indonesia won the gold medal twice: in 1987 on home soil and in 1991 in the Philippines. They also reached the finals in 1979 and 1997. Since their 1991 victory, Indonesian teams had failed to secure another gold medal in men's football. Since the SEA Games men's football tournament was restricted to youth squads in 2001, Indonesia reached the final three times but was unsuccessful on each occasion. Their most recent appearance was in the 2019 final, where U-22 Indonesia suffered a heavy 0–3 defeat against U-22 Vietnam, a result that ended Vietnam's 60-year gold medal drought dating back to 1959.

Thailand, with 16 gold medals, has always been the most successful nation in SEA Games men's football history. Their dominance was most evident during a streak of eight consecutive titles from 1993 to 2007. However, in the last two editions of the Games, they failed to clinch the gold as Vietnam claimed the title both times. In their most recent final in Hanoi, U-23 Thailand lost 0–1 to U-23 Vietnam, courtesy of a lone goal by Nham Manh Dung as they watched their rivals successfully defend the gold medal on home turf.

Indonesia and Thailand have met in three previous SEA Games finals (1991, 1997, 2013), across both senior and U-23/U-22 levels. Aside from their first encounter in 1991, where Indonesia defeated Thailand on penalties, the Thais emerged victorious in the other two. In total, the senior and youth national teams of both sides have faced off 23 times, with Thailand dominating with 16 wins, while Indonesia managed 5 wins, and only two matches ended in a draw. Their most recent meeting took place last year in Vietnam, where Thailand narrowly defeated Indonesia 1–0 in a match that saw four red cards issued to both sides.

Indonesia entered the final without Pratama Arhan, who was sidelined due to a red card received in the semi-final against Vietnam. Meanwhile, Thailand boasted their strongest possible lineup.

== Venue ==
The gold medal match was held on May 16, 2023, at the Phnom Penh Olympic Stadium, located in the heart of the capital city. Before the completion of the Morodok Techo National Stadium, the Olympic Stadium served as Cambodia's national arena and was frequently chosen as the home ground for international matches by the country’s U-23 and senior national teams.

In preparation for the 2023 Southeast Asian Games, the stadium underwent several upgrades, including the replacement of artificial turf with natural grass and the installation of individual seating throughout the stands. The stadium also hosted Group A matches, the semi-finals, and the bronze medal match of the men's tournament, as well as the knockout stages of the women's tournament.

== Road to the final ==
=== Indonesia ===
As the only team to win every match at the 2023 SEA Games, Indonesia emerged as the top favorite for the men’s football gold medal. Additionally, they boasted both the best offense in the tournament with 16 goals scored and the best defense, conceding only 3 times.

Bringing a squad of players who had proven their mettle at youth levels—many with experience in the SEA Games or even the senior national team—combined with a core group from the U-20 generation, Indonesia made no secret of their ambition to claim the top spot. This was seen as a way to restore national pride after being stripped of the hosting rights for the 2023 FIFA U-20 World Cup, a tournament for which Indonesians had high expectations and had prepared rigorously.

In reality, the 'Garuda' started their Group A journey perfectly with a 3–0 victory over Philippines. Marselino Ferdinan opened the scoring late in the first half, while Irfan Jauhari and Fajar Fathur Rahman netted in the closing minutes, despite an earlier penalty miss by Rizky Ridho. Their sheer dominance continued with a 5–0 thrashing of Myanmar, featuring goals from Ramadhan Sananta (a brace, including one penalty), Marselino, Fajar, and Titan Agung. In their third match against a Timor-Leste side coming off a shock three-goal win over the Philippines, Indonesia’s superior class told as they secured another 3–0 win thanks to Sananta and a Fajar double, clinching a semi-final berth with a game to spare. In the final group stage match against hosts Cambodia, even with a rotated lineup, goals from Titan Agung and Beckham Putra were enough to secure the top spot in Group A with a perfect 12 points. Sin Sovannmakara scored a consolation goal for Cambodia late in the first half, marking the only time Indonesia’s defense was breached during the group stage.

In the semi-finals, facing the defending champions and long-time rivals Vietnam, Indra Sjafri’s men took an early lead from a trademark long throw-in by Pratama Arhan, which allowed Komang Teguh to head home inside the box. Van Tung equalized for Vietnam 20 minutes later. In the second half, another Arhan throw-in led to a long-range strike from Marselino that deflected into the net, putting Indonesia ahead once more. However, after losing their numerical advantage when Arhan was sent off for a second yellow card, followed by a Bagas Kaffa own goal that leveled the score, the young Indonesians faced immense pressure for much of the remaining half. Yet, with only minutes left in stoppage time, Taufany Muslihuddin struck a dramatic winner for the 'Men in Red,' sending them through to the final despite playing with ten men.

=== Thailand ===
Thailand also enjoyed a relatively smooth journey in Group B. In their opening match against Singapore, the young 'War Elephants' secured a 3–1 victory in a dominant performance. The goals for the men in blue were scored by Teerasak Poeiphimai, Achitpol Keereerom, and Purachet Thodsanit, while Singapore's Nicky Melvin pulled one back late in the first half.

Facing Malaysia in their second match, the Thai players successfully avenged their unexpected 1–2 loss in their previous encounter in Vietnam. Substitutes Anan Yodsangwal and Yotsakorn Burapha, both brought on in the second half, provided the clinical finishes to secure the win. In the following game against Laos, head coach Issara Sritaro’s side maintained overwhelming possession against their neighbors, resulting in a commanding 4–1 win. Yotsakorn and Teerasak each netted a brace before Roman Angot scored a consolation goal from the penalty spot for Laos.

This victory ensured Thailand's early qualification for the semi-finals, despite having one remaining group match against Vietnam—their direct rival for the top spot. In a rematch of the previous year's gold medal final, Thailand took an early lead through Achitpol, but Le Quoc Nhat Nam equalized for Vietnam in the second half. Finishing level on 10 points with Vietnam but possessing a superior goal difference, Thailand clinched first place in the group. Facing a much lower-rated Myanmar in the semi-finals, Thailand cruised to a comfortable 3–0 win with goals from Teerasak, Leon James, and Anan.

== The match ==
=== First half ===
The final kicked off at 7:30 PM local time, with Thailand taking the opening kick-off. Right after referee Al-Hatmi’s whistle, Indra Sjafri’s side immediately asserted their dominance by pushing their lineup high up the pitch. Their first opportunity came in the 3rd minute when Marselino unleashed a long-range 'thunderbolt' that whistled over the crossbar. Four minutes later, goalkeeper Ernando rushed out to challenge Teerasak outside the penalty area to stop a Thai counter-attack, earning the match's first yellow card. In the 10th minute, Marselino again dribbled through the opposition's defense, but his shot went high. In the 18th minute, center-back Komang moved up and fired a surprise long-range effort that missed the target.

However, Indonesia did not have to wait long for the opening goal in the 21st minute. From Dewangga’s trademark long throw-in, striker Sananta made a glancing header that deflected off Thai defender Songchai and into the net, leaving goalkeeper Soponwit helpless. U-22 Thailand attempted to push forward in search of an equalizer, creating several threats against Ernando’s goal in the closing minutes of the half, but to no avail. They even conceded again in the final minute of first-half stoppage time, as Sananta capitalized on a lack of communication between the Thai center-backs to lob the ball over Soponwit into an empty net, following a long ball from Ridho. The first half concluded with a two-goal cushion for Indonesia.

=== Second half ===
At the start of the second half, Thailand brought on attacking midfielder Purachet for Chayapipat to bolster their offense, while Ananda replaced Muhammad Taufany for Indonesia. The 'Men in Red' maintained a disciplined defensive structure, frequently committing tactical fouls far from their goal to disrupt the opponent's rhythm. Meanwhile, Thailand continued to push high in search of a breakthrough. In the 52nd minute, Settasit unleashed a powerful low drive following a slick combination play, forcing goalkeeper Ernando into a diving save. In the 58th minute, Ernando went down after a collision; Teerasak received a yellow card for pulling the keeper's jersey, accusing him of time-wasting.

Thailand’s persistence paid off in the 65th minute. From a Channarong corner on the left, Anan climbed highest to power home a header, narrowing the gap to 1–2. The goal shifted the momentum into a breathless contest: Indonesia sat back to exploit counter-attacking opportunities, while Thailand relentlessly besieged the Indonesian goal. As the clock ticked down, both sides saw golden chances. In the 87th minute, a rapid Indonesian counter saw the ball played to Witan, but a heavy touch allowed Soponwit to smother the angle. Thailand immediately responded through Teerasak, whose effort was denied by Ernando’s crucial intervention. During stoppage time, Indonesian players frequently went to ground and utilized substitutions to run down the clock.

The match reached a boiling point in the 9th minute of stoppage time. The Indonesian bench prematurely stormed the pitch to celebrate as the referee blew his whistle, thinking the game was over. However, they had mistaken the signal for a Thai free-kick. Capitalizing on this final lifeline, substitute Yotsakorn Burapha danced into the box, bypassed two defenders, and rifled a shot past Ernando to snatch a dramatic 2–2 equalizer. The resulting free kick equalized the score and the first brawl started after Indonesian player Titan Agung pushed one of the Thai coaches who celebrated by running towards the Indonesian bench.

In the ensuing euphoria, the Thai bench and players sprinted across the field, even reaching the Indonesian technical area to celebrate provocatively in front of their rivals. In retaliation, Indonesian substitute Titan Agung charged at and kicked a member of the Thai coaching staff, triggering a massive brawl between both sides. Both individuals were subsequently shown straight red cards. The Indonesian camp reacted heatedly to the referee’s decisions, requiring stadium police to intervene. Tied at 2–2 after 90 minutes, the match headed into extra time.

=== Extra time and controversial brawl ===
Right from the first minute of the first period of extra time, capitalizing on a blunder by defender Songchai Thongcham, Irfan Jauhari surged into the box and executed a clinical chip over goalkeeper Soponwit, putting Indonesia ahead 3–2. This time, it was Indonesia’s turn to retaliate with their celebration, triggering an even more violent brawl on the sidelines.

A swarm of players, officials, and staff from both teams engaged in a physical altercation, trading punches and kicks. Indonesia’s team manager, Kombes Pol Sumardji, stepped in to de-escalate the situation but was struck by several Thai members, leaving him with a bloodied nose and mouth. The chaotic scene only subsided when riot police intervened. The referee had to consult match officials to identify the aggressors, ultimately brandishing a total of five red cards to players and coaching staff. Among those sent off were Thai goalkeeper Soponwit and Indonesian center-back Komang for violent conduct right in front of the referee, along with two Thai staff members and one from the Indonesian side. The match was suspended for over eight minutes.

In the 102nd minute, center-back Jonathan Khemdee received a second yellow card and was sent off following a foul on an Indonesian player. With a significant numerical advantage, the 'Garuda' launched a relentless assault on the Thai defense, with Fajar and Marselino creating a string of dangerous opportunities. Consequently, in the 106th minute, Fajar executed a sharp turn and fired a precise strike from the edge of the box to net Indonesia’s fourth goal.

As the second period of extra time wore on, the 'Men in Blue' showed clear signs of exhaustion and struggled to compete physically. While they escaped a penalty shout after a foul on Fajar in the box, they were soon reduced to just eight men on the pitch when Teerasak picked up his second yellow card. Trailing in goals and depleted in numbers and energy, U-22 Thailand conceded a fifth goal to Beckham Putra in the 120th minute. Ultimately, Indonesia secured a 5–2 victory over Thailand, claiming their first gold medal after a 32-year wait.

=== Details ===
16 May 2023
19:30

Indonesia	5–2 (a.e.t.)	Thailand
Sananta 20', 45+5'; Irfan 91'; Fajar 107'; Beckham 120'	Report	Anan 65'; Yotsakorn 90+10'

Olympic Stadium, Phnom Penh
Attendance: 28,133
Referee: Qasim Al-Hatmi (Oman)

GK	20	Ernando Ari	(yellow card) 7'
RB	2	Bagas Kaffa
CB	19	Alfeandra Dewangga	(yellow card) 67'	(substituted off) 70'
CB	5	Rizky Ridho (c)
LB	13	Haykal Alhafiz		(substituted off) 106'
DM	4	Komang Teguh	(yellow card) 28' (red card) 94'
RM	8	Witan Sulaeman		(substituted off) 90+3'
CM	15	Taufany Muslihuddin		(substituted off) 46'
CM	7	Marselino Ferdinan
LM	14	Fajar Fathur Rahman
CF	9	Ramadhan Sananta	(yellow card) 48'	(substituted off) 55'
Substitutions:
GK	1	Adi Satryo
DF	3	Rio Fahmi		(substituted on) 90+3'
DF	16	Muhammad Ferarri		(substituted on) 70'
MF	6	Ananda Raehan		(substituted on) 46'
MF	10	Beckham Putra	(yellow card) 120+1'	(substituted on) 106'
FW	11	Jeam Kelly Sroyer
FW	17	Irfan Jauhari		(substituted on) 55'
FW	18	Titan Agung	(red card) 90+11'
Manager:
Indra Sjafri*

GK	1	Soponwit Rakyart	(red card) 94'
RB	2	Bukkoree Lemdee		(substituted off) 30'
CB	5	Songchai Thongcham		(substituted off) 95'
CB	4	Jonathan Khemdee	(yellow card) 28' (yellow-red card) 102'
LB	3	Chatmongkol Rueangthanarot	(yellow card) 41'
CM	6	Airfan Doloh (c)	(yellow card) 73'	(substituted off) 73'
CM	19	Chayapipat Supunpasuch	(yellow card) 8'	(substituted off) 46'
RW	7	Channarong Promsrikaew
AM	17	Settasit Suwannasit		(substituted off) 87'
LW	10	Achitpol Keereerom		(substituted off) 30'
CF	8	Teerasak Poeiphimai	(yellow card) 58' (yellow-red card) 118'
Substitutions:
GK	20	Thirawut Sraunson		(substituted on) 95'
DF	12	Apisit Saenseekammuan	(yellow card) 78'	(substituted on) 73'
DF	13	Pongsakorn Trisat		(substituted on) 30'
DF	15	Jakkapong Sanmahung
MF	14	Purachet Thodsanit		(substituted on) 46'
MF	16	Leon James
MF	18	Thirapak Prueangna
FW	9	Yotsakorn Burapha		(substituted on) 87'
FW	11	Anan Yodsangwal	(yellow card) 90+7'	(substituted on) 30'
Manager:
Issara Sritaro**

Player of the Match:
Ramadhan Sananta (Indonesia)

Assistant referees:
Muhammad Ali (Pakistan)
Sayed Ali (Kuwait)
Fourth official:
Ashkanani Ammar (Kuwait)

Match rules

- 90 minutes
- 30 minutes of extra time if necessary
- Penalty shoot-out if scores still level
- Maximum of seven named substitutes
- Maximum of five substitutions, with a sixth allowed in extra time
- Maximum of three substitution opportunities, with a fourth allowed in extra time

*An assistant coaches of Indonesia received a red card. **3 assistant coaches of Thailand received red cards.

== Media ==
The final was broadcast live on RCTI, alongside the Television Pool of Thailand and T Sport 7. Although the host nation, Cambodia, provided free broadcasting rights for this match and all other events at the Games—allowing most countries in the region to air the event for free—some nations (including Indonesia) placed the content on pay-per-view platforms. Consequently, many fans (primarily from Indonesia) turned to broadcasting platforms from other countries to watch the game, most notably livestreams from Vietnam Television.

According to the ASEAN Football Facebook page, 2.5 million people watched the match live on VTV's YouTube channel, with a peak of 1.8 million concurrent viewers. By the afternoon of May 17, just one day after the match concluded, the livestream replay of the U-22 Indonesia vs. U-22 Thailand clash on this channel skyrocketed to over 14 million views, the highest of any match of that year's SEA Games uploaded to the channel.

Despite facing competition for viewership in Indonesia, RCTI’s live broadcast of the final topped the ratings charts on May 17 with a 33.2% audience share, according to reports from the Instagram account indotvtrends.

== Post-match ==
Indonesia clinched their third SEA Games men's football gold medal in history, marking their first title since defeating Thailand in 1991 and ending a 32-year trophy drought. This victory was Indonesia's first since men's football became an age-restricted competition in 2001, pulling them level with Vietnam for the number of gold medals won since 1959 (3 each)—trailing only Thailand (16), Malaysia (6), and Myanmar (5). Indonesia also became the fourth nation to win the gold with a perfect winning record, joining the ranks of Myanmar (1967, 1973), Malaysia (1989), and Thailand (1993, 2001, 2005, 2007, 2015).

For Thailand, the defeat marked the first time since 1991 that they failed to reach the top spot in three consecutive editions. Coupled with the women's team's fourth straight failure to secure gold, this Games was widely considered a disappointment for the region's football powerhouse. According to a survey by Kasem University, the U-22 team and Thai football in general were named the biggest disappointments of SEA Games 32. This final also marked the first time a Thai representative conceded five goals in a gold medal match, making it their heaviest-ever defeat in a SEA Games final. With 14 yellow cards and 9 red cards, the match entered the history books as the most penalized football game in SEA Games history.

Immediately after the victory, massive crowds of fans gathered in central Jakarta to celebrate. Supporters flooded the streets, waving national flags, chanting victory songs, and even lighting flares in a frenzied atmosphere. The euphoria continued on the morning of May 19, when the U-22 Indonesia team held a victory parade upon their return from Cambodia.

Tens of thousands of people swarmed the team bus, causing gridlock across major Jakarta thoroughfares for over two hours, particularly around the Ministry of Youth and Sports and the Gelora Bung Karno Stadium. While most were jubilant, some residents expressed frustration as the parade took place on a workday, causing significant disruptions to their schedules. Despite the minor controversy, the victory was hailed by President Joko Widodo, who extended his congratulations via his official Twitter account.

=== Controversies ===
"Omani referee Al-Hatmi faced significant backlash due to decisions and signals perceived as confusing. Indonesia's goal to make it 2–0 sparked heated debate over its validity. After a drop-ball, Rizky Ridho launched a long ball to Sananta. While the goal was upheld under Law 8 of the Laws of the Game (as the ball touched two Indonesian players before entering the net), defender Jonathan Khemdee and head coach Issara Sritaro accused Indonesia of a lack of fair play. They argued that since the referee had stopped play for an Indonesian injury while the ball was contested, possession should have been returned to Thailand. Furthermore, Khemdee criticized Al-Hatmi for losing control of the match, claiming his repeated errors frustrated both sides and triggered the brawl.

On the other side, Indonesia's head coach Indra Sjafri blamed the Thai bench and players for their provocative celebrations, which he said caused the chaos. Sjafri noted that after the fight broke out, he called his staff and players back to demand they refocus on the game. He also revealed that both teams met to apologize to one another after the final whistle.

Meanwhile, the Football Federation of Cambodia (FFC), the tournament organizer, declined to accept responsibility for the incident. In a separate development, Cambodia's Secretary of State for the Ministry of Information, Chum Kosal, demanded that Thailand discipline Jonathan Khemdee after he was seen approaching the stands and throwing his silver medal toward fans. Although Khemdee explained he intended to gift the medal to a close supporter, his actions drew ire from both Thai and Cambodian fans. This frustration was compounded by the Danish-born player’s prior announcement that he would retire from the national team after the final to focus on his club career."

"The incident garnered worldwide attention. The Spanish outlet Marca shared a video of the fight, labeling it 'the biggest mess of the year' and pointing to the referee’s confusing decisions as the catalyst. ESPN Asia asserted that Indonesia's gold medal was tarnished by the 'ugly clashes,' stating: 'Indonesia's victory feels incomplete. It is a pity that their glory—and the face of Southeast Asian football—was ultimately marred by disgraceful scenes rather than the beautiful performances expected of a compelling SEA Games final.'

The match also left a lasting impression on Southeast Asian fans, drawing mixed reactions. While some found the game more thrilling than a World Cup final, specifically the most recent edition at the time, others condemned the brawl. The violence on the pitch led many fans to mockingly compare the match to a UFC title fight or a martial arts showdown between Muay Thai and Pencak Silat.

=== Discipline actions and sanctions ===
The Football Association of Thailand (FAT) established an investigative committee to thoroughly examine the incident and announced that strict disciplinary measures would be taken against those involved in the brawl. Consequently, three members of the U-22 Thailand coaching staff were suspended from all national team duties for one year, while players Soponwit Rakyart and Teerapak Pruengna were handed six-month bans from representing the national team. Additionally, the Technical Director and Thailand's team manager, Yuttana Yimkarun, decided to tender his resignation following the incident. Meanwhile, the National Olympic Committee of Indonesia (NOC) urged the Football Association of Indonesia (PSSI) to report the matter to FIFA for coordinated action, while warning the U-22 squad to be prepared to take responsibility for their conduct.

The Asian Football Confederation (AFC) expressed deep disappointment over the brawl during the SEA Games 32 final, stating that such actions contradicted the spirit of fair play in football. Although no medals were stripped, the governing body imposed heavy fines and match bans on the players and staff involved. Three Indonesian players and four staff members were banned for six matches, while similar sanctions were handed to five officials and two players from the Thai side. Furthermore, the FAT was ordered to pay a $10,000 fine as a result of the chaotic altercation.
