= Kasidit Kalasin =

Thai footballer

Personal information
- Full name: Kasidit Kalasin
- Date of birth: 2 July 2004 (age 22)
- Place of birth: Chanthaburi, Thailand
- Height: 1.83 m (6 ft 0 in)
- Positions: Defensive midfielder; centre-back

Team information
- Current team: Nakhon Pathom United
- Number: 22

Youth career
- 2014–2019: Chonburi

Senior career*
| Years | Team | Apps | (Gls) |
| 2020– | Chonburi | 31 | (0) |
| 2020 | → Banbueng (loan) | 13 | (0) |
| 2021–2022 | → Uthai Thani (loan) | 20 | (0) |
| 2023 | → Samut Prakan City (loan) | 5 | (0) |
| 2025 | → Navy (loan) | 4 | (0) |
| 2026– | → Nakhon Pathom United (loan) | 13 | (1) |

International career
| 2022–2024 | Thailand U19 | 6 | (0) |
| 2023– | Thailand U23 | 5 | (0) |
- * Club domestic league appearances and goals as of 26 April 2025

Kasidit Kalasin (Thai: กษิดิศ กาฬสินธุ์, born 2 July 2004) is a Thai professional footballer who plays as a defensive midfielder or a centre-back for Thai League 2 club Nakhon Pathom United.

== Career ==
Kalasin, a product of Chonburi's academy, started his professional career in a loan move to Banbueng alongside other prospects such as Warakorn Thongbai and Jakkapong Sanmahung in 2020.

In 2021, he was sent on loan to Uthai Thani, where he played under head coach Therdsak Chaiman winning the 2021–22 Thai League 3 with the team.

He was recalled to Chonburi in the second leg of the 2022 season and made his club and Thai League 1 debut in August against BG Pathum coming on as a substitute, helping his team win 1-0.

In January 2023, Kalasin was sent out on loan to Samut Prakan City to compete in Thai League 2.

== International career ==
Kalasin played for Thailand U20 in the 2022 AFF U-19 Youth Championship and the 2023 AFC U-20 Asian Cup qualification.

== Honours ==
Uthai Thani

- Thai League 3 : 2021–22
- Thai League 3 Northern Region : 2021–22

Chonburi

- Thai League 2 : 2024–25
