= Santipap Ratniyorm =

Thai footballer (born 1992)

Personal information
- Full name: Santipap Ratniyorm
- Date of birth: 4 September 1992 (age 34)
- Place of birth: Bangkok, Thailand
- Height: 1.66 m (5 ft 5 1/2 in)
- Position: Midfielder

Team information
- Current team: Kanchanaburi Power

Youth career
- 2005–2009: JMG Academy
- 2010: Muangthong United

Senior career*
| Years | Team | Apps | (Gls) |
| 2010–2014 | Muangthong United | 0 | (0) |
| 2013 | → Samut Songkhram (loan) | 6 | (0) |
| 2014 | Samut Sakhon | | |
| 2015 | Thai Honda | | |
| 2016 | Phitsanulok | | |
| 2016 | Trat | | |
| 2017 | Samut Sakhon | | |
| 2017–2019 | Chainat | 42 | (2) |
| 2020–2021 | Ratchaburi Mitr Phol | 3 | (0) |
| 2020 | → Sukhothai (loan) | 13 | (0) |
| 2021–2022 | Suphanburi | 29 | (0) |
| 2022–2023 | Lamphun Warriors | 19 | (1) |
| 2023–2024 | Trat | 27 | (3) |
| 2024–2025 | Chonburi | 22 | (1) |
| 2025– | Kanchanaburi Power | 11 | (1) |
- * Club domestic league appearances and goals as of 26 April 2025

Santipap Ratniyorm (Thai: สันติภาพ ราษฎร์นิยม, born September 4, 1992) is a Thai professional footballer who plays as a midfielder for Thai League 1 club Kanchanaburi Power.

== Honours ==
=== Club ===
Muangthong United

- Thai League 1
  - Champions (1) : 2010
- Kor Royal Cup
  - Winners (1) : 2010

Chonburi

- Thai League 2
  - Champions (1) : 2024–25
