= 2018 Chonburi F.C. season =

Chonburi
2018 season
- Chairman: Wittaya Khunpluem
- Head coach: Jukkapant Punpee
- Stadium: Chonburi Stadium, Mueang Chonburi, Chonburi, Thailand
- Thai League: 9th
- Thai FA Cup: Quarter-finals
- Thai League Cup: Quarter-finals
- Top goalscorer: League: Worachit Kanitsribampen (12); All: Worachit Kanitsribampen (17)
- All statistics correct as of 21 October 2018.

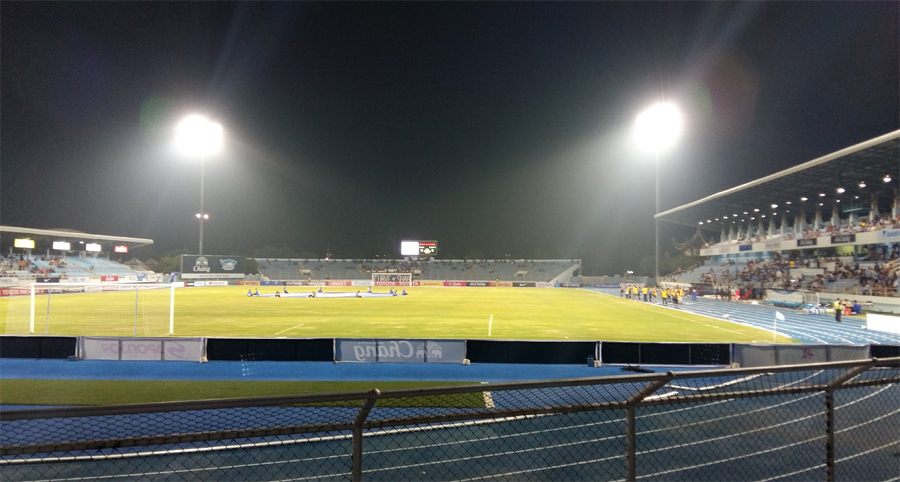

The 2018 season is Chonburi Football Club's 13th existence in the new era since they separated from Chonburi–Sannibat Samutprakan Football Club in 2006. It is the 3rd season in the Thai League and the club's 13th consecutive season in the top flight of the Thai football league system since separated in the 2006 season.

== League by seasons ==
Season	League	Position	Notes
2006	Thailand Premier League	8th	Began of the new era by competed as Chonburi F.C.
2007	Thailand Premier League	1st	
2008	Thailand Premier League	2nd	
2009	Thai Premier League	2nd	Thailand Premier League renamed to Thai Premier League
2010	Thai Premier League	3rd	
2011	Thai Premier League	2nd	
2012	Thai Premier League	2nd	
2013	Thai Premier League	3rd	
2014	Thai Premier League	2nd	
2015	Thai Premier League	4th	
2016	Thai League	5th	Thai Premier League renamed to Thai League
2017	Thai League	7th	
2018	Thai League	9th	

== Competitions ==
=== Thai League ===
Date	Opponents	H / A	Result F–A	Scorers	League position
10 February 2018	Chiangrai United	A	0–1		16th
16 February 2018	Navy	H	1–1	Settawut 74'	14th
24 February 2018	Sukhothai	H	1–2	Marclei 38'	15th
4 March 2018	Suphanburi	A	1–0	Kroekrit 54'	14th
10 March 2018	Bangkok Glass	H	0–2		15th
18 March 2018	Police Tero	A	1–0	Worachit 58'	12th
28 March 2018	Ratchaburi Mitr Phol	H	2–1	Roller 58' (o.g.), Worachit 60'	10th
31 March 2018	Buriram United	A	1–2	Kroekrit 53'	11th
8 April 2018	Chainat Hornbill	H	2–0	Kroekrit 34', Ciro 39'	11th
11 April 2018	Pattaya United	A	0–1		12th
21 April 2018	SCG Muangthong United	H	1–1	Worachit 53'	12th
25 April 2018	Air Force Central	A	2–1	Ciro 7', Worachit 40'	11th
29 April 2018	PT Prachuap	H	4–2	Nattapon 38', Ciro 53', Saharat 58', Settawut 78'	10th
6 May 2018	Bangkok United	A	1–2	Worachit 77'	11th
12 May 2018	Ubon UMT United	H	2–2	Phanuphong 69', Worachit 77'	9th
19 May 2018	Nakhon Ratchasima Mazda	A	1–0	Worachit 17'	8th
26 May 2018	Port	H	0–1		9th
10 June 2018	Navy	A	1–3	Marclei 43'	10th
16 June 2018	Sukhothai	A	2–1	Marclei 46', Ciro 87'	8th
23 June 2018	Suphanburi	H	2–0	Kroekrit 77', Nebihi 88'	8th
1 July 2018	Bangkok Glass	A	4–7	Worachit (2) 13', 48', Kroekrit 45+5', Matheus 78'	8th
8 July 2018	Police Tero	H	3–1	Matheus (2) 59', 88', Gyeong-min 74'	7th
14 July 2018	Ratchaburi Mitr Phol	A	1–1	Matheus 20'	7th
22 July 2018	Buriram United	H	0–2		8th
28 July 2018	Chainat Hornbill	A	0–0		8th
4 August 2018	Pattaya United	H	1–2	Napat 76'	10th
5 September 2018	SCG Muangthong United	A	1–4	Worachit 19'	10th
8 September 2018	Air Force Central	H	2–1	Nebihi 53', Ciro 85'	9th
12 September 2018	PT Prachuap	A	0–0		9th
16 September 2018	Bangkok United	H	2–4	Nebihi 50', Phanuphong 90+1'	9th
23 September 2018	Ubon UMT United	A	2–1	Kroekrit (2) 22', 56'	9th
29 September 2018	Nakhon Ratchasima Mazda	H	3–1	Kroekrit (2) 6', 64', Worachit 32'	7th
3 October 2018	Port	A	0–5		9th
7 October 2018	Chiangrai United	H	1–1	Worachit 63' (pen.)	9th

Pos	Team	Pld	W	D	L	GF	GA	GD	Pts
7	Nakhon Ratchasima	34	13	8	13	36	44	−8	47
8	Pattaya United	34	13	7	14	50	62	−12	46 (Note: Head-to-head record (Mini league): Pattaya United 10 pts, Chonburi 6 pts, Suphanburi 1 pt.)
9	Chonburi	34	13	7	14	45	53	−8	46
10	Suphanburi	34	11	13	10	43	35	+8	46
11	Sukhothai	34	12	7	15	53	63	−10	43 (Note: Sukhothai ahead on head-to-head record; Sukhothai 4 pts, Ratchaburi Mitr Phol 1 pt.)

Source: Thai League
Rules for classification: 1) Points; 2) Head-to-head points; 3) Head-to-head goals difference; 4) Head-to-head goals scored; 5) Overall goals difference; 6) Overall goals scored; 7) Fair play points; 8) Play-off without extra time;).

=== Thai FA Cup ===
Date	Opponents	H / A	Result F–A	Scorers	Round
27 June 2018	Pibulsongkram Rajabhat University	H	5–1	Worachit 20', Matheus (2) 27', 41', Kritsada (2) 38', 61'	Round of 64
4 July 2018	Uttaradit	H	7–0	Nebihi 7' (pen.), Worachit 17', Ciro 50', Settawut 71', Saharat (2) 74', 80', Nitithorn 87'	Round of 32
25 July 2018	Police Tero	H	4–1	Kroekrit 19', Phanuphong 27', Matheus 38', Nebihi 55'	Round of 16
1 August 2018	Ratchaburi Mitr Phol	A	0–1		Quarter-finals

=== Thai League Cup ===
Date	Opponents	H / A	Result F–A	Scorers	Round
13 June 2018	Khonkaen	A	2–1	Marclei 8', Kritsada 78'	Round of 32
11 July 2018	SCG Muangthong United	H	5–1	Matheus (3) 45', 57', 74', Saharat 59', Nebihi 89'	Round of 16
8 August 2018	Bangkok Glass	H	4–6 (a.e.t.)	Worachit (3) 6', 10', 85' (pen.), Ciro 73'	Quarter-finals
