= Nitipong Sanmahung =

Thai footballer (born 1996)

Netipong Sanmahung
Personal information
- Full name: Netipong Sanmahung
- Date of birth: 4 March 1996 (age 30)
- Place of birth: Sakon Nakhon, Thailand
- Height: 1.87 m (6 ft 1 1/2 in)
- Position: Centre-back

Team information
- Current team: Kasetsart
- Number: 15

Youth career
- 2012–2017: Air Force Central

Senior career*
Years	Team	Apps	(Gls)
2017–2018	Air Force Central	16	(0)
2019	Udon Thani	7	(0)
2019	→ Chiangmai (loan)	7	(0)
2020–2021	Chainat Hornbill	15	(0)
2022	Pattaya Dolphins United	15	(2)
2022–2024	Uthai Thani	41	(6)
2024	→ Nakhon Si United (loan)	5	(0)
2024–2025	Chonburi	15	(0)
2025–2026	Khon Kaen United	14	(2)
2026–	Kasetsart	0	(0)

International career
2015	Thailand U19	9	(1)
2017	Thailand U21	2	(0)
2017–2019	Thailand U23	5	(0)
- * Club domestic league appearances and goals as of 26 April 2025

Netipong Sanmahung (Thai: เนติพงษ์ แสนมะฮุง; born 4 March 1996) is a Thai professional footballer who plays as a centre-back for Thai League 2 club Kasetsart.

== International career ==
In 2018 he was part of the 2018 AFC U-23 Championship with Thailand U23.

== Personal life ==
Netipong's brother, Jakkapong Sanmahung, is also a footballer.

== Honours ==
=== Club ===
Chonburi

- Thai League 2 : 2024–25
