= Suksan Bunta =

Thai footballer

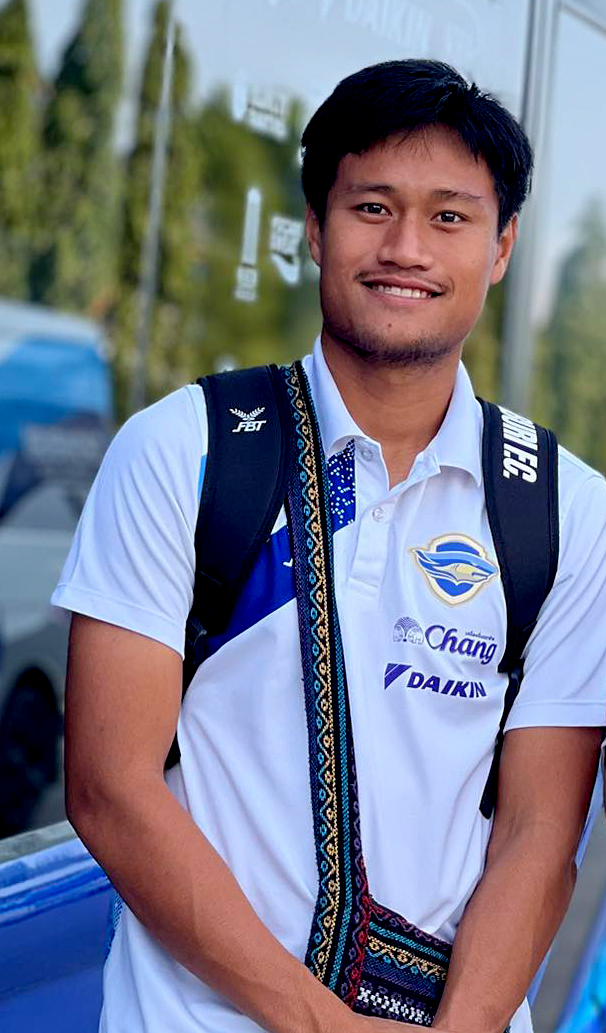
- Bunta in 2025

Personal information
- Full name: Suksan Bunta
- Date of birth: 5 March 2002 (age 24)
- Place of birth: Thailand
- Height: 1.70 m (5 ft 7 in)
- Position: Right back

Team information
- Current team: Ayutthaya PK
- Number: 45

Youth career
- 2012–2016: Assumption College Sriracha
- 2017–2021: Chonburi

Senior career*
Years	Team	Apps	(Gls)
2021–	Chonburi	35	(2)
2021–2022	→ Pattaya Dolphins United (loan)	23	(8)
2024	→ Police Tero (loan)	11	(0)
2026–	→ Ayutthaya PK (loan)	0	(0)

International career
2023	Thailand U23	1	(0)
- * Club domestic league appearances and goals as of 26 April 2025

Suksan Bunta (Thai: สุขสันต์ บุญตา, born 5 May 2002) is a Thai professional footballer who plays as a Right back for Thai League 3 club Ayutthaya PK .

== Career ==
On 20 August 2022, Suksan made his Thai League 1 debut for Chonburi against Police Tero and scored his first goal for Chonburi, helping his team win 2–0. On 2 October 2022, Suksan tore his right PCL while playing in the Thai League 1 against Nongbua Pitchaya, sidelining him for months.

== Honours ==
=== Club ===
Chonburi

- Thai League 2 : 2024–25
