= 2011 Kor Royal Cup =

Chonburi	Muangthong United
2	1
- Date: 30 January 2011
- Venue: Suphachalasai Stadium, Bangkok
- Referee: Apisit Aonrak

The 2011 Kor Royal Cup was the 76th Kor Royal Cup, an annual football match contested by the winners of the previous season's Thai Premier League and Thai FA Cup competitions. The match was played at Suphachalasai Stadium, Bangkok, on 30 January 2011, and contested by 2010 Thai Premier League champions Muangthong United, and Chonburi as the winners of the 2010 Thai FA Cup.

MATCH RULES

- 90 minutes.
- Penalty shoot-out if necessary.
- Maximum of three substitutions.

== See also ==
- 2011 Thai Premier League
- 2011 Thai FA Cup
