= Lee Chan-dong =

South Korean footballer

Personal information
- Date of birth: 10 January 1993 (age 33)
- Place of birth: Eumseong, South Korea
- Height: 1.83 m (6 ft 0 in)
- Position: Defensive midfielder

Team information
- Current team: Gyeongnam
- Number: 8

Youth career
- 2008–2010: Cheongju Daeseong High School
- 2011–2013: Incheon University

Senior career*
Years	Team	Apps	(Gls)
2014–2016	Gwangju FC	88	(1)
2017–2020	Jeju United	50	(3)
2019–2020	→ Sangju Sangmu (army)	12	(0)
2021–2023	Gwangju FC	23	(2)
2023–2024	Chonburi	20	(0)
2024–2025	Daegu	20	(0)
2025–	Gyeongnam	29	(1)

International career^{‡}
2015–2016	South Korea U-23	13	(1)
2015–	South Korea	2	(0)
- * Club domestic league appearances and goals as of 6 August 2026 ‡ National team caps and goals as of 3 February 2018

- Lee Chan-dong
- Hangul: 이찬동
- Hanja: 李燦東
- RR: I Chandong
- MR: I Ch'andong

Lee Chan-dong (Korean: 이찬동; born 10 January 1993) is a South Korean footballer who plays as a defensive midfielder for Gyeongnam.

== Career ==
He was selected by Gwangju FC in the 2014 K League draft.

=== International ===
Lee was part of the senior South Korea squad for the 2015 EAFF East Asian Cup.

== Club statistics ==
As of match played 1 December 2024

Appearances and goals by club, season and competition
Club	Season	League			Cup		League Cup		Continental		Other		Total	
Club	Season	Division	Apps	Goals	Apps	Goals	Apps	Goals	Apps	Goals	Apps	Goals	Apps	Goals
Gwangju FC	2014	K League 2	33	1	3	0	—		—		2	0	38	1
Gwangju FC	2015	K League 1	30	0	1	0	—		—		—		31	0
Gwangju FC	2016	K League 1	25	0	0	0	—		—		—		25	0
Gwangju FC	Total		173	6	12	0	—		—		2	0	198	6
Jeju United	2017	K League 1	28	2	1	0	—		6	0	—		35	2
Jeju United	2018	K League 1	18	1	2	0	—		5	0	—		25	1
Jeju United	2020	K League 1	8	0	0	0	—		—		—		8	0
Jeju United	Total		54	3	3	0	—		11	0	—		68	3
Sangju Sangmu (army)	2019	K League 1	4	0	2	0	—		—		—		6	0
Sangju Sangmu (army)	2020	K League 2	4	0	1	0	—		—		—		5	0
Sangju Sangmu (army)	Total		8	0	3	0	—		—		—		11	0
Gwangju FC	2021	K League 1	21	2	0	0	—		—		—		21	2
Gwangju FC	2022	K League 1	2	0	2	0	—		—		—		4	0
Gwangju FC	Total		23	2	2	0	—		—		—		25	2
Chonburi	2023–24	Thai League 1	20	0	3	0	0	0	—		—		23	0
Daegu FC	2024	K League 1	8	0	—		—		—		2	1	10	1
Career total			201	6	15	0	0	0	11	0	4	1	231	7

== Honours ==
South Korea

- EAFF East Asian Cup: 2015
