= Amadou Ouattara =

Ivorian footballer

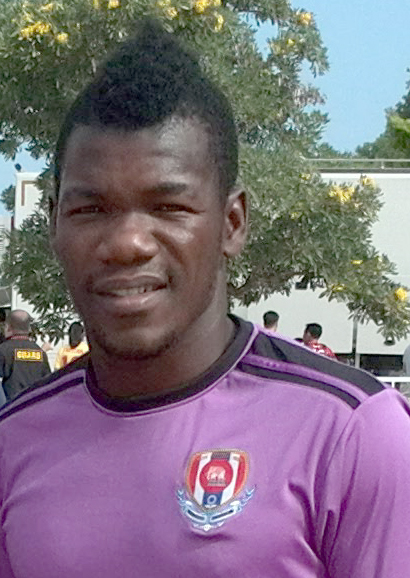
- Ouattara with Navy in 2018

Personal information
- Full name: Amadou Ouattara
- Date of birth: 30 December 1990 (age 35)
- Place of birth: Oumé, Ivory Coast
- Height: 1.70 m (5 ft 7 in)
- Position: Winger

Team information
- Current team: Khon Kaen United
- Number: 81

Senior career*
Years	Team	Apps	(Gls)
2009–2010	Moss	3	(0)
2011–2017	PTT Rayong	56	(11)
2018	Navy	33	(13)
2019–2022	Nakhon Ratchasima	85	(12)
2022–2025	Chonburi	78	(19)
2025–	Khon Kaen United	0	(0)
- * Club domestic league appearances and goals as of 26 April 2025

Amadou Ouattara (born 30 December 1990) is an Ivorian professional footballer who plays as a winger for Thai League 2 club Khon Kaen United.

== Honours ==
=== Club ===
Chonburi

- Thai League 2 : 2024–25
