= Rachata Moraksa =

Thai footballer (born 2000)

Personal information
- Full name: Rachata Moraksa
- Date of birth: 21 February 2000 (age 26)
- Place of birth: Samut Prakan, Thailand
- Height: 1.68 m (5 ft 6 in)
- Position: Defensive midfielder

Team information
- Current team: Chonburi
- Number: 32

Youth career
- 2014–2017: Chonburi

Senior career*
Years	Team	Apps	(Gls)
2018–	Chonburi	31	(0)
2019–2020	→ Banbueng (loan)	7	(0)
2020	→ Udon United (loan)	5	(0)
2022–2023	→ Samut Prakan City (loan)	33	(0)
2024	→ Police Tero (loan)	9	(0)
- * Club domestic league appearances and goals as of 26 April 2025

Rachata Moraksa (Thai: รชต หมอรักษา, born 21 February 2000) is a Thai professional footballer who plays as a defensive midfielder.

== Honours ==
=== Club ===
Chonburi

- Thai League 2 : 2024–25
