= Songchai Thongcham =

Thai footballer (born 2001)

Personal information
- Full name: Songchai Thongcham
- Date of birth: 9 June 2001 (age 25)
- Place of birth: Chonburi, Thailand
- Height: 1.83 m (6 ft 0 in)
- Position: Centre back

Team information
- Current team: Nongbua Pitchaya
- Number: 23

Youth career
- 2013–2020: Chonburi

Senior career*
Years	Team	Apps	(Gls)
2020–2026	Chonburi	98	(0)
2020	→ Banbueng (loan)	0	(0)
2026	→ Police Tero (loan)	16	(0)
2026–	Nongbua Pitchaya	0	(0)

International career^{‡}
2018–2023	Thailand U23	11	(0)
- * Club domestic league appearances and goals as of 18 May 2026 ‡ National team caps and goals as of 10 November 2019

Songchai Thongcham (Thai: ทรงชัย ทองฉ่ำ, born 9 June 2001) is a Thai professional footballer who plays as a centre back for Thai League 2 club Nongbua Pitchaya.

== Career ==
Songchai learned to play football in the youth team of Chonburi FC. The club from Chonburi played in the country's highest league, the Thai League 1. It was here that he signed his first professional contract on 1 July 2020. The central defender made his debut in the first division on 20 September 2020 in the away game against PT Prachuap Here he was in the starting line-up and played the full ninety minutes.

== Honours ==
Chonburi

- Thai League 2: 2024–25
- Thai FA Cup : Runner-up 2020–21

=== International ===
Thailand U23

- SEA Games (silver) Silver medal: 2023

Individual

- AFF U-23 Championship Team of the Tournament: 2023
