= Assumption College Sriracha =

- โรงเรียนอัสสัมชัญศรีราชา

Location
- Chonburi; Thailand
- Coordinates: 13°9′52″N 100°56′27″E

Information
- Type: Private Roman Catholic Non-profit Co-educational Basic (Primary and Secondary) education institution
- Motto: Labor Omnia Vincit Latin) (Work conquers all)
- Religious affiliations: Roman Catholic (Gabrielite Brothers)
- Established: 1944; 82 years ago
- Founder: Montfort Brothers of St. Gabriel
- Language: Languages taught: Thai; English; French; Japanese; Mandarin Chinese
- Colors: Red and white
- Website: www.acs.ac.th

Assumption College Sriracha (ACS) is a private, Catholic-run school on the Eastern Seaboard of Thailand, in Si Racha District, Chonburi Province. The campus covers 120 acres (0.49 km^{2}), and has play spaces, football pitches, a swimming pool, and a sports stadium.

Founded in 1944, it educates 4,200 children, mainly boys, from Kindergarten to Mathayom 6 (Grade 12). Former Thai prime ministers and other leading figures have been educated at Assumption colleges and universities.

In 1994, the Ministry of Education certified ACS as an "Excellent Educational Institution", recognising the school's achievements in academic studies. Assumption College Sriracha runs several English-language programmes and employs native-speaking English teachers.

ACS is one of 14 institutions run by the St. Gabriel Foundation in Thailand, which was established in 1944. During the Second World War, Assumption College in Bangkok was damaged by bombing. The school had to close temporarily, and in November 1942 the college moved to Sriracha to occupy a new, temporary, school. At the time, the location was a wild lemongrass and pineapple farm. After the war, Assumption College reopened in Bangkok, but hostels for students were damaged and so some pupils remained in Sriracha.

The school is about 100 kilometres from Bangkok and close to the popular tourist resorts of Pattaya and Jomtien.

== Boarders ==
Assumption College Sriracha was formerly a boarding school only, but today there are both boarding students and day students. Some students board full-time during the semester while other board on a weekly basis and return home on weekends.
