= Channarong Promsrikaew =

Thai footballer (born 2001)

Personal information
- Full name: Channarong Promsrikaew
- Date of birth: 17 April 2001 (age 25)
- Place of birth: Yasothon, Thailand
- Height: 1.74 m (5 ft 9 in)
- Positions: Attacking midfielder; winger

Team information
- Current team: Chonburi
- Number: 10

Youth career
- 2012–2017: Muangthong United
- 2017–2018: Chonburi

Senior career*
Years	Team	Apps	(Gls)
2018–	Chonburi	130	(14)
2020	→ Banbueng (loan)	1	(0)
2021–2022	→ Unión Adarve (loan)	14	(1)

International career^{‡}
2017–2018	Thailand U17	4	(5)
2020–2021	Thailand U19	13	(3)
2022–2023	Thailand U23	18	(1)
2022–	Thailand	18	(1)
Medal record
Thailand
Asean Football Championship
Winner	AFF Mitsubishi Electric Cup 2022	2022
- * Club domestic league appearances and goals as of 26 April 2025 ‡ National team caps and goals as of 4 June 2025

Channarong Promsrikaew (Thai: ชาญณรงค์ พรมศรีแก้ว, born 17 April 2001) is a Thai professional footballer who plays as an attacking midfielder or a winger for Chonburi and the Thailand national team.

== International career ==
In 2018, Channarong played four games for the Thailand U17 and scored five goals. The following year he scored three goals in eleven games for the Thailand U19. He has been active for his country's Thailand U23 since March 2022, He has played thirteen games here so far. He made his Thailand senior national team debut on 25 September 2022 in a friendly match against Trinidad and Tobago. In December 2022 to January 2023 he played in the Asean Football Championship and won the two finals against Vietnam with a total of 3-2.

== Career statistics ==
As of match played 20 April 2024.

Appearances and goals by club, season and competition
Club	Season	League			National cup		League cup		Continental		Other		Total	
Club	Season	Division	Apps	Goals	Apps	Goals	Apps	Goals	Apps	Goals	Apps	Goals	Apps	Goals
Chonburi	2017	Thai League 1	4	0	0	0	0	0	—		—		4	0
Chonburi	2018	Thai League 1	3	0	0	0	0	0	0	0	0	0	3	0
Chonburi	2020–21	Thai League 1	20	1	6	0	0	0	0	0	0	0	26	1
Chonburi	2022–23	Thai League 1	25	3	1	0	1	0	0	0	0	0	27	3
Chonburi	2023–24	Thai League 1	25	5	0	0	0	0	0	0	0	0	25	5
Chonburi	Total		77	9	7	0	1	0	0	0	0	0	85	9
Unión Adarve (loan)	2021–22	Segunda Federación	14	1	0	0	—		—		—		14	1
Career total			91	10	7	0	1	0	0	0	0	0	99	10

=== International ===
As of match played 4 June 2025

Appearances and goals by national team and year
National team	Year	Apps	Goals
Thailand	2022	6	1
Thailand	2023	6	0
Thailand	2024	4	0
Thailand	2025	2	0
Total		18	1

=== International goals ===
==== Senior ====
#	Date	Venue	Opponent	Score	Result	Competition
1.	25 September 2022	700th Anniversary Stadium, Chiang Mai, Thailand	Trinidad and Tobago	1–0	2–1	2022 King's Cup

== Personal life ==
Channarong is a practicing Christian.

== Honours ==
=== Club ===
Chonburi FC

- Thai League 2 : 2024–25
- Thai FA Cup : Runner-up 2020–21

=== International ===
Thailand

- AFF Championship: 2022
- King's Cup: 2024

Thailand U23

- SEA Games (silver) Silver medal: 2023

=== Individual ===
- Thai League 1 Goal of the Month: September 2022, March 2023
- Thai League 2 Most Valuable Player: 2024–25
