= Chonburi F.C. =

Thai football club

Chonburi ชลบุรี เอฟซี
- Full name: Chonburi Football Club สโมสรฟุตบอลจังหวัดชลบุรี
- Nicknames: The Sharks (ฉลามชล)
- Short name: CHO
- Founded: 1996; 30 years ago, as Chonburi-Sannibat Samut Prakan; 2000; 26 years ago, as Chonburi
- Ground: Chonburi Stadium; Mueang Chonburi, Chonburi, Thailand
- Capacity: 8,680
- Chairman: Wittaya Khunpluem
- Coach: Therdsak Chaiman
- League: Thai League 1
- 2025-26: Thai League 1, 8th of 16
- Website: www.chonburifootballclub.com
Home colours	Away colours

Chonburi Football Club (Thai: สโมสรฟุตบอลจังหวัดชลบุรี) is a Thai professional football club based in the city of Chonburi, Chonburi province, that competes in the first division in Thai football, Thai League 1, after promotion in the 2024–25 season. The team lifted the league title in 2007 which became the most successful season in their history.

Chonburi were founded in 1997. Their main rivals were Sriracha, who were also based in Chonburi Province prior to their move and subsequent dissolution. The team is widely known by the nickname "The Sharks", which can be seen in the crest of the club.

The club has won one Thai League 1 title, one Thai League 2 title, two Thai FA Cups, one Thai League Cup and four Kor Royal Cups.

== History ==
=== Early years (1996–2000) ===
In its early years, Chonburii-Sannibat Samut Prakan Football Club was Assumption College Sriracha's football team. The team was managed by Annop Singtothong, Thanasak Suraprasert, Sontaya Khunpluem, and Wittaya Khunpluem. The team competed and were victorious in many youth tournaments, including the Institute of Physical Education's youth football tournament.

In 1996, Sannibat Samut Prakan Association competed in the Khǒr Royal Cup and came in second place. The directors of the football team negotiated for a merger, which resulted in the creation of Chonburi-Sannibat Samut Prakan. The team then competed in Thai Division 1 League, today known as Thai League 2.

==== Provincial league ====
The Chonburi Sports Association had the chance to compete in the Provincial League in 2000. As a result, Chonburi's provincial football team was separated from Chonburi-Sannibat Samut Prakan, thus renaming themselves Chonburi Football Club, which competed in Thai Division 1 League. The team that competed in the Provincial League acquired their players from Assumption College Sriracha and Chulabhon's College Chonburi. They ended their first season in the Provincial League in third place.

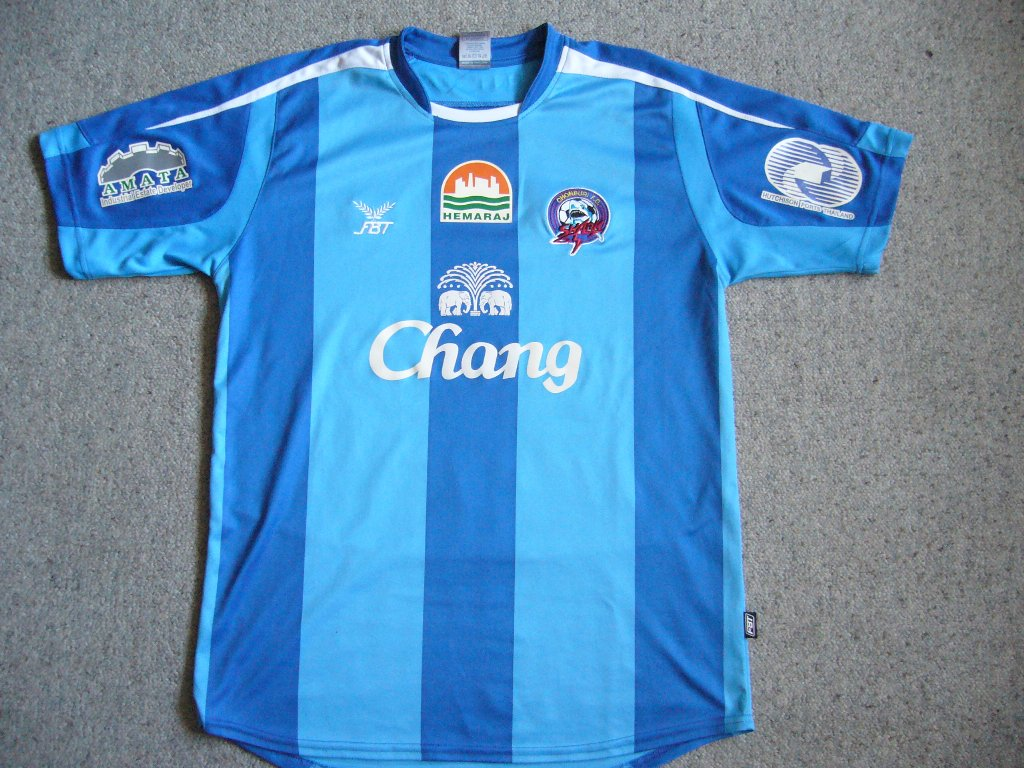
Chonburi home kit in 2008 with old logo

In 2005, Chonburi won the Provincial League title by beating Nakhon Ratchasima at the Nakhon Ratchasima Municipal Stadium, and gained promotion to the 2006 Thailand Premier League with the Provincial League runners up, Suphanburi. This title was the first major success of the club.

In 2006, Chonburi were invited by Football Association of Singapore (FAS) to play in the 2006 Singapore Cup and reached the cup final, defeating local sides Home United, Albirex Niigata (S) and Balestier Khalsa along the way. In the final, they lost 2–3 to Tampines Rovers in extra time after leading 2–0. Chonburi then finished 8th in the 2006 Thai Premier League season.

=== First major success (2007–2014) ===
==== Top flight league title ====
In 2007, Chonburi were again invited to participate in the 2007 Singapore Cup, but were defeated in the first round against Balestier Khalsa, in a replay of the previous season's semi-finals, where Chonburi lost 3–2. Chonburi went on to win the 2007 Kor Royal Cup. Coming to the end of this season, Chonburi became Thailand Premier League champions for the 2007 season. This was the first trophy in major league for the club. Head coach Jadet Meelarp won the 'Coach of the Year' award and Pipob On-Mo got 'Player of the Year' award. The club qualified to the 2008 AFC Champions League after winning the league.

In July 2008, the previous sponsor, Hemaraj Land and Development PLC signed a major sponsorship deal which would come into effect from 2009. The contract would run for three years and would amount to the sum of 18 million baht (about 350,000 Euros). This may be the largest completed sponsorship of a Thai football club which was ever completed.

At the end of the 2008 season, there was only enough for runner-up. The main reason for this was certainly the profligacy. With two games left in the season you still on the first place in the table, but a 0–0 draw against Samut Songkhram made to naught in the penultimate round of the dream title defense. Jadet Meelarp was dismissed. His successor was officially announced in mid-December 2008. Kiatisuk Senamuang was appointed the head coach of Chonburi.

==== AFC Champions League debut ====
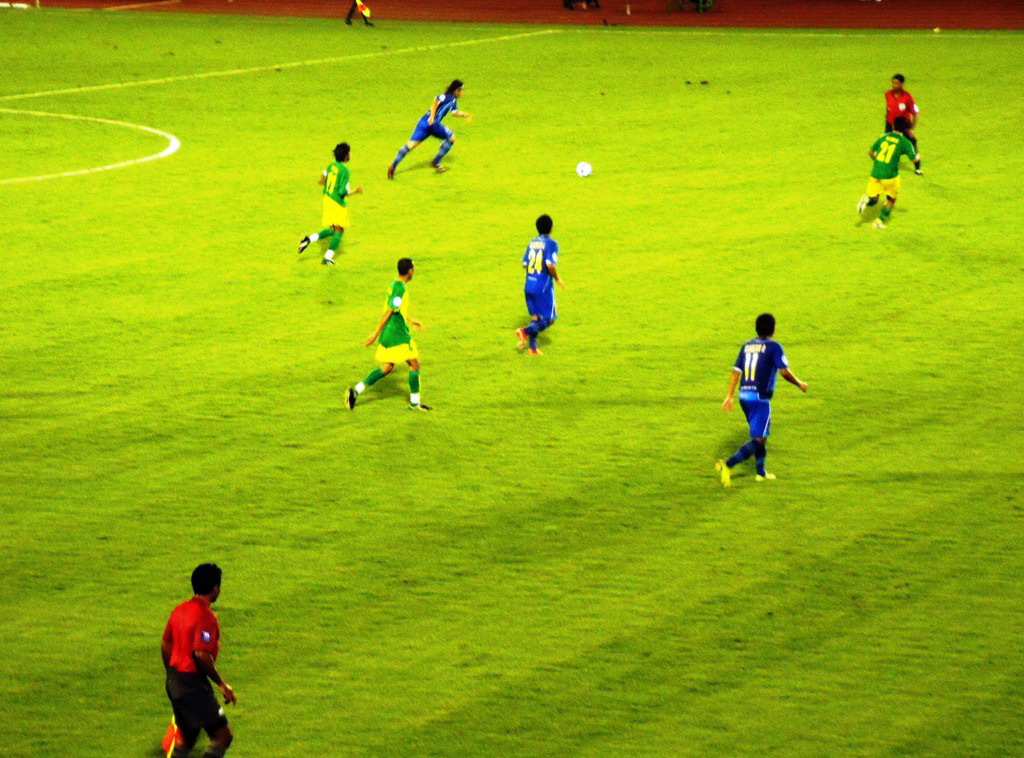
Chonburi playing against Malaysian club Kedah FA in the 2009 AFC Cup

In 2008, Chonburi made their debut in the 2008 AFC Champions League season being drawn in group G alongside Japanese club Gamba Osaka, Australian club Melbourne Victory and Korean club Chunnam Dragons. Chonburi played their first game against Gamba Osaka on 12 March, where the team was seconds away from their first ever win in their debut match in the tournament, but opponent Lucas Severino scored the equaliser for the opponent, equalising it at 1–1, which saw Chonburi register their first point in the tournament. On 20 March, the club achieved its first victory in the AFC Champions League against Melbourne Victory. The game was clouded by controversy when Melbourne Victory scored their only goal whilst a Chonburi player was down injured and his teammates were calling for the ball to be played off the park. It mattered little when Cameroonian striker Jules Baga scored a goal from 35 yards out and then followed it up with a second goal in extra time to condemn Melbourne Victory to their first loss in the competition 3–1. Chonburi finished the campaign with 5 points, finishing at the bottom of the group stage, thus knocking out from the tournament. Chonburi finished as the league runners-up in 2008 thus seeing the club qualified for the 2009 AFC Cup.

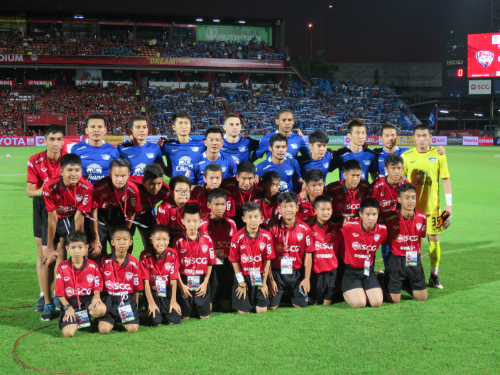
Chonburi squad in 2016

In the 2009 season, Chonburi played in the 2009 AFC Cup and was drawn in group G alongside Vietnamese club Hanoi ACB, Hong Kong club Eastern and Malaysian club Kedah FA. Chonburi had five wins and only lost one game, which was against Eastern at the Mong Kok Stadium on 5 May 2009. The club qualified to the round of 16 facing off against Indonesian club PSMS Medan which Chonburi thrash them 4–1 and qualifying to the quarter-finals where they would face Vietnamese club Bình Dương. However Chonburi suffered a 4–2 lost on aggregate thus knocking out from the tournament. The game against Medan was also the last game of star player Surat Sukha, who moved to Australia to signed with Melbourne Victory. Chonburi finished the 2009 season being league runner-up again, where they won the 2009 Kor Royal Cup.

==== Thai FA Cup champions ====
In the 2010 season, Chonburi finished the season in third place in the league in which the club went on to advanced all the way to the 2010 Thai FA Cup final facing off against Muangthong United on 28 November. The match were levelled at 1–1 bringing the game to extra time where Pipob On-Mo scored in the dying minute of the match in the 120th minute to bring the match to 2–1 thus helping Chonburi to win the 2010 Thai FA Cup.

In the 2011 season, Chonburi played in the 2011 AFC Cup as the Thai FA Cup champions which see the club drawn in group H alongside Indonesian club Persipura Jayapura, Indian club East Bengal and Hong Kong club South China. Chonburi managed it with 4 wins, 1 draw and 1 lost thus qualifying to the round of 16 as group leaders. In the round of 16, they faced off against another Indonesian club Sriwijaya where Chonburi won 3–0 and qualifying to the quarter-final meeting against Uzbekistan club Nasaf Qarshi. As both team were on a 1–1 aggregate over two leg, the game went on to penalties shootout in the second leg at the Markaziy Stadium in which the opponent went on to win 4–3 on penalties thus seeing Chonburi knocked out from the tournament. Chonburi finished as league runners-up again in 2011, and also won the 2011 Kor Royal Cup.

Chonburi started off the 2012 season playing in the 2012 AFC Champions League qualifying play-off against Korean club Pohang Steelers but lost 2–0 thus being place in the 2012 AFC Cup group stage instead. They were then drawn in group G alongside Myanmar club Yangon United, Singaporean club Home United and Hong Kong club Citizen. Chonburi managed to pick up four wins and two draws finishing at group leaders and seeing themselves advanced to the round of 16, where they would face Iraqi club Al Zawraa. Pipob On-Mo scored the only goal in the match helping Chonburi with the win to advanced to the quarter-finals facing off against Syrian club Al Shorta. Chonburi managed to pick up a 5–4 on aggregate over two legs, qualifying to the semi-finals. However, Chonburi's hopes of being in the final were crushed after they lost 8–2 on aggregate to Iraqi club Arbil. Chonburi finished off the 2012 season as league runners-up and also won the 2012 Kor Royal Cup.

==== Relegation and second division champions ====
In the 2023–24 season, Chonburi finished in 14th place by sitting in the relegation zone 2 points away from escaping relegation. The club was relegated to the Thai League 2 ending a 19-year tenure in the top-flight. Chonburi played in the Thai League 2 ahead of the 2024–25 season, and became Thai League 2 champions, gaining promotion back to the top flight after spending a season in the second division.

== Team image ==
=== Video games ===
In August 2013, Top Eleven, a popular football management simulation developed by Nordeus, introduced official club items for Chonburi to its in-game club shop. These items included the club’s official logo and home and away jerseys, allowing Top Eleven managers to purchase and represent the Thai club within the game’s virtual environment.

== Kit suppliers and shirt sponsors ==
Period	Kit manufacturer	Main sponsor
2005–2008	(Thailand) FBT	No sponsors
2009–2011	(Thailand) FBT	(Thailand) Chang
2012–2023	(United States) Nike	(Thailand) Chang
2023–2024	In house production	(Thailand) Chang
2024–present	(Thailand) FBT	(Thailand) Chang

== Academy development ==
Chonburi is well known for producing football talent as well as using their youth players in the first team. In the 2007 Thailand Premier League in which they have been crowned champions, over 80% of their first-team players came from their youth program. However, in the past, their youth players stayed at boarding schools in Chonburi province such as Assumption College Sriracha and Chulabhon's College Chonburi.

Today, Chonburi has a football academy where academy players train and live every day at. The idea of creating a football academy was spearheaded by former Chonburi head coach and current technical director Witthaya Laohakul, who stressed the importance of creating and producing quality football players for the first team. In 2009, Chonburi decided to remodel its academy and youth program by building an actual football academy in Ban Bueng District. The new academy is located far away from Chonburi surrounded by paddy fields and was once rented out to JMG Academy. This new football academy includes a dormitory and football training facilities for the academy players.

Chonburi recruits academy players by scouting them from tournaments as well as offering trials. Worachit Kanitsribampen is one of the first successful players to come out of Chonburi's newly restructured academy. As of 2025, Chonburi Academy are one of only four academies in Southeast Asia to be conferred a Two-Star academy status alongside Johor Darul Ta'zim Academy, NFDP Mokhtar Dahari Academy in Malaysia and Lion City Sailors Academy in Singapore.

== Stadium ==
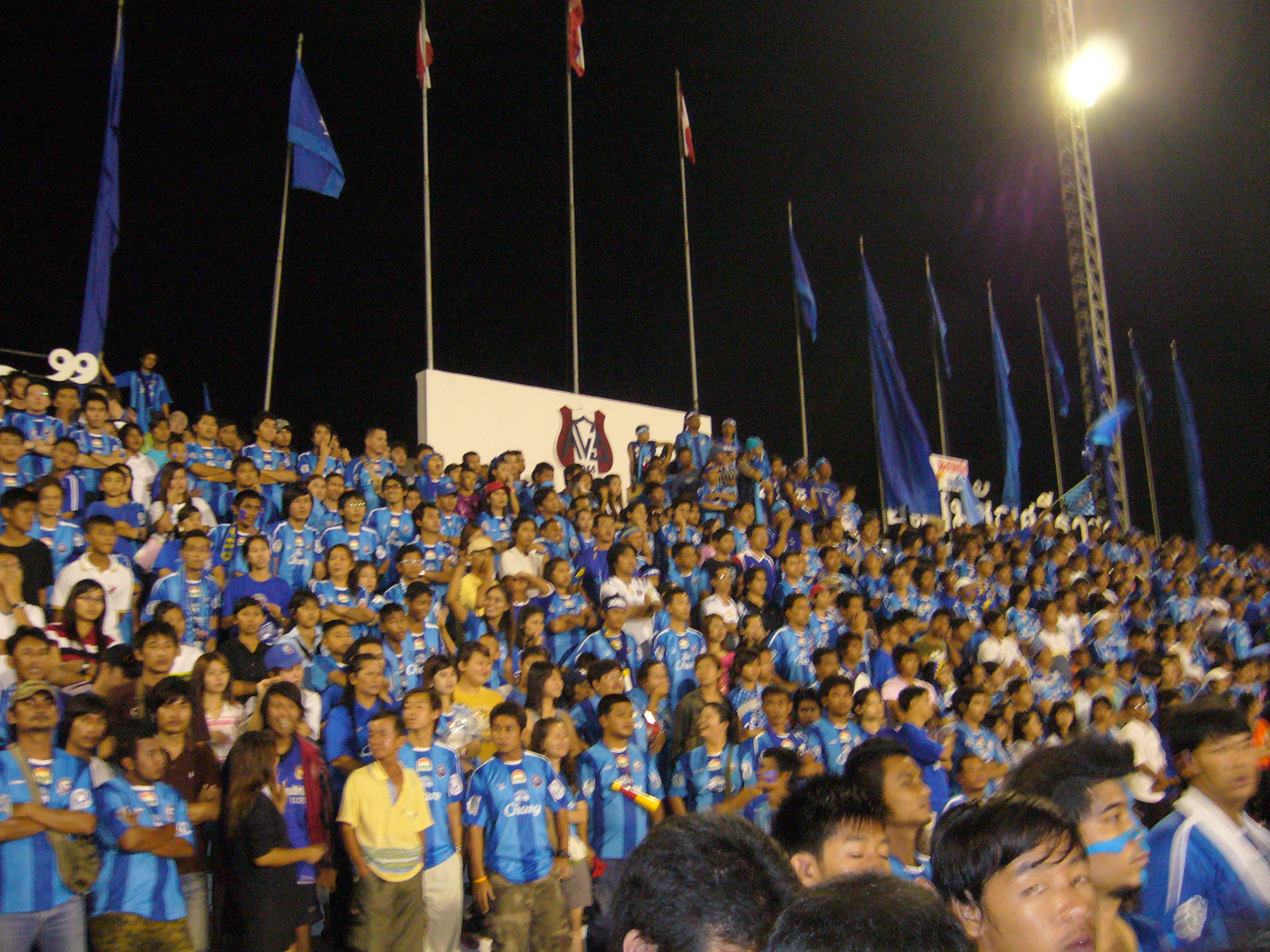
Supporters at Chonburi Stadium in 2008

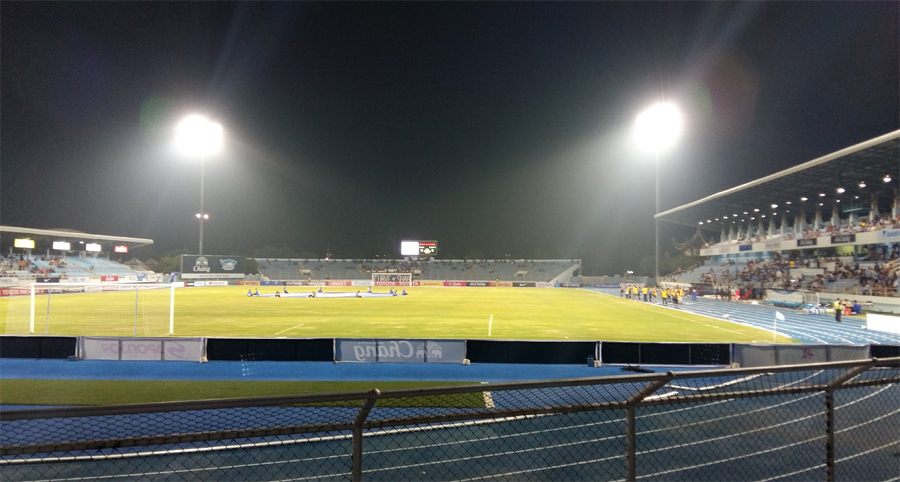
Chonburi Stadium in 2018

At the start of the 2007 season, Chonburi used the Chonburi Municipality Stadium as their home ground which can hold up to 5,000 capacity. Due to disagreements with the local authorities, the club played its home games at the Princess Sirindhorn Stadium in 2009 before moving their home ground again with IPE Chonburi Stadium as their home ground in 2010.

With Chonburi winning the league title in 2008 which sees them qualified to the 2008 AFC Champions League, Chonburi played their home ground at the National Stadium which reach FIFA stadium requirements standard to host an AFC tournament. The club also used the stadium for their home games in the 2009 AFC Cup.

=== Permanent home ground ===
In the 2011 season, Chonburi move to Chonburi Stadium after the stadium was completely build and reach the FIFA requirements to host their home games in the AFC Cup thus becoming a permanent home ground for the club. The stadium can hold up to 8,000 capacity.

In 2019, Chonburi used the Sattahip Navy Stadium as a temporary venue while the Chonburi Stadium is being renovated.

=== Stadium and locations ===
Coordinates	Location	Stadium	Capacity	Year
13°21′52″N 100°58′35″E	Chonburi	Chonburi Municipality Stadium	8,680	2007–2008
13°09′49″N 100°56′25″E	Chonburi	Princess Sirindhorn Stadium	8,000	2009
13°24′41″N 100°59′37″E	Chonburi	IPE Chonburi Stadium	11,000	2010
13°20′11″N 100°57′23″E	Chonburi	Chonburi Stadium	8,680	2011–present
12°39′50″N 100°56′09″E	Chonburi	Sattahip Navy Stadium	6,000	2019

== Affiliated clubs ==
- (England) Manchester City (2007)

Chonburi have maintained partnerships with Manchester City for player development and technical cooperation, following the takeover of the Premier League club by former Thailand Prime Minister, Thaksin Shinawatra. During this period, youth and reserve players were loaned to Chonburi and coaching expertise was shared, contributing to the club’s professional development and their first Thai Premier League title in 2007.

- (Japan) Vissel Kobe (2012)

Chonburi announced a business partnership between Vissel Kobe of the J1 League in 2012. The deal will facilitate player and staff exchanges both at the professional and youth level, as well as friendly matches, the creation of new football schools, and marketing opportunities.

== Players ==
=== Current squad ===
Note: Flags indicate national team as defined under FIFA eligibility rules; some limited exceptions apply. Players may hold more than one non-FIFA nationality.

No.	Pos.	Nation	Player
1	GK	PHI	Kevin Ray Mendoza
2	DF	PHI	Kike Linares
3	DF	THA	Peerapat Notchaiya
5	DF	THA	Nattapong Sayriya
6	MF	BRA	Wellington Priori
7	MF	THA	Channarong Promsrikaew
8	FW	THA	Yotsakorn Burapha
9	FW	BRA	Dennis Murillo
10	MF	BRA	Negueba
11	FW	THA	Korawich Tasa
14	MF	THA	Chaowat Veerachat
15	MF	THA	Saharat Sontisawat
17	FW	JPN	Tomoyuki Doi
18	FW	BRA	Stênio Júnior
19	DF	THA	Tristan Do

No.	Pos.	Nation	Player
23	DF	THA	Santiphap Channgom
30	MF	BRA	Bruno Andrade
31	FW	THA	Sittichok Paso
32	DF	THA	Rachata Moraksa
36	DF	THA	Jaturapat Sattham
41	FW	JPN	Ryoma Ito
42	DF	THA	Kittipong Sansanit
46	GK	THA	Noppakun Kadtoon
47	DF	BRA	Jorge Fellipe
70	FW	THA	Sattawat Proithaisong
71	MF	THA	Chanathip Thiankhao
72	GK	THA	Phatcharaphol Wuttiwong
73	GK	THA	Tanatik Amphayap
80	MF	THA	Chayathorn Tapsuvanavon
87	GK	THA	Thanawat Panthong

Note 1: The official club website lists the supporters as player 12th man. Note 2: Players who are AFC Champions League quota foreign players are listed in bold.

=== Out on loan ===
Note: Flags indicate national team as defined under FIFA eligibility rules; some limited exceptions apply. Players may hold more than one non-FIFA nationality.

No.	Pos.	Nation	Player
3	DF	THA	Chatmongkol Rueangthanarot (at Nara)
6	DF	THA	Songchai Thongcham (at Police Tero)
9	FW	THA	Adisak Kraisorn (at Burapha United)
13	FW	THA	Warakorn Thongbai (at Chainat Hornbill)
20	DF	THA	Suksan Bunta (at Ayutthaya PK)

No.	Pos.	Nation	Player
22	GK	THA	Chommaphat Boonloet (at Pattaya United)
27	GK	THA	Anuchid Taweesri (at Saimit Kabin United)
30	DF	THA	Nuttanun Biasumrit (at Pattani)
64	MF	THA	Kasidit Kalasin (at Nakhon Pathom United)
65	DF	THA	Bukkoree Lemdee (at Nakhon Ratchasima)
86	DF	THA	Parinya Nusong (at Phitsanulok)

== Management and staff ==
=== Management ===
Position	Name
Chairman	(Thailand) Wittaya Khunpluem
Co-chairman	(Thailand) Anop Singtothong
Marketing and public relations director	(Thailand) Jirasak Jomthong
Club secretary	(Thailand) Thitikon Arjwarin
Technical director	(Thailand) Withaya Laohakul

=== Technical staff ===
Position	Name
Head coach	(Thailand) Therdsak Chaiman
Assistant coach	(Thailand) Puriphat Niyomjit
Goalkeeping coach	(Thailand) Boonkong Akkaboot
Fitness coach	(Brazil) Rafael Monteiro (Thailand) Wanchalerm Tothong
Club doctor	(Thailand) Dr. Rungrat Jittakarn

== Honours ==
=== League ===
- Thai League 1
  - Winners (1): 2007
  - Runners-up (5): 2008, 2009, 2011, 2012, 2014
- Thai League 2
  - Winners (1): 2024–25
- Provincial League:
  - Winners (1): 2005

=== Cups ===
- FA Cup
  - Winners (2): 2010, 2016
  - Runners-up (2): 2014, 2020–21
- Kor Royal Cup:
  - Winners (4): 2007, 2009, 2011, 2012

== Records and statistics ==
As of 3 November 2026

Top 10 all-time appearances
Rank	Player	Years	Club appearances
1	(Thailand) Pipob On-Mo	2006–2018	404
2	(Thailand) Chonlatit Jantakam	2004–2019	301
3	(Thailand) Kroekrit Thaweekarn	2012–2024	236
4	(Thailand) Noppanon Kachaplayuk	2010–2024	224
5	(Thailand) Saharat Sontisawat	2016–present	176
6	(Thailand) Chanin Sae-ear	2010–2024	172
7	(Thailand) Kritsada Kaman	2015–2023	168
8	(Thailand) Worachit Kanitsribampen	2013–2021	162
9	(Thailand) Channarong Promsrikaew	2018–present	158
10	(Thailand) Sinthaweechai Hathairattanakool	2007–2015, 2019–2021, 2024	152

Top 10 all-time scorers
Rank	Player	Club appearances	Total goals
1	(Thailand) Pipob On-Mo	404	104
2	(Brazil) Thiago Cunha	81	57
3	(Thailand) Worachit Kanitsribampen	162	40
4	(Brazil) Leandro Assumpção	77	32
5	(Brazil) Renan Marques	35	27
6	(Thailand) Nurul Sriyankem	134	24
7	(Ivory Coast) Amadou Ouattara	82	22
10	(Ghana) Prince Amponsah	59	21
10	(South Korea) Yoo Byung-soo	63	21
10	(Thailand) Kroekrit Thaweekarn	236	21

- Biggest wins:
  - 7–0 vs Uttaradit (4 July 2018)
  - 7–0 vs Kalasin Sauropod (8 November 2020)
  - 7–0 vs Khon Kaen United (25 September 2021)
- Heaviest defeats: 9–0 vs (Japan) FC Tokyo (9 February 2016)
- Youngest ever debutant: Pacharaphol Lekkun ~ 16 years 7 months 25 days old (on 29 January 2023 vs BG Pathum United)
- Oldest ever player: Therdsak Chaiman ~ 42 years 2 months 14 days old (on 13 December 2015 vs Saraburi)
- Youngest goal scorers: Nititorn Sripramarn ~ 17 years 11 months 3 days old (on 4 July 2018 vs Uttaradit)
- Oldest goal scorers: Therdsak Chaiman ~ 40 years 8 months 24 days old (on 22 June 2014 vs TOT)

== Former players ==
As of 2026–27 season.

For details on former players, see List of Chonburi players and Category: Chonburi players.

=== International capped players ===
AFC/OFC: (Bahrain) Jaycee John; (Brunei) Faiq Bolkiah; (Indonesia) Irfan Bachdim; (Japan) Ryotaro Nakano; (Malaysia) Fergus Tierney; (Malaysia) Junior Eldstål; (Myanmar) Sithu Aung; (Myanmar) Zaw Min Tun; (Philippines) Ángel Guirado; (Philippines) Carli de Murga; (Philippines) Diego Bardanca; (Philippines) Jefferson Tabinas; (Philippines) Jesse Curran; (Philippines) Kevin Ray Mendoza; (Philippines) Kike Linares; (Philippines) Patrick Cruz; (Philippines) Patrick Deyto; (Singapore) Zulfahmi Arifin; (South Korea) Cho Byung-kuk; (South Korea) Lee Chan-dong; (South Korea) Park Hyun-beom; (South Korea) Yoo Byung-soo	CAF: (Democratic Republic of the Congo) Jonathan Bolingi; (Sudan) Abo Eisa; (Togo) Thomas Dossevi	UEFA: (Croatia) Renato Kelić; (France) Geoffrey Doumeng; (Montenegro) Dragan Bošković	CONMEBOL/ CONCACAF: (Brazil) Ciro Alves; (Brazil) Juliano Mineiro

== Managerial history ==
Chonburi managers by years (2004–present)

Name	Period	Honours
(Thailand) Witthaya Laohakul	2004–2006	
(Thailand) Jadet Meelarp	2007–2008	– 2007 Thailand Premier League – 2007 Kor Royal Cup
(Thailand) Kiatisuk Senamuang	2008–2009	– 2009 Kor Royal Cup
(Thailand) Jadet Meelarp (2)	2010–2011	– 2010 Thai FA Cup – 2011 Kor Royal Cup
(Thailand) Witthaya Laohakul (2)	2011–2013	– 2012 Kor Royal Cup
(Japan) Masahiro Wada	2014	
(Thailand) Jadet Meelarp (3)	2015	
(Thailand) Therdsak Chaiman	2016–2017	– 2016 Thai FA Cup
(Germany) Goran Barjaktarević	2018–2018	
(Thailand) Jukkapant Punpee	2018–2019	
(Thailand) Sasom Pobprasert	2019–2023	
(Thailand) Adul Lahsoh (caretaker)	2023	
(Japan) Makoto Teguramori	2023	
(Thailand) Nutthawut Vijitwetchakarn (interim)	2023–2024	
(Thailand) Witthaya Laohakul (caretaker)	2024	
(Thailand) Pipob On-Mo	2024	
(Thailand) Sinthaweechai Hathairattanakool (caretaker)	2024	
(Thailand) Thawatchai Damrong-Ongtrakul	2024–2025	– 2024–25 Thai League 2
(Thailand) Teerasak Po-on	2025	
(Thailand) Witthaya Laohakul (caretaker) (3)	2025	
(Thailand) Rangsan Viwatchaichok	2025–2026	
(Thailand) Witthaya Laohakul (caretaker) (4)	2026–	
(Thailand) Therdsak Chaiman (2)	2026–present	

== Continental record ==
Season	Competition	Round	Club	Home	Away	Aggregate
2008	AFC Champions League	Group G	(Japan) Gamba Osaka	0–2	1–1	4th out of 4
2008	AFC Champions League	Group G	(Australia) Melbourne Victory	3–1	1–3	4th out of 4
2008	AFC Champions League	Group G	(South Korea) Chunnam Dragons	2–2	0–1	4th out of 4
2009	AFC Cup	Group G	(Hong Kong) Eastern	4–1	1–2	1st out of 4
2009	AFC Cup	Group G	(Malaysia) Kedah	3–1	1–0	1st out of 4
2009	AFC Cup	Group G	(Vietnam) Hanoi ACB	6–0	2–0	1st out of 4
2009	AFC Cup	Round of 16	(Indonesia) PSMS Medan	4–0		
2009	AFC Cup	Quarter-finals	(Vietnam) Bình Dương	2–2	0–2	2–4
2011	AFC Cup	Group H	(India) East Bengal	4–0	4–4	1st out of 4
2011	AFC Cup	Group H	(Hong Kong) South China	3–0	3–0	1st out of 4
2011	AFC Cup	Group H	(Indonesia) Persipura Jayapura	4–1	0–3	1st out of 4
2011	AFC Cup	Round of 16	(Indonesia) Sriwijaya	3–0		
2011	AFC Cup	Quarter-finals	(Uzbekistan) Nasaf Qarshi	0–1	1–0 (a.e.t.)	1–1 (3–4 p)
2012	AFC Champions League	Qualifying play-off	(South Korea) Pohang Steelers	0–2		
2012	AFC Cup	Group G	(Myanmar) Yangon United	1–0	1–1	1st out of 4
2012	AFC Cup	Group G	(Singapore) Home United	1–0	2–1	1st out of 4
2012	AFC Cup	Group G	(Hong Kong) Citizen	2–0	3–3	1st out of 4
2012	AFC Cup	Round of 16	(Iraq) Al-Zawra'a	1–0		
2012	AFC Cup	Quarter-finals	(Syria) Al-Shorta	1–2	4–2 (a.e.t.)	5–4
2012	AFC Cup	Semi-finals	(Iraq) Arbil	1–4	1–4	2–8
2014	AFC Champions League	Qualifying play-off round 2	(Hong Kong) South China	3–0		
2014	AFC Champions League	Qualifying play-off round 3	(China) Beijing Guoan	0–4		
2015	AFC Champions League	Qualifying preliminary round 2	(Hong Kong) Kitchee	4–1		
2015	AFC Champions League	Qualifying play-off round	(Japan) Kashiwa Reysol	2–3 (a.e.t.)		
2016	AFC Champions League	Qualifying preliminary round 2	(Myanmar) Yangon United	3–2 (a.e.t.)		
2016	AFC Champions League	Qualifying play-off round	(Japan) FC Tokyo	0–9		

== Season by season record ==
Season	League									FA Cup	League Cup	Queen's Cup	Kor Royal Cup	AFC Champions League	AFC Cup	ASEAN Club	Top scorer	
Season	Division	P	W	D	L	F	A	Pts	Pos	FA Cup	League Cup	Queen's Cup	Kor Royal Cup	AFC Champions League	AFC Cup	ASEAN Club	Name	Goals
2006	TPL	22	5	12	5	29	28	27	8th	–	–	GR	–	–	–	–	(Thailand) Pipob On-Mo	7
2007	TPL	30	19	6	5	50	25	63	1st	–	–	–	–	–	–	–	(Thailand) Pipob On-Mo	16
2008	TPL	30	15	14	1	34	14	59	2nd	–	–	SF	W	GR	–	–	(Thailand) Pipob On-Mo	5
2009	TPL	30	18	8	4	50	30	62	2nd	R4	–	SF	W	–	QF	–	(Ivory Coast) Mohamed Koné	14
2010	TPL	30	17	9	4	57	28	60	3rd	W	R2	SF	–	–	–	–	(Thailand) Pipob On-Mo	10
2011	TPL	34	20	9	5	58	29	69	2nd	R5	SF	–	W	–	QF	–	(Thailand) Pipob On-Mo	15
2012	TPL	34	21	7	6	65	33	70	2nd	R3	QF	–	W	Play-off	SF	–	(Thailand) Pipob On-Mo	14
2013	TPL	32	18	8	6	61	35	62	3rd	R3	QF	–	–	–	–	–	(Brazil) Thiago Cunha	13
2014	TPL	38	21	13	4	62	33	76	2nd	RU	R3	–	–	Play-off 3	–	–	(Brazil) Thiago Cunha	20
2015	TPL	34	15	12	7	62	44	57	4th	QF	R3	–	–	Play-off	–	–	(Brazil) Thiago Cunha	19
2016	TL	31	14	9	8	52	33	51	5th	W	R3	–	–	Play-off	–	–	(Brazil) Rodrigo Vergilio	12
2017	T1	34	15	8	11	59	59	53	7th	R1	R2	–	–	–	–	–	(Brazil) Renan Marques	27
2018	T1	34	13	7	14	45	53	46	9th	QF	QF	–	–	–	–	–	(Thailand) Worachit Kanitsribampen	12
2019	T1	30	11	7	12	43	45	40	7th	R1	R1	–	–	–	–	–	(Brazil) Lukian	11
2020–21	T1	30	9	5	16	30	47	32	12th	RU	–	–	–	–	–	–	(Brazil) Caion	6
2021–22	T1	30	12	8	10	50	40	44	7th	R2	SF	–	–	–	–	–	(South Korea) Yoo Byung-Soo	12
2022–23	T1	30	13	4	13	46	38	43	6th	R2	R1	–	–	–	–	–	(Brazil) Danilo Alves	14
2023–24	T1	30	7	9	14	33	52	30	14th	QF	R2	–	–	–	–	–	(Brazil) Willian Lira	15
2024–25	T2	32	19	6	7	56	30	63	1st	R2	R1	–	–	–	–	–	(Brazil) Derley	14
2025–26	T1	30	10	9	11	38	41	39	8th	R1	SF	–	–	–	–	–	(Netherlands) Oege-Sietse van Lingen	8

Champions	Runners-up	Third place	Promoted	Relegated	In progress

- P = Played
- W = Games won
- D = Games drawn
- L = Games lost
- F = Goals for
- A = Goals against
- Pts = Points
- Pos = Final position
- TL = Thai League
- T1 = Thai League 1
- T2 = Thai League 2
- DQ = Disqualified
- QR1 = First Qualifying Round
- QR2 = Second Qualifying Round
- QR3 = Third Qualifying Round
- QR4 = Fourth Qualifying Round
- RInt = Intermediate Round
- R1 = Round 1
- R2 = Round 2
- R3 = Round 3
- R4 = Round 4
- R5 = Round 5
- R6 = Round 6
- GR = Group stage
- QF = Quarter-finals
- SF = Semi-finals
- RU = Runners-up
- S = Shared
- W = Winners
