= Jakkapong Sanmahung =

Thai footballer (born 2002)

Personal information
- Full name: Jakkapong Sanmahung
- Date of birth: 6 April 2002 (age 24)
- Place of birth: Sakon Nakhon, Thailand
- Height: 1.79 m (5 ft 10 1/2 in)
- Positions: Centre back; left back

Team information
- Current team: Chonburi

Youth career
- 2015–2019: Chonburi

Senior career*
Years	Team	Apps	(Gls)
2020–	Chonburi	57	(0)
2020	→ Banbueng (loan)	13	(1)
2021	→ Khon Kaen United (loan)	7	(0)
2023	→ Uthai Thani (loan)	15	(0)
2025	→ Nakhon Ratchasima (loan)	12	(0)
2026	→ Police Tero (loan)	9	(0)

International career^{‡}
2017	Thailand U16	4	(0)
2019	Thailand U19	6	(1)
2023–2024	Thailand U23	11	(1)
- * Club domestic league appearances and goals as of 18 May 2026 ‡ National team caps and goals as of 26 April 2023

Jakkapong Sanmahung (Thai: จักรพงษ์ แสนมะฮุง, born 6 April 2002) is a Thai professional footballer who plays as a centre back for Chonburi.

== Club career ==
Sanmahung made national headlines in 2018 when he became the youngest player to score for Chonburi, doing so for the club's 'B' team in the Thai League 4. For the 2020 season, he was loaned to Thai League 3 side Banbueng, alongside teammate Warakorn Thongbai.

In 2021, he stepped up to the Thai League 2, signing on loan for Khon Kaen United, again making the move with Thongbai.

On his return to Chonburi, he established himself in the first team in the 2021–22 season.

== International career ==
Sanmahung has represented Thailand at under-15 and under-16 level. While representing Thailand U16, Jakkapong scored against Northern Mariana Islands U16 in the 2018 AFC U-16 Championship qualification. Jakkapong also scored against Brunei U19 in the 2020 AFC U-19 Championship qualification.

== Personal life ==
Jakkapong is the brother of fellow professional footballer Nitipong Sanmahung.

== Career statistics ==
=== Club ===
As of 15 October 2022.

Club	Season	League			National Cup		League Cup		Other		Total	
Club	Season	Division	Apps	Goals	Apps	Goals	Apps	Goals	Apps	Goals	Apps	Goals
Chonburi	2020–21	Thai League 1	0	0	0	0	0	0	0	0	0	0
Chonburi	2021–22	Thai League 1	15	0	2 (Note: Appearances in the Thai FA Cup)	0	3 (Note: Appearances in the Thai League Cup)	0	0	0	20	0
Chonburi	2022–23	Thai League 1	2	0	0	0	0	0	0	0	2	0
Chonburi	Total		17	0	2	0	3	0	0	0	22	0
Banbueng (loan)	2020–21	Thai League 3	–		1	0	–		0	0	1	0
Khon Kaen United (loan)	2020–21	Thai League 2	6	0	0	0	–		1 (Note: Appearances in the Thai League 2 playoffs)	0	7	0
Career total			23	0	3	0	3	0	1	0	30	0

== Honours ==
=== Club ===
Chonburi

- Thai League 2 : 2024–25

=== International ===
Thailand U23

- SEA Games (silver) Silver medal: 2023
