= Warakorn Thongbai =

Thai footballer

Personal information
- Full name: Warakorn Thongbai
- Date of birth: 22 May 2002 (age 24)
- Place of birth: Samut Prakan, Thailand
- Height: 1.80 m (5 ft 11 in)
- Positions: Left-back; winger

Team information
- Current team: Chainat Hornbill
- Number: 13

Youth career
- 2016–2019: Chonburi

Senior career*
Years	Team	Apps	(Gls)
2020–2024	Chonburi	0	(0)
2020	→ Banbueng (loan)	16	(3)
2021	→ Khon Kaen United (loan)	9	(0)
2021–2022	→ Nongbua Pitchaya (loan)	8	(1)
2022	→ Samut Prakan City (loan)	12	(0)
2023	→ Krabi (loan)	7	(0)
2023–2024	→ Customs United (loan)	29	(0)
2024–2025	→ Trat (loan)	17	(1)
2025–	Chainat Hornbill	23	(1)

International career
2017–2018	Thailand U16	11	(6)
2020	Thailand U19	8	(2)
2021	Thailand U23	1	(0)
- * Club domestic league appearances and goals as of 26 April 2025

Warakorn Thongbai (Thai: วรากร ทองใบ; born 22 May 2002) is a Thai footballer currently playing as a left-back or a winger for Thai League 2 club Chainat Hornbill.

== Club career ==
Born in Samut Prakan province, Warakorn was loaned to Thai League 3 side Banbueng in 2020, alongside teammate Jakkapong Sanmahung. However, after the league was cut short due to the COVID-19 pandemic in Thailand, he returned to parent club Chonburi.

The 2021 season was a better one for Warakorn, with a jump up to the Thai League 2 when he was loaned to Khon Kaen United, again making the move alongside Sanmahung. After six games in the league, he played three times in the promotion play-offs, scoring the winning penalty to send Khon Kaen United to the Thai League 1.

The following year, he was loaned again, this time to Nongbua Pitchaya of Thai League 1. He made eight appearances in the league, scoring once.

== International career ==
Warakorn has represented Thailand at under-14, under-16 and under-19 level.

Warakorn scored 4 goals in total in the 2018 AFC U-16 Championship qualification while playing for Thailand U16 against Northern Mariana Islands U16 and Timor-Leste U16. In the 2018 AFC U-16 Championship, he scored 2 goals for Thailand U16 against Japan U16 and Malaysia U16.

In the 2020 AFC U-19 Championship qualification, Warakorn scored 2 goals for Thailand U19 against Brunei U19 and Northern Mariana Islands U19.

He was called up to the under-23 squad for the first time in August 2021.

== Career statistics ==
=== Club ===
As of 15 October 2022.

Club	Season	League			National Cup		League Cup		Other		Total	
Club	Season	Division	Apps	Goals	Apps	Goals	Apps	Goals	Apps	Goals	Apps	Goals
Chonburi	2020–21	Thai League 1	0	0	0	0	0	0	0	0	0	0
Chonburi	2021–22	Thai League 1	0	0	0	0	0	0	0	0	0	0
Chonburi	2022–23	Thai League 1	0	0	0	0	0	0	0	0	0	0
Chonburi	Total		0	0	0	0	0	0	0	0	0	0
Banbueng (loan)	2020–21	Thai League 3	–		1 (Note: Appearances in the Thai FA Cup)	2	–		0	0	1	2
Khon Kaen United (loan)	2020–21	Thai League 2	6	0	0	0	–		3 (Note: Appearances in the Thai League 2 playoffs)	0	9	0
Nongbua Pitchaya (loan)	2021–22	Thai League 1	8	1	2	0	1 (Note: Appearances in the Thai League Cup)	1	0	0	11	2
Samut Prakan City (loan)	2021–22	Thai League 2	6	0	1	0	–		0	0	7	0
Career total			20	1	4	2	1	1	3	0	28	4
