= Khairol Anwar Yaakub =

Bruneian footballer

Khairol Anwar
Personal information
- Full name: Haji Khairol Anwar bin Haji Mohammad Yaakub
- Date of birth: 27 March 1987 (age 39)
- Place of birth: Brunei
- Positions: Midfielder; forward

Senior career*
Years	Team	Apps	(Gls)
2002	Brunei		
2003	Sengkurong		
2004–2008	DPMM		
2009–2010	NBT		
2010–2011	BIBD SRC		
2012–2013	Jerudong		(0)
2013–2014	Najip		(1)
2015	Kota Ranger		(0)
2016–2017	Kasuka		(4)
2018–2019	Kota Ranger		(1)

International career
2005–2007	Brunei U21		(2)
2001–2008	Brunei	3	(0)
- * Club domestic league appearances and goals

Haji Khairol Anwar bin Haji Mohammad Yaakub (born 27 March 1987) is a Bruneian former footballer who played as a midfielder or forward. Having made his international bow in 2001, Khairol Anwar is the youngest Bruneian debutant at the age of 14 years and 30 days.

== Club career ==
=== Brunei and Sengkurong ===
Khairol Anwar was a Brunei youth international who became a squad member of the Bruneian representative side in the Malaysian league in the 2002 season, coached by Mick Lyons who was in charge of the Wasps for a second spell. At local club level, he turned out for Sengkurong FC, who were able to proceed to the second stage of the 2003 B-League.

=== DPMM ===
At the start of the 2004 season, local giants and inaugural B-League winners DPMM FC acquired Khairol Anwar's services, and he duly scored his first goal for the club in a 8–0 victory over Kasuka FC in an FA Cup fixture on 12 September. He picked up a championship medal as well as one for the FA Cup as DPMM became winners of the domestic double.

In the 2005 Champions Cup, Khairol Anwar scored the first DPMM goal against MS ABDB who were two goals up to galvanise his side to a successful comeback, the match ending 4–3 to the Crown Prince's team. At the end of the year, DPMM transferred to the Malaysia Premier League to replace the Brunei national representative team.

In DPMM's first season in Malaysia, new signing Shah Razen Said from AH United linked up well with the likes of Brazilian forwards Rodrigo Tosi and Tiago dos Santos, with Malaysia Cup winner Fadlin Galawat serving as backup. Khairol Anwar struggled to gain playing time while the team enjoyed promotion to the Malaysia Super League in their first attempt. He subsequently missed the entire 2006–07 Malaysia Super League season as DPMM became the surprise package of the Malaysian top flight, reaching third place in the standings with Shah Razen becoming joint top-scorer in the league.

Khairol Anwar extended his time with DPMM in the 2007–08 season but only featured for the team at the tail end of a disappointing campaign, finishing in tenth place.

=== NBT ===
At the end of the 2007–08 season, Khairol Anwar left DPMM to join NBT FC for the 2009–10 Brunei Premier League, with Azman Ilham Noor and Abu Bakar Mahari going in the opposite direction. The club affiliated with Brunei's Toyota distributor struggled at the foot of the table, eventually finishing in the relegation playoff place. They fared better in the FA Cup where they went all the way to the semi-finals, before being beaten 7–1 by eventual winners QAF FC.

On 13 April 2010 Khairol Anwar scored the consolation goal for NBT at their Premier League relegation play-off against the Prisons Department, in a 1–5 loss.

=== BIBD SRC ===
Khairol Anwar transferred to the BIBD Sports and Recreational Club in 2011, competing for a place in a forthcoming Bruneian football league set up by the newly-formed NFABD via the 2011–12 Brunei National Football League. The Bankers finished fourth in their BNFL group, which should have allowed them to compete in Brunei's second tier, but the club withdrew by the time the league commenced in 2014.

=== Later career in the Brunei leagues ===
Khairol Anwar's next destination was Jerudong FC for the inaugural 2012–13 Brunei Super League. The following season, he heeded the call of the late Johari Bungsu and laced up for Najip FC where his former DPMM contemporary Maududi Hilmi Kasmi was also playing. Through a mix of talented youth internationals like Hanif Hamir and established veterans like Norsillmy Taha, the team immediately shed their pushover labels and stormed to third place in the league as well as an FA Cup final appearance.

Khairol Anwar moved down a division to play for Kota Ranger FC in the 2015 Brunei Premier League, and won the league and promotion to the Super League without losing thanks to the stellar lineup of ex-DPMM players such as himself, Sallehuddin Damit and Nurul Azami Hussin. He then switched to fellow promoted side Kasuka FC in the 2016 season and stayed there for two seasons, scoring four goals. He would play a final season back with Kota Ranger in the 2018–19 season, winning the year's FA Cup by beating MS PDB in the final by two goals to one.

== International career ==
At just 14 years of age, Khairol Anwar was selected for the 2002 World Cup qualification squad for the Brunei national team, whose strength was diminished due to regular squad members having to play for the Brunei representative club side in the 2001 Liga Perdana 2 that was running at the same time. On 27 April 2001, two weeks after Brunei's record 0–12 loss against the UAE, the youngster played as a starter against Yemen at Althawra Sports City Stadium and fared well against the Middle Eastern opposition, whose solitary and winning goal was made immediately after he was substituted in the 75th minute. It was to be his only involvement in the disastrous campaign, and Brunei would not play another World Cup qualifier until 2015. Khairol Anwar's appearance in a competitive international match at the age of 14 years and 30 days would have beaten Aung Kyaw Tun's record of the youngest international footballer made a year earlier, before it was eclipsed by Lucas Knecht in 2007.

Under debuting South Korean handler Kwon Oh-son, Khairol Anwar was a member of the Brunei under-21 squad for the 2005 Hassanal Bolkiah Trophy in March, as the host nation. The Young Wasps won their first fixture through a late goal by Shah Razen Said against Laos, but lost terribly against Myanmar four days later. Needing to win by a six goal margin against Singapore should Laos become victorious against Myanmar, Brunei went all guns blazing but conceded early in the first half. Khairol Anwar then managed to score Brunei's first goal in the second half but the team in yellow could only score two more goals and ultimately fell short of advancing to the semi-finals as Laos had beaten Myanmar 2–1. Later in the year, Khairol Anwar also made appearances for the Young Wasps at the 2005 AFF U-20 Youth Championship where they finished bottom in their group.

Khairol Anwar was selected for his second Hassanal Bolkiah Trophy in 2007. In the first fixture against Cambodia, he duly opened the scoring in a 2–2 draw. He would also play from the start in the other two group games, where a 3–1 defeat to Myanmar in the third game foiled Brunei from advancing to the knockout stages by virtue of goals scored, when on the same day Cambodia beat the Philippines 6–0.

Khairol Anwar lastly made two substitute appearances for the full national team at the 2008 AFC Challenge Cup qualification matches held in the Philippines in May 2008, in a 1–1 draw against Bhutan and also a 0–4 loss to Tajikistan.

== Honours ==
=== Team ===
DPMM

- B-League: 2004
- Brunei FA Cup: 2004
- Brunei Super Cup: 2005

Najip

- Brunei FA Cup: 2014 (runners-up)

Kota Ranger

- Brunei Premier League: 2015
- Brunei FA Cup: 2018–19
