= Myanmar national under-20 football team =

National association football team

Myanmar U20
- Nickname: Chinthe
- Association: Myanmar Football Federation
- Confederation: AFC (Asia)
- Sub-confederation: AFF (Southeast Asia)
- Head coach: Ryuji Sueoka
- Captain: Swan Htet
- Most caps: Lwin Moe Aung (37)
- Top scorer: Win Naing Tun (25)
- Home stadium: Thuwunna Stadium; Bogyoke Aung San Stadium; Zayyarthiri Stadium
- FIFA code: MYA
First colours	Second colours

First international
- Hong Kong 2–1 Burma (Kuala Lumpur, Malaya; 18 April 1959)

Biggest win
- Burma 8–0 Singapore (Manila, Philippines; 30 April 1966)

Biggest defeat
- Japan 8–0 Myanmar (Bangkok, Thailand; 12 November 2007)

FIFA U-20 World Cup
- Appearances: 1 (first in 2015)
- Best result: Group stage (2015)

AFC U-19 Championship
- Appearances: 19 (first in 1959)
- Best result: Winners (1961, 1963, 1964, 1966, 1968, 1969, 1970)

Myanmar national under-20 football team is the under-20 football team of Myanmar. It was known as the Burma national youth football team before 1989. During a ten-year span between 1961 and 1970, Burma thoroughly dominated the U-19/U-20 Asian Cup, reaching the finals eight times and winning the tournament seven times. The team participated in 2014 AFC U-19 Championship and qualified for the 2015 FIFA U-20 World Cup in New Zealand after reaching the semi-finals stage. This was the début appearance of the team in the World Cup competition.

== International records ==
=== FIFA U-20 World Cup ===
Year	Round	GP	W	D	L	GS	GA	Squad
(Tunisia) 1977 to (Nigeria) 1999	DNP	-	-	-	-	-	-	
(Argentina) 2001 to (Turkey) 2013	DNQ	-	-	-	-	-	-	
(New Zealand) 2015	Group stage	3	0	0	3	2	13	Squad
(South Korea) 2017 to (Azerbaijan) (Uzbekistan) 2027	DNQ	-	-	-	-	-	-	
(Georgia (country)) (Armenia) 2029	TBD	-	-	-	-	-	-	
Total	Best: Group stage	3	0	0	3	2	13	

FIFA U-20 World Cup History
Year	Round	squad	Score	Result
(New Zealand) 2015	Group stage	Squad		
(New Zealand) 2015	Group stage	Squad	United States 2-1 Myanmar	Loss
(New Zealand) 2015	Group stage	Squad	Myanmar 0–6 Ukraine	Loss
(New Zealand) 2015	Group stage	Squad	New Zealand 5–1 Myanmar	Loss

=== AFC U-19 Championship ===
AFC Youth Championship
Year	Result	Pld	W	D	L	GF	GA	squad
(Federation of Malaya) 1959	Group stage	4	3	1	0	24	11	
(Federation of Malaya) 1960	Group stage	3	1	0	2	10	7	
(Thailand) 1961	Champions*	5	3	2	0	13	8	
(Thailand) 1962	Group stage	4	1	0	3	1	8	
(Federation of Malaya) 1963	Champions*	6	4	2	0	17	5	
(South Vietnam) 1964	Champions*	4	2	1	1	8	3	
(Japan) 1965	Runners-up	6	5	0	1	13	6	
(Philippines) 1966	Champions*	7	5	1	1	23	4	
(Thailand) 1967	Third place	6	5	0	1	14	1	
(South Korea) 1968	Champions	7	6	1	0	23	3	
(Thailand) 1969	Champions	6	4	2	0	22	6	
(Philippines) 1970	Champions	6	5	0	1	15	1	
(Japan) 1971	Third place	6	4	1	1	16	2	
(Thailand) 1972	Quarter-finals	4	3	0	1	12	2	
(Iran) 1973	Quarter-finals	4	3	0	1	8	3	
(Thailand) 1974	Group stage	3	1	1	1	2	2	
(Kuwait) 1975	Group stage	4	1	2	1	4	4	
(Thailand) 1976	Quarter-finals	4	2	0	2	11	3	
(Iran) 1977 to (Thailand) 1998	DNP							
(Iran) 2000 to (United Arab Emirates) 2012	DNQ							
(Myanmar) 2014	Semi-finals^{1}	5	2	1	2	6	5	squad
(Bahrain) 2016 to (China) 2027	DNQ							
(China) 2029								
Total	Best: Champions	94	60	15	19	242	84	

- Champions* : Title shared
- DNP : Did not participate
- DNQ : Did not qualify
^{1} No third place playoff.

=== AFF U19 Youth Championship ===
AFF U19 Youth Championship
Year	Round	GP	W	D	L	GF	GA
(Thailand) (Cambodia) 2002	Runners-up	6	3	1	2	12	8
(Myanmar) (Vietnam) 2003	Champions	5	4	1	0	20	3
(Indonesia) 2005	Champions	6	5	0	1	11	6
(Malaysia) 2006	Did not enter	-	-	-	-	-	-
(Vietnam) 2007	Fourth place	5	3	0	2	9	7
(Thailand) 2008	Did not enter	-	-	-	-	-	-
(Vietnam) 2009	Group stage	3	1	0	2	4	5
(Vietnam) 2010	Did not enter	-	-	-	-	-	-
(Myanmar) 2011	Fourth place	6	3	1	2	10	3
(Vietnam) 2012	Did not enter	-	-	-	-	-	-
(Indonesia) 2013	Group stage	5	1	2	2	13	10
(Vietnam) 2014	Fourth place	4	2	0	2	6	6
(Laos) 2015	Group stage	4	2	1	1	3	3
(Vietnam) 2016	Group stage	5	2	2	1	11	10
(Myanmar) 2017	Fourth place	6	3	1	2	18	10
(Indonesia) 2018	Runners-up	6	3	1	2	17	9
(Vietnam) 2019	Fourth place	7	4	1	2	12	10
(Indonesia) 2022	Group stage	5	2	0	3	12	12
Total	Best: Champions	56	28	9	19	114	77

- The under-20 national team played at the 2002 to 2007 editions

=== Hassanal Bolkiah Trophy ===
Hassanal Bolkiah Trophy
Year	Result	Pld	W	D	L	GF	GA
(Brunei) 2002	Semi-finals	5	4	1	0	16	2
(Brunei) 2005	Runners-up	5	3	0	2	15	5
(Brunei) 2007	Runners-up	5	4	1	0	21	2
(Brunei) 2012	Semi-finals	5	3	1	1	15	6
(Brunei) 2014	Champions	6	6	0	0	19	9
(Brunei) 2018	Semi-finals	4	2	1	1	5	3
Total	Best: Champions	30	22	4	4	91	27

== Results and fixtures – Myanmar U-20 ==
Win Draw Loss

=== Group A ===
Pos	Team	Pld	W	D	L	GF	GA	GD	Pts	Group stage result
1	Ukraine	3	2	1	0	9	0	+9	7	Advance to knockout stage
2	United States	3	2	0	1	6	4	+2	6	Advance to knockout stage
3	New Zealand (H)	3	1	1	1	5	5	0	4	Advance to knockout stage
4	Myanmar	3	0	0	3	2	13	−11	0	

Source: FIFA
(H) Hosts
30 May 2015
13:00

New Zealand	0–0	Ukraine
	Report

North Harbour Stadium, Auckland
Attendance: 25,000
Referee: Mauro Vigliano (Argentina)
30 May 2015
16:00

United States	2–1	Myanmar
Tall 17'; Hyndman 56'	Report	Yan Naing Oo 9'

Northland Events Centre, Whangārei
Attendance: 5,816
Referee: Bernard Camille (Seychelles)

2 June 2015
13:00

Myanmar	0–6	Ukraine
	Report	Yaremchuk 51'; Luchkevych 54'; Kovalenko 57', 77'; Sobol 68'; Besyedin 71'

Northland Events Centre, Whangārei
Attendance: 4,985
Referee: Ricardo Marques (Brazil)
2 June 2015
19:00

New Zealand	0–4	United States
	Report	Jamieson 6'; Hyndman 33'; Arriola 57'; Rubin 83'

North Harbour Stadium, Auckland
Attendance: 15,678
Referee: Antonio Mateu Lahoz (Spain)

5 June 2015
19:00

Myanmar	1–5	New Zealand
Aung Thu 27'	Report	Billingsley 40'; Patterson 47'; Stevens 78'; Brotherton 81'; Lewis 89'

Wellington Regional Stadium, Wellington
Attendance: 15,527
Referee: John Pitti (Panama)
5 June 2015
19:00

Ukraine	3–0	United States
Kovalenko 56', 74', 79'	Report

North Harbour Stadium, Auckland
Attendance: 7,694
Referee: Eric Otogo-Castane (Gabon)

.

All times are in Myanmar Summer Time (Myanmar Daylight Time, IDT), although the 2015 FIFA U-20 World Cup is entirely held at New Zealand.

== Results and fixtures – Myanmar U-19 ==
Win Draw Loss

=== Group A ===
Team	Pld	W	D	L	GF	GA	GD	Pts
Thailand	3	2	0	1	5	6	−1	6
Myanmar	3	1	1	1	3	2	+1	4
Yemen	3	1	1	1	3	3	0	4
Iran	3	1	0	2	3	3	0	3

9 October 2014
15:30

Iran	1–2	Thailand
Mazloum 15'	Report	Thanasit 65'; Chenrop 82'

Thuwunna Stadium, Yangon
Attendance: 2,850
Referee: Abdulrahman Abdou (Qatar)
9 October 2014
18:30

Myanmar	0–0	Yemen
	Report

Thuwunna Stadium, Yangon
Attendance: 13,142
Referee: Ryuji Sato (Japan)

11 October 2014
15:30

Yemen	1–0	Iran
Al-Sarori 6'	Report

Thuwunna Stadium, Yangon
Attendance: 24,568
Referee: Mohd Amirul Izwan Bin Yaacob (Malaysia)
11 October 2014
18:30

Thailand	0–3	Myanmar
	Report	Nyein Chan Aung 13', 18'; Aung Thu 42'

Thuwunna Stadium, Yangon
Attendance: 24,568
Referee: Nawaf Shukralla (Bahrain)

13 October 2014
18:30

Myanmar	0–2	Iran
	Report	Seyyedi 56'; Moharrami 83'

Thuwunna Stadium, Yangon
Attendance: 19,784
Referee: Abdullah Al Hilali (Oman)
13 October 2014
18:30

Thailand	3–2	Yemen
Patiphan 40', 85', 88'	Report	K. Mahdi 1'; Mohammed 64'

Wunna Theikdi Stadium, Nay Pyi Taw
Attendance: 600
Referee: Strebre Delovski (Australia)

All times are in Myanmar Summer Time (Myanmar Daylight Time, IDT), although the 2014 AFC U-19 Asian Cup is entirely held at Myanmar.

=== Knockout stage ===
In the knockout stage, extra time and penalty shoot-out are used to decide the winner if necessary.

Quarter-finals
17 October 2014
Thailand	1
Uzbekistan	2
17 October 2014
Japan	1 (4)
North Korea (p)	1 (5)
17 October 2014
United Arab Emirates	0
Myanmar	1
17 October 2014
Qatar	4
China	2

Semi-finals
20 October 2014
Uzbekistan	0
North Korea	5
20 October 2014
Myanmar	2
Qatar (a.e.t.)	3

Final
23 October 2014
North Korea	0
Qatar	1

=== Quarter-finals ===
Winners qualified for 2015 FIFA U-20 World Cup.

17 October 2014
19:00

Thailand	1–2	Uzbekistan
Chenrop 48'	Report	Urinboev 6', 20'

Thuwunna Stadium, Yangon
Attendance: 29,000
Referee: Abdulrahman Abdou (Qatar)

17 October 2014
15:30

United Arab Emirates	0–1	Myanmar
	Report	Than Paing 53'

Thuwunna Stadium, Yangon
Attendance: 29,000
Referee: Ryuji Sato (Japan)

17 October 2014
15:30

Japan	1–1 (a.e.t.)	North Korea
Minamino 83' (pen.)	Report	Kim Kuk-chol 36'
Penalties
Mochizuki (penalty scored); Sakai (penalty scored); Ideguchi (penalty scored); Nakatani (penalty scored); Minamino (penalty missed)	4–5	(penalty scored) Kang Nam-gwon; (penalty scored) Ri Un-chol; (penalty scored) Min Hyo-song; (penalty scored) Jon Kum-dong; (penalty scored) Jo Sol-song

Wunna Theikdi Stadium, Nay Pyi Taw
Attendance: 400
Referee: Fahad Al-Mirdasi (Saudi Arabia)

17 October 2014
19:00

Qatar	4–2	China
Al Saadi 6'; Afif 45+5' (pen.); Moein 58'; Ali 90+6'	Report	Gui Hong 54'; Wei Jingzong 86' (pen.)

Wunna Theikdi Stadium, Nay Pyi Taw
Attendance: 400
Referee: Ravshan Irmatov (Uzbekistan)

=== Semi-finals ===
20 October 2014
15:30

Uzbekistan	0–5	North Korea
	Report	Jo Kwang-myong 5', 39', 63'; Kim Yu-song 70'; So Jong-hyok 73'

Thuwunna Stadium, Yangon
Attendance: 29,870
Referee: Abdulla Hassan Mohamed (United Arab Emirates)

20 October 2014
19:00

Myanmar	2–3 (a.e.t.)	Qatar
Aung Thu 62'; Nyein Chan Aung 64'	Report	Ali 45+1'; Afif 75'; Thiam 90+2'

Thuwunna Stadium, Yangon
Attendance: 29,870
Referee: Mohd Amirul Izwan Bin Yaacob (Malaysia)

== Current coaching staff ==
Position	Name
Head of Delegation	(Myanmar) Tin Myint Aung
Head coach	(Japan) Ryuji Sueoka
Assistant coach	(Myanmar) Bo Bo Aung (Myanmar) Lin Lin Htwe
Goalkeeping coach	(Japan) Yoshikatsu Kawaguchi
Fitness coach	(Myanmar) Soe Htin Aung
Doctor	(Myanmar) Phyo Min Oo
Physiotherapist	(Myanmar) Htun Zaw
Media officer	(Myanmar) Bo Min

== Players ==
=== Current squad ===
- The following players were called up for the 2024 ASEAN U-19 Boys Championship..
- Match dates: 17–29 July 2024
- Caps and goals correct as of: 29 June 2022
- Names in italics denote players who have been capped for the senior team.

No.	Pos.	Player	Date of birth (age)	Caps	Goals	Club
1	GK	Saw Kyaw Khant No	21 February 2005 (age 21)	4	0	(Myanmar Football Federation) Ayeyawady United
13	GK	Han Myint Myat Tun	19 November 2005 (age 20)	6	0	(Myanmar Football Federation) Mahar United
18	GK	Saw Ei Do Htoo		1	0	(Myanmar Football Federation) Dagon Port
2	DF	Lat Wai Phone	4 May 2005 (age 21)	8	0	(Myanmar Football Federation) Hantharwaddy
3	DF	Khant Zin Hein	18 April 2005 (age 21)	13	0	(Myanmar Football Federation) Mahar United
4	DF	Saw Lin Htet Paing		9	0	(Myanmar Football Federation) Rakhapura United
5	DF	Samuel Ngai Kee		8	0	(Myanmar Football Federation) Yadanarbon
19	DF	Khun Cho Htoo		5	0	(Myanmar Football Federation) Yangon United
22	DF	Phyo Pyae Sone	28 June 2005 (age 21)	10	1	(Myanmar Football Federation) Yangon United
23	DF	Hlwan Htet Tun		6	0	(Myanmar Football Federation) Yangon United
	DF	Aung Myint	5 April 2005 (age 21)	2	0	(Myanmar Football Federation) ISPE
6	MF	Naing Win Tun	15 November 2005 (age 21)	4	0	(Myanmar Football Federation) Thitsar Arman
7	MF	Swan Htet	12 April 2005 (age 21)	13	2	(Myanmar Football Federation) Dagon Star
15	MF	Zaw Myo Tun		5	0	(Myanmar Football Federation) Dagon Star United
16	MF	Naing Aung Sann		2	0	(Myanmar Football Federation) Dagon Port
21	MF	Ye Kaung Sat	20 January 2005 (age 21)	5	0	(Myanmar Football Federation) Thitsar Arman
8	FW	Min Maw Oo	6 March 2005 (age 21)	8	1	(Myanmar Football Federation) Thitsar Arman
9	FW	Saw Sae Ka'paw Say	26 May 2005 (age 21)	6	3	(Myanmar Football Federation) ISPE
10	FW	Win Pyae Maung	23 February 2006 (age 20)	8	2	(Myanmar Football Federation) ISPE
11	FW	Kaung Khant Kyaw	26 February 2007 (age 19)	5	1	(Myanmar Football Federation) Yangon United
12	FW	Shine Wanna Aung	15 March 2006 (age 20)	5	1	(Myanmar Football Federation) Thitsar Arman
20	FW	Zwe Man Thar	1 June 2005 (age 21)	6	0	(Myanmar Football Federation) Hantharwaddy
	FW	Mg Top		1	0	(Myanmar Football Federation) Dagon Star United

=== Recent call ups ===
Pos.	Player	Date of birth (age)	Caps	Goals	Club	Latest call-up
DF	Tun Tun Thein	3 December 2005 (age 20)	12	0	(Myanmar) Dagon Port	
MF	Wine Lu	11 December 2005 (age 20)	1	0	(Myanmar) Hantharwaddy	
MF	Win Ko Htay	2 August 2005 (age 21)	0	0	(Myanmar) Mahar United	
MF	Thein Zaw Thiha	8 February 2005 (age 21)	10	2	(Myanmar) ISPE	
FW	Sai Zayar Kyaw		0	0	(Myanmar) Yangon United	

=== Junior Lions ===
- The following players were called up for the 2023 MNL-2 preliminary squad.
- Match dates: 24 April – 16 September 2023
- Names in italics denote players who have been capped for the senior team.

Note: Flags indicate national team as defined under FIFA eligibility rules; some limited exceptions apply. Players may hold more than one non-FIFA nationality.

No.	Pos.	Nation	Player
1	GK	MYA	Min Myat Noe
18	GK	MYA	Sai Swan Khun Khay
28	GK	MYA	Sai Thiha Naing
32	GK	MYA	Khun Kyaw Kham

No.	Pos.	Nation	Player
2	DF	MYA	Thet Naing Oo
3	DF	MYA	Myat Phone Khant
4	DF	MYA	Lin Htet Oo
5	DF	MYA	Hla Tun
15	DF	MYA	Han Htet Oo
16	DF	MYA	Samuel Ngai Kee
21	DF	MYA	Han Tun Zaw
23	DF	MYA	Khun Choo Htoo
24	DF	MYA	Thura Zaw
26	DF	MYA	Khant Zin Hein
27	DF	MYA	Salai Ann Bwe Maung
29	DF	MYA	Kaung Khant Zaw

No.	Pos.	Nation	Player
8	MF	MYA	Brang Don Le
12	MF	MYA	Wunna Hlaing Shain
13	MF	MYA	Hein Zaw Naing
14	MF	MYA	Myo Min Khant
17	MF	MYA	Kaung Htet
19	MF	MYA	Pyae Phyo Kyaw
20	MF	MYA	Saw Hla Myo Tun

No.	Pos.	Nation	Player
6	FW	MYA	Pyae Phyo Kyaw
7	FW	MYA	Aung Kaung Khant
9	FW	MYA	Shine Wunna Aung
10	FW	MYA	Pyae Sone Aung
11	FW	MYA	Win Ko Htay
25	FW	MYA	Wai Yan Shine
30	FW	MYA	Sitt Paing Tun

=== Previous squads ===
FIFA U-20 World Cup

- 2015 FIFA U-20 World Cup squad

AFC U-19 Championship

- 2014 AFC U-19 Championship squad

== Recent results and forthcoming fixtures ==
=== 2026 ===
31 August AFC Asia cup U20	Myanmar	4–0	Sri Lanka	Yangon, Myanmar
--:-- UTC+6:30	Sai Bo Bo Kyaw 18'; Kaung Khant Kyaw 27', 39'; Sai Zom Shang 86'	Report		Stadium: Thuwunna Stadium; Referee: Venkatesh Ramachandran (India)

3 September AFC U20 Asian Cup	Brunei	0–7	Myanmar	Yangon, Myanmar
--:-- UTC+6:30		Report	Aung Thi Ha 24'; Thura Min Thant 37'; Danial 72' (o.g.); Thaw Zin Ko 74', 84'; Sai Bo Bo Kyaw 81'; Kyaw Nyi Nyi 82'	Stadium: Thuwunna Stadium; Referee: Ahmad Yacoub Ibrahim (Jordan)

6 September AFC Asia cup U20	Myanmar	6–0	Maldives	Yangon, Myanmar
--:-- UTC+6:30	Thaw Zin Ko 10'; Thura Min Thant 21', 53'; Imran 57' (o.g.); Kaung Khant Kyaw 71'; Swan Zar Ni 86'	Report		Stadium: Thuwunna Stadium; Referee: Venkatesh Ramachandran (India)

== Head-to-head record ==
The following table shows Myanmar's head-to-head record in the FIFA U-20 World Cup, AFC U-20 Asian Cup

=== In FIFA U-20 World Cup ===
Positive Record

Neutral Record Negative Record

Opponent	Pld	W	D	L	GF	GA	GD	Win %
Ukraine	1	0	0	1	0	6	−6	0.00
New Zealand	1	0	0	1	1	5	−4	0.00
United States	1	0	0	1	1	2	−1	0.00
Total	3	0	0	3	2	13	−11	0.00

=== In AFC U-20 Asian Cup ===
Positive Record

Neutral Record Negative Record

Opponent	Pld	W	D	L	GF	GA	GD	Win %
Taiwan	6	5	1	0	19	5	+14	83.33
Philippines	4	4	0	0	33	2	+31	100.00
Singapore	5	5	0	0	27	6	+21	100.00
Sri Lanka	4	4	0	0	22	7	+15	100.00
Thailand	9	7	1	1	20	7	+13	77.78
Malaysia	10	6	2	2	22	12	+10	60.00
Vietnam	5	4	0	1	18	2	+16	80.00
Japan	7	5	0	2	17	8	+9	71.43
Hong Kong	5	3	1	1	13	2	+11	60.00
Indonesia	5	3	1	1	9	3	+6	60.00
India	8	4	2	2	9	7	+2	50.00
Cambodia	2	2	0	0	9	0	+9	100.00
South Korea	4	1	2	1	5	4	+1	25.00
Israel	8	2	3	3	4	9	−5	25.00
Nepal	1	1	0	0	5	0	+5	100.00
Iran	2	0	0	2	0	4	−4	0.00
Pakistan	1	1	0	0	3	0	+3	100.00
Saudi Arabia	1	1	0	0	2	0	+2	100.00
Laos	1	1	0	0	2	1	+1	100.00
North Korea	1	0	0	1	1	2	−1	0.00
Yemen	2	0	2	0	1	1	+0	0.00
Iraq	1	0	0	1	0	2	−2	0.00
United Arab Emirates	1	1	0	0	1	0	+1	100.00
Qatar	1	0	0	1	2	3	−1	0.00
Total	94	60	15	19	235	87	+148	63.83

== Honours ==
=== International ===
- FIFA U20 World Cup
  - Group stage (1): 2015

=== Continental ===
- AFC Youth Championship

- Winners (7): 1961, 1963, 1964, 1966, 1968, 1969, 1970

- Runners-up (1): 1965
- Third place (2): 1967, 1971

  - Semi-finalist (1): 2014

=== Regional ===
- AFF U19 Youth Championship

- Winners (2):2003, 2005

- Runners-up (2): 2002, 2018

=== Other awards ===
- Hassanal Bolkiah Trophy
  - Champion (1): 2014
  - Runners-up (2): 2005, 2007
  - Semi-finalist (3): 2002, 2012, 2018
- International U-21 Thanh Niên Newspaper Cup
  - Runners-up (1): 2018
  - Third place (1): 2017
