= 2005 Hassanal Bolkiah Trophy =

Tournament details
- Host country: Brunei
- Dates: 12–25 March
- Teams: 9
- Venues: 3 (in 1 host city)

Final positions
- Champions: Thailand (1st title)
- Runners-up: Myanmar
- Third place: Vietnam; Laos (shared)

Tournament statistics
- Matches played: 19
- Goals scored: 55 (2.89 per match)

The 2005 Hassanal Bolkiah Trophy is the second edition of the invitational tournament hosted by Brunei. The tournament take place in Brunei from 12–25 March 2005. Nine teams from the ASEAN Football Federation participate in the tournament for under the age of 22.

Thailand emerged as the champion after beating Myanmar by 3–0 in the final, while both Vietnam and Laos shared the third place.

== Venues ==
Hassanal Bolkiah National Stadium	Berakas Sports Complex	Track & Field Sports Complex
4°55′44″N 114°56′42″E	4.9369°N 114.9400°E	4.9312280°N 114.9470584°E
Capacity: 30,000	Capacity: 5,000	Capacity: 1,700

== Group stage ==
- All times are Brunei Darussalam Time (BNT) – UTC+8.

=== Tie-breaking criteria ===
The teams are ranked according to points (3 points for a win, 1 point for a tie, 0 points for a loss) and tie breakers are in following order:

1. Greater number of points obtained in the group matches between the teams concerned;
2. Goal difference resulting from the group matches between the teams concerned;
3. Greater number of goals scored in the group matches between the teams concerned;
4. Result of direct matches;
5. Drawing of lots.

=== Group A ===
Team	Pld	W	D	L	GF	GA	GD	Pts
Thailand	4	3	1	0	7	1	+6	10
Vietnam	4	2	1	1	6	2	+4	7
Malaysia	4	2	0	2	5	7	−2	6
Indonesia	4	1	1	2	3	4	−1	4
Philippines	4	0	1	3	1	8	−7	1

13 March
16:00 UTC+8

Philippines	1 – 2	Malaysia
Prochnow 53' (pen.)	Report	Safiq 45'; Zaquan Adha 52'

Berakas Sports Complex, B. S. Begawan
13 March
16:00 UTC+8

Thailand	1 – 0	Vietnam
Preecha 45'	Report

Track & Field Sports Complex, B. S. Begawan

15 March
16:00 UTC+8

Thailand	0 – 0	Philippines

Berakas Sports Complex, B. S. Begawan
15 March
16:00 UTC+8

Vietnam	0 – 0	Indonesia

Track & Field Sports Complex, B. S. Begawan

17 March
16:00 UTC+8

Philippines	0 – 4	Vietnam
	Report	Phạm Thanh Nguyên 26', 44'; Lực Hồng Quân 74'; Bùi Văn Hà 90'

Berakas Sports Complex, B. S. Begawan
17 March
16:00 UTC+8

Malaysia	2 – 0	Indonesia
Sabre 60'; Aidil Zafuan 90+7'	Report

Track & Field Sports Complex, B. S. Begawan

19 March
16:00 UTC+8

Indonesia	2 – 0	Philippines
Ahmad Zaelani 9', 10'

Hassanal Bolkiah National Stadium, B. S. Begawan
19 March
20:00 UTC+8

Malaysia	0 – 4	Thailand
	Report	Preecha 13', 69'; Olan 44'; Yazzman Irffan 59' (o.g.)

Hassanal Bolkiah National Stadium, B. S. Begawan

21 March
16:00 UTC+8

Vietnam	2 – 1	Malaysia
Trần Đức Dương 34', 86'	Report	Syam Shahril 62'

Hassanal Bolkiah National Stadium, B. S. Begawan
21 March
20:00 UTC+8

Indonesia	1 – 2	Thailand
Ahmad Zaelani 22'	Report	Kittipol 25'; Preecha 64'

Hassanal Bolkiah National Stadium, B. S. Begawan

=== Group B ===
Team	Pld	W	D	L	GF	GA	GD	Pts
Myanmar	3	2	0	1	13	2	+11	6
Laos	3	2	0	1	4	3	+1	6
Brunei	3	2	0	1	4	7	−3	6
Singapore	3	0	0	3	2	11	−9	0

12 March
16:00 UTC+8

Myanmar	6 – 0	Singapore
Yan Paing 5'; Mar La 8', 89'; Khin Maung Tun; Kyaw Thu Ra; Soe Lin Tun 90'	Report

Berakas Sports Complex, B. S. Begawan
12 March
20:45 UTC+8

Brunei	1 – 0	Laos
Shah Razen 90'	Report

Hassanal Bolkiah National Stadium, B. S. Begawan

14 March
16:00 UTC+8

Singapore	1 – 2	Laos
Zulkiffli 57'	Report	Dalaphone 45' (pen.); Phanthaya 90'

Track & Field Sports Complex, B. S. Begawan

16 March
16:00 UTC+8

Myanmar	6 – 0	Brunei
Yan Paing 23', 68'; Zaw Zaw 47'; Mar La 77'; Sun Day Thein 81', 87'	Report

Track & Field Sports Complex, B. S. Begawan

18 March
16:00 UTC+8

Laos	2 – 1	Myanmar
Xaysongkham 26'; Phaphouvanin 55'	Report	Sun Day Thein 23'

Track & Field Sports Complex, B. S. Begawan

20 March
16:00 UTC+8

Brunei	3 – 1	Singapore
Khairul Anwar 65'; Hardi 75', 78'	Report	Helmi 12'

Hassanal Bolkiah National Stadium, B. S. Begawan

== Knockout stage ==
Semi-finals
23 March – B. S. Begawan
Thailand	3
Laos	2
23 March – B. S. Begawan
Myanmar	2
Vietnam	0

Final
25 March – B. S. Begawan
Thailand	3
Myanmar	0

=== Semi-finals ===
23 March
16:00 UTC+8

Thailand	3 – 2	Laos
Sarawut 20'; Preecha 50'; Banluesak 95'	Report	Xaysongkham 19'; Phothilath 90'

Hassanal Bolkiah National Stadium, B. S. Begawan
23 March
20:00 UTC+8

Myanmar	2 – 0	Vietnam
Zaw Zaw 22'; Myo Min Tun 84'	Report

Hassanal Bolkiah National Stadium, B. S. Begawan

=== Final ===
25 March 2005
20:30 UTC+8

Thailand	3 – 0	Myanmar
Olan 1'; Preecha 25', 35'	Report

Hassanal Bolkiah National Stadium

Thailand
Myanmar

Thailand:
GK	1	Sayomphu Iatphun	(yellow card) 70'
DF	5	Prat Samakrat	(yellow card) 82'
DF	6	Kiatprawut Saiwaeo	(yellow card) 37' (yellow-red card) 86'
DF	12	Weerayut Jitkuntod
DF	23	Natthaphong Samana
MF	7	Kittipol Paphunga (c)	(substituted off) 45'
MF	8	Atthipol Poolsap
MF	14	Wittawat Sichean
MF	20	Olan Linsamphansanti	1' (substituted off) 88'
FW	10	Preecha Chaokla	25', 35' (yellow card) 49' (substituted off) 72'
FW	11	Ekaphan Inthasen	(yellow card) 36'
Substitutes:
GK	18	Chalermkiat Sombutpan
DF	16	Weerayut Kamporn
DF	19	Jeera Jarernsuk
MF	15	Sarawut Janthapan	(substituted on) 45'
MF	17	Anu Singharach
MF	24	Thada Thongthuam	(substituted on) 88'
FW	9	Banluesak Yodyingyong	(substituted on) 72'
Coach:
(Thailand) Phayong Khunnaen

Myanmar:
GK	1	Phyo Min Maung
DF	2	Win Min Htut
DF	3	Moe Win	(yellow card) 40'
DF	5	Kyaw Khing Win
DF	6	Aung Tun Lin	(substituted off) 56'
MF	7	Zaw Zaw	(substituted off) 63'
MF	8	Khin Maung Tun
MF	12	Bo Bo Aung
MF	14	Myo Min Tun	(yellow card) 68'
FW	10	Yan Paing (c)	(yellow card) 86'
FW	11	Mar La	(substituted off) 68'
Substitutes:
GK	18	Kyaw Min Hlaing
DF	13	Kyaw Zin Win
DF	16	Zaw Htet Aung	(substituted on) 69'
MF	17	Soe Lin Tun	(substituted on) 58'
FW	4	Min Min Tun
FW	9	Sun Day Thein	(substituted on) 68' (red card) 90'
FW	15	Kyaw Thu Ra	(substituted on) 63'
Coach:
(Bulgaria) Ivan Kolev

2005 Hassanal Bolkiah Trophy
(Thailand)
Thailand
First title

== Goalscorers ==
7 goals

- (Thailand) Preecha Chaokla

3 goals

- (Indonesia) Ahmad Zaelani
- (Myanmar) Mar La
- (Myanmar) Sun Day Thein
- (Myanmar) Yan Paing

2 goals

- (Brunei) Hardi Bujang
- (Laos) Sounthalay Xaysongkham
- (Myanmar) Zaw Zaw
- (Thailand) Olan Linsamphansanti
- (Vietnam) Phạm Thanh Nguyên
- (Vietnam) Trần Đức Dương

1 goal

- (Brunei) Khairol Anwar Yaakub
- (Brunei) Shah Razen Said
- (Laos) Valasine Dalaphone
- (Laos) Soulikhan Phantaya
- (Laos) Visay Phaphouvanin
- (Laos) Vilasack Phothilath
- (Malaysia) Aidil Zafuan Abdul Radzak
- (Malaysia) Sabre Mat Abu
- (Malaysia) Safiq Rahim
- (Malaysia) Syam Shahril Ghulam
- (Malaysia) Zaquan Adha Abdul Radzak
- (Myanmar) Khin Maung Tun
- (Myanmar) Kyaw Thu Ra
- (Myanmar) Myo Min Tun
- (Myanmar) Soe Lin Tun
- (Philippines) Sarcha Prochnow
- (Singapore) Helmi Mohammad
- (Singapore) Zulkiffli Hassim
- (Thailand) Banluesak Yodyingyong
- (Thailand) Kittipol Paphunga
- (Thailand) Sarawut Janthapan
- (Vietnam) Bùi Văn Hà
- (Vietnam) Lực Hồng Quân

Own goals

- (Malaysia) Yazzman Irffan Yahya (for Thailand)

== Team statistics ==
As per statistical convention in football, matches decided in extra time are counted as wins and losses, while matches decided by penalty shoot-outs are counted as draws.

Pos	Team	Pld	W	D	L	GF	GA	GD
1	Thailand	6	5	1	0	13	3	+10
2	Myanmar	5	3	0	2	15	5	+10
3	Vietnam	5	2	1	2	4	3	+1
3	Laos	4	2	0	2	6	7	–1
3 Pld
#	Brunei	3	2	0	1	4	7	–3
#	Singapore	3	0	0	3	2	11	–9
4 Pld
#	Malaysia	4	2	0	2	3	7	–4
#	Indonesia	4	1	1	2	3	4	–1
#	Philippines	4	0	1	3	1	8	–7
