= Myanmar national under-19 football team =

Myanmar U19
- Nickname: Chinthe
- Association: Myanmar Football Federation
- Confederation: AFC (Asia)
- Sub-confederation: AFF (Southeast Asia)
- Head coach: Ryuji Sueoka
- FIFA code: MYA
First colours	Second colours

AFC U-19 Championship
- Appearances: 19 (first in 1959)
- Best result: Winners (1961, 1963, 1964, 1966, 1968, 1969, 1970)

== International records ==
=== AFC U-19 Championship ===
AFC Youth Championship
Year	Result	Pld	W	D	L	GF	GA	squad
(Federation of Malaya) 1959	Group stage	4	3	1	0	24	11	
(Federation of Malaya) 1960	Group stage	3	1	0	2	10	7	
(Thailand) 1961	Champions*	5	3	2	0	13	8	
(Thailand) 1962	Group stage	4	1	0	3	1	8	
(Federation of Malaya) 1963	Champions*	6	4	2	0	17	5	
(South Vietnam) 1964	Champions*	4	2	1	1	8	3	
(Japan) 1965	Runners-up	6	5	0	1	13	6	
(Philippines) 1966	Champions*	7	5	1	1	23	4	
(Thailand) 1967	Third Place	6	5	0	1	14	1	
(South Korea) 1968	Champions	7	6	1	0	23	3	
(Thailand) 1969	Champions*	6	4	2	0	22	6	
(Philippines) 1970	Champions	6	5	0	1	15	1	
(Japan) 1971	Third Place	6	4	1	1	16	2	
(Thailand) 1972	Quarterfinals	4	3	0	1	12	2	
(Iran) 1973	Quarterfinals	4	3	0	1	8	3	
(Thailand) 1974	Group Stage	3	1	1	1	2	2	
(Kuwait) 1975	Group stage	4	1	2	1	4	4	
(Thailand) 1976	Quarter-finals	4	2	0	2	11	3	
(Iran) 1977 to (Thailand) 1998	DNP							
(Iran) 2000 to (United Arab Emirates) 2012	DNQ							
(Myanmar) 2014	Semi-finals^{1}	5	2	1	2	6	5	squad
(Bahrain) 2016 to (Uzbekistan) 2020	DNQ							
Total	Best: Champions	94	60	15	19	242	84	

- Champions* : Title shared
- DNP : Did Not Participate
- DNQ : Did not qualify
^{1} No third place playoff.

=== AFF U19 Youth Championship ===
AFF U19 Youth Championship
Year	Round	GP	W	D	L	GF	GA
(Thailand) (Cambodia) 2002	Runners-up	6	3	1	2	12	8
(Indonesia) 2005	Champions	6	5	0	1	11	6
(Malaysia) 2006	Did not enter	-	-	-	-	-	-
(Vietnam) 2007	Fourth Place	5	3	0	2	9	7
(Thailand) 2008	Did not enter	-	-	-	-	-	-
(Vietnam) 2009	Group stage	3	1	0	2	4	5
(Vietnam) 2010	Did not enter	-	-	-	-	-	-
(Myanmar) 2011	Fourth Place	6	3	1	2	10	2
(Vietnam) 2012	Did not enter	-	-	-	-	-	-
(Indonesia) 2013	Group stage	5	1	2	2	13	10
(Vietnam) 2014	Fourth Place	4	2	0	2	6	6
(Laos) 2015	Group stage	4	2	1	1	3	3
(Vietnam) 2016	Group stage	5	2	2	1	11	10
(Myanmar) 2017	Fourth Place	6	3	1	2	18	10
(Indonesia) 2018	Runners-up	6	3	1	2	17	9
(Vietnam) 2019	Fourth Place	7	4	1	2	12	10
(Indonesia) 2022	Group stage	5	2	0	3	12	12
Total	Best: Champions	68	34	10	24	136	98

- The under-20 national team played at the 2002 to 2007 editions

== Results and fixtures – Myanmar U-19 ==
Win Draw Loss

=== Group A ===
Team	Pld	W	D	L	GF	GA	GD	Pts
Thailand	3	2	0	1	5	6	−1	6
Myanmar	3	1	1	1	3	2	+1	4
Yemen	3	1	1	1	3	3	0	4
Iran	3	1	0	2	3	3	0	3

9 October 2014
15:30

Iran	1–2	Thailand
Mazloum 15'	Report	Thanasit 65'; Chenrop 82'

Thuwunna Stadium, Yangon
Attendance: 2,850
Referee: Abdulrahman Abdou (Qatar)
9 October 2014
18:30

Myanmar	0–0	Yemen
	Report

Thuwunna Stadium, Yangon
Attendance: 13,142
Referee: Ryuji Sato (Japan)

11 October 2014
15:30

Yemen	1–0	Iran
Al-Sarori 6'	Report

Thuwunna Stadium, Yangon
Attendance: 24,568
Referee: Mohd Amirul Izwan Bin Yaacob (Malaysia)
11 October 2014
18:30

Thailand	0–3	Myanmar
	Report	Nyein Chan Aung 13', 18'; Aung Thu 42'

Thuwunna Stadium, Yangon
Attendance: 24,568
Referee: Nawaf Shukralla (Bahrain)

13 October 2014
18:30

Myanmar	0–2	Iran
	Report	Seyyedi 56'; Moharrami 83'

Thuwunna Stadium, Yangon
Attendance: 19,784
Referee: Abdullah Al Hilali (Oman)
13 October 2014
18:30

Thailand	3–2	Yemen
Patiphan 40', 85', 88'	Report	K. Mahdi 1'; Mohammed 64'

Wunna Theikdi Stadium, Nay Pyi Taw
Attendance: 600
Referee: Strebre Delovski (Australia)

All times are in Myanmar Summer Time (Myanmar Daylight Time, IDT), although the 2014 AFC U-19 Asian Cup is entirely held at Myanmar.

=== Knockout stage ===
In the knockout stage, extra time and penalty shoot-out are used to decide the winner if necessary.

Quarter-finals
17 October 2014
Thailand	1
Uzbekistan	2
17 October 2014
Japan	1 (4)
North Korea (p)	1 (5)
17 October 2014
United Arab Emirates	0
Myanmar	1
17 October 2014
Qatar	4
China	2

Semi-finals
20 October 2014
Uzbekistan	0
North Korea	5
20 October 2014
Myanmar	2
Qatar (a.e.t.)	3

Final
23 October 2014
North Korea	0
Qatar	1

=== Quarter-finals ===
Winners qualified for 2015 FIFA U-20 World Cup.

17 October 2014
19:00

Thailand	1–2	Uzbekistan
Chenrop 48'	Report	Urinboev 6', 20'

Thuwunna Stadium, Yangon
Attendance: 29,000
Referee: Abdulrahman Abdou (Qatar)

17 October 2014
15:30

United Arab Emirates	0–1	Myanmar
	Report	Than Paing 53'

Thuwunna Stadium, Yangon
Attendance: 29,000
Referee: Ryuji Sato (Japan)

17 October 2014
15:30

Japan	1–1 (a.e.t.)	North Korea
Minamino 83' (pen.)	Report	Kim Kuk-chol 36'
Penalties
Mochizuki (penalty scored); Sakai (penalty scored); Ideguchi (penalty scored); Nakatani (penalty scored); Minamino (penalty missed)	4–5	(penalty scored) Kang Nam-gwon; (penalty scored) Ri Un-chol; (penalty scored) Min Hyo-song; (penalty scored) Jon Kum-dong; (penalty scored) Jo Sol-song

Wunna Theikdi Stadium, Nay Pyi Taw
Attendance: 400
Referee: Fahad Al-Mirdasi (Saudi Arabia)

17 October 2014
19:00

Qatar	4–2	China
Al Saadi 6'; Afif 45+5' (pen.); Moein 58'; Ali 90+6'	Report	Gui Hong 54'; Wei Jingzong 86' (pen.)

Wunna Theikdi Stadium, Nay Pyi Taw
Attendance: 400
Referee: Ravshan Irmatov (Uzbekistan)

=== Semi-finals ===
20 October 2014
15:30

Uzbekistan	0–5	North Korea
	Report	Jo Kwang-myong 5', 39', 63'; Kim Yu-song 70'; So Jong-hyok 73'

Thuwunna Stadium, Yangon
Attendance: 29,870
Referee: Abdulla Hassan Mohamed (United Arab Emirates)

20 October 2014
19:00

Myanmar	2–3 (a.e.t.)	Qatar
Aung Thu 62'; Nyein Chan Aung 64'	Report	Ali 45+1'; Afif 75'; Thiam 90+2'

Thuwunna Stadium, Yangon
Attendance: 29,870
Referee: Mohd Amirul Izwan Bin Yaacob (Malaysia)

=== Final ===
23 October 2014
19:00

North Korea	0–1	Qatar
	Report	Afif 52'

Thuwunna Stadium, Yangon
Attendance: 2,375
Referee: Abdullah Al Hilali (Oman)

== Current coaching staff ==
Position	Name
Head of Delegation	(Myanmar) Ye Win Aung
Head coach	(Japan) Ryuji Sueoka
Assistant coach	(Myanmar) Bo Bo Aung (Myanmar) Lin Lin Htwe
Goalkeeping coach	(Japan) Tetsuya Higashi
Doctor	(Myanmar) Phyo Min Oo
Physiotherapist	(Myanmar) Htun Zaw
Media officer	(Myanmar) Bo Min

== Players ==
=== Current squad ===
- The following players were called up for the 2024 ASEAN U-19 Boys Championship..
- Match dates: 17-31 July 2024
- Caps and goals correct as of: 29 June 2022
- Names in italics denote players who have been capped for the senior team.

No.	Pos.	Player	Date of birth (age)	Caps	Goals	Club
	GK	Han Myint Myat Tun	19 November 2005 (age 20)	0	0	(Myanmar Football Federation) Mahar United
	GK	Saw Kyaw Khant Noe		0	0	(Myanmar Football Federation) Ayeyawady United
	GK	Saw Ex Do Htoo		0	0	(Myanmar Football Federation) Dagon Port
	DF	Tun Tun Thein	3 December 2005 (age 20)	9	0	(Myanmar Football Federation) Dagon Port
	DF	Khant Zin Hein	18 April 2005 (age 21)	6	0	(Myanmar Football Federation) Mahar United
	DF	Ye Kaung Satt	20 January 2005 (age 21)	4	0	(Myanmar Football Federation) Thitsar Arman
	DF	Lat Wai Bhone	4 May 2005 (age 21)	3	0	(Myanmar Football Federation) Hantharwaddy
	DF	Phyo Pyae Sone	28 June 2005 (age 21)	0	0	(Myanmar Football Federation) Yangon United
	DF	Samuel Ngai Kee		0	0	(Myanmar Football Federation) Yadanarbon
	DF	Khun Cho Htoo	17 July 2006 (age 20)	0	0	(Myanmar Football Federation) Yangon United U20
	DF	Hlwan Htet Tun	23 June 2005 (age 21)	0	0	(Myanmar Football Federation) Yangon United U20
	MF	Zaw Myo Tun		0	0	(Myanmar Football Federation) Dagon Star United
	MF	Kaung Khant Kyaw	26 February 2007 (age 19)	0	0	(Myanmar Football Federation) Yangon United U20
	MF	Min Maw Oo	6 March 2005 (age 21)	0	0	(Myanmar Football Federation) Thitsar Arman
	MF	Naing Aung Sann		0	0	(Myanmar Football Federation) Dagon Port
	MF	Saw Lin Htet Paing		0	0	(Myanmar Football Federation) Rakhine United
	FW	Swan Htet	12 April 2005 (age 21)	7	2	(Myanmar Football Federation) Dagon Star
	FW	Zwe Manthar	1 June 2005 (age 21)	0	0	(Myanmar Football Federation) Hantharwaddy
	FW	Win Pyae Maung	23 February 2006 (age 20)	0	0	(Myanmar Football Federation) ISPE
	FW	Saw Hser Ka'paw Say	26 May 2005 (age 21)	0	0	(Myanmar Football Federation) ISPE
	FW	Naing Win Tun	15 November 2005 (age 20)	0	0	(Myanmar Football Federation) Thitsar Arman
	FW	Shine Wunna Aung	15 March 2006 (age 20)	0	0	(Myanmar Football Federation) Thitsar Arman
	FW	Win Ko Htay	2 August 2005 (age 21)	0	0	(Myanmar Football Federation) Mahar United

=== Recent call-ups ===
Pos.	Player	Date of birth (age)	Caps	Goals	Club	Latest call-up

== Head-to-head record ==
The following table shows Myanmar's head-to-head record in the AFC U-20 Asian Cup

=== In AFC U-20 Asian Cup ===
Positive Record

Neutral Record Negative Record

Opponent	Pld	W	D	L	GF	GA	GD	Win %
Taiwan	6	5	1	0	19	5	+14	83.33
Philippines	4	4	0	0	33	2	+31	100.00
Singapore	5	5	0	0	27	6	+21	100.00
Sri Lanka	4	4	0	0	22	7	+15	100.00
Thailand	9	7	1	1	20	7	+13	77.78
Malaysia	10	6	2	2	22	12	+10	60.00
Vietnam	5	4	0	1	18	2	+16	80.00
Japan	7	5	0	2	17	8	+9	71.43
Hong Kong	5	3	1	1	13	2	+11	60.00
Indonesia	5	3	1	1	9	3	+6	60.00
India	8	4	2	2	9	7	+2	50.00
Cambodia	2	2	0	0	9	0	+9	100.00
South Korea	4	1	2	1	5	4	+1	25.00
Israel	8	2	3	3	4	9	−5	25.00
Nepal	1	1	0	0	5	0	+5	100.00
Iran	2	0	0	2	0	4	−4	0.00
Pakistan	1	1	0	0	3	0	+3	100.00
Saudi Arabia	1	1	0	0	2	0	+2	100.00
Laos	1	1	0	0	2	1	+1	100.00
North Korea	1	0	0	1	1	2	−1	0.00
Yemen	2	0	2	0	1	1	+0	0.00
Iraq	1	0	0	1	0	2	−2	0.00
United Arab Emirates	1	1	0	0	1	0	+1	100.00
Qatar	1	0	0	1	2	3	−1	0.00
Total	94	60	15	19	235	87	+148	63.83

== Honours ==
=== Regional ===
- AFF U19 Youth Championship

- Winners (1): 2005

- Runners-up (1): 2002, 2018

=== Invitation ===
- Hassanal Bolkiah Trophy
  - Winners (1): 2014
- Jockey Club International U18 Youth Football Tournament
  - Winners (1): 2019
- BIDC Cup
  - Winners (1): 2011
  - Runners-up (1): 2013
- Jenesys Japan-Asean U19 International Football Tournament
  - Third Place (1): 2020
- CTFA U19 International Football Tournament
  - Runners-up (1): 2019
- BTV Cup
  - Third Place (1): 2019 BTV Cup
