= 2002 Hassanal Bolkiah Trophy =

Tournament details
- Host country: Brunei
- Dates: 16 – 26 August
- Teams: 10
- Venues: 2 (in 1 host city)

Final positions
- Champions: Indonesia (1st title)
- Runners-up: Thailand
- Third place: Myanmar; Malaysia (shared)

Tournament statistics
- Matches played: 23
- Goals scored: 83 (3.61 per match)

The 2002 Hassanal Bolkiah Trophy is the first edition of the invitational tournament hosted by Brunei. The tournament take place in Brunei from 16 to 26 August 2002. Ten teams from the ASEAN Football Federation participate in the tournament for under the age of 22.

Indonesia emerged as the champion after beating Thailand by 2–0 in the final, while both Myanmar and Malaysia shared the third place.

== Venues ==
Hassanal Bolkiah National Stadium	Track & Field Sports Complex
4°55′44″N 114°56′42″E	4.9312280°N 114.9470584°E
Capacity: 30,000	Capacity: 1,700

== Group stage ==
- All times are Brunei Darussalam Time (BNT) – UTC+8.

=== Tie-breaking criteria ===
The teams are ranked according to points (3 points for a win, 1 point for a tie, 0 points for a loss) and tie breakers are in following order:

1. Greater number of points obtained in the group matches between the teams concerned;
2. Goal difference resulting from the group matches between the teams concerned;
3. Greater number of goals scored in the group matches between the teams concerned;
4. Result of direct matches;
5. Drawing of lots.

=== Group A ===
Team	Pld	W	D	L	GF	GA	GD	Pts
Myanmar	4	4	0	0	14	0	+14	12
Malaysia	4	2	0	2	13	8	+5	6
Laos	4	2	0	2	10	7	+3	6
Brunei	4	1	1	2	4	12	−8	4
Cambodia	4	0	1	3	2	16	−14	1

16 August

Brunei	0 – 0	Cambodia
	Report

Hassanal Bolkiah National Stadium, B. S. Begawan
Attendance: <200

17 August

Laos	4 – 3	Malaysia
Phaphouvanin 6' (?); Phengsangsay (?)	Report	? 8' (o.g.) (Note: Reported by source as Khin Maung Tun who is actually a Myanmar player.); Khairul Izwan (?); Fadzli (?)

Hassanal Bolkiah National Stadium, B. S. Begawan
17 August

Myanmar	5 – 0	Brunei
Soe Myat Min 2' ? (?); Yan Paing (?), 71'; Aung Kyaw Tun 70'	Report

Hassanal Bolkiah National Stadium, B. S. Begawan

18 August

Cambodia	2 – 6	Laos
Ung (?); Phan (?)	Report	Phaphouvanin 15', 16'; Phengsangsay (?); Soumphonphady 47', 75'; Vongsamany (?)

Track & Field Sports Complex, B. S. Begawan
18 August

Malaysia	0 – 1	Myanmar
	Report	Aung Tun Naing 77'

Track & Field Sports Complex, B. S. Begawan

19 August

Cambodia	0 – 3	Malaysia
	Report	Fadzli (?); Norisham (?); Firdaus (?)

Hassanal Bolkiah National Stadium, B. S. Begawan
19 August

Brunei	1 – 0	Laos
Afindi 21' (pen.)	Report

Hassanal Bolkiah National Stadium, B. S. Begawan

21 August

Malaysia	7 – 3	Brunei
Khairul Izwan (?); Safee (?); Norisham (?); R. Surendran (?); Ghazali (?)	Report	Afindi (?); Hardyman (?); Zulkefly (?)

Hassanal Bolkiah National Stadium, B. S. Begawan
21 August

Myanmar	7 – 0	Cambodia
Lwin Oo 25'; Tint Naing Tun Thien 30'; Zaw Zaw 33', 38', 44'; Hrwe Maung 65'; Soe Myat Min 75'	Report

Hassanal Bolkiah National Stadium, B. S. Begawan

22 August

Laos	0 – 1	Myanmar
	Report	Aung Kyaw Tun (?)

Track & Field Sports Complex, B. S. Begawan

=== Group B ===
Team	Pld	W	D	L	GF	GA	GD	Pts
Indonesia	4	4	0	0	14	0	+14	12
Thailand	4	3	0	1	9	1	+8	9
Vietnam	4	2	0	2	7	3	+4	6
Singapore	4	1	0	3	2	8	−6	3
Philippines	4	0	0	4	1	21	−20	0

16 August

Indonesia	10 – 0	Philippines
Tuasalamony 3', 23', 54', 60'; Prasetyo 45', 78'; Sucipto 50', 83'; Chaeruddin 22'; Hamka 90'	Report

Track & Field Sports Complex, B. S. Begawan

17 August

Singapore	0 – 3	Thailand
	Report	Kongpraphan 7', 51'; Chaokla 75'

Track & Field Sports Complex, B. S. Begawan
17 August

Vietnam	0 – 1	Indonesia
	Report	Tuasalamony 10'

Track & Field Sports Complex, B. S. Begawan

18 August

Philippines	0 – 1	Singapore
	Report	Zuhaili 57'

Hassanal Bolkiah National Stadium, B. S. Begawan
Referee: U Maung Maung Kyi (Myanmar)
18 August

Thailand	1 – 0	Vietnam
Kongpraphan 43'	Report

Hassanal Bolkiah National Stadium, B. S. Begawan

19 August

Indonesia	2 – 0	Singapore
Agus Indra Kurniawan 12'; Rachmat Afandi 70'	Report

Track & Field Sports Complex, B. S. Begawan
19 August

Philippines	0 – 5	Thailand
	Report	Kongpraphan 8', 22', 58'; Vanna 30'; Samana 45+2'

Track & Field Sports Complex, B. S. Begawan

21 August

Thailand	0 – 1	Indonesia
		Afandi 62'

Track & Field Sports Complex, B. S. Begawan
21 August

Vietnam	5 – 1	Philippines

Track & Field Sports Complex, B. S. Begawan

22 August

Singapore	0 – 2	Vietnam
	Report	Lê Quang Cường 10'; Nguyễn Ánh Cường 30'

Hassanal Bolkiah National Stadium, B. S. Begawan

== Knockout stage ==
Semi-finals
24 August – B. S. Begawan
Myanmar	2 (3)
Thailand	2 (4)
24 August – B. S. Begawan
Indonesia	1
Malaysia	0

Final
26 August – B. S. Begawan
Thailand	0
Indonesia	2

=== Semi-finals ===
24 August

Myanmar	2 – 2 (a.e.t.)	Thailand
Buathong 23'; Vanna 90+2'		Htay Aung 33'; Zaw Zaw 59'
Penalties
	3 – 4

Hassanal Bolkiah National Stadium, B. S. Begawan
24 August

Indonesia	1 – 0	Malaysia
Tuasalamony 43'

Hassanal Bolkiah National Stadium, B. S. Begawan

=== Final ===
26 August

Thailand	0 – 2	Indonesia
	Report	Prasetyo 38'; Tuasalamony 83'

Hassanal Bolkiah National Stadium, B. S. Begawan

2002 Hassanal Bolkiah Trophy
(Indonesia)
Indonesia
First title

== Team statistics ==
As per statistical convention in football, matches decided in extra time are counted as wins and losses, while matches decided by penalty shoot-outs are counted as draws.

Pos	Team	Pld	W	D	L	GF	GA	GD	Pts
1	Indonesia	6	6	0	0	17	0	+17	18
2	Thailand	6	3	1	2	11	5	+6	10
3	Myanmar	5	4	1	0	16	2	+14	13
3	Malaysia	5	2	0	3	13	9	+4	6
4	Vietnam	4	2	0	2	7	3	+4	6
5	Laos	4	2	0	2	10	7	+3	6
6	Brunei	4	1	1	2	4	12	−8	4
7	Singapore	4	1	0	3	2	8	−6	3
8	Cambodia	4	0	1	3	2	16	−14	1
9	Philippines	4	0	0	4	1	21	−20	0
