= Hassanal Bolkiah Trophy =

- Official logo for Hassanal Bolkiah Trophy
- Organiser(s): National Football Association of Brunei Darussalam (NFABD) and AFF
- Founded: 2002
- Region: Southeast Asia
- Teams: Max 11, number of AFF member
- Current champions: Timor-Leste (1st title)
- Most championships: Thailand (2 titles)
- Broadcaster: Radio Televisyen Brunei (RTB)
- Website: www.hassanalbolkiahtrophy.gov.bn
- 2018 Hassanal Bolkiah Trophy

The Hassanal Bolkiah Trophy for ASEAN Youth Football Championship, is the football tournament for youth players in Southeast Asia. It was opened to football players from ASEAN member states under the age of 21 years to participate in this.

The tournament is organised by National Football Association of Brunei Darussalam in collaboration with ASEAN Football Federation. Brunei Darussalam always host for the tournament. The tournament was first launched in 2002.

The next tournament is scheduled to run in 2025, as plans for an edition in 2020 and 2022 were scrapped.

== Background ==
Back in 1997, Hassanal Bolkiah, Sultan of Brunei first mooted the idea of a football tournament among the ASEAN member states.

== Summaries ==
=== 1st Tournament in 2002 ===
In 2002 when the tournament was officially launched on 16 August 2002, all ten ASEAN member states took part in the football tournament which held from. The ten teams were divided into two groups.

In Group A, Myanmar easily topped the group with a maximum of 12 points and scoring 14 goals in their four matches without conceding a goal. Malaysia and Laos finished equal with 6 points but Malaysia had a better goal difference of 13-8 beating Laos having a better goal difference of 10-7. Meanwhile in Group B, Indonesia easily topped the group by beating the other four teams and scoring 14 goals and conceding none. In their first match, they beat the Philippines by 10-0. Thailand came in second with three wins. Philippines propped up the table losing all their games and conceding 21 goals and scoring only one goal.

In the semi-finals, Indonesia beat Malaysia by a single goal and Thailand beat Myanmar on penalties 4-3, their game ended 2-2 after extra time. The first Hassanal Bolkiah Trophy was won by Indonesia when they beat Thailand 2-0 on 26 August 2002.

=== 2nd Tournament in 2005 ===
The next Hassanal Bolkiah Trophy tournament was not held in 2004 but it was held instead in 2005 from 13 to 25 March. Cambodia did not take part and the nine teams were divided into one group of five and a second group of four teams.

In the Group A Thailand topped the group by winning three games and drawing one, while Vietnam managed to come in second by beating Malaysia 2-1 in their final group match and thus getting second place. In the smaller Group B, the final table saw Myanmar, Laos and Brunei all garnering 6 points each but Myanmar with its superior scoring record topped the table and Laos came in second but Brunei's 6-0 defeat to Myanmar meant that it has an inferior goal difference.

In the semi-finals, Myanmar beat Vietnam 2-0 and Thailand needed the extra time to beat Laos 3-2. In the final, Thailand overcame Myanmar by beating them 3-0.

=== 3rd Tournament in 2007 ===
The third Hassanal Bolkiah Trophy tournament was held two years later in 2007 from 3 to 12 March. This time round only eight ASEAN member states took part with Indonesia and Laos not being able to come. The group stage saw two groups of four teams each.

In Group A, Myanmar easily topped the group by beating the other three teams and scoring 22 goals and conceding one goal and Cambodia came second with same point with Brunei but better goal difference. In Group B, with defending champions Thailand easily beating the other three teams, the other three teams were forced to scramble for second place. It was Malaysia who took the second spot after beating Singapore 2-0 in the final group game. Singapore and Vietnam did not win a single game.

In the semi-finals both group winners easily won their matches. Thailand beating Cambodia by a 10-1 score line and Myanmar beating Malaysia 2-0. In the final Thailand and Myanmar could not beat each other as the game went into extra time. It was settled by a nail-biting penalty shootout with Thailand overcoming Myanmar by 5-4.

== Results ==
Year	Final			Semi-finals		Number of teams
Year	Champions	Score	Runners-up	Semi-finalist	Semi-finalist	Number of teams
2002; Details	Indonesia	2 – 0	Thailand	Myanmar	Malaysia	10
2005; Details	Thailand	3 – 0	Myanmar	Vietnam	Laos	9
2007; Details	Thailand	0 – 0 (5 – 4p)	Myanmar	Cambodia	Malaysia	8
2012; Details	Brunei	2 – 0	Indonesia	Myanmar	Vietnam	10
2014; Details	Myanmar	4 – 3	Vietnam	Malaysia	Thailand	11
2018; Details	Timor-Leste	1 – 0	Cambodia	Myanmar	Singapore	7

== Team performances ==
Teams	2002	2005	2007	2012	2014	2018
Brunei	GS	GS	GS	1	GS	GS
Cambodia	GS	DNP	SF	GS	GS	2
Indonesia (U-21)^{1} Indonesia (U-19)^{2}	1^{1}	GS^{1}	DNP	2^{1}	GS^{2}	DNP
Laos	GS	SF	DNP	GS	GS	GS
Malaysia (U-22)^{3} Malaysia (U-21)^{4}	SF^{3}	GS^{3}	SF^{3}	GS^{4}	SF^{4}	DNP
Myanmar; Myanmar	SF	2	2	SF	1	SF
Philippines	GS	GS	GS	GS	GS	DNP
Singapore	GS	GS	GS	GS	GS	SF
Thailand	2	1	1	WD	SF	GS
Timor-Leste (U-21)^{5} Timor-Leste (U-20)^{6}	DNE	DNP	DNP	GS^{6}	GS^{6}	1^{5}
Vietnam (U-21)^{7} Vietnam (U-19)^{8}	GS	SF	GS^{7}	SF	2^{8}	DNP
Total participating teams	10	9	8	10	11	7

Keynotes:

DNP = Did not participate
DNE = Did not enter (was part of Indonesia)
GS = Group Stage
SF = Semi-finals

1. Indonesia used U-21 players on this season.
2. Indonesia used U-19 players on this season.
3. Malaysia used U-22 players on this season.
4. Malaysia used U-21 players on this season.
5. Timor-Leste used U-21 players on this season.
6. Timor-Leste used U-20 players on this season.
7. Vietnam used U-21 players on this season.
8. Vietnam used U-19 players on this season.

=== Medal table ===
Teams	Champions	Runners-up
Thailand	2 (2005, 2007)	1 (2002)
Myanmar	1 (2014)	2 (2005, 2007)
Indonesia	1 (2002)	1 (2012)
Brunei	1 (2012)	
Timor-Leste	1 (2018)	
Vietnam		1 (2014)
Cambodia		1 (2018)
