= Hardyman Lamit =

Bruneian footballer

Personal information
- Full name: Muhammad Hardyman bin Abdul Lamit
- Date of birth: 19 June 1986 (age 40)
- Place of birth: Brunei
- Position: Midfielder

Senior career*
Years	Team	Apps	(Gls)
2002	NBT		
2003–2014	QAF		
2015–2017	Jerudong		
2017–2018	Kota Ranger		
2023	Kota Ranger	0	(0)

International career^{‡}
2002–2005	Brunei U21		
2003–2009	Brunei	10	(0)
- * Club domestic league appearances and goals as of 7 March 2024 ‡ National team caps and goals as of 23 January 2017

Muhammad Hardyman bin Abdul Lamit is a Bruneian former footballer who played as a midfielder. He has represented Brunei in football and also in futsal.

== Club career ==
Hardyman previously played for QAF FC ever since their entry into the B-League back in 2003. He won the Bruneian championship three times in a row with QAF, along with two League Cups and two Super Cups. When the club declined to continue playing in the Brunei Super League in 2015, he transferred to Jerudong FC along with many of his QAF teammates, finishing sixth in the table that year.

Hardyman stayed with Jerudong FC in 2016 after the club suffered a mass exodus of players. He eventually was appointed club captain. He scored against Tabuan U21 on 9 April in a 2–2 draw to help his team gain their first point of the season.

Hardyman played with Kota Ranger FC in the 2017–18 season and finished second in the league behind MS ABDB. After seeming to have retired from the game after 2019, he made a comeback to play for the Rangers again in early 2023.

== International career ==
Hardyman made appearances for the Brunei under-21s in the first two Hassanal Bolkiah Trophy tournaments in 2002 and 2005.

Hardyman made his international debut for Brunei at the 2004 AFC Asian Cup qualification match against Myanmar on 23 March 2003. He was a second-half substitute in place of Fadlin Galawat as the Wasps lost the game 5–0. He then played for Brunei while the national team was represented by his then club QAF FC in 2006 and 2009.

Hardyman was also a member of the Brunei national futsal team and represented Brunei in 2003, his first appearances were at the 2003 AFF Futsal Championship in Kuantan, Malaysia.

== Honours ==
=== Team ===
QAF FC

- Brunei Premier League (3): 2005–06, 2007–08, 2009–10
- Brunei League Cup (2): 2008, 2009

=== Individual ===
- Shell Helix B-League Young Player of the Year: 2004
