= 2014 Hassanal Bolkiah Trophy =

Tournament details
- Host country: Brunei
- Dates: 9–23 August
- Teams: 11
- Venues: 3 (in 1 host city)

Final positions
- Champions: Myanmar (1st title)
- Runners-up: Vietnam
- Third place: Malaysia; Thailand (shared)

Tournament statistics
- Matches played: 28
- Goals scored: 96 (3.43 per match)
- Top scorer(s): (Brunei) Adi Said (6 goals)

The 2014 Hassanal Bolkiah Trophy was the fifth edition of the invitational tournament hosted by Brunei. The tournament take place in Brunei from 9–23 August 2014. Eleven teams from the Asean Football Federation participate in the tournament for under the age of 22. The draw took place on 12 July 2014 at the National Football Association of Brunei Darussalam (NFABD) House. The teams are divided into two groups. Host country, Brunei, were given a chance to choose which group they wished to be drawn in. Brunei chose to be drawn in group B. Indonesia was to confirm its participation in the tournament but was not included in the initial draw. Indonesia's participation was later confirmed by the National Football Association of Brunei Darussalam on 20 July and a second draw was held on 22 July to include Indonesia. Indonesia send its U19 team.

Myanmar emerged as the champion after beating Vietnam by 4–3 in the final, while both Malaysia and Thailand shared the third place.

== Venues ==
Hassanal Bolkiah National Stadium	Berakas Sports Complex	Track & Field Sports Complex
4°55′44″N 114°56′42″E	4.9369°N 114.9400°E	4.9312280°N 114.9470584°E
Capacity: 28,000	Capacity: 5,000	Capacity: 1,700

== Match officials ==
Seven referees and eight assistants were selected for the tournament:

Number	Referee	Assistants	
1	(Brunei) Hadimin Shahbudin	(Brunei) Ali Faisal Rosli	(Brunei) Noorizam Zakaria
2	(Cambodia) Vichhika Tuy	(Indonesia) Nurhadi	
3	(Laos) Xaypaseuth Phongsanit	(Laos) Sompavanh Lounglath	
4	(Malaysia) Suhaizi Shukri	(Malaysia) Shahreen Che Omar	
5	(Philippines) Steve Supresencia	(Philippines) Jeffrey Velez	
6	(Singapore) Jansen Foo	(Singapore) Muhd Syarqawi Buhari	
7	(Thailand) Sivakorn Pu-Udom	(Myanmar) Hein Min Tun	

Match Commissioner & Referee Assessor

Match Commissioner	Referee Assessor
(Myanmar) U Tin Aung	(Vietnam) Lương Thế Tài
(Brunei) Mohd Noor Abdullah	(Myanmar) Tin Hla Aung

== Group stage ==
- All times are Brunei Darussalam Time (BNT) – UTC+8.

=== Tie-breaking criteria ===
The teams are ranked according to points (3 points for a win, 1 point for a tie, 0 points for a loss) and tie breakers are in following order:

1. Greater number of points obtained in the group matches between the teams concerned;
2. Goal difference resulting from the group matches between the teams concerned;
3. Greater number of goals scored in the group matches between the teams concerned;
4. Result of direct matches;
5. Drawing of lots.

=== Group A ===
Team	Pld	W	D	L	GF	GA	GD	Pts
Myanmar	4	4	0	0	12	6	+6	12
Thailand	4	3	0	1	12	4	+8	9
Philippines	4	1	1	2	6	8	−2	4
Laos	4	0	2	2	6	9	−3	2
Timor-Leste	4	0	1	3	3	12	−9	1

Source: HBT
8 August
20:15

Philippines	2 – 2	Laos
Porteria 42'; De Jong 76'	Report	Bounmalay 74'; Souksavanh 90+3' (pen.)

Berakas Sports Complex, B. S. Begawan
Referee: Jansen Foo (Singapore)
8 August
20:15

Myanmar	3 – 2	Thailand
Maung Maung Soe 50', 79'; Than Paing 84'	Report	Jenphob 20'; Chenrop 65'

Track & Field Sports Complex, B. S. Begawan
Referee: Suhaizi Shukri (Malaysia)

10 August
20:15

Thailand	2 – 0	Philippines
Chenrop 58'; Chaowat 90+5'	Report

Track & Field Sports Complex, B. S. Begawan
Referee: Vichhika Tuy (Cambodia)
10 August
20:15

Timor-Leste	1 – 3	Myanmar
Nataniel 84'	Report	Aung Thu 44'; Nanda Kyaw 53' (pen.); Myo Ko Tun 73'

Berakas Sports Complex, B. S. Begawan
Referee: Jansen Foo (Singapore)

12 August
20:15

Laos	2 – 3	Myanmar
Maitee 70'; Souksavanh 76'	Report	Maung Maung Soe 49'; Nyein Chan Aung 58'; Yan Naing Oo 85'

Berakas Sports Complex, B. S. Begawan
Referee: Hadimin Shahbuddin (Brunei)
12 August
20:15

Timor-Leste	0 – 5	Thailand
	Report	Montree 15'; Chenrop 33', 54'; Jenphob 63'; Prasid 81'

Hassanal Bolkiah National Stadium, B. S. Begawan
Referee: Vichhika Tuy (Cambodia)

15 August
16:00

Thailand	3 – 1	Laos
Montree 37'; Boonkerd 76'; Nopphon 87'	Report	Champathong 15'

Track & Field Sports Complex, B. S. Begawan
Referee: Suhaizi Shukri (Malaysia)
15 August
20:15

Philippines	3 – 1	Timor-Leste
Daniels 36'; Cheng 49'; Uzoka 87'	Report	Marcos 59'

Berakas Sports Complex, B. S. Begawan
Referee: Jansen Foo (Singapore)

17 August
20:15

Myanmar	3 – 1	Philippines
Nyein Chan Aung 11'; Myo Ko Tun 55'; Swan Htet Aung 89'	Report	Daniels 64'

Berakas Sports Complex, B. S. Begawan
Referee: Jansen Foo (Singapore)
17 August
20:15

Laos	1 – 1	Timor-Leste
Khochalern 15'	Report	Henrique 79'

Track & Field Sports Complex, B. S. Begawan
Referee: Hadimin Shahbuddin (Brunei)

=== Group B ===
Team	Pld	W	D	L	GF	GA	GD	Pts
Vietnam	5	3	1	1	12	5	+7	10
Malaysia	5	3	1	1	7	2	+5	10
Brunei	5	3	1	1	10	6	+4	10
Cambodia	5	3	0	2	6	6	0	9
Indonesia	5	1	1	3	9	8	+1	4
Singapore	5	0	0	5	2	19	−17	0

Source: HBT
8 August
16:00

Malaysia	0 – 0	Indonesia
	Report

Hassanal Bolkiah National Stadium, B. S. Begawan
Referee: Sivakorn Pu-Udom (Thailand)
9 August
16:00

Vietnam	4 – 0	Singapore
Tuấn Tài 18', 49'; Công Phượng 58'; Văn Toàn 81'	Report

Track & Field Sports Complex, B. S. Begawan
Referee: Steve Supresencia (Philippines)
9 August
21:00

Brunei	0 – 1	Cambodia
	Report	Vathanaka 15'

Hassanal Bolkiah National Stadium, B. S. Begawan
Referee: Xaypaseuth Phongsanit (Laos)

11 August
15:00

Singapore	1 – 3	Cambodia
Zakir 55'	Report	Vathanaka 23'; Tola 38'; Udom 43'

Track & Field Sports Complex, B. S. Begawan
Referee: Xaypaseuth Phongsanit (Laos)
11 August
19:15

Malaysia	2 – 0	Vietnam
Syawal 48'; Nurshamil 61'	Report

Berakas Sports Complex, B. S. Begawan
Referee: Steve Supresencia (Philippines)
11 August
19:15

Indonesia	1 – 3	Brunei
Ilham 74'	Report	Adi 9', 41', 44'

Hassanal Bolkiah National Stadium, B. S. Begawan
Referee: Sivakorn Pu-Udom (Thailand)

13 August
16:00

Vietnam	3 – 1	Indonesia
Xuân Trường 5'; Hồng Duy 36'; Công Phượng 45+2'	Report	Septian 81'

Hassanal Bolkiah National Stadium, B. S. Begawan
Referee: Steve Supresencia (Philippines)
13 August
20:15

Brunei	3 – 1	Singapore
Azim 2', 68'; Adi 39'	Report	Henzry 83'

Hassanal Bolkiah National Stadium, B. S. Begawan
Referee: Suhaizi Shukri (Malaysia)
13 August
20:15

Malaysia	1 – 0	Cambodia
Asri 65'	Report

Track & Field Sports Complex, B. S. Begawan
Referee: Xaypaseuth Phongsanit (Laos)

15 August
20:15

Vietnam	2 – 2	Brunei
Hồng Duy 9'; Thanh Tùng 48'	Report	Adi 34', 75'

Hassanal Bolkiah National Stadium, B. S. Begawan
Referee: Xaypaseuth Phongsanit (Laos)
16 August
16:00

Cambodia	2 – 1	Indonesia
Sovan 22'; Sokumpheak 44'	Report	Drajad 41'

Hassanal Bolkiah National Stadium, B. S. Begawan
Referee: Sivakorn Pu-Udom (Thailand)
16 August
16:00

Singapore	0 – 3	Malaysia
	Report	Igwan 8'; Ramzi 59', 80'

Track & Field Sports Complex, B. S. Begawan
Referee: Steve Supresencia (Philippines)

18 August
16:00

Singapore	0 – 6	Indonesia
	Report	Drajad 6', 12', 49', 69'; Ilham 9'; Sitanggang 85'

Hassanal Bolkiah National Stadium, B. S. Begawan
Referee: Suhaizi Shukri (Malaysia)
18 August
20:15

Brunei	2 – 1	Malaysia
Reduan 25'; Najib 82' (pen.)	Report	Azam 18'

Hassanal Bolkiah National Stadium, B. S. Begawan
Referee: Sivakorn Pu-Udom (Thailand)
18 August
20:15

Cambodia	0 – 3	Vietnam
	Report	Tuấn Tài 28', 45'; Văn Long 80'

Track & Field Sports Complex, B. S. Begawan
Referee: Steve Supresencia (Philippines)

== Knockout stage ==
Semi-finals
20 August – B. S. Begawan
Vietnam	1
Thailand	0
20 August – B. S. Begawan
Myanmar	3
Malaysia	0

Final
23 August – B. S. Begawan
Vietnam	3
Myanmar	4

=== Semi-finals ===
20 August
14:45

Myanmar	3 – 0	Malaysia
Than Paing 2'; Aung Thu 18', 34'	Report

Hassanal Bolkiah National Stadium, B. S. Begawan
Referee: Steve Supresencia (Philippines)
20 August
20:15

Vietnam	1 – 0	Thailand
Văn Sơn 71'	Report

Hassanal Bolkiah National Stadium, B. S. Begawan
Referee: Xaypaseuth Phongsanit (Laos)

=== Final ===
23 August
20:30

Vietnam	3 – 4	Myanmar
Văn Long 38'; Tuấn Tài 48'; Công Phượng 71'	Report	Myo Ko Tun 17', 58'; Maung Maung Soe 60'; Aung Thu 82'

Hassanal Bolkiah National Stadium, B. S. Begawan
Referee: Hadimin Shahbuddin (Brunei)

2014 Hassanal Bolkiah Trophy
(Myanmar)
Myanmar
First title

== Goalscorers ==
6 goals

- (Brunei) Adi Said

5 goals

- (Indonesia) Dimas Drajad
- (Vietnam) Hồ Tuấn Tài

4 goals

- (Myanmar) Aung Thu
- (Myanmar) Maung Maung Soe
- (Myanmar) Myo Ko Tun
- (Thailand) Chenrop Samphaodi

3 goals

- (Vietnam) Nguyễn Công Phượng

2 goals

- (Brunei) Abdul Azim Abdul Rashid
- (Cambodia) Chan Vathanaka
- (Indonesia) Ilham Udin Armaiyn
- (Laos) Ketsada Souksavanh
- (Malaysia) Mohd Ramzi Sufian
- (Myanmar) Nyein Chan Aung
- (Myanmar) Than Paing
- (Philippines) Kenshiro Daniels
- (Thailand) Janepob Phokhi
- (Thailand) Montree Promsawat
- (Vietnam) Nguyễn Phong Hồng Duy
- (Vietnam) Phan Văn Long

1 goal

- (Brunei) Mohd Najib Tarif
- (Brunei) Reduan Petara
- (Cambodia) Kouch Sokumpheak
- (Cambodia) Nub Tola
- (Cambodia) Prak Mony Udom
- (Cambodia) Sok Sovan
- (Indonesia) Paulo Oktavianus Sitanggang
- (Indonesia) Septian David Maulana
- (Laos) Maitee
- (Laos) Phoutthasay Khochalern
- (Laos) Tiny Bounmalay
- (Laos) Xaisongkham Champathong
- (Malaysia) Mohd Asri Mardzuki
- (Malaysia) Mohd Syawal Nordin
- (Malaysia) Muhd Nor Azam Azih
- (Malaysia) Nurshamil Abdul Ghani
- (Malaysia) Shahrul Igwan Samsudin
- (Myanmar) Nanda Kyaw
- (Myanmar) Swan Htet Aung
- (Myanmar) Yan Naing Oo
- (Philippines) Jaime Cheng
- (Philippines) Jason de Jong
- (Philippines) Kennedy Uzoka
- (Philippines) OJ Porteria
- (Singapore) Muhd Zakir Samsudin
- (Singapore) Yuz Henzry Mohd Jamil
- (Thailand) Boonkerd Chaiyasin
- (Thailand) Chaowat Veerachat
- (Thailand) Nopphon Ponkam
- (Thailand) Prasid Jantum
- (Timor-Leste) Henrique Wilsons Da Cruz Martins
- (Timor-Leste) Marcos Morais Guasmao
- (Timor-Leste) Nataniel de Jesus Reis
- (Vietnam) Hoàng Thanh Tùng
- (Vietnam) Lê Văn Sơn
- (Vietnam) Lương Xuân Trường
- (Vietnam) Nguyễn Văn Toàn

== Team statistics ==
As per statistical convention in football, matches decided in extra time are counted as wins and losses, while matches decided by penalty shoot-outs are counted as draws.

Pos	Team	Pld	W	D	L	GF	GA	GD
1	Myanmar	6	6	0	0	19	9	+10
2	Vietnam	7	4	1	2	16	9	+7
3	Malaysia	6	3	1	2	7	5	+2
3	Thailand	5	3	0	2	12	5	+7
4 Pld
#	Philippines	4	1	1	2	6	8	–2
#	Laos	4	0	2	2	6	9	–3
#	Timor-Leste	4	0	1	3	3	12	–9
5 Pld
#	Brunei	5	3	1	1	10	6	+4
#	Cambodia	5	3	0	2	6	6	0
#	Indonesia	5	1	1	3	9	8	+1
#	Singapore	5	0	0	5	2	19	–17
