= Indonesia national under-21 football team =

Indonesia U-21
- Association: PSSI (Football Association of Indonesia)
- Confederation: AFC (Asia)
- Sub-confederation: AFF (Southeast Asia)
- FIFA code: IDN

First international
- Indonesia 10–0 Philippines (Bandar Seri Begawan, Brunei; August 16, 2002)

Biggest win
- Indonesia 10–0 Philippines (Bandar Seri Begawan, Brunei; August 16, 2002)

Biggest defeat
- Mauritania 4–0 Indonesia (Alcúdia, Spain; August 11, 2014)

Indonesia national under-21 football team represents Indonesia in association football and has players aged 21 years old or under.

== Coaching history ==
Year	Head coaches	Tournaments
2002	(Indonesia) Bambang Nurdiansyah	2002 Hassanal Bolkiah Trophy – Champions
2005	(Indonesia) Zein Al Hadad	2005 Hassanal Bolkiah Trophy – Group stage
2008	(Indonesia) Bambang Nurdiansyah	2008 Indonesia Independence Cup - Third place
2012	(Indonesia) Widodo C. Putro	2012 Hassanal Bolkiah Trophy – Runners-up
2014	(Indonesia) Rudy William Keltjes	2014 COTIF – Group stage

== Competitive record ==
=== Hassanal Bolkiah Trophy ===
(Brunei) Hassanal Bolkiah Trophy
Year	Round	Position	GP	W	D	L	GS	GA
2002	Champions	1st	6	6	0	0	17	0
2005	Group stage	8th	4	1	1	2	3	4
2007	Did not participate							
2012	Runners-up	2nd	6	3	1	2	9	6
2014	Did not participate							
2018	Did not participate							
Total	Best: Champions	3/6	16	10	2	4	29	10

=== Exhibition ===
Exhibition game
Year	Tournament	Round	Position	GP	W	D	L	GS	GA
2008	Indonesia Independence Cup	Third place	3rd	4	2	0	2	4	5
2014	(Spain) COTIF	Group stage	10th	4	0	0	4	0	8

== Honours ==
=== Exhibition ===
- Hassanal Bolkiah Trophy
  - (gold) Champions (1): 2002
  - (silver) Runners-up (1): 2012
- Indonesia Independence Cup
  - (bronze) Third place (1): 2008
