= Nurul Azami Hussin =

Bruneian footballer

Ampuan Nurul Azami
Personal information
- Full name: Ampuan Mohammad Nurul Azami bin Ampuan Hussin
- Date of birth: 31 July 1985 (age 41)
- Place of birth: Brunei
- Position: Defender

Senior career*
Years	Team	Apps	(Gls)
2005–2008	DPMM		(0)
2008–2011	Majra		
2012–2014	DPMM	8	(1)
2015	Kota Ranger		(1)
2017–2018	Kota Ranger		(1)
2022	Ar Rawda		
- * Club domestic league appearances and goals as of 14 November 2025

Ampuan Mohammad Nurul Azami bin Ampuan Hussin (born 31 July 1985) is a Bruneian former footballer who played as a defender. He played professionally for Brunei DPMM FC in the Singaporean S.League, having started his career with the royalty-owned club since the days of playing in the Brunei Premier League.

== Career ==
Nurul Azami began his playing career with DPMM FC, starting out as a striker. Unable to break into the team even though he changed position to a defender, he decided to move to Majra FC from the 2007-08 Brunei Premier League season. He stayed there for 3 seasons, then was reinvited to train with DPMM who were preparing for the 2012 S.League after a two-year exile.

Nurul Azami initially failed his mandatory S.League fitness test but managed to pass it in time for the match against Tampines Rovers on 12 February in which he was an unused substitute. He made his S.League bow five days later against SAF FC, replacing Rodrigo Gral in the closing stages after Shahrazen Said netted a late game-winning goal for a 1–2 score.

Nurul Azami was finally given a chance to play from the start on 24 October against Hougang United after regular right-back Subhi Bakir was caught with a disciplinary suspension. He duly scored the third goal of the game in a 1–3 win to put the S.League title within touching distance for DPMM. Unfortunately, he suffered an injury on his next game against Balestier Khalsa, DPMM conceded two goals after his substitution to lose 0–2 at the Hassanal Bolkiah National Stadium to hand Tampines Rovers the league title. The injury ultimately curtailed his development, as he would manage only two substitute appearances for the next two seasons. He had to repeat his Cooper test in 2014 and was released at the conclusion of that season.

Nurul Azami made several appearances for Kota Ranger FC in the 2015 Brunei Premier League and scored a goal against BSRC FT in a 3–2 victory. The Rangers finished the season unbeaten at the top of the league and won promotion to the 2016 Brunei Super League. He returned to the team for the 2017–18 season and once again scored in a league fixture against Jerudong FC.

== Honours ==
Majra FC

- Brunei League Cup: 2011

DPMM FC

- Singapore League Cup: 2012

Kota Ranger

- Brunei Premier League: 2015
