= Cambodia national under-21 football team =

National association football team

Cambodia U19
- Nickname(s): អ្នកចម្បាំងអង្គរ (Angkor Warriors) គោព្រៃកម្ពុជា (Kouprey Kampuchea)
- Association: Football Federation of Cambodia
- Confederation: AFC (Asia)
- Sub-confederation: AFF (Southeast Asia)
- Head coach: Yasuhiro Yoshida
- Home stadium: Phnom Penh Olympic Stadium; Morodok Techo National Stadium
- FIFA code: CAM
First colours	Second colours

First international
- Vietnam 3–1 Cambodia (Phnom Penh, Cambodia; 23 January 2002)

Biggest win
- Northern Mariana Islands 0–9 Cambodia (Phnom Penh, Cambodia; 04 November 2019)

Biggest defeat
- Thailand 10–1 Cambodia (Brunei; 10 March 2007)

AFC U-19 Championship
- Appearances: 3 (first in 1963)
- Best result: Group Stage (3 times)

Cambodia national under-19 football team is the national under-19 football team representing Cambodia at the AFC U-20 Asian Cup, AFF U19 Championship, and Hassanal Bolkiah Trophy. It is administered by the Football Federation of Cambodia.

== Competition Records ==
=== AFC U-20 Asian Cup ===
AFC U-20 Asian Cup
Year	Round	GP	W	D	L	GF	GA
(Federation of Malaya) 1963	Group stage	5	2	0	3	7	12
(Thailand) 1972	Group stage	3	0	1	2	0	8
(Thailand) 1974	Group stage	3	1	0	2	7	6
(Uzbekistan) 2020	Qualified but competition canceled due to COVID-19						
Total	Best: Group stage	11	3	1	7	14	26

=== AFF U20 Youth Championship record ===
AFF U20 Youth Championship
Year	Round	GP	W	D	L	GF	GA
(Thailand) (Cambodia) 2002	Group stage	4	0	1	3	3	9
(Indonesia) 2005	did not enter						
(Malaysia) 2006	did not enter						
(Vietnam) 2007	Group stage	3	0	0	3	1	14
Total	Best: Group stage	7	0	1	6	4	23

=== AFF U19 Youth Championship record ===
AFF U19 Youth Championship
Year	Round	GP	W	D	L	GF	GA
(Thailand) 2008	did not enter						
(Vietnam) 2009	Group stage	3	0	0	3	1	9
(Vietnam) 2010	did not enter						
(Myanmar) 2011	Group stage	4	1	2	1	6	9
(Vietnam) 2012	did not enter						
(Indonesia) 2013	Group stage	4	2	0	2	10	9
(Vietnam) 2014	did not enter						
(Laos) 2015	Group stage	4	2	1	1	6	7
(Vietnam) 2016	Group stage	5	1	0	4	7	11
(Myanmar) 2017	Group stage	5	1	1	3	8	10
(Indonesia) 2018	Group stage	5	2	0	2	8	7
(Vietnam) 2019	Group stage	5	2	0	3	7	13
(Indonesia) 2022	Group stage	4	1	0	3	4	8
Total	Best: Group stage	39	12	4	22	57	83

=== Hassanal Bolkiah Trophy record ===
(Brunei) Hassanal Bolkiah Trophy (Brunei)
Year	Round	GP	W	D	L	GS	GA
2002	Group stage	4	0	1	3	2	16
2005	did not enter						
2007	Third place	4	1	1	2	9	19
2012	Group stage	4	0	0	4	4	9
2014	Group stage	5	3	0	2	6	6
2018	Runner-up	4	2	0	2	4	3
Total	Best: Runners-up	21	6	2	13	25	53

== Fixture and results ==
Win Draw Lose

=== 2026 ===
ASEAN U19 BOY'S CHAMPIONSHIPS 2026

6 June 2026 2026 ASEAN U-19 Boys' Championship	Cambodia	3−0	Philippines	Deli Serdang, Indonesia
20:00	Sorles 5', 14': Mathew 39'			Stadium: Madya North Sumatra Stadium, Deli Serdang; Referee: Alongkorn Khonwai (Thailand)

9 June 2026 2026 ASEAN U-19 Boys' Championship	Australia	2−2	Cambodia	Deli Serdang, Indonesia
20:00	Niel 3': Nunes 18'		Sokea 59': Marinucci 82' (o.g.)	Stadium: Mayada North Sumatra Stadium, Deli Serdang; Referee: Zakaria Ismail (Malaysia)

2027 AFC U-20 Asian Cup qualification

31 August 2026 2027 AFC U-20 Asian Cup qualification	Yemen	1−2	Cambodia	Phnom Penh
	Mokhtar 24'	Report	Menghong 15'; David 56' (pen.)	Stadium: Olympic Stadium; Referee: Mohamad Issa (Lebanon)

3 September 2026 2027 AFC U-20 Asian Cup qualification	Cambodia	0−8	Japan	Phnom Penh
		Report	Schmidt 26'; Tokuda 44'; Kidera 68'; Tokumura 74'; Fujita 78'; Vattana 80' (o.g.); Osa 89'; Phan 90+3' (o.g.)	Stadium: Olympic Stadium; Referee: Hasan Akrami (Iran)

6 September 2026 2027 AFC U-20 Asian Cup qualification	Cambodia	0−5	Kuwait	Phnom Penh
		Report	Allanqawi 12'; Al-Azemi 26'; Al-Adwani 40', 64'; Al-Qarzaei 55' (pen.)	Stadium: Olympic Stadium; Referee: Yousif Saeed Hasan (Iraq)

== Coaching staff ==
Position	Name
Head coach	(Japan) Yasuhiro Yoshida
Team manager	(Cambodia) Khul Phyrum
Assistant coach	(Cambodia) Ouk Sothy
Goalkeeper coach	(Cambodia) Beng Sokvorn
Doctor	(Cambodia) Meang Tithapour
Physiotherapist	(Cambodia) Neang Vanlyhov
Interpreter	(Cambodia) Sophea Kimleng

== Current squad ==
The following 23 players were called up for the 2026 ASEAN U-19 Boys' Championship.

No.	Pos.	Player	Date of birth (age)	Caps	Goals	Club
1	GK	Sambath Samnang	1 July 2008 (age 18)			(Football Federation of Cambodia) Bati Academy
21	GK	Mat Farib	20 May 2008 (age 18)			(Football Federation of Cambodia) Bati Academy
22	GK	Chhea Vuthy				(Football Federation of Cambodia) Bati Academy
2	DF	Han Ty	31 August 2007 (age 19)			(Football Federation of Cambodia) Angkor Tiger
3	DF	Poy Visa (Captain)	12 January 2008 (age 18)			(Football Federation of Cambodia) Preah Khan Reach Svay Rieng
4	DF	Leom Vatana	11 January 2008 (age 18)			(Football Federation of Cambodia) Bati Academy
5	DF	Soeng Somborithy	6 February 2007 (age 19)			(Football Federation of Cambodia) Visakha
6	DF	Phan Vreak	11 February 2008 (age 18)			(Football Federation of Cambodia) Visakha
17	DF	Try Sinarin	3 August 2007 (age 19)			(Football Federation of Cambodia) Boeung Ket
19	DF	Beth Samnang	6 October 2007 (age 19)			(Football Federation of Cambodia) Angkor Tiger
7	MF	Siem Raksa				(Football Federation of Cambodia) Visakha
8	MF	Sros Rayuth				(Football Federation of Cambodia) Visakha
12	MF	Ly Sok Kryya				(Football Federation of Cambodia) Visakha
14	MF	Noem Ovanda	2 October 2008 (age 18)			(Football Federation of Cambodia) ISI Dangkor Senchey
13	MF	Sean Oudom				(Football Federation of Cambodia) Visakha
16	MF	Oung Kimsou	19 June 2008 (age 18)			(Football Federation of Cambodia) Angkor Tiger
10	MF	Long David	4 November 2007 (age 18)			(Football Federation of Cambodia) ISI Dangkor Senchey
9	FW	Sakakibara Rintaro				(Football Federation of Cambodia) Phnom Penh Crown
11	FW	Sreng Sokea	1 March 2007 (age 19)			(Football Federation of Cambodia) Tiffy Army
15	FW	Sitha Mathew	22 May 2007 (age 19)			(Football Federation of Cambodia) Visakha
18	FW	Soeun Solido	14 January 2008 (age 18)			(Football Federation of Cambodia) Bati Academy
20	FW	Seth Mahamatsales	8 September 2008 (age 18)			(Football Federation of Cambodia) Bati Academy
23	FW	Sou Menghong	27 March 2007 (age 19)			(Football Federation of Cambodia) Angkor Tiger

== See also ==
=== Leagues ===
- Cambodian Premier League
- Cambodian League 2

=== Cups ===
- Hun Sen Cup
- Cambodian League Cup
- Cambodian Super Cup

=== National teams ===
Men

- Cambodia national football team
- Cambodia national under-23 football team
- Cambodia national under-17 football team

Women

- Cambodia women's national football team

Futsal

- Cambodia national futsal team

=== Other ===
- Football in Cambodia
- Cambodian Football Federation
