= Sarawut Janthapan =

Thai footballer (born 1984)

Personal information
- Full name: Sarawut Janthapan
- Date of birth: April 26, 1984 (age 42)
- Place of birth: Mukdahan, Thailand
- Height: 1.67 m (5 ft 5 1/2 in)
- Position: Attacking midfielder

Team information
- Current team: Thailand U20 (assistant)

Senior career*
Years	Team	Apps	(Gls)
2006–2009	Chonburi	48	(5)
2010	Chanthaburi	21	(2)
2011–2013	Chonburi	6	(0)
2014	→ Nakhon Ratchasima (loan)	5	(0)
2015	Nakhon Ratchasima		
2016	Samut Prakan United		
2016–2017	Ban Bueng United		
2017–2018	Uttaradit		

International career
2006	Thailand	2	(0)

Managerial career
- 2021: Pattaya Dolphins United
- 2022: Kasetsart (interim)
- 2022–2023: Samut Prakan City (assistant)
- 2023–2024: Uthaithani (assistant)
- 2024–2026: Rayong (assistant)
- 2026–: Thailand U20 (assistant)
- * Club domestic league appearances and goals as of 14 November 2008

Sarawut Janthapan (Thai: ศราวุฒิ จันทพันธ์, born April 26, 1984), simply known as (Thai: ต่าย), is a retired Thai professional footballer and coach, he is the currently assistant coach of Thailand U20.

He played for Chonburi FC in the 2008 AFC Champions League group stages.

== Honours ==
=== Club ===
Chonburi FC

- Thai Premier League Champions (1) : 2007
- Kor Royal Cup Winners (2) : 2008, 2009
