= 2002 AFF U-20 Youth Championship =

Tournament details
- Host countries: Thailand; Cambodia
- City: Bangkok; Phnom Penh
- Dates: 23 January – 3 February
- Teams: 10 (from 1 confederation)
- Venue: 2 (in 2 host cities)

Final positions
- Champions: Thailand (1st title)
- Runners-up: Myanmar
- Third place: Laos
- Fourth place: Vietnam

Tournament statistics
- Matches played: 24
- Goals scored: 89 (3.71 per match)

The 2002 AFF U-20 Youth Championship was the inaugural edition of the tournament. It took place from 23 January to 3 February 2002 and was co-hosted by Thailand and Cambodia with all ten member nations of the ASEAN Football Federation taking part.

== Teams ==
- Brunei
- Cambodia
- Indonesia
- Laos
- Malaysia
- Myanmar
- Philippines
- Singapore
- Thailand
- Vietnam

== Venues ==
| (Cambodia) Phnom Penh | (Thailand) Bangkok |
|---|---|
| Olympic Stadium | Thai-Japanese Stadium |
| Capacity: 50,000 | Capacity: 6,600 |

== Tournament ==
All times are Indochina Time (ICT) - UTC+7

=== Group stage ===
==== Group A ====
All matches in Bangkok, Thailand

| Team | Pld | W | D | L | GF | GA | GD | Pts |
|---|---|---|---|---|---|---|---|---|
| Thailand | 4 | 3 | 1 | 0 | 17 | 4 | +13 | 10 |
| Myanmar | 4 | 2 | 1 | 1 | 11 | 4 | +7 | 7 |
| Singapore | 4 | 2 | 0 | 2 | 6 | 13 | −7 | 6 |
| Malaysia | 4 | 1 | 1 | 2 | 6 | 13 | −7 | 4 |
| Indonesia | 4 | 0 | 1 | 3 | 5 | 11 | −6 | 1 |

23 January 2002
16:00

| Thailand | 5 – 1 | Singapore |
|---|---|---|
| Anucha Kitpongsri 56', 78'; Ekaphan Inthasen 67'; Panai Kongpraphan 71', 73' | Report | Muhammad Muhamad 3' |

Bangkok

23 January 2002
18:00

| Myanmar | 1 – 2 | Malaysia |

Bangkok

24 January 2002
16:00

| Thailand | 3 – 1 | Indonesia |
|---|---|---|
| Satid Mukkratok 8', 77' (pen.); Preecha Chaokla 88' | Report | Boy Jati Asmara 81' (pen.) |

Thai-Japanese Stadium, Bangkok

24 January 2002
18:00

| Myanmar | 7 – 1 | Singapore |
|---|---|---|
| Yan Paing 26', 31', 76'; Zaw Htaik 81', 86'; Kin Maung Tun 45'; Htwe Maung 84' | | unknown ?' |

Bangkok

25 January 2002
18:00

| Malaysia | 3 – 3 | Indonesia |

Bangkok

26 January 2002
16:00

| Thailand | 1 – 1 | Myanmar |
|---|---|---|
| Parinya Sunkammuan 70' | Report | Soe Lin Tun 7' (Note: RSSSF reports this as a 17th-minute goal.) |

Thai-Japanese Stadium, Bangkok

26 January 2002
18:00

| Singapore | 1 – 0 | Malaysia |

Bangkok

28 January 2002
16:00

| Thailand | 8 – 1 | Malaysia |
|---|---|---|
| Panai Kongpraphan 8'; Ekaphan Inthasen ?', ?', ?', ?'; 3 unknown scorers | Report | Tengku Alias Tengku Ibrahim (red card) 54'; Fadzli Saari 61' |

Bangkok

28 January 2002
18:00

| Singapore | 3 – 1 | Indonesia |

Bangkok

29 January 2002
18:00

| Myanmar | 2 – 0 | Indonesia |

Bangkok

==== Group B ====
All matches in Phnom Penh, Cambodia

| Team | Pld | W | D | L | GF | GA | GD | Pts |
|---|---|---|---|---|---|---|---|---|
| Laos | 4 | 4 | 0 | 0 | 11 | 2 | +9 | 12 |
| Vietnam | 4 | 3 | 0 | 1 | 13 | 2 | +11 | 9 |
| Brunei | 4 | 1 | 1 | 2 | 3 | 7 | −4 | 4 |
| Philippines | 4 | 1 | 0 | 3 | 1 | 11 | −10 | 3 |
| Cambodia | 4 | 0 | 1 | 3 | 3 | 9 | −6 | 1 |

23 January 2002
14:00

| Vietnam | 3 – 1 | Cambodia |

Phnom Penh
23 January 2002
16:00

| Laos | 4 – 0 | Philippines |

Phnom Penh

24 January 2002
14:00

| Vietnam | 6 – 0 | Philippines |

Phnom Penh
24 January 2002
16:00

| Cambodia | 1 – 1 | Brunei |

Phnom Penh

25 January 2002
16:00

| Laos | 2 – 1 | Brunei |

Phnom Penh

26 January 2002
14:00

| Laos | 1 – 0 | Vietnam |

Phnom Penh
26 January 2002
16:00

| Cambodia | 0 – 1 | Philippines |

Phnom Penh

28 January 2002
14:00

| Vietnam | 4 – 0 | Brunei |

Phnom Penh
28 January 2002
16:00

| Cambodia | 1 – 4 | Laos |

Phnom Penh

29 January 2002
16:00

| Brunei | 1 – 0 | Philippines |

Phnom Penh

=== Knockout stage ===
All matches in Bangkok, Thailand

==== Bracket ====
Semi-finals
1 February – Bangkok
Thailand | 3
Vietnam | 2
1 February – Bangkok
Laos | 0
Myanmar | 1

Final
3 February – Bangkok
Thailand | 4
Myanmar | 0
Third place
3 February – Bangkok
Vietnam | 1
Laos | 2

==== Semi-finals ====
1 February 2002
16:00

| Thailand | 3 – 2 | Vietnam |
|---|---|---|
| Panai Kongpraphan 21'; Teeratep Winothai 63'; Ekaphan Inthasen 80' | Report | Nguyen Anh Cuong 35'; Pham Van Quyen 85' |

Bangkok

1 February 2002
18:00

| Laos | 0 – 1 | Myanmar |

Bangkok

==== Third place play-off ====
3 February 2002
14:00

| Laos | 2 – 1 | Vietnam |

Bangkok

==== Final ====
3 February 2002
16:00

| Thailand | 4 – 0 | Myanmar |

Bangkok

== Winner ==
2002 AFC U-20 Youth Championship winners

Thailand
First title
