= Brunei national under-21 football team =

National association football team

Brunei Under-21
- Nickname(s): Tabuan Muda (Young Wasps)
- Association: FABD
- Confederation: AFC
- Sub-confederation: AFF
- Head coach: Aminuddin Jumat
- Home stadium: Sultan Hassanal Bolkiah Stadium
First colours	Second colours

First international
- Brunei 1–6 Hong Kong (Manila, Philippines; 16 April 1970)

Biggest win
- Brunei 6–0 Pakistan (Guam; 20 June 2000); Brunei 6–0 Guam (Paju, South Korea; 27 March 2000)

Biggest defeat
- Hong Kong 12–0 Brunei (Bangkok, Thailand; 21 April 1972); Malaysia 12–0 Brunei (Palembang, Indonesia; 13 August 2005)

AFC U-20 Championship
- Appearances: 4 (first in 1970)
- Best result: Group Stage (4 Times)

Brunei national under-21 football team is the under-21 football team of Brunei. The team participates in the Hassanal Bolkiah Trophy.

== International records ==
=== AFC Youth Championship ===
- 1970 AFC Youth Championship
- 1972 AFC Youth Championship
- 1974 AFC Youth Championship
- 1975 AFC Youth Championship

=== Hassanal Bolkiah Trophy record ===
(Brunei) Hassanal Bolkiah Trophy (Brunei)
Year	Round	GP	W	D	L	GS	GA
2002	Group Stage	4	1	1	2	4	12
2005	Group Stage	3	2	0	1	4	7
2007	Group Stage	3	1	1	1	6	7
2012	Champions	6	5	0	1	13	6
2014	Group Stage	5	3	1	1	10	6
2018	Group Stage	3	1	0	2	2	3
Total	6/6	24	13	3	8	39	41

== See also ==
- Brunei national football team
- Brunei national under-23 football team
- Brunei national under-19 football team
- Brunei national under-17 football team
