= Malaysia national under-22 football team =

Malaysia U-22
- Nickname(s): Harimau Muda (Young Tigers)
- Association: Football Association of Malaysia
- Confederation: AFC (Asia)
- Sub-confederation: AFF (Southeast Asia)
- Head coach: Nafuzi Zain
- Captain: Eric Pathansali
- Home stadium: Bukit Jalil National Stadium
- FIFA code: MAS
First colours	Second colours

Malaysia national under-22 football team (also known as Malaysia Under-22, Malaysia U-22 or Malaysia B-22) represents Malaysia in international football competitions including in the SEA Games of the 2017 edition. It is managed by the Football Association of Malaysia (FAM). This team was created for the 2013 AFC U-22 Championship qualification, 2017 SEA Games and participated in the 2019 AFF U-22 Youth Championship.

== History ==
After Harimau Muda project disbanded in 2015, FAM needed a fresh start for the U-23 team where a new set of players was brought in for the team with the creation of SEA Games Project 2017 team which was then announced as the national under-22 team. The players in the current team mainly consist of players with age around 18 to 21 years old where the oldest players will be below the age requirement of 22 years old when 2017 SEA Games in Malaysia started. With bigger pool of players within age of 18-22, the team will also play in other age-restricted tournament as the younger side such as U-21 and U-22 when needed.

The team is considered to be the feeder team for the Malaysia national football team. It is for players under the age of 22 and less. Also in existence are national teams for Under-19s, Under-16s and Under-14s. As long as they are eligible, players can play at any level, hence it is possible for one to play for the U-22s, senior side and then again for the U-22s.

=== Frank Bernhardt era ===
Frank Bernhardt has been announced as the new head coach for the newly created Malaysia under-22 national football team in preparation for 2017 Southeast Asian Games. The 46-year-old began his new job as national under-22 boss on Monday at Football Association of Malaysia (FAM) headquarters in Kelana Jaya. His first task is to pick an assistant from four candidates—Hassan Sazali, P. Maniam, Reduan Abdullah and Azlan Johar. And then Bernhardt will choose a squad of 25 players to work with ahead of the SEA Games football tournament on home soil in August 2017.

25 players, including President's Cup players from DRB-Hicom and Sime Darby were picked to join the U22 national team third training camp.

== Tournament records ==
=== AFC U-22 Championship ===
Note: AFC U-22 in 2013.

AFC U-22 Championship Record								AFC U-22 qualification Record						Head coach
Year	Round	GP	W	D	L	GF	GA	Pld	W	D	L	GF	GA	
(Oman) 2013	did not qualify							5	3	0	2	17	7	(Malaysia) Ong Kim Swee
Total	Best: None	–	–	–	–	–	–	5	3	0	2	17	7	

=== SEA Games ===
Note: All Malaysian participants from U-22 since 31 March 2016 are only for SEA Games.

SEA Games Record
Year	Round	Position	GP	W	D*	L	GS	GA
(Malaysia) 2017	Runners-up	2/11	6	5	0	1	11	5
Total	Best: Runners-up	1/1	6	5	0	1	11	5

*Denotes draws include knockout matches decided on penalty kicks.
**Red border colour indicates tournament was held on home soil.

=== Hassanal Bolkiah Trophy record ===
(Brunei) Hassanal Bolkiah Trophy
Year	Round	GP	W	D	L	GS	GA
2002	Third Place	5	2	0	3	13	9
2005	Group Stage	4	2	0	2	3	7
2007	Third Place	4	1	1	2	4	7
Total	Best: Third Place	13	5	1	7	20	23

== Recent results ==
Win Draw Lose

== Players ==
=== Current squad ===
- The following 20 players were called up for the 2025 Southeast Asian Games.
- Caps and goals correct as of:

No.	Pos.	Player	Date of birth (age)	Caps	Goals	Club
1	GK	Syahmi Adib Haikal	30 March 2003 (age 23)	1	0	(Football Association of Malaysia) Negeri Sembilan
23	GK	Haziq Aiman	19 January 2005 (age 21)	0	0	(Football Association of Malaysia) Melaka
2	DF	Faris Danish	4 July 2006 (age 20)	0	0	(Football Association of Malaysia) Johor Darul Ta'zim II
	DF	Noah Leembruggen	27 May 2005 (age 21)	0	0	(Royal Dutch Football Association) NEC Nijmegen
	DF	Sam Gower	27 April 2007 (age 19)	0	0	(Royal Spanish Football Federation) Inmaculada CF
	DF	Raja Idris Othman Raja Rizal Azman	24 September 2005 (age 21)	0	0	(The Football Association) Loughborough University
	DF	Paarveen Waran	6 February 2007 (age 19)	0	0	(Portuguese Football Federation) F.C. Vizela
	DF	Josh Robinson	20 December 2004 (age 21)	0	0	(The Football Association) Notts County
	DF	Ariq Darius Fharied	31 January 2010 (age 16)	0	0	(Qatar Football Association) Al-Rayyan Academy
	MF	Eric Pathansali (captain)	2 January 2007 (age 19)	0	0	(Swedish Football Association) IF Brommapojkarna
	MF	Arfan Ariff	21 August 2007 (age 19)	0	0	(Football Association of Singapore) Balestier Khalsa
	MF	Bastian Aaron Lim	22 August 2006 (age 20)	0	0	(Football Association of Indonesia) Batavia
	MF	Isaiah Teng	13 February 2008 (age 18)	0	0	(Argentine Football Association) Vélez Sarsfield
	MF	Reyess Shaqeel Emir	16 January 2009 (age 17)	0	0	(The Football Association) Queens Park Rangers
	MF	Dylan Tellado	9 October 2005 (age 21)	0	0	(United States Soccer Federation) Harvard Crimson
	FW	Michael Wong	23 February 2008 (age 18)	0	0	(New Zealand Football) Auckland United
	FW	Zachary Chung	5 April 2005 (age 21)	0	0	(New Zealand Football) Birkenhead United AFC
	FW	Putera Luqman Hafiz	27 May 2010 (age 16)	0	0	(Football Australia) Malvern City
	FW	Kim Johan Nyo Tegnander	3 February 2009 (age 17)	0	0	(Norwegian Football Federation) Pors II
22	FW	Haqimi Azim	6 January 2003 (age 23)	6	2	(Football Association of Malaysia) Kuala Lumpur City

=== Recent call-ups ===
These players are called up over the last 36 months.

Pos.	Player	Date of birth (age)	Caps	Goals	Club	Latest call-up

== Team officials ==
Roles	Names	Appointment date
Team Management
CEO	(Canada) Rob Friend	31 December 2024
Deputy CEO	(Malaysia) Stanley Bernard	15 April 2025
Coaching Staff
Head coach	(Malaysia) Nafuzi Zain	16 December 2024
Assistant coach	(South Korea) Koo Ja-cheol	
Assistant coach	(Wales) Ryan Giggs	
Assistant coach	(Malaysia) Hairuddin Omar	5 January 2025
Assistant coach	(Malaysia) Shukor Adan	12 October 2023
Assistant coach	(Japan) Atsuto Uchida	
Goalkeeping coach	(Japan) Eiji Kawashima	
Goalkeeping coach	(Malaysia) Khairul Fahmi Che Mat	
Fitness coach	(Malaysia) Khairal Afiq	
Doctor	(Malaysia) Ridzuan Azmi	
Physiotherapist	(Japan) Masaaki Taira	
Physiotherapist	(Malaysia) Harris Zafran Ahmad Haraman	
Masseur	(Malaysia) Ahmad Ramzi Ahmad Zaini	
Kitman	(Malaysia) Sukri Haimi	
Video analyst	(Malaysia) Ahmad Hilmi Abdul Latif	
Nutritionist	(Malaysia) Norazmi Ramliy	
Media Officer	(Malaysia) Wan Mohd Fakhrul Anwar Wan Bakar	
Team Administrator	(Malaysia) Azfendy Azzudin	
Team coordinator	(Malaysia) Zulfadli Rozi	17 March 2025
Technical director	(Malaysia) Tan Cheng Hoe	15 April 2025

=== Head coaches ===
- (Germany) Frank Bernhardt (2016–2017)
- (Malaysia) Ong Kim Swee (2017)
- (Malaysia) E. Elavarasan (2023–2024)
- (Malaysia) Nafuzi Zain (2025–)

=== Head coaches records ===
As of 25 March 2017

Malaysia national football team head coaches
Name	Country	Period	GP	W	D*	L	GS	GA	GD	Win %
Frank Bernhardt	Germany	2016–2017	14	5	5	4	17	18	−1	35.71
Ong Kim Swee	Malaysia	2017	6	5	0	1	11	5	+6	83.33
E. Elavarasan	Malaysia	2023–2024	5	3	0	2	12	8	+4	60.00

== Honours ==
=== Regional ===
- Southeast Asian Games
  - (silver) Silver medals: 2017

=== Others ===
- Merlion Cup
  - (gold) Winner: 2023

== See also ==
- Malaysia national football team
- Malaysia women's national football team
- Malaysia national under-19 football team
- Malaysia national under-16 football team
