= Serigne Abdou Thiam =

Qatari footballer (1995–2016)

Serigne Abdou
Personal information
- Full name: Serigne Abdou Thiam
- Date of birth: 28 February 1995
- Place of birth: Doha, Qatar
- Date of death: 27 September 2016 (aged 21)
- Position: Defender

Youth career
- ?–2013: ASPIRE

Senior career*
Years	Team	Apps	(Gls)
2012–2016	Al Khor	26	(3)

International career
2011–2015	Qatar U20	8	(1)
- * Club domestic league appearances and goals

Serigne Abdou (28 February 1995 – 27 September 2016) was a Qatari professional footballer who played for Al Khor as a defender. He also played for the Qatar youth team.

== Club career ==
Abdou graduated from Aspire Academy in 2013. He made his league debut with Al Khor 19 November 2012 against Al Gharafa at the age of 17.

== Death ==
Serigne died of cancer on 27 September 2016 aged 21.

== Career statistics ==
Appearances and goals by club, season and competition
Club	Season	League			National cup (Note: Includes Emir of Qatar Cup.)		League cup (Note: Includes Sheikh Jassim Cup.)		Continental (Note: Includes AFC Champions League.)		Total	
Club	Season	Division	Apps	Goals	Apps	Goals	Apps	Goals	Apps	Goals	Apps	Goals
Al Khor	2012–13	Qatar Stars League	10	2	1	1	0	0	0	0	11	3
Al Khor	2013–14	Qatar Stars League	16	1	5	1	0	0	0	0	19	1
Total			26	3	6	2	8	0	0	0	30	4
