= Wei Jingzong =

Chinese association football player

Personal information
- Date of birth: 28 January 1995 (age 31)
- Place of birth: Wuhan, Hubei, China
- Height: 1.79 m (5 ft 10 in)
- Position: Midfielder

Senior career*
Years	Team	Apps	(Gls)
2015–2018	Felgueiras 1932	14	(1)
2016	→ Oliveira do Hospital (loan)	8	(0)
2017	→ Shandong Luneng (loan)	0	(0)
2018–2019	Cangzhou Mighty Lions	7	(0)
2020–2022	Zhejiang	2	(0)
2021	→ Sichuan Jiuniu (Loan)	4	(1)
2022–2023	Wuhan Jiangcheng	13	(1)

International career
- China U18
- China U19
2014	China U20	1	(0)
- * Club domestic league appearances and goals as of 14:01, 15 December 2022 (UTC)

Wei Jingzong (Chinese: 魏敬宗; born 28 January 1995) is a Chinese footballer last played as a midfielder for Wuhan Jiangcheng.

== Club career ==
Wei Jingzong would play for the Hubei youth team that studied abroad for their training, where he remained to start his professional football career when he joined third tier Portuguese football club Felgueiras 1932. He would have loan periods with Oliveira do Hospital and Shandong Luneng before permanently returning to China with second tier club Cangzhou Mighty Lions on 1 March 2018.

On 28 February 2020, Wei would join second tier football club Zhejiang. After only one season he would loaned out to another second tier club in Sichuan Jiuniu on 31 July 2021.

== Career statistics ==
As of 15 December 2022.

Club	Season	League			Cup		Continental		Other		Total	
Club	Season	Division	Apps	Goals	Apps	Goals	Apps	Goals	Apps	Goals	Apps	Goals
Felgueiras 1932	2014–15	Campeonato de Portugal	9	0	0	0	–		–		9	0
Felgueiras 1932	2015–16	Campeonato de Portugal	0	0	0	0	–		–		0	0
Felgueiras 1932	2016–17	Campeonato de Portugal	5	1	0	0	–		–		5	1
Felgueiras 1932	Total		14	1	0	0	0	0	0	0	14	1
Oliveira do Hospital (loan)	2015–16	Campeonato de Portugal	8	0	0	0	–		–		8	0
Shandong Luneng (loan)	2017	Chinese Super League	0	0	0	0	–		–		0	0
Cangzhou Mighty Lions	2018	China League One	7	0	1 (Note: Appearances in the Chinese FA Cup)	0	–		–		8	0
Cangzhou Mighty Lions	2019	China League One	0	0	0	0	–		–		0	0
Cangzhou Mighty Lions	Total		7	0	1	0	0	0	0	0	8	0
Zhejiang	2020	China League One	2	0	1	0	–		0 (Note: Appearance(s) in CSL Relegation play-offs)	0	3	0
Zhejiang	2021	China League One	0	0	0	0	–		0	0	0	0
Zhejiang	Total		2	0	1	0	0	0	0	0	3	0
Sichuan Jiuniu (loan)	2021	China League One	4	1	3	0	–		–		7	1
Wuhan Jiangcheng	2022	China League Two	13	1	0	0	–		–		13	1
Career total			48	3	5	0	0	0	0	0	53	3
