= Hassanal Bolkiah National Stadium =

Stadium in Brunei

Coordinates: 4°55′44.5″N 114°56′43.6″E

Hassanal Bolkiah National Stadium Stadium Negara Hassanal Bolkiah
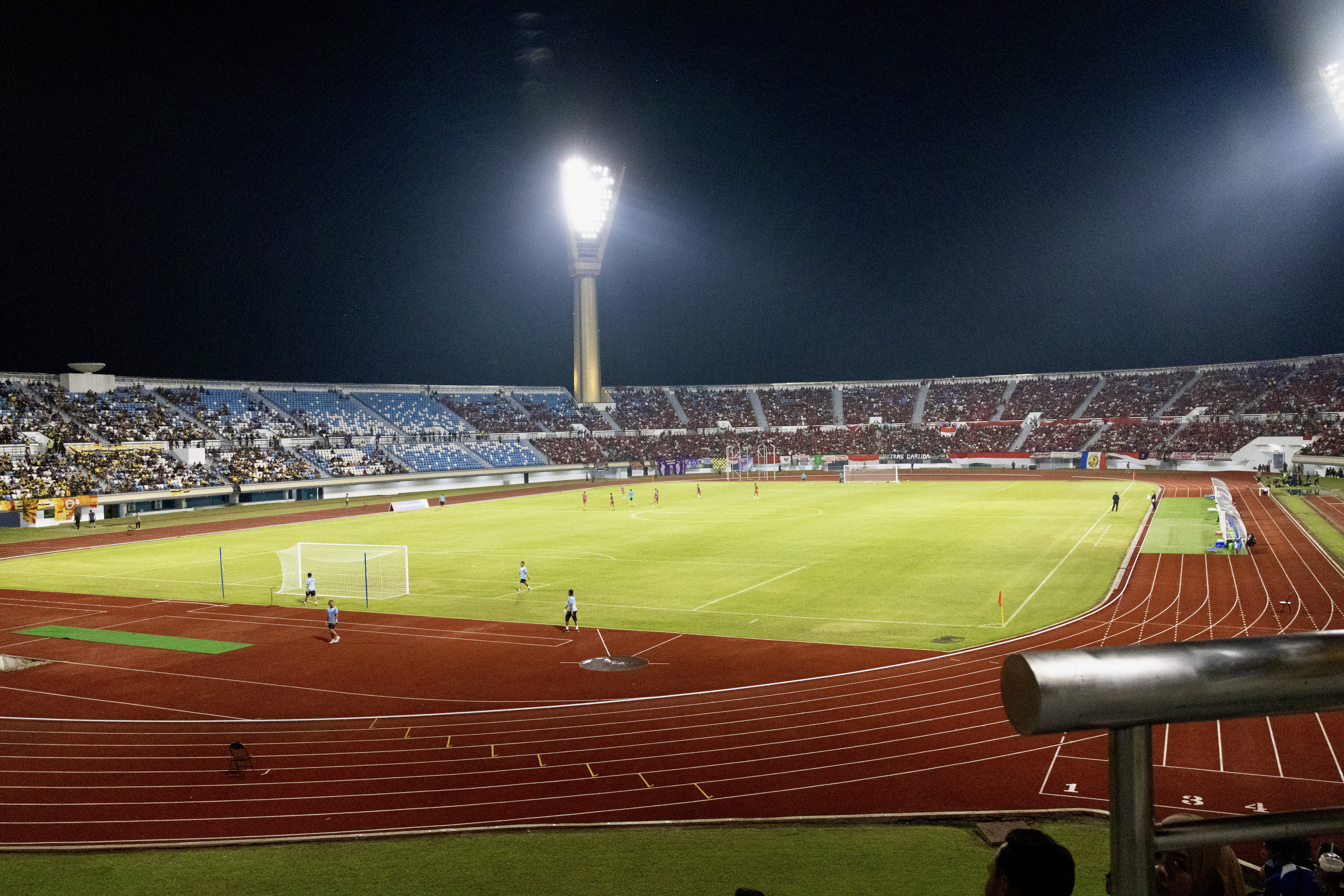
- The interior of the stadium in 2023
- Interactive map of Hassanal Bolkiah National Stadium; Stadium Negara Hassanal Bolkiah
- Location: Bandar Seri Begawan, Brunei
- Owner: Ministry of Culture, Youth and Sports
- Capacity: 28,000
- Surface: Grass

Construction
- Groundbreaking: August 1980; 46 years ago
- Opened: 23 September 1983; 43 years ago
- Renovated: 1992, 1999, 2021–2023
- Cost: S$100 million
- Architect: SAA Partnership

Tenants
- Brunei national football team (1983–present); DPMM FC (2000–present); Kasuka FC (selected matches)

Hassanal Bolkiah National Stadium (Malay: Stadium Negara Hassanal Bolkiah; abbrev. SNHB) is a multi-purpose stadium in Bandar Seri Begawan, Brunei. It is currently used mostly for association football matches. The stadium holds 28,000 and was opened on 23 September 1983. It was named after Bruneian Sultan Hassanal Bolkiah.

== Construction ==
The idea of constructing a modern stadium in Brunei was first made by the former Sultan Haji Omar Ali Saifuddien III to commemorate the visit of Elizabeth II on February 29, 1972. A meeting was held on May 16, 1972 on which the special committee made a decision to build a stadium in Bandar Seri Begawan. Unusually for a public building in Brunei, members of the public donated and contributed towards the building of the stadium. Although the final collection of $1,102,761.57 accounted for a little more than 1.1 percent of the total building cost ($100 million), the public participation showed the Bruneians' great interest and support for this project. The entire project cost for the stadium is about $100 million.

== Building ==
The stadium is 850 feet (260 m) long and 632 feet (193 m) wide. It can accommodate 30,000 spectators, which includes 110 seats for the royalties, 500 for the VIPs, and 3,000 in the grandstand section. It has four light towers — each is 198 feet (60 m) high and equipped with 108 2-kilowatt metal-halide lamps. The grandstand is covered with aluminium roofs which have a total length of 198 feet (60 m) and a total width of 135 feet (41 m). The parking spaces can accommodate 2,785 private vehicles and 158 buses. The building is oriented in north-south direction with the grandstand located at the western section. It has a football field which fulfills FIFA standards, as well as the running track which fulfills IAAF standards. The stadium has a videomatrix scoreboard located at the northern section; it can display both Latin and Jawi writing.

== Opening ==
It was opened on 23 September 1983, the date was chosen to celebrate the 69th birthday of Bolkiah's father and predecessor Omar Ali Saifuddien III. On the evening of the opening day, a friendly football match was played between the Brunei national football team and an invited English Football League team, Sheffield United. Despite the jet lag and the humid weather, Sheffield United won 1–0. The next day another match was held between United and a Brunei invited team which ended in a 1–1 draw.

== Renovation ==
The stadium was renovated from 2021 and completed in the middle of 2022. Home matches for the national football team were held at the Track & Field Sports Complex instead.

On 17 October 2023, the stadium hosted the 2026 FIFA World Cup qualifying match against Indonesia, opening its doors after last hosting the national team in 2019.

== Major events ==
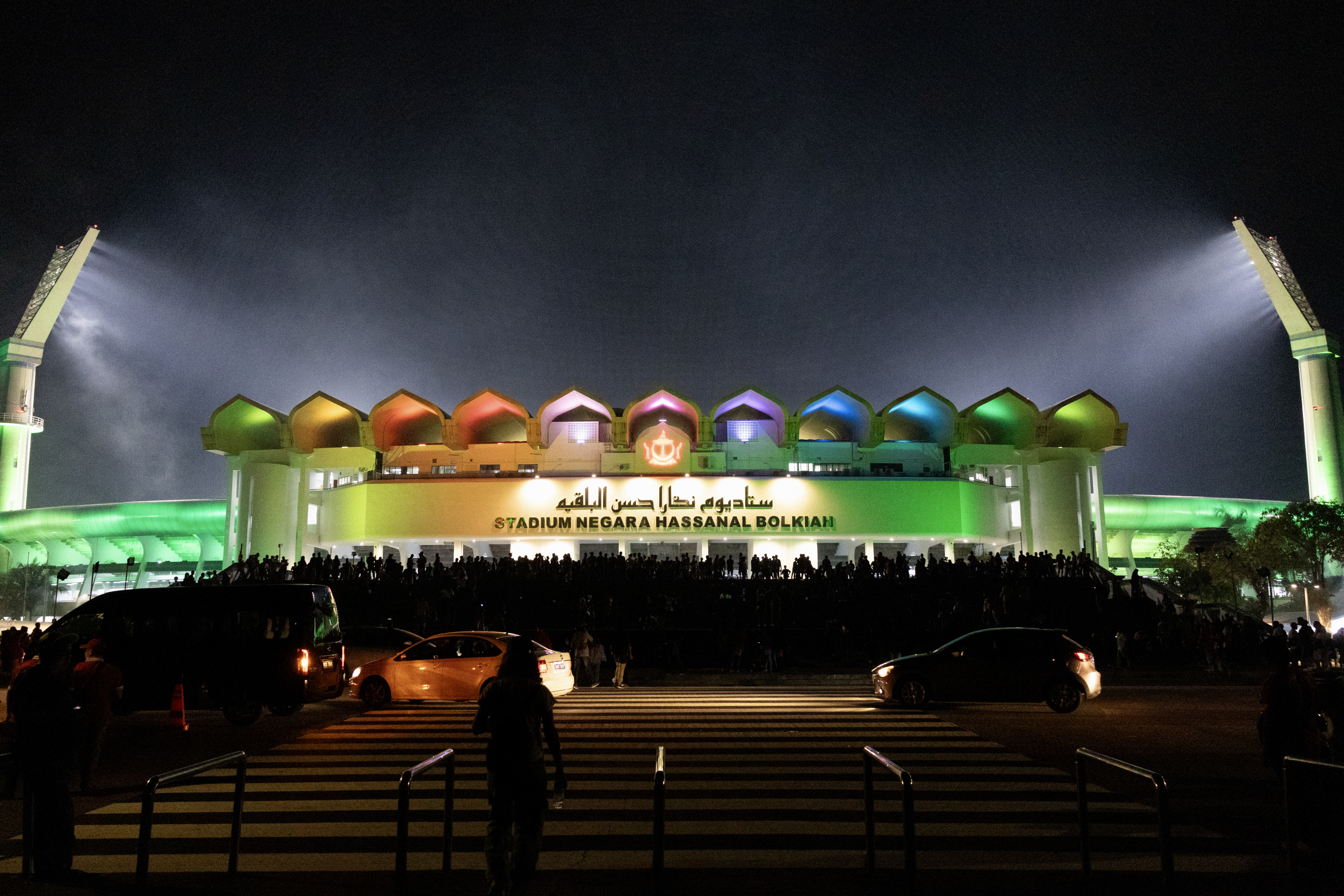
The stadium lit up at night amid the 2026 World Cup Qualifying match between Brunei and Indonesia

=== 1999 ===
- 20th Southeast Asian Games on 7–15 August.

=== 2002 ===
- Hassanal Bolkiah Trophy on 16–26 August.

=== 2005 ===
- Hassanal Bolkiah Trophy on 13–25 March.

=== 2007 ===
- Hassanal Bolkiah Trophy on 3–12 March.

=== 2012 ===
- Hassanal Bolkiah Trophy on 24 February–9 March.

=== 2014 ===
- Hassanal Bolkiah Trophy on 9–23 August.

Preceded by Gelora Bung Karno Stadium; Indonesia	Southeast Asian Games Athletics competitions Main Venue; 1999	Succeeded by Bukit Jalil Stadium; Malaysia
