= Tiny Bounmalay =

Laotian professional footballer

Personal information
- Full name: Tiny Bounmalay
- Date of birth: 6 June 1993 (age 33)
- Place of birth: Laos
- Position: Midfielder

Team information
- Current team: Muanghat United

Senior career*
Years	Team	Apps	(Gls)
2014–2018	Lao Police Club	0	(0)
2022-	Muanghat United		

International career^{‡}
2014–2015	Laos U-23	2	(0)
2014–2018	Laos	7	(0)

Managerial career
- 2020-2021: Garuda
- * Club domestic league appearances and goals as of 11:59, 18 November 2014 (UTC) ‡ National team caps and goals as of 11:59, 18 November 2014 (UTC)

Tiny Bounmalay (born 6 June 1993) is a Laotian professional footballer who currently plays as a midfielder for Muanghat United in the Lao League 2.and former head coach Garuda F.C. in Lao League 2 season 2020-2021

== International career ==
Bounmalay had played for Laos U-23 team and also appeared in 11 matches (including 7 FIFA matches, 4 non-FIFA matches) for the Laos national football team.
