= Khin Maung Tun =

Burmese footballer

Personal information
- Date of birth: 12 October 1980 (age 46)
- Place of birth: Yangon, Myanmar
- Height: 1.73 m (5 ft 8 in)
- Position: Defender

Senior career*
Years	Team	Apps	(Gls)
2009–2013	Yadanarbon		

International career
2002–2010	Myanmar	21	(0)
- * Club domestic league appearances and goals

Khin Maung Tun (Burmese: ခင်မောင်ထွန်း) is a Burmese football player with Yadanabon FC of the Myanmar National League.

== Honours ==
- Myanmar National League Cup 2009
