= Preecha Chaokla =

Thai footballer

Personal information
- Full name: Preecha Chaokla
- Date of birth: 20 January 1983 (age 43)
- Place of birth: Samut Sakhon, Thailand
- Height: 1.78 m (5 ft 10 in)
- Position: Striker

Youth career
- 1999–2001: Bangkok Bank

Senior career*
| Years | Team | Apps | (Gls) |
| 2002–2004 | Bangkok Bank | 41 | (15) |
| 2005–2006 | Nam Định | 34 | (14) |
| 2007–2010 | Bangkok United | 72 | (23) |
| 2011 | Sisaket | | |
| 2012 | Bangkok | | |
| 2013 | Nakhon Pathom United | | |
| 2014–2015 | Samut Sakhon | | |

International career
| 2001 | Thailand U17 | | |
| 2005 | Thailand U23 | | |
- * Club domestic league appearances and goals as of 28 June 2008

Preecha Chaokla (Thai: ปรีชา ชาวกล้า) is a Thai former footballer. He won Thai Premier League title in 2006 with Bangkok University.

== Honours ==
Thailand U-19

- AFF U-20 Youth Championship: 2002

Thailand U-23

- SEA Games Gold Medal: 2005

== International goals ==
=== Under-19 ===
Preecha Chaokla – goals for Thailand U-19
| # | Date | Venue | Opponent | Score | Result | Competition |
|---|---|---|---|---|---|---|
| 1. | January 24, 2002 | Bangkok, Thailand | Indonesia | 3-1 | 3-1 | 2002 AFF U-20 Youth Championship |
