= 2005 AFF U-20 Youth Championship =

Kejuaraan Remaja U-19 AFF 2005

Tournament details
- Host country: Indonesia
- City: Palembang
- Dates: 5–19 August
- Teams: 10 (from 2 confederations)
- Venue: 2 (in 1 host city)

Final positions
- Champions: Myanmar (2nd title)
- Runners-up: Malaysia
- Third place: Laos
- Fourth place: Vietnam

Tournament statistics
- Matches played: 24
- Goals scored: 98 (4.08 per match)

The 2005 AFF U-20 Youth Championship was held in Palembang, Indonesia in August 2005. That was the first edition of the tournament since its inception in 2002. Ten nations took part with nine teams from the ASEAN region and one guest nation, the Maldives, from the South Asian region.

== Participating nations ==
- Brunei
- Indonesia
- Laos
- Malaysia
- Maldives
- Myanmar
- Singapore
- Thailand
- Timor-Leste
- Vietnam

== Tournament ==
All times are Western Indonesia Time (WIB) - UTC+7

=== Group stage ===
==== Group A ====
Team	Pld	W	D	L	GF	GA	GD	Pts
Myanmar	4	3	0	1	9	5	+4	9
Malaysia	4	2	1	1	19	6	+13	7
Indonesia	4	2	1	1	13	8	+5	7
Thailand	4	2	0	2	13	6	+7	6
Brunei	4	0	0	4	1	30	−29	0

5 August 2005
16:00

Indonesia	1 – 2	Thailand

Gelora Sriwijaya Stadium, Palembang

5 August 2005
18:45

Brunei	0 – 3	Myanmar

Gelora Sriwijaya Stadium, Palembang

7 August 2005
16:00

Indonesia	5 – 0	Brunei

Gelora Sriwijaya Stadium, Palembang

7 August 2005
18:45

Malaysia	3 – 1	Thailand

Gelora Sriwijaya Stadium, Palembang

9 August 2005
16:00

Thailand	0 – 1	Myanmar

Gelora Sriwijaya Stadium, Palembang

9 August 2005
18:45

Malaysia	3 – 3	Indonesia

Gelora Sriwijaya Stadium, Palembang

11 August 2005
16:00

Brunei	1 – 10	Thailand

Gelora Sriwijaya Stadium, Palembang

11 August 2005
18:45

Myanmar	2 – 1	Malaysia

Gelora Sriwijaya Stadium, Palembang

13 August 2005
15:45

Malaysia	12 – 0	Brunei

Patra Jaya, Palembang

13 August 2005
15:45

Indonesia	4 – 3	Myanmar

Gelora Sriwijaya Stadium, Palembang

==== Group B ====
Team	Pld	W	D	L	GF	GA	GD	Pts
Laos	4	3	1	0	8	1	+7	10
Vietnam	4	2	2	0	11	3	+8	8
Singapore	4	2	1	1	5	3	+2	7
Timor-Leste	4	0	1	3	5	15	−10	1
Maldives	4	0	1	3	3	10	−9	1

6 August 2005
16:00

Vietnam	1 – 1	Laos

Gelora Sriwijaya Stadium, Palembang

6 August 2005
18:45

Maldives	2 – 2	Timor-Leste

Gelora Sriwijaya Stadium, Palembang

8 August 2005
16:00

Laos	2 – 0	Maldives

Gelora Sriwijaya Stadium, Palembang

8 August 2005
18:45

Singapore	0 – 0	Vietnam

Gelora Sriwijaya Stadium, Palembang

10 August 2005
16:00

Vietnam	6 – 2	Timor-Leste

Gelora Sriwijaya Stadium, Palembang

10 August 2005
18:45

Singapore	0 – 1	Laos

Gelora Sriwijaya Stadium, Palembang

12 August 2005
16:00

Maldives	0 – 4	Vietnam

Gelora Sriwijaya Stadium, Palembang

12 August 2005
18:45

Timor-Leste	1 – 3	Singapore

Gelora Sriwijaya Stadium, Palembang

14 August 2005
16:00

Singapore	2 – 1	Maldives

Gelora Sriwijaya Stadium, Palembang

14 August 2005
18:45

Timor-Leste	0 – 4	Laos

Gelora Sriwijaya Stadium, Palembang

=== Knockout stage ===
==== Bracket ====
Semi-finals
17 August – Palembang
Myanmar (p)	1 (5)
Vietnam	1 (4)
17 August – Palembang
Laos	1
Malaysia	2

Final
19 August – Palembang
Myanmar	1
Malaysia	0
Third place
19 August – Palembang
Vietnam	1
Laos	4

==== Semi-finals ====
17 August 2005
16:00

Myanmar	1 – 1	Vietnam
Penalties
	5 – 4

Gelora Sriwijaya Stadium, Palembang

17 August 2005
19:15

Laos	1 – 2	Malaysia

Gelora Sriwijaya Stadium, Palembang

==== Third place play-off ====
19 August 2005
16:00

Vietnam	1 – 4	Laos

Gelora Sriwijaya Stadium, Palembang

==== Final ====
19 August 2005
19:00

Myanmar	1 – 0	Malaysia

Gelora Sriwijaya Stadium, Palembang

== Winner ==
2005 AFF U-20 Youth Championship winner

Myanmar
First title
