= Track and Field Sports Complex, Bandar Seri Begawan =

Multi-use stadium in Bandar Seri Begawan, Brunei

Track and Field Sports Complex
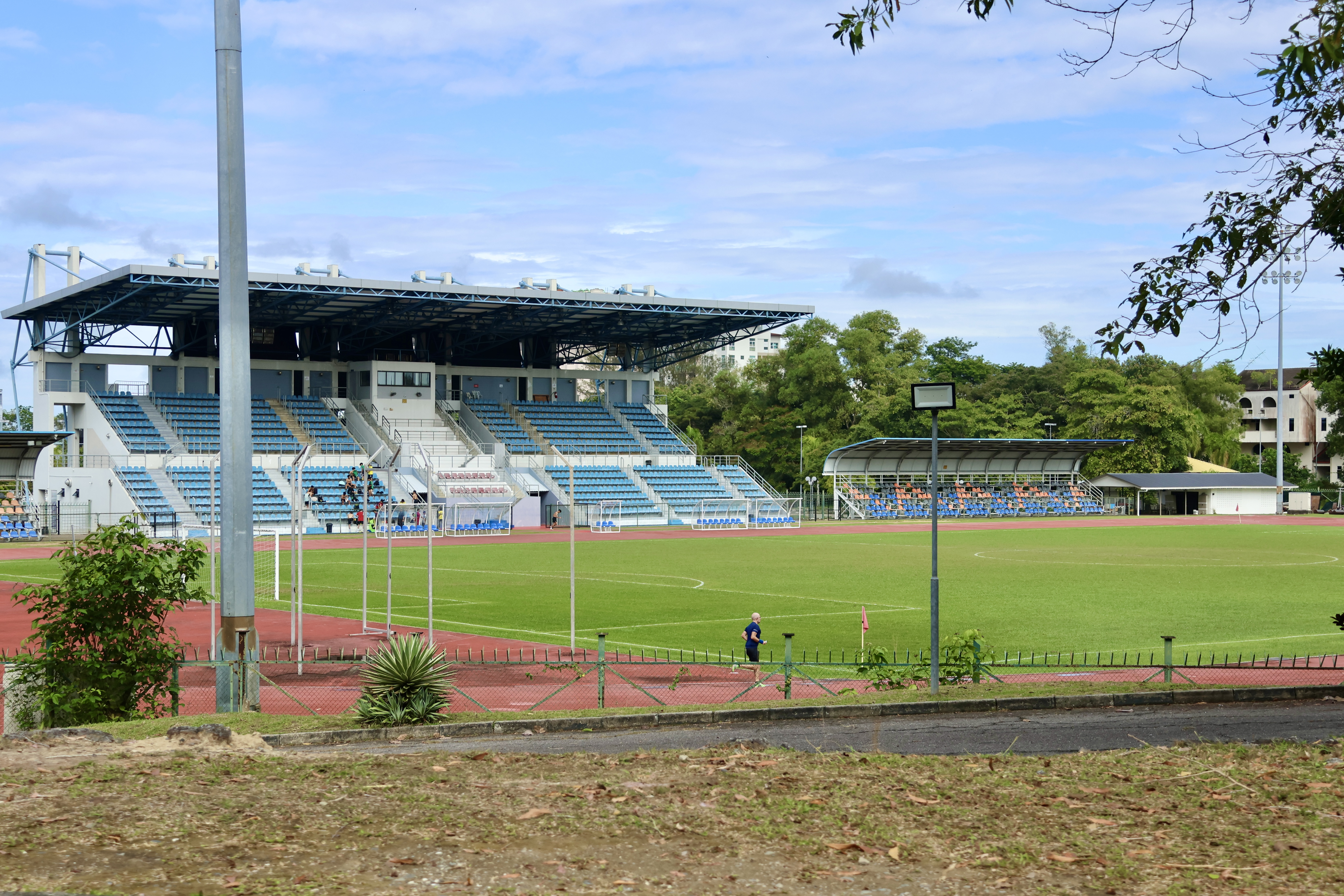
- The Track and Field Sports Complex in 2024
- Interactive map of Track and Field Sports Complex
- Full name: Track and Field Sports Complex
- Location: Bandar Seri Begawan
- Coordinates: 4.9312280°N 114.9470584°E
- Owner: Youth and Sports Department, Brunei
- Capacity: 1,700
- Surface: Grass

Construction
- Renovated: 1988

Tenants
- Kasuka FC (1993–present); Brunei national football team (2022–2023)

The Track and Field Sports Complex is a multi-use stadium in Bandar Seri Begawan, the capital of Brunei. It is currently used mostly for football matches as well as track and field events. The stadium holds 1,700 people.

== History ==
As the Hassanal Bolkiah National Stadium was undergoing renovation works, the Brunei national team used this stadium as their home ground mostly for friendly matches.

== International fixtures ==
Date	Team	Score	Team	Round
21 September 2022	Brunei	0–3	Maldives	Friendly
27 September 2022	Brunei	1–0	Laos	Friendly
5 November 2022	Brunei	6–2	Timor-Leste	2022 AFF Championship qualification
8 November 2022	Timor-Leste	1–0	Brunei	2022 AFF Championship qualification
