= Laos national under-21 football team =

Laos U-21
- Association: Lao Football Federation
- Confederation: AFC (Asia)
- Sub-confederation: AFF (Southeast Asia)
First colours	Second colours

The Laos national under-21 association football team is controlled by the Lao Football Federation.

== Roster ==
This is the list players participated in the 2018 Hassanal Bolkiah Trophy.

No.	Pos.	Player	Date of birth (age)	Caps	Goals	Club
20	GK	Saymanolinh Paseuth	19 July 1999 (age 26)			(Lao Football Federation) Lao Toyota
18	GK	Kitom Venvongsot	8 June 1999 (age 26)			(Lao Football Federation) Lao Police
2	DF	Sengdaovy Hanthavong	4 October 1998 (age 27)			(Lao Football Federation) National University
8	DF	Mek Insoumang	12 April 1999 (age 26)			(Lao Football Federation)
	DF	Loungleuang Keophouvong				(Lao Football Federation) Young Elephant
14	DF	Chitpasong Latthachack	10 October 1997 (age 28)			(Lao Football Federation)
4	DF	Piyapong Pathammavong	8 September 1998 (age 27)			(Lao Football Federation) Young Elephant
5	DF	Kittisak Phomvongsa	27 July 1999 (age 26)			(Lao Football Federation) Young Elephant
16	DF	Xayasith Singsavang	17 December 2000 (age 25)			(Lao Football Federation) Young Elephant
	DF	{{{name}}}	15 July 1998 (age 27)			(Lao Football Federation) Young Elephant
17	MF	{{{name}}}	29 November 2000 (age 25)			(Lao Football Federation) Young Elephant
	MF	Tiny Bounmalay*	6 June 1993 (age 32)			(Lao Football Federation) Lao Police
23	MF	Phouthone Innalay*	10 October 1993 (age 32)			(Lao Football Federation) Lao Toyota
	MF	Thanongsak Homlathsamee	14 January 1998 (age 28)			(Lao Football Federation) Lanexang United
	MF	Phoutthasay Khochalern*	29 December 1995 (age 30)			(Lao Football Federation) Lao Police
22	MF	Phithack Kongmathilath* (Captain)	6 August 1996 (age 29)			(Lao Football Federation) Lao Toyota
7	MF	Lathasay Lounlasy	29 March 1998 (age 27)			(Lao Football Federation) Lao Toyota
13	MF	Soulivanh Nivone				(Lao Football Federation) Young Elephant
11	MF	Chansamone Phommalyvong	6 April 1998 (age 27)			(Lao Football Federation) Young Elephant
19	MF	Kydavone Souvanny	21 December 1999 (age 26)			(Lao Football Federation) Lao Police
9	FW	Soukchinda Natphasouk*	30 October 1995 (age 30)			(Lao Football Federation) Lao Police
6	FW	Somxay Keohanam	27 July 1998 (age 27)			(Lao Football Federation) Young Elephant
10	FW	Kaharn Phetsivilay				(Lao Football Federation)
	FW	Thatsaphone Saysouk	12 September 2000 (age 25)			(Lao Football Federation)
