= 2014 AFC U-19 Championship squads =

Football tournament squads

Player names marked in bold went on to earn full international caps.

== Group A ==
=== Iran ===
Head coach: Ali Doustimehr

No.	Pos.	Player	Date of birth (age)	Caps	Goals	Club
	GK	**Payam Niazmand**	6 April 1995 (age 31)	7	0	(Football Federation Islamic Republic of Iran) Paykan
	GK	Mehdi Amini	16 May 1996 (age 30)	3	0	(Football Federation Islamic Republic of Iran) Sepahan
	GK	Ahmad Gohari	12 January 1996 (age 30)	0	0	(Football Federation Islamic Republic of Iran) Naft Tehran
	DF	Meysam Joudaki	24 January 1995 (age 31)	9	1	(Football Federation Islamic Republic of Iran) Naft Tehran
	DF	Mohammad Roshandel	2 July 1995 (age 31)	7	0	(Football Federation Islamic Republic of Iran) Sepahan
	DF	**Majid Hosseini**	20 June 1996 (age 30)	5	0	(Football Federation Islamic Republic of Iran) Saipa
	DF	Sasan Jafarikia	17 September 1996 (age 30)	0	0	(Football Federation Islamic Republic of Iran) Foolad
	DF	Komeil Haghzadeh	25 February 1997 (age 29)	0	0	(Football Federation Islamic Republic of Iran) Foolad
	MF	**Armin Sohrabian**	3 February 1995 (age 31)	10	3	(Football Federation Islamic Republic of Iran) Sepahan
	MF	**Milad Sarlak**	20 June 1996 (age 30)	8	2	(Football Federation Islamic Republic of Iran) Sepahan
	MF	Sadegh Moharrami	1 March 1996 (age 30)	5	0	(Football Federation Islamic Republic of Iran) Malavan
	MF	**Saeid Ezzatollahi**	1 October 1996 (age 30)	2	1	(Royal Spanish Football Federation) Atlético Madrid Youth
	MF	Mohsen Aghaei	18 January 1995 (age 31)	2	0	(Football Federation Islamic Republic of Iran) Sepahan
	MF	**Ali Gholizadeh**	10 March 1996 (age 30)	1	1	(Football Federation Islamic Republic of Iran) Saipa
	MF	Mohammadreza Bazaj	30 March 1996 (age 30)	1	1	(Football Federation Islamic Republic of Iran) Padideh
	MF	Hossein Mehraban	12 May 1996 (age 30)	0	0	(Football Federation Islamic Republic of Iran) Tablighat Asar
	MF	Ali Hazzami	25 February 1996 (age 30)	0	0	(Football Federation Islamic Republic of Iran) Foolad
	FW	Siavash Hagh Nazari	3 August 1995 (age 31)	8	0	(Football Federation Islamic Republic of Iran) Persepolis
	FW	**Saeid Aghaei**	9 February 1995 (age 31)	7	2	(Football Federation Islamic Republic of Iran) Tractor Sazi
	FW	Ali Fathian	10 February 1995 (age 31)	6	4	(Football Federation Islamic Republic of Iran) Fajr Sepasi
	FW	Yousef Seyyedi	8 March 1996 (age 30)	5	2	(Football Federation Islamic Republic of Iran) Gostaresh Foulad
	FW	Amir Mohammad Mazloum	27 January 1996 (age 30)	0	0	(Football Federation Islamic Republic of Iran) Damash
	FW	Mahan Rahmani	15 June 1996 (age 30)	0	0	(Football Federation Islamic Republic of Iran) Saipa

=== Myanmar ===
Head coach: (Germany) Gerd Zeise

No.	Pos.	Player	Date of birth (age)	Caps	Goals	Club
1	GK	**Myo Min Latt**	20 February 1995 (age 31)			(Myanmar Football Federation) Zeyar Shwe Myay
12	GK	Pyae Sone Chit				(Myanmar Football Federation) Yadanarbon Youth
18	GK	Thant Zin Nyo				(Myanmar Football Federation) Yadanarbon Youth
3	DF	**Htike Htike Aung**	1 February 1995 (age 31)			(Myanmar Football Federation) Ayeyawady United
4	DF	**Naing Lin Tun**	16 June 1995 (age 31)			(Myanmar Football Federation) Magway
5	DF	**Nanda Kyaw** (c)	3 September 1996 (age 30)			(Myanmar Football Federation) Magway
13	DF	Aung Hein Soe Oo				(Myanmar Football Federation) Yadanarbon Youth
14	DF	Nan Wai Min	1 January 1995 (age 31)			(Myanmar Football Federation) Yangon United Youth
17	DF	**Thiha Htet Aung**				(Myanmar Football Federation) Zeyar Shwe Myay Youth
20	DF	Ye Yint Aung				(Myanmar Football Federation) MFF Mandalay Academy
23		**Myo Ko Tun**	12 March 1995 (age 31)			(Myanmar Football Federation) Yadanarbon Youth
2	MF	Yan Lin Aung				(Myanmar Football Federation) Yangon United Youth
6	MF	**Kyaw Min Oo**	16 June 1996 (age 30)			(Myanmar Football Federation) Ayeyawady United
7	MF	**Nyein Chan Aung**	18 August 1996 (age 30)			(Myanmar Football Federation) Manaw Myay
15	MF	**Yan Naing Oo**	31 March 1996 (age 30)			(Myanmar Football Federation) Zeyar Shwe Myay
16	MF	**Maung Maung Lwin**	18 June 1995 (age 31)			(Myanmar Football Federation) Hantharwady United
19	MF	Chit Hla Aung	20 October 1995 (age 30)			(Myanmar Football Federation) Kanbawza Youth
21	MF	Swan Htet Aung	18 September 1995 (age 31)			(Myanmar Football Federation) Yangon United
22	MF	Shwe Win Tun	22 January 1995 (age 31)			(Myanmar Football Federation) Nay Pyi Taw
8	FW	**Maung Maung Soe**	6 August 1995 (age 31)			(Myanmar Football Federation) Magway
9	FW	**Aung Thu**	22 May 1996 (age 30)			(Myanmar Football Federation) Yadanarbon
10	FW	**Shine Thura**	10 March 1996 (age 30)			(Myanmar Football Federation) Yadanarbon
11	FW	**Than Paing**	6 December 1996 (age 29)			(Myanmar Football Federation) Yangon United Youth

=== Thailand ===
Head coach: Sasom Pobprasert

No.	Pos.	Player	Date of birth (age)	Caps	Goals	Club
1	GK	Anusith Termmee	19 January 1995 (aged 19)	4	0	(Football Association of Thailand) Bangkok United
18	GK	Rattanai Songsangchan	10 June 1995 (aged 19)	11	0	(Football Association of Thailand) Police United
22	GK	Peerapong Ruennin	14 September 1995 (aged 19)	0	0	(Football Association of Thailand) Rangsit University
12	DF	Kiattisak Toopkhuntod (Captain)	19 February 1995 (aged 19)	13	0	(Football Association of Thailand) Samut Songkhram
13	DF	Kullachat Jeentanorm	3 April 1995 (aged 19)	12	3	(Football Association of Thailand) Buriram United U-19
14	DF	Nitipong Sanmahung	4 March 1995 (aged 19)	4	0	(Football Association of Thailand) Air Force Central U-19
15	DF	**Santipharp Chan-ngom**	23 September 1996 (aged 18)	2	0	(Football Association of Thailand) Bangkok Christian College
16	DF	**Shinnaphat Leeaoh**	2 February 1997 (aged 17)	6	0	(Football Association of Thailand) Assumption United
17	DF	Suporn Peenagatapho	12 July 1995 (aged 19)	11	0	(Football Association of Thailand) Muangthong United U-19
19	DF	Supravee Miprathang	19 July 1996 (aged 18)	10	0	(Football Association of Thailand) Muangthong United U-19
20	DF	Worawut Namvech	4 July 1995 (aged 19)	7	0	(Football Association of Thailand) Rangsit
23	DF	**Jenphob Phokhi**	4 April 1996 (aged 18)	6	2	(Football Association of Thailand) Suphanburi U-19
4	MF	**Chaowat Veerachat**	23 June 1996 (aged 18)	11	2	(Football Association of Thailand) Buriram United
5	MF	Sansern Limwattana	31 July 1997 (aged 17)	4	0	(Football Association of Thailand) Sriracha
6	MF	Atthawit Sukchuai	13 March 1996 (aged 18)	13	3	(Football Association of Thailand) Ratchaburi
7	MF	**Nopphon Ponkam**	19 July 1996 (aged 18)	11	2	(Football Association of Thailand) BCC Tero
8	MF	Patiphan Pinsermsootsri	3 October 1996 (aged 18)	12	6	(Football Association of Thailand) Assumption United
9	MF	**Phitiwat Sukjitthammakul**	1 February 1995 (aged 19)	12	1	(Football Association of Thailand) Muangthong United U-19
10	MF	Prasit Jantum	30 April 1995 (aged 19)	6	1	(Football Association of Thailand) Suphanburi
11	MF	Thanasit Siriphala	9 August 1995 (aged 19)	7	1	(Football Association of Thailand) Bangkok Glass
2	FW	**Chenrop Samphaodi**	2 June 1995 (aged 19)	13	8	(Football Association of Thailand) BCC Tero
3	FW	Sittichok Kannoo	9 August 1996 (aged 18)	8	3	(Football Association of Thailand) Buriram United U-19
21	FW	Piyapong Homkajorn	14 February 1996 (aged 18)	5	1	(Football Association of Thailand) Buriram United U-19

=== Yemen ===
Head coach: Ahmed Ali Qasem

== Group B ==
=== Australia ===
Head coach: Paul Okon

No.	Pos.	Player	Date of birth (age)	Caps	Goals	Club
1	GK	Anthony Bouzanis	1 November 1995 (age 30)	1	0	(Football Australia) Sydney FC
	GK	Paul Izzo	6 January 1995 (age 31)	12	0	(Football Australia) Adelaide United
18	GK	Jordan Thurtell	8 July 1996 (age 30)	3	0	(Football Australia) Perth Glory
17	DF	Daniel Alessi	26 August 1997 (age 29)	5	0	(Football Australia) Western Sydney Wanderers
4	DF	Shayne D'Cunha	1 April 1996 (age 30)	3	0	(Football Australia) Blacktown City
5	DF	Scott Galloway	10 April 1995 (age 31)	12	1	(Football Australia) Melbourne Victory
	DF	Dylan Murnane	18 January 1995 (age 31)	0	0	(Football Australia) Melbourne Victory
22	DF	Ben Warland	1 January 1997 (age 29)	3	0	(Football Australia) Adelaide United
	DF	Riley Woodcock	1 January 1995 (age 31)	3	0	(Football Australia) Perth Glory
	DF	Mark Ochieng	9 December 1996 (age 29)	0	0	(Football Australia) Adelaide United
	DF	**Cameron Burgess**	21 October 1995 (age 30)	0	0	(The Football Association) Fulham
19	MF	Shannon Brady	21 June 1995 (age 31)	3	0	(Football Australia) Brisbane Roar
16	MF	Jordan Brown	14 August 1996 (age 30)	3	0	(Football Australia) Melbourne Victory
14	MF	Daniel De Silva	6 March 1997 (age 29)	12	2	(Football Australia) Perth Glory
	MF	Hagi Gligor	8 April 1995 (age 31)	7	0	(Football Australia) Sydney FC
	MF	**Chris Ikonomidis**	4 May 1995 (age 31)	3	2	(Italian Football Federation) Lazio
10	MF	Stefan Mauk	12 November 1995 (age 30)	8	1	(Football Australia) Melbourne City
8	MF	Chris Naumoff	29 June 1995 (age 31)	6	0	(Football Australia) Sydney FC
7	FW	**Brandon Borrello**	25 June 1995 (age 31)	5	0	(Football Australia) Brisbane Roar
20	FW	**Awer Mabil**	15 September 1995 (age 31)	5	4	(Football Australia) Adelaide United
2	FW	Liam Rose	1 April 1997 (age 29)	3	0	(Football Australia) Central Coast Mariners
11	FW	Peter Skapetis	13 January 1995 (age 31)	4	6	(The Football Association) Stoke City
9	FW	Jaushua Sotirio	11 October 1995 (age 30)	4	0	(Football Australia) Western Sydney Wanderers

=== Indonesia ===
Head coach: Indra Sjafri

No.	Pos.	Player	Date of birth (age)	Caps	Goals	Club
1	GK	Ravi Murdianto	8 January 1995 (aged 19)	22	0	(Football Association of Indonesia) Mitra Kukar
2	DF	**I Putu Gede Juni Antara**	7 June 1995 (aged 19)	32	2	(Football Association of Indonesia) Persebaya Surabaya
3	DF	Febly Gushendra	24 February 1995 (aged 19)	4	0	Unattached
4	DF	Mahdi Fahri Albaar	27 September 1996 (aged 18)	11	0	(Football Association of Indonesia) Mitra Kukar
5	DF	Muhammad Fatchurohman	28 June 1995 (aged 19)	36	2	(Football Association of Indonesia) Persebaya Surabaya
6	MF	**Evan Dimas** (Captain)	13 March 1995 (aged 19)	40	20	(Football Association of Indonesia) Persebaya Surabaya
7	FW	**Dimas Drajad**	30 March 1997 (aged 17)	24	14	(Football Association of Indonesia) Gresik United
8	MF	**Muhammad Hargianto**	24 July 1996 (aged 18)	30	5	(Football Association of Indonesia) Persebaya Surabaya
9	FW	Dinan Yahdian Javier	6 April 1995 (aged 19)	17	1	(Football Association of Indonesia) Mitra Kukar
10	FW	Muchlis Hadi Ning Syaifulloh	26 October 1996 (aged 18)	32	12	(Football Association of Indonesia) PSM Makassar
11	MF	Hendra Sandi	10 February 1995 (aged 19)	16	1	(Football Association of Indonesia) Persiraja Banda Aceh
12	GK	**Dicky Indrayana**	4 June 1997 (aged 17)	0	0	(Football Association of Indonesia) PSGC Ciamis
13	DF	Muhammad Sahrul Kurniawan	5 June 1995 (aged 19)	35	0	(Football Association of Indonesia) Persebaya Surabaya
14	DF	**Ricky Fajrin**	6 September 1995 (aged 19)	2	0	(Football Association of Indonesia) Berlian Rajawali
15	FW	Maldini Pali	27 January 1995 (aged 19)	35	1	(Football Association of Indonesia) PSM Makassar
16	DF	**Hansamu Yama Pranata** (Vice-Captain)	16 January 1995 (aged 19)	39	2	(Football Association of Indonesia) Barito Putera
17	MF	**Paulo Sitanggang**	17 October 1995 (aged 19)	29	4	(Football Association of Indonesia) Jember United
18	DF	**Yanto Basna**	12 June 1995 (aged 19)	0	0	(Football Association of Indonesia) Sriwijaya U-21
19	MF	**Zulfiandi**	17 July 1995 (aged 19)	27	1	(Football Association of Indonesia) Persebaya Surabaya
20	FW	**Ilham Udin Armaiyn**	10 May 1996 (aged 18)	38	16	(Football Association of Indonesia) Persebaya Surabaya
21	MF	**Ichsan Kurniawan**	25 December 1995 (aged 18)	7	0	(Football Association of Indonesia) Sriwijaya U-21
22	GK	Rully Desrian	19 December 1996 (aged 17)	1	0	(Football Association of Indonesia) Semen Padang U-21
23	FW	**Septian David Maulana**	1 September 1996 (aged 18)	16	9	(Football Association of Indonesia) Mitra Kukar

=== United Arab Emirates ===
Head coach: Abdulla Mesfer

=== Uzbekistan ===
Head coach: Ravshan Khaydarov

No.	Pos.	Player	Date of birth (age)	Caps	Goals	Club
1	GK	**Botirali Ergashev**	23 June 1995 (aged 19)			(Uzbekistan Football Association) Pakhtakor
2	DF	**Rustam Ashurmatov**	7 July 1996 (aged 18)			(Uzbekistan Football Association) Kokand 1912
3	DF	Ibrokhim Abdullayev	5 December 1996 (age 29)			(Uzbekistan Football Association) Pakhtakor
4	MF	Mirjamol Qosimov	24 September 1995 (aged 19)			(Uzbekistan Football Association) Bunyodkor
5	DF	Odil Khamrobekov	13 February 1996 (aged 18)			(Uzbekistan Football Association) Nasaf Qarshi
6	DF	Akrom Komilov	14 March 1996 (aged 18)			(Uzbekistan Football Association) Bunyodkor
7	MF	**Jamshid Boltaboev**	13 October 1996 (aged 17)			(Uzbekistan Football Association) Pakhtakor
8	DF	**Javokhir Sokhibov** (c)	3 January 1995 (aged 19)			(Uzbekistan Football Association) Pakhtakor
9	FW	**Eldor Shomurodov**	29 June 1995 (aged 19)			(Uzbekistan Football Association) Mashal Mubarek
10	MF	**Otabek Shukurov**	22 June 1996 (aged 18)			(Uzbekistan Football Association) Mashal Mubarek
11	FW	Asliddin Abdiev	14 May 1995 (aged 19)			(Uzbekistan Football Association) Mashal Mubarek
12	GK	Dilshod Khamraev	11 July 1995 (aged 19)			(Uzbekistan Football Association) Qizilqum
13	MF	Ilkhomjon Abdughaniev	19 September 1996 (aged 18)			(Uzbekistan Football Association) Pakhtakor
14	DF	Firdavs Abdusalimov	24 April 1995 (aged 19)			(Uzbekistan Football Association) Dinamo Samarkand
15	MF	Babur Davlatov	1 March 1996 (aged 18)			(Russian Football Union) Rubin Kazan
16	MF	Sardorbek Azimov	1 June 1995 (aged 19)			(Uzbekistan Football Association) Bunyodkor
17	FW	**Dostonbek Khamdamov**	24 July 1996 (aged 18)			(Uzbekistan Football Association) Bunyodkor
18	MF	Ravshanbek Khursandov	12 August 1996 (aged 18)			(Uzbekistan Football Association) Pakhtakor
19	FW	**Zabikhillo Urinboev**	30 March 1995 (aged 19)			(Uzbekistan Football Association) Bunyodkor
20	DF	Dostonbek Tursunov	13 June 1995 (aged 19)			(Uzbekistan Football Association) Neftchi
21	GK	Sarvar Karimov	25 December 1996 (aged 17)			(Uzbekistan Football Association) Lokomotiv
22	MF	Javokhir Siddiqov	8 December 1996 (aged 17)			(Uzbekistan Football Association) Pakhtakor
23	DF	Khurshid Ghiyasov	13 April 1995 (aged 19)			(Uzbekistan Football Association) Bunyodkor

== Group C ==
=== China ===
Head coach: Zheng Xiong

No.	Pos.	Player	Date of birth (age)	Caps	Goals	Club
1	GK	Zhou Yuchen	12 January 1995 (aged 19)			(Portuguese Football Federation) SG Sacavenense
2	DF	Fu Yunlong	18 March 1995 (aged 19)			(Chinese Football Association) Guangzhou R&F
3	DF	Liu Junshuai	10 January 1995 (aged 19)			(Portuguese Football Federation) Atlético Clube do Cacém
4	DF	Huang Jiajun	19 August 1995 (aged 19)			(Portuguese Football Federation) SG Sacavenense
5	DF	**Gao Zhunyi**	21 August 1995 (aged 19)			(Japan Football Association) Kataller Toyama
6	MF	Yan Zihao	18 January 1995 (aged 19)			(Portuguese Football Federation) Sporting CP B
7	MF	**Wei Shihao**	8 April 1995 (aged 19)			(Portuguese Football Federation) Boavista
8	MF	**Cheng Jin**	18 February 1995 (aged 19)			(Chinese Football Association) Hangzhou Greentown
9	FW	Xiang Baixu	9 August 1995 (aged 19)			(French Football Federation) Saint-Étienne B
10	MF	**Zhang Xiuwei**	13 March 1996 (aged 18)			(French Football Federation) Olympique Lyonnais B
11	MF	Tang Shi	24 January 1995 (aged 19)			(Brazilian Football Confederation) Botafogo
12	MF	Wei Jingzong	28 January 1995 (aged 19)			Unattached
13	FW	Lü Pin	3 May 1995 (aged 19)			(Chinese Football Association) Shanghai Greenland
14	MF	**Yao Junsheng**	29 October 1995 (aged 18)			(Portuguese Football Federation) Sport União Sintrense
15	DF	**Ming Tian**	18 April 1995 (aged 19)			(Chinese Football Association) Wuhan Zall
16	FW	Gui Hong	15 January 1995 (aged 19)			(Royal Spanish Football Federation) Sevilla FC C
17	DF	Xiang Hantian	21 November 1995 (aged 18)			(Chinese Football Association) Guizhou Renhe
18	MF	Chen Kerui	9 March 1996 (aged 18)			(Portuguese Football Federation) Os Belenenses U19
19	MF	Long Wei	22 January 1995 (aged 19)			(Chinese Football Association) Wuhan Zall
20	MF	Chen Zhechao	19 April 1995 (aged 19)			(Portuguese Football Federation) SG Sacavenense
21	DF	Chen Zepeng	18 May 1996 (aged 18)			(Chinese Football Association) Guangzhou R&F
22	GK	Jia Xinyao	21 February 1995 (aged 19)			(Chinese Football Association) Wuhan Zall
23	GK	Zhao Tianci	20 March 1995 (aged 19)			(Chinese Football Association) Guangzhou Evergrande

=== Japan ===
Head coach: Masakazu Suzuki

No.	Pos.	Player	Date of birth (age)	Caps	Goals	Club
1	GK	**Kosuke Nakamura**	27 February 1995 (aged 19)			(Japan Football Association) Kashiwa Reysol
2	DF	Rikuto Hirose	23 September 1995 (aged 19)			(Japan Football Association) Mito HollyHock
3	DF	**Genta Miura**	1 March 1995 (aged 19)			(Japan Football Association) Shimizu S-Pulse
4	DF	Yuki Uchiyama	7 May 1995 (aged 19)			(Japan Football Association) Consadole Sapporo
5	DF	Kazuya Miyahara	22 March 1996 (aged 18)			(Japan Football Association) Sanfrecce Hiroshima
6	MF	Reo Mochizuki	18 January 1995 (aged 19)			(Japan Football Association) Nagoya Grampus
7	MF	**Hayao Kawabe**	8 September 1995 (aged 19)			(Japan Football Association) Sanfrecce Hiroshima
8	MF	Daisuke Takagi	14 October 1995 (aged 18)			(Japan Football Association) Tokyo Verdy
9	FW	**Ado Onaiwu**	8 November 1995 (aged 18)			(Japan Football Association) JEF United
10	MF	Masaya Matsumoto	25 January 1995 (aged 19)			(Japan Football Association) Ōita Trinita
11	FW	Yamato Ochi	12 May 1995 (aged 19)			(Japan Football Association)
12	DF	Shinnosuke Nakatani	24 March 1996 (aged 18)			(Japan Football Association) Kashiwa Reysol
13	FW	**Takumi Minamino**	16 January 1995 (aged 19)			(Japan Football Association) Cerezo Osaka
14	MF	Takahiro Sekine	19 April 1995 (aged 19)			(Japan Football Association) Urawa Red Diamonds
15	FW	Shota Kaneko	2 May 1995 (aged 19)			(Japan Football Association) Shimizu S-Pulse
16	MF	Masaya Okugawa	14 April 1996 (aged 18)			(Japan Football Association)
17	MF	Daisuke Sakai	18 January 1997 (aged 17)			(Japan Football Association) Ōita Trinita
18	GK	Kenshin Yoshimaru	27 March 1996 (aged 18)			(Japan Football Association) Vissel Kobe
19	FW	**Koya Kitagawa**	26 July 1996 (aged 18)			(Japan Football Association) Shimizu S-Pulse
20	MF	**Yosuke Ideguchi**	23 August 1996 (aged 18)			(Japan Football Association) Gamba Osaka
21	DF	Ryoma Ishida	21 June 1996 (aged 18)			(Japan Football Association)
22	DF	Rikiya Motegi	27 September 1996 (aged 18)			(Japan Football Association)
23	GK	Toru Takagiwa	15 April 1995 (aged 19)			(Japan Football Association) Shimizu S-Pulse

=== South Korea ===
Head coach: Kim Sang-ho

No.	Pos.	Player	Date of birth (age)	Caps	Goals	Club
1	GK	Lee Tae-hee	26 April 1995 (aged 19)			(Korea Football Association) Incheon United
2	DF	Park Jae-woo	11 October 1995 (aged 18)			(Korea Football Association) Konkuk University
3	DF	Ko Myung-seok	27 September 1995 (aged 19)			(Korea Football Association) Hong-Ik University
4	DF	Son Ki-ryeon	22 March 1995 (aged 19)			(Korea Football Association) Dankook University
5	DF	Kim Chang-yeon	13 March 1995 (aged 19)			(Korea Football Association) Dongguk University
6	MF	Kim Hyun-wook	22 June 1995 (aged 19)			(Korea Football Association) Hanyang University
7	MF	Lee Jung-bin	11 January 1995 (aged 19)			(Korea Football Association) Incheon University
8	MF	Seol Tae-su	6 February 1995 (aged 19)			(Korea Football Association) University of Ulsan
9	FW	Shim Je-hyuk	5 March 1995 (aged 19)			(Korea Football Association) FC Seoul
10	FW	Kim Kun-hee	22 February 1995 (aged 19)			(Korea Football Association) Korea University
11	FW	Kim Shin	30 March 1995 (aged 19)			(French Football Federation) Olympique Lyonnais B
12	DF	Seo Young-jae	23 May 1995 (aged 19)			(Korea Football Association) Hanyang University
13	DF	Ko Yoon-ho	28 May 1995 (aged 19)			(Korea Football Association) Catholic Kwandong University
14	FW	Seo Myeong-won	19 April 1995 (aged 19)			(Korea Football Association) Daejeon Citizen
15	MF	**Paik Seung-ho**	17 March 1997 (aged 17)			(Royal Spanish Football Federation) FC Barcelona Juvenil A
16	DF	Hwang Ki-wook	10 June 1996 (aged 18)			(Korea Football Association) FC Seoul U-18
17	MF	Kim Seung-ju	31 December 1995 (aged 18)			(United States Soccer Federation) Orange County Blues FC
18	FW	**Hwang Hee-chan**	26 January 1996 (aged 18)			(Korea Football Association) Pohang Steelers U-18
19	FW	Kim Young-gyu	4 January 1995 (aged 19)			(Royal Spanish Football Federation) UD Almería B
20	DF	Im Seung-gyum	26 April 1995 (aged 19)			(Korea Football Association) Korea University
21	GK	Kang Hyun-moo	26 April 1995 (aged 19)			(Korea Football Association) Pohang Steelers
22	DF	Park Min-gyu	10 August 1995 (aged 19)			(Korea Football Association) Honam University
23	GK	Song Young-min	11 March 1995 (aged 19)			(Korea Football Association) Dong-eui University

=== Vietnam ===
Head coach: (France) Graechen Guillaume

No.	Pos.	Player	Date of birth (age)	Caps	Goals	Club
1	GK	Lê Văn Trường	25 December 1995 (aged 18)			(Vietnam Football Federation) Hoang Anh Gia Lai F.C. U-19
2	DF	**Lê Văn Sơn**	20 December 1996 (aged 17)			(Vietnam Football Federation) Hoang Anh Gia Lai – Arsenal JMG Academy
3	DF	Trần Hữu Đông Triều	20 August 1995 (aged 19)			(Vietnam Football Federation) Hoang Anh Gia Lai – Arsenal JMG Academy
4	DF	**Bùi Tiến Dũng**	2 October 1995 (aged 19)			(Vietnam Football Federation) Viettel Football Center
5	DF	Lục Xuân Hưng	15 April 1995 (aged 19)			(Vietnam Football Federation) Thanh Hóa F.C. U-19
6	MF	**Lương Xuân Trường**	28 April 1995 (aged 19)			(Vietnam Football Federation) Hoang Anh Gia Lai – Arsenal JMG Academy
7	DF	**Nguyễn Phong Hồng Duy**	13 June 1996 (aged 18)			(Vietnam Football Federation) Hoang Anh Gia Lai F.C. U-19
8	MF	**Nguyễn Tuấn Anh**	16 May 1995 (aged 19)			(Vietnam Football Federation) Hoang Anh Gia Lai – Arsenal JMG Academy
9	FW	**Nguyễn Văn Toàn**	12 April 1996 (aged 18)			(Vietnam Football Federation) Hoang Anh Gia Lai – Arsenal JMG Academy
10	FW	**Nguyễn Công Phượng**	21 January 1995 (aged 19)			(Vietnam Football Federation) Hoang Anh Gia Lai – Arsenal JMG Academy
11	MF	Phan Thanh Hậu	12 January 1997 (aged 17)			(Vietnam Football Federation) Hoang Anh Gia Lai – Arsenal JMG Academy
12	MF	Phạm Trùm Tỉnh	2 May 1995 (aged 19)			(Vietnam Football Federation) Khánh Hòa F.C. U-19
13	MF	**Trần Minh Vương**	28 March 1995 (aged 19)			(Vietnam Football Federation) Hoang Anh Gia Lai F.C.
14	MF	**Phan Văn Đức**	11 April 1996 (aged 18)			(Vietnam Football Federation) Sông Lam Nghệ An F.C. U-19
15	GK	Trần Minh Toàn	21 January 1996 (aged 18)			(Vietnam Football Federation) Tây Ninh F.C. U-19
16	DF	Nguyễn Hữu Anh Tài	28 February 1996 (aged 18)			(Vietnam Football Federation) Hoang Anh Gia Lai – Arsenal JMG Academy
17	FW	**Hồ Tuấn Tài**	15 June 1995 (aged 19)			(Vietnam Football Federation) Sông Lam Nghệ An F.C. U-19
18	MF	Hoàng Thanh Tùng	19 November 1996 (aged 17)			(Vietnam Football Federation) Hoang Anh Gia Lai – Arsenal JMG Academy
19	MF	Phan Văn Long	1 June 1996 (aged 18)			(Vietnam Football Federation) SHB Đà Nẵng F.C. U-19
20	DF	Trần Anh Thi	14 February 1996 (aged 18)			(Vietnam Football Federation) Tây Ninh F.C. U-19
21	DF	Ksor Úc	9 January 1996 (aged 18)			(Vietnam Football Federation) Hoang Anh Gia Lai – Arsenal JMG Academy
22	GK	**Phí Minh Long**	11 February 1996 (aged 18)			(Vietnam Football Federation) Hà Nội T&T F.C. U-19
23	MF	**Nguyễn Quang Hải**	12 April 1997 (aged 17)			(Vietnam Football Federation) Hà Nội T&T F.C. U-19

== Group D ==
=== Iraq ===
Head coach: Rahim Hameed

No.	Pos.	Player	Date of birth (age)	Club
1	GK	Ali Abdul-Hassan	19 September 1996 (aged 18)	(Iraq Football Association) Al-Talaba
2	DF	Alaa Mhawi	3 June 1996 (aged 18)	(Iraq Football Association) Al-Kahraba
3	DF	Hamza Adnan	8 February 1996 (aged 18)	(Iraq Football Association) Al-Minaa
4	DF	Mahdi Abdul-Zahra	17 March 1996 (aged 18)	(Iraq Football Association) Al-Kahraba
5	DF	Ali Lateef	18 January 1996 (aged 18)	(Iraq Football Association) Diwaniya
6	DF	Ali Qasim	5 March 1996 (aged 18)	(Iraq Football Association) Al-Minaa
7	FW	Sherko Karim	25 May 1996 (aged 18)	(Iraq Football Association) Al-Shorta
8	MF	Bashar Rasan (Captain)	22 December 1996 (aged 17)	(Iraq Football Association) Al-Quwa Al-Jawiya
9	MF	Ahmed Mohsen Ashour	4 January 1996 (aged 18)	(Iraq Football Association) Al-Minaa
10	MF	Mustafa Al-Ameen	19 May 1996 (aged 18)	(Iraq Football Association) Naft Maysan
11	MF	Mohammed Jaffal	1 June 1996 (aged 18)	(Iraq Football Association) Erbil
12	GK	Ahmed Basil	19 August 1996 (aged 18)	(Iraq Football Association) Al-Shorta
13	DF	Ahmad Nadhim	10 July 1996 (aged 18)	(Iraq Football Association) Al-Quwa Al-Jawiya
14	MF	Ali Essam	26 November 1996 (aged 17)	(Iraq Football Association) Diyala
15	MF	Layth Tahseen	11 November 1996 (aged 17)	(Iraq Football Association)
16	DF	Ruslan Hanoon	4 March 1996 (aged 18)	(Iraq Football Association)
17	FW	Emad Mohsin	3 November 1996 (aged 17)	(Iraq Football Association) Al-Quwa Al-Jawiya
18	MF	Nameer Hameed	9 November 1995 (aged 18)	(Iraq Football Association) Al-Karkh
19	FW	Ahmed Abdul-Abbas	28 April 1996 (aged 18)	(Iraq Football Association) Al-Quwa Al-Jawiya
20	FW	Ayman Hussein	22 March 1996 (aged 18)	(Iraq Football Association) Al-Naft
21	DF	Mahmood Ayyal	3 February 1996 (aged 18)	(Iraq Football Association)
22	GK	Haidar Mohammed	23 October 1996 (aged 17)	(Iraq Football Association) Al-Quwa Al-Jawiya
23	MF	Ibrahim Naeem	19 November 1996 (aged 17)	(Iraq Football Association) Al-Shorta

=== North Korea ===
Head coach: An Ye-gun

No.	Pos.	Player	Date of birth (age)	Caps	Goals	Club
1	GK	Cha Jong-hun	19 April 1995 (aged 19)			(DPR Korea Football Association)
2	DF	Jang Kum-nam	5 November 1995 (aged 18)			(DPR Korea Football Association)
3	DF	Min Hyo-song	19 January 1995 (aged 19)			(DPR Korea Football Association)
4	DF	Jon Kum-dong	25 April 1995 (aged 19)			(DPR Korea Football Association)
5	FW	Choe Ju-song	27 January 1996 (aged 18)			(DPR Korea Football Association)
6	DF	Ro Myong-song	2 January 1995 (aged 19)			(DPR Korea Football Association)
7	MF	Kang Nam-gwon	6 March 1995 (aged 19)			(DPR Korea Football Association)
8	MF	Ri Un-chol	13 July 1995 (aged 19)			(DPR Korea Football Association)
9	FW	Kim Yu-song	24 January 1995 (aged 19)			(DPR Korea Football Association)
10	MF	Kim Chol-min	21 September 1995 (aged 19)			(DPR Korea Football Association)
11	FW	Jo Sol-song	27 October 1995 (aged 18)			(DPR Korea Football Association)
12	MF	Kim Kwang-jin	3 July 1995 (aged 19)			(DPR Korea Football Association)
13	MF	Jo Kwang-myong	3 January 1995 (aged 19)			(DPR Korea Football Association)
14	MF	Jin Il-sok	4 January 1995 (aged 19)			(DPR Korea Football Association)
15	DF	Kim Kuk-chol	13 January 1995 (aged 19)			(DPR Korea Football Association)
16	MF	Kim Song-sun	31 December 1995 (aged 18)			(DPR Korea Football Association)
17	DF	Ri Kyong-jin	13 November 1995 (aged 18)			(DPR Korea Football Association)
18	GK	Ri In-hak	1 January 1997 (aged 17)			(DPR Korea Football Association)
19	MF	Choe Song-il	29 September 1995 (aged 19)			(DPR Korea Football Association)
20	FW	So Jong-hyok	1 July 1995 (aged 19)			(DPR Korea Football Association)
21	GK	Son Chol-ryong	12 July 1995 (aged 19)			(DPR Korea Football Association)

=== Oman ===
Head coach: Rasheed Jaber

=== Qatar ===
Head coach: (Spain) Félix Sánchez

No.	Pos.	Player	Date of birth (age)	Caps	Club
1	GK	Yousef Hassan	24 May 1996 (age 30)		(Spain) Villarreal
13	GK	Mohammed Al Bakari	28 March 1997 (age 29)		(Qatar) Lekhwiya
22	GK	Yazan Naim	5 June 1997 (age 29)		(Qatar) Al Sadd
2	DF	Hatim Kamal	9 May 1997 (age 29)		(Qatar) Al Sadd
5	DF	Serigne Abdou	28 February 1995 (age 31)		(Qatar) Al Khor
6	DF	Abdulaziz Mahmoud Al-Khalosi	13 November 1995 (age 30)		(Belgium) Eupen II
12	DF	Jasem Omar	18 April 1995 (age 31)		(Austria) Red Bull Salzburg
16	DF	Tameem Al-Muhaza	21 July 1996 (age 30)		(Spain) Atlético Madrid
17	DF	Salem Al Hajri	10 April 1996 (age 30)		(Qatar) Al Sadd
23	DF	Fahad Al Abdulahman	6 April 1995 (age 31)		(Belgium) Eupen II
4	MF	Abdullah Al-Ahrak	10 May 1997 (age 29)		(Spain) Real Madrid Juvenil B
7	MF	Husam Kamal Hassanin	25 January 1996 (age 30)		(France) Auxerre
8	MF	Ahmed Moein	20 October 1995 (age 30)		(Belgium) Eupen II
15	MF	Abdurahman Enad	6 September 1996 (age 30)		(Qatar) Al Rayyan
18	MF	Assim Omar	22 October 1996 (age 29)		(France) Auxerre
20	MF	Tarek Salman	5 December 1997 (age 28)		(Qatar) Al Wakrah
21	MF	Nasser Ibrahim Al-Nassr	11 May 1995 (age 31)		(Spain) Villarreal
9	FW	Jassem Al-Jalabi	21 February 1996 (age 30)		(France) Auxerre
10	FW	Akram Afif	18 November 1996 (age 29)		(Spain) Sevilla
11	FW	Said Brahmi	26 April 1995 (age 31)		(Qatar) Al Khor
14	FW	Ahmed Al Saadi	2 October 1995 (age 31)		(Belgium) Eupen II
19	FW	Almoez Ali	19 August 1996 (age 30)		(Qatar) Lekhwiya
