= 2014 AFC U-19 Championship qualification =

Tournament details
- Host countries: Qatar; Jordan; Iraq; Iran; Palestine; Hong Kong; Indonesia; Thailand; China
- Dates: 3–12 October 2013
- Teams: 40 (from 1 confederation)

Tournament statistics
- Matches played: 59
- Goals scored: 204 (3.46 per match)
- Top scorer(s): (Vietnam) Nguyễn Công Phượng (7 goals)

The 2014 AFC U-19 Championship qualification was the qualification round for the 2014 AFC U-19 Championship, which took place in Myanmar. The draw for the qualifiers was held on 26 April 2013 in Kuala Lumpur, Malaysia.

== Format ==
A total of 40 teams entered the qualification tournament and were drawn into nine groups of five or four teams. West Zone, containing teams from West Asia and South/Central Asia, had two groups of five teams and three groups of four teams, while East Zone, containing teams from East Asia and ASEAN, had two groups of five teams and two groups of four teams. The teams were seeded according to their performance in the previous season in 2012. After playing each other once at a centralised venue, the nine group winners and best six runners-up from all groups qualified for the final tournament.

	Pot 1	Pot 2	Pot 3	Pot 4	Pot 5
West Zone (Groups A–E)	Iran Iraq Jordan Uzbekistan Syria (W)	Kuwait Oman Qatar Saudi Arabia United Arab Emirates	Bahrain India Lebanon Yemen Pakistan	Bangladesh Maldives Palestine Tajikistan Turkmenistan	Afghanistan Nepal
East Zone (Groups F–I)	Australia Japan North Korea South Korea	China Indonesia Thailand Vietnam	Chinese Taipei Laos Malaysia Singapore	Brunei Macau Guam (W)	Mongolia (W) Hong Kong Philippines

- Myanmar automatically qualified for the finals as hosts.
- The following teams did not enter:
  - Bhutan
  - Cambodia
  - Kyrgyzstan
  - Northern Mariana Islands
  - Sri Lanka
  - Timor-Leste

== Player eligibility ==
Players born on or after 1 January 1995 were eligible to compete in the qualification tournament.

== Tiebreakers ==
If two or more teams were equal on points on completion of the group matches, the following criteria were applied to determine the rankings.

1. Greater number of points obtained in the group matches between the teams concerned;
2. Goal difference resulting from the group matches between the teams concerned;
3. Greater number of goals scored in the group matches between the teams concerned;
4. Goal difference in all the group matches;
5. Greater number of goals scored in all the group matches;
6. Kicks from the penalty mark if only two teams are involved and they are both on the field of play;
7. Fewer score calculated according to the number of yellow and red cards received in the group matches;
8. Drawing of lots.

== Groups ==
=== Group A ===
- Matches were played in Qatar (UTC+3).

Team	Pld	W	D	L	GF	GA	GD	Pts
Qatar (H)	4	4	0	0	13	1	+12	12
Uzbekistan	4	3	0	1	10	2	+8	9
India	4	1	1	2	3	7	−4	4
Turkmenistan	4	1	1	2	4	11	−7	4
Nepal	4	0	0	4	1	10	−9	0

4 October 2013
16:30

Nepal	1–2	Turkmenistan
Karki 16'	Report	Berenow 58' (pen.); Kowusow 79'

Qatar SC Stadium, Doha
Attendance: 4,300
Referee: Fahad Al-Mirdasi (Saudi Arabia)
4 October 2013
19:00

India	0–2	Qatar
	Report	Afif 61' (pen.); Kamal 89'

Qatar SC Stadium, Doha
Attendance: 1,818
Referee: Ali Shaban (Kuwait)

6 October 2013
16:30

Turkmenistan	0–1	Uzbekistan
	Report	Sidorov 77'

Qatar SC Stadium, Doha
Attendance: 559
Referee: Mukhtar Al Yarimi (Yemen)
6 October 2013
19:00

Nepal	0–1	India
	Report	Faiaz 86'

Qatar SC Stadium, Doha
Attendance: 5,000
Referee: Dmitriy Mashentsev (Kyrgyzstan)

8 October 2013
16:30

Uzbekistan	5–0	Nepal
Normurodov 14'; Shomurodov 35', 62', 71'; Davlatov 49' (pen.)	Report

Qatar SC Stadium, Doha
Attendance: 580
Referee: Ali Shaban (Kuwait)
8 October 2013
19:00

Qatar	7–0	Turkmenistan
Al-Nassr 10', 23', 55'; Al-Jalabi 29'; Al Saadi 66', 85'; Thiam 89'	Report

Qatar SC Stadium, Doha
Attendance: 345
Referee: Fahad Al-Mirdasi (Saudi Arabia)

10 October 2013
16:30

India	0–3	Uzbekistan
	Report	Abdiev 44', 63'; Davlatov 51'

Qatar SC Stadium, Doha
Attendance: 304
Referee: Mukhtar Al Yarimi (Yemen)
10 October 2013
19:00

Qatar	2–0	Nepal
Al-Nassr 57'; Kamal 72'	Report

Palembang SC Stadium, Palembang
Attendance: 3,200
Referee: Dmitriy Mashentsev (Kyrgyzstan)

12 October 2013
16:30

Turkmenistan	2–2	India
Berenow 9' (pen.); Kovusov 85'	Report	Golui 48'; U. Singh 84'

Qatar SC Stadium, Doha
Attendance: 450
Referee: Ali Shaban (Kuwait)
12 October 2013
19:00

Uzbekistan	1–2	Qatar
Urinboev 85'	Report	Afif 23', 56' (pen.)

Qatar SC Stadium, Doha
Attendance: 250
Referee: Fahad Al-Mirdasi (Saudi Arabia)

=== Group B ===
- Matches were played in Jordan (UTC+3).

Team	Pld	W	D	L	GF	GA	GD	Pts
United Arab Emirates	4	4	0	0	15	1	+14	12
Yemen	4	3	0	1	9	3	+6	9
Jordan (H)	4	1	1	2	3	5	−2	4
Maldives	4	1	1	2	1	8	−7	4
Afghanistan	4	0	0	4	1	12	−11	0

4 October 2013
15:30

Afghanistan	0–1	Maldives
	Report	Rizuvan 45+2'

Prince Mohammad International Stadium, Zarqa
Attendance: 100
Referee: Timur Faizullin (Kyrgyzstan)
4 October 2013
18:00

Yemen	1–2	United Arab Emirates
Mahdi 90+1'	Report	Al-Blooshi 31'; Rabee 45+1'

Amman International Stadium, Amman
Attendance: 90
Referee: Yousef Al-Marzouq (Kuwait)

6 October 2013
15:30

Afghanistan	0–3	Yemen
	Report	Hafeedh 45+1'; Hezam 69'; Al-Mufti 90+2'

Prince Mohammad International Stadium, Zarqa
Attendance: 30
Referee: Yaqoob Abdul Baki (Oman)
6 October 2013
18:00

Maldives	0–0	Jordan
	Report

Amman International Stadium, Amman
Attendance: 200
Referee: Tayeb Shamsuzzaman (Bangladesh)

8 October 2013
15:30

United Arab Emirates	5–0	Maldives
Al-Hashmi 8'; Ghanem 38'; Shawkan 50'; Mubarak 57' (pen.); Salmeen 70'	Report

Prince Mohammad International Stadium, Zarqa
Attendance: 70
Referee: Marai Al-Awaji (Saudi Arabia)
8 October 2013
18:00

Jordan	2–1	Afghanistan
Faisal 2', 66'	Report	Abdulsatar 90+2'

Amman International Stadium, Amman
Attendance: 50
Referee: Timur Faizullin (Kyrgyzstan)

10 October 2013
15:30

United Arab Emirates	6–0	Afghanistan
Mubarak 24' (pen.); Al-Hajri 41' (pen.); Shawkan 44'; Al-Hashmi 55' (pen.); Rabee 74'; Abdulbasit 81' (pen.)	Report

Prince Mohammad International Stadium, Zarqa
Attendance: 50
Referee: Yaqoob Abdul Baki (Oman)
10 October 2013
18:00

Yemen	2–1	Jordan
Mahdi 19'; Hezam 79'	Report	Al-Marafi 14'

Amman International Stadium, Amman
Attendance: 250
Referee: Tayeb Shamsuzzaman (Bangladesh)

12 October 2013
15:30

Maldives	0–3	Yemen
	Report	Hezam 8', 83'; Mahdi 60' (pen.)

Prince Mohammad International Stadium, Zarqa
Attendance: 100
Referee: Marai Al-Awaji (Saudi Arabia)
12 October 2013
18:00

Jordan	0–2	United Arab Emirates
	Report	Al-Hashimi 36'; Rabee 47'

Amman International Stadium, Amman
Attendance: 50
Referee: Yousef Al-Marzouq (Kuwait)

=== Group C ===
- Matches were played in Iraq (UTC+3).

Team	Pld	W	D	L	GF	GA	GD	Pts
Iraq (H)	3	2	1	0	9	0	+9	7
Bangladesh	3	1	1	1	1	6	−5	4
Kuwait	3	1	1	1	3	2	+1	4
Pakistan	3	0	1	2	1	6	−5	1

8 October 2013
13:00

Kuwait	3–1	Pakistan
Al Harbi 7', 58'; Mubarak 90+3'	Report	Mansoor 88'

Franso Hariri Stadium, Arbil
Attendance: 40
Referee: Charymurat Kurbanov (Turkmenistan)
8 October 2013
17:00

Iraq	6–0	Bangladesh
Mhawi 20'; Karim 26', 35'; Attwan 37'; Rasan 69'; Hussein 81'	Report

Franso Hariri Stadium, Arbil
Attendance: 200
Referee: Fahad Al-Marri (Qatar)

10 October 2013
13:00

Pakistan	0–3	Iraq
	Report	Abdul-Malek 26', 28'; Salam Enad 60'

Franso Hariri Stadium, Arbil
Attendance: 70
Referee: Rysbek Shekerbekov (Kyrgyzstan)
10 October 2013
17:00

Bangladesh	1–0	Kuwait
Rubel 66'	Report

Franso Hariri Stadium, Arbil
Attendance: 100
Referee: Çarymyrat Kurbanow (Turkmenistan)

12 October 2013
13:00

Pakistan	0–0	Bangladesh
	Report

Franso Hariri Stadium, Arbil
Attendance: 50
Referee: Rysbek Shekerbekov (Kyrgyzstan)
12 October 2013
17:00

Iraq	0–0	Kuwait
	Report

Franso Hariri Stadium, Arbil
Attendance: 300
Referee: Fahad Al-Marri (Qatar)

=== Group D ===
- Matches were played in Iran (UTC+3:30).

Team	Pld	W	D	L	GF	GA	GD	Pts
Iran (H)	3	3	0	0	9	1	+8	9
Saudi Arabia	3	2	0	1	7	2	+5	6
Lebanon	3	0	1	2	2	8	−6	1
Tajikistan	3	0	1	2	0	7	−7	1

8 October 2013
13:00

Saudi Arabia	2–1	Lebanon
Al-Shehri 74' (pen.); Al-Mushayt 76'	Report	Ali Chehab 45+1'

Kerman Municipal Stadium, Kerman
Attendance: 100
Referee: Hettikamkanamge Perera (Sri Lanka)
8 October 2013
17:30

Iran	2–0	Tajikistan
Abdollahzadeh 40'; Fathian 90+2'	Report

Kerman Municipal Stadium, Kerman
Attendance: 500
Referee: Masoud Tufaylieh (Syria)

10 October 2013
13:00

Tajikistan	0–5	Saudi Arabia
	Report	Al-Mushayt 21'; Al-Shamrani 32'; Al Khairi 37'; Al-Shehri 89' (pen.); Al-Jouei 90+1' (pen.)

Kerman Municipal Stadium, Kerman
Attendance: 100
Referee: Murad Al-Zawahreh (Jordan)
10 October 2013
17:30

Lebanon	1–6	Iran
Salem 7' (pen.)	Report	Fathian 2'; Sohrabian 22', 86'; Azmoun 37', 75' (pen.); Sarlak 47'

Kerman Municipal Stadium, Kerman
Attendance: 500
Referee: Khamis Al-Marri (Qatar)

12 October 2013
13:00

Lebanon	0–0	Tajikistan
	Report

Kerman Municipal Stadium, Kerman
Attendance: 50
Referee: Murad Al-Zawahreh (Jordan)
12 October 2013
17:30

Iran	1–0	Saudi Arabia
Aghaei 38'	Report

Kerman Municipal Stadium, Kerman
Attendance: 2,000
Referee: Hettikamkanamge Perera (Sri Lanka)

=== Group E ===
- Matches were played in Palestine (UTC+3).

Team	Pld	W	D	L	GF	GA	GD	Pts
Oman	2	2	0	0	3	0	+3	6
Palestine (H)	2	0	1	1	1	2	−1	1
Bahrain	2	0	1	1	1	3	−2	1
Syria (W)	0	0	0	0	0	0	0	0

(W) Withdrew
8 October 2013
16:00

Oman	2–0	Bahrain
Al Rushadi 34'; Al Khalasi 57' (o.g.)	Report

Faisal Al-Husseini International Stadium, Al-Ram
Attendance: 200
Referee: Mohammad Abu Loum (Jordan)

10 October 2013
17:00

Palestine	0–1	Oman
	Report	Mubarak 76'

Dora International Stadium, Hebron
Attendance: 600
Referee: Mohanad Qasim Sarray (Iraq)

12 October 2013
17:00

Bahrain	1–1	Palestine
Ali Abdulla 56'	Report	Salah 90+1'

Faisal Al-Husseini International Stadium, Al-Ram
Attendance: 100
Referee: Vladislav Tseytlin (Uzbekistan)

=== Group F ===
- Matches were played in Malaysia (UTC+8).

Team	Pld	W	D	L	GF	GA	GD	Pts
Vietnam	3	3	0	0	16	3	+13	9
Australia	3	2	0	1	11	5	+6	6
Hong Kong	3	1	0	2	2	12	−10	3
Chinese Taipei	3	0	0	3	1	10	−9	0
Mongolia (W)	0	0	0	0	0	0	0	0

(W) Withdrew
3 October 2013
17:00

Australia	7–0	Hong Kong
Skapetis 12', 48', 55' (pen.), 87'; Cristaldo 52', 68'; Oxborrow 71'	Report

Kuala Lumpur Stadium, Kuala Lumpur
Attendance: 98
Referee: Jumpei Iida (Japan)
3 October 2013
20:00

Vietnam	6–1	Chinese Taipei
Nguyễn Công Phượng 12', 55', 57'; Nguyễn Văn Toàn 21', 60'; Lâm Ti Phông 87'	Report	Lai Chih-hsuan 89'

Kuala Lumpur Stadium, Kuala Lumpur
Attendance: 150
Referee: Nivon Robesh Gamini (Sri Lanka)

5 October 2013
17:00

Hong Kong	1–5	Vietnam
Tsang Tsz Hin 69'	Report	Nguyễn Công Phượng 10', 68'; Nguyễn Văn Toàn 35'; Lau Hok Ming 44' (o.g.); Lê Văn Sơn 61'

Kuala Lumpur Stadium, Kuala Lumpur
Attendance: 200
Referee: Wang Di (China)
5 October 2013
20:00

Chinese Taipei	0–3	Australia
	Report	Olsen 20'; Ikonomidis 21', 47'

Kuala Lumpur Stadium, Kuala Lumpur
Attendance: 76
Referee: Banjar Al-Dosari (Qatar)

7 October 2013
17:00

Australia	1–5	Vietnam
Skapetis 45+3'	Report	Nguyễn Công Phượng 8', 54'; Hoàng Thanh Tùng 17'; Nguyễn Văn Toàn 44'; Lê Văn Sơn 70' (pen.)

Kuala Lumpur Stadium, Kuala Lumpur
Attendance: 300
Referee: Jumpei Iida (Japan)
7 October 2013
20:00

Chinese Taipei	0–1	Hong Kong
	Report	Law Hiu Chung 90+2'

Kuala Lumpur Stadium, Kuala Lumpur
Attendance: 30
Referee: Nivon Robesh Gamini (Sri Lanka)

=== Group G ===
- Matches were played in Indonesia (UTC+7).

Team	Pld	W	D	L	GF	GA	GD	Pts
Indonesia (H)	3	3	0	0	9	2	+7	9
South Korea	3	2	0	1	11	4	+7	6
Philippines	3	0	1	2	2	8	−6	1
Laos	3	0	1	2	3	11	−8	1
Guam (W)	0	0	0	0	0	0	0	0

(W) Withdrew
8 October 2013
15:30

South Korea	4–0	Philippines
Park In-hyeok 27'; Hwang Hee-chan 50', 71', 77'	Report

Gelora Bung Karno Stadium, Jakarta
Attendance: 2,000
Referee: Mohd Amirul Izwan Yaacob (Malaysia)
8 October 2013
19:30

Indonesia	4–0	Laos
Muchlis 11', 52'; Sitanggang 85'; Evan Dimas 89'	Report

Gelora Bung Karno Stadium, Jakarta
Attendance: 15,000
Referee: Sukhbir Singh (Singapore)

10 October 2013
15:30

Laos	1–5	South Korea
Natphasouk 34'	Report	Hwang Hee-chan 3' (pen.); Seol Tae-su 18'; Lee Jung-bin 29' (pen.), 76', 90'

Gelora Bung Karno Stadium, Jakarta
Attendance: 2,300
Referee: Ng Chiu Kok (Hong Kong)
10 October 2013
19:30

Philippines	0–2	Indonesia
	Report	Hargianto 27'; Yabes 81'

Gelora Bung Karno Stadium, Jakarta
Attendance: 18,000
Referee: Win Cho (Myanmar)

12 October 2013
15:30

Laos	2–2	Philippines
Souksavanh 49'; Ketavong 73'	Report	Calvo 44'; Gadia 90'

Gelora Bung Karno Stadium, Jakarta
Attendance: 15,000
Referee: Win Cho (Myanmar)
12 October 2013
19:30

South Korea	2–3	Indonesia
Seol Tae-su 32' (pen.); Seo Myeong-won 88'	Report	Evan Dimas 30', 49', 86'

Gelora Bung Karno Stadium, Jakarta
Attendance: 50,000
Referee: Mohd Amirul Izwan Yaacob (Malaysia)

=== Group H ===
- Matches were played in Thailand (UTC+7).

Team	Pld	W	D	L	GF	GA	GD	Pts
North Korea	3	3	0	0	12	0	+12	9
Thailand (H)	3	2	0	1	10	2	+8	6
Singapore	3	1	0	2	3	8	−5	3
Brunei	3	0	0	3	1	16	−15	0

8 October 2013
15:00

North Korea	6–0	Brunei
Ro Myong-song 21' (pen.); So Jong-hyok 23'; Kim Chol-min 31'; Choe Song-il 39'; Pak Chol-song 64'; Kim Kuk-chol 90+3'	Report

Thai-Japanese Stadium, Bangkok
Attendance: 300
Referee: Ali Sabah (Iraq)
8 October 2013
18:00

Thailand	3–0	Singapore
Isariya 12', 45+3'; Chenrop 57'	Report

Thai-Japanese Stadium, Bangkok
Attendance: 820
Referee: Ma Ning (China PR)

10 October 2013
15:00

Singapore	0–4	North Korea
	Report	So Jong-hyok 14'; Kim Yu-song 24', 31'; Kang Nam-gwon 29'

Thai-Japanese Stadium, Bangkok
Attendance: 230
Referee: Rowan Arumughan (India)
10 October 2013
18:00

Brunei	0–7	Thailand
	Report	Jansawang 10', 90+4'; Isariya 31'; Kullachat 45+1', 68', 90+2'; Phitiwat 54'

Thai-Japanese Stadium, Bangkok
Attendance: 800
Referee: Mohamed Al-Zarouni (United Arab Emirates)

12 October 2013
15:00

North Korea	2–0	Thailand
So Jong-hyok 10'; Kim Yu-song 61'	Report

Thai-Japanese Stadium, Bangkok
Attendance: 1,000
Referee: Ma Ning (China PR)
12 October 2013
18:00

Singapore	3–1	Brunei
Koh 76', 86'; Tan 83'	Report	Asri 63'

Thai-Japanese Stadium, Bangkok
Attendance: 220
Referee: Ali Sabah (Iraq)

=== Group I ===
- Matches were played in China (UTC+8).

Team	Pld	W	D	L	GF	GA	GD	Pts
Japan	3	2	1	0	12	2	+10	7
China (H)	3	2	1	0	7	2	+5	7
Malaysia	3	1	0	2	7	8	−1	3
Macau	3	0	0	3	0	14	−14	0

8 October 2013
15:00

Japan	6–0	Macau
Kawabe 9'; Oyama 12'; Kaneko 19'; Ochi 44', 59'; Kitagawa 89'	Report

Jiaxing Sports Center Stadium, Jiaxing
Attendance: 150
Referee: Tong Kui Sum (Hong Kong)
8 October 2013
19:35

China	3–1	Malaysia
Xiang Baixu 32', 45'; Wei Shihao 83'	Report	Alif 63'

Jiaxing Sports Center Stadium, Jiaxing
Attendance: 1,580
Referee: Võ Minh Trí (Vietnam)

10 October 2013
15:00

Macau	0–3	China
	Report	Tang Shi 54'; Wang Jinxian 55'; Wei Jinzong 67'

Jiaxing Sports Center Stadium, Jiaxing
Attendance: 3,180
Referee: Muhammad Taqi (Singapore)
10 October 2013
19:35

Malaysia	1–5	Japan
Ariff 38' (pen.)	Report	Ochi 3'; Kaneko 24' (pen.); Miyaichi 77'; Minamino 79'; Miura 86'

Jiaxing Sports Center Stadium, Jiaxing
Attendance: 1,180
Referee: Alireza Faghani (Iran)

12 October 2013
16:30

Malaysia	5–0	Macau
Alif 12'; Irfan 22'; Agku 29'; Raphi 34'; Amirul 81'	Report

Jiaxing Sports Center Stadium, Jiaxing
Attendance: 258
Referee: Võ Minh Trí (Vietnam)
12 October 2013
19:35

Japan	1–1	China
Koyamatsu 53'	Report	Miura 67' (o.g.)

Jiaxing Sports Center Stadium, Jiaxing
Attendance: 9,300
Referee: Tong Kui Sum (Hong Kong)

== Ranking of second-placed teams ==
In order to ensure equality when comparing the runners-up team of all the groups, the results of the matches between the runner-up team and the bottom-placed team (for Groups D, F, G, H and I, which consist of four teams) or two sides from the bottom (for Groups A and B, which consist of five teams) were considered null and void due to Group C and Group E having only three teams participating in the qualifiers.

The best runner-up teams among those ranked second in the groups were determined as follows:

1. Greater number of points obtained from group matches identified by AFC
2. Goal difference resulting from group matches identified by AFC
3. Greater number of goals scored in group matches identified by AFC
4. Fewer number of points calculated according to the number of yellow and red cards received by the team in the group matches identified by AFC
5. Drawing of lots.

Grp	Team	Pld	W	D	L	GF	GA	GD	Pts
I	China	2	1	1	0	4	2	+2	4
F	Australia	2	1	0	1	8	5	+3	3
G	South Korea	2	1	0	1	6	3	+3	3
A	Uzbekistan	2	1	0	1	4	2	+2	3
H	Thailand	2	1	0	1	3	2	+1	3
B	Yemen	2	1	0	1	3	3	0	3
D	Saudi Arabia	2	1	0	1	2	2	0	3
C	Bangladesh	2	1	0	1	1	6	−5	3
E	Palestine	2	0	1	1	1	2	−1	1

== Qualified teams ==
- Australia
- China
- Indonesia
- Iran
- Iraq
- Japan
- Myanmar (hosts)
- Oman
- North Korea
- Qatar
- South Korea
- Thailand
- United Arab Emirates
- Uzbekistan
- Vietnam
- Yemen
