= 2017 International U-21 Thanh Niên Newspaper Cup =

Tournament details
- Host country: Vietnam
- Dates: 12–22 December 2017
- Teams: 5
- Venue: 1 (in 1 host city)

Final positions
- Champions: (Japan) Yokohama U21 (2nd title)
- Runners-up: Vietnam U21
- Third place: Myanmar U21
- Fourth place: Thailand U21

Tournament statistics
- Matches played: 12
- Goals scored: 40 (3.33 per match)
- Top scorer: (Japan) Matsuoka Rimu
- Fair play award: Vietnam U21

The 2017 International U-21 Thanh Niên Newspaper Cup was the 11th edition of the International U-21 Thanh Niên Newspaper Cup, the friendly international youth championship organised by Thanh Niên Newspaper. The championship started on 12 December until 22 December 2017.

== Group stage ==
Pos	Team	Pld	W	D	L	GF	GA	GD	Pts	Qualification
1	(Japan) Yokohama U21	4	3	1	0	12	3	+9	10	Final
2	Vietnam U21	4	2	1	1	8	4	+4	7	Final
3	Myanmar U21	4	1	1	2	2	8	−6	4	Third place play-off
4	Thailand U21	4	1	1	2	4	6	−2	4	Third place play-off
5	Vietnam U19	4	0	2	2	6	11	−5	2	

Updated to match(es) played on unknown. Source:
12 December 2017
16:00 UTC+07:00

Myanmar U21	1–1	Vietnam U19
Aee Soe 49'		Khắc Khiêm 81'

Cần Thơ Stadium, Cần Thơ, Vietnam
Referee: (Indonesia) Dwipurba Adiwicaksono
12 December 2017
18:30 UTC+07:00

Vietnam U21	0–1	Thailand U21
		Settawut Wongsai 43'

Cần Thơ Stadium, Cần Thơ, Vietnam
Referee: (Singapore) Letchman Gopalakrishnan

14 December 2017
16:00 UTC+07:00

Thailand U21	0–1	Myanmar U21
		Hein Htet Aung 40'

Cần Thơ Stadium, Cần Thơ, Vietnam
Referee: (Vietnam) Võ Minh Trí
14 December 2017
18:30 UTC+07:00

Vietnam U19	1–3	(Japan) Yokohama U21
Trần Bảo Toàn 51'		Iizawa 28'; Yamamoto 45'; Abe 77'

Cần Thơ Stadium, Cần Thơ, Vietnam
Referee: (Singapore) Letchman Gopalakrishnan

16 December 2017
16:00 UTC+07:00

(Japan) Yokohama U21	2–0	Thailand U21
Matsuoka 47', 55'

Cần Thơ Stadium, Cần Thơ, Vietnam
Referee: (Vietnam) Hoàng Anh Tuấn
16 December 2017
18:30 UTC+07:00

Vietnam U21	2–0	Myanmar U21
Phan Văn Đức 47'; Lê Văn Sơn 47' (pen.)

Cần Thơ Stadium, Cần Thơ, Vietnam
Referee: (Singapore) Letchman Gopalakrishnan

18 December 2017
16:00 UTC+07:00

Myanmar U21	0–5	(Japan) Yokohama U21
		Hashimoto Kento 19'; Kamiyama Kyousuke 45+1'; Matsuoka 57', 60'; Yamamoto 79'

Cần Thơ Stadium, Cần Thơ, Vietnam
Referee: (Vietnam) Võ Minh Trí
18 December 2017
18:30 UTC+07:00

Vietnam U19	1–4	Vietnam U21
Nguyễn Trần Việt Cường 62'		Trần Ngọc Sơn 4'; Triệu Việt Hưng 40'; Đinh Thanh Bình 61', 63'

Cần Thơ Stadium, Cần Thơ, Vietnam
Referee: (Indonesia) Dwipurba Adiwicaksono

20 December 2017
16:00 UTC+07:00

Thailand U21	3–3	Vietnam U19
Sorawit 24'; Sirimongkhon 32'; Syoya 90+2'		Trương Tiến Anh 24'; Trần Bảo Toàn 29'; Nguyễn Trần Việt Cường 30'

Cần Thơ Stadium, Cần Thơ, Vietnam
Referee: (Indonesia) Dwipurba Adiwicaksono
20 December 2017
18:30 UTC+07:00

(Japan) Yokohama U21	2–2	Vietnam U21
Hashimoto Kento 24'; Saito 90+2' (pen.)		Trần Ngọc Sơn 25'; Lê Văn Sơn 50' (pen.)

Cần Thơ Stadium, Cần Thơ, Vietnam
Referee: (Singapore) Letchman Gopalakrishnan

== Knockout stage ==
=== Third place play-off ===
22 December 2017
16:00 UTC+07:00

Myanmar U21	4–2	Thailand U21
Shwe Ko 2'; Kyaw Myint Win 35', 84'; Aee Soe 86'		Nattawut 22'; Rittidet Phensawat 36'

Cần Thơ Stadium, Cần Thơ, Vietnam
Referee: (Vietnam) Hoàng Anh Tuấn

=== Final ===
22 December 2017
18:30 UTC+07:00

(Japan) Yokohama U21	2–0	Vietnam U21
Maejima 17'; Kamiyama Kyousuke 49'

Cần Thơ Stadium, Cần Thơ, Vietnam
Referee: (Singapore) Letchman Gopalakrishnan

== Goalscorers ==
4 goals

- (Japan) Rimu Matsuoka

2 goals

- (Japan) Ryotaro Yamamoto
- (Japan) Hashimoto Kento
- (Japan) Kamiyama Kyousuke
- (Thailand) Rittidet Phensawat
- (Vietnam) Trần Bảo Toàn
- (Vietnam) Trần Ngọc Sơn
- (Vietnam) Nguyễn Trần Việt Cường
- (Vietnam) Lê Văn Sơn
- (Myanmar) Aee Soe
- (Myanmar) Kyaw Myint Win

1 goals

- (Vietnam) Nguyễn Khắc Khiêm
- (Vietnam) Trương Tiến Anh
- (Vietnam) Triệu Việt Hưng
- (Vietnam) Đinh Thanh Bình
- (Thailand) Settawut Wongsai
- (Thailand) Sorawit Panthong
- (Thailand) Sirimongkhon Jitbanjong
- (Thailand) Nattawut Suksum
- (Japan) Takashi Abe
- (Japan) Yota Maejima
- (Japan) Koki Saito
- (Japan) Saito Kosuke
- (Myanmar) Hein Htet Aung
- (Myanmar) Shwe Ko

== See also ==
- International U-21 Thanh Niên Newspaper Cup
