= Saeed Jassim =

Saeed Jassim may refer to:

- Saeed Jassim (footballer, born 1998)
- Saeed Jassim (footballer, born 1995)
