= 2020 Vietnamese Cup =

Tournament details
- Country: Vietnam
- Dates: 23 May – 20 September
- Teams: 26

Final positions
- Champions: Hà Nội(2 tiles)
- Runners-up: Viettel

Tournament statistics
- Matches played: 25
- Goals scored: 72 (2.88 per match)
- Top goal scorer: (Vietnam) Nguyễn Văn Quyết (5 goals)

The 2020 Vietnamese National Cup (known as the Bamboo Airways National Cup for sponsorship reasons) was the 28th edition of the Vietnamese National Cup, the football knockout tournament of Vietnam organized by the Vietnam Football Federation.

== First round ==
23 May 2020	DNH Nam Định (1)	2 – 0	Hoàng Anh Gia Lai (1)	Nam Định, Nam Định
18:00	Rafaelson 43'; Mai Xuân Quyết 62'	Report		Stadium: Thiên Trường Stadium; Attendance: 15,000; Referee: Nguyễn Đình Thái

24 May 2020	An Giang (2)	2 – 2 (6 - 5 p)	Long An (2)	Long Xuyên, An Giang
15:30	Võ Đình Lâm 32'; Lương Thanh Sang 70'	Report	Trần Hoài Nam 25' (pen.); Đinh Văn Hùng 72'	Stadium: An Giang Stadium; Attendance: 2,000; Referee: Trần Văn Điền

24 May 2020	Huế (2)	0 – 1	SHB Đà Nẵng (1)	Huế
16:00		Report	Hà Đức Chinh 66' (pen.)	Stadium: Tự Do Stadium; Attendance: 3,000; Referee: Lê Đức Cảnh

24 May 2020	Bà Rịa–Vũng Tàu (2)	2 – 1	Sài Gòn (1)	Bà Rịa–Vũng Tàu
17:00	Chu Văn Kiên 61', 72'	Report	Ngô Anh Vũ 87'	Stadium: Bà Rịa Stadium; Referee: Nguyễn Ngọc Châu

24 May 2020	Sông Lam Nghệ An (1)	1 – 0	Bình Định (2)	Vinh, Nghệ An
17:00	Nguyễn Sỹ Nam 60'	Report		Stadium: Vinh Stadium; Referee: Lê Đức Cảnh

25 May 2020	Đồng Tháp (2)	3 – 1	Hải Phòng (1)	Cao Lãnh, Đồng Tháp
15:30	Trương Huỳnh Anh Khoa 6', 10'; Võ Thanh Hậu 67'	Report	Đồng Văn Trung 63'	Stadium: Cao Lãnh Stadium; Attendance: 1,000; Referee: Nguyễn Minh Thuận

25 May 2020	Phố Hiến (2)	1 – 2	Thanh Hóa (1)	Hưng Yên
17:00	Lâm Thuận 89'	Report	Hoàng Vũ Samson 57'; Hoàng Đình Tùng 90+6'	Stadium: PVF Stadium; Attendance: 1,500; Referee: Hoàng Thanh Bình

25 May 2020	Sanna Khánh Hòa BVN (2)	0 – 1	Viettel (1)	Nha Trang, Khánh Hòa
17:00		Report	Nguyễn Việt Phong 82'	Stadium: 19/8 Stadium; Attendance: 3,000; Referee: Vũ Nguyên Vũ

25 May 2020	Bình Phước (2)	2 – 0	Đắk Lắk (2)	Đồng Xoài, Bình Phước
17:00	Hoàng Ngọc Hùng 4', 7'	Report		Stadium: Bình Phước Stadium; Attendance: 1,200; Referee: Nguyễn Văn Tạo

25 May 2020	Hồng Lĩnh Hà Tĩnh (1)	2 – 1	XM Fico-YTL Tây Ninh (2)	Hồng Lĩnh, Hà Tĩnh
18:00	Phạm Tuấn Hải 9' (pen.); Vũ Hữu Quý 84'	Report	Lương Quốc Thắng 6'	Stadium: Hà Tĩnh Stadium; Attendance: 1,500; Referee: Nguyễn Mạnh Hải

== Round of 16 ==
30 May 2020	An Giang (2)	0 – 2	Viettel (1)	An Giang
15:30		Report	Nhâm Mạnh Dũng 70'; Bùi Quang Khải 78'	Stadium: An Giang Stadium; Attendance: 9,000; Referee: Trần Văn Trọng

30 May 2020	Sông Lam Nghệ An (1)	1 – 1 (4 - 5 p)	Bà Rịa–Vũng Tàu (2)	Nghệ An
17:00	Hồ Tuấn Tài 46'	Report	Trần Đình Bảo 16'	Stadium: Vinh; Attendance: 1,500; Referee: Ngô Quốc Hưng

30 May 2020	Than Quảng Ninh (1)	2 – 2 (5 - 4 p)	DNH Nam Định (1)	Quảng Ninh
18:00	Andre Fagan 32'; Jermie Lynch 37'	Report	Rafaelson 39', 41'	Stadium: Cẩm Phả; Attendance: 10,000; Referee: Hoàng Ngọc Hà

30 May 2020	Hồ Chí Minh City (1)	0 – 0 (3 - 2 p)	SHB Đà Nẵng (1)	Hồ Chí Minh City
19:00		Report		Stadium: Thống Nhất; Attendance: 5,000; Referee: Ngô Duy Lân

31 May 2020	Becamex Bình Dương (1)	1 – 0	Thanh Hóa (1)	Thủ Dầu Một, Bình Dương
17:00	Hồ Tấn Tài 73'	Report		Stadium: Gò Đậu Stadium; Attendance: 6,500

31 May 2020	Quảng Nam (1)	0 – 1	Hồng Lĩnh Hà Tĩnh (1)	Tam Kỳ, Quảng Nam
17:00		Report	Mansaray 31'	Stadium: Tam Kỳ Stadium; Attendance: 3,000

31 May 2020	XSKT Cần Thơ (2)	1 – 0	Bình Phước (2)	Cần Thơ
17:00	Dương Văn An 71'	Report		Stadium: Cần Thơ Stadium; Attendance: 1,500

31 May 2020	Hà Nội (1)	3 – 0	Đồng Tháp (2)	Hà Nội
19:00	Nguyễn Văn Dũng 31'; Nguyễn Thành Chung 90+1'; Nguyễn Tuấn Anh 90+3'	Report		Stadium: Hàng Đẫy; Attendance: 6,000

== Quarter–final round ==
11 September 2020	Bà Rịa–Vũng Tàu (2)	2 – 3	Hồ Chí Minh City (1)	Bà Rịa–Vũng Tàu
17:00	Nguyễn Ngọc Hùng 2'; Bùi Văn Đức 11'	Report	Nguyễn Công Phượng 62'; Võ Huy Toàn 81'; Đỗ Văn Thuận 90+4'	Stadium: Bà Rịa Stadium; Attendance: 5,000; Referee: Hoàng Thanh Bình

11 September 2020	Hà Nội (1)	7 – 0	XSKT Cần Thơ (2)	Hà Nội
19:15	Nguyễn Thành Chung 8'; Nguyễn Văn Quyết 13', 35'; Nguyễn Quang Hải 25', 58'; Đỗ Hùng Dũng 55'; Hồ Minh Dĩ 88'	Report		Stadium: Hàng Đẫy; Attendance: 1,500; Referee: Ngô Quốc Hưng

12 September 2020	Hồng Lĩnh Hà Tĩnh (1)	2 – 3	Than Quảng Ninh (1)	Hà Tĩnh
18:00	Mansaray 34'; Bruno Henrique 86'	Report	Jermie Lynch 6'; Phạm Trung Hiếu 45+1'; Giang Trần Quách Tân 63'	Stadium: Hà Tĩnh Stadium; Referee: Nguyễn Mạnh Hải

12 September 2020	Viettel (1)	4 – 1	Becamex Bình Dương (1)	Hà Nội
19:15	Caíque 13'; Hồ Khắc Ngọc 16'; Bruno Cantanhede 19'; Vũ Minh Tuấn 90+3'	Report	Youssouf Touré 25'	Stadium: Hàng Đẫy; Referee: Nguyễn Đình Thái

== Semi-finals ==
16 September 2020	Than Quảng Ninh (1)	1 – 2	Viettel (1)	Quảng Ninh
18:00	Nguyễn Hai Long 87'	Report	Bruno Cantanhede 53'; Bùi Tiến Dũng 90+3'	Stadium: Cẩm Phả; Referee: Hoàng Thanh Bình

16 September 2020	Hà Nội (1)	5 – 1	Hồ Chí Minh City (1)	Hà Nội
19:15	Nguyễn Văn Quyết 45', 75', 90'; Nguyễn Thành Chung 47'; Nguyễn Quang Hải 63'	Report	Đỗ Văn Thuận 49'	Stadium: Hàng Đẫy; Referee: Ngô Duy Lân

== Final ==
20 September 2020	Viettel (1)	1 – 2	Hà Nội (1)	Hà Nội
19:15	Trần Ngọc Sơn 75'	Report	Trương Văn Thái Quý 82'; Nguyễn Quang Hải 89'	Stadium: Hàng Đẫy; Attendance: 4,000

== Brackets ==
First round
25 May 2020
Hồng Lĩnh Hà Tĩnh (1)	2
XM Fico Tây Ninh (2)	1
23 May 2020
Dược Nam Hà Nam Định (1)	2
Hoàng Anh Gia Lai (1)	0
24 May 2020
An Giang (2)	2 (6)
Long An (2)	2 (5)
25 May 2020
Sanna Khánh Hòa (2)	0
Viettel (1)	1
25 May 2020
Phố Hiến (2)	1
Thanh Hóa (1)	2
25 May 2020
Đồng Tháp (2)	3
Hải Phòng (1)	1
25 May 2020
Bình Phước (2)	2
Đắk Lắk (2)	0
24 May 2020
Sông Lam Nghệ An (1)	1
Bình Định (2)	0
24 May 2020
Bà Rịa–Vũng Tàu (2)	2
Sài Gòn (1)	1
24 May 2020
Huế (2)	0
SHB Đà Nẵng (1)	1

Round of 16
31 May 2020
Quảng Nam (1)	0
Hồng Lĩnh Hà Tĩnh (1)	1
30 May 2020
Than Quảng Ninh (1)	2 (5)
Dược Nam Hà Nam Định (1)	2 (4)
30 May 2020
An Giang (2)	0
Viettel (1)	2
31 May 2020
Becamex Bình Dương (1)	1
Thanh Hóa (1)	0
31 May 2020
Hà Nội (1)	3
Đồng Tháp (2)	0
31 May 2020
XSKT Cần Thơ (2)	1
Bình Phước (2)	0
30 May 2020
Sông Lam Nghệ An (1)	1 (4)
Bà Rịa–Vũng Tàu (2)	1 (5)
30 May 2020
TP Hồ Chí Minh (1)	0 (3)
SHB Đà Nẵng (1)	0 (2)

Quarter-Finals
12 September 2020
Hồng Lĩnh Hà Tĩnh (1)	2
Than Quảng Ninh (1)	3
12 September 2020
Viettel (1)	4
Becamex Bình Dương (1)	1
11 September 2020
Hà Nội (1)	7
XSKT Cần Thơ (2)	0
11 September 2020
Bà Rịa–Vũng Tàu (2)	2
TP Hồ Chí Minh (2)	3

Semi-Finals
16 September 2020
Than Quảng Ninh (1)	1
Viettel (1)	2
16 September 2020
Hà Nội (1)	5
TP Hồ Chí Minh (1)	1

Final
20 September 2020
Viettel (1)	1
Hà Nội (1)	2

== Top scorers ==
As of 20 September 2020

Rank	Player	Club	Goals
1	(Vietnam) Nguyễn Văn Quyết	Hà Nội	5
2	(Vietnam) Nguyễn Quang Hải	Hà Nội	4
3	(Vietnam) Nguyễn Thành Chung	Hà Nội	3
3	(Brazil) Rafaelson	DNH Nam Định	3
4	(Vietnam) Đỗ Văn Thuận	Hồ Chí Minh City	2
4	(Vietnam) Chu Văn Kiên	Bà Rịa–Vũng Tàu	2
4	(Vietnam) Hoàng Ngọc Hùng	Bình Phước	2
4	(Brazil) Bruno Cantanhede	Viettel	2
4	(Jamaica) Jermie Lynch	Than Quảng Ninh	2
4	(United States) Victor Mansaray	Hồng Lĩnh Hà Tĩnh	2
