= Trần Ngọc Sơn =

Trần Ngọc Sơn may refer to:

- Trần Ngọc Sơn (born 1996), Vietnamese footballer
- Trần Ngọc Sơn (born 2003), Vietnamese footballer
