= Yousef Hassan =

Qatari footballer (born 1996)

Personal information
- Full name: Yousef Hassan Mohamed Ali
- Date of birth: 24 May 1996 (age 30)
- Place of birth: Doha, Qatar
- Height: 1.86 m (6 ft 1 in)
- Position: Goalkeeper

Team information
- Current team: Al-Arabi
- Number: 13

Youth career
- 2009–2015: Aspire Academy
- 2012–2014: → Villarreal (loan)

Senior career*
Years	Team	Apps	(Gls)
2015–2025	Al-Gharafa	108	(0)
2015–2016	→ Eupen (loan)	0	(0)
2025–	Al-Arabi	7	(0)

International career^{‡}
2014-2016	Qatar U20	13	(0)
2016-2018	Qatar U23	1	(0)
2018–	Qatar	7	(0)
Medal record
Representing Qatar
Men's football
AFC Asian Cup
Winner	2019
FIFA Arab Cup
Third place	2021
- * Club domestic league appearances and goals as of 17 January 2026 ‡ National team caps and goals as of 2 December 2021 (UTC)

Yousef Hassan Mohamed Ali (Arabic: يُوسُف حَسَن مُحَمَّد عَلِيّ; born 24 May 1996) is a Qatari footballer who plays for Al-Arabi and the Qatar national football team.

== Early life ==
Yousef is of Egyptian descent.

== Career ==
Hassan was loaned to Belgian club Eupen from Al-Gharafa during the winter transfer window in January 2015.

== Honours ==
=== Club ===
Al-Gharafa

- Qatari Stars Cup: 2017–2018, 2018–2019

=== International ===
Qatar

- 2019 AFC Asian Cup
- 2014 AFC U-19 Championship
