= Settawut Wongsai =

Thai footballer

Personal information
- Full name: Settawut Wongsai
- Date of birth: 7 May 1997 (age 29)
- Place of birth: Sakon Nakhon, Thailand
- Height: 1.77 m (5 ft 9 1/2 in)
- Positions: Forward; winger

Team information
- Current team: Khon Kaen United

Youth career
- 2014–2016: Chonburi

Senior career*
Years	Team	Apps	(Gls)
2017–2023	Chonburi	38	(3)
2020	→ MOF Customs United (loan)	1	(0)
2020	→ Ayutthaya United (loan)	11	(2)
2021–2022	→ Samut Prakan City (loan)	23	(1)
2022	→ Police Tero (loan)	6	(0)
2023	→ Pattaya Dolphins United (loan)	16	(2)
2023–2025	Phrae United	71	(20)
2025–2026	Hougang United	16	(5)
2026–	Khon Kaen United	0	(0)

International career^{‡}
2017–2018	Thailand U21	7	(1)
2018–2019	Thailand U23	2	(0)
- * Club domestic league appearances and goals as of 04:20, 27 May 2026 (UTC) ‡ National team caps and goals as of 9 June 2022

Settawut Wongsai (Thai: เสฏฐวุฒิ วงค์สาย, born 7 May 1997) is a Thai professional footballer who plays as a forward, he has also been used as a winger for Thai League 2 club Khon Kaen United.

== International goals ==
=== U21 ===
Settawut Wongsai – goals for Thailand U21
#	Date	Venue	Opponent	Score	Result	Competition
1.	12 December 2017	Cần Thơ Stadium, Cần Thơ, Vietnam	Vietnam	0–1	0–1	2017 Thanh Niên Cup

== Honours ==
=== Club ===
Pattaya Dolphins United

- Thai League 3 Eastern Region: 2022–23
