= Hoàng Thanh Tùng =

Vietnamese footballer (born 1996)

Personal information
- Full name: Hoàng Thanh Tùng
- Date of birth: 19 November 1996 (age 29)
- Place of birth: Triệu Sơn, Thanh Hóa, Vietnam
- Height: 1.67 m (5 ft 6 in)
- Position: Winger

Team information
- Current team: Đồng Tháp
- Number: 18

Youth career
- 2007–2014: Hoàng Anh Gia Lai – Arsenal JMG

Senior career*
Years	Team	Apps	(Gls)
2015–2022	Hoàng Anh Gia Lai	56	(5)
2020	→ Bà Rịa-Vũng Tàu (loan)	3	(0)
2021	→ Công An Nhân Dân (loan)	2	(0)
2022	Cần Thơ	14	(0)
2023–2024	Phù Đổng	34	(5)
2024–	Đồng Tháp	16	(0)

International career
2013–2014	Vietnam U19	13	(6)
2016–2017	Vietnam U22	1	(1)
- * Club domestic league appearances and goals as of 6 June 2026

Hoàng Thanh Tùng (born 19 November 1996) is a Vietnamese professional footballer who plays as a winger for V.League 2 club Phù Đổng.

== International career ==
=== U-19 ===
#	Date	Venue	Opponent	Score	Result	Competition
1	7 October 2013	KLFA Stadium, Malaysia	Australia	3–1	5-1	2014 AFC U-19 Championship qualification
2	11 October 2014	Wunna Theikdi Stadium, Myanmar	Japan	1–1	1-3	2014 AFC U-19 Championship
3	13 October 2014	Thuwunna Stadium, Myanmar	China	1–1	1–1	2014 AFC U-19 Championship

=== U-22 ===
#	Date	Venue	Opponent	Score	Result	Competition
1	8 November 2016	Wuhan, China	China	1–1	1–1	CFA U-22 International Football Tournament 2016

== Honours ==
Vietnam U19

- AFF U-19 Youth Championship runners-up: 2013, 2014
- Hassanal Bolkiah Trophy runners-up: 2014

Vietnam U21

- International U-21 Thanh Niên Newspaper Cup runners-up: 2017
