= Diogo Amado =

Portuguese footballer

Personal information
- Full name: Diogo Carlos Correia Amado
- Date of birth: 21 January 1990 (age 36)
- Place of birth: Lagos, Portugal
- Height: 1.77 m (5 ft 10 in)
- Position: Midfielder

Team information
- Current team: União Leiria
- Number: 25

Youth career
- 1998–1999: Centro de Lagos
- 1999–2001: Esperança Lagos
- 2001–2009: Sporting CP

Senior career*
Years	Team	Apps	(Gls)
2009–2010	Sporting CP	0	(0)
2009	→ Real Massamá (loan)	6	(0)
2010	→ Odivelas (loan)	12	(0)
2010–2012	União Leiria	15	(1)
2011–2012	→ Estoril (loan)	20	(1)
2012	Sheffield Wednesday	0	(0)
2012–2017	Estoril	124	(5)
2017–2019	Al-Gharafa	40	(3)
2020–2021	Ajman	8	(0)
2022–	União Leiria	80	(0)

International career
2006	Portugal U16	5	(1)
2006–2007	Portugal U17	11	(1)
2007–2008	Portugal U18	6	(2)
2008–2009	Portugal U19	6	(0)
2010	Portugal U20	4	(0)
2011–2012	Portugal U21	8	(0)
- * Club domestic league appearances and goals as of 21:34, 2 June 2026 (UTC)

Diogo Carlos Correia Amado (born 21 January 1990) is a Portuguese professional footballer who plays as a midfielder for Liga Portugal 2 club União de Leiria.

== Club career ==
=== Sporting CP ===
Born in Lagos, Algarve, Amado joined Sporting CP's youth system at the age of 11. He made his senior debut in 2009–10, splitting the season between two third division clubs (both on loan), including farm team Real Sport Clube. In June, he was released.

=== União Leiria ===
For 2010–11, Amado joined U.D. Leiria of the Primeira Liga, making his debut in the competition on 15 August in a 0–0 away draw against S.C. Beira-Mar and appearing in exactly half of the league matches as the team finished in tenth position. Ahead of the following campaign, he was loaned to G.D. Estoril Praia in the Segunda Liga.

Amado and Estoril returned to the top flight as champions. His only goal came on 13 May 2012 in the 2–2 home draw with F.C. Arouca, who in turn avoided relegation with that result.

=== Sheffield Wednesday and Estoril ===
Amado signed a two-year contract with Sheffield Wednesday on 10 July 2012, having been recommended to manager Dave Jones by José Semedo, an ex-teammate of Amado from his Sporting youth days. However, he failed to settle and left the following month, rejoining his previous club Estoril.

On 7 October 2012, Amado scored his first goal in the top tier for the side, but in a 1–3 home loss to Rio Ave FC. On 3 April 2016, he repeated the feat but was also sent off for two bookable offences in the 1–0 win over F.C. Paços de Ferreira; in between, he participated twice with them in the UEFA Europa League, scoring against Panathinaikos FC (2–0) and PSV Eindhoven (3–3) in the group stage of the 2014–15 edition.

=== Al-Gharafa ===
In July 2017, Amado moved to Al-Gharafa SC from the Qatar Stars League. During his tenure, he won back-to-back Stars Cup trophies.

=== Later career ===
Amado returned to União de Leiria on 20 January 2022 following a brief spell in the United Arab Emirates with Ajman Club, with the former club now in the newly created Liga 3. He helped it to achieve promotion to division two in 2023.

== Honours ==
Estoril

- Segunda Liga: 2011–12

Al-Gharafa

- Qatari Stars Cup: 2017–18, 2018–19
