= 2018–19 Qatari Stars Cup =

Tournament details
- Country: Qatar
- Dates: 11 October 2018 – 31 January 2019
- Teams: 12

Final positions
- Champions: Al-Gharafa SC (3rd title)
- Runners-up: Al-Duhail SC

Tournament statistics
- Matches played: 37
- Goals scored: 117 (3.16 per match)

The 2018 Qatari Stars Cup was the eighth edition of Qatari Stars Cup.

The tournament featured 12 teams divided into 2 groups.

== Round One Groups ==
Group A	Group B
Al-Gharafa SC; Al-Arabi SC; Qatar SC; Al Kharaitiyat SC; Umm Salal SC; Al-Duhail	Al Sadd SC; Al-Sailiya SC; Al-Rayyan SC; Al Shahaniya SC; Al-Khor SC; Al Ahli SC

=== Standings ===
==== Group A ====
Pos	Team	Pld	W	D	L	GF	GA	GD	Pts
1	Qatar SC	5	3	2	0	9	3	+6	11
2	Al-Gharafa SC	5	2	3	0	9	4	+5	9
3	Al-Duhail SC	5	2	2	1	9	5	+4	8
4	Al Kharaitiyat SC	5	2	0	3	5	9	−4	6
5	Umm Salal SC	5	1	2	2	3	6	−3	5
6	Al-Arabi SC	5	0	1	4	2	10	−8	1

Source: soccerway.com
Rules for classification: 1) points; 2) goal difference; 3) number of goals scored.

===== Results =====
Date	Team 1	Score	Team 2
2018/09/08	Umm Salal	1–0	Al-Arabi SC
2018/09/08	Al-Duhail SC	2–1	Al Kharaitiyat SC
2018/09/08	Al-Gharafa SC	1–1	Qatar SC
2018/10/11	Qatar SC	0–0	Umm Salal
2018/10/11	Al Kharaitiyat SC	2–0	Al-Arabi SC
2018/10/11	Al-Duhail SC	1–1	Al-Gharafa SC
2018/10/17	Umm Salal SC	1–1	Al-Duhail SC
2018/10/17	Al-Gharafa SC	3–0	Al Kharaitiyat SC
2018/10/17	Al-Arabi SC	1–2	Qatar SC
2018/12/21	Al-Duhail SC	4–0	Al-Arabi SC
2018/12/21	Al Kharaitiyat SC	0–4	Qatar SC
2018/12/21	Al-Gharafa SC	3–1	Umm Salal SC
2019/01/10	Umm Salal SC	0–2	Al Kharaitiyat SC
2019/01/10	Al-Arabi SC	1–1	Al-Gharafa SC
2019/01/11	Qatar SC	2–1	Al-Duhail SC

==== Group B ====
Pos	Team	Pld	W	D	L	GF	GA	GD	Pts
1	Al-Rayyan	5	4	1	0	20	3	+17	13
2	Al-Khor SC	5	3	2	0	11	7	+4	11
3	Al Ahli SC	5	3	0	2	8	6	+2	9
4	Al Sadd SC	5	1	2	2	8	16	−8	5
5	Al Shahaniya SC	5	1	0	4	3	10	−7	3
6	Al-Sailiya SC	5	0	1	4	4	12	−8	1

Source: soccerway.com
Rules for classification: 1) points; 2) goal difference; 3) number of goals scored.

===== Results =====
Date	Team 1	Score	Team 2
2018/09/09	Al-Rayyan SC	3–0	Al Ahli SC
2018/09/09	Al Sadd SC	3–0	Al Shahaniya SC
2018/09/09	Al-Sailiya SC	1–2	Al-Khor SC
2018/10/13	Al Sadd SC	0–8	Al-Rayyan SC
2018/10/13	Al Ahli SC	2–2	Al-Sailiya SC
2018/10/13	Al Shahaniya SC	1–2	Al-Khor SC
2018/11/16	Al-Sailiya SC	3–3	Al Sadd SC
2018/11/16	Al Khor SC	3–1	Al Ahli SC
2017/11/16	Al-Rayyan SC	3–1	Al Shahaniya SC
2018/12/20	Al Shahaniya SC	0–2	Al Ahli SC
2018/12/20	Al Sadd SC	2–2	Al-Khor SC
2018/12/20	Al-Rayyan SC	4–0	Al-Sailiya SC
2019/01/11	Al-Khor SC	2–2	Al-Rayyan SC
2019/01/11	Al-Sailiya SC	0–1	Al Shahaniya SC
2019/01/11	Al Ahli SC	3–0	Al Sadd SC

== Knockout round ==
=== Quarter-finals ===
18 January 2019
13:25 AST (UTC+3)

Al-Rayyan SC	2–3	Al Kharaitiyat SC
Sebastián Soria 65', 82'	Report	Abdelhadi Feheed 6', 16'; Muhammed Raza 90'

Thani bin Jassim Stadium, Al-Gharafa SC

18 January 2019
15:50 AST (UTC+3)

Al-Gharafa SC	1–0	Al Ahli SC
Diogo Amado 62'	Report

Thani bin Jassim Stadium, Al-Gharafa SC

19 January 2019
13:25 AST (UTC+3)

Qatar SC	2–0	Al Sadd SC
Ali Al-Muhannadi 6', 59'	Report

Thani bin Jassim Stadium, Al-Gharafa SC

19 January 2019
15:50 AST (UTC+3)

Al-Duhail SC	5–1	Al-Khor SC
Fahad Waad 6'; Nasser Al Yazidi 56', 60', 90+3'; Youssef El-Arabi 73'	Report	Said Brahmi 32'

Thani bin Jassim Stadium, Al-Gharafa SC

=== Semi-finals ===
26 January 2019
13:30 AST (UTC+3)

Al Kharaitiyat SC	0–3	Al-Gharafa SC
	Report

Abdullah bin Khalifa Stadium, Al-Duhail SC

26 January 2019
16:30 AST (UTC+3)

Qatar SC	0–4	Al-Duhail SC
	Report	Edmilson Junior 11', 65'; Youssef El-Arabi 23'; Sultan Al-Braik 29'

Abdullah bin Khalifa Stadium, Al-Duhail SC

== Final ==
31 January 2019
16:00 AST (UTC+3)

Al-Gharafa	1–0	Al-Duhail SC
Vladimír Weiss 13'	Report

Abdullah bin Khalifa Stadium, Al-Duhail SC
