= Lê Văn Sơn =

Vietnamese footballer (born 1996)

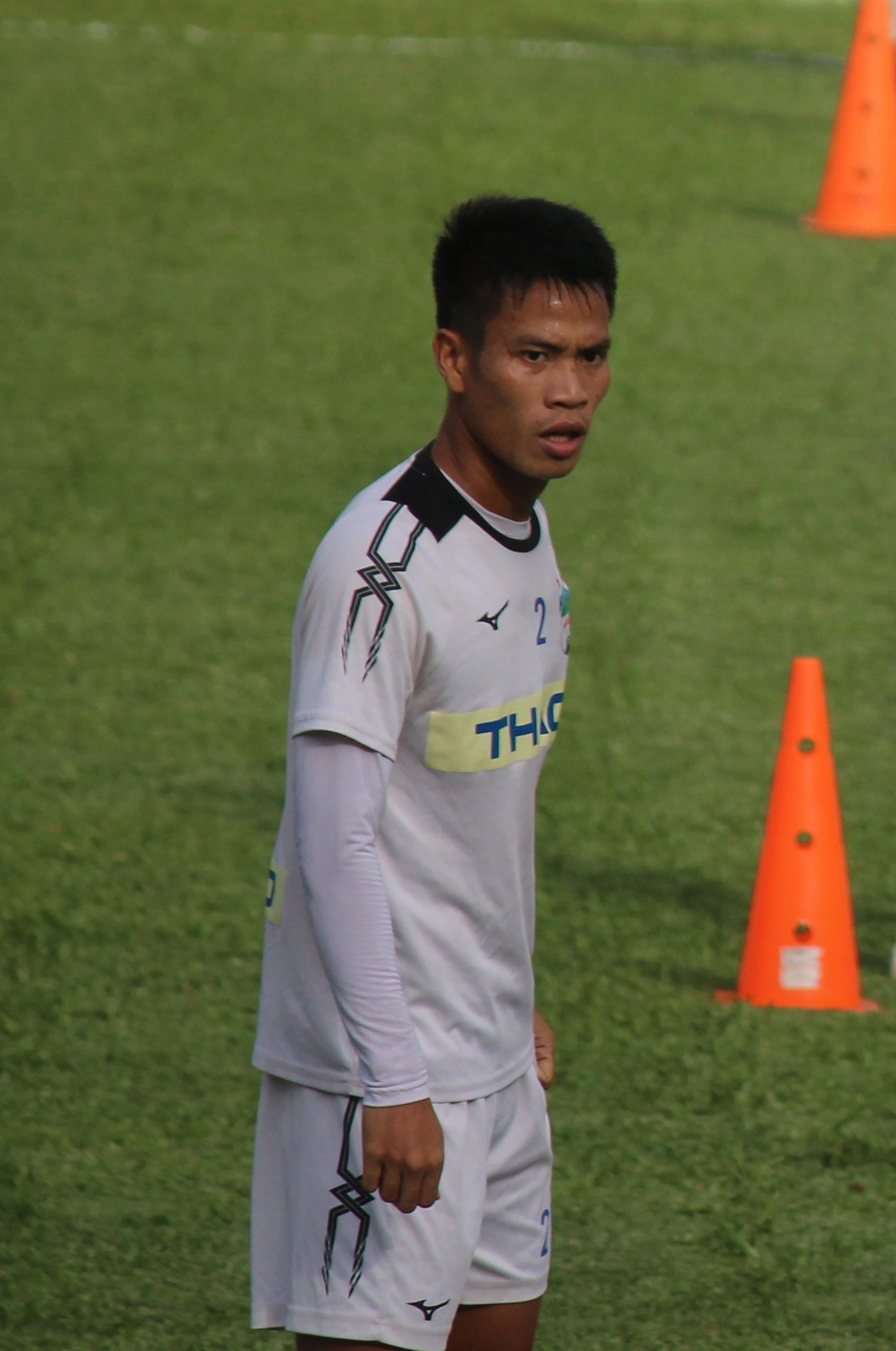
- Văn Sơn in 2019

Personal information
- Full name: Lê Văn Sơn
- Date of birth: 20 December 1996 (age 29)
- Place of birth: Kim Thành, Hải Dương, Vietnam
- Height: 1.68 m (5 ft 6 in)
- Position: Right-back

Team information
- Current team: Đồng Nai City
- Number: 16

Youth career
- 2007–2014: Hoàng Anh Gia Lai

Senior career*
Years	Team	Apps	(Gls)
2015–2025	Hoàng Anh Gia Lai	158	(4)
2020	→ Hồ Chí Minh City (loan)	6	(0)
2021	→ Becamex Bình Dương (loan)	1	(0)
2025–	Đồng Nai City	15	(0)

International career^{‡}
2013–2014	Vietnam U19	16	(3)
2015–2017	Vietnam U23	6	(0)
- * Club domestic league appearances and goals as of 6 June 2026 ‡ National team caps and goals as of 14 May 2017

Lê Văn Sơn (born 20 December 1996) is a Vietnamese professional footballer who plays as a right-back for V.League 1 club Đồng Nai City.

== Club career ==
After 10 years at Hoàng Anh Gia Lai, Văn Sơn announced his departure in June 2025. He was the last player of the club's Golden Generation that remained at the club alongside Trần Minh Vương and Châu Ngọc Quang, consisting of players born in 1995 and 1996.

In July 2025, Văn Sơn joined V.League 2 side Trường Tươi Đồng Nai.

== International goals ==
=== U-19 ===
#	Date	Venue	Opponent	Score	Result	Competition
1.	5 October 2013	Kuala Lumpur, KLFA Stadium	Hong Kong	5–1	5–1	2014 AFC U-19 Championship qualification
2.	7 October 2013	Kuala Lumpur, KLFA Stadium	Australia	5–1	5–1	2014 AFC U-19 Championship qualification
3.	20 August 2014	Bandar Seri Begawan, Hassanal Bolkiah National Stadium	Thailand	1–0	1–0	2014 Hassanal Bolkiah Trophy

== Honours ==
Trường Tươi Đồng Nai

- V.League 2: 2025–26

Vietnam U21

- International U-21 Thanh Niên Newspaper Cup runner-up: 2017

Vietnam U19

- AFF U-19 Youth Championship runner-up: 2013, 2014,
- Hassanal Bolkiah Trophy runner-up: 2014

Individual

- Vietnamese National U-21 Championship top scorer: 2017
- Vietnamese National U-21 Championship best player: 2017
