= 2014 AFC U-19 Championship =

၂၀၁၄ အေအက်ဖ်စီ ယူ-၁၉ ချန်ပီယံရှစ်

Tournament details
- Host country: Myanmar
- Dates: 9–23 October
- Teams: 16 (from 1 confederation)
- Venues: 2 (in 2 host cities)

Final positions
- Champions: Qatar (1st title)
- Runners-up: North Korea

Tournament statistics
- Matches played: 31
- Goals scored: 92 (2.97 per match)
- Attendance: 233,739 (7,540 per match)
- Top scorer(s): (Qatar) Ahmed Al Saadi (Uzbekistan) Zabikhillo Urinboev (North Korea) Jo Kwang-myong (5 goals each)
- Best player: (Qatar) Ahmed Moein
- Fair play award: North Korea

The 2014 AFC U-19 Championship was the 38th edition of the biennial international youth football tournament organized by the Asian Football Confederation (AFC) for players aged 19 and below. Myanmar were approved as hosts of the competition on 25 April 2013. The tournament was held from 9 to 23 October 2014, with the top four teams qualifying for the 2015 FIFA U-20 World Cup in New Zealand.

Qatar won the tournament, and were joined by North Korea, hosts Myanmar, and Uzbekistan as AFC qualifiers for the 2015 FIFA U-20 World Cup.

== Venues ==
Yangon	Naypyidaw
Thuwunna Stadium	Wunna Theikdi Stadium
Capacity: 32,000	Capacity: 30,000
Location of stadiums of the 2014 AFC U-19 Championship

== Qualification ==
The draw for the qualifiers was held on 26 April 2013 in Kuala Lumpur, Malaysia.

=== Qualified teams ===
- Australia
- China
- Indonesia
- Iran
- Iraq
- Japan
- Myanmar (hosts)
- Oman
- North Korea
- Qatar
- South Korea
- Thailand
- United Arab Emirates
- Uzbekistan
- Vietnam
- Yemen

== Draw ==
The draw for the competition was held on 24 April 2014 in Yangon, Myanmar.

Pot 1 (Host & Seeds)	Pot 2	Pot 3	Pot 4
Myanmar; South Korea; Iraq; Uzbekistan	Australia; Japan; Iran; North Korea	United Arab Emirates; Thailand; China; Qatar	Indonesia; Oman; Vietnam; Yemen

== Squads ==
Only players born on or after 1 January 1995 are eligible to compete in the 2014 AFC U-19 Championship. Each team can register a maximum of 23 players (minimum three of whom must be goalkeepers).

== Group stage ==
The top two teams from each group advanced to the quarter-finals.

If two or more teams are equal on points on completion of the group matches, the following criteria were applied to determine the rankings.

1. Greater number of points obtained in the group matches between the teams concerned;
2. Goal difference resulting from the group matches between the teams concerned;
3. Greater number of goals scored in the group matches between the teams concerned;
4. Goal difference in all the group matches;
5. Greater number of goals scored in all the group matches;
6. Kicks from the penalty mark if only two teams are involved and they are both on the field of play;
7. Fewer score calculated according to the number of yellow and red cards received in the group matches;
8. Drawing of lots.

All times are local (UTC+6:30).

=== Group A ===
Team	Pld	W	D	L	GF	GA	GD	Pts
Thailand	3	2	0	1	5	6	−1	6
Myanmar	3	1	1	1	3	2	+1	4
Yemen	3	1	1	1	3	3	0	4
Iran	3	1	0	2	3	3	0	3

9 October 2014
15:30

Iran	1–2	Thailand
Mazloum 15'	Report	Thanasit 65'; Chenrop 82'

Thuwunna Stadium, Yangon
Attendance: 2,850
Referee: Abdulrahman Abdou (Qatar)
9 October 2014
18:30

Myanmar	0–0	Yemen
	Report

Thuwunna Stadium, Yangon
Attendance: 13,142
Referee: Ryuji Sato (Japan)

11 October 2014
15:30

Yemen	1–0	Iran
Al-Sarori 6'	Report

Thuwunna Stadium, Yangon
Attendance: 24,568
Referee: Mohd Amirul Izwan Bin Yaacob (Malaysia)
11 October 2014
18:30

Thailand	0–3	Myanmar
	Report	Nyein Chan Aung 13', 18'; Aung Thu 42'

Thuwunna Stadium, Yangon
Attendance: 24,568
Referee: Nawaf Shukralla (Bahrain)

13 October 2014
18:30

Myanmar	0–2	Iran
	Report	Seyyedi 56'; Moharrami 83'

Thuwunna Stadium, Yangon
Attendance: 19,784
Referee: Abdullah Al Hilali (Oman)
13 October 2014
18:30

Thailand	3–2	Yemen
Patiphan 40', 85', 88'	Report	K. Mahdi 1'; Mohammed 64'

Wunna Theikdi Stadium, Nay Pyi Taw
Attendance: 600
Referee: Strebre Delovski (Australia)

=== Group B ===
Team	Pld	W	D	L	GF	GA	GD	Pts
United Arab Emirates	3	1	2	0	7	4	+3	5
Uzbekistan	3	1	2	0	6	4	+2	5
Australia	3	1	2	0	3	2	+1	5
Indonesia	3	0	0	3	2	8	−6	0

10 October 2014
15:30

Uzbekistan	3–1	Indonesia
Khamdanov 18'; Urinboev 22' (pen.); Shukurov 87'	Report	Sitanggang 58'

Thuwunna Stadium, Yangon
Attendance: 625
Referee: Abdullah Al Hilali (Oman)
10 October 2014
18:30

Australia	1–1	United Arab Emirates
Borrello 79'	Report	Mubarak 85' (pen.)

Thuwunna Stadium, Yangon
Attendance: 625
Referee: Yudai Yamamoto (Japan)

12 October 2014
15:30

Indonesia	0–1	Australia
	Report	Sotirio 67'

Thuwunna Stadium, Yangon
Attendance: 628
Referee: Abdulrahman Abdou (Qatar)
12 October 2014
18:30

United Arab Emirates	2–2	Uzbekistan
Ghanem 25'; Al Attas 90+3'	Report	Shomurodov 44'; Urinboev 53'

Thuwunna Stadium, Yangon
Attendance: 628
Referee: Ryuji Sato (Japan)

14 October 2014
18:30

Uzbekistan	1–1	Australia
Urinboev 82'	Report	Mauk 66'

Thuwunna Stadium, Yangon
Attendance: 536
Referee: Nawaf Shukralla (Bahrain)
14 October 2014
18:30

United Arab Emirates	4–1	Indonesia
Al-Akbari 11'; Al Attas 22'; Jassem 50'; Rabee 79'	Report	Drajad 52'

Wunna Theikdi Stadium, Nay Pyi Taw
Attendance: 400
Referee: Fahad Al-Mirdasi (Saudi Arabia)

=== Group C ===
Team	Pld	W	D	L	GF	GA	GD	Pts
Japan	3	2	0	1	6	4	+2	6
China	3	1	2	0	3	2	+1	5
South Korea	3	1	1	1	7	2	+5	4
Vietnam	3	0	1	2	2	10	−8	1

9 October 2014
15:30

South Korea	6–0	Vietnam
Lee Jung-bin 45'; Kim Gun-hee 54', 90+1'; Shim Je-hyeok 60'; Hwang Hee-chan 66' (pen.); Paik Seung-ho 76'	Report

Wunna Theikdi Stadium, Nay Pyi Taw
Attendance: 300
Referee: Abdulla Hassan Mohamed (United Arab Emirates)
9 October 2014
18:30

Japan	1–2	China
Minamino 16'	Report	Wei Shihao 1' (pen.), 77'

Wunna Theikdi Stadium, Nay Pyi Taw
Attendance: 250
Referee: Strebre Delovski (Australia)

11 October 2014
15:30

Vietnam	1–3	Japan
Hoàng Thanh Tùng 90'	Report	Okugawa 59'; Nakatani 90+5'; Ideguchi 90+6'

Wunna Theikdi Stadium, Nay Pyi Taw
Attendance: 300
Referee: Hettikamkanamge Perera (Sri Lanka)
11 October 2014
18:30

China	0–0	South Korea
	Report

Wunna Theikdi Stadium, Nay Pyi Taw
Attendance: 300
Referee: Fahad Al-Mirdasi (Saudi Arabia)

13 October 2014
15:30

South Korea	1–2	Japan
Kim Gun-hee 29'	Report	Minamino 13', 65'

Wunna Theikdi Stadium, Nay Pyi Taw
Attendance: 600
Referee: Ravshan Irmatov (Uzbekistan)
13 October 2014
15:30

China	1–1	Vietnam
Tang Shi 88'	Report	Hoàng Thanh Tùng 20'

Thuwunna Stadium, Yangon
Attendance: 19,784
Referee: Mohd Amirul Izwan Bin Yaacob (Malaysia)

=== Group D ===
Team	Pld	W	D	L	GF	GA	GD	Pts
Qatar	3	2	1	0	6	2	+4	7
North Korea	3	1	1	1	4	5	−1	4
Iraq	3	1	1	1	8	3	+5	4
Oman	3	0	1	2	1	9	−8	1

10 October 2014
15:30

Iraq	6–0	Oman
Mohsin 7', 43'; Al Shiyadi 27' (o.g.); Kareem 74'; Tahseen 85'; Aymen 89'	Report

Wunna Theikdi Stadium, Nay Pyi Taw
Attendance: 300
Referee: Ravshan Irmatov (Uzbekistan)
10 October 2014
18:30

North Korea	1–3	Qatar
Jo Kwang-myong 5'	Report	Al Saadi 74' (pen.); Almoez Ali 79'; Afif 86' (pen.)

Wunna Theikdi Stadium, Nay Pyi Taw
Attendance: 300
Referee: Chris Beath (Australia)

12 October 2014
15:30

Oman	1–1	North Korea
Mubarak 72'	Report	So Jong-hyok 90'

Wunna Theikdi Stadium, Nay Pyi Taw
Attendance: 400
Referee: Abdulla Hassan Mohamed (United Arab Emirates)
12 October 2014
18:30

Qatar	1–1	Iraq
Al Saadi 51'	Report	Rasan 39' (pen.)

Wunna Theikdi Stadium, Nay Pyi Taw
Attendance: 400
Referee: Muhammad Taqi Aljaafari Bin Jahari (Singapore)

14 October 2014
15:30

Iraq	1–2	North Korea
Mhawi 90+3'	Report	Jo Kwang-myong 50'; Kim Yu-song 63'

Wunna Theikdi Stadium, Nay Pyi Taw
Attendance: 400
Referee: Hettikamkanamge Perera (Sri Lanka)
14 October 2014
15:30

Qatar	2–0	Oman
Al Saadi 58' (pen.), 65'	Report

Thuwunna Stadium, Yangon
Attendance: 536
Referee: Yudai Yamamoto (Japan)

== Knockout stage ==
In the knockout stage, extra time and penalty shoot-out are used to decide the winner if necessary.

Quarter-finals
17 October 2014
Thailand	1
Uzbekistan	2
17 October 2014
Japan	1 (4)
North Korea (p)	1 (5)
17 October 2014
United Arab Emirates	0
Myanmar	1
17 October 2014
Qatar	4
China	2

Semi-finals
20 October 2014
Uzbekistan	0
North Korea	5
20 October 2014
Myanmar	2
Qatar (a.e.t.)	3

Final
23 October 2014
North Korea	0
Qatar	1

=== Quarter-finals ===
Winners qualified for 2015 FIFA U-20 World Cup.

17 October 2014
19:00

Thailand	1–2	Uzbekistan
Chenrop 48'	Report	Urinboev 6', 20'

Thuwunna Stadium, Yangon
Attendance: 29,000
Referee: Abdulrahman Abdou (Qatar)

17 October 2014
15:30

United Arab Emirates	0–1	Myanmar
	Report	Than Paing 53'

Thuwunna Stadium, Yangon
Attendance: 29,000
Referee: Ryuji Sato (Japan)

17 October 2014
15:30

Japan	1–1 (a.e.t.)	North Korea
Minamino 83' (pen.)	Report	Kim Kuk-chol 36'
Penalties
Mochizuki (penalty scored); Sakai (penalty scored); Ideguchi (penalty scored); Nakatani (penalty scored); Minamino (penalty missed)	4–5	(penalty scored) Kang Nam-gwon; (penalty scored) Ri Un-chol; (penalty scored) Min Hyo-song; (penalty scored) Jon Kum-dong; (penalty scored) Jo Sol-song

Wunna Theikdi Stadium, Nay Pyi Taw
Attendance: 400
Referee: Fahad Al-Mirdasi (Saudi Arabia)

17 October 2014
19:00

Qatar	4–2	China
Al Saadi 6'; Afif 45+5' (pen.); Moein 58'; Ali 90+6'	Report	Gui Hong 54'; Wei Jingzong 86' (pen.)

Wunna Theikdi Stadium, Nay Pyi Taw
Attendance: 400
Referee: Ravshan Irmatov (Uzbekistan)

=== Semi-finals ===
20 October 2014
15:30

Uzbekistan	0–5	North Korea
	Report	Jo Kwang-myong 5', 39', 63'; Kim Yu-song 70'; So Jong-hyok 73'

Thuwunna Stadium, Yangon
Attendance: 29,870
Referee: Abdulla Hassan Mohamed (United Arab Emirates)

20 October 2014
19:00

Myanmar	2–3 (a.e.t.)	Qatar
Aung Thu 62'; Nyein Chan Aung 64'	Report	Ali 45+1'; Afif 75'; Thiam 90+2'

Thuwunna Stadium, Yangon
Attendance: 29,870
Referee: Mohd Amirul Izwan Bin Yaacob (Malaysia)

=== Final ===
23 October 2014
19:00

North Korea	0–1	Qatar
	Report	Afif 52'

Thuwunna Stadium, Yangon
Attendance: 2,375
Referee: Abdullah Al Hilali (Oman)

== Winners ==
2014 AFC U-19 Championship winners

Qatar
First title

== Qualified teams for the 2015 FIFA U-20 World Cup ==
The top four teams qualified for the 2015 FIFA U-20 World Cup:

- Qatar (winners)
- North Korea (runners-up)
- Myanmar (semi-finalists) (debut)
- Uzbekistan (semi-finalists)

== Awards ==
Award	Winner
Top scorer	(Qatar) Ahmed Al Saadi
MVP	(Qatar) Ahmed Moein
Fair play team	North Korea

== Goalscorers ==
5 goals

- (North Korea) Jo Kwang-myong
- (Qatar) Ahmed Al Saadi
- (Uzbekistan) Zabikhillo Urinboev

4 goals

- (Japan) Takumi Minamino
- (Qatar) Akram Afif

3 goals

- (South Korea) Kim Gun-hee
- (Myanmar) Nyein Chan Aung
- (Qatar) Almoez Ali
- (Thailand) Patiphan Pinsermsootsri

2 goals

- (China) Wei Shihao
- (Iraq) Emad Mohsin
- (North Korea) Kim Yu-song
- (North Korea) So Jong-hyok
- (Myanmar) Aung Thu
- (Thailand) Chenrop Samphaodi
- (United Arab Emirates) Ahmed Al Attas
- (Vietnam) Hoàng Thanh Tùng

1 goal

- (Australia) Brandon Borrello
- (Australia) Jaushua Sotirio
- (Australia) Stefan Mauk
- (China) Gui Hong
- (China) Tang Shi
- (China) Wei Jingzong
- (Indonesia) Dimas Drajad
- (Indonesia) Paulo Sitanggang
- (Iran) Amin Mazloum
- (Iran) Yousef Seyyedi
- (Iran) Sadegh Moharrami
- (Iraq) Ayman Hussein
- (Iraq) Alaa Ali Mhawi
- (Iraq) Layth Tahseen
- (Iraq) Sherko Karim
- (Iraq) Bashar Rasan
- (Japan) Yosuke Ideguchi
- (Japan) Shinnosuke Nakatani
- (Japan) Masaya Okugawa
- (North Korea) Kim Kuk-chol
- (South Korea) Paik Seung-ho
- (South Korea) Hwang Hee-chan
- (South Korea) Lee Jung-bin
- (South Korea) Shim Je-hyeok
- (Myanmar) Than Paing
- (Oman) Marwan Mubarak
- (Qatar) Ahmed Moein
- (Qatar) Serigne Abdou Thiam
- (Thailand) Thanasit Siriphala
- (United Arab Emirates) Mohamed Al-Akbari
- (United Arab Emirates) Abdullah Ghanem
- (United Arab Emirates) Saeed Jassem
- (United Arab Emirates) Khalfan Mubarak
- (United Arab Emirates) Ahmed Rabee
- (Uzbekistan) Dostonbek Khamdamov
- (Uzbekistan) Otabek Shukurov
- (Uzbekistan) Eldor Shomurodov
- (Yemen) Ahmed Al-Sarori
- (Yemen) Khaled Hussein
- (Yemen) Gehad Mohammed

Own goal

- (Oman) Alaa Ali Shiyadi (playing against Iraq)
