= Ahmed Moein =

Qatari footballer (born 1995)

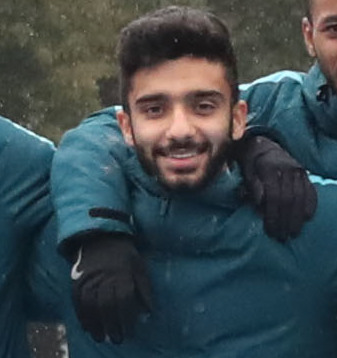
- Moein with Qatar U23 in 2018

Personal information
- Full name: Ahmed Moein Mohammed Doozandeh
- Date of birth: 20 October 1995 (age 31)
- Place of birth: Doha, Qatar
- Height: 1.72 m (5 ft 7 1/2 in)
- Position: Defensive midfielder

Team information
- Current team: Al-Arabi
- Number: 27

Youth career
- Aspire

Senior career*
Years	Team	Apps	(Gls)
2014–2017	El Jaish	24	(0)
2014–2016	→ Eupen (loan)	12	(0)
2017–2023	Al-Duhail	7	(0)
2017–2018	→ Cultural Leonesa (loan)	7	(0)
2018–2020	→ Qatar SC (loan)	33	(1)
2020–2021	→ Al-Wakrah (loan)	18	(0)
2021–2022	→ Qatar SC (loan)	8	(0)
2023–	Al-Arabi	25	(1)

International career^{‡}
2014–2015	Qatar U20	13	(2)
2016–	Qatar U23	12	(0)
2017–	Qatar	6	(0)
- * Club domestic league appearances and goals as of 17 January 2026 ‡ National team caps and goals as of 31 May 2018

Ahmed Moein Mohammed Doozandeh (Arabic: أحمد معين; born 20 October 1995) is a Qatari footballer who plays for Al-Arabi as a defensive midfielder.

In November 2015, Moein was awarded the Asian Young Footballer of the Year award by the AFC. On 29 August 2017, he joined Segunda División club Cultural y Deportiva Leonesa.

== Honours ==
=== Club ===
El Jaish

- Qatar Cup: 2016

=== Country ===
Qatar U20

- AFC U-19 Championship: 2014
