= Abdulrahman Anad =

Qatari footballer (born 1996)

Personal information
- Full name: Abdulrahman Anad Al-Diri
- Date of birth: 6 September 1996 (age 30)
- Place of birth: Qatar
- Height: 1.72 m (5 ft 7 1/2 in)
- Position: Midfielder

Team information
- Current team: Al-Khor
- Number: 4

Youth career
- Al-Rayyan

Senior career*
Years	Team	Apps	(Gls)
2016–2017	Al-Rayyan	16	(1)
2016–2017	→ Al-Shahania (loan)	13	(0)
2017–2025	Al-Arabi	61	(1)
2025–	Al-Khor	0	(0)

International career
- Qatar U20
- * Club domestic league appearances and goals

Abdulrahman Anad (Arabic:عبد الرحمن عناد) (born 6 September 1996) is a Qatari footballer who currently plays for Al-Khor.
