= Jiaxing Stadium =

Sports venue in Jiaxing, China

Coordinates: 30°44′36″N 120°45′23″E

Jiaxing Sports Centre Stadium
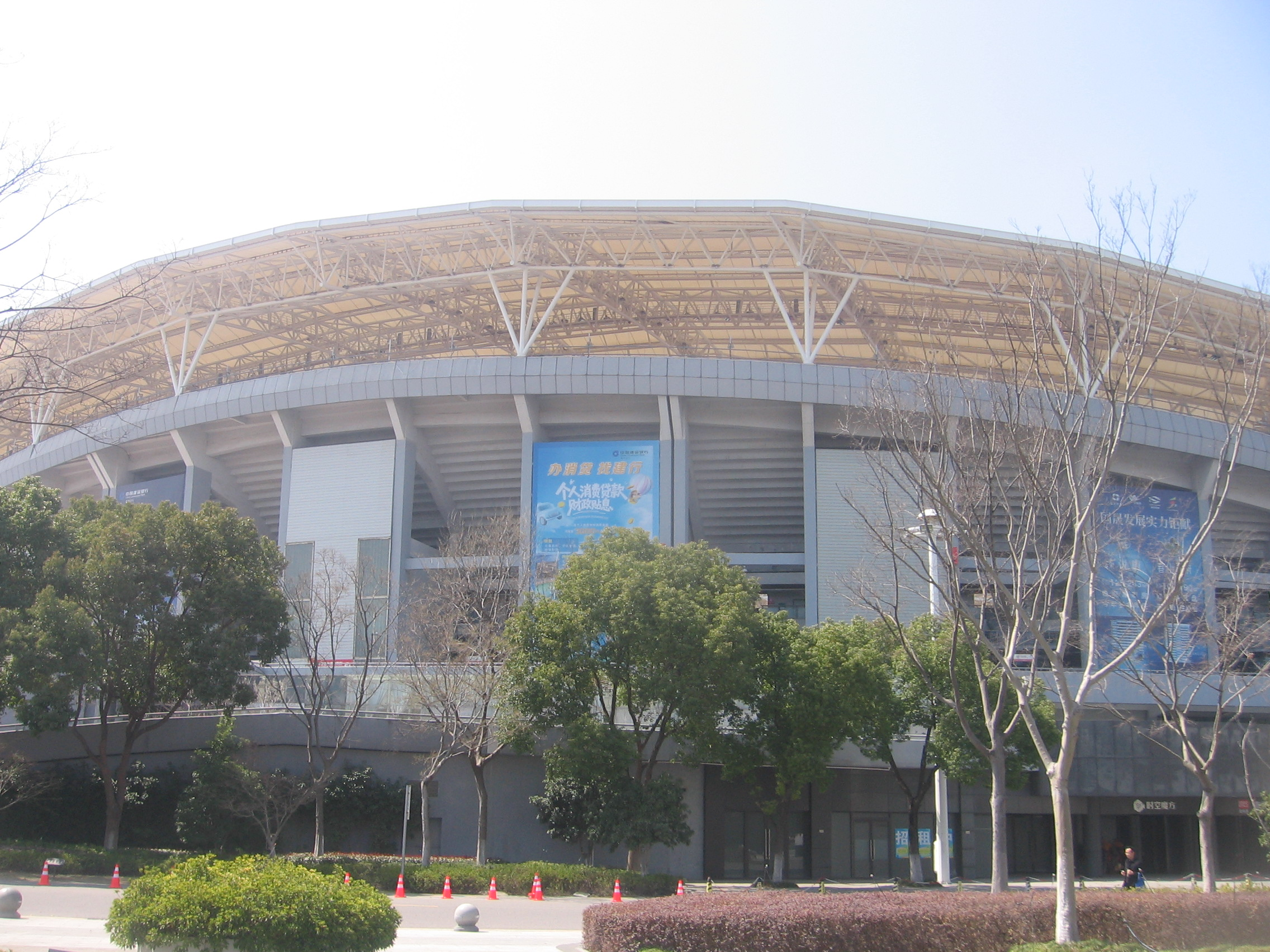
- Interactive map of Jiaxing Sports Centre Stadium
- Full name: Jiaxing Sports Centre Stadium
- Location: Jiaxing, China
- Capacity: 35,000

The Jiaxing Sports Centre Stadium is a multi-purpose stadium in Jiaxing, China. It is currently used mostly for football matches. The stadium holds 35,000 spectators.
