= Ryotaro Yamamoto =

Japanese footballer

Ryotaro Yamamoto 山本 凌太郎
Personal information
- Full name: Ryotaro Yamamoto
- Date of birth: December 7, 1998 (age 27)
- Place of birth: Chiba, Japan
- Height: 1.72 m (5 ft 7 1/2 in)
- Position: Midfielder

Team information
- Current team: YSCC Yokohama
- Number: 21

Youth career
- 2008–2010: Ichikawa KIFC
- 2011–2016: Yokohama FC

Senior career*
Years	Team	Apps	(Gls)
2017–2019	Yokohama FC	1	(0)
2020–	YSCC Yokohama		
- * Club domestic league appearances and goals as of 2 January 2020

Ryotaro Yamamoto (山本 凌太郎, Yamamoto Ryōtarō; born December 7, 1998) is a Japanese football player. He plays for YSCC Yokohama.

== Career ==
Ryotaro Yamamoto joined J2 League club Yokohama FC in 2017. On June 21, he debuted in Emperor's Cup (v Zweigen Kanazawa).

== Club statistics ==
Updated to 22 February 2020.

Appearances and goals by club, season and competition
Club	Season	League			Emperor's Cup		Total	
Club	Season	Division	Apps	Goals	Apps	Goals	Apps	Goals
Yokohama FC	2017	J2 League	0	0	1	0	1	0
Yokohama FC	2018	J2 League	0	0	2	0	2	0
Yokohama FC	2019	J2 League	1	0	1	0	2	0
Total			1	0	4	0	5	0
