= Said Brahmi =

Qatari footballer

Personal information
- Full name: Said Mohamed Brahmi
- Date of birth: 24 June 1995 (age 31)
- Place of birth: Oran, Algeria
- Position: Midfielder

Team information
- Current team: Qatar SC
- Number: 30

Youth career
- ASPIRE

Senior career*
Years	Team	Apps	(Gls)
2014–2025	Al-Khor	67	(6)
2025–	Qatar SC	0	(0)

International career
- Qatar U19
- * Club domestic league appearances and goals

Said Brahmi (Arabic:سعيد براهمي; born 24 June 1995) is a footballer who plays for Qatar SC. Born in Algeria, he has represented Qatar under-19 level as part of the squad who competed and were eventual champions at 2014 AFC U-19 Championship.
