= Husam Kamal =

Qatari footballer (born 1996)

Personal information
- Full name: Husam Kamal Hassunin El Sayed
- Date of birth: 25 January 1996 (age 30)
- Place of birth: Qatar
- Position: Full-back

Team information
- Current team: Al Shahaniya
- Number: 24

Youth career
- –2014: AJ Auxerre
- 2014–2015: Aspire Academy

Senior career*
| Years | Team | Apps | (Gls) |
| 2016–2017 | Al-Sadd | 19 | (0) |
| 2017–2021 | Al-Arabi | 11 | (0) |
| 2018 | → Al-Rayyan (loan) | 7 | (0) |
| 2018–2019 | → Umm Salal (loan) | 16 | (0) |
| 2020–2021 | → Al-Sadd (loan) | 10 | (0) |
| 2021–2023 | Qatar | 23 | (0) |
| 2023–2024 | Umm Salal | 9 | (0) |
| 2024– | Al Shahaniya | 17 | (0) |
- * Club domestic league appearances and goals as of 17 January 2026

Husam Kamal (Arabic:حسام كمال) (born 25 January 1996) is a Qatari footballer. He currently plays for Al Shahaniya as a full back.

== Club ==
Al-Sadd

- Qatar Cup: 2021
