= Takashi Abe (footballer) =

Japanese footballer

Personal information
- Date of birth: 15 July 1997 (age 29)
- Place of birth: Osaka, Japan
- Height: 1.80 m (5 ft 11 in)
- Position: Defender

Team information
- Current team: Tegevajaro Miyazaki
- Number: 15

Youth career
- –2012: Machida JFC
- 2013–2015: Toko Gakuen High School

College career
Years	Team	Apps	(Gls)
2016–2019	Chuo University		

Senior career*
Years	Team	Apps	(Gls)
2020–24	Tokushima Vortis	86	(3)
2021–22	→ Fagiano Okayama (loan)	25	(1)
2024-	Montedio Yamagata	55	(2)
2026-	→ Tegevajaro Miyazaki (loan)	10	(0)
- * Club domestic league appearances and goals as of 16 August 2026

Takashi Abe (安部 崇士, Abe Takashi; born 15 July 1997) is a Japanese footballer currently playing as a defender for Tegevajaro Miyazaki, on loan from Montedio Yamagata.

== Career statistics ==
=== Club ===
As of 29 October 2020.

Club	Season	League			National Cup		League Cup		Other		Total	
Club	Season	Division	Apps	Goals	Apps	Goals	Apps	Goals	Apps	Goals	Apps	Goals
Tokushima Vortis	2020	J2 League	4	0	0	0	0	0	0	0	4	0
Tokushima Vortis	2021	J1 League	5	0	0	0	6 (Note: Appearances in the J.League Cup)	0	0	0	11	0
Tokushima Vortis	Total		9	0	0	0	6	0	0	0	11	0
Fagiano Okayama (loan)	2021	J2 League	2	0	0	0	0	0	0	0	2	0
Career total			11	0	0	0	6	0	0	0	13	0
