= Lee Tae-hui =

South Korean footballer (born 1995)

Personal information
- Date of birth: 26 April 1995 (age 31)
- Place of birth: South Korea
- Height: 1.87 m (6 ft 2 in)
- Position: Goalkeeper

Team information
- Current team: Incheon United
- Number: 21

Senior career*
| Years | Team | Apps | (Gls) |
| 2015– | Incheon United | 105 | (0) |
| 2024–2025 | → Geoje Citizen (army) | 42 | (0) |
- * Club domestic league appearances and goals as of 3 August 2026

Lee Tae-hui (Korean: 이태희; born 26 April 1995) is a South Korean footballer who plays for Incheon United.

== Personal life ==
His father is Lee Deok-hwa.
