= Saeed Jassim (footballer, born 1998) =

Emirati association football player

Saeed Jassim سعيد جاسم
Personal information
- Full name: Saeed Jassim Saeed Al-Saadi
- Date of birth: 29 September 1998 (age 28)
- Place of birth: Emirates
- Height: 1.76 m (5 ft 9 in)
- Position: Defender

Youth career
- –2019: Al-Ain

Senior career*
Years	Team	Apps	(Gls)
2019–2020	Al-Dhafra	2	(0)
- * Club domestic league appearances and goals

Saeed Jassim (Arabic: سعيد جاسم) (born 29 September 1998) is an Emirati footballer. He currently plays as a defender.

== Career ==
=== Al-Ain ===
Saeed Jassim started his career at Al-Ain and is a product of the Al-Ain's youth system.

=== Al Dhafra ===
On Season 2019 left Al-Ain and signed with Al-Dhafra. On 27 October 2019, Saeed Jassim made his professional debut for Al-Dhafra against Al-Wasl in the Pro League, replacing Diego Jardel.
