= Yazan Naim =

Qatari footballer (born 1997)

Personal information
- Full name: Yazan Naim Hussain
- Date of birth: 5 June 1997 (age 29)
- Place of birth: Riyadh, Saudi Arabia
- Height: 1.86 m (6 ft 1 in)
- Position: Goalkeeper

Team information
- Current team: Al Ahli
- Number: 1

Youth career
- ASPIRE

Senior career*
Years	Team	Apps	(Gls)
2015–	Al Ahli	93	(0)
2019–2020	→ Umm Salal SC (loan)	13	(0)

International career
- Qatar U20
- * Club domestic league appearances and goals as of 17 January 2026

Yazan Naim Hussain (Arabic: يزن نعيم حسين; born 5 July 1997) is a footballer who currently plays as a goalkeeper for Al Ahli SC. Born in Saudi Arabia, he has represented Qatar at youth level.

== Personal life ==
Naim was born in Saudi Arabia to Palestinian parents, and moved to Qatar at a young age. He is a youth international for Qatar.
