= Trần Ngọc Sơn (footballer, born 1996) =

Vietnamese association football player

- 2019

Personal information
- Full name: Trần Ngọc Sơn
- Date of birth: 29 October 1996 (age 29)
- Place of birth: Nghi Lộc, Nghệ An, Vietnam
- Height: 1.68 m (5 ft 6 in)
- Position: Forward

Team information
- Current team: Viettel
- Number: 9

Youth career
- 2007–2015: Viettel

Senior career*
Years	Team	Apps	(Gls)
2016–	Viettel	61	(4)
- * Club domestic league appearances and goals

Trần Ngọc Sơn (born 29 October 1996) is a Vietnamese footballer who plays as a forward for V.League 1 club Viettel.

== Honours ==
=== Club ===
Viettel

- V.League 1

(gold) Winner : 2020

- V.League 2

(silver) Runners-up : 2016

- Vietnamese Cup

(silver) Runners-up : 2020

- Vietnamese Super Cup

(silver) Runners-up : 2020
