= Nasser Al-Nasr =

Qatari footballer (born 1995)

Personal information
- Full name: Nasser Ibrahim Al-Nasr
- Date of birth: 11 July 1995 (age 31)
- Place of birth: Qatar
- Height: 1.62 m (5 ft 4 in)
- Position: Midfielder

Team information
- Current team: Al Ahli
- Number: 95

Youth career
- 2009–2015: ASPIRE
- 2012–2014: → Villarreal (loan)

Senior career*
Years	Team	Apps	(Gls)
2015–2016	Al-Sadd	1	(0)
2016–2024	Umm Salal	55	(3)
2016–2017	→ Muaither (loan)	26	(1)
2017–2018	→ Al-Markhiya (loan)	15	(1)
2020–2021	→ Qatar (loan)	7	(0)
2021	→ Al-Kharaitiyat (loan)	7	(2)
2021–2022	→ Al-Shamal (loan)	22	(2)
2024–2025	Al-Shamal	4	(0)
2025–	Al Ahli	7	(0)
- * Club domestic league appearances and goals as of 17 January 2026

Nasser Ibrahim Al-Nasr (Arabic: ناصر إبراهيم النصر; born 11 July 1995) is a Qatari footballer. He currently plays for Al Ahli as a midfielder.
