= International Thanh Niên Newspaper Cup =

- Organiser(s): Vietnam Football Federation (VFF)
- Founded: 2007
- Region: Vietnam (Asia)
- Teams: 4
- Current champions: Vietnam U-19 (1st title)
- Most championships: Vietnam U-21 (6 titles)
- 2022 International Thanh Niên Newspaper Cup

The International Thanh Niên Newspaper Cup (Vietnamese: Giải bóng đá U-21 Quốc tế Báo Thanh Niên) is an annual football tournament held in Vietnam. The tournament was officially launched in 2007 by Thanh Niên News in co-operation with the Vietnam Football Federation, with the aim of improving youth football in Vietnam. In addition to improving the quality of football in the country, the tournament also serve to help VFF selectors build up the next generation of players who would represent Vietnam at the senior and U23 levels. Originally held as an under-21 tournament from 2007 to 2019, the tournament changed its format in 2022 when the edition only included under-19 teams.

During the first edition of the tournament, which lasted from 24 to 28 October 2007, host nation Vietnam competed against four visiting teams from Indonesia, Myanmar, Singapore and Thailand. Vietnam won the first edition of the tournament, with Thailand finishing as runners-up.

== Results ==
| Year | Final | | | Third Place Match | | |
| Year | Winner | Score | Runner-up | Third Place | Score | Fourth Place |
|---|---|---|---|---|---|---|
| 2007 | Vietnam | 1–0; Report | Thailand | Singapore | 2–1; Report | Myanmar |
| 2008 | Iran | 2–1; Report | Thailand | Vietnam | 1–0; Report | Singapore |
| 2009 | China | 4–2; Report | Vietnam | Vietnam | 2–1; Report | Singapore |
| 2010 | Vietnam | 2–1; Report | Thailand | Vietnam | 1–0; Report | Malaysia |
| 2011 | Vietnam | 2–1; Report | Iran | Aspire Football Academy (Qatar) | 2–1; Report | Thailand |
| 2012 | Malaysia | 1–0; Report | Vietnam | Sydney FC U21 (Australia) | 2–1; Report | Thailand |
| 2013 | Vietnam | 1–1 (4–1 (p)); Report | (Australia) Sydney U21 | Malaysia | 2–1; Report | Myanmar |
| 2014 | Hoang Anh Gia Lai U19 (Vietnam) | 3–0; Report | Thailand | Vietnam | 2–1; Report | Malaysia |
| 2015 | Hoang Anh Gia Lai U21 (Vietnam) | 2–0; Report | South Korea | Singapore | 1–1 (6–5 (p)); Report | Vietnam |
| 2016 | Yokohama U21 (Japan) | 1–0; Report | Thailand | Hoang Anh Gia Lai U21 (Vietnam) | 1–0; Report | Vietnam |
| 2017 | Yokohama U21 (Japan) | 2–0; Report | Vietnam | Myanmar | 4–2; Report | Thailand |
| 2018 | Vietnam | 2–2 (5–3 (p)); Report | Myanmar | Malaysia | 2–0; Report | (South Korea) Gimhae CFC U21 |
| 2019 | Vietnam | 2–0; Report | Japan University Selection | FK Sarajevo U19 (Bosnia and Herzegovina) | 1–0; Report | (South Korea) Hanyang University U21 |
| 2022 | Vietnam U19 | 1–1 (4–3 (p)) | Malaysia U19 | Thailand U19 | 7-3 | (Myanmar) Myanmar U19 |
