= Saeed Jassim (footballer, born 1995) =

Emirati footballer

Personal information
- Full name: Saeed Jassim Saleh
- Date of birth: 2 March 1995 (age 31)
- Place of birth: United Arab Emirates
- Height: 1.62 m (5 ft 4 in)
- Position: Forward

Youth career
- Al Ahli

Senior career*
Years	Team	Apps	(Gls)
2014–2022	Shabab Al-Ahli	28	(4)
2018	→ Al Dhafra (loan)	1	(0)
2019–2021	→ Hatta (loan)	22	(1)
2021–2022	→ Ajman (loan)	14	(1)
2022–2023	Ajman	5	(0)
2023–2024	Al Dhafra		
2024–2025	Dibba		
2025–2026	Al-Arabi		
- * Club domestic league appearances and goals

Saeed Jassim (Arabic:سعيد جاسم) (born 2 March 1995) is an Emirati footballer who plays as a forward.
