= Jassem Al-Jalabi =

Qatari footballer (born 1996)

Personal information
- Full name: Jassem Ahmed Ali Al-Jalabi
- Date of birth: 21 February 1996 (age 30)
- Place of birth: Qatar
- Height: 1.75 m (5 ft 9 in)
- Position: Striker

Team information
- Current team: Mesaimeer
- Number: 9

Youth career
- –2014: AJ Auxerre
- 2014–2015: Aspire Academy

Senior career*
| Years | Team | Apps | (Gls) |
| 2015–2021 | Al-Wakrah | 28 | (0) |
| 2015 | → SPG FC Pasching/LASK Juniors (loan) | 3 | (0) |
| 2021–2022 | Mesaimeer | | |
| 2022–2025 | Qatar | 46 | (1) |
| 2025– | Mesaimeer | | |

International career
- Qatar U20
- Qatar U23
- * Club domestic league appearances and goals

Jassem Al-Jalabi (Arabic:جاسم الجلابي) (born 21 February 1996) is a Qatari footballer who currently plays for Mesaimeer as a forward.
