= Ahmed Rabee =

Emirati footballer (born 1995)

Personal information
- Full name: Ahmed Rabee Saleh Al-Ghilani
- Date of birth: 14 August 1995 (age 31)
- Place of birth: United Arab Emirates
- Height: 1.73 m (5 ft 8 in)
- Position: Striker

Youth career
- Al Jazira

Senior career*
Years	Team	Apps	(Gls)
2013–2021	Al Jazira	57	(4)
2018	→ Baniyas (loan)		
2021–2023	Baniyas	12	(1)

International career
2016–	United Arab Emirates		
- * Club domestic league appearances and goals

Ahmed Rabee Saleh Al-Ghilani (Arabic:أحمد ربيع) (born 14 August 1995) is an Emirati footballer who plays as a striker.
