= Lee Jeong-bin =

South Korean footballer

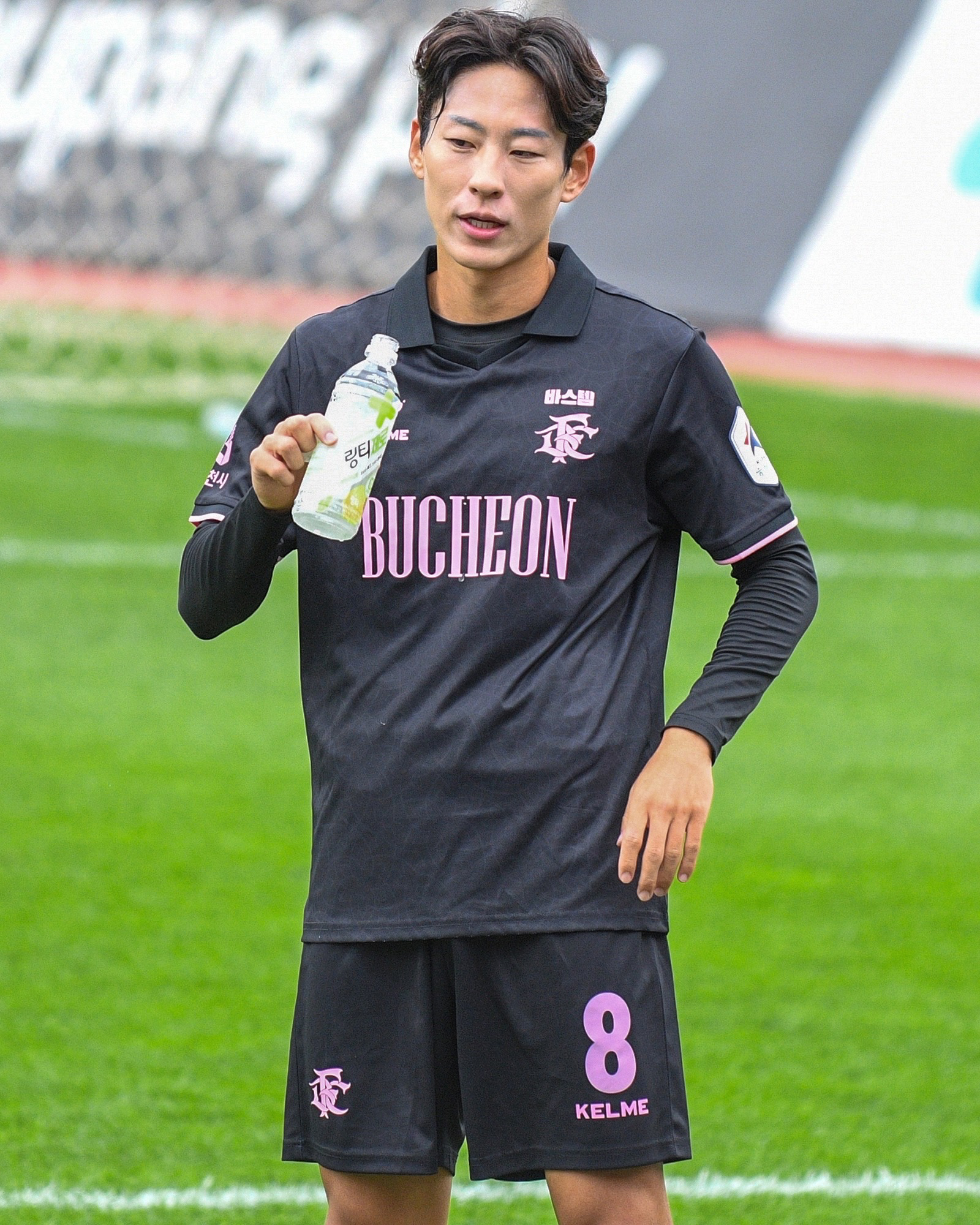
- Lee in 2024

Personal information
- Date of birth: 11 January 1995 (age 31)
- Place of birth: South Korea
- Height: 1.73 m (5 ft 8 in)
- Position: Midfielder

Team information
- Current team: Seongnam FC
- Number: 8

Youth career
- 2011–2013: Daegun High School
- 2014–2016: Incheon National University

Senior career*
Years	Team	Apps	(Gls)
2017–2019	Incheon United	29	(1)
2019	→ FC Anyang (loan)	20	(4)
2020–2022	FC Anyang	45	(4)
2020–2021	→ Sangju / Gimcheon Sangmu (army)	2	(0)
2023–2024	Bucheon FC 1995	36	(7)
2025–	Seongnam FC	38	(8)

International career^{‡}
2013–2014	South Korea U-20	10	(5)
2015	South Korea U-23	1	(0)
- * Club domestic league appearances and goals as of 6 August 2026 ‡ National team caps and goals as of March 13, 2017

- Lee Jeong-bin
- Hangul: 이정빈
- RR: I Jeongbin
- MR: I Chŏngbin

Lee Jeong-bin (Korean: 이정빈; born 11 January 1995) is a South Korean football midfielder who plays for Seongnam FC.
