= Cần Thơ Stadium =

Multi-use stadium in Cần Thơ, Vietnam

- Vietnamese: Sân vận động Cần Thơ
- Interactive map of Cần Thơ Stadium
- Location: Lê Lợi Boulevard, Ninh Kiều District, Cần Thơ
- Coordinates: 10°02′56″N 105°47′20″E
- Owner: Cần Thơ
- Operator: XSKT Can Tho F.C., Cần Thơ City
- Capacity: 30,000+
- Surface: Grass

Construction
- Groundbreaking: 1950
- Built: 1950–1953
- Opened: 26 September 1953
- Renovated: 25 March 1998
- Cost: Daydé-Pillié
- Architect: Philipp Holzmann AG International

Tenants
- XSKT Can Tho F.C. Vietnam national football team (Selected matches)

Cần Thơ Stadium (Vietnamese: Sân vận động Cần Thơ) is a multi-use stadium located in Ninh Kiều District, Cần Thơ, Vietnam. Holding over 30,000 people, Cần Thơ is one of the largest stadiums in the country. The stadium is mostly used for football matches and motorcycle racing. It is the home stadium of XSKT Can Tho F.C.

The stadium cost approximately 80 billion VND to build.

== History ==
The Cần Thơ Stadium was built during the French colonial era (1934). It was repaired and upgraded in 1981. On 28 October 2014, the stadium recorded a record number of Vietnamese football fans with over 60,000 visitors.

In April 2016, the Cantho lottery owner and the general public supported the decision to upgrade the 40m high A-domed stand with approximately 17 billion VND.

The stadium's capacity was reduced from 50,000+ seats to 30,000 during the 2017–19 reconstruction when individual bucket seats were installed.

== Location ==
The stadium is located on the banks of the Hau River, next to the old Cần Thơ ferry, on Lê Lợi Boulevard, Ninh Kiều District, Cần Thơ. The satellite stadium is the 9th Military Stadium.

== Facilities ==
Capacity (estimated):

- Stand A: 20,000 seats (85 VIP seats).
- Stand B: 20,000 seats.
- Stand C: 10,000 seats.
- Stand D: 10,000 seats.

Total: 60,000 seats

The stadium is divided into four stands identified by different colours (green, red, yellow, blue). Tower A is considered the VIP section. Stand B, C, D are built in a C shape, with concrete arranged in the same way as Stand A. B stage contains over a hundred refurbished seats from the old Stand A.

The unique feature of the Can Tho stadium is that the stands use the form of the surrounding landfill to form the pan basin. At the top of the stage, a 6-meter wide walkway provides access. The ground was covered with soil, so trees were planted to form natural shade.

The surface of the field is 120m x 90m, utilizing a high-quality grass surface to ensure good performance during heavy rain. The yard has two technical rooms for television stations and other press agencies; running eight lines, modern electronic scoreboards and four lamp posts for matches and evening events.

== Usage ==
Can Tho's football club competes in the country's highest league. Spectators come to watch the home team's matches after the sale is open. In the 90's when Can Tho was successfully playing in the A1 national tournament, the average audience was about 10,000 per match. At Can Tho the audience only fills the stadium when international football tournaments are playing and when the stadium organizes motorcycle racing.

Racing is popular with Can Tho people and neighboring provinces. One-year motor racing is usually held three times a day on the 4th Lunar New Year, 30 April and 2 September. The races are divided into two categories: the movement consists of 32 athletes (athletes) participate, running 4 pairs of type 2 for each, to the finals run 10 rounds.
