= Trần Minh Vương =

Vietnamese footballer (born 1995)

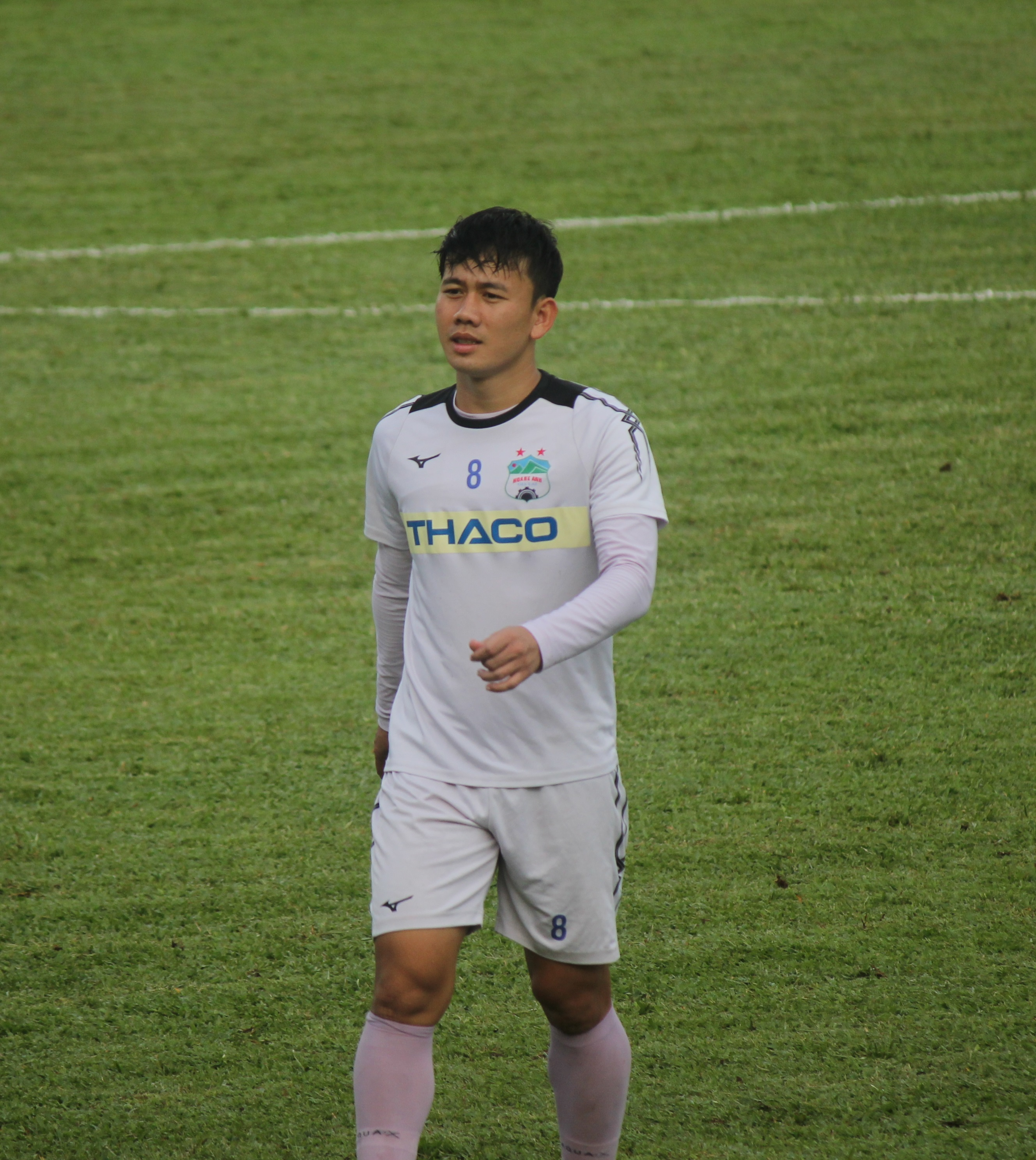
- Minh Vương in 2019

Personal information
- Full name: Trần Minh Vương
- Date of birth: 28 March 1995 (age 31)
- Place of birth: Thái Thụy, Thái Bình, Vietnam
- Height: 1.66 m (5 ft 5 in)
- Position: Attacking midfielder

Team information
- Current team: Công An Nhân Dân
- Number: 8

Youth career
- 2007–2013: Hoàng Anh Gia Lai

Senior career*
Years	Team	Apps	(Gls)
2013–2025	Hoàng Anh Gia Lai	234	(49)
2025–2026	Trường Tươi Đồng Nai	20	(7)
2026–	Công An Nhân Dân	1	(0)

International career^{‡}
2013–2014	Vietnam U19	2	(0)
2017–2018	Vietnam U23	3	(1)
2017–2022	Vietnam	7	(1)
Medal record
Men's football
Representing Vietnam
AFF U-19 Youth Championship
Runner-up	Vietnam 2014	Team
- * Club domestic league appearances and goals as of 11 September 2026 ‡ National team caps and goals as of 27 January 2022

Trần Minh Vương (born 28 March 1995) is a Vietnamese professional footballer who plays as an attacking midfielder for V.League 2 club Công An Nhân Dân.

== Club career ==
=== Hoàng Anh Gia Lai ===
In 2007, Minh Vương came to Ham Rong to take the exam for HAGL – Arsenal JMG Academy. However, he was only selected for the gifted class instead of the elite class.

In April 2013, coach Choi Yun-kyum promoted Minh Vương to Hoàng Anh Gia Lai's first team to compete in the V.League 1, marking a new turning point in his career path. In the 2014 season, he received the V.League 1's Best young player of the Season award.

In March 2024, after Nguyễn Tuấn Anh left Hoàng Anh Gia Lai, Minh Vương became the captain of the club. After 2024–25 V.League 1 ended, Trần Minh Vương officially left Hoàng Anh Gia Lai after nearly 18 years with the club.

=== Trường Tươi Đồng Nai ===
In July 2025, after Minh Vương's contract with Hoàng Anh Gia Lai expired, he moved to V.League 2 side Trường Tươi Đồng Nai.

=== Công An Nhân Dân ===
In September 2026, Minh Vương was transferred to V.League 2 club Công An Nhân Dân.

== International career ==
=== Vietnam U-19 ===
In 2013, Trần Minh Vương was called up to the Vietnam U19 reserve team, but did not participate in the U19 Southeast Asian Games. In April 2013, he was named by coach Choi Yoon Gyum to the Hoàng Anh Gia Lai for the V.League. In the 2014 V.League, he was named the best young player of the tournament In July 2014, Minh Vương was officially called back to the Vietnam U19 team.

=== Vietnam U-23 ===
In December 2017, Minh Vương was called up to the Vietnam U-23 squad by coach Park Hang-seo.

In July 2018, Minh Vương was named in the official list of thirty Vietnam U-23 players to participate in the 2018 Vinaphone Cup. At the 2018 Asian Games, due to defender Nguyen Thanh Chung's injury, Trần Minh Vương was called back to the Vietnam Olympic team by Park Hang Seo just before leaving for Indonesia.

=== Vietnam ===
In 2017, Minh Vương was called up to the Vietnam national team for the first time to prepare for the match against the Afghanistan in the 2019 Asian Cup qualifiers.

On 15 June 2021, in the match against the UAE in the Second Round of the 2022 World Cup qualifiers, Minh Vương came on in the last 30 minutes of the match and scored a goal and an assist.

== Personal life ==
When Minh Vương was young his father drove him to the HAGL – Arsenal JMG Academy so he could continue to develop his football skills. Just 3 days later his father died, and Minh Vương didn't find out until a couple months after as his family had withheld the news from him. As a result, whenever Minh Vương scores he points to the sky in remembrance of his father.

== Career statistics ==
=== Club ===
As of match played 6 June 2026

Appearances and goals by club, season and competition
Club	Season	League			National cup		Continental		Other		Total	
Club	Season	Division	Apps	Goals	Apps	Goals	Apps	Goals	Apps	Goals	Apps	Goals
Hoàng Anh Gia Lai	2014	V.League 1	15	2	3	1	—		—		18	3
Hoàng Anh Gia Lai	2015	V.League 1	15	1	2	0	—		—		17	1
Hoàng Anh Gia Lai	2016	V.League 1	24	8	4	2	—		—		28	10
Hoàng Anh Gia Lai	2017	V.League 1	17	3	1	1	—		—		18	4
Hoàng Anh Gia Lai	2018	V.League 1	25	8	4	0	—		—		29	8
Hoàng Anh Gia Lai	2019	V.League 1	25	12	3	1	—		—		28	13
Hoàng Anh Gia Lai	2020	V.League 1	11	0	1	0	—		—		12	0
Hoàng Anh Gia Lai	2021	V.League 1	11	4	1	0	—		—		12	4
Hoàng Anh Gia Lai	2022	V.League 1	24	3	3	0	5 (Note: Appearances in the AFC Champions League)	0	—		32	3
Hoàng Anh Gia Lai	2023	V.League 1	18	3	2	1	—		—		20	4
Hoàng Anh Gia Lai	2023–24	V.League 1	24	2	1	0	—		—		25	2
Hoàng Anh Gia Lai	2024–25	V.League 1	25	3	2	0	—		—		27	3
Hoàng Anh Gia Lai	Total		234	49	27	6	5	0	0	0	266	55
Trường Tươi Đồng Nai	2025–26	V.League 2	20	7	3	2	—		—		23	9
Total career			254	56	30	8	5	0	0	0	289	64

=== International ===
National team	Years	Apps	Goals
Vietnam	2018	1	0
Vietnam	2019	3	0
Vietnam	2021	2	1
Vietnam	2022	1	0
Vietnam	Total	7	1

As of 27 January 2022

==== International goals ====
===== Senior =====
#	Date	Venue	Opponent	Score	Result	Competition
1.	15 June 2021	Zabeel Stadium, Dubai, United Arab Emirates	United Arab Emirates	2–3	2–3	2022 FIFA World Cup qualification

===== U-23 / Olympics =====
#	Date	Venue	Opponent	Score	Result	Competition
1.	29 August 2018	Cibinong, Indonesia	South Korea	1–3	1–3	2018 Asian Games

== Honours ==
Trường Tươi Đồng Nai

- V.League 2: 2025–26

Vietnam

- King's Cup: Runner-up 2019

Vietnam U23

- VFF Cup: 2018

Vietnam U19

- AFF U-19 Youth Championship: Runner-up 2014

Individual

- V.League 1 Best Young Player of the Season: 2013, 2014
- V.League 1 Team of the Season: 2019
- V.League 2 Player of the Year: 2025–26
- V.League 2 Team of the Season: 2025–26
