= Nguyễn Công Phượng =

Vietnamese footballer (born 1995)

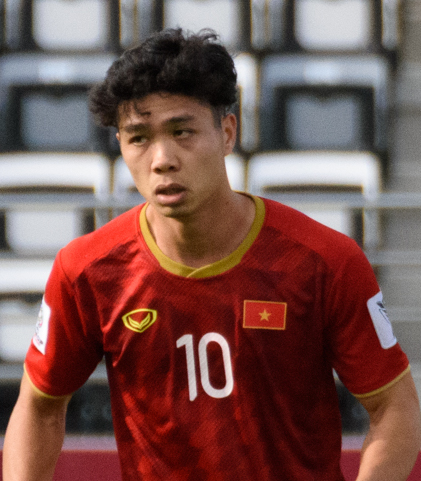
- Công Phượng with Vietnam at the 2019 AFC Asian Cup

Personal information
- Full name: Nguyễn Công Phượng
- Date of birth: 21 January 1995 (age 31)
- Place of birth: Đô Lương, Nghệ An, Vietnam
- Height: 1.69 m (5 ft 7 in)
- Positions: Forward; attacking midfielder

Team information
- Current team: Đồng Nai City
- Number: 10

Youth career
- 2007–2014: Hoàng Anh Gia Lai

Senior career*
Years	Team	Apps	(Gls)
2015–2023	Hoàng Anh Gia Lai	103	(36)
2016	→ Mito HollyHock (loan)	5	(0)
2019	→ Incheon United (loan)	8	(0)
2019	→ Sint-Truiden (loan)	1	(0)
2020	→ Hồ Chí Minh City (loan)	12	(6)
2023–2024	Yokohama FC	0	(0)
2024–	Đồng Nai City	23	(10)

International career^{‡}
2013–2014	Vietnam U19	22	(14)
2015–2018	Vietnam U23	64	(27)
2015–2023	Vietnam	56	(12)
Medal record
Men's football
Representing Vietnam
AFF U-19 Youth Championship
Runner-up	Indonesia 2013	Team
Runner-up	Vietnam 2014	Team
Southeast Asian Games
Bronze medal – third place	Singapore 2015	Team
AFC U-23 Championship
Runner-up	China 2018	Team
AFF Championship
Winner	ASEAN 2018	Team
- * Club domestic league appearances and goals as of 6 November 2026 ‡ National team caps and goals as of 11 September 2023, 21:00 (UTC)

Nguyễn Công Phượng (born 21 January 1995) is a Vietnamese professional footballer who plays as a forward or an attacking midfielder for V.League 1 club Đồng Nai City.

Công Phuợng is lauded as "Vietnamese Messi" by fans and the media due to his playing style and physique, Công Phượng is one of the most promising football talents in Vietnam. He is a product of HAGL – Arsenal JMG Academy and was promoted to Hoàng Anh Gia Lai senior team in 2015. Công Phượng was voted in 2015 as the "Best Young Player of the Year". He has played in Belgium, South Korea and Japan.

== Early life ==
Công Phượng was born on 21 January 1995 in Mỹ Sơn, Đô Lương District, Nghệ An Province. He is the fifth child out of 17 children of Nguyễn Công Bảy and Nguyễn Thị Hoa; his family was poor when he was growing up.

Công Phượng has been interested in football since his childhood. Around the age of 5, he started to play football using a ball made of straw with his 2-year-older brother Nguyễn Công Khoa, who later drowned in 2004 at the age of 9.

== Club career ==
=== Early career ===
Công Phượng first started his proper football training at the age of 10 when he was introduced to the Đô Lương district sport center by a local football coach Trương Quang Vinh. In 2006, he played for the Đô Lương District youth team at Nghệ An province's football competition. Impressed Song Lam Nghe An's staff at the competition, Công Phượng was invited into Sông Lam Nghệ An youth team but after a month of trial, he wasn't accepted because he didn't meet the weight requirement. Công Phượng's weight at that time was only 25.4 kg, while the minimum requirement was 30 kg and 27 kg for special cases. In 2007, upon hearing the news about HAGL – Arsenal JMG Academy recruitment program, Công Phượng persuaded his parent to bring him to Pleiku, where HAGL – Arsenal JMG Academy based for the try-out. He was one of the only 14 candidates who was accepted in to the academy out of about 7 thousand candidates from all over the country in the first selection.

In June 2010, Công Phượng and Nguyễn Tuấn Anh were the only two players from HAGL– Arsenal JMG Academy that were invited to a 15 days overseas training program in Cambodia. It was a training program for top players of JMG Academy from all over the globe.

In November 2012, Công Phượng along with Nguyễn Tuấn Anh, Lương Xuân Trường, Trần Hữu Đông Triều were four of the players from the academy received the invitation to train with English Premier League side Arsenal under-17 team. In the letter, Arsenal's performance supervisor, Steve Morrow stated that manager Arsène Wenger was impressed with the academy's players when they beat Oxford United under-17 team in January 2013.

In winter 2014, HAGL – Arsenal JMG Academy team defeated Nepal U21 3–0 in the International U21 Thanh Niên Newspaper Cup final. A double by Công Phượng secured the crown for his team.

=== Hoàng Anh Gia Lai ===
==== 2015: First season ====
In 2015, Hoàng Anh Gia Lai revolutionized their first team, the club released most of their players in the senior team, only a few players was kept to guide young player from the academy. Công Phượng was promoted to first team along with other academy's player from the first selection. Công Phượng was given number 44 shirt instead of number 10 which he always wore when play for academy team and national U–19 team.

Công Phượng made his V.League 1 debut on 4 January 2015 at the opening game of the season against Sanna Khánh Hòa. HAGL won this game 4–2 as Công Phượng scored a brace. Công Phượng scored another brace at the eighth round against Đồng Tháp. Công Phượng finished 2015 season with 6 goals in 25 appearances, he was club's leading goalscorer and had second most appearance. On 6 January 2016, Công Phượng won the 2015 young player of the year award, beating his club mate Nguyễn Tuấn Anh who won it the previous year and Hà Nội's player Đỗ Duy Mạnh.

==== 2017 season: Improvement ====
After one season in Japan, Công Phượng returned to HAGL to play in 2017 V.League. He scored 7 goals in that season.

==== 2018 season: Outstanding individual performance ====
2018 was one of his best season for HAGL. Công Phượng scored 12 goals at league and 4 goals at domestic cup.

Although his club just finished 11th at the end of season, Phượng was still selected in V.League's Team of the season by his performances.

==== 2021 season: Dream season ====
Công Phượng returned to the club after his loan contract with Hồ Chí Minh City get expired, followed by the arrival of the new coach Kiatisak Senamuang.

Phượng and HAGL was on fire that season, they were top of the table after 12 rounds, but the season was cancelled due to COVID-19. He had 6 goals after 12 matches in that campaign.

==== 2022 season: Last year at Pleiku ====
2022 was his last season at HAGL. On 19 April, Phượng got an assist in 1–1 draw against Sydney FC at 2022 AFC Champions League group stage. He just scored 5 goals in 24 matches, all of them were in the league.

=== Mito HollyHock (loan) ===
In 2016, Công Phượng has been loaned to Mito HollyHock for $100,000 in the J2 League. On 7 May 2016, Công Phượng made his debut for Mito HollyHock, coming on as a substitute in the 87-minute in a match against Giravanz Kitakyushu that ended 1–0.

=== Incheon United (loan) ===
On 13 February 2019, he was loaned to K League 1 team Incheon United on a loan deal until the end of 2019 season. He made the debut for the club in the 2–1 victory against Gyeongnam, came as a substitute in the extra time of the second half.

On 1 June 2019, after just half season of the loan contract, he was released by Incheon United, which followed his desire. After 14 rounds of 2019 K League 1, he only played 401 minutes among 8 games for the team, and didn't score any goal.

=== Sint-Truiden (loan) ===
On 30 June 2019, a Japanese newspaper named Sponichi confirmed that Công Phượng was going to join Sint-Truiden on loan for 1 season. He made his debut for Sint-Truiden, in the 0–6 defeat against Club Brugge on 2 August, coming on in the 70th minute. However, he was excluded permanently from the squad after this game. He was mainly used for the youth team, had played 5 games and scored 1 goal against Club Brugge U21 on 27 August 2019.

After the failure half-season at STVV, Công Phượng returnted to Vietnam and played for Ho Chi Minh City, the runner-up of 2019 V.League 1, on another loan contract.

=== Hồ Chí Minh City ===
Công Phượng scored his first goal for the club in 2020 AFC Cup group stage match against Myanmar club Yangon United on 11 February 2020.

Công Phượng had the first time playing a final match at the club level, against Hà Nội at Vietnamese Super Cup. At the 20th minute, he surprised the audience by a long shot to bring an advantage to his club. But with a higher level of skills and experience, Hà Nội quickly controlled the match and scored 2 goals to win the match.

On 17 June, he scored a goal and assisted another in a 3–0 victory against Viettel. He did the same against Than Quảng Ninh on 11 July, also a 3–0 victory.

On 26 September, Công Phượng impressively scored a brace in the 5–1 victory against Nam Định, but later he got toe injured during the game which made him be almost absent for the rest of 2020 season. He finally comeback in the club's last match of the season, against Becamex Bình Dương, coming as a substitute in 64th minute. In total, Công Phượng had 10 goals after 19 appearances during the loan spell at the Red Battle Ship.

=== Yokohama FC ===
On 25 December 2022, Công Phượng was officially announced as a new signing of newly promoted J1 League side Yokohama FC. He made his debut for the club on 5 April 2023 when coming on as a substitute, a 2–3 loss against Nagoya Grampus in the J.League Cup.

On 24 April 2024, he made his first start for the club in the 2024 J.League Cup fixture against Fagiano Okayama.

On 14 September 2024, he has decided to left the club after 2 years without much playing time.

=== Đồng Nai City ===
Following the departure from Yokohama FC, Công Phượng returned to Vietnam. There were rumours that he could join a V.League 2 club as the summer transfer market for Vietnamese player of 2024–25 V.League 1 has been closed.

On 21 September 2024, Phượng signed a 3-year contract with V.League 2 side Trường Tươi Bình Phước. He scored the first goal for the club in the debut match on 19 October, against LPBank Ho Chi Minh City in a Vietnamese Cup game. Công Phượng had a great start in Truong Tuoi Binh Phuoc shirt with 5 goals after 6 matches, 4 in V.League 2 and 1 in the cup.

On 12 January 2025, he scored against his former club Hoàng Anh Gia Lai when returned to Pleiku Stadium, in the Vietnamese Cup game. However, his side was eliminated when losing on penalties, after a 1–1 draw in official time.

On 20 June, Phượng scored two free-kick goals in a game against Hòa Bình. Six days later, he scored another free-kick against Đồng Tháp and became the first Vietnamese footballer to score three free-kick goals in two consecutive matches.

On 22 March 2025, Phượng was confirmed that he has been diagnosed with a meniscus tear, the injury on his knee that doesn't require surgery, but it will still keep him sidelined for a long time, meaning he will miss the 2025–26 V.League 2 season for 1 month, 24 days (55 days).

On 16 May 2026, during the match against Hồ Chí Minh City Youth, Phượng returned to score after the injury on the 86th minute, scoring his third goal of the match and first goal of his season.

After their promotion to the Vietnamese top-flight, Trường Tươi Đồng Nai changed their name to Đồng Nai City. On 4 September 2026, Công Phượng appeared in his first V.League 1 game after 6 years, appearing in Đồng Nai City's 0–2 defeat to Thể Công–Viettel in the first matchday of the 2026–27 V.League 1.

== International career ==
=== Youth ===
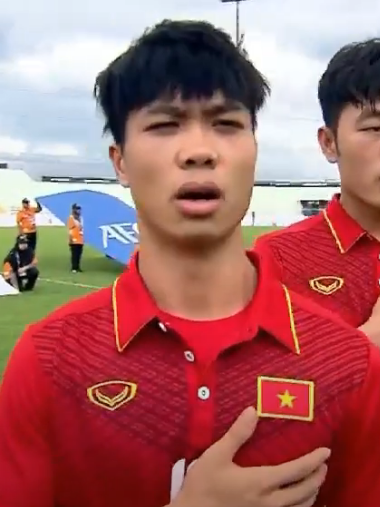
Công Phượng with Vietnam U22 at the 2017 SEA Games

Công Phượng was first called up to Vietnam U-19 team in September 2013 to participate in 2013 AFF U-19 Youth Championship. The team made it into the final with unbeaten run of five wins but eventually lost out to host nation Indonesia U–19 in the penalty shoot-out (7–6). Công Phượng scored twice in this competition.

Công Phượng was the top goal scorer at the 2014 AFC U-19 Championship qualification held in October 2013. He scored 7 goals which include a brace against Australia U–19, the game ended with a shocking result of 5–1 win for U–19 Vietnam. His team finished at the top of the group with 9 points and qualified for the final tournament.

At the 2014 AFF U-19 Youth Championship in September 2014, Công Phượng scored a stunning solo goal against Australia U–19 right at the end of the game which help his team achieve a 1–0 victory. The goal was voted as goal of tournament; this goal helped to raise Công Phượng's popularity even more. Công Phượng scored another goal in the game against U–19 Japan. His team made it into the final and ended up as runner up after lost the game 0–1 to Japan U–19.

Công Phượng captained his team at 2014 AFC U-19 Championship held in October 2014. They were put in a tough group with other Asia powerhouses, Japan U–19, South Korea U–19, and China U–19. His team failed to make it through the group stage with 2 losses and 1 draw. This is Công Phượng's last tournament with the U–19 side.

In March 2015, Công Phượng represented Vietnam U-23 at 2016 AFC U-23 Championship qualification. He scored 4 goals that helped the team to qualify for the final tournament in 2016.

Công Phượng was a part of Vietnam's squad that played at 2015 SEA Games. His team won the bronze medal, Công Phượng contributed 3 goals, one of which against Malaysia was voted as goal of the tournament.

Công Phượng had a good individual performance at 2017 SEA Games by scoring 4 goals, but his team was unfortunately eliminated in the group stage. He also missed the penalty in the crucial game against Thailand, which lost a good chance for his team to bounce back, when Vietnam was being led 0–2.

Công Phượng scored 4 goals at 2018 AFC U-23 Championship qualification and one goal at 2018 AFC U-23 Championship against Iraq. In this tournament, Công Phượng did a good job in his role as a "virtual striker" and helped Vietnam U-23 reach the final, which was a historic achievement of Vietnamese youth football in the continental level.

Công Phượng was in the Vietnam Olympic's squad participating in 2018 Asian Games, where his team successfully achieved the fourth place. Công Phượng played relatively well in the tournament by scoring 2 goals, but he also missed many good chances to score more goal. He especially missed 2 penalties in the opening game against Pakistan.

=== Senior ===
Công Phượng made his debut for the senior national team as the substitution on 77th min at 2018 FIFA World Cup qualification (AFC) game against Iraq on 8 October 2015. 5 days later, he once again came from the substitution, but played the whole second half in the match against Thailand.

He scored the first goal for the national team in the 3–2 victory of the friendly match against Indonesia on 8 November 2016.

==== 2016 AFF Championship ====
In 2016 AFF Championship, Công Phượng played 4 matches but just started 1 match, against Cambodia. Vietnam ended the tournament in semi-finals, when they lost to Indonesia.

==== 2018 AFF Championship ====
Công Phượng was an important player of Vietnam squad at 2018 AFF Championship when he scored 3 goals including two in group stage, against Laos in the first match, Malaysia in the second match and one in the 2nd leg of semi-finals, against Philippines at Mỹ Đình National Stadium. In the finals, Vietnam defeated Malaysia to become champions after 10 years.

==== 2019 AFC Asian Cup ====
Selected for the 2019 Asian Cup, Phượng scored 2 goals in the continental tournament. His first goal of the tournament in the first match against Iraq where he scored the second goal of Vietnam, although Vietnam were defeated 2–3. In the round of 16 on 20 January, Công Phượng had equalized against Jordan in the early second half, before Vietnam eliminated the Al-Nashama on penalty shoot-out; thus contributing to the very good course of the Golden Dragons, quarter finalists to everyone's surprise of the continental edition.

==== FIFA World Cup 2022 qualification ====
Công Phượng scored the third goal in 4–0 victory against Indonesia in the second qualifying round of the 2022 FIFA World Cup.

In the third qualifying round, he assisted Nguyễn Thanh Bình to lead against Japan, then the Japanese team equalized thanks to Maya Yoshida's goal. The game ended 1–1, which was a historical result of Vietnam against a giant of Asian football.

==== 2020 AFF Championship ====
In the 2020 AFF Championship, Phượng scored 2 goals. Vietnam ended the tournament in the semi-finals after losing to Thailand, tied for 3rd place with Singapore.

==== Absence ====
Before 2022 AFF Championship, he asked coach Park Hang-seo's permission not to attend the tournament.

On 11 September 2023, under new head coach Philippe Troussier, Công Phượng scored one goal in a friendly match against Palestine, which Vietnam won 2–0. This was his first goal for the national team after almost 2 years.

Công Phượng was not called up for the 2023 AFC Asian Cup because he didn't have much playing time at Yokohama in 2023 season.

In March 2024, he was called up for 2 matches against Indonesia in 2026 FIFA World Cup qualification, but has been ruled out due to injury. He then was not called up by the new manager Kim Sang-sik for the 2024 ASEAN Championship.

On 22 May 2025, he was called up for the first time under Kim Sang-sik, for a match against Malaysia in 2027 AFC Asian Cup qualification. This is his return for the national team after almost 2 years of absent. But on 3 June 2025, he was injured and had to forfeit the call-up.

== Career statistics ==
=== Club ===
As of match played 6 November 2026

Appearances and goals by club, season and competition
Club	Season	League			National Cup		Continental		Other		Total	
Club	Season	Division	Apps	Goals	Apps	Goals	Apps	Goals	Apps	Goals	Apps	Goals
Hoàng Anh Gia Lai	2015	V.League 1	25	6	2	0	—		—		27	6
Hoàng Anh Gia Lai	2017	V.League 1	26	7	1	0	—		—		27	7
Hoàng Anh Gia Lai	2018	V.League 1	24	12	4	4	—		—		28	16
Hoàng Anh Gia Lai	2021	V.League 1	12	6	0	0	—		—		12	6
Hoàng Anh Gia Lai	2022	V.League 1	16	5	2	0	6 (Note: Appearances in AFC Champions League)	0	—		24	5
Hoàng Anh Gia Lai	Total		103	36	9	4	6	0	0	0	118	40
Mito HollyHock (loan)	2016	J2 League	5	0	2	0	—		—		7	0
Incheon United (loan)	2019	K League 1	8	0	1	0	—		—		9	0
STVV Sint-Truidense (loan)	2019–20	Belgian Pro League	1	0	0	0	—		—		1	0
Hồ Chí Minh City (loan)	2020	V.League 1	12	6	2	1	4 (Note: One appearance in AFC Champions League; three appearances and two goals in AFC Cup)	2	1 (Note: Appearance in Vietnamese Super Cup)	1	19	10
Yokohama	2023	J1 League	0	0	0	0	—		1 (Note: Appearance(s) in J.League Cup)	0	1	0
Yokohama	2024	J2 League	0	0	0	0	—		2	0	2	0
Yokohama	Total		0	0	0	0	0	0	3	0	3	0
Đồng Nai City	2024–25	V.League 2	14	7	2	2	—		1 (Note: Appearance in the V.League 1 promotion play-offs)	0	17	9
Đồng Nai City	2025–26	V.League 2	4	3	0	0	—		—		4	3
Đồng Nai City	2026–27	V.League 1	5	0	1	1	—		—		6	1
Đồng Nai City	Total		23	10	3	3	0	0	1	0	27	13
Career total			150	51	17	8	10	2	5	1	182	62

=== International ===
Appearances and goals by national team and year
National team	Year	Apps	Goals
Vietnam
Vietnam	2015	2	0
Vietnam	2016	7	1
Vietnam	2017	6	2
Vietnam	2018	9	3
Vietnam	2019	11	2
Vietnam	2021	13	3
Vietnam	2022	6	0
Vietnam	2023	2	1
Total		56	12

=== International goals ===
==== U-19 ====
#	Date	Venue	Opponent	Score	Result	Competition
1.	10 September 2013	Gresik, Petrokimia Stadium	Thailand	1–1	3–2	2013 AFF U-19 Youth Championship
2.	20 September 2013	Gresik, Petrokimia Stadium	Laos	1–0	1–0	2013 AFF U-19 Youth Championship
3.	3 October 2013	Kuala Lumpur, KLFA Stadium	Chinese Taipei	1–0	6–1	2014 AFC U-19 Championship qualification
4.	3 October 2013	Kuala Lumpur, KLFA Stadium	Chinese Taipei	3–0	6–1	2014 AFC U-19 Championship qualification
5.	3 October 2013	Kuala Lumpur, KLFA Stadium	Chinese Taipei	4–0	6–1	2014 AFC U-19 Championship qualification
6.	5 October 2013	Kuala Lumpur, KLFA Stadium	Hong Kong	1–0	5–1	2014 AFC U-19 Championship qualification
7.	5 October 2013	Kuala Lumpur, KLFA Stadium	Hong Kong	5–1	5–1	2014 AFC U-19 Championship qualification
8.	7 October 2013	Kuala Lumpur, KLFA Stadium	Australia	1–0	5–1	2014 AFC U-19 Championship qualification
9.	7 October 2013	Kuala Lumpur, KLFA Stadium	Australia	4–1	5–1	2014 AFC U-19 Championship qualification
10.	9 August 2014	Bandar Seri Begawan, Track & Field Sports Complex	Singapore	3–0	4–0	2014 Hassanal Bolkiah Trophy
11.	13 August 2014	Bandar Seri Begawan, Track & Field Sports Complex	Indonesia	3–0	4–0	2014 Hassanal Bolkiah Trophy
12.	23 August 2014	Bandar Seri Begawan, Track & Field Sports Complex	Myanmar	3–3	3–4	2014 Hassanal Bolkiah Trophy
13.	5 September 2014	Hà Nội, Mỹ Đình National Stadium	Australia	1–0	1–0	2014 AFF U-19 Youth Championship
14.	9 September 2014	Hà Nội, Mỹ Đình National Stadium	Japan	2–3	2–3	2014 AFF U-19 Youth Championship

==== U-22/U-23 ====
#	Date	Venue	Opponent	Score	Result	Competition
1.	27 March 2015	Malaysia, Shah Alam Stadium	Malaysia	2–1	2–1	2016 AFC U-23 Championship qualification
2.	31 March 2015	Malaysia, Shah Alam Stadium	Macau	3–0	7–0	2016 AFC U-23 Championship qualification
3.	31 March 2015	Malaysia, Shah Alam Stadium	Macau	6–0	7–0	2016 AFC U-23 Championship qualification
4.	31 March 2015	Malaysia, Shah Alam Stadium	Macau	7–0	7–0	2016 AFC U-23 Championship qualification
5.	29 May 2015	Bishan, Bishan Stadium	Brunei	5–0	6–0	2015 Southeast Asian Games
6.	2 June 2015	Bishan, Bishan Stadium	Malaysia	2–0	5–1	2015 Southeast Asian Games
7.	2 June 2015	Bishan, Bishan Stadium	Malaysia	4–0	5–1	2015 Southeast Asian Games
8.	20 January 2016	Doha, Grand Hamad Stadium	United Arab Emirates	1–0	2–3	2016 AFC U-23 Championship
9.	19 July 2017	Ho Chi Minh City, Thống Nhất Stadium	Timor-Leste	2–0	4–0	2018 AFC U-23 Championship qualification
10.	19 July 2017	Ho Chi Minh City, Thống Nhất Stadium	Timor-Leste	3–0	4–0	2018 AFC U-23 Championship qualification
11.	21 July 2017	Ho Chi Minh City, Thống Nhất Stadium	Macau	3–0	8–1	2018 AFC U-23 Championship qualification
12.	23 July 2017	Ho Chi Minh City, Thống Nhất Stadium	South Korea	1–1	1–2	2018 AFC U-23 Championship qualification
13.	15 August 2017	Selayang, MP Selayang Stadium	Timor-Leste	4–0	4–0	2017 Southeast Asian Games
14.	17 August 2017	Shah Alam, Shah Alam Stadium	Cambodia	1–0	4–1	2017 Southeast Asian Games
15.	17 August 2017	Shah Alam, Shah Alam Stadium	Cambodia	3–0	4–1	2017 Southeast Asian Games
16.	20 August 2017	Shah Alam, Shah Alam Stadium	Philippines	1–0	4–0	2017 Southeast Asian Games
17.	9 December 2017	Buriram, Thailand	Myanmar	4–0	4–0	2017 M-150 Cup
18.	15 December 2017	Buriram, Thailand	Thailand	1–0	2–1	2017 M-150 Cup
19.	15 December 2017	Buriram, Thailand	Thailand	2–0	2–1	2017 M-150 Cup
20.	20 January 2018	Changshu Stadium, Changshu, China	Iraq	1–0	3–3 (5–3 pen.)	2018 AFC U-23 Championship
21.	3 August 2018	Mỹ Đình National Stadium, Hà Nội, Vietnam	Palestine	2–1	2–1	Vinaphone Cup 2018
22.	14 August 2018	Cikarang, Indonesia	Pakistan	3–0	3–0	2018 Asian Games
23.	23 August 2018	Bekasi, West Java, Indonesia	Bahrain	1–0	1–0	2018 Asian Games

==== Vietnam ====
Scores and results list Vietnam's goal tally first.

#	Date	Venue	Opponent	Score	Result	Competition
1.	8 November 2016	Mỹ Đình National Stadium, Hanoi, Vietnam	Indonesia	2–2	3–2	Friendly
2.	22 March 2017	Hàng Đẫy Stadium, Hanoi, Vietnam	Chinese Taipei	1–1	1–1	Friendly
3.	10 October 2017	Mỹ Đình National Stadium, Hanoi, Vietnam	Cambodia	4–0	5–0	2019 AFC Asian Cup qualification
4.	8 November 2018	New Laos National Stadium, Vientiane, Laos	Laos	1–0	3–0	2018 AFF Championship
5.	16 November 2018	Mỹ Đình National Stadium, Hanoi, Vietnam	Malaysia	1–0	2–0	2018 AFF Championship
6.	6 December 2018	Mỹ Đình National Stadium, Hanoi, Vietnam	Philippines	2–0	2–1	2018 AFF Championship
7.	8 January 2019	Zayed Sports City Stadium, Abu Dhabi, United Arab Emirates	Iraq	2–1	2–3	2019 AFC Asian Cup
8.	20 January 2019	Al Maktoum Stadium, Dubai, United Arab Emirates	Jordan	1–1	1–1 (4–2 pen.)	2019 AFC Asian Cup
9.	7 June 2021	Al Maktoum Stadium, Dubai, United Arab Emirates	Indonesia	3–0	4–0	2022 FIFA World Cup qualification
10.	6 December 2021	Bishan Stadium, Bishan, Singapore	Laos	1–0	2–0	2020 AFF Championship
11.	12 December 2021	Bishan Stadium, Bishan, Singapore	Malaysia	2–0	3–0	2020 AFF Championship
12.	11 September 2023	Thiên Trường Stadium, Nam Định, Vietnam	Palestine	1–0	2–0	Friendly

== Personal life ==
Công Phượng is the cousin of Nguyễn Thái Quốc Cường, who is also a professional footballer and currently plays for V.League 1 side Ho Chi Minh City.

He officially got married on 6 June 2020.

=== Age fabrication accusation ===
The rumours that Công Phượng had fabricated his age to play in younger age football competition began to circulate soon after his team won the 2014 International U-21 Thanh Niên Newspaper Cup. It started with the newspaper Thể Thao 24h published on 8 November 2014, three different documents showing three different date of birth of Công Phượng and an interview with a former Hoàng Anh Gia Lai F.C. youth team's player Bùi Văn Phúc said that both him and Công Phượng had their birth certificate redone, in his case it changed 1994 to 1996 and Công Phượng from 1993 to 1995. Bùi Văn Phúc later denied the newspaper's claim but the newspaper affirmed they told the truth and have recording of the conversation that they were willing to show if necessary.

On 12 November, after two days working in Nghệ An Province, Vietnam Football Federation published Công Phượng's birth certificate that showed he was born on 21 January 1995. On 16 November 2014, VTV Chuyển Động 24h broadcast a program pointing out problems with the birth certificate, the program also published more documents to back up the claim that Công Phượng born in 1993 and asked Công Phượng to speak up. On 17 November, in an interview with Người Lao Động newspaper, Công Phượng made no comment when asked about the accusation he said that he doesn't have permission from the club to answer.

On 18 November, after investigating the matter, Đô Lương District's Justice Committee Division concluded that Công Phượng was born on 21 January 1995. Nghệ An Province's Justice Department reached the same conclusion on 5 December.

On 30 December, VTV was fined 15 million Vietnamese Dong and ordered to issue a public correction by the Ministry of Information and Communications for broadcasting wrongful information about Công Phượng's age, the newspaper Thể Thao 24h was also fined 10 million Vietnamese Dong and ordered to issue a public correction.

== Honours ==
Trường Tươi Đồng Nai

- V.League 2: 2025–26

Vietnam

- AFF Championship: 2018
- VFF Cup: 2022
- King’s Cup: runner-up 2019

Vietnam U23

- VFF Cup: 2018
- SEA Games: third place 2015
- AFC U-23 Championship: runner-up 2018

Individual

- Vietnamese Young Player of the Year: 2015
- Vietnamese Most favorite player: 2017, 2018
- V.League 1 Team of the Season: 2018, 2020
- V.League 2 Team of the Season: 2024–25
