= Lương Xuân Trường =

Vietnamese footballer (born 1995)

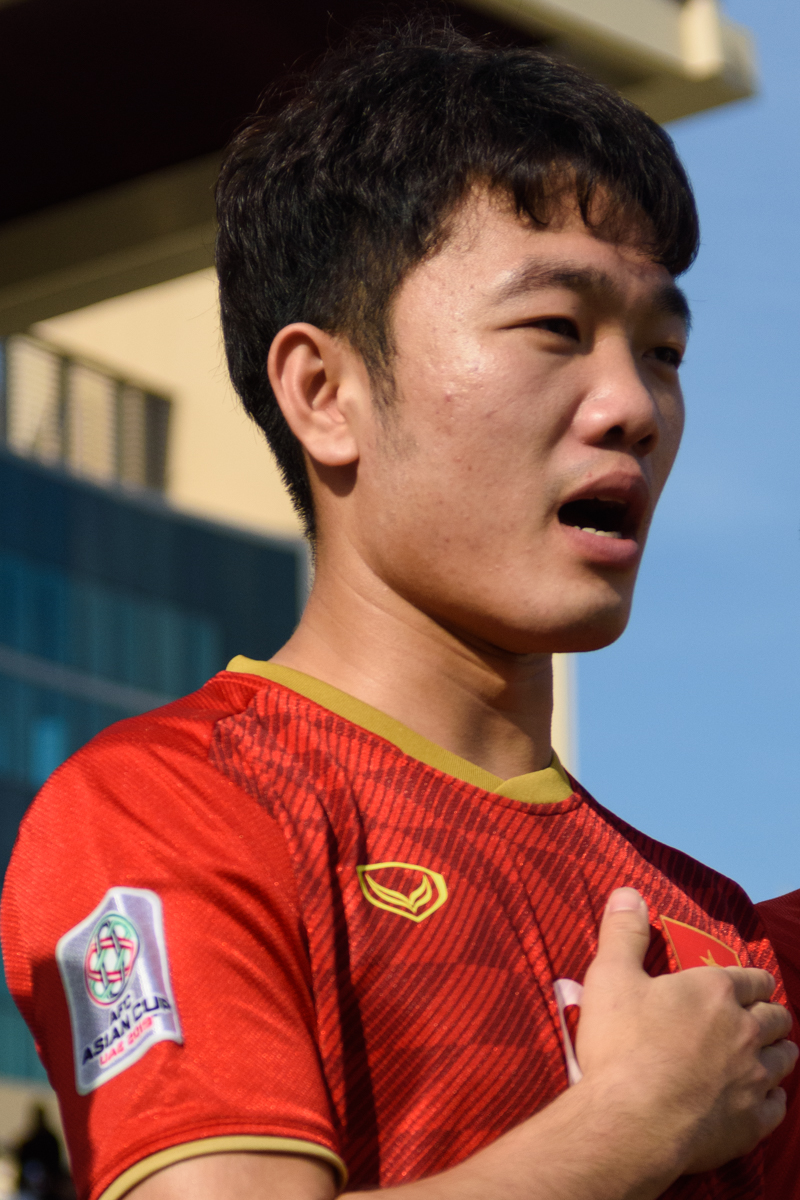
- Xuân Trường with Vietnam at the 2019 AFC Asian Cup

Personal information
- Full name: Lương Xuân Trường
- Date of birth: 28 April 1995 (age 31)
- Place of birth: Tuyên Quang, Vietnam
- Height: 1.78 m (5 ft 10 in)
- Position: Defensive midfielder

Team information
- Current team: Đồng Nai City
- Number: 6

Youth career
- 2007–2014: Hoàng Anh Gia Lai

Senior career*
Years	Team	Apps	(Gls)
2015–2022	Hoàng Anh Gia Lai	94	(9)
2016	→ Incheon United (loan)	4	(0)
2017	→ Gangwon FC (loan)	2	(0)
2019	→ Buriram United (loan)	6	(1)
2022–2024	Hải Phòng	17	(0)
2024	→ Hồng Lĩnh Hà Tĩnh (loan)	14	(0)
2024–2025	Hồng Lĩnh Hà Tĩnh	24	(0)
2025–	Đồng Nai City	27	(1)

International career^{‡}
2013–2014	Vietnam U19	27	(2)
2015–2018	Vietnam U23	29	(3)
2016–2022	Vietnam	41	(1)
Medal record
Men's football
Representing Vietnam
AFF U-19 Youth Championship
Runner-up	Indonesia 2013
Runner-up	Vietnam 2014
AFC U-23 Championship
Runner-up	China 2018
AFF Championship
Winner	ASEAN 2018
- * Club domestic league appearances and goals as of 21 November 2026 ‡ National team caps and goals as of 12 December 2021

Lương Xuân Trường (Note: In this Vietnamese name, the surname is Lương, but is often simplified to Luong in English-language text. In accordance with Vietnamese custom, this person should be referred to by the given name, Xuân Trường.) (born 28 April 1995) is a Vietnamese professional footballer who plays as a defensive midfielder for V.League 1 club Đồng Nai City.

Xuân Trường is a product of HAGL – Arsenal JMG Academy and was promoted to Hoàng Anh Gia Lai first team in 2015, he was also given the captain arm band. Xuân Trường is praised for his vision, passing and free-kick ability.

== Early career ==
Lương Xuân Trường was born on 28 April 1995 in Tuyên Quang in a family of 2 children, Lương Xuân Trường is the second child, above him is an older sister. His father Lương Bách Chiến who works in Tuyên Quang Power Company is a former amateur footballer in the army team, he's also the manager of Tuyên Quang Power Company's male football team. Xuân Trường started play football around the age of 5, trained by his father. He represented Tuyên Quang Province at several youth football competitions.

In 2007, when playing for Tuyên Quang U-13 team at a youth football competition in Hanoi, Xuân Trường's team happened to be at the same hotel with HAGL – Arsenal JMG Academy's coaches who were there searching for candidates for the academy. Xuân Trường decided to take the trial and he got accepted into the academy.

In November 2012, Xuân Trường along with Nguyễn Công Phượng, Nguyễn Tuấn Anh, Trần Hữu Đông Triều were four of the players from the academy received the invitation to train with Arsenal U-17 team. In the letter, Arsenal's performance supervisor, Steve Morrow stated that coach Arsène Wenger was impressed with the academy's players when they beat Arsenal U-17 team in January.

== Club career ==
=== Hoàng Anh Gia Lai ===
Xuân Trường was promoted to Hoàng Anh Gia Lai first team along with other academy's player from the first selection in 2015 when the club revolutionized their first team, most of their first team players were released, only a few was kept to guide young player from the academy. Xuân Trường was promoted to first team along with other academy's player from the first selection, he was also given the captain arm band.

Xuân Trường made his V.League 1 debut on 4 January 2015 at the opening game of the season against Sanna Khanh Hoa. He score his first league goal in this game as Hoàng Anh Gia Lai won the game 4–2. In February, Xuân Trường suffered an injury in the seventh-round game against XSKT Can Tho which kept him out for 4 months, he made his come back on June in the thirteenth-round game against Becamex Binh Duong

=== Incheon United ===
On 28 December 2015, Xuân Trường joined Incheon United on 2 years loan deal with the alleged transfer fee of US$300,000. He became the first Vietnamese player to play in K League. He made his debut game on 23 May 2016 versus Gwangju FC, he was named in the starting eleven of Incheon United, played 60 minutes and was replaced. After that Incheon United lost by 1 goal to nil.

=== Gangwon FC ===
On 21 December 2016, Xuân Trường moved from Incheon United to Gangwon FC on a year loan deal.

=== Buriram United ===
On 8 February 2019, Xuân Trường moved from Hoàng Anh Gia Lai to Buriram United on 1-year loan deal. On 9 April 2019, Xuân Trường made his first assist for Buriram almost immediately after being substituted in an AFC Champions League game against Beijing Sinobo Guoan F.C. On 11 May 2019, he scored his first goal for Buriram United with a free kick in Toyota Thai League 2019 9-round match against Nakhon Ratchasima. then he joined the Vietnamese national football team.

=== Hải Phòng ===
On 3 January 2023, Hải Phòng completed the signing of Xuân Trường on a free transfer. He penned a two-year contract. Upon joining the club, Trường was given the number 8 shirt.

=== Hồng Lĩnh Hà Tĩnh ===
On 1 March 2024, in search for game time, Xuân Trường joined V.League 1 fellow Hồng Lĩnh Hà Tĩnh on loan. Ahead of the 2024–25 season, his transfer to the club was made permanent.

=== Trường Tươi Đồng Nai ===
In July 2025, Xuân Trường moved to V.League 2 side Trường Tươi Đồng Nai.

== International career ==
=== Youth ===
Lương Xuân Trường began his international career for Vietnam with the national youth football team and earned caps at under-19 and under-23 levels. He was named captain of the under-19 team at the 2013 AFF U-19 Youth Championship. Under Trường's leadership, the team recorded impressive victories to advance to the final of the tournament. However, he missed out on the final due to injury as his team lost to the host Indonesia U19 in the penalty shootout.

Xuân Trường represented U-19 team in all of their competitions throughout 2013 to 2014 such as: 2014 AFC U-19 Championship qualification where his team came out as Group F winner after they shockingly beat Australia U-19 (5-1), 2014 AFF U-19 Youth Championship where they finished second, and 2014 AFC U-19 Championship.

In February 2015, Xuân Trường was called up to Vietnam U-23 training camp for 2016 AFC U-23 Championship qualification but he was returned to his club later as the injury he suffered prior the training camp was much more serious than expected.

=== Senior ===
On 24 March 2016, Lương Xuân Trường made his debut for the Vietnam senior team in a 2018 World Cup qualifier against Chinese Taipei. He played the full 90 minutes in a 4–1 win. He scored his first international goal in a friendly against North Korea on 6 October 2016.

On 13 November 2016, Xuân Trường was named in Vietnam's squad for the 2016 AFF Championship. On 20 November, he started as a central midfielder in the team's first AFF Championship fixture ~ a 2–1 victory over Myanmar. Vietnam were eliminated in the semi-finals of the competition following an aggregate score of 4–3 defeat to Indonesia.

== Career statistics ==
=== Club ===
As of match played 21 November 2026

Appearances and goals by club, season and competition
Club	Season	League			National cup (Note: Includes Vietnamese Cup, Korean FA Cup and Thai FA Cup)		Asia		Other		Total	
Club	Season	Division	Apps	Goals	Apps	Goals	Apps	Goals	Apps	Goals	Apps	Goals
Hoàng Anh Gia Lai	2015	V.League 1	18	1	0	0	—		—		18	1
Hoàng Anh Gia Lai	2018	V.League 1	22	4	4	2	—		—		26	6
Hoàng Anh Gia Lai	2019	V.League 1	11	2	—		—		—		11	2
Hoàng Anh Gia Lai	2020	V.League 1	14	0	0	0	—		—		14	0
Hoàng Anh Gia Lai	2021	V.League 1	11	1	0	0	—		—		11	1
Hoàng Anh Gia Lai	2022	V.League 1	18	1	2	0	6 (Note: Appearances in AFC Champions League)	0	—		26	1
Hoàng Anh Gia Lai	Total		94	9	6	2	6	0	0	0	106	11
Incheon United (loan)	2016	K League 1	4	0	0	0	—		—		4	0
Gangwon (loan)	2017	K League 1	2	0	1	0	—		—		3	0
Buriram United (loan)	2019	Thai League 1	6	1	0	0	3	0	1 (Note: Appearance in Thai League Cup)	0	10	1
Hải Phòng	2023	V.League 1	11	0	1	0	—		—		12	0
Hải Phòng	2023–24	V.League 1	6	0	0	0	6 (Note: Two appearances in AFC Champions League, four appearances in AFC Cup)	0	—		12	0
Hải Phòng	Total		17	0	1	0	6	0	0	0	24	0
Hồng Lĩnh Hà Tĩnh	2023–24	V.League 1	14	0	1	0	—		1 (Note: Appearance in V.League 1 relegation/promotion play-offs)	0	16	0
Hồng Lĩnh Hà Tĩnh	2024–25	V.League 1	24	0	1	0	—		—		25	0
Hồng Lĩnh Hà Tĩnh	Total		38	0	2	0	0	0	1	0	41	0
Đồng Nai City	2025–26	V.League 2	21	1	2	0	—		—		23	1
Đồng Nai City	2026–27	V.League 1	6	0	1	0	—		—		7	0
Đồng Nai City	Total		27	1	3	0	0	0	1	0	30	1
Career total			188	11	13	2	15	0	2	0	218	13

=== International ===
As of match played 27 January 2022

Appearances and goals by national team and year
National team	Year	Apps	Goals
Vietnam	2016	11	1
Vietnam	2017	5	0
Vietnam	2018	7	0
Vietnam	2019	6	0
Vietnam	2021	11	0
Vietnam	2022	1	0
Total		41	1

Vietnam score listed first, score column indicates score after each Trường goal.

List of international goals scored by Lương Xuân Trường
No.	Date	Venue	Cap	Opponent	Score	Result	Competition
1	6 October 2016	Thống Nhất Stadium, Ho Chi Minh City, Vietnam	6	North Korea	4–2	5–2	Friendly

== Honours ==
Trường Tươi Đồng Nai

- V.League 2: 2025–26

Vietnam

- AFF Championship: 2018
- VFF Cup: 2022

Vietnam U23

- VFF Cup: 2018

Individual

- Vietnamese Silver Ball: 2016
- Thai League Goal of the Month: May 2019
- Most favorite players: 2016
