= Lê Đức Lương =

Vietnamese footballer (born 1994)

Personal information
- Full name: Lê Đức Lương
- Date of birth: 18 August 1994 (age 32)
- Place of birth: Tân Uyên, Bình Dương, Vietnam
- Height: 1.68 m (5 ft 6 in)
- Position: Left-back

Youth career
- 2007–2012: HAGL – Arsenal JMG Academy

Senior career*
Years	Team	Apps	(Gls)
2013–2022	Hoàng Anh Gia Lai	67	(2)
2020	→ Hồ Chí Minh City (loan)	3	(0)
2022	→ Công An Nhân Dân (loan)	7	(1)
2023	Phù Đổng	9	(0)
Total		86	(3)

International career
2015–2016	Vietnam U23	2	(0)
- * Club domestic league appearances and goals

Lê Đức Lương (born 18 August 1994) is a Vietnamese former professional footballer who played as a left-back.

== Honours ==
Hồ Chí Minh City

- Vietnamese Super Cup: Runner-up: 2020

Công An Nhân Dân

- V.League 2: 2022
