= Môi Sê =

Vietnamese footballer (born 2005)

Personal information
- Full name: Môi Sê
- Date of birth: 20 October 2005 (age 21)
- Place of birth: Đắk Đoa, Gia Lai, Vietnam
- Height: 1.69 m (5 ft 7 in)
- Position: Midfielder

Team information
- Current team: Hoàng Anh Gia Lai
- Number: 26

Youth career
- 2019–2025: Hoàng Anh Gia Lai

Senior career*
Years	Team	Apps	(Gls)
2022–2024	→ Kon Tum (loan)		
2024–2025	→ Long An (loan)	4	(0)
2025–	Hoàng Anh Gia Lai	10	(0)
- * Club domestic league appearances and goals as of 13 September 2026

Môi Sê (born 20 October 2005) is a Vietnamese professional footballer who plays as a midfielder for V.League 1 club Hoàng Anh Gia Lai.

== Early career ==
Môi Sê joined the Hoàng Anh Gia Lai Academy at the age of 14. In 2023, he was named in the Best XI in the Vietnamese National U-19 Championship.

== Club career ==
In 2022, he made his senior debut for Kon Tum at the Vietnamese Third Division.

Ahead of the 2024–25 season, Môi Sê was loaned to V.League 2 club Long An. In February 2025, Môi Sê was promoted to Hoàng Anh Gia Lai's first team, playing in the V.League 1.

== Personal life ==
Môi Sê is an ethnic Bahnar from Đak Đoa, Gia Lai. He was named after Hebrew prophet Moses.
