= Bùi Văn Long =

Vietnamese footballer (born 1988)

Personal information
- Full name: Bùi Văn Long
- Date of birth: 10 October 1988 (age 38)
- Place of birth: Lương Sơn, Hòa Bình, Vietnam
- Height: 1.72 m (5 ft 8 in)
- Position: Right-back

Youth career
- 2001–2008: HAGL – Arsenal JMG Academy

Senior career*
| Years | Team | Apps | (Gls) |
| 2009–2016 | Hoàng Anh Gia Lai | 77 | (1) |
| 2016–2018 | SHB Đà Nẵng | 31 | (1) |
| 2019–2020 | Thanh Hóa | 5 | (0) |
| 2021–2022 | Phố Hiến | 7 | (0) |

International career^{‡}
| 2014–2015 | Vietnam | 2 | (0) |
- * Club domestic league appearances and goals as of 20 April 2019 ‡ National team caps and goals as of 6 September 2014

Bùi Văn Long (born 10 October 1988) is a Vietnamese footballer who plays as a right-back for V.League 2 club Phố Hiến.

Despite being handed the captaincy for most of the 2016 season and having more than a year left on his contract, in October 2016 Văn Long announced he would be leaving Hoàng Anh Gia Lai F.C. to play for SHB Đà Nẵng.
