= Võ Út Cường =

Vietnamese footballer

Personal information
- Full name: Võ Út Cường
- Date of birth: June 12, 1990 (age 36)
- Place of birth: Cái Răng, Cần Thơ, Vietnam
- Height: 1.78 m (5 ft 10 in)
- Position: Midfielder

Youth career
- 2003–2007: Ninh Thuận
- 2007–2012: HAGL – Arsenal JMG Academy

Senior career*
Years	Team	Apps	(Gls)
2012–2016	Hoàng Anh Gia Lai	28	(1)
2012	→ Ninh Thuận (loan)	?	(0)
2016–2018	Sanna Khánh Hòa BVN	21	(2)
2018–2020	XSKT Cần Thơ	21	(1)
2021–2023	Khánh Hòa	24	(1)
- * Club domestic league appearances and goals as of 2 October 2018

Võ Út Cường (born 12 June 1990) is a Vietnamese footballer who plays as a midfielder for V.League 1 club Khánh Hòa.

== Honours ==
Khanh Hoa FC

- V.League 2 runner-up: 2022
