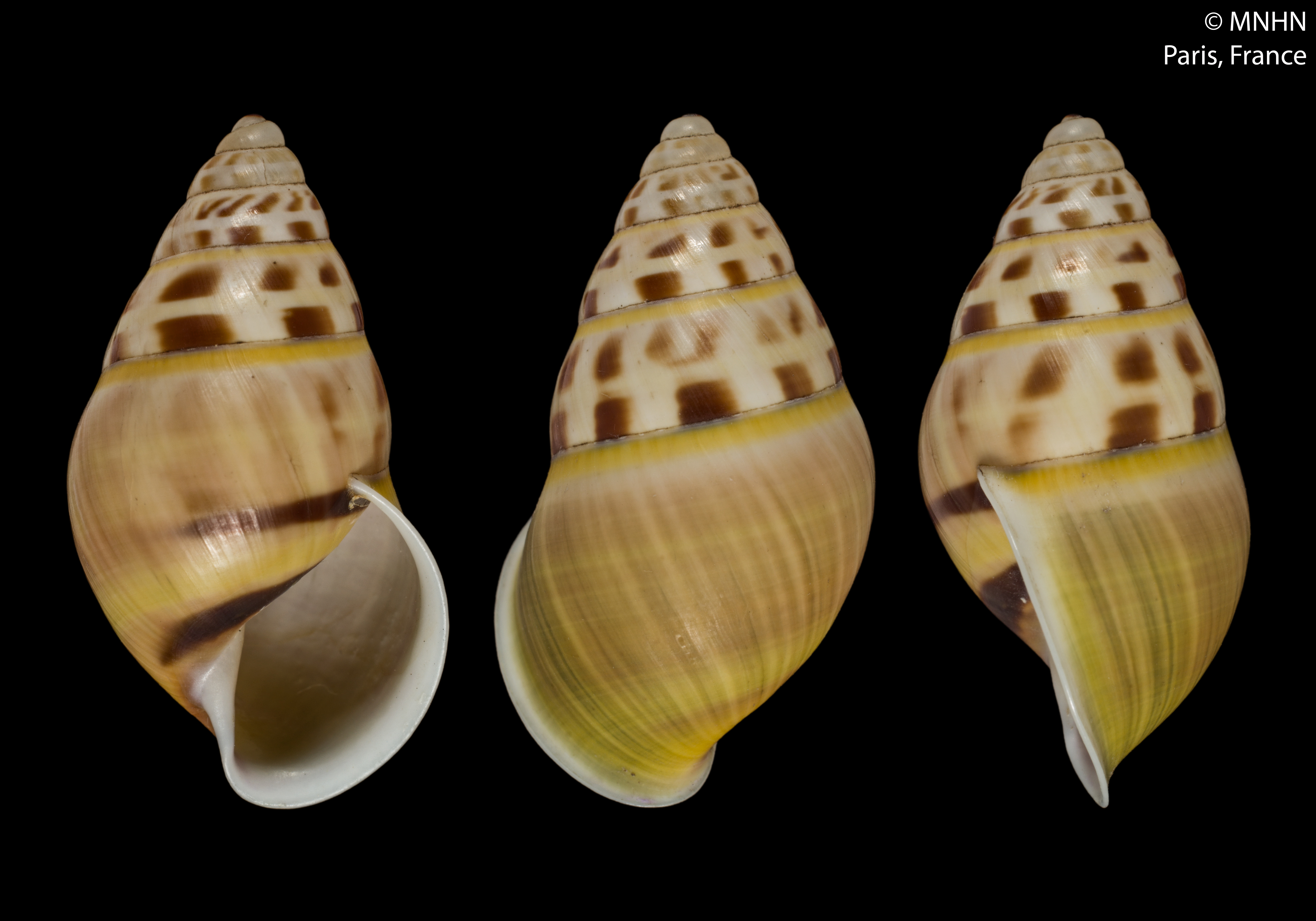
- Shell of Amphidromus liei joshuathami (holotype at MNHN, Paris)

Scientific classification
- Kingdom: Animalia
- Phylum: Mollusca
- Class: Gastropoda
- Order: Stylommatophora
- Family: Camaenidae
- Genus: Amphidromus
- Species: A. liei

Binomial name
- Amphidromus liei Thach, 2017

= Amphidromus liei =

Species of snail in the family Camaenidae

Amphidromus liei is a species of medium-sized air-breathing tree snail, an arboreal gastropod mollusk in the family Camaenidae.

Subspecies
Amphidromus liei joshuathami Thach, 2018

== Habitat ==
This species lives in trees.

== Distribution ==
The type locality of this species is Đắk Đoa district, Gia Lai Province; Vietnam.
