= Hoang Anh Gia Lai Academy =

Coordinates: 13.8629°N 108.0007°E

Hoàng Anh Gia Lai Academy
- Short name: HAGL Academy
- Founded: 2007; 19 years ago
- Ground: Ham Rong Football Training Center
- Owner: Hoang Anh Gia Lai Group
- Chairman: Đoàn Nguyên Đức
| Home colours | Away colours | Third colours |

Hoang Anh Gia Lai Academy (Vietnamese: Trung tâm đào tạo bóng đá trẻ Hoàng Anh Gia Lai) is the youth section of V.League 1 side Hoàng Anh Gia Lai. Based in Pleiku, Gia Lai Province. The academy was a built as co-operation between Arsenal Football Club, JMG Academy and the Vietnamese privately owned Hoang Anh Gia Lai Corporation before the partnership ended completely in 2021.

== History ==
In 2007, V.League 1 club Hoang Anh Gia Lai (HAGL) succeeded in signing an agreement with the English football club Arsenal and the French JMG Academy, founding the HAGL Academy – Arsenal JMG in Pleiku. Despite football being the number one sport in Vietnam, the country had few successes in regional football tournaments, by with only one AFF Championship title in 2008, as Thailand was still the dominating team in the region. The causes of low success rate of Vietnam's football team were caused by the lack of systematic training, which lead HAGL owner Đoàn Nguyên Đức to open the academy in order to improve Vietnamese football talents. In August 2009, two players from the academy were sent to train with the Arsenal first team.

Following JMG's curriculum, young players were trained from an early age to develop their ball controlling skills and to adopt a modern playing style. The academy placed the technical criteria as the priority while selecting players during youth trials. Coached by French manager Guillaume Graechen, the first generation of the HAGL Academy quickly enjoyed early success in 2013, as their players attracted media attention with good performances at youth tournaments. The number of HAGL players in Vietnamese national teams outnumbers other teams. Players such as Nguyễn Công Phượng, Nguyễn Tuấn Anh, Lương Xuân Trường, Nguyễn Văn Toàn and Vũ Văn Thanh rose to fame and were considered as prospects of Vietnamese football. However as HAGL players integrate the professional football environment, many of them often find it difficult to stay in the top level due to their limitations in physical level and strength. This is due to JMG's curriculum not focusing on improving body shape and physical strength, while that is still a weakness of Vietnamese players.

From 30 June 2017, the entire cooperation between Arsenal and Hoang Anh Gia Lai ends. HAGL Academy – Arsenal JMG also changed its name to HAGL-JMG Academy.

From mid-June 2021, HAGL decided to cease cooperating with JMG's standard training model, transferring all its 2001 to 2003 born players to the NutiFood JMG Academy, thus changing its name to the current HAGL Academy.

== Honours ==
=== National competitions ===
- Vietnam National U-21 Championship

(gold) Winners : 2017, 2024
(silver) Runners-up : 2006
(bronze) Third place : 2010, 2016, 2018, 2021

- Vietnam National U-19 Championship

(silver) Runners-up : 2009, 2019, 2020
(bronze) Third place : 2014, 2024

- Vietnam National U-17 Championship

(silver) Runners-up : 2011, 2024
(bronze) Third place : 2012, 2017, 2019, 2020

- Vietnam National U-15 Championship

(gold) Winners : 2016
(bronze) Third place : 2010, 2022, 2023

== Notable players ==
The players in bold have capped for the Vietnam national team:

- (Vietnam) **A Hoàng**
- (Vietnam) Bùi Trần Vũ
- (Vietnam) **Bùi Văn Long**
- (Vietnam) **Châu Ngọc Quang**
- (Vietnam) **Đặng Văn Lâm**
- (Vietnam) **Đinh Quang Kiệt**
- (Vietnam) **Đinh Thanh Bình**
- (Vietnam) Dụng Quang Nho
- (Vietnam) Hoàng Minh Tiến
- (Vietnam) Hoàng Thanh Tùng
- (Vietnam) **Hoàng Vĩnh Nguyên**
- (Vietnam) Khuất Hữu Long
- (Vietnam) Lê Đức Lương
- (Vietnam) Lê Duy Thanh
- (Vietnam) **Lê Hoàng Thiên**
- (Vietnam) Lê Minh Bình
- (Vietnam) **Lê Phạm Thành Long**
- (Vietnam) **Lê Văn Sơn**
- (Vietnam) Lê Văn Trường
- (Vietnam) Lương Hoàng Nam
- (Vietnam) **Lương Xuân Trường**
- (Vietnam) Môi Sê
- (Vietnam) **Nguyễn Công Phượng**
- (Vietnam) Nguyễn Đức Việt
- (Vietnam) Nguyễn Hữu Anh Tài
- (Vietnam) Nguyễn Minh Tâm
- (Vietnam) **Nguyễn Nhật Minh**
- (Vietnam) **Nguyễn Phong Hồng Duy**
- (Vietnam) Nguyễn Quốc Việt
- (Vietnam) **Nguyễn Thái Quốc Cường**
- (Vietnam) Nguyễn Thanh Khôi
- (Vietnam) **Nguyễn Thanh Nhân**
- (Vietnam) **Nguyễn Tuấn Anh**
- (Vietnam) **Nguyễn Tuấn Mạnh**
- (Vietnam) **Nguyễn Văn Toàn**
- (Vietnam) Nguyễn Văn Triệu
- (Vietnam) **Phạm Lý Đức**
- (Vietnam) Phạm Văn Tiến
- (Vietnam) Phan Du Học
- (Vietnam) Phan Thanh Hậu
- (Vietnam) Trần Bảo Toàn
- (Vietnam) Trần Gia Bảo
- (Vietnam) Trần Gia Huy
- (Vietnam) Trần Hữu Đông Triều
- (Vietnam) **Trần Minh Vương**
- (Vietnam) Trần Thanh Sơn
- (Vietnam) **Trần Trung Kiên**
- (Vietnam) **Triệu Việt Hưng**
- (Vietnam) Võ Út Cường
- (Vietnam) **Vũ Văn Thanh**
- (Vietnam) Y Êli Niê
