= Bùi Trần Vũ =

Vietnamese footballer (born 1989)

Personal information
- Full name: Bùi Trần Vũ
- Date of birth: 10 October 1989 (age 37)
- Place of birth: Phan Rang, Ninh Thuận, Vietnam
- Height: 1.67 m (5 ft 6 in)
- Position: Midfielder

Team information
- Current team: LPBank Ho Chi Minh City
- Number: 21

Youth career
- 2003–2007: Ninh Thuận
- 2007–2011: HAGL – Arsenal JMG Academy

Senior career*
Years	Team	Apps	(Gls)
2012–2016	Hoàng Anh Gia Lai	80	(4)
2012	→ Ninh Thuận (loan)	?	(0)
2012–2013	→ Hoang Anh Attapeu (loan)		
2017–2020	Sài Gòn	42	(4)
2021–2023	Bình Phước	34	(2)
2024	LPBank Ho Chi Minh City		
- * Club domestic league appearances and goals as of 22 June 2018

Bùi Trần Vũ (born 10 October 1989) is a Vietnamese footballer who is playing for LPBank Ho Chi Minh City.

== Club career ==
In 2012, Trần Vũ was loaned to Hoàng Anh Gia Lai's partner club in Laos Hoang Anh Attapeu, where he remained for one season.

Following the 2016 season, Trần Vũ joined Sài Gòn on a 2-year deal.
