= Hoàng Vĩnh Nguyên =

Vietnamese footballer (born 2002)

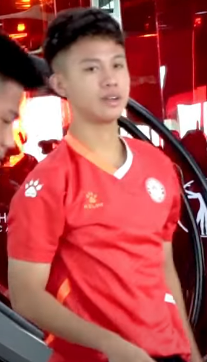
- Vĩnh Nguyên in 2023

Personal information
- Full name: Hoàng Vĩnh Nguyên
- Date of birth: February 3, 2002 (age 24)
- Place of birth: Hà Tĩnh, Vietnam
- Height: 1.70 m (5 ft 7 in)
- Position: Midfielder

Team information
- Current team: Hoàng Anh Gia Lai
- Number: 23

Youth career
- 2013–2020: Hoang Anh Gia Lai
- 2020–2022: Nutifood

Senior career*
Years	Team	Apps	(Gls)
2021–2022	Nutifood	0	(0)
2021–2022	→ Long An (loan)	27	(1)
2023–2025	Hồ Chí Minh City	36	(0)
2023	→ Cádiz Mirandilla (loan)	0	(0)
2025–	Hoàng Anh Gia Lai	33	(0)

International career^{‡}
2023–2024	Vietnam U23	3	(0)
2026–	Vietnam	2	(0)
- * Club domestic league appearances and goals as of 20 November 2026 ‡ National team caps and goals as of 17 November 2026

Hoàng Vĩnh Nguyên (born 3 February 2002) is a Vietnamese professional footballer who plays as a midfielder for V.League 1 club Hoàng Anh Gia Lai and the Vietnam national team.

== Early career ==
At the age of 11, Vĩnh Nguyên joined the Hoang Anh Gia Lai – Arsenal JMG Academy after displaying good set of skills the during the academy's admission test. In 2019, he was sent to train with the under-17 side of Feyenoord during a short period.

In 2020, Vĩnh Nguyên joined the Nutifood JMG Academy, a partner club of Hoàng Anh Gia Lai. He was part of the U-21 Nutifood squad that won the 2021 Vietnamese National U-21 Championship.

== Club career ==
In 2021, Vĩnh Nguyên joined V.League 2 side Long An on a long-term loan deal from Nutifood.

In January 2023, Vĩnh Nguyên joined V.League 1 team Hồ Chí Minh City on a permanent transfer.

On 26 September 2023, Vĩnh Nguyên joined Cádiz Mirandilla on short-term loan deal.

On 29 July 2025, Vĩnh Nguyên returned to his boyhood Hoàng Anh Gia Lai.

== International career ==
In March 2023, Vĩnh Nguyên received his first call-up to the Vietnam U23 team for the Doha Cup friendly tournament. He made one appearance during the tournament against Kyrgyzstan U23.
