= Phan Du Học =

Vietnamese footballer

Personal information
- Full name: Phan Du Học
- Date of birth: 1 November 2001 (age 24)
- Place of birth: Bình Thuận, Vietnam
- Height: 1.72 m (5 ft 8 in)
- Position: Left-back

Team information
- Current team: Hoàng Anh Gia Lai
- Number: 66

Youth career
- 2014–2019: Hoàng Anh Gia Lai

Senior career*
Years	Team	Apps	(Gls)
2019–	Hoàng Anh Gia Lai	55	(0)
2019	→ Long An (loan)	2	(0)
2020–2022	→ Công An Nhân Dân (loan)	21	(1)
2023	→ Phù Đổng (loan)	10	(0)

International career
2019	Vietnam U19	1	(0)
- * Club domestic league appearances and goals as of 7 June 2026

Phan Du Học (born 1 November 2001) is a Vietnamese professional footballer who plays as a left-back for V.League 1 club Hoàng Anh Gia Lai.

== Club career ==
Born in Bình Thuận, Du Học was a youth product of the Hoàng Anh Gia Lai Academy. He was loaned to V.League 2 club Long An in March 2019 and made his professional debut there.

In 2020, Du Học joined Công An Nhân Dân on loan, and remained in the club during three seasons, contributing to their climbing from the Vietnamese Second Division to V.League 1.

Du Học returned to Hoàng Anh Gia Lai in the 2023–24 season, after another loan spell at Phù Đổng. He became an important starter for the club in the 2024–25 season and was named as the team's vice-captain.

== International career ==
In August 2025, Du Học received his first call up to the Vietnam national team for an internal training camp.

== Honours ==
Công An Nhân Dân

- V.League 2: 2022
