= Nguyễn Văn Triệu =

Vietnamese footballer (born 2003)

Personal information
- Full name: Nguyễn Văn Triệu
- Date of birth: January 17, 2003 (age 23)
- Place of birth: Phan Thiết, Bình Thuận, Vietnam
- Height: 1.90 m (6 ft 3 in)
- Position: Centre back

Team information
- Current team: Hoàng Anh Gia Lai
- Number: 15

Youth career
- 2015–2018: Bình Thuận
- 2018–2022: Hoàng Anh Gia Lai

Senior career*
Years	Team	Apps	(Gls)
2022–	Hoàng Anh Gia Lai	52	(0)
Medal record
Men's football
Representing Vietnam
AFF U-19 Youth Championship
Third place	Indonesia 2022	Team
- * Club domestic league appearances and goals as of 7 June 2026 ‡ National team caps and goals as of 1 August 2023

Nguyễn Văn Triệu (born 17 January 2003) is a Vietnamese professional footballer who plays as a centre back for V.League 1 club Hoàng Anh Gia Lai.

== Club career ==
Born in Bình Thuận, Văn Triệu played for the youth team of Bình Thuận FC before joining the Hoàng Anh Gia Lai – Arsenal JMG Academy in 2018. Văn Triệu was to the first team of Hoàng Anh Gia Lai for the 2022 V.League 1 season. He made his professional debut on 18 October 2022, entering the field as substitute player in the 86th minute in Hoang Anh Gia Lai's 0–2 V.League 1 defeat against Viettel.

== International career ==
Văn Triệu was included in Vietnam U19 squad for the 2022 AFF U-19 Youth Championship, but he didn't make any appearance due to an injury. Vietnam U19 finished the tournament in the third place.

== Honours ==
Vietnam U19

- AFF U-19 Youth Championship: Third place: 2022
