= A Hoàng =

Vietnamese footballer (born 1995)

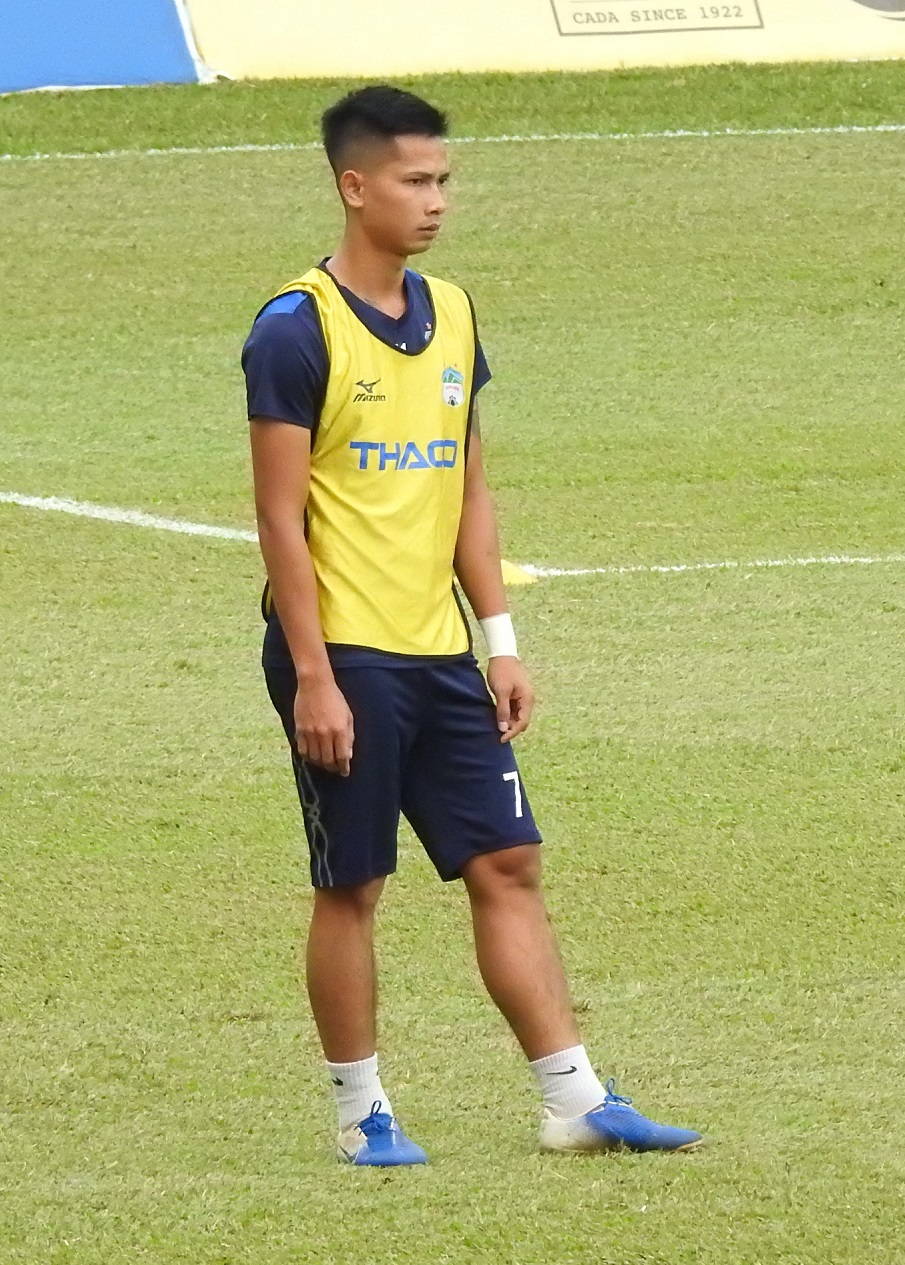
- A Hoàng in 2020

Personal information
- Full name: A Hoàng
- Date of birth: 31 July 1995 (age 31)
- Place of birth: Đắk Glei, Kon Tum, Vietnam
- Height: 1.73 m (5 ft 8 in)
- Position: Centre-back

Team information
- Current team: Hoàng Anh Gia Lai
- Number: 4

Youth career
- 2007–2014: HAGL – Arsenal JMG Academy

Senior career*
Years	Team	Apps	(Gls)
2016–	Hoàng Anh Gia Lai	96	(5)
2021	→ SHB Đà Nẵng (loan)	3	(0)

International career^{‡}
2016–2017	Vietnam U23	6	(0)
2017–2018	Vietnam	2	(0)
- * Club domestic league appearances and goals as of 31 May 2023 ‡ National team caps and goals as of 22 March 2017

A Hoàng (born 31 July 1995) is a Vietnamese footballer who plays as a centre-back for V.League 1 club Hoàng Anh Gia Lai.

A Hoàng came through the youth system at Hoang Anh Gia Lai before graduating to the first team in 2016. He has had loan spells at Phu Yen and SHB Da Nang.

A Hoàng made his senior international debut for the Vietnam in March 2017.

== International career ==
A Hoàng was first called up to the Vietnam national team on 10 March 2017 for their 2019 AFC Asian Cup qualification match against Afghanistan on 28 March.

== Personal life ==
A Hoàng is an ethnic Giẻ Triêng from Kon Tum.
