= Nguyễn Hữu Anh Tài =

Vietnamese footballer

Personal information
- Full name: Nguyễn Hữu Anh Tài
- Date of birth: February 28, 1996 (age 30)
- Place of birth: Quảng Điền, Thừa Thiên Huế, Vietnam
- Height: 1.74 m (5 ft 9 in)
- Position: Defender

Team information
- Current team: Hoàng Anh Gia Lai
- Number: 28

Youth career
- 2007–2014: Hoàng Anh Gia Lai

Senior career*
Years	Team	Apps	(Gls)
2015–	Hoàng Anh Gia Lai	70	(0)
2017	→ FC Uijeongbu (loan)	28	(2)
2021–2022	→ Công An Nhân Dân (loan)	6	(1)
- * Club domestic league appearances and goals as of 7 June 2026

Nguyễn Hữu Anh Tài (born 28 February 1996) is a Vietnamese professional footballer who plays as a defender for V.League 1 club Hoàng Anh Gia Lai.

In January 2017 Hữu Anh Tài completed a loan move to FC Uijeongbu, a Korean semiprofessional team playing in the K3 League or Third division.

== Honours ==
Công An Nhân Dân

- V.League 2: 2022
