= Guillaume Graechen =

French-born Vietnamese football coach

Personal information
- Date of birth: 24 April 1977 (age 49)
- Place of birth: Vernon, France
- Height: 1.70 m (5 ft 7 in)
- Position: Midfielder

Team information
- Current team: Hoàng Anh Gia Lai (manager)

Senior career*
Years	Team	Apps	(Gls)
1994–1995	Cercle Dijon	21	(0)
1995–1996	Angers	28	(0)
1996–1998	Sedan	42	(0)
1998–2006	Romorantin	206	(8)
2006–2007	Imphy-Decize	16	(1)
Total		313	(9)

Managerial career
- 2007–2014: HAGL - Arsenal JMG
- 2013–2014: Vietnam U19
- 2015: Hoàng Anh Gia Lai
- * Club domestic league appearances and goals

Guillaume Graechen (born 24 April 1977), also known as Doan Guillaume Duong, is a French-born Vietnamese football manager and former football player. He started his career as a football player at Dijon and played in France until 2007. That year, while working as a football scout for Jean-Marc Guillou, he was introduced by Arsène Wenger to the owner of Hoang Anh Gia Lai FC who was recruiting a manager for his new academy. Since 2007, Graechen has been the coach for HAGL Arsenal–JMG Academy. As a coach, he has helped many Vietnamese football players advance their careers. In 2014, he was the coach for the Vietnam national under-19 football team, and guided the team again in 2019.
