= Nguyễn Tuấn Anh =

Vietnamese footballer (born 1995)

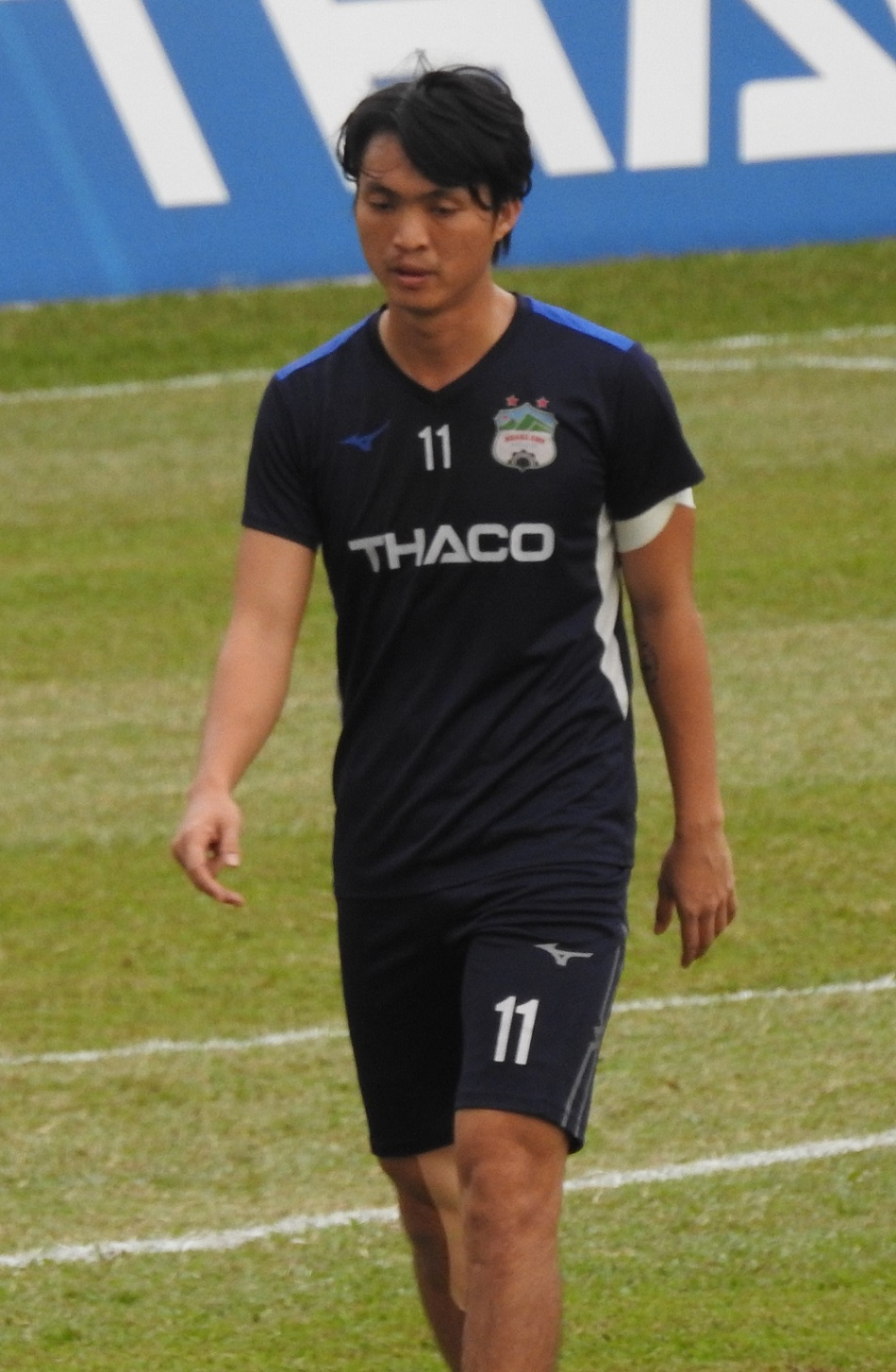
- Tuấn Anh in 2020

Personal information
- Full name: Nguyễn Tuấn Anh
- Date of birth: 16 May 1995 (age 31)
- Place of birth: Quỳnh Phụ, Thái Bình, Vietnam
- Height: 1.75 m (5 ft 9 in)
- Position: Defensive midfielder

Team information
- Current team: Thép Xanh Nam Định
- Number: 11

Youth career
- 2007–2014: Hoàng Anh Gia Lai

Senior career*
Years	Team	Apps	(Gls)
2015–2024	Hoàng Anh Gia Lai	126	(4)
2016	→ Yokohama FC (loan)	0	(0)
2024	→ Thép Xanh Nam Định (loan)	11	(0)
2024–	Thép Xanh Nam Định	37	(1)

International career^{‡}
2013–2014	Vietnam U19	23	(1)
2015–2018	Vietnam U23	16	(2)
2016–2024	Vietnam	48	(1)
Medal record
Men's football
Representing Vietnam
AFF Championship
Runner-up	ASEAN 2022	Team
AFF U-19 Youth Championship
Runner-up	Indonesia 2013
Runner-up	Vietnam 2014
- * Club domestic league appearances and goals as of 7 June 2026 ‡ National team caps and goals as of 6 June 2024

Nguyễn Tuấn Anh (born 16 May 1995) is a Vietnamese professional footballer who plays as a defensive midfielder for Thép Xanh Nam Định.

Tuấn Anh is considered one of the most talented and technically gifted midfielders of Vietnam. He is a product of HAGL – Arsenal JMG Academy and was promoted to Hoàng Anh Gia Lai's first team in 2015. Tuấn Anh has represented the Vietnam national team at U-19 and U-23 level. He was voted as young player of the year in 2014.

== Early life ==
Tuấn Anh was born on 16th May 1995 in Mai Trang, An Quý, Quỳnh Phụ district, Thái Bình province to Nguyễn Văn Dung, a doctor, and Nguyễn Thị Loan. He's the second child in a family of two siblings, he has an older sister named Quỳnh Mai. His father, Nguyễn Văn Dung is the deputy director of Phụ Dục general hospital in Quỳnh Phụ, Thái Bình, he wanted his son to become a doctor but Tuấn Anh expressed that he loves football more than anything. Tuan Anh's family was later persuaded by his enthusiasm for football and allowed him to follow his dream.

Tuấn Anh was a part of Thái Bình province U-11 football team that won the second place in 2004 national youth football tournament in Khánh Hòa province when he was 9. His performance caught the attention of staffs from Thái Bình province's football talent school and he was offered a place at the school. After 7 months of living there, his parents withdrew him from the school due to their concern about living standard there even though the school highly rated Tuấn Anh and really wanted to keep him.

== Club career ==
=== HAGL - Arsenal JMG Academy ===
In 2007, Tuấn Anh passed the try-out for HAGL – Arsenal JMG Academy, he was one of only 14 players that got accepted into the academy out of about 7 thousand candidates from all over the country in the first selection.

In June 2010, Tuấn Anh and Nguyễn Công Phượng were the only 2 players from HAGL JMG Academy that were invited to a 15 days oversea training program in Mali, It was a training program for top players of JMG Academy from all over the globe. Tuấn Anh was praised and highly rated by the academy's director Jean-Marc Guillou during the training program.

In November 2012, Tuấn Anh along with Nguyễn Công Phượng, Lương Xuân Trường, Trần Hữu Đông Triều were four of the players from the academy received the invitation to train with Arsenal F.C. U-17 team. In the letter, Arsenal's performance supervisor, Steve Morrow stated that coach Arsène Wenger was impressed with the academy's players when they beat Arsenal U-17 team in January. After the training end, Tuấn Anh was the player impressed coach Arsène Wenger the most, he even introduced Tuấn Anh to a Greeks football club for a trial. Unfortunately Tuấn Anh missed the trial opportunity as he suffered from a serious ligament injury in early 2012 that took him 6 month to recover. He was sent to a hospital in Paris that specialize in treating injures for sport athlete for the knee operation.

Tuấn Anh was voted as player of the tournament at 2014 International U-21 Thanh Niên Newspaper Cup where HAGL – Arsenal JMG Academy team was crowned as the champion after defeated Thailand U-21 (3-0) in the final.

=== Hoàng Anh Gia Lai ===
Tuấn Anh was promoted to Hoàng Anh Gia Lai F.C. first team along with other academy's player from the first selection in 2015 when the club revolutionized their first team, most of their first team players were released, only a few was kept to guide young player from the academy. Tuấn Anh was promoted to first team along with other academy's player from the first selection.

Tuấn Anh made his V.League 1 debut on 4 January 2015 at the opening game of the season against Sanna Khanh Hoa F.C. He score his first league goal in this game as Hoàng Anh Gia Lai F.C. won the game 4–2. On 14 April, Tuấn Anh won the 2014 young player of the year award with 49 votes, 10 votes more than his club mate Nguyễn Công Phượng at second place. Tuấn Anh was also voted as the team's best player at the end of the season, he has the most appearances in the team, played in all 26 league games of the season including 25 starts.

==== Yokohama FC (loan) ====
Tuấn Anh joined Yokohama FC in December 2015 in a season-long loan. Tuấn Anh had an impressive game for the club against AC Nagano Parceiro in the emperor's cup, where he won a penalty for his team and scored the winning goal in a 3-2 win.

=== Thep Xanh Nam Dinh ===
On 11 March 2024, Tuấn Anh joined V.League 1 club Thep Xanh Nam Dinh on a loan deal until the end of the 2023–24 season. He made 11 appearances for Nam Dinh in the second part of the season as the club won the league title.

On 13 July 2024, Tuấn Anh's transfer to Nam Dinh was made permanent as he signed a three-year contract with the club.

== International career ==
=== Vietnam U19 ===
Tuấn Anh first played for Vietnam U-19 team at 2013 AFF U-19 Youth Championship. He captained his team in the final as they lost to the host Indonesia U-19 in the penalty shoot-out. Tuấn Anh was voted as the player of the tournament.

Throughout 2013 to 2014, Tuấn Anh was an important part of the U-19 team he played in all of their competitions such as: 2014 AFC U-19 Championship qualification where his team came out as Group F winner after they shockingly beat Australia U-19 (5-1), 2014 AFF U-19 Youth Championship where they finished second, and 2014 AFC U-19 Championship.

=== Vietnam U23 ===
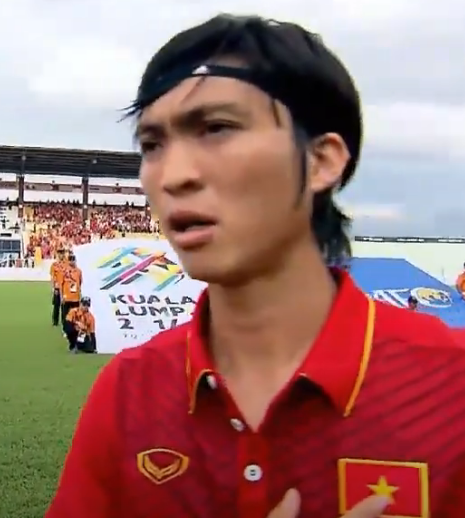
Tuấn Anh with Vietnam U22 at the 2017 SEA Games

Tuấn Anh was called to the Vietnam U-23 team in March 2015 to play in 2016 AFC U-23 Championship qualification. He played at the opening game in which his team beat host Malaysia U-23 (2-1) before missed out the last match again Macau U-23 due to injury. After the Vietnam U-23 team qualified, he played in the 2016 AFC U-23 Championship and scored one goal against UAE-U-23.

=== Senior ===
On March 24, 2016, Nguyen Tuan Anh made his first appearance for the Vietnam national team against Chinese Taipei in the 2018 FIFA World Cup qualification round for Asia, which Vietnam won 4-1. He scored his first goal for the Vietnam national team in the 5-2 victory over North Korea in a friendly on October 6, 2016.

On May 27, 2019, he was called up for the 2019 King's Cup, which took place in Buriram, Thailand. On August 22, 2019, Tuan Anh was named in the preliminary list of 27 players for the Vietnam national team to face Thailand in the 2022 FIFA World Cup qualification round for Asia.

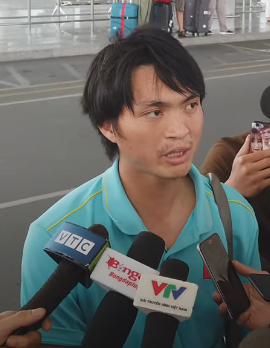
Tuấn Anh in 2019

In the match against Thailand on September 5, 2019, coach Park Hang-seo deployed Tuan Anh as a defensive midfielder, and he played the full 90 minutes.In Vietnam's 1-0 victory over the United Arab Emirates on November 14, 2019, Tuan Anh was named man of the match.

On May 6, 2021, Tuan Anh was named in the preliminary list of 37 players for the Vietnam national team to play a friendly against Jordan and participate in the remaining three matches of the 2022 FIFA World Cup qualification second round for Asia. He continued to be included in the list of 29 official players to go to the United Arab Emirates.

On December 12, 2021, Tuan Anh made his first appearance in the AFF Cup in the 3-0 victory of Vietnam national team over Malaysia national team.

== Career statistics ==
=== National team ===
As of 6 June 2024. Statistics count only matches at FIFA national team and international friendly matches

Year	Apps	Goals
Vietnam
2016	6	1
2017	1	0
2019	5	0
2021	11	0
2022	8	0
2023	4	0
2024	4	0
Total	45	1

Year	Apps	Goals
U-23 Vietnam
2015	4	0
2016	4	1
2017	3	1
Total	11	2

Year	Apps	Goals
U-19 Vietnam
2013	9	0
2014	14	1
Total	23	1

=== International goals ===
==== U-19 ====
Scores and results list Vietnam's goal tally first.

#	Date	Venue	Opponent	Score	Result	Competition
1	11 September 2014	Hanoi, Vietnam	Myanmar	1–0	4–1	2014 AFF U-19 Youth Championship

==== U-23 ====
Scores and results list Vietnam's goal tally first.

#	Date	Venue	Opponent	Score	Result	Competition
1	20 January 2016	Doha, Qatar	United Arab Emirates	2–1	2–3	2016 AFC U-23 Championship
2	19 July 2017	Ho Chi Minh City, Vietnam	Timor-Leste	4–0	4–0	2018 AFC U-23 Championship qualification

==== Vietnam ====
Scores and results list Vietnam's goal tally first.

No	Date	Venue	Opponent	Score	Result	Competition
1.	6 October 2016	Thống Nhất Stadium, Ho Chi Minh City, Vietnam	North Korea	1–1	5–2	Friendly

== Honours ==
Thép Xanh Nam Định

- V.League 1: 2023–24, 2024–25
- Vietnamese Super Cup: 2024

Vietnam

- VFF Cup: 2022
- King's Cup runner-up: 2019
- AFF Championship runner-up: 2022

Vietnam U19

- AFF U-19 Youth Championship runner-up: 2013, 2014
- Hassanal Bolkiah Trophy runner-up: 2014
