= Đô Lương district =

District of Vietnam

Coordinates: 18°53′33″N 105°20′25″E

Đô Lương District Huyện Đô Lương
- District
- Interactive map of Đô Lương District
- Country: Vietnam
- Region: North Central Coast
- Province: Nghệ An
- Capital: Đô Lương

Area
  - Total: 137 sq mi (354 km^{2})

Population (2003)
  - Total: 193,890
- Time zone: UTC+07:00 (Indochina Time)

Đô Lương is a former rural district of Nghệ An province in the North Central Coast region of Vietnam. As of 2003, the district had a population of 193,890. The district covers an area of 354 km^{2} (137 sq mi). The district capital lies at Đô Lương.

== Climate ==
Climate data for Đô Lương
Month	Jan	Feb	Mar	Apr	May	Jun	Jul	Aug	Sep	Oct	Nov	Dec	Year
Record high °C (°F)	34.6 (94.3)	36.6 (97.9)	39.2 (102.6)	43.1 (109.6)	41.1 (106.0)	41.4 (106.5)	40.5 (104.9)	40.3 (104.5)	38.7 (101.7)	36.9 (98.4)	37.0 (98.6)	32.6 (90.7)	43.1 (109.6)
Mean daily maximum °C (°F)	21.0 (69.8)	21.7 (71.1)	24.5 (76.1)	29.0 (84.2)	32.9 (91.2)	34.2 (93.6)	34.1 (93.4)	32.9 (91.2)	31.1 (88.0)	28.4 (83.1)	25.6 (78.1)	22.4 (72.3)	28.1 (82.6)
Daily mean °C (°F)	17.7 (63.9)	18.5 (65.3)	20.9 (69.6)	24.6 (76.3)	27.8 (82.0)	29.2 (84.6)	29.2 (84.6)	28.2 (82.8)	26.8 (80.2)	24.7 (76.5)	21.8 (71.2)	18.8 (65.8)	24.0 (75.2)
Mean daily minimum °C (°F)	15.5 (59.9)	16.6 (61.9)	18.8 (65.8)	22.0 (71.6)	24.4 (75.9)	25.9 (78.6)	25.9 (78.6)	25.2 (77.4)	24.2 (75.6)	22.2 (72.0)	19.4 (66.9)	16.3 (61.3)	21.4 (70.5)
Record low °C (°F)	5.0 (41.0)	7.8 (46.0)	7.8 (46.0)	12.5 (54.5)	16.3 (61.3)	19.5 (67.1)	21.6 (70.9)	22.0 (71.6)	17.8 (64.0)	14.4 (57.9)	10.1 (50.2)	5.4 (41.7)	5.0 (41.0)
Average precipitation mm (inches)	32.7 (1.29)	30.9 (1.22)	42.2 (1.66)	80.8 (3.18)	164.8 (6.49)	142.8 (5.62)	157.4 (6.20)	256.9 (10.11)	407.0 (16.02)	357.8 (14.09)	102.6 (4.04)	37.3 (1.47)	1,813.2 (71.39)
Average rainy days	11.7	12.4	13.3	12.2	13.4	10.4	10.7	15.0	15.7	15.0	10.8	9.1	149.5
Average relative humidity (%)	87.0	88.1	88.4	86.8	81.8	78.3	78.3	83.1	86.0	85.5	85.1	84.6	84.4
Mean monthly sunshine hours	75.0	59.6	72.5	126.5	199.0	192.4	201.1	173.3	151.2	128.4	107.7	89.3	1,572.5
Source: Vietnam Institute for Building Science and Technology
