= Hoang Anh Gia Lai Group =

Vietnamese company

Hoang Anh Gia Lai JSC
- Trade name: HAGL Group; Hoàng Anh Gia Lai
- Native name: CTCP Hoàng Anh Gia Lai
- Type: Joint Stock Company
- Traded as: HOSE: HAG
- Industry: Furniture, Real estate, Rubber, Sugar, Football, Mining, Electricity, Hospital
- Founded: 1990
- Founder: Đoàn Nguyên Đức
- Headquarters: Pleiku, Gia Lai, Vietnam
- Key people: Đoàn Nguyên Đức (chairman); Nguyễn Văn Sự (general director); Nguyễn Văn Tốn (Supervisory Board)
- Revenue: 4,399.5 bn VND (2012)
- Operating income: 613.8 bn VND (2012)
- Net income: 365.2 bn VND (2012)
- Total assets: 21,284 bn VND (2012)
- Number of employees: 9842 (2011)
- Website: hagl.com.vn

Hoang Anh Gia Lai Group (HAGL Group; Vietnamese: Tập đoàn Hoàng Anh Gia Lai), registered as Hoang Anh Gia Lai Joint Stock Company (Vietnamese: Công ty Cổ phần Hoàng Anh Gia Lai), less formally known by its trading name Hoàng Anh Gia Lai (HAGL), is a diversified company headquartered in Pleiku, Vietnam.

From a small furniture producer the company diversified into other industries such as rubber, finances a football club (Hoang Anh Gia Lai Club) and was Vietnam's largest property developer in 2010 and the second largest in 2011 (behind Vingroup). It has also grown significantly outside of Vietnam, with investments of around $1bn in Laos, hundreds of millions in Myanmar, $100m in Cambodia and tens of millions of dollars in Thailand.

== History ==
Hoang Anh Gia Lai was set up in 1990 as a small factory in Pleiku producing furniture and employing 200 workers. Another wood processing plant was added in 1993 in the suburbs of Pleiku. The company diversified into granite processing in 2002 and later real estate and hotels.

HAGL was registered as a joint stock company in 2006.

=== Controversy ===
HAGL has been accused of razing indigenous lands in Cambodia during the COVID-19 crisis when the nearby villages, which depend on local resources in the ancestral forests for their livelihoods, were in lockdown. In March 2019, the governor of Ratanakiri province in Cambodia requested that the national Ministry of Agriculture, Forestry and Fisheries return 742 hectares of customary land wrongly included in HAGL's agricultural land concessions to 12 local communities following a demarcation process that began in 2018.

HAGL appealed, arguing that 150 hectares of the 742 hectares had already been cleared and planted and should therefore remain within its concession. But as coronavirus delayed the ministry's decision, the firm bulldozed another 45 hectares of indigenous territory, laying waste to two spirit mountains, wetlands, old-growth forest as well as traditional hunting areas and burial grounds of spiritual value to the villagers.

== Industries ==
=== Real estate ===
HAGL is established in Vietnam's residential property development business, with a focus Ho Chi Minh City's mid-tier market. It has secured enough land for proposed projects for the period from 2012 to 2016. The land has been procured at prices lower than the current market value (May 2011), resulting in prospects for high profit margins.

HAGL built the athletes' village for the 2009 Southeast Asian Games in Vientiane, Laos. In return, it received a large rubber concession in Laos' north-east. The company is developing an 8ha complex in Yangon, Myanmar including a hotel, mall, offices and apartments with a total planned investment of US$300 million. The project was approved in December 2012 after long negotiations.

HAGL also operates a chain of 4 and 5 star hotels and resorts in Ho Chi Minh City, Da Lat, Da Nang, Nha Trang, Quy Nhon etc.

=== Rubber and other cash crops ===
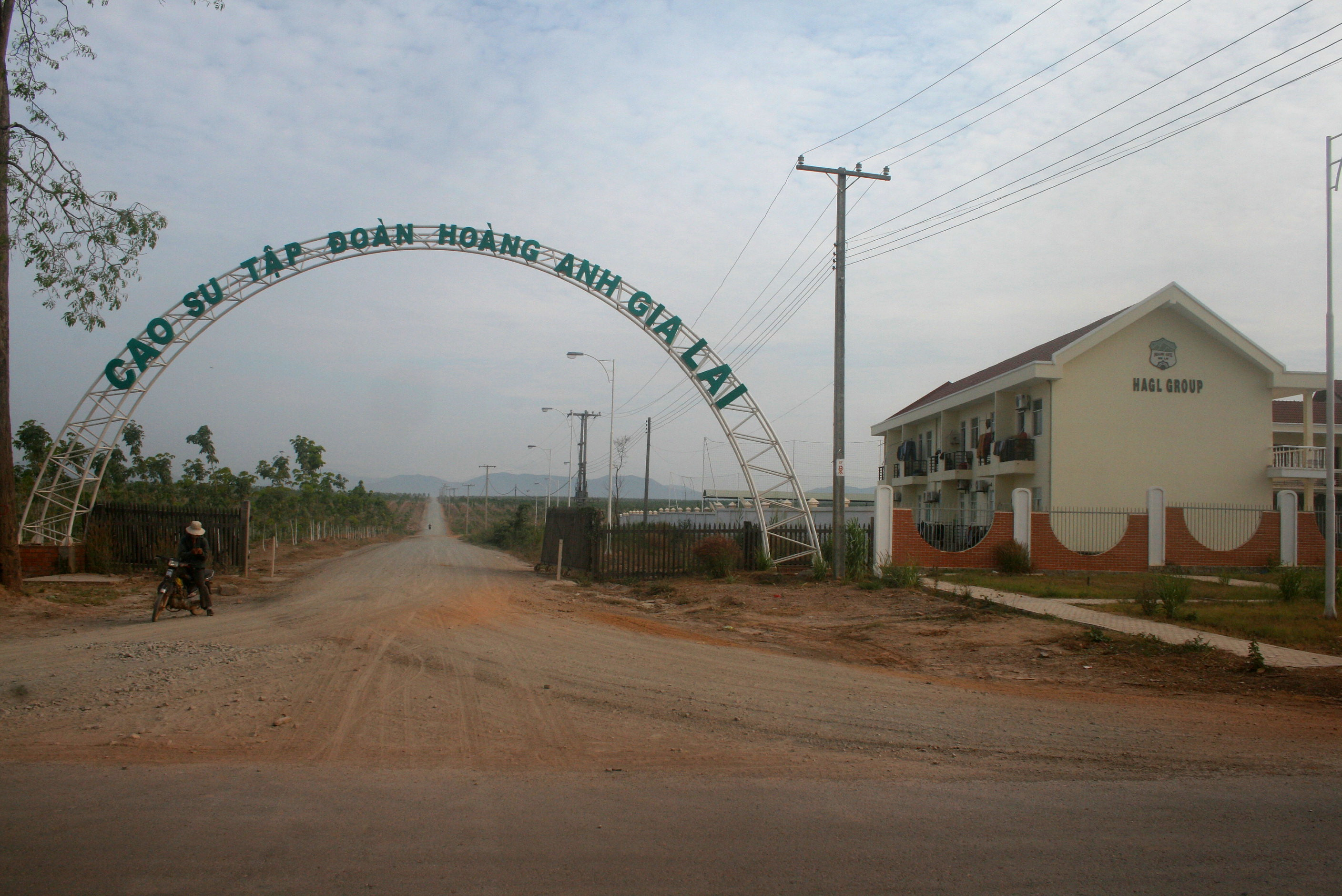
HAGL rubber plantation in Attapeu Province

HAGL operates rubber plantations in the Vietnamese provinces of Gia Lai and Đắk Lắk, as well as Cambodia and Laos. It is investing at least US$225 million to expand the area of its rubber plantations to 51,000 by 2012, at least 25,000 of which are being planted in Laos. It has acquired rights to grow rubber trees in Attapeu Province in the south-east of Laos and in the north-east of the country. The rubber plantations are also expected to provide three million cubic meters of wood, which will be used in the group's wood processing and furniture business. A major customer buying rubber from HAGL is Michelin.

HAGL has a subsidiary and several joint ventures in the rubber industry:

- HAGL Rubber (200bn VND capital, 99% owned by HAGL)
- Hoang Anh - Quang Minh Rubber (100bn, 57.5%)
- Ban Me Rubber (25bn, 66.6%)
- Hoang Anh - Mang Yang Rubber (45.39bn, 40%)

HAGL is currently expanding into the sugar industry. Construction of a $100 million sugar industrial cluster started in Attapeu Province of Laos in November 2011. Production of refined sugar and electricity began in January 2013.

=== Energy ===
HAGL has been investing in electricity projects, mainly hydro power. Construction of two dams in the north-central province of Thanh Hóa started in 2009 at a cost of around 500bn VND. Several other projects are being planned or under construction in the Central Highlands of Vietnam. HAGL has three hydro power projects, as well as a 28MW thermo-power plant project, in Laos Electricity from these power plants will be sold to a Lao partner rather than Vietnam's Vietnam Electricity because the former's prices are around 30% higher.

Some of HAGL's power plants are developed by its subsidiary HAGL Hydro Power (CTCP Thủy Điện HAGL) which has a capital stock of 100bn VND, 70% of which is owned by HAGL Group. Other joint ventures include the following:

- Hoang Anh Dakbla Hydro Power (110bn, 70%)
- Hoang Anh Phat Tai Hydro Power (100bn, 75%)
- Hoang Anh Tona Hydro Power (150bn, 94.38%)

=== Mining ===
HAGL has recently been diversifying into mining. It has subsidiaries and joint ventures in the Central Highlands South Central Coast and North Central Coast of Vietnam and Xekong Province of Laos:

- HAGL Mining (200bn VND, 75% owned by HAGL Group)
- Gia Lai Mining (140bn, 51%)
- Quảng Ngãi Mining (100bn, 80%)
- Hoang Anh Thanh Hóa Mining (200bn, 83.7%)
- Kbang Mining (100bn, 66.93%)
- Hoang Anh GL - Kon Tum (50bn, 83.7%)
- Hoang Anh Xekong Mining (5.3bn, 83.7%)

== Financial information ==
	Revenues (bn VND)	Profit before tax (vn VND)	Net profit (bn VND)
2012	4,399.52	524.89	365.24
2011	3,152.11	1,701.90	1,325.32
2010	4,526.47	3,017.41	2,222.08
2009	4,370.25	1,743.5	1,286.9
2008	1,885.15	1,006.16	765.34
2007	1,589.43	869.71	622.34

== Financing ==
Apart from domestic bank loans, HAGL has been able to tap into international financial markets to finance its rubber and hydro power projects. It is Vietnam's first company to list global depository receipts (GDRs) in 2011, from which it raised 56.5 million US$.

It has also issued bonds in the Singaporean market. One of its main investors there has been Singapore's government-owned Temasek Holdings, which invested 110 million US$ until May 2011 and spent another 5.39 million (1.13 trillion VND) in July 2011.

HAGL has received loans from Dragon Capital Group and Vietnamese Enterprise Investments, two Vietnamese lenders that the World Bank’s private-sector arm, the International Finance Corporation (IFC), has invested in. As a result of the IFC financing, 12 communities affected by disputed lands awarded to HAGL filed a complaint with the Compliance Advisor Ombudsman, the IFC's independent watchdog, in 2014. An IFC-led dispute resolution process followed, during which HAGL first agreed to return land within its concessions that belonged to the villages, only to eventually pull out of the negotiations. The IFC no longer has direct financial links with HAGL. The villagers lodged a second complaint with the body in March 2019, providing extensive evidence of HAGL's breaches of IFC's environmental and social performance standards.
