= 2018 Vinaphone Cup =

Giải Bóng Đá Quốc Tế Cúp Vinaphone 2018

Tournament details
- Host country: Vietnam
- City: Hanoi
- Dates: 3–7 August 2018
- Teams: 4 (from 1 confederation)
- Venue(s): 1 (in 1 host city)

Final positions
- Champions: Vietnam (3rd title)
- Runners-up: Palestine
- Third place: Uzbekistan
- Fourth place: Oman

Tournament statistics
- Matches played: 6
- Goals scored: 11 (1.83 per match)
- Attendance: 97,210 (16,202 per match)
- Top scorer(s): (Palestine) Oday Dabbagh (Uzbekistan) Nurillo Tukhtashinov (2 goals each)

The 2018 Vinaphone Cup (also known as the tenth edition of VFF Cup) is an international Olympic association football friendly tournament, sponsored by Vietnam Posts and Telecommunications Group (VNPT) with the competition is named after Vinaphone, a subsidiary-mobile network which is part of VNPT. Vietnam as the hosts use the tournament as their preparation for the Asian Games held in Indonesia.

Vietnam emerged as the tournament champions with 7 points ahead the rest teams.

== Participating teams ==
The following are the list of teams participating the tournament.

Team	Best U-23 Asian Cup finish	Best Olympic finish	Best Asian Games finish
Oman	Group stage (2013, 2018)	none	Quarterfinals (2010)
Palestine	Quarterfinals (2018)	none	Round of 16 (2014)
Uzbekistan	Champions (2018)	none	Quarterfinals (2006, 2010)
Vietnam	Runners-up (2018)	none	Round of 16 (2010, 2014)

== Match officials ==
The following referees and their assistants were chosen for the tournament.

Referees

- (Malaysia) Nazmi Nasaruddin
- (Malaysia) Suhaizi Shukri
- (Vietnam) Hoàng Ngọc Hà
- (Vietnam) Nguyễn Hiền Triết

Assistant referees

- (Malaysia) Azman Ismail
- (Malaysia) Yusri Muhamad

== Regulation ==
The tournament is decided through a round-robin format with team with the highest point will become the winner.

=== Prize money ===
Prize money amounts were announced in July 2018.

Position	Amount (thousand USD)	
Position	Per team	Total
Champion	$50,000	50
Runner-up	$30,000	30
Third place	$10,000	10
Total		90

== Venue ==
All matches were to be played in National Stadium, Hanoi.

Hanoi
Mỹ Đình National Stadium
Capacity: 40,192
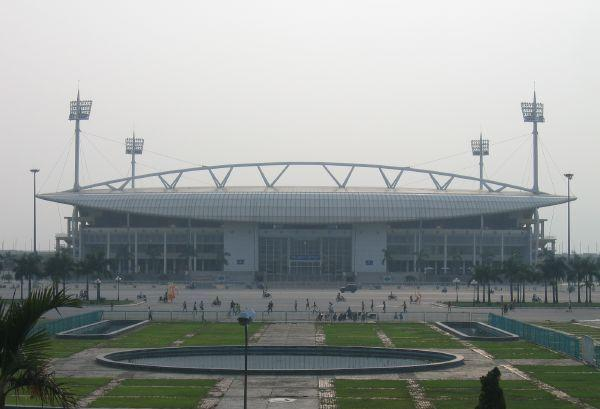

== Standings ==
Pos	Team	Pld	W	D	L	GF	GA	GD	Pts
1	Vietnam (C, H)	3	2	1	0	4	2	+2	7
2	Palestine	3	1	1	1	4	4	0	4
3	Uzbekistan	3	0	2	1	2	3	−1	2
4	Oman	3	0	2	1	1	2	−1	2

Source: Vietnam Football Federation
Rules for classification: 1) Points; 2) Head-to-head; 3) Goal difference; 4) Goals scored; 5) Fair-play points; 6) Penalty shoot-out
(C) Champions; (H) Hosts

== Results ==
- Times listed are local, Vietnam standard time (UTC+7).
3 August 2018
16:30

Uzbekistan	0–0	Oman
	Report (PLO); Report (Zing.vn)

Mỹ Đình National Stadium, Hanoi
Attendance: 1,183
Referee: Nguyễn Hiền Triết (Vietnam)
3 August 2018
19:30

Vietnam	2–1	Palestine
Anh Đức 45+1'; Công Phượng 52'	Report (PLO); Report (Zing.vn)	Dabbagh 28'

Mỹ Đình National Stadium, Hanoi
Attendance: 18,457
Referee: Suhaizi Shukri (Malaysia)

5 August 2018
16:30

Palestine	2–1	Uzbekistan
El Cherif 8'; Dabbagh 26'	Report (PLO); Report (Zing.vn)	Tukhtashinov 13'

Mỹ Đình National Stadium, Hanoi
Attendance: 2,054
Referee: Hoàng Ngọc Hà (Vietnam)
5 August 2018
19:30

Oman	0–1	Vietnam
	Report (PLO); Report (Zing.vn)	Văn Hậu 89'

Mỹ Đình National Stadium, Hanoi
Attendance: 30,859
Referee: Nazmi Nasaruddin (Malaysia)

7 August 2018
16:30

Palestine	1–1	Oman
Obaid 22'	Report (PLO); Report (Zing.vn)	Sulaiman 90+1'

Mỹ Đình National Stadium, Hanoi
Attendance: 4,465
Referee: Nguyễn Hiền Triết (Vietnam)
7 August 2018
19:30

Vietnam	1–1	Uzbekistan
Văn Đức 80'	Report (PLO); Report (Zing.vn)	Tukhtashinov 66'

Mỹ Đình National Stadium, Hanoi
Attendance: 40,192
Referee: Suhaizi Shukri (Malaysia)

Vinaphone Cup Winners
(Vietnam)
Vietnam
3rd title

== Goalscorers ==
2 goals

- (Palestine) Oday Dabbagh
- (Uzbekistan) Nurillo Tukhtashinov

1 goal

- (Oman) Zahir Sulaiman
- (Palestine) Mohammed Obaid
- (Palestine) Omar El Cherif
- (Vietnam) Nguyễn Anh Đức
- (Vietnam) Phan Văn Đức
- (Vietnam) Đoàn Văn Hậu
- (Vietnam) Nguyễn Công Phượng
