= Đắk Đoa district =

Đak Đoa district Huyện Đak Đoa
- District
- Interactive map of Đak Đoa district
- Country: Vietnam
- Region: Central Highlands
- Province: Gia Lai province
- Capital: Đak Đoa

Area
  - Total: 335.36 sq mi (868.57 km^{2})

Population (31/12/2024)
  - Total: 128,209
  - Density: 382.31/sq mi (147.61/km^{2})
- Time zone: UTC+7 (Indochina Time)

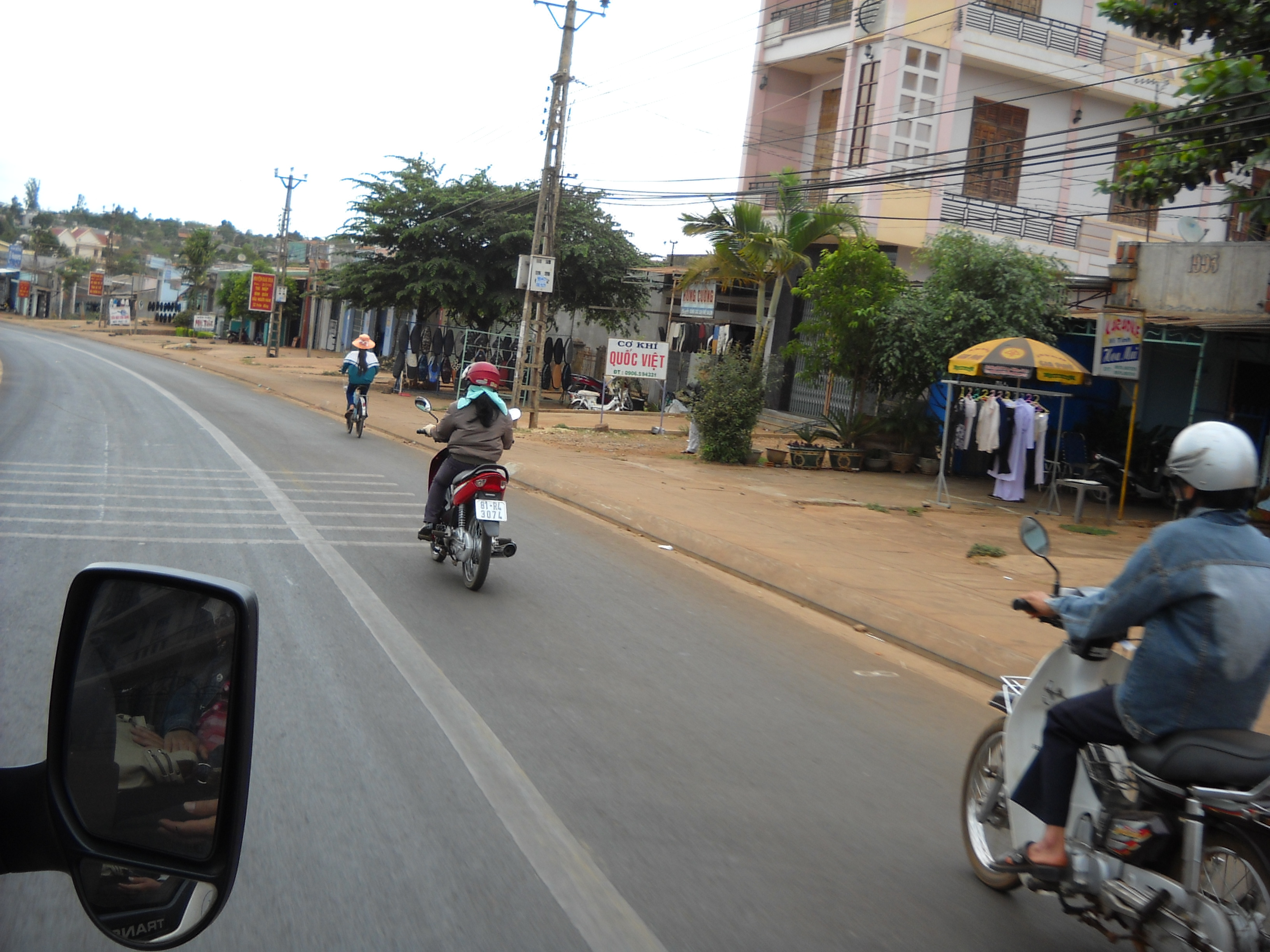

Đắk Đoa is a district (huyện) of Gia Lai province in the Central Highlands region of Vietnam.

== History ==
Its name Đắc Đoa or Dar-doa (old) in Kinh text was from Daàk-d'ui in Jarai language. It means "the spring of pine trees".

Before becoming a rural district, Dak Doa had a very low population and almost existed like a deserted land because of the war as well as barren. The water source here is maintained at a very low level, so in the 1990s began to have underground water search projects under the life of the US government through two private companies from Saigon. This project has made an important contribution to promoting population growth and implementing industrialization programs. However, until 2024, Dak Doa was basically only forestry locality.

As of 2003 the district had a population of 85,362. The district covers an area of 980 km^{2}. The district capital lies at Đak Đoa. About 2/3 of the district's area are included in the forest's green protection program, which is prohibited from all forms of improvement in the direction of urbanization.
