= Trần Hữu Đông Triều =

Vietnamese footballer

Personal information
- Full name: Trần Hữu Đông Triều
- Date of birth: 20 August 1995 (age 31)
- Place of birth: Đại Lộc, Quảng Nam, Vietnam
- Height: 1.70 m (5 ft 7 in)
- Position: Centre-back

Youth career
- 2007–2014: HAGL – Arsenal JMG Academy

Senior career*
Years	Team	Apps	(Gls)
2015–2022	Hoàng Anh Gia Lai	68	(3)
2019–2020	→ Becamex Bình Dương (loan)	11	(0)
2023	Quảng Nam	11	(0)
Total		90	(3)

International career
2013–2014	Vietnam U19	30	(5)
2016–2017	Vietnam U22	2	(0)
- * Club domestic league appearances and goals as of 2 October 2018

Trần Hữu Đông Triều (born 20 August 1995) is a former Vietnamese footballer who plays as a centre-back.

Trần Hữu Đông Triều is a graduate of Hoang Anh Gia Lai – Arsenal JMG Academy and made his senior debut for the club in January 2017. In 2019, he was opted for a loan spell at fellow V.League 1 side Becamex Binh Duong and returned to his parent club in 2021. In 2023, he joined V.League 2 club Quảng Nam.

== Honours ==
Becamex Bình Dương

- Vietnamese Super Cup runner-up: 2019

Quảng Nam

- V.League 2: (gold) 2023

Vietnam U19

- AFF U-19 Youth Championship runner-up: 2013, 2014
- Hassanal Bolkiah Trophy runner-up: 2014
