= Hoang Anh Gia Lai FC =

Vietnamese football club in Pleiku

Hoang Anh Gia Lai
- Full name: Hoang Anh Gia Lai Football Club
- Nickname: Đội bóng Phố Núi (The Highlanders)
- Short name: HAGL
- Founded: 1976; 50 years ago as Gia Lai-Kon Tum FC; 1991; 35 years ago as Gia Lai Football Team
- Ground: Pleiku Stadium
- Capacity: 12,000
- Owner: Hoang Anh Gia Lai Group
- Chairman: Đoàn Nguyên Đức
- Head coach: Lê Quang Trãi
- League: V.League 1
- 2025–26: V.League 1, 10th of 14
- Website: haglfc.vn
Home colours	Away colours	Third colours

Hoang Anh Gia Lai Football Club (Vietnamese: Câu lạc bộ Bóng đá Hoàng Anh Gia Lai), commonly known as Hoang Anh Gia Lai and simply known as HAGL, is a Vietnamese professional football club based in Pleiku, Gia Lai. Owned by Đoàn Nguyên Đức, a Vietnamese businessman and founder of Hoang Anh Gia Lai Group, HAGL play in the top division of Vietnamese football, V.League 1. Their home stadium is Pleiku Stadium.

== History ==
=== Early years ===
The forerunner of the club is Gia Lai - Kon Tum football team, founded in November 1975 and first compete in regional championship in the early of 1976. Despite being an amateur team, the team also once won the A2 championship (equivalent to the A2 championship) including South Central and Central Highlands. In 1991, the province Gia Lai - Kon Tum was separated into Gia Lai and Kon Tum. As the result, the team was split into the Gia Lai football team and Kon Tum football team. Some players of the former Gia Lai - Kon Tum team returned to be the core of the new Gia Lai team.

=== Hoang Anh Gia Lai era ===
For 10 years, the team was organized with the model of a career unit with an average performance in the First Division and not very well known on the football map of Vietnam. In 2001, the team was transformed into a semi-professional model under the sponsorship of Hoang Anh Gia Lai Group. Before the football season V.League 2 2001–2002, the club's chairman Đoàn Nguyên Đức signed a contract with the captain of Thailand national football team at that time, Kiatisuk Senamuang. In the Thai press ran big "headline" "Who is Hoang Anh? Where is Gia Lai" full of ridicule, and the media in Vietnam also have many doubts about the ability to attract a high-class player like Kiatisuk to Gia Lai. However, all rumors ended on February 17, 2002, when Kiatisuk and teammate defender Chukiat Noosarung came to Vietnam to prepare to play for the team. This is considered one of the most successful contracts of Vietnamese football. Kiatisuk helped Hoang Anh Gia Lai's team to be promoted right in that season. At the end of the season, the team was officially transferred to Hoang Anh Gia Lai Group for management, changed its name to Hoang Anh Gia Lai Football Club, becoming one of the first professional football club in Vietnam. The club made a record of winning the 2003 V-League championship after having just been promoted and successfully defended its title the following season. At the same time, the team also won two Vietnamese Super Cup in those years.

In the years that followed, the club built a team that was nicknamed "Dream Team" by Vietnamese fans, after Thai players like Dusit Chalermsan arrived to the team.

But the most successful period of this period of the club was 2007, when Hoang Anh Gia Lai succeeded in signing an agreement with the English football club Arsenal to open a football academy in Pleiku. Hoang Anh Gia Lai is also Arsenal's main partner in business in Southeast Asia. After two years, the development of the academy's first generation of players is considered very promising.

In the 2010 season, Hoang Anh Gia Lai club had a change in its team development plan when using many young players trained by themselves, instead of massively shopping like in previous seasons. At the same time, the club's legend, the former Thai striker,Kiatisuk Senamuang was invited by the club's president Doan Nguyen Duc to lead the team. The club has had a good momentum ahead of the new season when winning the Ho Chi Minh City football championship. Ho Chi Minh Open - Navibank Cup 2010. However, the performance at the national championship has not improved much when at the end of the season 2010 V-League, Hoang Anh Gia Lai only ranked 7th and runner up in the Vietnamese National Cup.

The 2011 season was a season where the performance of the whole team was very erratic. Although coach Dusit left the coaching chair after the first leg and was replaced by coach Huynh Van Anh, the team's performance not only did not improve but also showed signs of going down. At the end of 2011 V-League, Hoang Anh Gia Lai ranked 9th, this is the worst performance since the club came to play in V-League.

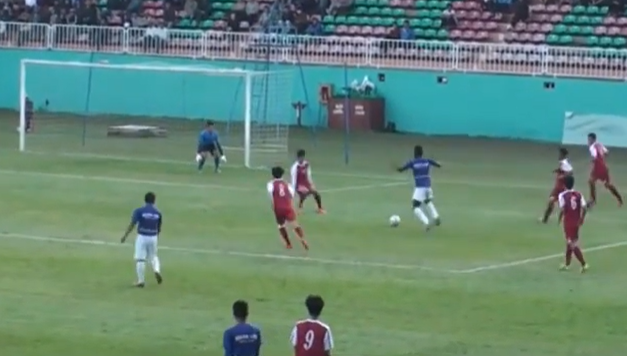
Hoang Anh Gia Lai FC (blue) in a friendly match against U19 Vietnam (red) in 2013, where they won 6-4.

In the 2012 season, Hoang Anh Gia Lai made a revolution in the coaching chair, when the club's board decided to invite Korean coach Choi Yoon Gyum to lead the team. The Korean coach has improved the player's fitness and professionalism. 5th place at the end of the season is still considered a good achievement for Mr. Choi Yoon-Gyum and the players.

From June 30, 2017, the entire cooperation between Arsenal and Hoang Anh Gia Lai ends. HAGL Academy – Arsenal JMG also changed its name to HAGL-JMG Academy.

In the 2021 V.League 1, Kiatisuk Senamuang were invited back to lead by the team's leadership. The club started V.League 1 not very well when they lost 1–0 to Saigon with a score of 1–0. This loss opened the team's 11-match unbeaten streak (won 9, drew 2) and helped the team reach the top 6 teams, before the 2021 season had to be stopped and then canceled because the impact of COVID-19 pandemic in Vietnam.

The team proactively prepared their squad by adding fitness assistant Witoon Mingkwan. Foreign players Washington Brandão and Kim Dong-su had their contracts extended. Brazilian midfielder Mauricio Barbosa was signed to replace Damir Memović. The team also added striker Jefferson Baiano to bolster their attacking power.

After a 17-year absence, Hoang Anh Gia Lai returned to the AFC Champions League - the highest club tournament in Asia (as the leading team of V.League 1 - 2021). The team finished the group stage with 5 points and third place, failing to advance to the round of 16. On 2 November 2023, due to sponsorship reasons, Hoang Anh Gia Lai Football Club changed its name to LPBank-Hoang Anh Gia Lai Football Club. On 31 July 2024, the club changed their name back to Hoang Anh Gia Lai FC, removing the sponsor name from the team's name.

== Stadium ==
Pleiku Stadium is a stadium located in Pleiku City, Gia Lai Province. It is the home of Hoang Anh Gia Lai Football Club and is also one of the few stadiums in Vietnam owned by a club.

In 2008, Pleiku Stadium was started and built new according to the model of Emirates Stadium of Arsenal, with a total construction cost of 60 billion VND invested entirely by HAGL Group. The newly built Pleiku Stadium was put into operation since October 2010, has a capacity of 12,000 seats and is fully equipped with seats.

== Youth academy ==
In the HAGL Academy, young players were trained from an early age to develop their ball controlling skills and to adopt a modern playing style. The academy placed the technical criteria as the priority while selecting players during youth trials. The Academy had produced several Vietnamese internationals such as Nguyễn Công Phượng, Nguyễn Tuấn Anh, Lương Xuân Trường, Nguyễn Văn Toàn and Vũ Văn Thanh, who managed who put up a successful career in Vietnam.

== Rivalries ==
=== Hanoi Football Club ===
In the 21st century, Hoang Anh Gia Lai and Hanoi are widely considered among the most supported clubs in Vietnam, and matches between the two clubs are usually dubbed the "Vietnamese Super Derby". From 2009 to the end of 2025, the two teams met 39 times in all competitions, with Hanoi holding the advantage with 19 wins, 8 draws and 12 losses. However, the rivalry began to attract greater attention in 2018, when Vietnam U-23 finished as runners-up at the AFC U-23 Championship with many players representing these two clubs in the squad. Since then, matches between Hoang Anh Gia Lai and Hanoi have become a major focus of media coverage.

== Kit manufacturers and shirt sponsors ==
Period	Kit Manufacturer	Sponsors
2003-2018	In house	Samsung Hoang Anh Gia Lai Pleiku Hoang Anh Gia Lai Rosso Hatrick GREE HAGL-Land TOA Paint VPBank HAGL Group GrowPlus+ NutiFood
2018	(Japan) Mizuno	IQLACPRO THACO Red Bull; BAPI
2023	(Japan) Mizuno	Carabao Energy Drink
2023–2025	(Vietnam) Kamito	Carabao Energy Drink LPBank
2025–	(Vietnam) Motive	ThaiGroup LPBank

== Players ==
=== Current squad ===
As of 28 August 2026

Note: Flags indicate national team as defined under FIFA eligibility rules; some limited exceptions apply. Players may hold more than one non-FIFA nationality.

No.	Pos.	Nation	Player
1	GK	VIE	Huỳnh Trần Bảo Duy
3	DF	VIE	Hà Châu Phi (on loan from Ninh Bình)
4	DF	VIE	Nguyễn Quốc Quang Huy
5	DF	BRA	Júlio César
6	MF	VIE	Trần Thanh Sơn
7	DF	VIE	Nguyễn Thanh Nhân
8	MF	VIE	Võ Đình Lâm
9	FW	BRA	Matheus Lucas
10	MF	BRA	Luann Augusto
12	FW	VIE	Nguyễn Minh Tâm
15	DF	VIE	Nguyễn Văn Triệu
16	FW	VIE	Trần Gia Bảo
18	MF	VIE	Phan Trí Dũng
19	DF	VIE	Nguyễn Duy Tâm

No.	Pos.	Nation	Player
20	MF	VIE	Cao Hoàng Minh
21	MF	VIE	Nguyễn Chí Hướng
22	MF	VIE	Nay Di Đan (on loan from Ninh Bình)
23	MF	VIE	Hoàng Vĩnh Nguyên
25	GK	VIE	Trần Trung Kiên
26	MF	VIE	Môi Sê
27	MF	VIE	Phan Nhật Thanh Long (on loan from Công An HCMC)
28	DF	VIE	Nguyễn Hữu Anh Tài
33	DF	BRA	Robson Reis
38	MF	VIE	Võ Phước Bảo
66	DF	VIE	Phan Du Học
69	GK	VIE	Nguyễn Vũ Khang
86	DF	VIE	Dụng Quang Vinh (on loan from Ninh Bình)

=== Other players under contract ===
Note: Flags indicate national team as defined under FIFA eligibility rules; some limited exceptions apply. Players may hold more than one non-FIFA nationality.

No.	Pos.	Nation	Player
17	MF	VIE	Hồ Minh Quyền
21	MF	VIE	Trần Thanh Tú
29	DF	VIE	Âu Dương Quân

No.	Pos.	Nation	Player
34	MF	VIE	Lê Huy Kiệt
49	GK	THA	Phong Chaloongphum (on loan from Ninh Bình)
59	GK	VIE	Nguyễn Thành Lợi

=== Out on loan ===
Note: Flags indicate national team as defined under FIFA eligibility rules; some limited exceptions apply. Players may hold more than one non-FIFA nationality.

No.	Pos.	Nation	Player
27	DF	VIE	Huỳnh Tuấn Vũ (to Hải Phòng until 1 July 2027)
32	MF	VIE	Phạm Ngô Minh Quang (to Quy Nhơn United until 1 July 2027)
—	GK	VIE	Dương Văn Lợi (to Quảng Ninh until 1 July 2027)
—	DF	VIE	Tô Minh Lộc (to (Laos) Champasak HAGL Avenir until 1 July 2027)
—	MF	VIE	Nguyễn Hùng Khang (to Quảng Ninh until 1 July 2027)
—	FW	VIE	Nguyễn Bảo Đức (to (Laos) Champasak HAGL Avenir until 1 July 2027)

=== Retired numbers ===
Note: Flags indicate national team as defined under FIFA eligibility rules; some limited exceptions apply. Players may hold more than one non-FIFA nationality.

No.	Pos.	Nation	Player
13	FW	THA	Kiatisuk Senamuang
14	DF	VIE	Võ Bá Khôi (posthumous honour)

=== Notable players ===
==== Domestic players ====
- (Vietnam) A Hoàng
- (Vietnam) Châu Ngọc Quang
- (Vietnam) Đinh Hồng Vinh
- (Vietnam) Đinh Thanh Bình
- (Vietnam) Đoàn Việt Cường
- (Vietnam) Lê Văn Sơn
- (Vietnam) Lương Xuân Trường
- (Vietnam) Nguyễn Công Phượng
- (Vietnam) Nguyễn Minh Nghĩa
- (Vietnam) Nguyễn Phong Hồng Duy
- (Vietnam) Nguyễn Tuấn Anh
- (Vietnam) Nguyễn Văn Đàn
- (Vietnam) Nguyễn Văn Toàn
- (Vietnam) Trần Minh Vương
- (Vietnam) Triệu Việt Hưng
- (Vietnam) Vũ Văn Thanh
- (Vietnam) Nguyễn Hữu Đang
- (Vietnam) Nguyễn Việt Thắng
- (Vietnam) Phùng Văn Nhiên
- (Vietnam) Văn Sỹ Hùng
- (Vietnam) Võ Văn Hạnh

==== Foreign players ====
- (Brazil) Washington Brandão
- (Brazil) Osmar Francisco
- (Brazil) Evaldo Goncalves
- (Ghana) Yaw Preko
- (Jamaica) Chevaughn Walsh
- (Jamaica) Rimario Gordon
- (Kenya) Allan Wanga
- (South Korea) Kim Dong-su
- (South Korea) Kim Bong-jin
- (Netherlands) Wieger Sietsma
- (Nigeria) Bassey Akpan
- (Nigeria) Felix Ogbuke
- (Nigeria) Olumuyiwa Aganun
- (Portugal) Paollo Madeira
- (Senegal) Papé Diakité
- (Serbia) Damir Memović
- (Thailand) Kiatisuk Senamuang
- (Thailand) Dusit Chalermsan
- (Thailand) Totchtawan Sripan
- (Thailand) Datsakorn Thonglao
- (Thailand) Nirut Surasiang
- (Thailand) Sakda Joemdee
- (Thailand) Chukiat Noosarung
- (United States) Mobi Fehr
- (United States) Lee Nguyen
- (Czech Republic) Michal Šilhavý

== Coaching staff ==
Position	Name
Technical director	(Vietnam) Vũ Tiến Thành
Head coach	(Vietnam) Lê Quang Trãi
Assistant coach	(Vietnam) Trần Quốc Việt (Vietnam) Vũ Anh Tuấn
Goalkeeper coach	(Brazil) Higor Felliny Cruz
Match analyst	(Vietnam) Bùi Văn Nam
Doctor	(Vietnam) Đồng Xuân Lâm (Vietnam) Trần Quốc Bách
Physiotherapist	(Vietnam) Đổng Hải Nguyên (Vietnam) Võ Tấn Dũng
Logistics officer	(Vietnam) Đinh Công Khánh

== Records ==
=== Continental record ===
Season	Competition	Round	Club	Home	Away	Aggregate
2004	AFC Champions League	Group F	(Indonesia) PSM Makassar	5–1	0–3	2nd out of 4
2004	AFC Champions League	Group F	(China) Dalian Shide	3–1	0–2	2nd out of 4
2004	AFC Champions League	Group F	(Thailand) Krung Thai Bank	0–1	2–2	2nd out of 4
2005	AFC Champions League	Group E	(South Korea) Suwon Samsung Bluewings	1–5	0–6	4th out of 4
2005	AFC Champions League	Group E	(Japan) Júbilo Iwata	0–1	0–6	4th out of 4
2005	AFC Champions League	Group E	(China) Shenzhen Jianlibao	0–2	0–5	4th out of 4
2022	AFC Champions League	Group H	(Japan) Yokohama F. Marinos	1–2	0–2	3rd out of 4
2022	AFC Champions League	Group H	(Australia) Sydney FC	1–0	1–1	3rd out of 4
2022	AFC Champions League	Group H	(South Korea) Jeonbuk Hyundai Motors	1–1	0–1	3rd out of 4

=== Regional record ===
Season	Competition	Round	Club	Home	Away	Aggregate
2003	ASEAN Club Championship	Group C	(Indonesia) Persita Tangerang	1–2		2nd out of 3
2003	ASEAN Club Championship	Group C	(Laos) MCTPC	2–1		2nd out of 3
2003	ASEAN Club Championship	Quarter-finals	(Thailand) BEC Tero Sasana	1–2		
2005	ASEAN Club Championship	Group A	(Malaysia) Pahang FA	0–4		2nd out of 4
2005	ASEAN Club Championship	Group A	(Cambodia) Nagacorp	5–1		2nd out of 4
2005	ASEAN Club Championship	Group A	(Timor-Leste) FC Zebra	14–1		2nd out of 4
2005	ASEAN Club Championship	Semi-finals	(Singapore) Tampines Rovers	0–0 (a.e.t.) (3–5 p)		

=== League record ===
Season	Pld	Won	Draw	Lost	GF	GA	GD	PTS	Final position	Notes
2000–01 Vietnamese First Division	22	9	4	9	26	20	+6	31	5th	
2001–02 Vietnamese First Division	22	13	2	7	38	32	+6	41	3rd	Promoted to the 2003 V-League
2003 V-League	22	12	7	3	41	26	+15	43	Champions	Qualified for 2004 AFC Champions League
2004 V-League	22	14	4	4	42	13	+29	46	Champions	Qualified for 2005 AFC Champions League
2005 V-League	22	9	5	8	30	24	+6	32	4th	
2006 V-League	24	10	6	8	24	21	+3	36	4th	
2007 V-League	26	12	5	9	40	33	+7	41	3rd	
2008 V-League	26	11	6	9	33	33	+2	39	7th	
2009 V-League	26	11	4	11	44	45	−1	37	6th	
2010 V-League	26	11	6	9	34	27	+7	39	7th	
2011 V-League	26	8	8	10	49	46	+3	32	9th	
2012 V-League	26	11	6	9	33	33	0	39	5th	
2013 V.League 1	20	10	5	5	24	16	+8	35	3rd	
2014 V.League 1	22	5	8	9	41	48	−7	23	9th	
2015 V.League 1	26	6	6	14	33	50	−17	24	13th	
2016 V.League 1	26	9	3	14	39	50	−11	30	12th	
2017 V.League 1	26	9	3	14	34	43	−9	30	10th	
2018 V.League 1	26	8	7	11	41	53	−12	31	10th	
2019 V.League 1	26	10	5	11	45	46	−1	35	8th	
2020 V.League 1	20	6	5	9	27	36	−9	23	7th	
2021 V.League 1	12	9	2	1	23	9	+14	29	Champions	Qualified for 2022 AFC Champions League
2022 V.League 1	24	7	11	6	26	24	+2	32	6th	
2023 V.League 1	18	5	8	5	19	19	0	23	10th	
2023–24 V.League 1	26	8	8	10	22	35	−13	32	11th	
2024–25 V.League 1	26	7	8	11	34	41	–7	29	9th	
2025–26 V.League 1	26	6	8	12	24	37	–13	26	10th	

== Managerial history ==
Head coaches by years (2003–present)

Name	Nat	Period	Honours
Vũ Văn Tư	(Vietnam)	1984–1987	
Huỳnh Văn Ảnh	(Vietnam)	1999–2002	
Arjhan Srong-ngamsub	(Thailand)	2003–2004	2003 V-League – Champions; 2003 Vietnamese Super Cup – Champions; 2004 V-League – Champions
Huỳnh Văn Ảnh	(Vietnam)	2005	2004 Vietnamese Super Cup – Champions; 2005 ASEAN Club Championship – Third place
Arjhan Srong-ngamsub	(Thailand)	2006	
Kiatisuk Senamuang	(Thailand)	2006	
Chatchai Paholpat	(Thailand)	2006–2007	2007 V-League – Third place
Anant Amornkiat	(Thailand)	2008	
Dusit Chalermsan	(Thailand)	2008–2009	
Chatchai Paholpat	(Thailand)	2009	
Dusit Chalermsan	(Thailand)	2009	
Kiatisuk Senamuang	(Thailand)	2010	2010 Vietnamese Cup – Runners-up
Dusit Chalermsan	(Thailand)	2011	
Huỳnh Văn Ảnh	(Vietnam)	2011	
Choi Yun-kyum	(South Korea)	2011–2014	2013 V.League 1 – Third place
Guillaume Graechen	(France)	2015	
Nguyễn Quốc Tuấn	(Vietnam)	2015–2017	
Dương Minh Ninh	(Vietnam)	2017–2019	
Lee Tae-hoon	(South Korea)	2019–2020	
Nguyễn Văn Đàn; Dương Minh Ninh	(Vietnam) (Vietnam)	2020	
Kiatisuk Senamuang	(Thailand)	2020–2024	
Vũ Tiến Thành	(Vietnam)	2024	
Lê Quang Trãi	(Vietnam)	2024–	

== Honours ==
=== National competitions ===
League

- V.League 1
  - Winners: 2003, 2004, 2021
  - Third place: 2007, 2013

Cup

- Vietnamese Super Cup:
  - Winners: 2003, 2004
- Vietnamese Cup
  - Runners-up: 2010
  - Third place: 2014, 2022

=== Other competitions ===
- ASEAN Club Championship:
  - Third place: 2005
- BTV Cup:
  - Winners : 2018
- Quang Trung Emperor's Cup:
  - Winners: 2022
- Four-Team Football Tournament - Thái Nguyên:
  - Winners: 2025
