= 2014 AFF U-19 Youth Championship squads =

The 2014 AFF U-19 Youth Championship was an international football tournament that was held in Vietnam from 5 to 13 September 2014. The 6 national teams involved in the tournament were required to register a squad of 20 players; only players in these squads are eligible to take part in the tournament.

== Group A ==
=== Indonesia ===
Head coach: Indra Sjafri

No.	Pos.	Player	Date of birth (age)	Caps	Goals	Club
1	GK	Rangga Pratama	18 April 1996 (age 30)	0	0	(Football Association of Indonesia) Sriwijaya
3	DF	Eriyanto	12 March 1996 (age 30)	4	0	(Football Association of Indonesia) Persib Bandung
4	DF	Heru Iswanda	15 September 1995 (age 30)	0	0	(Football Association of Indonesia) Taruna Satria
6	DF	Junda Irawan	31 May 1996 (age 30)	0	0	(Football Australia) Brisbane Roar
7	MF	Dio Permana	7 June 1995 (age 31)	2	0	(Football Association of Indonesia) Persekap Pasuruan
8	DF	Eka Dwi Susanto	20 May 1995 (age 31)	0	0	(Football Association of Indonesia) Unknown
9	FW	Angga Febryanto Putra	4 April 1995 (age 31)	0	0	(Football Association of Indonesia) Persib Bandung
10	MF	Alqomar Tehupelasury	16 June 1995 (age 31)	5	1	(Football Association of Indonesia) Nusa Ina
11	MF	Sabeq Fahmi	24 January 1996 (age 30)	0	0	(Football Association of Indonesia) Jember United
12	GK	Dikri Yusron	8 January 1995 (age 31)	0	0	(Football Association of Indonesia) Persib
13	FW	Febri Haryadi	19 February 1996 (age 30)	0	0	(Football Association of Indonesia) Persib Bandung
14	MF	Untung Wibowo	14 March 1996 (age 30)	0	0	(Football Association of Indonesia) Persib Bandung
15	DF	Heri Setiawan	15 September 1995 (age 30)	0	0	(Football Association of Indonesia) PPSM Magelang
16	MF	Ahmad Rajendra	7 December 1995 (age 30)	0	0	(Football Association of Indonesia) Persijap Jepara
17	MF	Djali Ibrahim	15 August 1995 (age 31)	0	0	(Football Association of Indonesia) Persiter Ternate
18	FW	Martinus Novianto	3 November 1995 (age 30)	1	0	(Football Association of Indonesia) PSIM Yogyakarta
19	MF	Makarius Suruan	8 November 1995 (age 30)	0	0	(Football Association of Indonesia) Perseman Manokwari
20	FW	Anang Adi Nugraha	14 March 1995 (age 31)	0	0	(Football Association of Indonesia) Sriwijaya
21	MF	Fahmi Al-Ayyubi	21 December 1995 (age 30)	0	0	(Football Association of Indonesia) Perseba Bangkalan
23	DF	Ahmad Syafari	17 February 1995 (age 31)	0	0	(Football Association of Indonesia) Persib Bandung

=== Myanmar ===
Head coach: (Germany) Gerd Zeise

No.	Pos.	Player	Date of birth (age)	Caps	Goals	Club
1	GK	Myo Min Latt	20 February 1995 (age 31)			(Myanmar Football Federation) Zeyar Shwe Myay
3	DF	Htike Htike Aung	1 February 1995 (age 31)			(Myanmar Football Federation) Ayeyawady United
4	DF	Naing Lin Tun	16 June 1995 (age 31)			(Myanmar Football Federation) Magway
5	DF	Nanda Kyaw	3 September 1996 (age 29)			(Myanmar Football Federation) Magway
6	MF	Kyaw Min Oo	16 June 1996 (age 30)			(Myanmar Football Federation) Ayeyawady United
7	MF	Nyein Chan Aung	18 August 1996 (age 30)			(Myanmar Football Federation) Manaw Myay
8	FW	Maung Maung Soe	6 August 1995 (age 31)			(Myanmar Football Federation) Magway
9	MF	Aung Thu	22 May 1996 (age 30)			(Myanmar Football Federation) Yadanarbon
10	FW	Shine Thura	10 March 1996 (age 30)			(Myanmar Football Federation) Yadanarbon
11	FW	Than Paing	6 December 1996 (age 29)			(Myanmar Football Federation) Yangon United
14	DF	Nan Wai Min	1 January 1995 (age 31)			(Myanmar Football Federation) Yangon United
15	FW	Yan Naing Oo	31 March 1996 (age 30)			(Myanmar Football Federation) Zeyar Shwe Myay
16	MF	Maung Maung Lwin	18 June 1995 (age 31)			(Myanmar Football Federation) Hantharwady United
17	DF	Thiha Htet Aung	13 March 1996 (age 30)			(Myanmar Football Federation) Zeyar Shwe Myay
19	MF	Chit Hla Aung	20 October 1995 (age 30)			(Myanmar Football Federation) Kanbawza
21	MF	Swan Htet Aung	18 September 1995 (age 30)			(Myanmar Football Federation) Yangon United
22	GK	Htet Lin Oo	25 May 1995 (age 31)			(Myanmar Football Federation) Kanbawza
23	DF	Myo Ko Tun	12 March 1995 (age 31)			(Myanmar Football Federation) Yadanarbon
24	MF	Shwe Win Tun	22 January 1995 (age 31)			(Myanmar Football Federation) Nay Pyi Taw
27	MF	Yan Lin Aung	17 August 1996 (age 30)			(Myanmar Football Federation) Yangon United

=== Thailand ===
Head coach: Sasom Pobprasert

No.	Pos.	Player	Date of birth (age)	Caps	Goals	Club
1	GK	Rattanai Songsangchan	10 June 1995 (age 31)			(Football Association of Thailand) Look Isan-Thai Airways
3	DF	Suporn Peenagatapho	12 July 1995 (age 31)			(Football Association of Thailand) Muangthong United
4	DF	Kiattisak Toopkhuntod	19 February 1995 (age 31)			(Football Association of Thailand) Samut Prakan
5	DF	Worawut Namvech	4 July 1995 (age 31)			(Football Association of Thailand) Bangkok Glass
7	DF	Patipan Un-Op	8 October 1995 (age 30)			(Football Association of Thailand) Chonburi
8	DF	Nitipong Sanmahung	4 March 1996 (age 30)			(Football Association of Thailand) Air Force United
9	MF	Supravee Miprathang	19 July 1996 (age 30)			(Football Association of Thailand) Assumption United
12	MF	Chaowat Veerachart	23 June 1996 (age 30)			(Football Association of Thailand) Surin City
14	MF	Patipan Pinsermsootsri	3 October 1996 (age 29)			(Football Association of Thailand) Muangthong United
15	MF	Tanasith Siripala	9 August 1995 (age 31)			(Football Association of Thailand) Bangkok Glass
19	MF	Nopphon Ponkam	19 July 1996 (age 30)			(Football Association of Thailand) BCC Tero
22	GK	Anusit Termmee	19 January 1995 (age 31)			(Football Association of Thailand) Bangkok United
23	FW	Tanadol Jansawang	24 August 1995 (age 31)			(Football Association of Thailand) Kasetsart University
26	DF	Sittichok Kannoo	9 August 1996 (age 30)			(Football Association of Thailand) Buriram United
28	FW	Piyapong Homkhajohn	14 February 1995 (age 31)			(Football Association of Thailand) Surin City
31	DF	Shinnaphat Leeaoh	2 February 1997 (age 29)			(Football Association of Thailand) Muangthong United
32	MF	Sansern Limwattana	30 June 1997 (age 29)			(New Zealand Football) Central United
33	MF	Wuttichai Sooksen	16 September 1995 (age 30)			(Football Association of Thailand) Osotspa M-150 Saraburi
34	MF	Atthawit Sukchuai	13 March 1996 (age 30)			(Football Association of Thailand) Ratchaburi
35	DF	Yossawat Montha	11 November 1995 (age 30)			(Football Association of Thailand) Police United

== Group B ==
=== Australia ===
Head coach: Paul Okon

No.	Pos.	Player	Date of birth (age)	Caps	Goals	Club
1	GK	Anthony Bouzanis	1 November 1995 (age 30)	0	0	(Football Australia) Sydney FC
2	MF	Liam Rose	1 April 1997 (age 29)	2	0	(Football Australia) Central Coast Mariners
4	DF	Shayne D'Cunha	1 April 1996 (age 30)	2	0	(Football Australia) Blacktown City
5	DF	Scott Galloway	10 April 1995 (age 31)	10	0	(Football Australia) Melbourne Victory
7	FW	Brandon Borrello	25 June 1995 (age 31)	3	0	(Football Australia) Brisbane Roar
8	MF	Chris Naumoff	29 June 1995 (age 31)	4	0	(Football Australia) Sydney FC
9	FW	Jaushua Sotirio	11 October 1995 (age 30)	2	0	(Football Australia) Western Sydney Wanderers
10	MF	Stefan Mauk	12 November 1995 (age 30)	6	1	(Football Australia) Melbourne City
11	FW	Peter Skapetis	13 January 1995 (age 31)	2	5	(The Football Association) Stoke City
12	MF	George Blackwood	4 June 1997 (age 29)	0	0	(Football Australia) APIA Leichhardt Tigers
14	MF	Daniel De Silva	6 March 1997 (age 29)	11	2	(Football Australia) Perth Glory
15	MF	Jaiden Walker	5 September 1996 (age 29)	0	0	(Football Australia) Brisbane Roar
16	MF	Jordan Brown	14 August 1996 (age 30)	2	0	(Football Australia) Melbourne Victory
17	DF	Daniel Alessi	26 August 1997 (age 29)	3	0	(Football Australia) Western Sydney Wanderers
18	GK	Jordan Thurtell	1 January 1995 (age 31)	2	0	(Football Australia) Perth Glory
19	MF	Shannon Brady	21 June 1995 (age 31)	2	0	(Football Australia) Brisbane Roar
20	MF	Awer Mabil	15 September 1995 (age 30)	3	4	(Football Australia) Adelaide United
21	DF	Harry Ascroft	1 July 1995 (age 31)	0	0	(Royal Dutch Football Association) VVV-Venlo
22	DF	Ben Warland	1 January 1997 (age 29)	2	0	(Football Australia) Adelaide United
23	DF	Ben Garuccio	15 June 1995 (age 31)	9	0	(Football Australia) Melbourne City

=== Japan ===
Head Coach: Masakazu Suzuki

No.	Pos.	Player	Date of birth (age)	Caps	Goals	Club
1	GK	Kosuke Nakamura	27 February 1995 (age 31)			(Japan Football Association) Kashiwa Reysol
2	DF	So Fujitani	28 October 1997 (age 28)			(Japan Football Association) Vissel Kobe
3	DF	Genta Miura	1 March 1995 (age 31)			(Japan Football Association) Shimizu S-Pulse
4	DF	Yuki Uchiyama	7 May 1995 (age 31)			(Japan Football Association) Consadole Sapporo
7	MF	Keisuke Oyama	7 May 1995 (age 31)			(Japan Football Association) Omiya Ardija
9	FW	Genta Omotehara	28 February 1996 (age 30)			(Japan Football Association) Ehime
11	FW	Yamato Ochi	12 May 1995 (age 31)			(Japan Football Association) Sanno University
15	FW	Shota Kaneko	2 May 1995 (age 31)			(Japan Football Association) Shimizu S-Pulse
16	MF	Masaya Okugawa	14 April 1996 (age 30)			(Japan Football Association) Kyoto Sanga
18	GK	Kenshin Yoshimaru	27 March 1996 (age 30)			(Japan Football Association) Vissel Kobe
19	FW	Koya Kitagawa	26 July 1996 (age 30)			(Japan Football Association) Shimizu S-Pulse
20	MF	Daisuke Sakai	18 January 1997 (age 29)			(Japan Football Association) Oita Trinita
21	MF	Daisuke Takagi	14 October 1995 (age 30)			(Japan Football Association) Tokyo Verdy
24	MF	Yosuke Ideguchi	23 August 1996 (age 30)			(Japan Football Association) Gamba Osaka
25	DF	Rikiya Motegi	27 September 1996 (age 29)			(Japan Football Association) Urawa Red Diamonds
26	MF	Masaomi Nakano	9 April 1996 (age 30)			(Japan Football Association) Tokyo Verdy
27	MF	Akira Ando	28 June 1995 (age 31)			(Japan Football Association) Fukushima United
28	MF	Naoki Ogawa	3 July 1995 (age 31)			(Japan Football Association) Gamba Osaka
31	DF	Ryosuke Shindo	7 June 1996 (age 30)			(Japan Football Association) Consadole Sapporo
32	MF	Taro Sugimoto	28 December 1996 (age 29)			(Japan Football Association) Kashima Antlers

=== Vietnam ===
Head coach: (France) Guillaume Graechen

No.	Pos.	Player	Date of birth (age)	Caps	Goals	Club
1	GK	Lê Văn Trường	25 December 1995 (age 30)			(Vietnam Football Federation) Hoàng Anh Gia Lai
2	DF	Lê Văn Sơn	20 December 1996 (age 29)			(Vietnam Football Federation) Hoàng Anh Gia Lai
3	DF	Trần Hữu Đông Triều	20 August 1995 (age 31)			(Vietnam Football Federation) Hoàng Anh Gia Lai
4	DF	Bùi Tiến Dũng	2 October 1995 (age 30)			(Vietnam Football Federation) Viettel
5	DF	Lục Xuân Hưng	15 April 1995 (age 31)			(Vietnam Football Federation) Thanh Hóa
6	MF	Lương Xuân Trường	28 April 1995 (age 31)			(Vietnam Football Federation) Hoàng Anh Gia Lai
7	DF	Nguyễn Phong Hồng Duy	13 June 1996 (age 30)			(Vietnam Football Federation) Hoàng Anh Gia Lai
8	MF	Nguyễn Tuấn Anh	16 May 1995 (age 31)			(Vietnam Football Federation) Hoàng Anh Gia Lai
9	FW	Nguyễn Văn Toàn	12 April 1996 (age 30)			(Vietnam Football Federation) Hoàng Anh Gia Lai
10	FW	Nguyễn Công Phượng	21 January 1995 (age 31)			(Vietnam Football Federation) Hoàng Anh Gia Lai
11	MF	Phan Thanh Hậu	12 January 1997 (age 29)			(Vietnam Football Federation) Hoàng Anh Gia Lai
12	MF	Phạm Trùm Tỉnh	2 May 1995 (age 31)			(Vietnam Football Federation) Khánh Hòa
13	MF	Trần Minh Vương	28 March 1995 (age 31)			(Vietnam Football Federation) Hoàng Anh Gia Lai
14	MF	Phan Văn Đức	11 April 1996 (age 30)			(Vietnam Football Federation) Sông Lam Nghệ An
15	GK	Trần Minh Toàn	21 January 1996 (age 30)			(Vietnam Football Federation) Tây Ninh
16	DF	Nguyễn Hữu Anh Tài	28 February 1996 (age 30)			(Vietnam Football Federation) Hoàng Anh Gia Lai
17	FW	Hồ Tuấn Tài	15 June 1995 (age 31)			(Vietnam Football Federation) Sông Lam Nghệ An
18	MF	Hoàng Thanh Tùng	19 November 1996 (age 29)			(Vietnam Football Federation) Hoàng Anh Gia Lai
19	MF	Phan Văn Long	1 June 1996 (age 30)			(Vietnam Football Federation) SHB Đà Nẵng
20	DF	Trần Anh Thi	14 February 1996 (age 30)			(Vietnam Football Federation) Tây Ninh
23	MF	Nguyễn Quang Hải	12 April 1997 (age 29)			(Vietnam Football Federation) Hà Nội T&T
