= Lê Văn Trường =

Vietnamese footballer (born 1995)

Personal information
- Full name: Lê Văn Trường
- Date of birth: 25 December 1995 (age 30)
- Place of birth: Phúc Yên, Vĩnh Phúc, Vietnam
- Height: 1.80 m (5 ft 11 in)
- Position: Goalkeeper

Team information
- Current team: LPBank Ho Chi Minh City
- Number: 1

Youth career
- 2007–2014: HAGL – Arsenal JMG Academy

Senior career*
Years	Team	Apps	(Gls)
2015–2022	Hoàng Anh Gia Lai	25	(0)
2023	Khánh Hòa	4	(0)
2024	LPBank Ho Chi Minh City		

International career
2013–2014	Vietnam U19	24	(0)
2016–2017	Vietnam U22	5	(0)
- * Club domestic league appearances and goals as of 5 January 2022

Lê Văn Trường (born 25 December 1995) is a Vietnamese footballer who plays as a goalkeeper for LPBank Ho Chi Minh City.

== Honours ==
Vietnam U19

- AFF U-19 Youth Championship: Runner-up 2013, 2014
- Hassanal Bolkiah Trophy: Runner-up 2014
