= Permana =

Permana is an Indonesian surname. Notable people with the surname include:

- Dio Permana (born 1995), Indonesian football player
- Lenny Permana (born 1975), Indonesian badminton player
