= 2012 AFF U-16 Youth Championship =

Tournament details
- Host country: Laos
- City: Vientiane
- Dates: 2–8 June
- Teams: 4 (from 1 confederation)
- Venue: 1 (in 1 host city)

Final positions
- Champions: Japan (1st title)
- Runners-up: Australia
- Third place: Laos
- Fourth place: Thailand

Tournament statistics
- Matches played: 8
- Goals scored: 27 (3.38 per match)
- Top scorer: (Japan) Ryoma Watanabe (3)

The 2012 AFF U-16 Youth Championship is an international football tournament that was held from 2 to 8 June 2012, hosted by Laos for the second time.

This year's edition will feature four nations. Laos and Thailand representing the AFF and guests Australia and Japan who are invited as all four nations have qualified for the 2012 AFC U-16 Championship to be played later in the year. All four teams will play in a round robin group with the top two meeting in a final and the bottom two playing off for 3rd place.

== Standings & Results ==
=== Group stage ===
Team	Pld	W	D	L	GF	GA	GD	Pts
Japan	3	2	1	0	7	1	+6	7
Australia	3	2	1	0	8	5	+3	7
Laos	3	1	0	2	3	6	−3	3
Thailand	3	0	0	3	2	8	−6	0

2 June 2012
16:00

Australia	1 – 1	Japan
Iredale 49'	Report	Miyoshi 44'

New Laos National Stadium, Vientiane
Referee: Mohamed Yazeen Buhari (Singapore)
2 June 2012
19:00

Laos	1 – 0	Thailand
Kettavong 59'	Report

New Laos National Stadium, Vientiane

4 June 2012
16:00

Japan	3 – 0	Thailand
Watanabe 2' 45'; Aoyama 65'	Report

New Laos National Stadium, Vientiane
Referee: Steve Supresencia (Philippines)
4 June 2012
19:00

Laos	2 – 3	Australia
Kettavong 50'; Dalavong 81'	Report	Lap 62'; McDonald 72'; Calver 88'

New Laos National Stadium, Vientiane

6 June 2012
16:00

Australia	4 – 2	Thailand
Warland 10'; Hanna 15'; Lap 21'; De Silva 87'	Report	Miprathang 27'; Sitthichok 65'

New Laos National Stadium, Vientiane
6 June 2012
19:00

Laos	0 – 3	Japan
	Report	Sugimori 80'; Watanabe 84'; Kawata 90'

New Laos National Stadium, Vientiane
Referee: Mohamed Yazeen Buhari (Singapore)

=== Third place play-off ===
8 June 2012
16:00

Thailand	0 – 3	Laos
	Report	Tonglim 75'; Thammada 90+1'; Sandala 90+5'

New Laos National Stadium, Vientiane
Referee: Steve Supresencia (Philippines)

=== Final ===
8 June 2012
19:00

Australia	1 – 3	Japan
De Silva 8'	Report	Miyamoto 17'; Kawata 80'; Miyoshi 90+2'

New Laos National Stadium, Vientiane
Referee: Yazeen Buhari (Singapore)

== Winner ==
2012 AFF U-16 Youth Championship winners

Japan
First title

== Goalscorers ==
3 goals

- (Japan) Ryoma Watanabe

2 goals

- (Australia) Kevin Lap
- (Australia) Daniel De Silva
- (Japan) Kento Kawata
- (Japan) Koji Miyoshi
- (Laos) Armysay Kettavong

1 goal

- (Australia) Aaron Calver
- (Australia) Lawrence Hanna
- (Australia) Jack Iredale
- (Australia) Benjamin Warland
- (Australia) Joshua McDonald
- (Japan) Hiroaki Aoyama
- (Japan) Kota Miyamoto
- (Japan) Koki Sugimori
- (Laos) Sisawad Dalavong
- (Laos) Southavone Thammada
- (Laos) Jo Sandala
- (Thailand) Supravee Miprathang
- (Thailand) Sittichok Kannoo

Own goal

- (Thailand) Jutitep Tonglim (For Laos)
