= 2013 AFF U-19 Youth Championship =

Kejuaraan Remaja U-19 AFF 2013

Tournament details
- Host country: Indonesia
- Cities: Sidoarjo; Gresik
- Dates: 9–22 September
- Teams: 11 (from 1 confederation)
- Venues: 2 (in 2 host cities)

Final positions
- Champions: Indonesia (1st title)
- Runners-up: Vietnam
- Third place: Timor-Leste
- Fourth place: Laos

Tournament statistics
- Matches played: 29
- Goals scored: 113 (3.9 per match)
- Top scorer(s): (Vietnam) Nguyễn Văn Toàn (6 goals)

The 2013 AFF U-19 Youth Championship was held from 9 to 22 September 2013, hosted by Indonesia. 11 members of the ASEAN Football Federation were divided into two groups.

Australia, originally drawn in Group A, withdrew on 8 September 2013, citing lack of preparations. Indonesia won the tournament after defeating unbeaten team, Vietnam, through a penalty shoot-out. This was also their first title since the tournament was held in 2002.

== Venues ==
| Sidoarjo | Gresik |
|---|---|
| Gelora Delta Stadium | Petrokimia Stadium |
| Capacity: 35,000 | Capacity: 25,000 |

== Standings and results ==
All times are local (UTC+07:00)

=== Group A ===
| Team | Pld | W | D | L | GF | GA | GD | Pts |
|---|---|---|---|---|---|---|---|---|
| Timor-Leste | 4 | 3 | 1 | 0 | 9 | 4 | +5 | 10 |
| Laos | 4 | 3 | 0 | 1 | 10 | 5 | +5 | 9 |
| Cambodia | 4 | 2 | 0 | 2 | 9 | 9 | 0 | 6 |
| Singapore | 4 | 1 | 1 | 2 | 6 | 8 | −2 | 4 |
| Philippines | 4 | 0 | 0 | 4 | 4 | 12 | −8 | 0 |

9 September 2013
15:30

| Laos | 3 – 1 | Philippines |
|---|---|---|
| Natphasouk 26', 84'; Somsanith 69' | Report | Amita 57' (pen.) |

Gelora Delta Stadium, Sidoarjo
Referee: Hla Min (Myanmar)
9 September 2013
19:30

| Singapore | 1 – 1 | Timor-Leste |
|---|---|---|
| Hazim 26' (pen.) | Report | Gusmao 2' |

Gelora Delta Stadium, Sidoarjo
Referee: Mongkolchai Pechsri (Thailand)

11 September 2013
15:30

| Singapore | 3 – 1 | Philippines |
|---|---|---|
| Mahathir 29'; Lightfoot 44'; Hazim 74' | Report | Benedicto 90+3' |

Gelora Delta Stadium, Sidoarjo
Referee: Mongkolchai Pechsri (Thailand)
11 September 2013
19:30

| Cambodia | 1 – 3 | Laos |
|---|---|---|
| Bottroi 78' | Report | Saysana 41', 70'; Sipasong 53' |

Gelora Delta Stadium, Sidoarjo
Referee: Hadimin Shahbuddin (Brunei)

13 September 2013
15:30

| Cambodia | 1 – 3 | Timor-Leste |
|---|---|---|
| Phallin 53' | Report | Adelino 58', 76'; Alves 80' |

Gelora Delta Stadium, Sidoarjo
Referee: Mohd Amirul Izwan Yaacob (Malaysia)
13 September 2013
19:30

| Laos | 3 – 0 | Singapore |
|---|---|---|
| Kongmathilath 7'; Kettavong 43', 90+1' | Report |

Gelora Delta Stadium, Sidoarjo
Referee: Hla Min (Myanmar)

15 September 2013
15:30

| Timor-Leste | 3 – 1 | Laos |
|---|---|---|
| Alves 70', 83'; Januario 90+1' | Report | Saysana 36' (pen.) |

Petrokimia Stadium, Gresik
Referee: Sivakorn Pu-Udom (Thailand)
15 September 2013
19:30

| Philippines | 1 – 4 | Cambodia |
|---|---|---|
| Benedicto 27' | Report | Makara 50'; Tola 60'; Bottroi 81'; Samnang 87' |

Petrokimia Stadium, Gresik
Referee: Mongkolchai Pechsri (Thailand)

17 September 2013
15:30

| Cambodia | 3 – 2 | Singapore |
|---|---|---|
| Tola 49', 83'; Veasna 81' | Report | Muhelmy 57'; Hazim 75' (pen.) |

Petrokimia Stadium, Gresik
Referee: Hla Min (Myanmar)
17 September 2013
19:30

| Philippines | 1 – 2 | Timor-Leste |
|---|---|---|
| Bautista 51' | Report | Magno 26'; Almeida 44' |

Gelora Delta Stadium, Sidoarjo
Referee: Mohd Amirul Izwan Yaacob (Malaysia)

=== Group B ===
| Team | Pld | W | D | L | GF | GA | GD | Pts |
|---|---|---|---|---|---|---|---|---|
| Vietnam | 5 | 5 | 0 | 0 | 15 | 5 | +10 | 15 |
| Indonesia | 5 | 3 | 1 | 1 | 12 | 5 | +7 | 10 |
| Malaysia | 5 | 2 | 2 | 1 | 9 | 4 | +5 | 8 |
| Myanmar | 5 | 1 | 2 | 2 | 13 | 10 | +3 | 5 |
| Thailand | 5 | 1 | 1 | 3 | 16 | 12 | +4 | 4 |
| Brunei | 5 | 0 | 0 | 5 | 1 | 30 | −29 | 0 |

10 September 2013
15:30

| Vietnam | 3 – 2 | Thailand |
|---|---|---|
| Nguyễn Công Phượng 12'; Nguyễn Văn Toàn 15', 44' | Report | Buran 2'; Miprathang 85' |

Petrokimia Stadium, Gresik
Referee: Hadimin Shahbuddin (Brunei)
10 September 2013
19:30

| Indonesia | 5 – 0 | Brunei |
|---|---|---|
| Ilham 12', 30'; Alqomar 27'; Muchlis 62', 85' | Report |

Gelora Delta Stadium, Sidoarjo
Referee: Mohd Amirul Izwan Yaacob (Malaysia)
10 September 2013
19:30

| Malaysia | 1 – 1 | Myanmar |
|---|---|---|
| Jafri 88' | Report | Maung Maung Soe 40' |

Petrokimia Stadium, Gresik
Referee: Sivakorn Pu-Udom (Thailand)

12 September 2013
15:30

| Vietnam | 1 – 0 | Malaysia |
|---|---|---|
| Nguyễn Phong Hồng Duy 79' | Report |

Gelora Delta Stadium, Sidoarjo
Referee: Xaypaseuth Phonsanit (Laos)
12 September 2013
19:30

| Myanmar | 1 – 2 | Indonesia |
|---|---|---|
| Nyein Chan Aung 17' | Report | Evan 6'; Putu 16' |

Petrokimia Stadium, Gresik
Referee: Steve Supresencia (Philippines)
12 September 2013
19:30

| Thailand | 8 – 0 | Brunei |
|---|---|---|
| Miprathang 1'; Phunklai 12'; Samphodi 37'; Jeentanorm 45' (pen.), 47'; Buran 74'; Sukchuai 78'; Thawornsak 88' | Report |

Petrokimia Stadium, Gresik
Referee: Vichhika Tuy (Cambodia)

14 September 2013
15:30

| Brunei | 0 – 6 | Myanmar |
|---|---|---|
| | Report | Aung Thu 4', 71'; Naung Naung Latt 35'; Si Thu Aung 45+1'; Nyein Chan Aung 59'; Maung Maung Soe 79' |

Petrokimia Stadium, Gresik
Referee: Virak Khuon (Cambodia)
14 September 2013
19:30

| Thailand | 1 – 2 | Malaysia |
|---|---|---|
| Homkhajon 51' | Report | Arif 14'; Alif 74' |

Gelora Delta Stadium, Sidoarjo
Referee: Steve Supresencia(Philippines)
14 September 2013
19:30

| Indonesia | 1 – 2 | Vietnam |
|---|---|---|
| Evan 1' | Report | Phạm Đức Huy 31'; Nguyễn Văn Toàn 35' |

Petrokimia Stadium, Gresik
Referee: Xaypaseuth Phonsanit (Laos)

16 September 2013
15:30

| Myanmar | 1 – 3 | Vietnam |
|---|---|---|
| Saw Si I 65' | Report | Nguyễn Văn Toàn 15', 41', 90+3' |

Petrokimia Stadium, Gresik
Referee: Vichhika Tuy (Cambodia)
16 September 2013
15:30

| Malaysia | 5 – 0 | Brunei |
|---|---|---|
| Thanabalan 8'; Arif 23' (pen.), 38'; Shamie 24'; Jafri 78' | Report |

Gelora Delta Stadium, Sidoarjo
Referee: Virak Khuon (Cambodia)
16 September 2013
19:30

| Indonesia | 3 – 1 | Thailand |
|---|---|---|
| Evan 15', 76', 90+4' (pen.) | Report | Phunklai 45+3' |

Gelora Delta Stadium, Sidoarjo
Referee: Steve Supresencia (Philippines)

18 September 2013
15:30

| Thailand | 4 – 4 | Myanmar |
|---|---|---|
| Veerachat 36'; Jansawang 44', 62', 67' | Report | Yan Naing Oo 2', 87'; Nyein Chan Aung 23'; Than Paing 29' |

Gelora Delta Stadium, Sidoarjo
Referee: Vichhika Tuy (Cambodia)
18 September 2013
19:30

| Brunei | 1 – 6 | Vietnam |
|---|---|---|
| Faiq 70' | Report | Trương Văn Thiết 7' (pen.); Phạm Trùm Tỉnh 34', 86'; Nguyễn Minh Thái 42'; Phan Thanh Hậu 47'; Lâm Ti Phông 58' |

Petrokimia Stadium, Gresik
Referee: Virak Khuon (Cambodia)
18 September 2013
19:30

| Indonesia | 1 – 1 | Malaysia |
|---|---|---|
| Ilham 53' | Report | Jafri 19' |

Gelora Delta Stadium, Sidoarjo
Referee: Steve Supresencia (Philippines)

== Knockout stage ==
Semi-finals
20 September 2013 – Gresik
Timor-Leste | 0
Indonesia | 2
20 September 2013 – Sidoarjo
Vietnam | 1
Laos | 0

Final
22 September 2013 – Sidoarjo
Indonesia | 0 (7)
Vietnam | 0 (6)
Third place
22 September 2013 – Sidoarjo
Laos | 2
Timor-Leste | 4

=== Semi-finals ===
20 September 2013
20:00

| Timor-Leste | 0 – 2 | Indonesia |
|---|---|---|
| | Report | Ilham 9'; Hargianto 60' |

Gelora Delta Stadium, Sidoarjo
Referee: Hadimin Shahbuddin (Brunei)
20 September 2013
16:00

| Vietnam | 1 – 0 | Laos |
|---|---|---|
| Nguyễn Công Phượng 75' | Report |

Petrokimia Stadium, Gresik
Referee: Steve Supresencia (Philippines)

=== Third place play-off ===
22 September 2013
16:00

| Laos | 2 – 4 | Timor-Leste |
|---|---|---|
| Kongmathilath 29'; Somsanith 68' | Report | Adelino 45', 45+1', 58'; Nataniel 69' |

Gelora Delta Stadium, Sidoarjo
Referee: Vichhika Tuy (Cambodia)

=== Final ===
22 September 2013
20:00

| Indonesia | 0 – 0 (a.e.t.) | Vietnam |
|---|---|---|
| | Report |
Penalties
| Fatchurohman (penalty scored); Evan (penalty missed); Zulfiandi (penalty missed); Drajad (penalty scored); Hendra (penalty scored); Hansamu (penalty scored); Putu (penalty scored); Maldini (penalty scored); Ilham (penalty scored) | 7 – 6 | (penalty scored) Lê Văn Sơn; (penalty missed) Trần Hữu Đông Triều; (penalty scored) Hoàng Thanh Tùng; (penalty missed) Nguyễn Tuấn Anh; (penalty scored) Lâm Ti Phông; (penalty scored) Nguyễn Hữu Anh Tài; (penalty scored) Phan Thanh Hậu; (penalty scored) Nguyễn Văn Toàn; (penalty missed) Phạm Đức Huy |

Gelora Delta Stadium, Sidoarjo
Referee: Sivakorn Pu-Udom (Thailand)

== Winner ==
2013 AFF U-19 Youth Championship Winners
(Indonesia)
Indonesia
First title

== Goalscorers ==
6 goals

- (Vietnam) Nguyễn Văn Toàn

5 goals

- (Indonesia) Evan Dimas Darmono
- (Timor-Leste) Adelino Trindade

4 goals

- (Indonesia) Ilham Armaiyn

3 goals

- (Cambodia) Nub Tola
- (Laos) Lembo Saysana
- (Malaysia) Mohd Arif Mohd Anwar
- (Malaysia) Muhammad Jafri
- (Myanmar) Nyein Chan Aung
- (Singapore) Mohd Hazim
- (Thailand) Tanadol Jansawang
- (Timor-Leste) Frangcyatma Alves

2 goals

- (Cambodia) Va Bottroi
- (Indonesia) Muchlis Hadi
- (Laos) Phithack Kongmathilath
- (Laos) Soukchinda Natphasouk
- (Laos) Souksavanh Somsanith
- (Myanmar) Aung Thu
- (Myanmar) Maung Maung Soe
- (Myanmar) Yan Naing Oo
- (Philippines) Nikko Benedicto
- (Thailand) Chaiyawat Buran
- (Thailand) Kullachat Jeentanorm
- (Thailand) Ratchanon Phunklai
- (Thailand) Supravee Miprathang
- (Vietnam) Nguyen Cong Phuong
- (Vietnam) Pham Trum Tinh

1 goal

- (Brunei) Faiq Jefri Bolkiah
- (Cambodia) Hoy Phallin
- (Cambodia) Moung Makara
- (Cambodia) Neth Veasna
- (Cambodia) Sok Samnang
- (Indonesia) Al-Qomar Tehupelasury
- (Indonesia) Muhammad Hargianto
- (Indonesia) Putu Gede Juni Antara
- (Laos) Armisay Kettavong
- (Laos) Bounthavy Sipasong
- (Malaysia) Mohd Alif Haikal
- (Malaysia) Nur Shamie
- (Malaysia) Thanabalan Nadarajah
- (Myanmar) Naung Naung Latt
- (Myanmar) Saw Si I
- (Myanmar) Si Thu Aung
- (Myanmar) Than Paing
- (Philippines) Arnel Amita
- (Philippines) Junell Bautista
- (Singapore) Jeffrey Lightfoot
- (Singapore) Mahathir Azman
- (Singapore) Muhammad Muhelmy
- (Thailand) Atthawit Sukchuai
- (Thailand) Chaowat Veerachart
- (Thailand) Chenrop Samphodi
- (Thailand) Kandanai Thawornsak
- (Thailand) Piyapong Homkhajon
- (Timor-Leste) Carlos Magno
- (Timor-Leste) Januario Jesus
- (Timor-Leste) Jose Almeida
- (Timor-Leste) Marcos Gusmao
- (Timor-Leste) Nataniel Reis
- (Vietnam) Lam Ti Phong
- (Vietnam) Nguyen Minh Thai
- (Vietnam) Nguyen Phong Hong Duy
- (Vietnam) Pham Duc Huy
- (Vietnam) Phan Thanh Hau
- (Vietnam) Truong Van Thiet
