= Maldini Pali =

Indonesian footballer

Personal information
- Full name: Maldini Pali
- Date of birth: 27 January 1995 (age 31)
- Place of birth: Mamuju, Indonesia
- Height: 1.77 m (5 ft 10 in)
- Position: Winger

Team information
- Current team: Persibas Banyumas
- Number: 15

Youth career
- SSB Hasanuddin Makassar
- 2010: Indonesia Football Academy
- 2011: Leicester City
- 2011: Villa 2000
- 2012–2013: Deportivo Indonesia

Senior career*
Years	Team	Apps	(Gls)
2013–2016	PSM Makassar	12	(1)
2017	Sriwijaya	7	(1)
2017	Persiba Balikpapan	11	(0)
2018	Bhayangkara	6	(0)
2019–2021	Kalteng Putra	12	(0)
2024–2025	Persewangi Banyuwangi	0	(0)
2025–	Persibas Banyumas	7	(0)

International career
2010–2013	Indonesia U16	6	(1)
2013–2014	Indonesia U19	23	(1)
Medal record
Men's football
Representing Indonesia
AFF U-19 Youth Championship
Winner	2013 Indonesia
- * Club domestic league appearances and goals as of 4 February 2026

Maldini Pali (born 27 January 1995) is an Indonesian professional footballer who plays as a winger for Liga 4 club Persibas Banyumas.

== International career ==
In 2010, Maldini represented the Indonesia U-16, in the 2010 AFC U-16 Championship. And in 2014 Maldini represented the Indonesia U-19, in the 2014 AFC U-19 Championship.

== Personal life ==
He is a graduate of Yogyakarta State University (UNY), the Faculty of Sports Science with a concentration in sports coaching education.

== Honours ==
=== Club ===
Persewangi Banyuwangi

- Liga 4 East Java: 2024–25

=== International ===
Indonesia U19

- AFF U-19 Youth Championship: 2013
