= Piyapong Homkhajohn =

Thai footballer (born 1995)

Personal information
- Full name: Piyapong Homkhajohn
- Date of birth: 14 February 1995 (age 31)
- Place of birth: Buriram, Thailand
- Height: 1.70 m (5 ft 7 in)
- Position: Attacking midfielder

Youth career
- 2011–2013: Buriram United

Senior career*
Years	Team	Apps	(Gls)
2014–2015	Buriram United	0	(0)
2014	→ Surin City (loan)	12	(4)
2015	→ Phichit (loan)	17	(1)
2015–2017	Ubon UMT United	18	(5)
2017	→ Yasothon (loan)	12	(3)
2017–2021	Sukhothai	4	(1)
2018	→ Rayong (loan)	6	(1)
2019	→ North Bangkok University (loan)	22	(0)
2020–2021	Muangkan United	0	(0)
2020–2021	→ Singha Golden Bells Kanchanaburi (loan)	5	(1)
2021–2022	North Bangkok University	22	(0)
2022	Ubon Kruanapat	11	(1)
2023	Kongkrailas United	9	(0)

International career
2013–2014	Thailand U19	5	(1)
- * Club domestic league appearances and goals as of 18 March 2023

Piyapong Homkhajohn (Thai: ปิยพงษ์ หอมขจร, born February 14, 1995), simply known as Pong (Thai: พงษ์), is a Thai professional footballer who plays as an attacking midfielder.

== International goals ==
=== Under-19 ===
No.	Date	Venue	Opponent	Score	Result	Competition
1.	14 September 2013	Gelora Delta Stadium, Sidoarjo Regency, Indonesia	Malaysia	1–1	1–2	2013 AFF U-19 Youth Championship
2.	5 September 2014	Mỹ Đình National Stadium, Hanoi, Vietnam	Indonesia	6–2	6–2	2014 AFF U-19 Youth Championship

== Honours ==
Ubon UMT United

- Regional League Division 2: 2015
