= 2011 AFF U-16 Youth Championship =

Tournament details
- Host country: Laos
- City: Vientiane
- Dates: 7–20 July
- Teams: 10 (from 1 confederation)
- Venues: 2 (in 1 host city)

Final positions
- Champions: Thailand (2nd title)
- Runners-up: Laos
- Third place: Myanmar
- Fourth place: Singapore

Tournament statistics
- Matches played: 24
- Goals scored: 77 (3.21 per match)
- Top scorer(s): (Singapore) Adam Swandi (5 goals)

The 2011 AFF U-16 Youth Championship was an international football tournament that was held from 7 to 20 July 2011, hosted by Laos for the first time.

== Group stage ==
- All times are Indochina Time (ICT) – UTC+7.

=== Group A ===
Team	Pld	W	D	L	GF	GA	GD	Pts
Thailand	4	2	2	0	11	4	+7	8
Laos	4	2	2	0	6	2	+4	8
Malaysia	4	1	3	0	7	5	+2	6
Indonesia	4	0	2	2	4	8	−4	2
Timor-Leste	4	0	1	3	5	14	−9	1

7 July 2011
17:00

Indonesia	3 – 3	Timor-Leste
Hargianto 64'; Zalnando 78'; Rendi 90'	Report	Januário 2'; J. Alves 33'; Santos 79'

New Laos National Stadium, Vientiane
7 July 2011
19:00

Malaysia	2 – 2	Thailand
Amirul S. 30'; Hakimi 70'	Report	Supravee 22'; Amirul H. 90' (o.g.)

New Laos National Stadium, Vientiane

9 July 2011
17:00

Indonesia	1 – 1	Malaysia
Indra 40'	Report	Adam Nor 49'

New Laos National Stadium, Vientiane
Referee: Hoàng Anh Tuấn (Vietnam)
9 July 2011
19:00

Timor-Leste	0 – 2	Laos
	Report	Anousay 50'; Sounthavone 70'

New Laos National Stadium, Vientiane
Attendance: 10,000
Referee: U Win Htut (Myanmar)

11 July 2011
17:00

Thailand	6 – 1	Timor-Leste
Sittichok 20', 38'; Suchanon 40'; Atthawit 42', 64'; Chavarit 84'	Report	Agostinho 75' (pen.)

New Laos National Stadium, Vientiane
Referee: Hoàng Anh Tuấn (Vietnam)
11 July 2011
19:00

Laos	2 – 0	Indonesia
Anousay 38'; Sonevilay 69' (pen.)	Report

New Laos National Stadium, Vientiane
Attendance: 10,000
Referee: Sukhbir Singh (Singapore)

13 July 2011
17:00

Indonesia	0 – 2	Thailand
	Report	Nattawut 2'; Chaowat 67'

New Laos National Stadium, Vientiane
Referee: Hoàng Anh Tuấn (Vietnam)
13 July 2011
19:00

Malaysia	1 – 1	Laos
Adam Nor 72'	Report	Sisawad 42'

New Laos National Stadium, Vientiane
Referee: U Win Htut (Myanmar)

15 July 2011
17:00

Thailand	1 – 1	Laos
Saran 5'	Report	Armisay 87'

New Laos National Stadium, Vientiane
Referee: Sukhbir Singh (Singapore)
15 July 2011
17:00

Timor-Leste	1 – 3	Malaysia
F. Alves 49'	Report	Akram 11'; Adam Nor 34'; Zahin 70'

Laos National Stadium, Vientiane
Referee: Hoang Anh Tuan (Vietnam)

=== Group B ===
Team	Pld	W	D	L	GF	GA	GD	Pts
Myanmar	4	3	1	0	8	4	+4	10
Singapore	4	3	0	1	15	2	+13	9
Vietnam	4	2	0	2	15	9	+6	6
Cambodia	4	1	1	2	4	10	−6	4
Philippines	4	0	0	4	2	19	−17	0

8 July 2011
17:00

Philippines	1 – 2	Cambodia
Fegidero 11'	Report	Nub Tola 7', 20'

New Laos National Stadium, Vientiane
Referee: Mongkolchai Pechsri (Thailand)
8 July 2011
19:00

Singapore	5 – 0	Vietnam
Adam 17', 70'; Azhar 28'; Sadik 39'; Faridzuan 87'	Report

New Laos National Stadium, Vientiane
Referee: Suhaizi Shukri (Malaysia)

10 July 2011
17:00

Cambodia	1 – 1	Myanmar
Hoy Phallin 37'	Report	Aung Myat Soe 32'

New Laos National Stadium, Vientiane
Referee: Suhaizi Shukri (Malaysia)
10 July 2011
19:00

Philippines	0 – 5	Singapore
	Report	Sadik 22'; Aaravin 40'; Zulfadhmi 54'; Adam 58'; Mahathir 85'

New Laos National Stadium, Vientiane
Referee: Sipaseuth Sinbandith (Laos)

12 July 2011
17:00

Myanmar	2 – 1	Philippines
Aung Thu 3'; Wai Hin Tun 19'	Report	Caballero 21'

New Laos National Stadium, Vientiane
Referee: Mongkolchai Pechsri (Thailand)
12 July 2011
19:00

Vietnam	4 – 1	Cambodia
Việt Hưng 30', 89'; Quang Hải 59'; Duy Mạnh 83'	Report	Firo Fi In 34'

New Laos National Stadium, Vientiane
Referee: Sipaseuth Sinbandith (Laos)

14 July 2011
17:00

Singapore	1 – 2	Myanmar
Muhelmy 90'	Report	Wai Hin Tun 17'; Aung Myat Soe 23'

New Laos National Stadium, Vientiane
Referee: Mongkolchai Pechsri (Thailand)
14 July 2011
19:00

Philippines	0 – 10	Vietnam
	Report	Duy Mạnh 5', 62', 64'; Quang Khánh 25', 58'; Y Thuyn 68', 77', 80'; Việt Hưng 86'; Xuân Hòa 90'

New Laos National Stadium, Vientiane
Referee: Suhaizi Shukri (Malaysia)

16 July 2011
17:00

Cambodia	0 – 4	Singapore
	Report	Khairuddin 8'; Azhar 34', 76'; Adam 38'

Laos National Stadium, Vientiane
Referee: Sipaseuth Sinbandith (Laos)
16 July 2011
17:00

Vietnam	1 – 3	Myanmar
Việt Hưng 25'	Report	Wai Hin Tun 11'; Aung Thu 15'; Aung Myat Soe 65'

New Laos National Stadium, Vientiane
Referee: Mongkolchai Pechsri (Thailand)

== Knockout stage ==
- All times are Indochina Time (ICT) – UTC+7.

=== Bracket ===
Semi-finals
18 July – Vientiane
Thailand	2
Singapore	0
18 July – Vientiane
Myanmar	0
Laos	1

Final
20 July – Vientiane
Thailand	1
Laos	0
Third place
20 July – Vientiane
Singapore	1
Myanmar	2

=== Semi-finals ===
18 July 2011
17:00

Thailand	2 – 0	Singapore
Saran 62', 70'	Report

New Laos National Stadium, Vientiane
Referee: Hoang Anh Tuan (Vietnam)
18 July 2011
19:00

Myanmar	0 – 1	Laos
	Report	Armisay 29'

New Laos National Stadium, Vientiane
Referee: Suhaizi Shukri (Malaysia)

=== Third place play-off ===
20 July 2011
17:00

Myanmar	2 – 1	Singapore
Phoe La Pyae 50'; Wai Hin Tun 62'	Report	Adam 35'

New Laos National Stadium, Vientiane
Referee: Sipaseuth Sinbandith (Laos)

=== Final ===
20 July 2011
19:00

Thailand	1 – 0	Laos
Suchanon 5'	Report

New Laos National Stadium, Vientiane
Attendance: 30,000
Referee: Sukhbir Singh (Singapore)

== Winner ==
2011 AFF U-16 Youth Championship winners

Thailand
Second title

== Goalscorers ==
5 goals

- (Singapore) Adam Swandi

4 goals

- (Vietnam) Đỗ Duy Mạnh
- (Vietnam) Triệu Việt Hưng

3 goals

- (Malaysia) Adam Nor Azlin
- (Myanmar) Wai Hin Tun
- (Thailand) Saran Puangbut
- (Vietnam) Y Thuyn Mlô

2 goals

- (Cambodia) Nub Tola
- (Laos) Anousay Nyavong
- (Myanmar) Aung Myat Soe
- (Myanmar) Aung Thu
- (Singapore) Azhar Ramli
- (Singapore) Sadik Said
- (Thailand) Sittichok Kannoo
- (Thailand) Suchanon Malison
- (Thailand) Atthawit Sukchuai

1 goal

- (Cambodia) Hoy Phallin
- (Cambodia) Firo Fi In
- (Indonesia) Muhammad Hargianto
- (Indonesia) Indra Kelana
- (Indonesia) Zalnando
- (Indonesia) Rendi Refsanyami
- (Laos) Sisawad Dalavong
- (Laos) Armisay Kettavong
- (Laos) Sonevilay Sihavong
- (Laos) Sounthavone Thammada
- (Malaysia) Akram Asidi
- (Malaysia) Amirul Syafieq
- (Malaysia) Hakimi Hussain
- (Malaysia) Zahin Zainal
- (Myanmar) Phoe La Pyae
- (Philippines) Yves Caballero
- (Philippines) Ryu Fegidero
- (Singapore) R. Aaravin
- (Singapore) Khairuddin Omar
- (Singapore) Mahathir Azeman
- (Singapore) Muhelmy Suhaimi
- (Singapore) Noor Faridzuan Fuad
- (Singapore) Zulfadhmi Suzliman
- (Thailand) Chavarit Buntee
- (Thailand) Supravee Miprathang
- (Thailand) Nattawut Sombatyotha
- (Thailand) Chaowat Veerachat
- (Timor-Leste) Agostinho da Silva Araújo
- (Timor-Leste) Francyatma Alves
- (Timor-Leste) Januário de Jesus
- (Timor-Leste) Jorge Alves
- (Timor-Leste) José Santos
- (Vietnam) Huỳnh Quang Khánh
- (Vietnam) Lê Xuân Hòa
- (Vietnam) Nguyễn Quang Hải

Own goal

- (Malaysia) Amirul Hafizul Samsol (For Thailand)
