= Makarius Suruan =

Indonesian association football player

Personal information
- Full name: Makarius Fredik Suruan
- Date of birth: 8 April 1995 (age 31)
- Place of birth: Manokwari, Indonesia
- Height: 1.72 m (5 ft 8 in)
- Positions: Defensive midfielder; right-back

Senior career*
Years	Team	Apps	(Gls)
2014–2015	Persewon Wondama	12	(0)
2017–2018	Perseru Serui	43	(0)
2019–2021	Borneo	23	(0)
2021	RANS Cilegon	3	(0)
2022–2023	Persewar Waropen	3	(0)
2023–2024	Persipura Jayapura	5	(0)
2025	Académica	8	(0)

International career
2014	Indonesia U19	2	(0)
- * Club domestic league appearances and goals as of 10 December 2023

Makarius Fredik Suruan (born 8 April 1995), is an Indonesian professional footballer who plays as a defensive midfielder or right-back.

== Club career ==
=== Perseru Serui ===
In 2017, Makarius signed a year contract with Indonesian Liga 1 club Perseru Serui. He made his league debut on 3 September 2017 in a match against Barito Putera at the Marora Stadium, Yapen.

=== Borneo ===
He was signed for Borneo to play in Liga 1 in the 2019 season. Makarius made his league debut on 3 July 2019 in a match against Kalteng Putra at the Tuah Pahoe Stadium, Palangkaraya.

=== RANS Cilegon ===
In 2021, Makarius signed a contract with Indonesian Liga 2 club RANS Cilegon. He made his league debut on 28 September against Dewa United at the Gelora Bung Karno Madya Stadium, Jakarta.

== International career ==
In 2014, Makarius represented the Indonesia U-19, in the 2014 AFF U-19 Youth Championship.

== Career statistics ==
=== Club ===
As of match played 10 December 2023

Club	Season	League			Cup (Note: Includes Piala Indonesia)		Continental		Other		Total	
Club	Season	Division	Apps	Goals	Apps	Goals	Apps	Goals	Apps	Goals	Apps	Goals
Persewon Wondama	2014	Premier Division	12	0	0	0	0	0	0	0	12	0
Persewon Wondama	2015	Premier Division	0	0	0	0	0	0	0	0	0	0
Persewon Wondama	Total		12	0	0	0	0	0	0	0	12	0
Perseru Serui	2017	Liga 1	11	0	0	0	0	0	0	0	11	0
Perseru Serui	2018	Liga 1	32	0	0	0	0	0	2 (Note: Appearances in Indonesia President's Cup)	0	34	0
Perseru Serui	Total		43	0	0	0	0	0	2	0	45	0
Borneo	2019	Liga 1	22	0	0	0	0	0	0	0	22	0
Borneo	2020–21	Liga 1	1	0	0	0	0	0	0	0	1	0
Borneo	Total		23	0	0	0	0	0	0	0	23	0
RANS Cilegon	2021	Liga 2	2	0	0	0	0	0	0	0	2	0
Persewar Waropen	2022–23	Liga 2	3	0	0	0	0	0	0	0	3	0
Persipura Jayapura	2023–24	Liga 2	5	0	0	0	0	0	0	0	5	0
Career total			88	0	0	0	0	0	2	0	90	0

== Honours ==
=== Club ===
RANS Cilegon

- Liga 2 runner-up: 2021
