= Sittichok Kannoo =

Thai footballer

Personal information
- Full name: Sittichok Kannoo
- Date of birth: 9 August 1996 (age 30)
- Place of birth: Bangkok, Thailand
- Height: 1.76 m (5 ft 9 1/2 in)
- Positions: Striker; winger

Team information
- Current team: Chiangrai United
- Number: 99

Youth career
- 2011–2013: Suankularb Wittayalai School
- 2013–2014: Buriram United

Senior career*
Years	Team	Apps	(Gls)
2015–2017	Buriram United	20	(2)
2015	→ Surin City (loan)	27	(6)
2017	→ Thai Honda Ladkrabang (loan)	26	(6)
2018–2020	Bangkok United	6	(2)
2019	→ Air Force United (loan)	14	(3)
2020–2024	Ratchaburi	98	(14)
2024–	Chiangrai United	35	(5)

International career^{‡}
2011–2012	Thailand U16	17	(16)
2014	Thailand U17	11	(8)
2014	Thailand U19	9	(4)
2017–2018	Thailand U23	8	(4)
Medal record
Thailand under-23
Dubai Cup
Winner	Dubai Cup 2017	Football
Sea Games
Gold medal – first place	Sea Games 2017	Football
- * Club domestic league appearances and goals as of 07:11, 11 September 2026 (UTC) ‡ National team caps and goals as of 6 January 2018

Sittichok Kannoo (Thai: สิทธิโชค กันหนู, born August 9, 1996), simply known as Ice (Thai: ไอซ์), is a Thai professional footballer who plays as a forward for Thai League 1 club Chiangrai United.

== Club career ==
Kannoo scored his first ever goal for Buriram United in the 75th minute with a great effort to equalize against Nakhon Ratchasima in an eventual 1-1 draw.

== International career ==
He won the 2011 AFF U-16 Youth Championship with Thailand U17. In August 2017, he won the Football at the 2017 Southeast Asian Games with Thailand U23.

== Personal life ==
Sittichok's older brother Attaphon Kannoo is also a footballer.

== International goals ==
=== U16 ===
Sittichok Kannoo – goals for Thailand U16
#	Date	Venue	Opponent	Score	Result	Competition
1.	July 11, 2011	New Laos National Stadium, Vientiane, Laos	Timor-Leste	1-0	6-1	2011 AFF U-16 Youth Championship
2.	July 11, 2011	New Laos National Stadium, Vientiane, Laos	Timor-Leste	2-0	6-1	2011 AFF U-16 Youth Championship
3.	June 6, 2012	New Laos National Stadium, Vientiane, Laos	Australia	2-3	2-4	2012 AFF U-16 Youth Championship

=== U19 ===
Sittichok Kannoo – goals for Thailand U19
#	Date	Venue	Opponent	Score	Result	Competition
1.	September 5, 2014	Mỹ Đình National Stadium, Hanoi, Vietnam	Indonesia	4–2	6–2	2014 AFF U-19 Youth Championship
2.	September 5, 2014	Mỹ Đình National Stadium, Hanoi, Vietnam	Indonesia	5–2	6–2	2014 AFF U-19 Youth Championship
3.	September 11, 2014	Mỹ Đình National Stadium, Hanoi, Vietnam	Japan	1–2	1–2	2014 AFF U-19 Youth Championship

=== U23 ===
Sittichok Kannoo – goals for Thailand U23
#	Date	Venue	Opponent	Score	Result	Competition
1.	20 March 2017	Dubai, United Arab Emirates	United Arab Emirates	1–0	2–1	Dubai Cup
2.	23 March 2017	Dubai, United Arab Emirates	Malaysia	1–0	4–0	Dubai Cup
3.	10 June 2017	Chonburi, Thailand	Iraq	1–1	1–1	Friendly
4.	22 August 2017	Selayang, Malaysia	Philippines	2–0	2–0	2017 Southeast Asian Games

== Honours ==
=== International ===
Thailand U-23

- Sea Games Gold Medal: 2017
- Dubai Cup: 2017

Thailand U-16

- AFF U-16 Youth Championship (1): 2011

=== Club ===
Buriram United

- Thai League 1: 2015
- Thai FA Cup: 2015
- Thai League Cup: 2015
- Toyota Premier Cup: 2016
- Kor Royal Cup : 2015
- Mekong Club Championship: 2015
