= 2014 AFF U-19 Youth Championship =

Giải vô địch bóng đá U19 Đông Nam Á 2014

Tournament details
- Host country: Vietnam
- City: Hanoi
- Dates: 5–13 September
- Teams: 6 (from 1 confederation)
- Venue: 1 (in 1 host city)

Final positions
- Champions: Japan (1st title)
- Runners-up: Vietnam
- Third place: Thailand
- Fourth place: Myanmar

Tournament statistics
- Matches played: 10
- Goals scored: 37 (3.7 per match)
- Top scorer(s): (Japan) Masaya Okugawa (Thailand) Sittichok Kannoo (3 goals)

The 2014 AFF U19 Youth Championship or AFF U-19 Nutifood Cup 2014 held from 5 to 13 September 2014, hosted by Vietnam. 5 members of the ASEAN Football Federation have registered to take part in the competition, these being hosts Vietnam, Thailand, Indonesia, Australia and Myanmar. Japan have also accepted an invitation to take part.

This is the 5th time that Vietnam was host the championship with all matches set to take place in the Mỹ Đình National Stadium, Hanoi, in Northern Vietnam. Previous editions hosted by Vietnam have all been played in Ho Chi Minh City in the South of the country.

Indonesia is the defending champion, however they were unsuccessful in defending their title when they lost 2-6 to Thailand and 0-3 to Myanmar, thereby stopping at the group stage.

== Teams ==
The following teams competed in the tournament as preparation for the 2014 AFC U-19 Championship that was played a month later. Japan are an invited team from outside the region. Two groups of three sides were drawn in early June.

- Australia
- Indonesia
- Japan (Invited)
- Myanmar
- Thailand
- Vietnam (Host)

== Venues ==
Hanoi
Mỹ Đình National Stadium
Capacity: 40,192
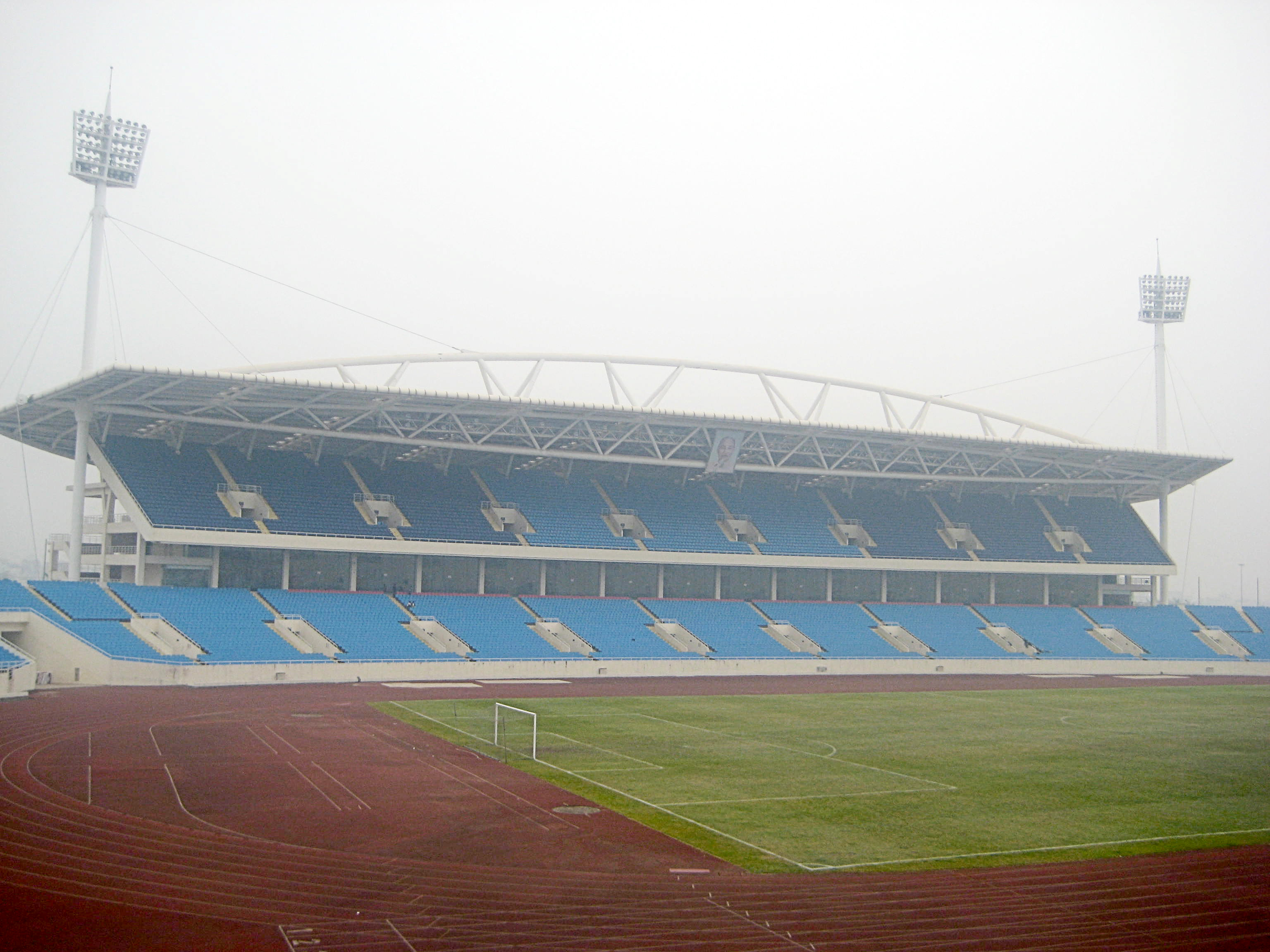

== Standings and results ==
All times are local (UTC+07:00)

Key to colours in group tables
Group winners and runners-up advance to the Semi-finals

=== Group A ===
Team	Pld	W	D	L	GF	GA	GD	Pts
Myanmar	2	2	0	0	5	1	+4	6
Thailand	2	1	0	1	7	4	+3	3
Indonesia	2	0	0	2	2	9	−7	0

5 September 2014
16:30

Indonesia	2–6	Thailand
Alqomar 40'; Martinus 65'	Report	Patiphan 34'; Atthawit 43', 59'; Sittichok 69', 78'; Piyapong 89'

Mỹ Đình National Stadium, Hanoi
Attendance: 18.350
Referee: Đinh Văn Dũng (Vietnam)

7 September 2014
19:00

Thailand	1–2	Myanmar
Nopphon Ponkam 87'	Report	Aung Thu 47'; Htike Htike Aung 63'

Mỹ Đình National Stadium, Hanoi
Attendance: 1.598
Referee: Farhad Bin Mohamed (Singapore)

9 September 2014
16:30

Myanmar	3–0	Indonesia
Nyein Chan Aung 19'; Maung Maung Soe 32', 64'	Report

Mỹ Đình National Stadium, Hanoi
Attendance: 17.545
Referee: Farhad Bin Mohamed (Singapore)

=== Group B ===
Team	Pld	W	D	L	GF	GA	GD	Pts
Japan	2	2	0	0	7	5	+2	6
Vietnam	2	1	0	1	3	3	0	3
Australia	2	0	0	2	3	5	−2	0

5 September 2014
19:00

Vietnam	1–0	Australia
Nguyễn Công Phượng 88'	Report

Mỹ Đình National Stadium, Hanoi
Attendance: 37.785
Referee: Suhaizi Shukri (Malaysia)

7 September 2014
16:30

Australia	3–4	Japan
Galloway 14'; Ascroft 51'; Skapetis 90' (pen.)	Report	Ochi 44'; Okugawa 45+1', 58'; Takagi 90+3'

Mỹ Đình National Stadium, Hanoi
Attendance: 1.025
Referee: Hadimin Shahbuddin (Brunei)

9 September 2014
19:00

Japan	3–2	Vietnam
Ideguchi 57'; Nakano 84'; Kaneko 88'	Report	Nguyễn Văn Toàn 22'; Nguyễn Công Phượng 90' (pen.)

Mỹ Đình National Stadium, Hanoi
Attendance: 40.000
Referee: Mongkolchai Pechsri (Thailand)

== Knockout stage ==
Semi-finals
11 September 2014 – Hanoi
Japan	2
Thailand	1
11 September 2014 – Hanoi
Myanmar	1
Vietnam	4

Final
13 September 2014 – Hanoi
Japan	1
Vietnam	0
Third place play-off
13 September 2014 – Hanoi
Thailand	1
Myanmar	0

=== Semi-finals ===
11 September 2014
16:30

Japan	2–1	Thailand
Okugawa 3'; Nakano 38'	Report	Sittichok 86'

Mỹ Đình National Stadium, Hanoi
Attendance: 23.989
Referee: Suhaizi Shukri (Malaysia)
11 September 2014
19:15

Myanmar	1–4	Vietnam
Aung Thu 54'	Report	Nguyễn Tuấn Anh 30'; Lương Xuân Trường 39'; Nguyễn Văn Toàn 51'; Phan Văn Long 65'

Mỹ Đình National Stadium, Hanoi
Attendance: 44.625
Referee: Hadimin Shahbuddin (Brunei)

=== Third place play-off ===
13 September 2014
16:30

Thailand	1–0	Myanmar
Patiphan 90+1'	Report

Mỹ Đình National Stadium, Hanoi
Attendance: 25.589
Referee: Đinh Văn Dũng (Vietnam)

=== Final ===
13 September 2014
19:00

Vietnam	0–1	Japan
	Report	Omotehara 69'

Mỹ Đình National Stadium, Hanoi
Attendance: 50.000
Referee: Mongkolchai Pechsri (Thailand)

== Winner ==
2014 AFF U-19 Youth Championship Winners
(Japan)
Japan
1st title

== Goalscorers ==
3 goals

- (Japan) Masaya Okugawa
- (Thailand) Sittichok Kannoo

2 goals

- (Japan) Masaomi Nakano
- (Myanmar) Maung Maung Soe
- (Myanmar) Aung Thu
- (Thailand) Atthawit Sukchuai
- (Thailand) Patiphan Pinsermsootsri
- (Vietnam) Nguyễn Công Phượng
- (Vietnam) Nguyễn Văn Toàn

1 goal

- (Australia) Harry Ascroft
- (Australia) Peter Skapetis
- (Australia) Scott Galloway
- (Indonesia) Al-Qomar Tehupelasury
- (Indonesia) Martinus Novianto Ardhi
- (Japan) Yōsuke Ideguchi
- (Japan) Shota Kaneko
- (Japan) Yamato Ochi
- (Japan) Genta Omotehara
- (Japan) Daisuke Takagi
- (Myanmar) Htike Htike Aung
- (Myanmar) Nyein Chan Aung
- (Thailand) Piyapong Homkhajohn
- (Thailand) Nopphon Phonkham
- (Vietnam) Nguyễn Tuấn Anh
- (Vietnam) Lương Xuân Trường
- (Vietnam) Phan Văn Long
