= Supravee Miprathang =

Thai footballer (born 1996)

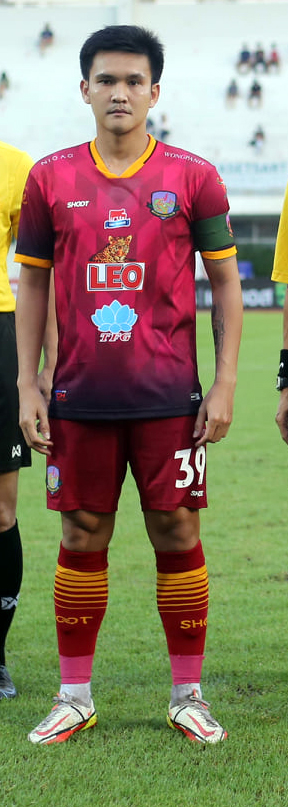
- Supravee Miprathang playing for Kasetsart.

Personal information
- Full name: Supravee Miprathang
- Date of birth: 19 July 1996 (age 30)
- Place of birth: Samut Sakorn, Thailand
- Height: 1.72 m (5 ft 7 1/2 in)
- Position: Left-back

Team information
- Current team: Bangkok
- Number: 2

Youth career
- 2010–2012: Assumption Thonburi
- 2012–2013: Muangthong United

Senior career*
Years	Team	Apps	(Gls)
2013–2015	Muangthong United	2	(0)
2013–2014	→ Assumption United (loan)	29	(3)
2016–2018	Pattaya United	52	(1)
2018–2021	Suphanburi	24	(0)
2021–2022	Kasetsart	21	(0)
2022–2023	Ratchaburi Mitr Phol	4	(0)
2022–2023	→ Sukhothai (loan)	6	(0)
2023	DP Kanchanaburi	11	(0)
2024–2025	Lampang	43	(1)
2025–	Bangkok	19	(0)

International career
2011–2012	Thailand U16	9	(2)
2013–2014	Thailand U19	10	(2)
2016	Thailand U21	2	(0)
2016–2017	Thailand U23	1	(0)
- * Club domestic league appearances and goals as of 24 December 2025

Supravee Miprathang (Thai: สุประวีณ์ มีประทัง, born July 19, 1996), is a Thai professional footballer who plays as a left back for Thai League 2 club Bangkok.

== International career ==
He won the 2011 AFF U-16 Youth Championship with Thailand U17

== International goals ==
=== Under-16 ===
#	Date	Venue	Opponent	Score	Result	Competition
1.	7 July 2011	New Laos National Stadium, Vientiane, Laos	Malaysia	1-0	2-2	2011 AFF U-16 Youth Championship
2.	6 June 2012	New Laos National Stadium, Vientiane, Laos	Australia	1-3	2-4	2012 AFF U-16 Youth Championship

=== Under-19 ===
#	Date	Venue	Opponent	Score	Result	Competition
1.	10 September 2013	Petrokimia Stadium, Gresik Regency, Indonesia	Vietnam	2–3	2–3	2013 AFF U-19 Youth Championship
2.	12 September 2013	Petrokimia Stadium, Gresik Regency, Indonesia	Brunei	1–0	8–0	2013 AFF U-19 Youth Championship

== Honours ==
=== International ===
Thailand U-17

- AFF U-16 Youth Championship: 2011
