= Genta Omotehara =

Japanese footballer

Genta Omotehara 表原 玄太
Personal information
- Full name: Genta Omotehara
- Date of birth: 28 February 1996 (age 30)
- Place of birth: Anan, Japan
- Height: 1.65 m (5 ft 5 in)
- Position: Striker

Team information
- Current team: Tochigi City
- Number: 11

Youth career
- 2011–2013: Vissel Kobe

Senior career*
Years	Team	Apps	(Gls)
2014–2016	Ehime FC	46	(3)
2017–2018	Shonan Bellmare	22	(0)
2018	→Tokushima Vortis (loan)	13	(1)
2019–2020	Tokushima Vortis	5	(0)
2021–2022	Matsumoto Yamaga	19	(1)
2022–	Tochigi City	72	(21)

International career
- Japan U19
- * Club domestic league appearances and goals as of 1 January 2026

Genta Omotehara (表原 玄太, Omotehara Genta; born 28 February 1996) is a Japanese professional football player. He plays for Tochigi City FC.

== Career statistics ==
Updated to end of 2018 season.

Appearances and goals by club, season and competition
Club	Season	League			Emperor's Cup		J.League Cup		Total	
Club	Season	Division	Apps	Goals	Apps	Goals	Apps	Goals	Apps	Goals
Ehime FC	2014	J2 League	24	1	1	1	—		25	2
Ehime FC	2015	J2 League	7	1	3	0	—		10	1
Ehime FC	2016	J2 League	15	1	2	1	—		17	2
Shonan Bellmare	2017	J2 League	20	0	2	1	7	1	29	2
Shonan Bellmare	2018	J1 League	2	0	1	1	0	0	3	1
Tokushima Vortis	2018	J2 League	13	1	0	0	—		13	1
Career total			81	4	9	4	7	1	97	9

== Honours ==
=== International ===
Japan U-19

- AFF U-19 Youth Championship Winners (1) : 2014
