= Kento Kawata =

Japanese footballer

Kento Kawata 川田 拳登
Personal information
- Full name: Kento Kawata
- Date of birth: July 9, 1997 (age 29)
- Place of birth: Fukuoka, Japan
- Height: 1.70 m (5 ft 7 in)
- Position: Forward

Team information
- Current team: Vonds Ichihara

Youth career
- 2013–2015: Omiya Ardija

Senior career*
Years	Team	Apps	(Gls)
2016–2020	Omiya Ardija	2	(0)
2017	→ Thespakusatsu Gunma (loan)	5	(0)
2017–2019	→ Tochigi SC (loan)	38	(4)
2020	→ Nagano Parceiro (loan)	20	(0)
2021–2023	Nagano Parceiro	15	(0)
2023–	Vonds Ichihara		
- * Club domestic league appearances and goals as of 15:33, 30 November 2023 (UTC)

Kento Kawata (川田 拳登, Kawata Kento; born July 9, 1997) is a Japanese football player who currently plays for Vonds Ichihara.

== Career ==
Kento Kawata joined J1 League club Omiya Ardija in 2016. On June 6, he debuted in J.League Cup (v Shonan Bellmare).

== Club statistics ==
Updated to 22 February 2018.

Club performance			League		Cup		League Cup		Total	
Season	Club	League	Apps	Goals	Apps	Goals	Apps	Goals	Apps	Goals
Japan			League		Emperor's Cup		J. League Cup		Total	
2016	Omiya Ardija	J1 League	0	0	0	0	1	0	1	0
2017	Thespakusatsu Gunma	J2 League	5	0	1	0	–		6	0
2017	Tochigi SC	J3 League	11	3	–		–		11	3
Total			16	3	1	0	1	0	18	3
