= Marcos Gusmão =

Brazilian association football player (born 1966)

Personal information
- Full name: Marcos Antônio Alves Gusmão
- Date of birth: 22 May 1966 (age 60)
- Place of birth: São Paulo, Brazil

Managerial career
- Years: Team
- 2002: New Radiant
- 2003–2004: Pimentense
- 2004–2011: Papua New Guinea
- 2021–2022: Papua New Guinea
- 2025–2026: PNG Hekari

Marcos Gusmão (born 22 May 1966 in São Paulo) is a Brazilian professional football manager.

== Career ==
From 2004 to 2011 he coached the Papua New Guinea national team. He was reappointed to the position in December 2021. On 22 October 2025, Marcos Gusmão was announced as the manager of PNG Hekari.
