= Masaomi Nakano =

Japanese footballer

Masaomi Nakano 中野 雅臣
Personal information
- Full name: Masaomi Nakano
- Date of birth: 9 April 1996 (age 30)
- Place of birth: Chūō-ku, Saitama, Japan
- Height: 1.81 m (5 ft 11 in)
- Position: Midfielder

Team information
- Current team: Iwate Grulla Morioka
- Number: 49

Youth career
- 2009–2014: Tokyo Verdy

Senior career*
Years	Team	Apps	(Gls)
2014–2020	Tokyo Verdy	24	(0)
2017–2019	→ FC Imabari (loan)	18	(0)

International career
2013	Japan U-17	2	(0)
- * Club domestic league appearances and goals as of 2 January 2020

Masaomi Nakano (中野 雅臣, Nakano, Masaomi; born 9 April 1996) is a Japanese footballer who plays for Iwate Grulla Morioka.

== National team career ==
In October 2013, Nakano was elected Japan U-17 national team for 2013 U-17 World Cup. He played 2 matches.

== Career statistics ==
Updated to 2 January 2020.

Appearances and goals by club, season and competition
Club	Season	League			Emperor's Cup		Total	
Club	Season	Division	Apps	Goals	Apps	Goals	Apps	Goals
Tokyo Verdy	2014	J2 League	2	0	0	0	2	0
Tokyo Verdy	2015	J2 League	9	0	0	0	9	0
Tokyo Verdy	2016	J2 League	7	0	0	0	7	0
Tokyo Verdy	2017	J2 League	6	0	1	0	7	0
FC Imabari	2017	JFL	5	0	–		5	0
FC Imabari	2018	JFL	0	0	0	0	0	0
FC Imabari	2019	JFL	13	0	–		13	0
Career total			42	0	1	0	43	0
