= Dio Permana =

Indonesian footballer

Personal information
- Full name: Dio Permana
- Date of birth: 7 June 1995 (age 31)
- Place of birth: Malang, Indonesia
- Height: 1.68 m (5 ft 6 in)
- Position: Midfielder

Youth career
- 2010: SSB Kaki Mas Malang
- 2011: Persema Malang

Senior career*
Years	Team	Apps	(Gls)
2011–2013	Persema Malang	28	(7)
2014	Persekap Pasuruan	17	(3)
2015–2017	Arema	1	(0)
2018	Persela Lamongan	3	(0)
2019	Madura	0	(0)
Total		49	(0)

International career
2012	Indonesia U21	1	(0)
2013–2014	Indonesia U19	5	(0)
- * Club domestic league appearances and goals

Dio Permana (born 7 June 1995) is an Indonesian former footballer who played as a midfielder.

== Career ==
=== Persema Malang ===
Dio joined Indonesia Premier League club Persema Malang, who were trained by Slave Radovski at the time, as a 17-year-old. Persema provided a long-term contract for Dio. In 2012, he had a trial at Dutch club SC Heerenveen.

== International career ==
In 2012, Dio became the youngest player in the Indonesia U-22 squad for the 2013 AFC U-22 Championship qualification. In 2013, he and three other players were called to Indonesia U-19 for the 2014 AFC U-19 Championship qualification. Indonesia U-19 qualified for the 2014 AFC U-19 Championship after winning Group G.
