= Phạm Trùm Tỉnh =

Vietnamese footballer

Personal information
- Full name: Phạm Trùm Tỉnh
- Date of birth: 2 May 1995 (age 31)
- Place of birth: Tây Hòa, Phú Yên, Vietnam
- Height: 1.68 m (5 ft 6 in)
- Position: Midfielder

Team information
- Current team: Đông Á Thanh Hóa
- Number: 23

Youth career
- 2008–2015: Sanna Khánh Hòa BVN

Senior career*
Years	Team	Apps	(Gls)
2016–2020	Sanna Khánh Hòa BVN	51	(7)
2020–2022	Hồ Chí Minh City	8	(1)
2023	Khánh Hòa	15	(1)
2024–	Đông Á Thanh Hóa	23	(1)

International career
2013–2014	Vietnam U19	10	(0)
- * Club domestic league appearances and goals as of 7 June 2025

Phạm Trùm Tỉnh (born 2 May 1995) is a Vietnamese professional footballer who plays as a midfielder for the V.League 1 club Đông Á Thanh Hóa.

== Club career ==
Phạm Trùm Tỉnh made his V.League 1 debut on 18 September 2016 in Khanh Hoa FC's 3–1 win over Than Quang Ninh.

== International career ==
Phạm Trùm Tỉnh is a youth international footballer for Vietnam.

== Honours ==
Thanh Hóa

- Vietnamese Cup: 2023–24
