= Atthawit Sukchuai =

Thai footballer (born 1996)

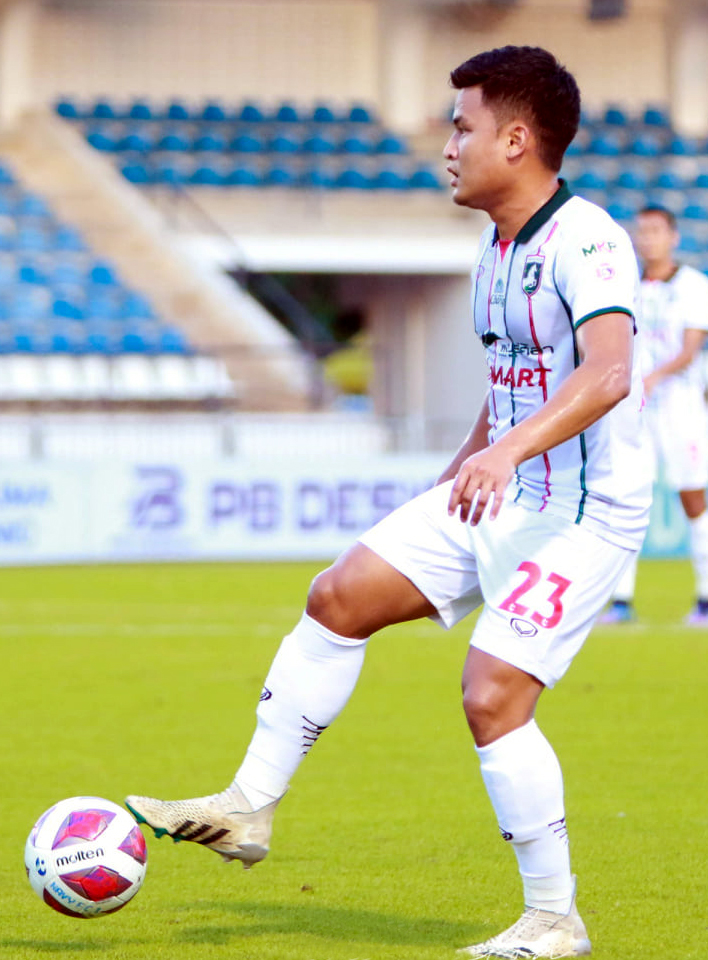
- Atthawit Sukchuai playing for Phrae United.

Personal information
- Full name: Atthawit Sukchuai
- Date of birth: 13 March 1996 (age 30)
- Place of birth: Bangkok, Thailand
- Height: 1.69 m (5 ft 6 1/2 in)
- Position: Attacking midfielder

Team information
- Current team: Muang Loei United
- Number: 28

Youth career
- 2009–2011: Assumption College Thonburi
- 2011–2012: Aspire Academy

Senior career*
Years	Team	Apps	(Gls)
2012	Muangthong United	0	(0)
2012	→ Assumption United (loan)	16	(5)
2013–2016	Ratchaburi Mitr Phol	27	(0)
2017–2021	BG Pathum United	8	(0)
2018	→ Suphanburi (loan)	7	(0)
2019	→ Chiangrai United (loan)	4	(0)
2019	→ Chiangmai (loan)	41	(2)
2021	→ Khon Kaen United (loan)	13	(0)
2022	Phrae United	16	(0)
2022	Rajpracha	16	(1)
2023	Chiangmai United	9	(1)
2024	Phrae United	12	(0)
2024	Samut Sakhon City	22	(6)
2025	Muang Loei United	6	(1)

International career
2011–2012	Thailand U16	11	(3)
2013–2014	Thailand U19	14	(3)
2014	Thailand U23	1	(0)
- * Club domestic league appearances and goals as of 12 May 2023

Atthawit Sukchuai (Thai: อรรถวิท สุขช่วย; born March 13, 1996) is a Thai professional footballer who plays as an attacking midfielder.

== Honours ==
=== International ===
Thailand U-17

- AFF U-16 Youth Championship: 2011

== International career ==
He won the 2011 AFF U-16 Youth Championship with Thailand U17.
