= 2019 Chonburi F.C. season =

Chonburi
2019 season
- Chairman: Wittaya Khunpluem
- Manager: Jukkapant Punpee (until 31 May 2019); Sasom Pobprasert (from 3 June 2019)
- Stadium: Chonburi Stadium
- Thai League T1: 7th
- Thai FA Cup: Round of 64
- Thai League Cup: First round
- Top goalscorer: League: Lukian (11); All: Lukian (11)
- Highest home attendance: 8,450 v Buriram United; Thai League; 30 June 2019
- Lowest home attendance: 3,251 v PT Prachuap; Thai League; 31 March 2019
Home colours	Away colours	Third colours

The 2019 season is Chonburi's 14th season in the Thai League T1 since 2006.

== Players ==
=== Squad information ===
As of 19 July 2019

Note: Flags indicate national team as defined under FIFA eligibility rules; some limited exceptions apply. Players may hold more than one non-FIFA nationality.

No.	Pos.	Nation	Player
1	GK	THA	Worawut Sukuna
2	DF	THA	Noppanon Kachaplayuk (Vice-captain)
3	DF	MYA	Zaw Min Tun (on loan from Yangon United)
4	MF	THA	Teerapong Deehamhae
5	DF	THA	Kritsada Kaman
7	FW	BRA	Caion (on loan from PT Prachuap)
8	MF	THA	Worachit Kanitsribampen
10	MF	THA	Kroekrit Thaweekarn (Captain)
11	FW	THA	Sittichok Paso
14	FW	THA	Teeratep Winothai (on loan from Bangkok United)
15	MF	THA	Wittaya Madlam
17	GK	THA	Sarut Nasri
18	DF	THA	Nattapong Phephat
19	MF	THA	Saharat Sontisawat
20	FW	THA	Arthit Boodjinda (on loan from Port)

No.	Pos.	Nation	Player
21	FW	PHI	Curt Dizon
24	MF	THA	Phanuphong Phonsa
28	DF	THA	Niran Hansson
30	DF	KOR	Kim Gyeong-min
33	DF	BRA	Júnior Lopes
35	GK	THA	Chanin Sae-ear
42	FW	THA	Sompong Soleb (on loan from Bangkok United)
56	MF	THA	Channarong Promsrikaew
63	DF	THA	Thanaset Sujarit
71	MF	THA	Datsakorn Thonglao
79	FW	THA	Settawut Wongsai
81	DF	THA	Mongkol Namnuad
88	FW	PHI	Ángel Guirado
99	GK	THA	Sinthaweechai Hathairattanakool

Note 1: The official club website lists the supporters as player 12th man. Note 2: Players who are AFC Champions League quota foreign players are listed in bold.

=== Out on loan ===
Note: Flags indicate national team as defined under FIFA eligibility rules; some limited exceptions apply. Players may hold more than one non-FIFA nationality.

No.	Pos.	Nation	Player
—	GK	THA	Wattanapong Tabutda (at (Thailand) Phuket City)
—	DF	THA	Chonlatit Jantakam (at (Thailand) Phrae United)
—	GK	THA	Chakhon Philakhlang (at (Thailand) Khon Kaen)
—	FW	THA	Krit Phavaputanon (at (Thailand) Ayutthaya)
—	DF	THA	Jeerasak In-eiam (at (Thailand) Phuket City)
—	DF	THA	Komkrit Camsokchuerk (at (Thailand) Kasetsart)
—	DF	THA	Adisak Narattho (at (Thailand) Kasetsart)
—	MF	THA	Panudech Maiwong (at (Thailand) Phuket City)
—	MF	THA	Nattayot Pol-yiam (at (Thailand) Phuket City)
—	DF	THA	Noto Boontawan (at (Thailand) Phuket City)
—	MF	THA	Thanasit Wiroonchutiporn (at (Thailand) Phuket City)
—	MF	THA	Rachata Moraksa (at (Thailand) Phuket City)
—	GK	THA	Thanakorn Waiyawut (at (Thailand) Phuket City)
—	GK	THA	Phongpaphat Thabuda (at (Thailand) Phuket City)
—	DF	THA	Heman Kittiampaiplurk (at (Thailand) Phuket City)
—	MF	THA	Nattawut Chootiwat (at (Thailand) Phuket City)
—	DF	THA	Kittitach Praniti (at (Thailand) Phuket City)
—	MF	THA	Nattawut Saengsri (at (Thailand) Phuket City)
—	MF	THA	Ekkachai Rittipan (at (Thailand) Trat)

No.	Pos.	Nation	Player
—	MF	LAO	Phathana Phommathep (at (Thailand) Phuket City)
—	DF	THA	Sampan Kesi (at (Thailand) Phuket City)
—	MF	THA	Athiwat Poolsawat (at (Thailand) Phuket City)
—	FW	THA	Kittisak Bunmak (at (Thailand) Phuket City)
—	MF	THA	Nititorn Sripramarn (at (Thailand) Phuket City)
—	MF	THA	Patthadon Tiangwong (at (Thailand) Phuket City)
—	DF	THA	Autthagowit Jantod (at (Thailand) Phuket City)
—	MF	THA	Praphawit Jaroenthat (at (Thailand) Phuket City)
—	FW	THA	Sunchai Chaolaokwan (at (Thailand) Phuket City)
—	GK	THA	Jirunpong Thammasiha (at (Thailand) Phuket City)
—	FW	THA	Ritthidet Phensawat (at (Thailand) Phuket City)
—	DF	THA	Arthit Kansangwet (at (Thailand) Kasetsart)
—	MF	THA	Nuttapol Srisamutr (at (Thailand) Phuket City)
—	MF	THA	Karn Jorated (at (Thailand) Phuket City)
—	DF	THA	Ekkarat Buarin (at (Thailand) Phuket City)
—	MF	THA	Jetsada Hongsawong (at (Thailand) Phuket City)
—	MF	THA	Patiphan Pinsermsootsri (at (Thailand) MOF Customs United)
—	MF	THA	Wattanasap Jarernsri (at (Thailand) Thai Honda)
—	GK	THA	Tanachai Noorach (at (Thailand) Rayong)

== Competitions ==
=== Overview ===
Competition	First match	Last match	Starting round	Record							
Competition	First match	Last match	Starting round	Pld	W	D	L	GF	GA	GD	Win %
Thai League	23 February 2019	27 October 2019	Matchday 1	23	8	6	9	34	37	−3	34.78
FA Cup	1 May 2019	1 May 2019	Round of 64	1	0	1	0	3	3	+0	0.00
Total				24	8	7	9	37	40	−3	33.33

Last updated: 31 July 2019
Source: Competitions

=== Thai League ===
==== League table ====
Pos	Team	Pld	W	D	L	GF	GA	GD	Pts
5	Muangthong United	30	14	4	12	45	42	+3	46
6	Samut Prakan City	30	12	7	11	44	50	−6	43
7	Chonburi	30	11	7	12	43	45	−2	40
8	Ratchaburi Mitr Phol	30	10	8	12	48	48	0	38
9	Prachuap	30	9	10	11	32	44	−12	37

Source: Thai League
Rules for classification: 1) Points; 2) Head-to-head points; 3) Head-to-head goals difference; 4) Head-to-head goals scored; 5) Overall goals difference; 6) Overall goals scored; 7) Fair play points; 8) Play-off without extra time;).

==== Results summary ====
Overall								Home						Away					
Pld	W	D	L	GF	GA	GD	Pts	W	D	L	GF	GA	GD	W	D	L	GF	GA	GD
23	8	6	9	34	37	−3	30	6	3	2	23	18	+5	2	3	7	11	19	−8

==== Results by matchday ====
Matchday	1	2	3	4	5	6	7	8	9	10	11	12	13	14	15	16	17	18	19	20	21	22	23	24	25	26	27	28	29	30
Ground	A	H	H	A	H	A	A	H	A	H	A	H	A	H	A	H	A	A	H	A	H	H	A							
Result	D	L	L	L	W	W	D	W	L	D	L	W	L	W	L	W	L	D	D	W	W	D	L							
Position	6	12	15	16	15	10	10	8	8	8	10	9	10	8	10	8	9	9	11	9	7	7	7							

Updated to match(es) played on 28 April 2019. Source: Thai League T1
A = Away; H = Home; W = Win; D = Draw; L = Loss

==== Matches ====
23 February 2019 1	Buriram United	2–2	Chonburi	Buriram
19:00 UTC+7	Supachok 65', 67'	Report	Kroekrit 76'; Worachit 57'	Stadium: Chang Arena; Attendance: 15,491; Referee: Pairoj Bunkamnoed

2 March 2019 2	Chonburi	0–2	Samut Prakan City	Chonburi
18:00 UTC+7		Report	Ibson 46', 90+3'	Stadium: Chonburi Stadium; Attendance: 4,622; Referee: Panumas Pansamo

8 March 2019 3	Chonburi	2–3	Port	Chonburi
20:00 UTC+7	Lukian 39'; Worachit 54'	Report	Seul-ki 45+2'; Suárezi 66'; Arthit 79'	Stadium: Chonburi Stadium; Attendance: 4,270; Referee: Mongkolchai Petsri

16 March 2019 4	Suphanburi	3–0	Chonburi	Suphan Buri
18:00 UTC+7	Reis 39', 90+3'; Cleiton 49'	Report		Stadium: Suphan Buri Provincial Stadium; Attendance: 7,517; Referee: Chairurk Ngamsom

31 March 2019 5	Chonburi	3–2	PT Prachuap	Chonburi
18:00 UTC+7	Zaw Min Tun 4'; Lukian 19', 90+2'	Report	Caion 53'; Adun 67'	Stadium: Chonburi Stadium; Attendance: 3,251; Referee: Wichet Tianthong

3 April 2019 6	Bangkok United	2–4	Chonburi	Khlong Luang, Pathum Thani
19:00 UTC+7	Bonilla 48' (pen.); Havenaar 73'	Report	Lukian 28', 53'; Phanuphong 34'; Sithu Aung 80'	Stadium: Thammasat Stadium; Attendance: 2,692; Referee: Natee Chusuwan

7 April 2019 7	Sukhothai	0–0	Chonburi	Sukhothai
18:00 UTC+7		Report		Stadium: Thung Thalay Luang Stadium; Attendance: 3,260; Referee: Sumate Saiwaew

21 April 2019 8	Chonburi	7–5	Chiangmai	Chonburi
19:00 UTC+7	Lukian 18', 39', 42', 45' (pen.); Sithu Aung 80'; Sittichok 90+3'	Report	Azadzoy 20', 55'; Ekanit 31'; Wanmai 89'; Eliandro 90+2'	Stadium: Chonburi Stadium; Attendance: 3,390; Referee: Chairurk Ngamsom

28 April 2019 9	Nakhon Ratchasima	4–0	Chonburi	Nakhon Ratchasima
18:00 UTC+7	Assumpção 40', 68', 85' (pen.); Doumbia 31'	Report		Stadium: 80th Birthday Stadium; Attendance: 12,677; Referee: Chalach Piromya

11 May 2019 10	Chonburi	3–3	Trat	Chonburi
18:00 UTC+7	Cruz 5'; Sittichok 69'; Lukian 90+1'	Report	Diouf 31', 71', 90+3'	Stadium: Chonburi Stadium; Attendance: 3,605; Referee: Preecha Kangram

19 May 2019 11	Chiangrai United	1–0	Chonburi	Chiang Rai
18:00 UTC+7	Somkid 61'	Report		Stadium: Singha Stadium; Attendance: 3,990; Referee: Wirote Onkoke

26 May 2019 12	Chonburi	1–0	Ratchaburi Mitr Phol	Chonburi
18:00 UTC+7	Worachit 41'	Report		Stadium: Chonburi Stadium; Attendance: 3,545; Referee: Sumate Saiwaew

29 May 2019 13	PTT Rayong	1–0	Chonburi	Rayong
20:00 UTC+7	Saharat 88'	Report		Stadium: PTT Stadium; Attendance: 2,509; Referee: Sophon Mahaboon

16 June 2019 14	Chonburi	2–0	Muangthong United	Chonburi
19:00 UTC+7	Kritsada 27'; Phanuphong 74'	Report		Stadium: Chonburi Stadium; Attendance: 6,242; Referee: Mongkol Rungklay

23 June 2019 15	Chainat Hornbill	1–0	Chonburi	Chai Nat
18:00 UTC+7	Chatchai 42'	Report		Stadium: Khao Plong Stadium; Attendance: 4,249; Referee: Sivakorn Puudom

30 June 2019 16	Chonburi	1–0	Buriram United	Chonburi
19:00 UTC+7	Caion 80'	Report		Stadium: Chonburi Stadium; Attendance: 8,450; Referee: Anusorn Nookaew

7 July 2019 17	Samut Prakan City	1–0	Chonburi	Samut Prakarn
18:00 UTC+7	Chayawat 90+3'	Report		Stadium: Samut Prakarn Stadium; Attendance: 4,434; Referee: Sarawut Janngoen

13 July 2019 18	Port	2–2	Chonburi	Bangkok
19:00 UTC+7	Siwakorn 18'; Suárez 45+1'	Report	Worachit 8'; Caion 42'	Stadium: PAT Stadium; Attendance: 5,955; Referee: Vitsavet Sangnakorn

20 July 2019 19	Chonburi	0–0	Suphanburi	Chonburi
20:00 UTC+7		Report		Stadium: Chonburi Stadium; Attendance: 4,397; Referee: Chaireag Ngamsom

27 July 2019 20	PT Prachuap	0–2	Chonburi	Prachuap Khiri Khan
17:45 UTC+7		Report	Worachit 69'; Guirado 75'	Stadium: Sam Ao Stadium; Attendance: 3,480; Referee: Teetichai Nualjan

31 July 2019 21	Chonburi	2–1	Bangkok United	Chonburi
19:00 UTC+7	Caion 32'; Sittichok 62'	Report	Bonilla 90+5' (pen.)	Stadium: Chonburi Stadium; Attendance: 4,829; Referee: Mongkolchai Pechsri

3 August 2019 22	Chonburi	2–2	Sukhothai	Chonburi
20:00 UTC+7	Caion 13'; Guirado 61'	Report	Kabfah 30'; Herrera 59'	Stadium: Chonburi Stadium; Attendance: 5,629; Referee: Mongkol Rungklay

10 August 2019 23	Chiangmai	2–1	Chonburi	Chiang Rai
17:45 UTC+7	Evson 22'; Eliandro 90+4'	Report	Kritsada 9'	Stadium: Singha Stadium; Attendance: 1,011; Referee: Sivakorn Puudom

== FA Cup ==
1 May 2019 First round	Thai Honda	3–3 (5−3 p)	Chonburi	Min Buri, Bangkok
18:00 UTC+7	Nagasaki 38'; Thanet 54'; Natthapon 90+2'	Report	Sittichok 8', 81'; Cruz 45+3'	Stadium: 72nd Anniversary Stadium; Attendance: 860; Referee: Sarayut Chakngoen
	Penalties
	Tawin (penalty scored); Meedech (penalty scored); Nagasaki (penalty scored); Valdo (penalty scored); Tanat (penalty scored)		(penalty scored) Phanuphong; (penalty scored) Kim Gyeong-min; (penalty scored) Saharat; (penalty missed) Worachit

== League Cup ==
15 May 2019 Round of 64	JL Chiangmai United	2–1	Chonburi	Chiang Mai
20:00 UTC+7	Soares 24'; Erivelto 90'	Report	Saharat 9'	Stadium: 700th Anniversary Stadium; Attendance: 688
