= 2020–21 Chonburi F.C. season =

Chonburi
2020-21 season
- Chairman: Wittaya Khunpluem
- Manager: Sasom Pobprasert
- Stadium: Chonburi Stadium, Mueang Chonburi, Chonburi, Thailand
- Thai League T1: 12th
- Thai FA Cup: Runners-up
- Top goalscorer: League: Caion (6); All: Caion (7)
Home colours	Away colours	Third colours

The 2020–21 season is Chonburi's 15th season in the Thai League T1 since 2006.

== Players ==
=== Current squad ===
As of 4 February 2020 Note: Flags indicate national team as defined under FIFA eligibility rules; some limited exceptions apply. Players may hold more than one non-FIFA nationality.

No.	Pos.	Nation	Player
2	DF	THA	Noppanon Kachaplayuk (Vice-captain)
3	DF	PHI	Carli de Murga
4	MF	THA	Teerapong Deehamhae
5	MF	THA	Kritsada Kaman
8	MF	THA	Worachit Kanitsribampen
10	MF	THA	Kroekrit Thaweekarn (Captain)
13	DF	THA	Nattapong Pheephat
16	DF	THA	Korawit Namwiset
17	GK	THA	Sarut Nasri
18	DF	THA	Mongkol Namnuad
19	MF	THA	Saharat Sontisawat
20	MF	THA	Ekkachai Rittipan
22	MF	JPN	Kazuto Kushida
23	FW	MNE	Dragan Bošković
24	MF	THA	Phanuphong Phonsa
26	MF	THA	Narathip Kruearanya

No.	Pos.	Nation	Player
27	FW	THA	Settawut Wongsai
28	DF	THA	Niran Hansson
30	GK	THA	Chakhon Philakhlang
33	DF	BRA	Júnior Lopes
35	GK	THA	Chanin Sae-ear
40	MF	THA	Adul Lahsoh
48	MF	THA	Nattayot Pol-yiam
50	DF	THA	Songchai Thongcham
52	DF	THA	Pongsakorn Trisat
53	DF	THA	Chatmongkol Rueangthanarot
55	MF	THA	Narutchai Nimboon
56	MF	THA	Channarong Promsrikaew
75	DF	THA	Sampan Kesi
90	GK	THA	Anuchid Taweesri
99	GK	THA	Sinthaweechai Hathairattanakool (3rd captain)

Note 1: The official club website lists the supporters as player 12th man. Note 2: Players who are AFC Champions League quota foreign players are listed in bold.

=== Out on loan ===
Note: Flags indicate national team as defined under FIFA eligibility rules; some limited exceptions apply. Players may hold more than one non-FIFA nationality.

No.	Pos.	Nation	Player
—	GK	THA	Phongpaphat Thabuda (at (Thailand) Banbueng)
—	DF	THA	Jakkapong Sanmahung (at (Thailand) Banbueng)
—	MF	THA	Pongsakorn Trisat (at (Thailand) Banbueng)
—	MF	THA	Rachata Moraksa (at (Thailand) Banbueng)
—	MF	THA	Nethithorn Kaewcharoen (at (Thailand) Banbueng)
—	MF	THA	Patthadon Tiangwong (at (Thailand) Banbueng)
—	MF	THA	Nititorn Sripraman (at (Thailand) Banbueng)
—	FW	THA	Kittiphong Khetpara (at (Thailand) Banbueng)
—	MF	THA	Sarawut Saowaros (at (Thailand) Banbueng)

No.	Pos.	Nation	Player
—	FW	THA	Warakorn Thongbai (at (Thailand) Khon Kaen United)
—	FW	THA	Settawut Wongsai (at (Thailand) MOF Customs United)
—	DF	THA	Thanaset Sujarit (at (Thailand) Ratchaburi Mitr Phol)
—	MF	THA	Panudech Maiwong (at (Thailand) Prachuap)
—	DF	THA	Arthit Kansangwet (at (Thailand) Kasetsart)
—	MF	THA	Nattawut Chootiwat (at (Thailand) Muangnont Bankunmae)
—	MF	THA	Karn Jorated (at (Thailand) Lamphun Warrior)
—	MF	THA	Noto Boontawan (at (Thailand) Pattaya Discovery United)
—	MF	THA	Chaiwat Weerakijphanich (at (Thailand) Sakaeo)
