= 2016 Chonburi F.C. season =

Chonburi
2016 season
- Chairman: Wittaya Khunpluem
- Manager: Therdsak Chaiman
- Stadium: Chon Buri Stadium, Mueang Chonburi, Chon Buri, Thailand
- Thai League: 5th
- Thai FA Cup: Champions Shared with Ratchaburi Mitr Phol, Sukhothai, and Chainat Hornbill
- Thai League Cup: Round of 16
- AFC Champions League: Play-off round
- Top goalscorer: League: Rodrigo Vergilio (12); All: Leandro Assumpção (20)
Home colours	Away colours

The 2016 season is Chonburi's 11th season in the Thai Premier League of Chonburi Football Club.

== Players ==
Note: Flags indicate national team as defined under FIFA eligibility rules; some limited exceptions apply. Players may hold more than one non-FIFA nationality.

No.	Pos.	Nation	Player
1	GK	THA	Tanachai Noorach
2	DF	THA	Noppanon Kachaplayuk
4	MF	THA	Kroekrit Thaweekarn
5	MF	KOR	Kim Jong-pil (on loan from Shonan Bellmare)
6	DF	THA	Suttinun Phuk-hom
7	FW	BRA	Leandro Assumpção
8	MF	THA	Therdsak Chaiman (Vice-captain)
10	FW	THA	Pipob On-Mo
11	DF	THA	Korrakot Wiriyaudomsiri
13	MF	THA	Nurul Sriyankem
14	MF	KOR	Kim Chul-ho
15	FW	THA	Krit Phavaputanon
16	DF	THA	Alongkorn Prathumwong
17	MF	THA	Naruphol Ar-Romsawa (on loan from Buriram United)
19	MF	THA	Narong Jansawek

No.	Pos.	Nation	Player
20	DF	THA	Tiwa Nueaket
21	MF	THA	Prakit Deeprom (on loan from Buriram United)
22	MF	THA	Pokklaw Anan
23	FW	BRA	Rodrigo Vergilio
24	MF	THA	Worachit Kanitsribampen
25	DF	THA	Chonlatit Jantakam (Captain)
26	DF	BRA	Anderson
28	FW	THA	Sittichok Phaso
30	GK	THA	Chakhon Philakhlang
33	MF	THA	Phanuphong Phonsa
35	GK	THA	Chanin Sae-ear
36	DF	THA	Arthit Kansangwet
38	MF	THA	Panudech Maiwong
39	FW	THA	Saharat Sontisawat

Note 1: The official club website lists the supporters as player 12th man. Note 2: Players who are AFC Champions League quota foreign players are listed in bold.

== Foreign players ==
Note: Flags indicate national team as defined under FIFA eligibility rules; some limited exceptions apply. Players may hold more than one non-FIFA nationality.

No.	Pos.	Nation	Player
5	MF	KOR	Kim Jong-pil
7	FW	BRA	Leandro Assumpção
14	MF	KOR	Kim Chul-ho
23	FW	BRA	Rodrigo Vergilio
26	DF	BRA	Anderson dos Santos

== Pre-season and friendlies ==
Date	Opponents	H / A	Result F–A	Scorer(s)
17 January 2016	(Malaysia) Johor Darul Ta'zim	H	2–0	Pipob 26', Prakit 49'
8 October 2016	(Japan) Kashima Antlers	H	0–5	

== Thai League ==
Toyota Thai League

Date	Opponents	H / A	Result F–A	Scorers	League position
6 March 2016	Pattaya United	H	2–1	Nurul 15', Rodrigo 64'	5th
9 March 2016	Suphanburi	H	1–2	Suttinan 54'	8th
13 March 2016	Sukhothai	H	2–2	Anderson 25', Jong-pil 58'	8th
30 March 2016	Chainat Hornbill	A	4–1	Rodrigo 31', Prakit (2) 45+3', 84', Phanuphong 71'	4th
2 April 2016	Osotspa M-150 Samut Prakan	H	3–0	Prakit 47', Rodrigo 48', Assumpção 79'	3rd
15 April 2016	Buriram United	A	2–3	Assumpção 64', Rodrigo 80'	8th
24 April 2016	Nakhon Ratchasima Mazda	A	0–0		7th
27 April 2016	Army United	H	1–1	Prakit 58'	10th
1 May 2016	SCG Muangthong United	A	0–1		10th
7 May 2016	BEC Tero Sasana	H	1–0	Narong 56'	8th
11 May 2016	Ratchaburi Mitr Phol	A	0–0		10th
14 May 2016	Bangkok Glass	H	2–1	Prakit 24', Narong 35'	7th
22 May 2016	Navy	A	2–3	Kroekrit 35', Rodrigo 66'	9th
28 May 2016	Bangkok United	H	0–1		9th
11 June 2016	Sisaket	A	0–1		11th
18 June 2016	BBCU	A	1–1	Assumpção 57'	11th
22 June 2016	Chiangrai United	H	2–1	Prakit 36', Rodrigo 48'	8th
25 June 2016	Pattaya NNK United (Note: In mid-2016, Pattaya United change the name to Pattaya NNK United due to their take sponsor.)	A	2–0	Jong-pil 42', Assumpção 87'	8th
29 June 2016	Suphanburi	A	0–0		7th
3 July 2016	Sukhothai	A	2–1	Assumpção 45+1', Pokklaw 59'	7th
9 July 2016	Chainat Hornbill	H	7–2	Pokklaw (2) 6', 55', Assumpção (2) 43', 64', Prince 75', Rodrigo (2) 90', 90+1'	7th
16 July 2016	Super Power Samut Prakan (Note: In mid-2016, Osotspa M-150 Samut Prakan change the name to Super Power Samut Prakan due to their take over.)	A	0–1		7th
20 July 2016	Nakhon Ratchasima Mazda	H	1–1	Prince 46'	7th
24 July 2016	Army United	A	2–0	Prince 36', Nurul 68'	6th
30 July 2016	SCG Muangthong United	H	0–3		8th
6 August 2016	BEC Tero Sasana	A	3–1	Assumpção (2) 47', 86', Prince 53'	7th
13 August 2016	Ratchaburi Mitr Phol	H	2–0	Assumpção (2) 74', 79'	7th
20 August 2016	Bangkok Glass	A	1–1	Prince 68'	7th
11 September 2016	Navy	H	4–1	Rodrigo (3) 45+1', 70', 86', Kroekrit 80'	5th
17 September 2016	Bangkok United	A	1–1	Prince 62'	6th
25 September 2016	Sisaket	H	4–2	Prince (2) 6', 25', Pokklaw 70', Rodrigo 88'	5th

=== League table ===
Pos	Team	Pld	W	D	L	GF	GA	GD	Pts	Qualification or relegation
3	Bangkok Glass	31	18	3	10	62	41	+21	57	
4	Buriram United	30	15	10	5	55	38	+17	55	
5	Chonburi	31	14	9	8	52	33	+19	51	
6	Ratchaburi Mitr Phol	30	14	7	9	52	35	+17	49	
7	Sukhothai (Q)	31	13	6	12	50	44	+6	45	2017 AFC Champions League preliminary round 2 (Note: Qualified as drawn winners of the 2016 Thai FA Cup.)

Updated to match(es) played on 25 September 2016. Source: Thai League
Rules for classification: 1) points; 2) goal difference; 3) number of goals scored.
(Q) Qualified for the phase indicated

== AFC Champions League ==
Date	Opponents	H / A	Result F–A	Scorers	Round
2 February 2016	(Myanmar) Yangon United	H	3–2 (a.e.t.)	Anderson 63', Suttinan 81', Kroekrit 105+1'	Preliminary round 2
9 February 2016	(Japan) FC Tokyo	A	0–9		Play-off round

== Thai FA Cup ==
Chang FA Cup

Date	Opponents	H / A	Result F–A	Scorers	Round
15 June 2016	Singburi Bang Rachan	A	2–0	Assumpção 59', Nurul 88'	Round of 64
13 July 2016	Nong Bua Pitchaya	H	4–2	Anderson 8', Prachya 18' (o.g.), Assumpção (2) 76', 84'	Round of 32
3 August 2016	Rayong	A	4–1	Rodrigo 17', Assumpção (2) 37', 47', Pipob 79'	Round of 16
21 September 2016	SCG Muangthong United	N (Note: 14 September 2016, Fans of SCG Muangthong United and fans of Port had clashed, so both can't use their home stadium had suspended.)	3–0	Assumpção (2) 55' (pen.), 56', Rodrigo 87'	Quarter-finals
2 November 2016	Chainat Hornbill	N	Shared		Semi-finals

== Thai League Cup ==
Toyota League Cup

Date	Opponents	H / A	Result F–A	Scorers	Round
9 April 2016	Samut Sakhon	A	4–1	Assumpção (2) 8', 47', Prakit 62', Songwut 72' (o.g.)	Round of 64
8 June 2016	Air Force Central	A	1–1 (a.e.t.) (5–4p)	Naruphol 66'	Round of 32
6 July 2016	Sisaket	H	1–2 (a.e.t.)	Rodrigo 72' (pen.)	Round of 16

== Squad goals statistics ==
No.	Pos.	Name	League	FA Cup	League Cup	Asia	Total
1	GK	(Thailand) Tanachai Noorach	0	0	0	0	0
2	DF	(Thailand) Noppanon Kachaplayuk	0	0	0	0	0
4	MF	(Thailand) Kroekrit Thaweekarn	2	0	0	1	3
5	DF	(South Korea) Kim Jong-pil	2	0	0	0	2
6	DF	(Thailand) Suttinan Phuk-hom	1	0	0	1	2
7	FW	(Brazil) Leandro Assumpção	11	7	2	0	20
8	MF	(Thailand) Therdsak Chaiman (vc)	0	0	0	0	0
10	FW	(Thailand) Pipob On-Mo	0	1	0	0	1
13	MF	(Thailand) Nurul Sriyankem	2	1	0	0	3
16	DF	(Thailand) Alongkorn Prathumwong	0	0	0	0	0
17	MF	(Thailand) Naruphol Ar-Romsawa	0	0	1	0	1
18	MF	(Thailand) Adul Lahsoh	0	0	0	0	0
19	MF	(Thailand) Narong Jansawek	2	0	0	0	2
21	MF	(Thailand) Prakit Deeprom	6	0	1	0	7
22	MF	(Thailand) Pokklaw Anan	4	0	0	0	4
23	FW	(Brazil) Rodrigo Vergilio	12	2	1	0	15
24	MF	(Thailand) Worachit Kanitsribampen	0	0	0	0	0
25	DF	(Thailand) Chonlatit Jantakam	0	0	0	0	0
26	DF	(Brazil) Anderson dos Santos	1	1	0	1	3
27	FW	(Thailand) Boonkerd Chaiyasin	0	0	0	0	0
28	FW	(Thailand) Sittichok Phaso	0	0	0	0	0
29	FW	(Ghana) Prince Amponsah	8	0	0	0	8
30	GK	(Thailand) Chakhon Philakhlang	0	0	0	0	0
33	MF	(Thailand) Phanuphong Phonsa	1	0	0	0	1
35	GK	(Thailand) Chanin Sae-ear	0	0	0	0	0
36	DF	(Thailand) Arthit Kansangwet	0	0	0	0	0
38	MF	(Thailand) Panudech Maiwong	0	0	0	0	0
39	FW	(Thailand) Saharat Sontisawat	0	0	0	0	0
Out on loan
–	MF	(Thailand) Warut Supphaso	0	0	0	0	0
–	FW	(Thailand) Krit Phavaputanon	0	0	0	0	0
–	DF	(Thailand) Tiwa Nueaket	0	0	0	0	0
Left club during season
–	DF	(Thailand) Korrakot Wiriyaudomsiri	0	0	0	0	0
–	MF	(South Korea) Kim Chul-ho	0	0	0	0	0

== Transfers ==
First Thai footballer's market is opening on 14 December 2015 to 28 January 2016
Second Thai footballer's market is opening on 3 June 2016 to 30 June 2016

=== In ===
Date	Pos.	Name	From
25 December 2015	MF	(Thailand) Narong Jansawek	(Thailand) Bangkok Glass
26 December 2015	MF	(Thailand) Panupong Phonsa	(Thailand) TOT
26 December 2015	FW	(Brazil) Rodrigo Vergilio	(Thailand) Navy
31 December 2015	GK	(Thailand) Tanachai Noorach	(Thailand) Khon Kaen United
15 January 2016	MF	(South Korea) Kim Chul-ho	(South Korea) Seongnam
16 January 2016	FW	(Thailand) Krit Phavaputanon	(Thailand) Sisaket United
27 January 2016	MF	(Thailand) Pokklaw Anan	(Thailand) Police United
26 June 2016	MF	(Thailand) Prakit Deeprom	(Thailand) Buriram United
15 July 2016	DF	(Thailand) Adisak Hantes	(Thailand) Nakhon Ratchasima Mazda

=== Out ===
Date	Pos.	Name	To
6 December 2015	MF	(Thailand) Adul Lahsoh	(Thailand) Buriram United
16 December 2015	FW	(Timor-Leste) Thiago Cunha	(Thailand) Port
16 December 2015	MF	(Brazil) Juliano Mineiro	(Japan) Kashiwa Reysol
18 December 2015	MF	(Thailand) Phuritad Jarikanon	(Thailand) PTT Rayong
25 December 2015	GK	(Thailand) Sinthaweechai Hathairattanakool	(Thailand) Suphanburi
26 December 2015	DF	(Thailand) Rachanon Kanyathong	(Thailand) PTT Rayong
11 January 2016	DF	(South Korea) Cho Byung-kuk	(South Korea) Incheon United
25 January 2016	FW	(Thailand) Sukree Etae	(Thailand) Sisaket
25 January 2016	DF	(Thailand) Wisarut Waingan	(Thailand) Prachuap
2 February 2016	GK	(Thailand) Watthanapong Tabutda	(Thailand) Thai Honda Ladkrabang
2 February 2016	DF	(Thailand) Niweat Siriwong	(Thailand) Ayutthaya Warrior
18 June 2016	DF	(Thailand) Korrakot Wiriyaudomsiri	(Thailand) Buriram United
15 July 2016	MF	(South Korea) Kim Chul-ho	(South Korea) Suwon

=== Loan in ===
Date from	Date to	Pos.	Name	From
26 December 2015	26 June 2016	MF	(Thailand) Prakit Deeprom	(Thailand) Buriram United
26 December 2015	31 December 2016	MF	(Thailand) Naruphol Ar-Romsawa	(Thailand) Buriram United
13 January 2016	31 December 2016	MF	(South Korea) Kim Jong-pil	(Japan) Shonan Bellmare
9 June 2016	31 December 2016	MF	(Thailand) Adul Lahsoh	(Thailand) Buriram United
1 July 2016	31 December 2016	DF	(Thailand) Nattapon Malapun	(Thailand) Buriram United

=== Loan out ===
Date from	Date to	Pos.	Name	To
26 December 2015	31 December 2016	FW	(Thailand) Boonkerd Chaiyasin	(Thailand) Pattaya United
15 July 2016	31 December 2016	DF	(Thailand) Krit Phavaputanon	(Thailand) Nong Bua Pitchaya
15 July 2016	31 December 2016	DF	(Thailand) Tiwa Nueaket	(Thailand) Phan Thong
15 July 2016	31 December 2016	MF	(Thailand) Warut Supphaso	(Thailand) Prachuap
