= Thailand national football team results (2010–2019) =

This article lists the results for the Thailand national football team between 2010 and 2019.

- Only record the results that affect the FIFA/Coca-Cola World Ranking. See FIFA 'A' matches criteria.

Win Draw Loss

== 2010 ==
6 January 2010 Asian Cup Q	Thailand	0–0	Jordan	Bangkok, Thailand
19:00 UTC+7		Report		Stadium: Rajamangala Stadium; Attendance: 15,000; Referee: Ben Williams (Australia)

17 January 2010 King's Cup	Thailand	1–0	Singapore	Nakhon Ratchasima, Thailand
18:30 UTC+7	Sutee 60'			Stadium: 80th Birthday Stadium

20 January 2010 King's Cup	Poland	3–1	Thailand	Nakhon Ratchasima, Thailand
18:30 UTC+7	Glik 43'; Małecki 52'; Robak 87'		Therdsak 90' (pen.)	Stadium: 80th Birthday Stadium

23 January 2010 King's Cup	Thailand	0–3	Denmark	Nakhon Ratchasima, Thailand
18:45 UTC+7			Lekic 19'; Absalonsen 37'; Bernburg 86'	Stadium: 80th Birthday Stadium

3 March 2010 Asian Cup Q	Iran	1–0	Thailand	Tehran, Iran
19:30 UTC+3:30	Nekounam 90'	Report		Stadium: Azadi Stadium; Attendance: 17,000; Referee: Abdullah Balideh (Qatar)

16 May 2010 Friendly	South Africa	4–0	Thailand	Nelspruit, South Africa
--:-- UTC+2	Tshabalala 22'; Mphela 30', 33'; Parker 90'			Stadium: Mbombela Stadium

11 August 2010 Friendly	Thailand	1–0	Singapore	Nonthaburi, Thailand
--:-- UTC+7	Sarayoot 28'			Stadium: SCG Stadium

4 September 2010 Friendly	Thailand	1–0	India	Nonthaburi, Thailand
--:-- UTC+7	Sarayoot 72'			Stadium: SCG Stadium

8 September 2010 Friendly	India	1–2	Thailand	New Delhi, India
--:-- UTC+5:30	Kawin 54' (o.g.)		Teeratep 48'; Keerati 64'	Stadium: Ambedkar Stadium

1 December 2010 AFF GS	Thailand	2–2	Laos	Jakarta, Indonesia
17:00 UTC+7	Sarayuth 67', 90'	Report	Inthammavong 53'; Sysomvang 81'	Stadium: Gelora Bung Karno Stadium; Referee: Ryuji Sato (Japan)

4 December 2010 AFF GS	Thailand	0–0	Malaysia	Jakarta, Indonesia
17:00 UTC+7		Report		Stadium: Gelora Bung Karno Stadium; Referee: Win Cho (Myanmar)

7 December 2010 AFF GS	Indonesia	2–1	Thailand	Jakarta, Indonesia
19:30 UTC+7	Bambang 82' (pen.), 90+1' (pen.)	Report	Suree 69'	Stadium: Gelora Bung Karno Stadium; Referee: Ryuji Sato (Japan)

== 2011 ==
14 July 2011 Friendly	Thailand	1–0	Myanmar	Buriram, Thailand
--:-- UTC+7	Dangda 3'			Stadium: New I-mobile Stadium

15 July 2011 Friendly	Thailand	1–1	Myanmar	Buriram, Thailand
--:-- UTC+7	Jakkapan 16'		Pai Soe 63'	Stadium: New I-mobile Stadium

23 July 2011 World Cup Q	Thailand	1–0	Palestine	Buriram, Thailand
18:00 UTC+7	Kaewprom 18'	Report		Stadium: New I-mobile Stadium; Attendance: 17,000; Referee: Lee Min-Hu (South Korea)

28 July 2011 World Cup Q	Palestine	2–2	Thailand	Al-Ram, Palestine
18:00 UTC+3	Alyan 5', 90'	Report	Thonglao 34', 90+3'	Stadium: Faisal Al-Husseini International Stadium; Attendance: 11,500; Referee: Salah Abbas Alabbasi (Bahrain)

24 August 2011 Friendly	Thailand	0–0	Singapore	Bangkok, Thailand
--:-- UTC+7				Stadium: Rajamangala Stadium

2 September 2011 World Cup Q	Australia	2–1	Thailand	Brisbane, Australia
20:06 UTC+10	Kennedy 58'; Brosque 86'	Report	Teerasil 15'	Stadium: Suncorp Stadium; Attendance: 24,540; Referee: Abdullah Balideh (Qatar)

6 September 2011 World Cup Q	Thailand	3–0	Oman	Bangkok, Thailand
18:00 UTC+7	Soleb 35'; Dangda 41'; Al Farsi 90+1' (o.g.)	Report		Stadium: Rajamangala Stadium; Attendance: 19,000; Referee: Kim Dong Jin (South Korea)

6 October 2011 Friendly	Thailand	0–0	Jordan	Bangkok, Thailand
--:-- UTC+7				Stadium: Rajamangala Stadium

11 October 2011 World Cup Q	Thailand	0–0	Saudi Arabia	Bangkok, Thailand
18:00 UTC+7		Report		Stadium: Rajamangala Stadium; Attendance: 42,000; Referee: Ravshan Irmatov (Uzbekistan)

11 November 2011 World Cup Q	Saudi Arabia	3–0	Thailand	Riyadh, Saudi Arabia
19:30 UTC+3	Hazazi 59'; Al-Fraidi 80'; Noor 89' (pen.)	Report		Stadium: King Fahd International Stadium; Attendance: 32,500; Referee: Liu Kwok Man (Hong Kong)

15 November 2011 World Cup Q	Thailand	0–1	Australia	Bangkok, Thailand
18:00 UTC+7		Report	Holman 77'	Stadium: Suphachalasai Stadium; Attendance: 19,400; Referee: Saeid Mozaffarizadeh (Iran)

== 2012 ==
18 January 2012 King's Cup	Thailand	0–1	Norway	Bangkok, Thailand
19:00 UTC+7		Report	Reginiussen 84'	Stadium: Rajamangala Stadium; Referee: Yudai Yamamoto (Japan)

24 February 2012 Friendly	Thailand	3–0	Maldives	Chiang Mai, Thailand
--:-- UTC+7	Chatree 31'; Teerasil 53'; Datsakorn 72'			Stadium: 700th Anniversary Stadium

29 February 2012 World Cup Q	Oman	2–0	Thailand	Muscat, Oman
13:30 UTC+4	Al-Hadhri 8'; Al-Muqbali 90+2'	Report		Stadium: Sultan Qaboos Sports Complex; Attendance: 22,000; Referee: Masaaki Toma (Japan)

7 November 2012 Friendly	Thailand	2–0	Malaysia	Nonthaburi, Thailand
--:-- UTC+7	Prayad 25'; Arthit 80'			Stadium: SCG Stadium

14 November 2012 Friendly	Thailand	5–0	Bhutan	Bangkok, Thailand
--:-- UTC+7	Apipoo 5', 6', 35'; Napat 28'; Rattana 49'			Stadium: Thai-Japanese Stadium

17 November 2012 Friendly	Thailand	5–0	Bangladesh	Bangkok, Thailand
--:-- UTC+7	Pichitphong 5'; Teerasil 12', 20', 52'; Napat 74'			Stadium: Rajamangala Stadium

24 November 2012 AFF GS	Thailand	2–1	Philippines	Bangkok, Thailand
20:20 UTC+7	Jakkraphan 39'; Anucha 41'	Report	Mulders 77'	Stadium: Rajamangala Stadium; Referee: Ryuji Sato (Japan)

27 November 2012 AFF GS	Myanmar	0–4	Thailand	Bangkok, Thailand
20:20 UTC+7		Report	Teerasil 20', 82', 89'; Apipoo 59'	Stadium: Rajamangala Stadium; Referee: Yaqoob Abdul Baki (Oman)

30 November 2012 AFF GS	Thailand	3–1	Vietnam	Bangkok, Thailand
20:20 UTC+7	Kirati 21', 65'; Nguyễn Gia Từ 82' (o.g.)	Report	Nguyễn Văn Quyết 72'	Stadium: Rajamangala Stadium; Referee: Ryuji Sato (Japan)

9 December 2012 AFF SF	Malaysia	1–1	Thailand	Kuala Lumpur, Malaysia
20:00 UTC+8	Norshahrul 48'	Report	Teerasil 78'	Stadium: Bukit Jalil National Stadium; Referee: Mohsen Torky (Iran)

13 December 2012 AFF SF	Thailand	2–0	Malaysia	Bangkok, Thailand
20:20 UTC+7	Teerasil 60'; Theeraton 65'	Report		Stadium: Supachalasai Stadium; Referee: Lee Min-Hu (South Korea)

19 December 2012 AFF F	Singapore	3–1	Thailand	Jalan Besar, Singapore
20:00 UTC+8	Fahrudin 10' (pen.); Amri 72'; Baihakki 90+1'	Report	Adul 65'	Stadium: Jalan Besar Stadium; Referee: Masaaki Toma (Japan)

22 December 2012 AFF F	Thailand	1–0	Singapore	Bangkok, Thailand
19:00 UTC+7	Kirati 45'	Report		Stadium: Supachalasai Stadium; Referee: Ravshan Irmatov (Uzbekistan)

== 2013 ==
6 February 2013 Asian Cup Q	Thailand	1–3	Kuwait	Bangkok, Thailand
19:00 UTC+7	Chanathip 76'	Report	Theeraton 25' (o.g.); Fadel 59'; Aman 65'	Stadium: Rajamangala Stadium; Attendance: 15,000; Referee: Ryuji Sato (Japan)

22 March 2013 Asian Cup Q	Lebanon	5–2	Thailand	Beirut, Lebanon
17:30 UTC+2	Chaito 6', 22'; Haidar 31'; Maatouk 72'; Onika 90+1'	Report	Thitipan 49', 85'	Stadium: Camille Chamoun Sports City Stadium; Attendance: 7,000; Referee: Kim Dong-Jin (South Korea)

15 June 2013 Friendly	China	1–5	Thailand	Hefei, China
--:-- UTC+8	Wang Yongpo 34' (pen.)	Report	Pokklaw 16'; Adisak 23', 51'; Chanathip 61'; Sarawut 87'	Stadium: Hefei Olympic Sports Centre Stadium

15 October 2013 Asian Cup Q	Iran	2–1	Thailand	Tehran, Iran
19:00 UTC+3:30	Hosseini 67'; Ghoochannejhad 70'	Report	Teerasil 80'	Stadium: Azadi Stadium; Attendance: 17,330; Referee: Abdullah Balideh (Qatar)

15 November 2013 Asian Cup Q	Thailand	0–3	Iran	Bangkok, Thailand
19:00 UTC+7		Report	Dejagah 28'; Ghoochannejhad 42'; Jahanbakhsh 90+5'	Stadium: Rajamangala Stadium; Attendance: 7,000; Referee: Ben Williams (Australia)

19 November 2013 Asian Cup Q	Kuwait	3–1	Thailand	Kuwait City, Kuwait
18:35 UTC+3	Nasser 19', 71'; Awadh 56' (pen.)	Report	Mongkol 68'	Stadium: Al Kuwait Sports Club Stadium; Attendance: 5,000; Referee: Valentin Kovalenko (Uzbekistan)

== 2014 ==
5 March 2014 Asian Cup Q	Thailand	2–5	Lebanon	Bangkok, Thailand
21:00 UTC+7	Teeratep 23' (pen.); Adisak 76'	Report	Ghaddar 2'; Maatouk 18', 46'; Saad 45+1'; Antar 63'	Stadium: Rajamangala Stadium; Attendance: 5,000; Referee: Yudai Yamamoto (Japan)

25 May 2014 Friendly	Thailand	1–1	Kuwait	Bangkok, Thailand
--:-- UTC+7	Charyl 68'		Alenezi 45'	Stadium: Rajamangala Stadium

10 October 2014 Friendly	China	3–0	Thailand	Wuhan, China
--:-- UTC+8	Sinthaweechai 63' (o.g.); Sun Ke 83'; Yang Xu 88'	Report		Stadium: Wuhan Sports Centre Stadium

9 November 2014 Friendly	Thailand	3–0	Philippines	Nakhon Ratchasima, Thailand
19:00 UTC+7	Mongkol 30'; Prakit 54'; Kroekrit 75'			Stadium: 80th Birthday Anniversary Stadium

18 November 2014 Friendly	Thailand	2–0	New Zealand	Nakhon Ratchasima, Thailand
19:00 UTC+7	Kirati 44'; Adisak 77'			Stadium: 80th Birthday Anniversary Stadium

23 November 2014 AFF GS	Singapore	1–2	Thailand	Kallang, Singapore
20:10 UTC+8	Khairul 20'		Mongkol 9'; Charyl 89' (pen.)	Stadium: National Stadium; Referee: Alireza Faghani (Iran)

26 November 2014 AFF GS	Malaysia	2–3	Thailand	Kallang, Singapore
19:30 UTC+8	Amri 28'; Safiq 61'		Adisak 43', 90'; Charyl 72'	Stadium: National Stadium; Referee: Ahmed Al-Kaf (Oman)

29 November 2014 AFF GS	Thailand	2–0	Myanmar	Kallang, Singapore
20:00 UTC+8	Tanaboon 12'; Prakit 84'			Stadium: Jalan Besar Stadium; Referee: Çarymurat Kurbanow (Turkmenistan)

6 December 2014 AFF SF	Philippines	0–0	Thailand	Manila, Philippines
20:00 UTC+8				Stadium: Rizal Memorial Stadium; Referee: Abdullah Balideh (Qatar)

10 December 2014 AFF SF	Thailand	3–0	Philippines	Bangkok, Thailand
19:00 UTC+7	Chanathip 6'; Kroekrit 57', 86'			Stadium: Rajamangala Stadium; Referee: Kim Sang-woo (South Korea)

17 December 2014 AFF F	Thailand	2–0	Malaysia	Bangkok, Thailand
19:00 UTC+7	Charyl 72' (pen.); Kroekrit 86'			Stadium: Rajamangala Stadium; Referee: Valentin Kovalenko (Uzbekistan)

20 December 2014 AFF F	Malaysia	3–2	Thailand	Kuala Lumpur, Malaysia
20:00 UTC+8	Safiq 7' (pen.), 58'; Putra 45+2'		Charyl 82'; Chanathip 87'	Stadium: Bukit Jalil National Stadium; Referee: Alireza Faghani (Iran)

== 2015 ==
26 March 2015 Friendly	Thailand	2–0	Singapore	Nakhon Ratchasima, Thailand
19:00 UTC+7	Suttinan 87'; Pokklaw 90+1'	Report		Stadium: 80th Birthday Anniversary Stadium; Attendance: 15,320; Referee: Hettikamkanamge Perera (Sri Lanka)

30 March 2015 Friendly	Thailand	2–3	Cameroon	Bangkok, Thailand
19:00 UTC+7	Deeporm 15'; Chedjou 33' (o.g.)	Report	Moukandjo 42'; N'Jie 77' (pen.); Ndassi 88'	Stadium: Rajamangala Stadium; Referee: Hettikamkanamge Perera (Sri Lanka)

20 May 2015 Friendly	Thailand	0–1	North Korea	Bangkok, Thailand
19:00 UTC+7		Report	Ri Hyok-chol 20'	Stadium: Rajamangala Stadium; Referee: Teetichai Nuanjan (Thailand)

24 May 2015 World Cup Q	Thailand	1–0	Vietnam	Bangkok, Thailand
19:00 UTC+7	Pokkhao 81'	Report (FIFA); Report (AFC)		Stadium: Rajamangala Stadium; Attendance: 40,500; Referee: Ben Williams (Australia)

5 June 2015 Friendly	Thailand	1–1	Bahrain	Bangkok, Thailand
19:00 UTC+7	Jakkraphan 52'	Report	Sayed Ali Eissa 81'	Stadium: Rajamangala Stadium; Referee: Phùng Đình Dũng (Vietnam)

16 June 2015 World Cup Q	Chinese Taipei	0–2	Thailand	Taipei, Taiwan
19:30 UTC+8		Report (FIFA); Report (AFC)	Teerasil 21', 39'	Stadium: Taipei Municipal Stadium; Attendance: 18,168; Referee: Ali Shaban (Kuwait)

3 September 2015 Friendly	Thailand	2–0	Afghanistan	Bangkok, Thailand
19:30 UTC+7	Mongkol 28'; Teerasil 59'	Report		Stadium: Rajamangala Stadium; Referee: Phùng Đình Dũng (Vietnam)

8 September 2015 World Cup Q	Thailand	2–2	Iraq	Bangkok, Thailand
19:00 UTC+7	Theerathon 80' (pen.); Mongkol 83'	Report (FIFA); Report (AFC)	Meram 34'; Mahmoud 49'	Stadium: Rajamangala Stadium; Attendance: 43,572; Referee: Masaaki Toma (Japan)

8 October 2015 Friendly	Thailand	1–0	Hong Kong	Bangkok, Thailand
19:00 UTC+7	Theerathon 90+5' (pen.)	Report		Stadium: Rajamangala Stadium; Referee: Nguyễn Hiền Triết (Vietnam)

13 October 2015 World Cup Q	Vietnam	0–3	Thailand	Hanoi, Vietnam
19:00 UTC+7		Report (FIFA); Report (AFC)	Kroekrit 29'; Đinh Tiến Thành 56' (o.g.); Theerathon 70'	Stadium: Mỹ Đình National Stadium; Attendance: 35,000; Referee: Nawaf Shukralla (Bahrain)

12 November 2015 World Cup Q	Thailand	4–2	Chinese Taipei	Bangkok, Thailand
19:00 UTC+7	Teerasil 41'; Pokklaw 52'; Adisak 72'; Tana 74'	Report (FIFA); Report (AFC)	Yen 3'; Hung Kai-chun 65'	Stadium: Rajamangala Stadium; Attendance: 50,000; Referee: Dmitriy Mashentsev (Kyrgyzstan)

== 2016 ==
24 March 2016 World Cup Q	Iraq	2–2	Thailand	Tehran, Iran
18:30 UTC+4:30	Kamel 66'; Adnan 90+5'	Report (FIFA); Report (AFC)	Mongkol 39'; Adisak 87'	Stadium: PAS Stadium; Attendance: 4,000; Referee: Abdulrahman Al-Jassim (Qatar)

27 March 2016 Friendly	Thailand	0–1	South Korea	Bangkok, Thailand
19:30 UTC+7		Report	Suk Hyun-jun 4'	Stadium: Supachalasai Stadium; Attendance: 20,000; Referee: Ng Chiu Kok (Hong Kong)

3 June 2016 King's Cup	Thailand	2–2 (7–6 p)	Syria	Bangkok, Thailand
20:00 UTC+7	Teerasil 19'; Mongkol 42'	Report	Maowas 60'; Al Agha 86'	Stadium: Rajamangala Stadium; Referee: Sukhbir Singh (Singapore)
	Penalties
	Theerathon (penalty scored); Sarach (penalty scored); Sanrawat (penalty missed); Tanaboon (penalty scored); Adisak (penalty scored); Tana (penalty scored); Tristan (penalty scored); Mika (penalty scored)		(penalty scored) Al Salih; (penalty scored) Al Nakdali; (penalty scored) Omari; (penalty missed) Maowas; (penalty scored) Al Agha; (penalty scored) Ajan; (penalty scored) Mido; (penalty missed) Al Baour

5 June 2016 King's Cup	Thailand	2–0	Jordan	Bangkok, Thailand
20:00 UTC+7	Kroekrit 52', 80'	Report		Stadium: Rajamangala Stadium; Referee: Nafeez Abdul Wahab (Malaysia)

25 August 2016 Friendly	Qatar	3–0	Thailand	Doha, Qatar
19:00 UTC+3	Al-Haidos 7' (pen.), 78'; Rodrigo 62'	Report		Stadium: Jassim Bin Hamad Stadium; Referee: Ammar Mahfoodh (Bahrain)

1 September 2016 World Cup Q	Saudi Arabia	1–0	Thailand	Riyadh, Saudi Arabia
20:30 UTC+3	Al-Abed 84' (pen.)	Report (FIFA); Report (AFC)		Stadium: King Fahd International Stadium; Attendance: 40,983; Referee: Fu Ming (China)

6 September 2016 World Cup Q	Thailand	0–2	Japan	Bangkok, Thailand
19:15 UTC+7		Report (FIFA); Report (AFC)	Haraguchi 17'; Asano 75'	Stadium: Rajamangala Stadium; Attendance: 44,500; Referee: Mohsen Torky (Iran)

6 October 2016 World Cup Q	United Arab Emirates	3–1	Thailand	Abu Dhabi, United Arab Emirates
20:00 UTC+4	Mabkhout 14', 47'; Khalil 90+3'	Report (FIFA); Report (AFC)	Tana 65'	Stadium: Mohammed Bin Zayed Stadium; Attendance: 18,242; Referee: Liu Kwok Man (Hong Kong)

11 October 2016 World Cup Q	Iraq	4–0	Thailand	Tehran, Iran
16:00 UTC+3:30	Abdul-Raheem 7', 25', 87', 90+4'	Report (FIFA); Report (AFC)		Stadium: PAS Stadium; Attendance: 2,255; Referee: Ma Ning (China)

15 November 2016 World Cup Q	Thailand	2–2	Australia	Bangkok, Thailand
19:00 UTC+7	Teerasil 20', 57' (pen.)	Report (FIFA); Report (AFC)	Jedinak 9' (pen.), 65' (pen.)	Stadium: Rajamangala Stadium; Attendance: 36,534; Referee: Fahad Al-Marri (Qatar)

19 November 2016 AFF GS	Thailand	4–2	Indonesia	Bocaue, Philippines
16:30 UTC+8	Peerapat 4'; Teerasil 36', 79', 90+4'	Report	Boaz 53'; Lerby 56'	Stadium: Philippine Sports Stadium; Attendance: 1,153; Referee: Valentin Kovalenko (Uzbekistan)

22 November 2016 AFF GS	Thailand	1–0	Singapore	Bocaue, Philippines
16:30 UTC+8	Sarawut 89'	Report		Stadium: Philippine Sports Stadium; Attendance: 359; Referee: Rowan Arumughan (India)

25 November 2016 AFF GS	Philippines	0–1	Thailand	Bocaue, Philippines
20:00 UTC+8		Report	Sarawut 81'	Stadium: Philippine Sports Stadium; Attendance: 3,185; Referee: Valentin Kovalenko (Uzbekistan)

4 December 2016 AFF SF	Myanmar	0–2	Thailand	Yangon, Myanmar
18:00 UTC+6:30		Report	Teerasil 24', 55'	Stadium: Thuwunna Stadium; Attendance: 33,122; Referee: Ilgiz Tantashev (Uzbekistan)

8 December 2016 AFF SF	Thailand	4–0	Myanmar	Bangkok, Thailand
19:00 UTC+7	Sarawut 33'; Theerathon 66' (pen.); Siroch 76'; Chanathip 83'	Report		Stadium: Rajamangala Stadium; Attendance: 43,638; Referee: Adham Makhadmeh (Jordan)

14 December 2016 AFF F	Indonesia	2–1	Thailand	Bogor, Indonesia
19:00 UTC+7	Rizky 65'; Hansamu 70'	Report	Teerasil 33'	Stadium: Pakansari Stadium; Attendance: 30,000; Referee: Jumpei Iida (Japan)

17 December 2016 AFF F	Thailand	2–0	Indonesia	Bangkok, Thailand
19:00 UTC+7	Siroch 38', 47'	Report		Stadium: Rajamangala Stadium; Attendance: 48,000; Referee: Abdulla Hassan (United Arab Emirates)

23 December 2016 Friendly	Thailand	0–0	Vietnam	Pathum Thani, Thailand
20:00 UTC+7				Stadium: BG Stadium; Attendance: 0 Referee: Ravshan Irmatov (Uzbekistan)

== 2017 ==
23 March 2017 World Cup Q	Thailand	0–3	Saudi Arabia	Bangkok, Thailand
19:00 UTC+7		Report(FIFA); Report(AFC)	Al-Sahlawi 26'; Tanaboon 84' (o.g.); Al-Moasher 90'	Stadium: Rajamangala Stadium; Attendance: 41,613; Referee: Ali Abdulnabi (Bahrain)

28 March 2017 World Cup Q	Japan	4–0	Thailand	Saitama, Japan
19:35 UTC+9	Kagawa 8'; Okazaki 19'; Kubo 57'; Yoshida 83'	Report (FIFA); Report (AFC)		Stadium: Saitama Stadium 2002; Attendance: 59,003; Referee: Kim Dong-jin (South Korea)

6 June 2017 Friendly	Uzbekistan	2–0	Thailand	Tashkent, Uzbekistan
20:00 UTC+5	Abdukholiqov 67'; Rashidov 90+2'	Report		Stadium: Bunyodkor Stadium; Referee: Sherzod Kasimov (Uzbekistan)

13 June 2017 World Cup Q	Thailand	1–1	United Arab Emirates	Bangkok, Thailand
19:00 UTC+7	Mongkol 69'	Report (FIFA); Report (AFC)	Mabkhout 90+3'	Stadium: Rajamangala Stadium; Attendance: 24,417; Referee: Muhammad Taqi (Singapore)

14 July 2017 King's Cup	Thailand	3–0	North Korea	Bangkok, Thailand
19:30 UTC+7	Mongkol 41'; Thitipan 78'; Teeratep 90+1' (pen.)	Report		Stadium: Rajamangala Stadium; Referee: Yusuke Araki (Japan)

16 July 2017 King's Cup	Belarus	0–0 (4–5 p)	Thailand	Bangkok, Thailand
19:30 UTC+7		Report		Stadium: Rajamangala Stadium; Referee: Yusuke Araki (Japan)
	Penalties
	Savitski (penalty scored); Klopotskiy (penalty missed); Salavey (penalty scored); Shevchenko (penalty scored); Volkov (penalty scored); Skitaw (penalty missed)		(penalty scored) Teeratep; (penalty missed) Peerapat; (penalty scored) Roller; (penalty scored) Thitipan; (penalty scored) Theerathon; (penalty scored) Siroch

31 August 2017 World Cup Q	Thailand	1–2	Iraq	Bangkok, Thailand
19:00 UTC+7	Ibrahim 63' (o.g.)	Report (FIFA); Report (AFC)	Meram 34'; Abdul-Amir 85' (pen.)	Stadium: Rajamangala Stadium; Attendance: 22,604; Referee: Nawaf Shukralla (Bahrain)

5 September 2017 World Cup Q	Australia	2–1	Thailand	Melbourne, Australia
20:00 UTC+10	Juric 69'; Leckie 86'	Report (FIFA); Report (AFC)	Pokklaw 82'	Stadium: Melbourne Rectangular Stadium; Attendance: 26,393; Referee: Liu Kwok Man (Hong Kong)

5 October 2017 Friendly	Myanmar	1–3	Thailand	Mandalay, Myanmar
18:30 UTC+6:30	Aung Thu 50'	Report	Mongkol 12'; Teerasil 32'; Thitipan 79' (pen.)	Stadium: Mandalarthiri Stadium; Referee: Lim Bunthoeun (Cambodia)

8 October 2017 Friendly	Thailand	1–0	Kenya	Nonthaburi, Thailand
19:30 UTC+7	Teerasil 62'	Report		Stadium: SCG Stadium; Referee: Win Htut (Myanmar)

== 2018 ==
22 March 2018 King's Cup	Thailand	0–0 (4–2 p)	Gabon	Bangkok, Thailand
19:30 UTC+7		Report		Stadium: Rajamangala Stadium; Attendance: 25,781; Referee: Suhaizi Shukri (Malaysia)
	Penalties
	Theerathon (penalty scored); Teerasil (penalty scored); Peerapat (penalty missed); Roller (penalty scored); Pansa (penalty scored)		(penalty missed) Biyogo Poko; (penalty missed) Méyé; (penalty scored) Martinsson Ngouali; (penalty scored) Bulot

25 March 2018 King's Cup	Thailand	2–3	Slovakia	Bangkok, Thailand
19:30 UTC+7	Jakkaphan 42'; Pansa 79'	Report	Duda 10'; Mak 34'; Pačinda 68'	Stadium: Rajamangala Stadium; Attendance: 45,425; Referee: Suhaizi Shukri (Malaysia)

2 June 2018 Friendly	Thailand	0–2	China	Bangkok, Thailand
18:30 UTC+7		Report	Wu Lei 34', 74'	Stadium: Rajamangala Stadium; Attendance: 23,750; Referee: Gopala Krishnan Letchman (Singapore)

11 October 2018 Friendly	Hong Kong	0–1	Thailand	Mong Kok, Hong Kong
20:00 UTC+8		Report	Roller 2'	Stadium: Mong Kok Stadium; Attendance: 4,740; Referee: Kim Dae-yong (South Korea)

14 October 2018 Friendly	Thailand	1–0	Trinidad and Tobago	Suphan Buri, Thailand
18:00 UTC+7	Thitipan 66'	Report		Stadium: Suphan Buri Provincial Stadium; Attendance: 15,059; Referee: Jansen Foo Chuan Hui (Singapore)

9 November 2018 AFF GS	Timor-Leste	0–7	Thailand	Bangkok, Thailand
19:00 UTC+7		Report (AFFSZ); Report (AFF)	Adisak 3', 13', 31', 45', 50', 57' (pen.); Supachai 90+1'	Stadium: Rajamangala Stadium; Attendance: 8,764; Referee: Nazmi Nasaruddin (Malaysia)

17 November 2018 AFF GS	Thailand	4–2	Indonesia	Bangkok, Thailand
18:30 UTC+7	Korrakot 38'; Pansa 45+2'; Adisak 65'; Pokklaw 74'	Report (AFFSZ); Report (AFF)	Zulfiandi 29'; Fachrudin 89'	Stadium: Rajamangala Stadium; Attendance: 37,570; Referee: Amirul Izwan Yaacob (Malaysia)

21 November 2018 AFF GS	Philippines	1–1	Thailand	Bacolod, Philippines
19:30 UTC+8	Bedic 81'	Report (AFFSZ); Report (AFF)	Supachai 56'	Stadium: Panaad Stadium; Attendance: 3,522; Referee: Nagor Amir Noor Mohamed (Malaysia)

25 November 2018 AFF GS	Thailand	3–0	Singapore	Bangkok, Thailand
19:00 UTC+7	Pansa 13'; Supachai 23'; Adisak 90'	Report (AFFSZ); Report (AFF)		Stadium: Rajamangala Stadium; Attendance: 29,763; Referee: Ahmed Faisal Ali (Jordan)

1 December 2018 AFF SF	Malaysia	0–0	Thailand	Kuala Lumpur, Malaysia
20:45 UTC+8		Report (AFFSZ); Report (AFF)		Stadium: Bukit Jalil National Stadium; Attendance: 87,545; Referee: Ahmed Al-Kaf (Oman)

5 December 2018 AFF SF	Thailand	2–2	Malaysia	Bangkok, Thailand
19:00 UTC+7	Irfan 21' (o.g.); Pansa 63'	Report (AFFSZ); Report (AFF)	Syahmi 28'; Norshahrul 71'	Stadium: Rajamangala Stadium; Attendance: 46,157; Referee: Adham Makhadmeh (Jordan)

== 2019 ==
2 January 2019 Friendly	Oman	2–0	Thailand	Abu Dhabi, United Arab Emirates
18:00 UTC+4	Mubarak 25' (pen.); Al-Ghassani 55'	Report		Stadium: Sheikh Zayed Cricket Stadium

6 January 2019 Asian Cup GS	Thailand	1–4	India	Abu Dhabi, United Arab Emirates
17:30 UTC+4	Teerasil 33'	Report		Stadium: Al Nahyan Stadium; Attendance: 3,250; Referee: Liu Kwok Man (Hong Kong)

10 January 2019 Asian Cup GS	Bahrain	0–1	Thailand	Dubai, United Arab Emirates
15:00 UTC+4		Report	Chanathip 58'	Stadium: Al Maktoum Stadium; Attendance: 2,720; Referee: Chris Beath (Australia)

14 January 2019 Asian Cup GS	United Arab Emirates	1–1	Thailand	Al Ain, United Arab Emirates
20:00 UTC+4		Report	Thitipan 41'	Stadium: Hazza bin Zayed Stadium; Attendance: 17,809; Referee: Ryuji Sato (Japan)

20 January 2019 Asian Cup R16	Thailand	1–2	China	Al Ain, United Arab Emirates
18:00 UTC+4	Supachai 31' Pansa 90+4'	Report		Stadium: Hazza bin Zayed Stadium; Attendance: 8,026; Referee: Mohammed Abdulla Hassan Mohamed (United Arab Emirates)

21 March 2019 China Cup	China	0–1	Thailand	Nanning, China
20:00 UTC+8		Report	Chanathip 33'	Stadium: Guangxi Sports Centre; Attendance: 29,636; Referee: Salman Ahmad Falahi (Qatar)

25 March 2019 China Cup	Thailand	0–4	Uruguay	Nanning, China
19:35 UTC+8		Report	Vecino 6'; Pereiro 38'; Stuani 58'; Gómez 88'	Stadium: Guangxi Sports Centre; Attendance: 29,636; Referee: Ma Ning (China PR)

5 June 2019 King's Cup	Thailand	0–1	Vietnam	Buriram, Thailand
19:45 UTC+7		Report	Nguyễn Anh Đức 90+4'	Stadium: Chang Arena; Referee: Jumpei Iida (Japan)

8 June 2019 King's Cup	India	1–0	Thailand	Buriram, Thailand
15:30 UTC+7	Thapa 17'	Report		Stadium: Chang Arena; Referee: Jumpei Iida (Japan)

5 September 2019 World Cup Q	Thailand	0–0	Vietnam	Pathum Thani, Thailand
19:00 UTC+7		Report (FIFA); Report (AFC)		Stadium: Thammasat Stadium; Attendance: 19,011; Referee: Saoud Al-Adba (Qatar)

10 September 2019 World Cup Q	Indonesia	0–3	Thailand	Jakarta, Indonesia
19:30 UTC+7		Report (FIFA); Report (AFC)	Supachok 55', 71'; Theerathon 63' (pen.)	Stadium: Gelora Bung Karno Stadium; Attendance: 11,600; Referee: Ma Ning (China)

10 October 2019 Friendly	Thailand	1–1	Congo	Pathum Thani, Thailand
19:00 UTC+7	Teerasil 35'	Report	Makouta 60'	Stadium: Leo Stadium; Referee: Sivakorn Pu-udom (Thailand)

15 October 2019 2022 WCQ R2	Thailand	2–1	United Arab Emirates	Pathum Thani, Thailand
19:00 UTC+7	Teerasil 26'; Ekanit 51'	Report (FIFA); Report (AFC)	Mabkhout 45+2'	Stadium: Thammasat Stadium; Attendance: 16,057; Referee: Hettikamkanamge Perera (Sri Lanka)

14 November 2019 2022 WCQ R2	Malaysia	2–1	Thailand	Kuala Lumpur, Malaysia
20:45 UTC+8	Gan 26'; Sumareh 57'	Report (FIFA); Report (AFC)	Chanathip 7'	Stadium: Bukit Jalil National Stadium; Attendance: 39,363; Referee: Ali Sabah (Iraq)

19 November 2019 2022 WCQ R2	Vietnam	0–0	Thailand	Hanoi, Vietnam
20:00 UTC+7		Report (FIFA); Report (AFC)		Stadium: Mỹ Đình National Stadium; Attendance: 40,000; Referee: Ahmed Al-Kaf (Oman)

== Head-to-head record ==
Thailand national football team head-to-head records (2010–2019)
Opponent	Pld	W	D	L	GF	GA	GD	Pts	Confederation
Afghanistan	1	1	0	0	2	0	+2	3	AFC
Australia	4	0	1	3	4	7	–3	1	AFC
Bahrain	2	1	1	0	2	1	+1	4	AFC
Bangladesh	1	1	0	0	5	0	+5	3	AFC
Belarus	1	0	1	0	0	0	0	1	UEFA
Bhutan	1	1	0	0	5	0	+5	3	AFC
Cameroon	1	0	0	1	2	3	–1	0	CAF
China	5	2	0	3	7	8	–1	6	AFC
Congo	1	0	1	0	1	1	0	1	CAF
Denmark	1	0	0	1	0	3	–3	0	UEFA
Gabon	1	0	1	0	0	0	0	1	CAF
Hong Kong	2	2	0	0	2	0	+2	6	AFC
India	4	2	0	2	4	6	–2	6	AFC
Indonesia	6	4	0	2	15	8	+7	12	AFC
Iran	3	0	0	3	1	6	–5	0	AFC
Iraq	4	0	2	2	5	10	–5	2	AFC
Japan	2	0	0	2	0	6	–6	0	AFC
Jordan	3	1	2	0	2	0	+2	5	AFC
Kenya	1	1	0	0	1	0	+1	3	CAF
South Korea	1	0	0	1	0	1	–1	0	AFC
Kuwait	3	0	1	2	3	7	–4	1	AFC
Laos	1	0	1	0	2	2	0	1	AFC
Lebanon	2	0	0	2	4	10	–6	0	AFC
Malaysia	10	4	4	2	15	10	+5	16	AFC
Maldives	1	1	0	0	3	0	+3	3	AFC
Myanmar	7	6	1	0	17	2	+15	19	AFC
New Zealand	1	1	0	0	2	0	+2	3	OFC
North Korea	2	1	0	1	3	1	+2	3	AFC
Norway	1	0	0	1	0	1	–1	0	UEFA
Oman	3	1	0	2	3	4	–1	3	AFC
Palestine	2	1	1	0	3	2	+1	4	AFC
Philippines	6	4	2	0	10	2	+8	14	AFC
Poland	1	0	0	1	1	3	–2	0	UEFA
Qatar	1	0	0	1	0	3	–3	0	AFC
Saudi Arabia	4	0	1	3	0	7	–7	1	AFC
Singapore	9	7	1	1	12	4	+8	22	AFC
Slovakia	1	0	0	1	2	3	–1	0	UEFA
South Africa	1	0	0	1	0	4	–4	0	CAF
Syria	1	0	1	0	2	2	0	1	AFC
Chinese Taipei	2	2	0	0	6	2	+4	6	AFC
Timor-Leste	1	1	0	0	7	0	+7	3	AFC
Trinidad and Tobago	1	1	0	0	1	0	+1	3	CONCACAF
United Arab Emirates	4	1	2	1	5	6	–1	5	AFC
Uruguay	1	0	0	1	0	4	–4	0	CONMEBOL
Uzbekistan	1	0	0	1	0	2	–2	0	AFC
Vietnam	7	3	3	1	7	2	+5	12	AFC
Total	119	50	27	42	166	142	+24	177	
