= Nattawut =

Nattawut or Natthawut (Thai: ณัฐวุฒิ or นัฐวุฒิ, RTGS: Natthawut, pronounced [nát.tʰā.wút]) is a masculine Thai given name. Notable people with the given name include:

- Nattawut Somkhun, Muay Thai fighter
- Nattawut Poonpiriya, Thai director
- Nattawut Saikua, Thai politician
- Nattawut Suksum, Thai footballer
- Nattawut Sombatyotha, Thai footballer
- Nattawut Jaroenboot, Thai footballer
- Nattawut Saengsri, Thai footballer
- Nattawut Munsuwan, Thai footballer
- Nuttawut Khamrin, Thai footballer
- Nattawut Madyalan, Thai futsal player
- Nattawut Innum, Thai long-distance runner
- Nattawut Chootiwat, Thai footballer
- Nattawut Pimpa, Thai gymnast
- Natthawut Skidjai, Thai actor
