= Võ Huy Toàn =

Vietnamese footballer

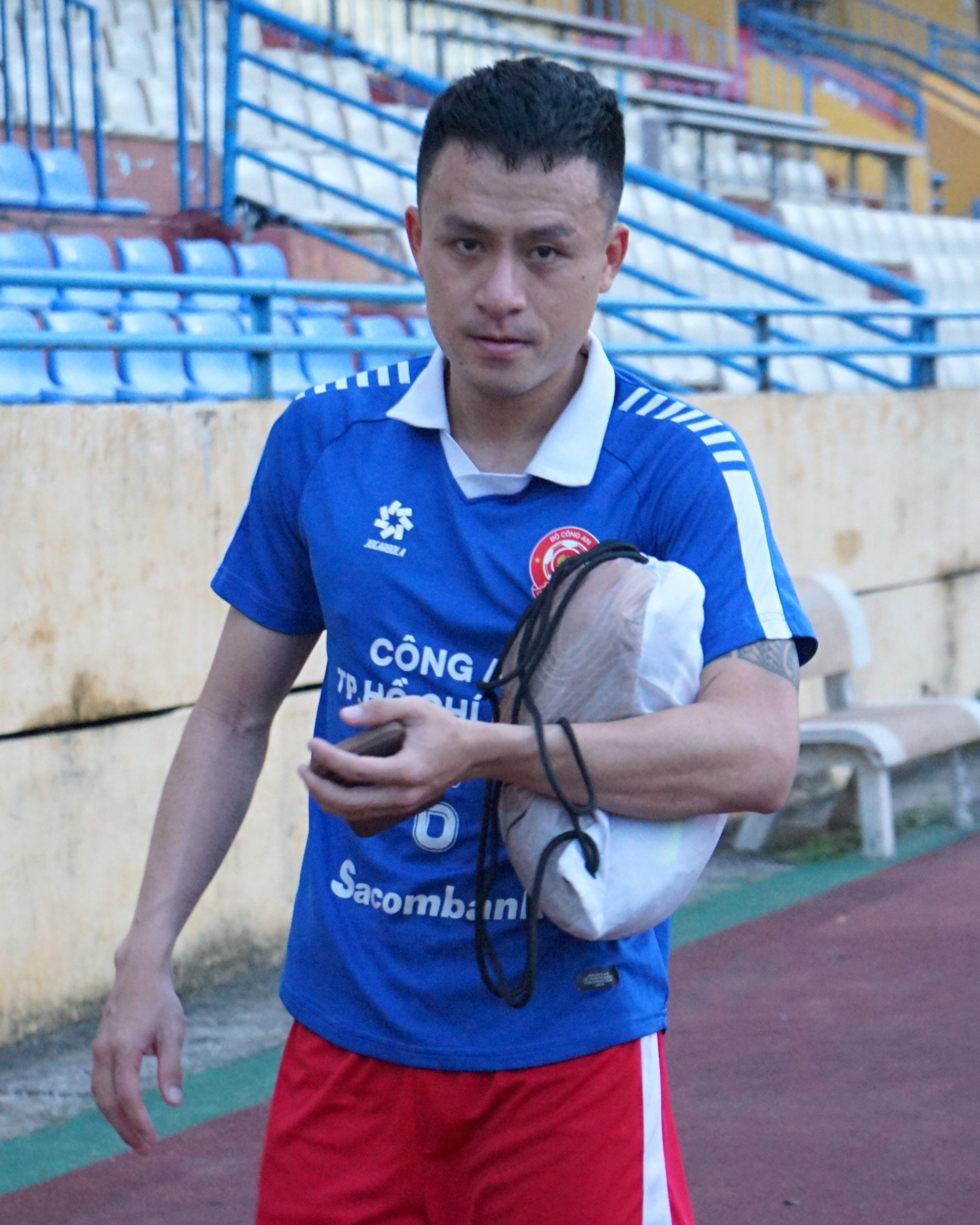
- Huy Toàn in 2026

Personal information
- Full name: Võ Huy Toàn
- Date of birth: 15 March 1993 (age 33)
- Place of birth: Đà Lạt, Lâm Đồng, Vietnam
- Height: 1.73 m (5 ft 8 in)
- Positions: Left winger; left-back

Team information
- Current team: SHB Đà Nẵng
- Number: 26

Youth career
- 2004–2013: SHB Đà Nẵng

Senior career*
| Years | Team | Apps | (Gls) |
| 2013–2019 | SHB Đà Nẵng | 70 | (14) |
| 2013 | → Hà Nội (Loan) | | |
| 2015–2016 | → Sài Gòn (Loan) | 13 | (1) |
| 2020–2026 | Công An Hồ Chí Minh City | 97 | (6) |
| 2026– | SHB Đà Nẵng | 0 | (0) |

International career^{‡}
| 2011–2012 | Vietnam U19 | 5 | (0) |
| 2015–2016 | Vietnam U23 | 17 | (9) |
| 2014–2016 | Vietnam | 9 | (1) |
- * Club domestic league appearances and goals as of 7 June 2026 ‡ National team caps and goals as of 8 October 2016

Võ Huy Toàn (born 15 March 1993) is a Vietnamese professional footballer who plays as a left winger for V.League 1 club SHB Đà Nẵng.

== Club career ==
Huy Toàn began his career at V.League 2 club Hà Nội in the 2013 season. He returned to SHB Đà Nẵng for the 2014 season, and quickly became an important starter for the team.

In July 2026, after his contract with Công An Hồ Chí Minh City terminated, Huy Toàn returned to SHB Đà Nẵng after 7 years.

== International career ==
Huy Toàn represented Vietnam at the 2014 AFF Championship where he scored the equalizing goal in the first leg match against Malaysia.

Huy Toàn also played in the 2015 SEA Games where he was the joint top scorer with five goals alongside Sithu Aung and Chananan Pombuppha.

Huy Toàn is known for keeping a small Vietnamese flag hidden in his shin guard which he takes out to display when he scores. This patriotic behavior has made him popular with the Vietnamese supporters.

=== U-23 goals ===
| # | Date | Venue | Opponent | Score | Result | Competition |
|---|---|---|---|---|---|---|
| 1. | 15 September 2014 | Ansan Wa~ Stadium, South Korea | Iran | 1–0 | 4–1 | 2014 Asian Games |
| 2. | 9 March 2015 | Mỹ Đình, Vietnam | Indonesia | 1–0 | 1–0 | Friendly |
| 3. | 27 March 2015 | Shah Alam, Malaysia | Malaysia | 1–1 | 2–1 | 2016 AFC U-23 Qualifiers |
| 4. | 2 June 2015 | Bishan, Singapore | Malaysia | 3–0 | 5–1 | 2015 Southeast Asian Games |
| 5. | 7 June 2015 | Bishan, Singapore | Timor-Leste | 4–0 | 4–0 | 2015 Southeast Asian Games |
| 6. | 13 June 2015 | National Stadium, Singapore | Myanmar | 1–1 | 1–2 | 2015 Southeast Asian Games |
| 7. | 15 June 2015 | National Stadium, Singapore | Indonesia | 2–0 | 5–0 | 2015 Southeast Asian Games |
| 8. | 15 June 2015 | National Stadium, Singapore | Indonesia | 3–0 | 5–0 | 2015 Southeast Asian Games |

=== International goals ===
| # | Date | Venue | Opponent | Score | Result | Competition |
|---|---|---|---|---|---|---|
| 1. | 7 December 2014 | Shah Alam, Malaysia | Malaysia | 1–1 | 2–1 | 2014 AFF Championship |

== Honours ==
Cong An Hồ Chí Minh City

- Vietnamese National Cup: 2025–26

Vietnam U23

- SEA Games bronze medal: 2015
