= Careca (footballer, born 1983) =

Brazilian footballer

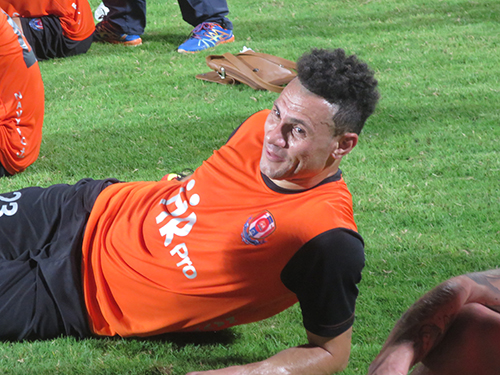

Personal information
- Full name: Rodrigo Vergilio
- Date of birth: 13 April 1983 (age 43)
- Place of birth: Pederneiras, Brazil
- Height: 1.81 m (5 ft 11 in)
- Position: Striker

Youth career
- 1999–2001: Sociedade Matonense
- 2001: Corinthians

Senior career*
Years	Team	Apps	(Gls)
2002	Matonense	34	(16)
2003	Noroeste	36	(14)
2004	Ventforet Kofu	5	(0)
2004	Atlética Flamengo	31	(0)
2005	São Bernardo	30	(0)
2006	Grêmio Recreativo Barueri	28	(0)
2007	Comercial	35	(0)
2007	Thespa Kusatsu	19	(4)
2008	Cerezo Osaka	15	(3)
2008	Shonan Bellmare	1	(1)
2008–2009	Al-Naser	10	(6)
2009–2011	Al-Kuwait	10	(5)
2011	→ Al-Nasr SC (loan)	6	(0)
2011	Qadsia SC	13	(7)
2011	Al-Nasr SC	10	(3)
2012–2013	Al-Shaab	10	(3)
2013–2014	Dubai CSC	6	(2)
2014	Náutico	5	(2)
2014	Dibba Al-Fujairah	2	(3)
2015	Navy	15	(11)
2016	Chonburi	29	(12)
2017–2018	Navy	39	(18)
2018	Suphanburi	3	(1)
2019	São Bernardo	3	(0)
- * Club domestic league appearances and goals

Rodrigo Vergilio, better known as Careca or Rodrigo (born 13 April 1983), is a Brazilian former football striker.

Careca previously played for Cerezo Osaka in the J2 League. Careca signed with Al Qadsia in Kuwaiti Premier League, but the deal fell through soon after. In December 2015 it was announced that Careca would be joining Chonburi for the 2016 season.

== Club statistics ==
Club performance			League		Cup		Total	
Season	Club	League	Apps	Goals	Apps	Goals	Apps	Goals
Japan			League		Emperor's Cup		Total	
2004	Ventforet Kofu	J2 League	5	0	0	0	5	0
2007	Thespa Kusatsu	J2 League	19	4	2	0	21	4
2008	Cerezo Osaka	J2 League	15	3	0	0	15	3
2008	Shonan Bellmare	J2 League	1	1	0	0	1	1
Country	Japan		40	8	2	0	42	8
Total			40	8	2	0	42	8
