= 2014 AFF Championship =

2014 Kejohanan Bola Sepak ASEAN 2014 東盟足球錦標賽 2014 ஏசியான் கால்ப கோப்பை Giải vô địch bóng đá Đông Nam Á 2014

Tournament details
- Host country: Singapore; Vietnam (for group stage)
- Dates: 22 November – 20 December
- Teams: 8 (from 1 sub-confederation)
- Venues: 8 (in 5 host cities)

Final positions
- Champions: Thailand (4th title)
- Runners-up: Malaysia

Tournament statistics
- Matches played: 18
- Goals scored: 65 (3.61 per match)
- Top scorer(s): (Malaysia) Mohd Safiq Rahim (6 goals)
- Best player: (Thailand) Chanathip Songkrasin
- Fair play award: Vietnam

The 2014 AFF Championship, sponsored by Suzuki and officially known as the 2014 AFF Suzuki Cup, was the 10th edition of the AFF Championship, an international association football competition consisting of national teams of member nations of the ASEAN Football Federation (AFF).

Co-hosting rights to the group stages were awarded to Singapore and Vietnam with matches held from 22 November to 20 December 2014. Meanwhile, Malaysia, the Philippines and Thailand also hosted knockout stage matches, as their teams advanced to the semi-finals with Vietnam.

Singapore were the defending champions, but were eliminated in the group stage. Thailand won the tournament 4–3 in a two-legged final against Malaysia, with manager Kiatisuk Senamuang being the first coach to win the competition also as a player.

== Hosts ==
Singapore and Vietnam were announced as co-hosts of the group stage by the AFF Council on 3 April 2013. Initially the Philippines and Indonesia were also considered as possible co-hosts.

== Venues ==
Singapore		Hanoi, Vietnam	
National Stadium	Jalan Besar Stadium	Mỹ Đình National Stadium	Hàng Đẫy Stadium
Capacity: 55,000	Capacity: 8,000	Capacity: 40,192	Capacity: 22,500
National Stadium	Jalan Besar Stadium	Mỹ Đình National Stadium	Hàng Đẫy Stadium
Location of stadiums of the 2014 AFF Championship. Blue: Finals; Green: Semi-finals and Group Stage; Yellow: Group Stage.
Bangkok, Thailand	Shah Alam, Malaysia	Kuala Lumpur, Malaysia	Manila, Philippines
Rajamangala Stadium	Shah Alam Stadium	Bukit Jalil National Stadium	Rizal Memorial Stadium
Capacity: 49,722	Capacity: 80,372	Capacity: 110,000	Capacity: 12,873
Rajamangala Stadium	Shah Alam Stadium	Bukit Jalil National Stadium	Rizal Memorial Stadium

== Qualification ==
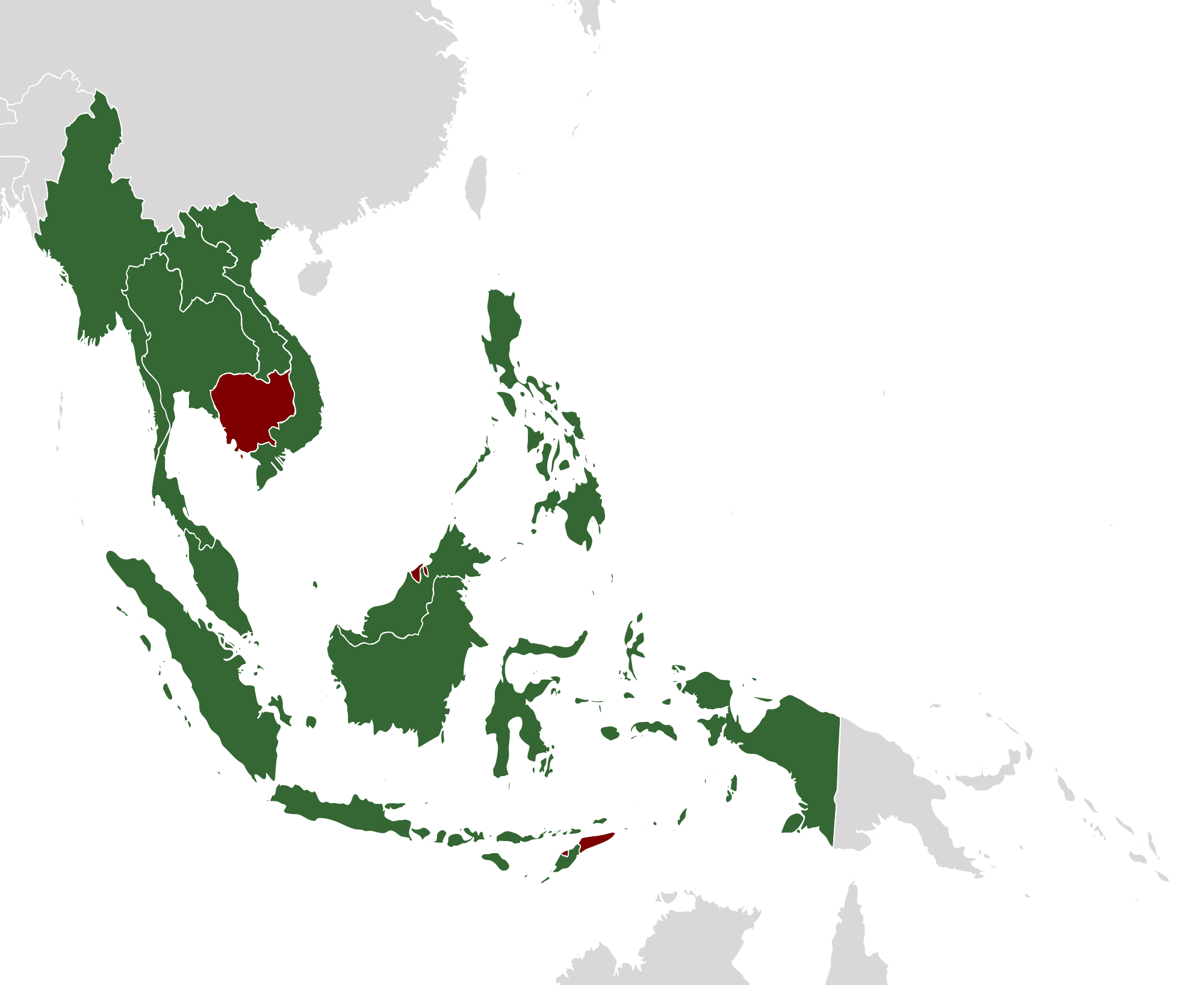
Qualified Teams. Teams Did not qualify.

Qualification was to have been scrapped for this edition of the tournament, but at the AFF Council Meeting in Naypyidaw, Myanmar in December 2013, it was decided that the qualifying round would be retained, and Laos were awarded the hosting rights. It was to involve the five lower ranked teams in the region, with games taking place between 12 and 20 October 2014.

In August 2013, Football Federation Australia became a full member of the AFF, thus making them eligible to compete in the ASEAN Football Championship starting with this edition of the tournament. However, Australia had no plans to compete against lower-ranked teams in the AFF Championship and that they would continue to play in future editions of the EAFF East Asian Cup.

=== Qualified teams ===
The following eight teams qualified for the tournament.

Country	Previous best performance
Singapore	Winners (1998, 2004, 2007, 2012)
Thailand	Winners (1996, 2000, 2002)
Vietnam	Winners (2008)
Malaysia	Winners (2010)
Indonesia	Runner-up (2000, 2002, 2004, 2010)
Philippines	Semi-finals (2010, 2012)
Myanmar	Fourth place (2004)
Laos	Group stage (1996 to 2012)

== Draw ==
The draw for the tournament was held on 5 August 2014 in Hanoi, Vietnam.

Pot 1	Pot 2	Pot 3	Pot 4
Vietnam (co-host); Singapore (co-host)	Malaysia; Philippines	Thailand; Indonesia	Myanmar (Qualification winners); Laos (Qualification runners-up)

== Group stage ==
=== Tie-breaking criteria ===
Ranking in each group was determined as follows:

1. Greater number of points obtained in all the group matches;
2. Goal difference in all the group matches;
3. Greater number of goals scored in all the group matches.

If two or more teams were equal on the basis on the above three criteria, the placement was determined as follows:

1. Result of the direct match between the teams in question;
2. Penalty shoot-out if only two teams were tied and they met in the last round of the group;
3. Drawing of lots by the Organising Committee.

=== Group A ===
- All matches were played in Vietnam.
- Times listed are local (UTC+7)

Pos	Team	Pld	W	D	L	GF	GA	GD	Pts	Qualification
1	Vietnam (H)	3	2	1	0	8	3	+5	7	Advance to knockout stage
2	Philippines	3	2	0	1	9	4	+5	6	Advance to knockout stage
3	Indonesia	3	1	1	1	7	7	0	4	
4	Laos	3	0	0	3	2	12	−10	0	

(H) Hosts
22 November 2014
16:00

Philippines	4–1	Laos
Rota 40'; P. Younghusband 45+1'; Reichelt 77', 88'	Report	Khampheng 21'

Mỹ Đình National Stadium, Hanoi
Referee: Wang Di (China)
22 November 2014
19:00

Vietnam	2–2	Indonesia
Quế Ngọc Hải 11'; Lê Công Vinh 68'	Report	Zulham 33'; Samsul 84'

Mỹ Đình National Stadium, Hanoi
Referee: Minoru Tōjō (Japan)

25 November 2014
16:00

Philippines	4–0	Indonesia
P. Younghusband 16' (pen.); Ott 52'; Steuble 68'; Gier 79'	Report

Mỹ Đình National Stadium, Hanoi
Referee: Fahad Al-Marri (Qatar)
25 November 2014
19:00

Laos	0–3	Vietnam
	Report	Vũ Minh Tuấn 27'; Lê Công Vinh 84'; Nguyễn Huy Hùng 88'

Mỹ Đình National Stadium, Hanoi
Referee: Ali Sabah (Iraq)

28 November 2014
19:00

Indonesia	5–1	Laos
Evan 8'; Ramdhani 20', 50'; Zulham 82'; Ketsada 89' (o.g.)	Report	Khampheng 28' (pen.)

Hàng Đẫy Stadium, Hanoi
Referee: Ali Sabah (Iraq)
28 November 2014
19:00

Vietnam	3–1	Philippines
Ngô Hoàng Thịnh 9'; Vũ Minh Tuấn 50'; Phạm Thành Lương 58'	Report	Mulders 60'

Mỹ Đình National Stadium, Hanoi
Referee: Minoru Tōjō (Japan)

=== Group B ===
- All matches were played in Singapore.
- Times listed are local (UTC+8)

Due to problems with the pitch at the Singapore National Stadium, the ASEAN Football Federation have decided on using a second venue, the Jalan Besar Stadium, for Group B matches.

Pos	Team	Pld	W	D	L	GF	GA	GD	Pts	Qualification
1	Thailand	3	3	0	0	7	3	+4	9	Advance to knockout stage
2	Malaysia	3	1	1	1	5	4	+1	4	Advance to knockout stage
3	Singapore (H)	3	1	0	2	6	7	−1	3	
4	Myanmar	3	0	1	2	2	6	−4	1	

(H) Hosts
23 November 2014
18:00

Malaysia	0–0	Myanmar
	Report

Jalan Besar Stadium, Kallang
Referee: Çarymyrat Kurbanow (Turkmenistan)
23 November 2014
20:10

Singapore	1–2	Thailand
Khairul 20'	Report	Mongkol 9'; Chappuis 89' (pen.)

National Stadium, Kallang
Referee: Alireza Faghani (Iran)

26 November 2014
19:30

Malaysia	2–3	Thailand
Amri 28'; Safiq 61'	Report	Adisak 43', 90'; Chappuis 72'

Jalan Besar Stadium, Kallang
Referee: Ahmed Al-Kaf (Oman)
26 November 2014
20:00

Myanmar	2–4	Singapore
Kyaw Zayar Win 55'; Kyaw Ko Ko 62' (pen.)	Report	Shaiful 15'; Hariss 35', 42'; Khin Maung Lwin 75' (o.g.)

National Stadium, Kallang
Referee: Ilgiz Tantashev (Uzbekistan)

29 November 2014
20:00

Thailand	2–0	Myanmar
Tanaboon 12'; Prakit 84'	Report

Jalan Besar Stadium, Kallang
Referee: Çarymyrat Kurbanow (Turkmenistan)
29 November 2014
20:00

Singapore	1–3	Malaysia
Khairul 83'	Report	Safee 61'; Safiq 90+3' (pen.); Indra Putra 90+5'

National Stadium, Kallang
Referee: Ahmed Al-Kaf (Oman)

Notes

1. The match was delayed for one hour due to heavy rain.
2. The match was delayed due to rain.

== Knockout stage ==
=== Bracket ===
Semi-finals
A2	Philippines	0	0	0
B1	Thailand	0	3	3
B2	Malaysia	1	4	5
A1	Vietnam	2	2	4

Final
B1	Thailand	2	2	4
B2	Malaysia	0	3	3

=== Semi-finals ===
First legs

6 December 2014
20:00 UTC+8

Philippines	0–0	Thailand
	Report

Rizal Memorial Stadium, Manila
Referee: Abdullah Balideh (Qatar)
7 December 2014
20:00 UTC+8

Malaysia	1–2	Vietnam
Safiq 14' (pen.)	Report	Võ Huy Toàn 32'; Nguyễn Văn Quyết 60'

Shah Alam Stadium, Shah Alam
Referee: Ma Ning (China)

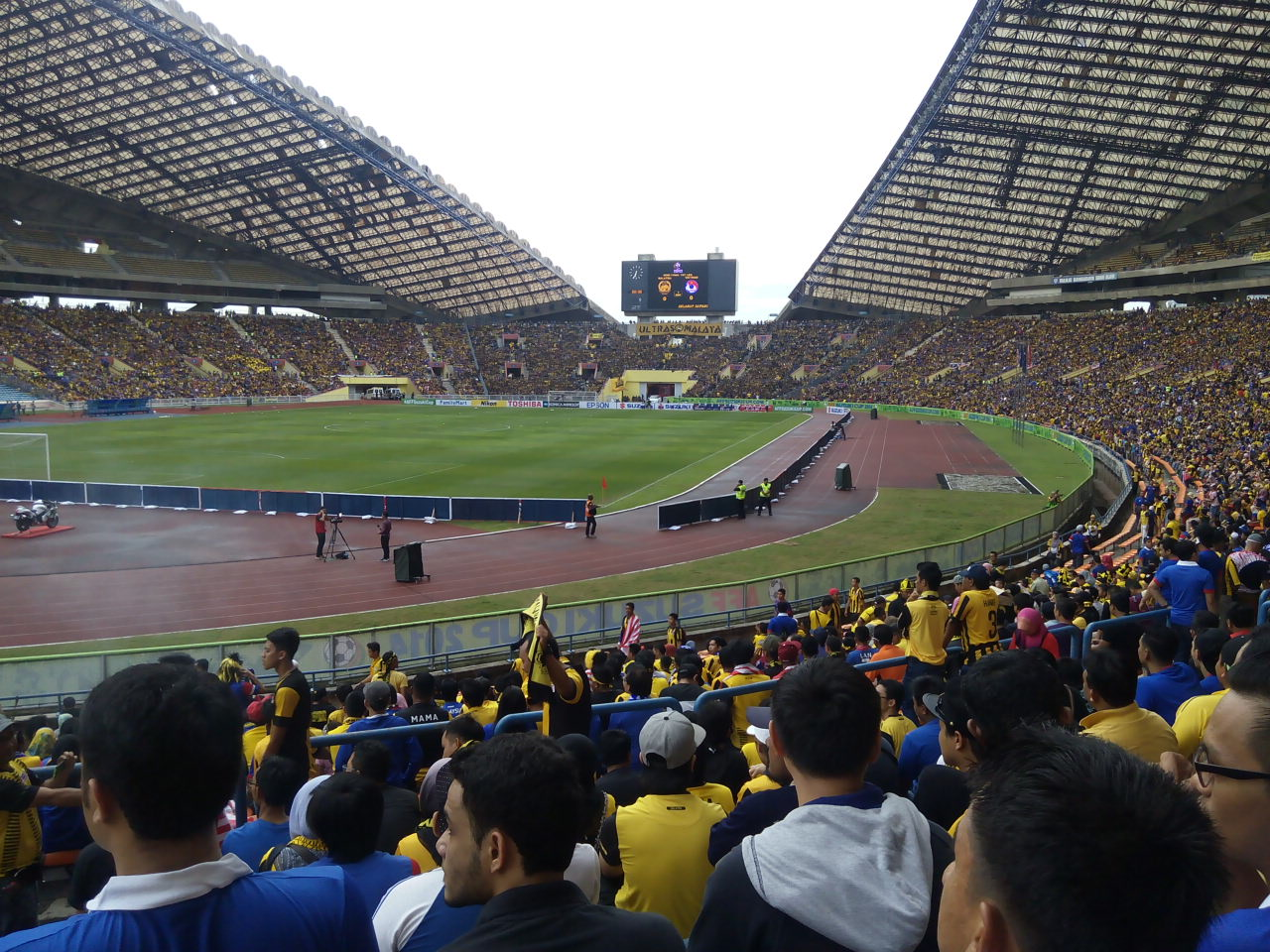
Match between Malaysia and Vietnam during the AFF Championship in 2014

Second legs

10 December 2014
19:00 UTC+7

Thailand	3–0	Philippines
Chanathip 6'; Kroekrit 57', 86'	Report

Rajamangala Stadium, Bangkok
Referee: Kim Sang-woo (South Korea)

Thailand won 3–0 on aggregate.

11 December 2014
19:00 UTC+7

Vietnam	2–4	Malaysia
Lê Công Vinh 22' (pen.), 79'	Report	Safiq 4' (pen.); Norshahrul 16'; Đinh Tiến Thành 29' (o.g.); Shukor 43'

Mỹ Đình National Stadium, Hanoi
Referee: Masaaki Toma (Japan)

Malaysia won 5–4 on aggregate.

=== Final ===
First leg

17 December 2014
19:00 UTC+7

Thailand	2–0	Malaysia
Chappuis 72' (pen.); Kroekrit 86'	Report

Rajamangala Stadium, Bangkok
Referee: Valentin Kovalenko (Uzbekistan)

Second leg

20 December 2014
20:00 UTC+8

Malaysia	3–2	Thailand
Safiq 6' (pen.), 57'; Indra Putra 45+2'	Report	Chappuis 82'; Chanathip 86'

Bukit Jalil National Stadium, Kuala Lumpur
Referee: Alireza Faghani (Iran)

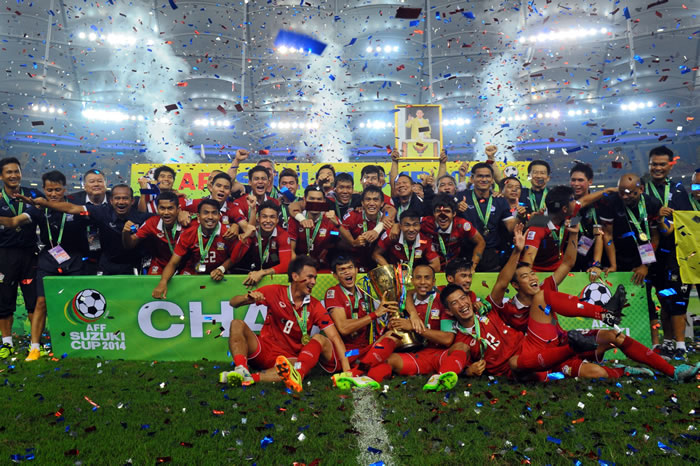
The Thai team celebrating after winning the 2014 AFF Suzuki Cup at Bukit Jalil Stadium, Malaysia.

Thailand won 4–3 on aggregate.

== Statistics ==
=== Winners ===
2014 AFF Championship champion

Thailand
Fourth title

=== Awards ===
Most Valuable Player	Top Scorer Award	Fair Play Award
(Thailand) Chanathip Songkrasin	(Malaysia) Mohd Safiq Rahim	Vietnam

=== Discipline ===
In the final tournament, a player was suspended for the subsequent match in the competition for either getting a red card, or accumulating two yellow cards in two different matches.

Player	Offences	Suspensions
(Indonesia) Rizky Pora	(red card) in Group A v Philippines	Group A v Laos
(Indonesia) Supardi Nasir	(red card) in Group A v Laos	
(Vietnam) Vũ Minh Tuấn	(yellow card) in Group A v Indonesia; (yellow card) in Group A v Philippines	Semi-finals (1st Leg) v Malaysia
(Malaysia) Mohd Amri Yahyah	(yellow card) in Group B v Myanmar; (yellow card) in Group B v Singapore	Semi-finals (1st Leg) v Vietnam
(Malaysia) Shukor Adan	(yellow card) in Group B v Thailand; (yellow card) in Group B v Singapore	Semi-finals (1st Leg) v Vietnam
(Malaysia) Gary Steven Robbat	(yellow card) (yellow-red card) in Group B v Myanmar	Group B v Thailand
(Singapore) Baihakki Khaizan	(yellow card) in Group B v Thailand; (yellow card) in Group B v Myanmar	Group B v Malaysia
(Thailand) Adisak Kraisorn	(red card) in Semi-finals (1st leg) v Philippines	Semi-finals (2nd leg) v Philippines

*Players who received a card during the final are not included here.

=== Goalscorers ===
There were 65 goals scored in 18 matches, for an average of 3.61 goals per match.

6 goals

- (Malaysia) Mohd Safiq Rahim

4 goals

- (Thailand) Charyl Chappuis
- (Vietnam) Lê Công Vinh

3 goals

- (Thailand) Kroekrit Thaweekarn

2 goals

- (Indonesia) Ramdhani Lestaluhu
- (Indonesia) Zulham Zamrun
- (Laos) Khampheng Sayavutthi
- (Malaysia) Indra Putra Mahayuddin
- (Philippines) Patrick Reichelt
- (Philippines) Phil Younghusband
- (Singapore) Hariss Harun
- (Singapore) Khairul Amri
- (Thailand) Adisak Kraisorn
- (Thailand) Chanathip Songkrasin
- (Vietnam) Vũ Minh Tuấn

1 goal

- (Indonesia) Evan Dimas
- (Indonesia) Samsul Arif
- (Malaysia) Mohd Amri Yahyah
- (Malaysia) Norshahrul Idlan Talaha
- (Malaysia) Safee Sali
- (Malaysia) Shukor Adan
- (Myanmar) Kyaw Ko Ko
- (Myanmar) Kyaw Zayar Win
- (Philippines) Manuel Ott
- (Philippines) Martin Steuble
- (Philippines) Paul Mulders
- (Philippines) Rob Gier
- (Philippines) Simone Rota
- (Singapore) Shaiful Esah
- (Thailand) Mongkol Tossakrai
- (Thailand) Prakit Deeporm
- (Thailand) Tanaboon Kesarat
- (Vietnam) Ngô Hoàng Thịnh
- (Vietnam) Nguyễn Huy Hùng
- (Vietnam) Nguyễn Văn Quyết
- (Vietnam) Phạm Thành Lương
- (Vietnam) Quế Ngọc Hải
- (Vietnam) Võ Huy Toàn

1 own goal

- (Laos) Ketsada Souksavanh (playing against Indonesia)
- (Myanmar) Khin Maung Lwin (playing against Singapore)
- (Vietnam) Đinh Tiến Thành (playing against Malaysia)

== Team statistics ==
This table shows the ranking of all participating teams.

Pos	Team	Pld	W	D	L	GF	GA	GD	P
Finals
1	Thailand	7	5	1	1	14	6	+8	16
2	Malaysia	7	3	1	3	13	12	+1	10
Semifinals
3	Vietnam	5	3	1	1	12	8	+4	10
4	Philippines	5	2	1	2	9	7	+2	7
Eliminated in the group stage
5	Indonesia	3	1	1	1	7	7	0	4
6	Singapore	3	1	0	2	6	7	–1	3
7	Myanmar	3	0	1	2	2	6	–4	1
8	Laos	3	0	0	3	2	12	–10	0

== Media coverage ==
2014 AFF Championship television broadcasters in Southeast Asia
Country	Broadcast network	Television station
Australia	None	
Brunei	RTB	RTB1
Cambodia	TVK	TVK
Indonesia	MNC Media	RCTI, MNCTV, Global TV
Laos	LNTV	LNTV1
Malaysia	Media Prima, Astro	TV3, TV9, Astro Arena
Myanmar	MRTV	MRTV
Philippines	ABS-CBN Corporation	ABS-CBN Sports+Action
Singapore	MediaCorp	Okto: Sports on Okto
Thailand	BBTV, TrueVisions	CH7, 7HD True Sport HD,
Timor-Leste	RTTL	TTL
Vietnam	VTV	VTV2 and VTV6
2014 AFF Championship international television broadcasters
Asia-wide	Fox International Channels	Fox Sports Asia

== Incidents and controversies ==
During a group match between Singapore and Malaysia at the Singapore National Stadium, irate Singaporean fans began throwing bottles of water and toilet rolls on the pitch and players gate tunnel at the end of the match due to what was seen as awful decision-making by Oman referee Ahmed Al-Kaf, who awarded the Malaysian side a penalty kick resulting in an advantage for them.

Other incidents occurred soon during the first semi-final between Malaysia and Vietnam in Shah Alam Stadium, where some of the Malaysian fans were seen pointing green laser lights on the field, as recorded on the match video in television camera. The laser incident is a continuation from Malaysian hooligans, as it also happened during the previous edition of AFF Championship semi-final against Vietnam and in the final against Indonesia in 2010.

At the end of Malaysia 1–2 loss to Vietnam, some Malaysian hooligan fans began attacking Vietnamese fans, resulting in injuries. The hooligans rushed to assault Vietnamese fans, who tried to flee and had no intention of fighting back. Bottles, smoke bombs and other dangerous objects continued to get thrown even after the Royal Malaysia Police arrived at the scene to quell the scuffles. This was heavily criticised by the Vietnamese side for the rioting shown by some of the Malaysian supporters. As a result, the website of the Football Association of Malaysia (FAM) had been hacked in a denial of service attack, perhaps from Vietnam. Other Malaysian supporters together with the Malaysia Minister of Youth and Sports, Khairy Jamaluddin condemn the hooligan fans attitude and has offer their apologies to all Vietnamese fans, adding that five of the perpetrators had been arrested. Another nine people's was arrested for the same offence between 11 and 12 December.

The Philippines team received a death threat before their 2nd semi-final match against Thailand. Sources say the threat has something to do with the scuffle during 1st leg between Filipino defender Amani Aguinaldo and Thai striker Adisak Kraisorn, which led to Adisak being red-carded and suspended for the 2nd leg.

In the semi-final between Malaysia and Vietnam, the Vietnam had won the first-leg in Malaysia with a 2–1 score. However, in the second-leg played in Hanoi, Vietnam lost 2–4, thus losing 4–5 on aggregate with Malaysia advancing to the finals. After that defeat, the Vietnam Football Federation (VFF) launched a probe into the defeat, citing potential match-fixing due to the seemingly apathetic performance of the players compared to the first-leg. However, the AFF said that the match was not fixed and went on to say that through Swiss-based sports integrity specialist Sportradar, no unusual betting had taken place during the match.
