= Đinh Tiến Thành =

Vietnamese footballer (born 1991)

Personal information
- Full name: Đinh Tiến Thành
- Date of birth: 24 January 1991 (age 35)
- Place of birth: Hải Phòng, Vietnam
- Height: 1.85 m (6 ft 1 in)
- Position: Centre back

Team information
- Current team: Thanh Hóa
- Number: 16

Youth career
- 2010–2011: Hải Phòng

Senior career*
Years	Team	Apps	(Gls)
2012–2018	Hải Phòng	45	(1)
2015–2016	→ XSKT Cần Thơ (loan)	29	(0)
2017–2018	→ FLC Thanh Hóa (loan)	23	(2)
2018–2019	Thanh Hóa	30	(1)
2019–2021	Hà Nội	5	(0)
2021	Bình Định	7	(0)
2022–	Thanh Hóa	40	(1)

International career^{‡}
2013–2014	Vietnam U23	10	(0)
2014–2017	Vietnam	13	(1)
- * Club domestic league appearances and goals as of 11 September 2019 ‡ National team caps and goals as of 29 March 2016

Đinh Tiến Thành (born 24 January 1991), is a Vietnamese professional footballer for Thanh Hóa as a defender and a member of the Vietnam national team.

He started his career in Vissai Ninh Bình moving in 2012 to Hải Phòng.

In 2014, he was selected for Vietnam. He represented Vietnam U23 in the 2013 Southeast Asian Games.

== Honours ==
=== Club ===
Đông Á Thanh Hóa

- Vietnamese National Cup:

(bronze) Third place : 2022
(gold) Champion : 2023, 2023–24

=== International ===
Vietnam

- AFF Championship

Semi-finalists : 2014, 2016

- AYA Bank Cup

(gold) Winners :: 2016

=== International goals ===
Scores and results list Vietnam's goal tally first.

Goal	Date	Venue	Opponent	Score	Result	Competition
1.	8 September 2015	Taipei Municipal Stadium, Taipei, Taiwan	Chinese Taipei	1–0	2–1	2018 FIFA World Cup qualification
