= Prakit Deeprom =

Thai footballer

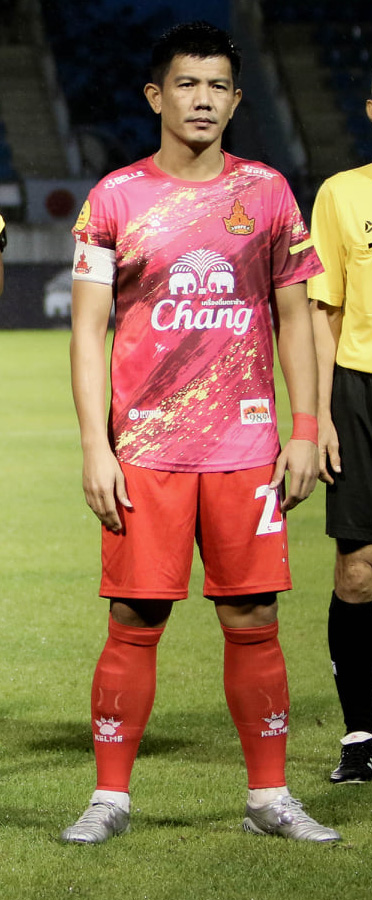
- Prakit Deeprom playing for Udon Thani.

Personal information
- Full name: Prakit Deeprom
- Date of birth: 7 January 1988 (age 38)
- Place of birth: Saraburi, Thailand
- Height: 1.67 m (5 ft 5 1/2 in)
- Positions: Midfielder; left winger

Team information
- Current team: Saraburi United
- Number: 21

Youth career
- 2003–2005: Assumption College Thonburi

Senior career*
Years	Team	Apps	(Gls)
2007	Muangthong United	14	(3)
2008–2010	Rajpracha	28	(5)
2011–2014	TOT	97	(16)
2015–2016	Buriram United	13	(1)
2016	→ Chonburi (loan)	15	(6)
2016–2017	Chonburi	16	(1)
2017–2018	Muangthong United	14	(0)
2018	→ Udon Thani (loan)	9	(0)
2019–2021	Udon Thani	79	(12)
2022	Phrae United	13	(0)
2022–2024	Nakhon Si United	46	(5)
2024–2025	Chanthaburi	17	(0)
2025–	Saraburi United	0	(0)

International career^{‡}
2002–2004	Thailand U17	11	(3)
2005–2006	Thailand U19	7	(5)
2014–2016	Thailand	18	(3)
Medal record
Thailand
Asean Football Championship
Winner	AFF Suzuki Cup 2014	2014
Winner	AFF Suzuki Cup 2016	2016
- * Club domestic league appearances and goals as of 30 April 2023 ‡ National team caps and goals as of 6 September 2016

Prakit Deeprom (Thai: ประกิต ดีพร้อม, born January 7, 1988), simply known as Kit (Thai: กิต), is a Thai professional footballer who plays as a midfielder for Thai League 3 club Saraburi United and formerly the Thailand national team.

== International career ==
In November 9, 2014 Prakit scored in a friendly match against Philippines. Prakit was also part of Thailand's winning squad in the 2014 AFF Suzuki Cup. During the last group stage game against Myanmar Prakit scored the second goal of a 2-0 win with a well hit free kick. He also provided a lovely assist for Kroekrit Thaweekarn in another 3-0 win over the Philippines in the semi-finals.

=== International ===
As of 17 December 2016

National team	Year	Apps	Goals
Thailand	2014	8	2
Thailand	2015	4	1
Thailand	2016	6	0
Thailand	Total	18	3

== International goals ==
Scores and results list Thailand's goal tally first.

No.	Date	Venue	Opponent	Score	Result	Competition	Ref.
1.	November 9, 2014	80th Birthday Stadium, Thailand	Philippines	2–0	3-0	Friendly	
2.	November 29, 2014	Jalan Besar Stadium, Singapore	Myanmar	2–0	2–0	2014 AFF Championship	
3.	March 30, 2015	Rajamangala Stadium, Thailand	Cameroon	1–0	2–3	Friendly	

== Honours ==
=== Club ===
Buriram United

- Thai League 1 (1): 2015
- Thai FA Cup (1): 2015
- Thai League Cup (1): 2015
- Kor Royal Cup (1): 2015
- Mekong Club Championship (1): 2015

Muangthong United

- Thai League Cup (1): 2017
- Mekong Club Championship (1): 2017

=== International ===
Thailand

- ASEAN Football Championship (2): 2014, 2016
- King's Cup (1): 2016
