= Tanachai Noorach =

Thai footballer

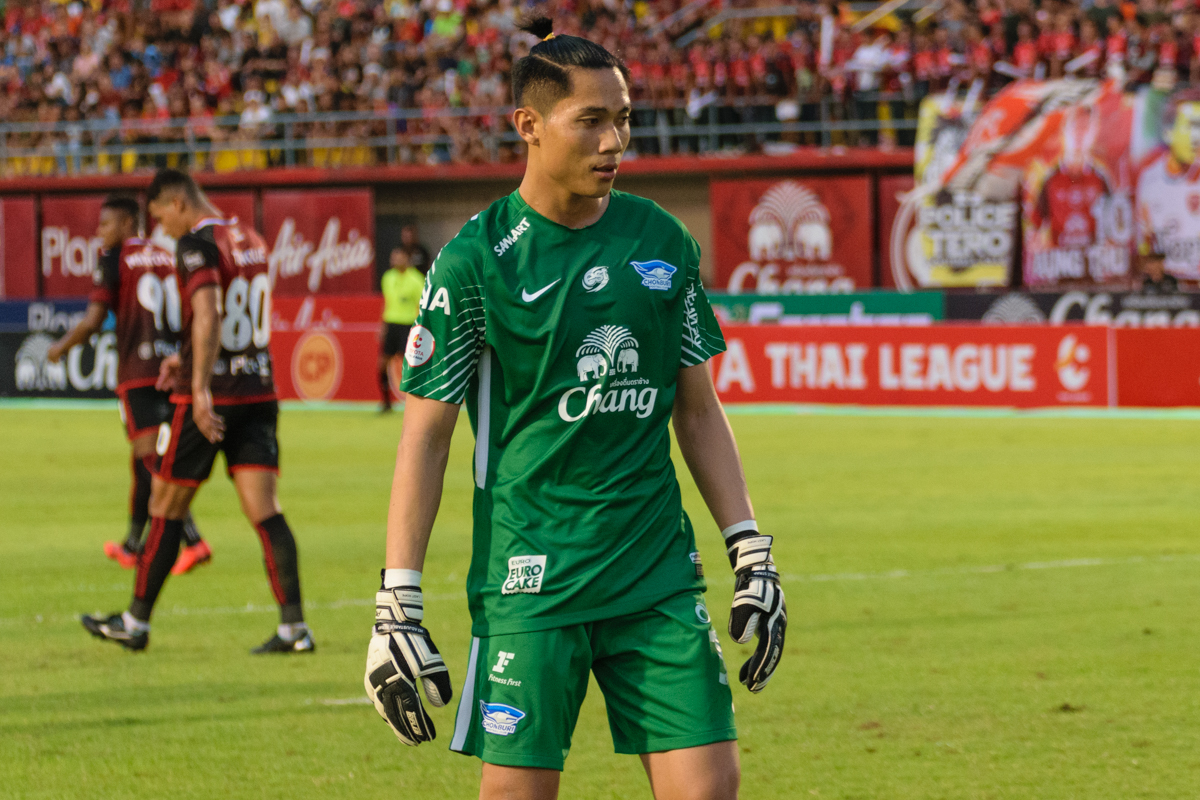

Personal information
- Full name: Tanachai Noorach
- Date of birth: 18 March 1992 (age 34)
- Place of birth: Nongkhai, Thailand
- Height: 1.88 m (6 ft 2 in)
- Position: Goalkeeper

Team information
- Current team: Nakhon Ratchasima
- Number: 36

Senior career*
Years	Team	Apps	(Gls)
2013–2015	Khon Kaen	34	(0)
2016–2019	Chonburi	8	(0)
2017	→ Nongbua Pitchaya (loan)	12	(0)
2019	→ Rayong (loan)	17	(0)
2020–	Nakhon Ratchasima	87	(0)
- * Club domestic league appearances and goals as of 9 February 2025

Tanachai Noorach (Thai: ธณชัย หนูราช; born March 18, 1992) is a Thai professional footballer who plays as a goalkeeper for Thai League 1 club Nakhon Ratchasima.

== Honours ==
Nakhon Ratchasima

- Thai League 2: 2023–24
