= Sarut Nasri =

Thai footballer

Personal information
- Full name: Sarut Nasri
- Date of birth: 8 June 1995 (age 31)
- Place of birth: Khon Kaen, Thailand
- Height: 1.95 m (6 ft 5 in)
- Position: Goalkeeper

Team information
- Current team: Kanchanaburi Power
- Number: 35

Senior career*
Years	Team	Apps	(Gls)
2014	Bangkok		
2014–2016	Chainat Hornbill		
2016	Samutsongkhram		
2017	Udon Thani		
2018	Suphanburi		
2018	Navy	2	(0)
2019	Ubon United	1	(0)
2019–2022	Chonburi	1	(0)
2022	→ PT Prachuap (loan)	3	(0)
2022–2023	PT Prachuap	0	(0)
2023–2024	Police Tero	9	(0)
2024	Pattaya United	4	(0)
2025	Chanthaburi	5	(0)
2025–	Kanchanaburi Power	7	(0)

International career
2014	Thailand U19		
- Thailand U21
- * Club domestic league appearances and goals as of 26 May 2024

Sarut Nasri (Thai: ศรุฒ ณะศรี, born 8 June 1995) is a Thai professional footballer who plays as a goalkeeper for Thai League 1 club Kanchanaburi Power .

In January 2025, he moved to Chanthaburi, who also play in Thai League 2. He played five league games for the Chanthaburi club.
