= Panudech Maiwong =

Thai footballer (born 1996)

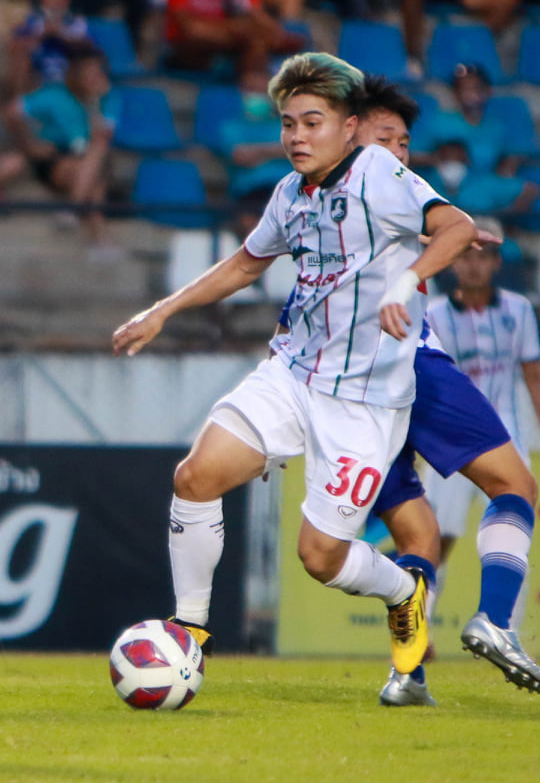

Personal information
- Date of birth: 13 January 1996 (age 30)
- Place of birth: Chiang Mai, Thailand
- Height: 1.62 m (5 ft 4 in)
- Positions: Attacking midfielder; winger

Team information
- Current team: Chiangmai
- Number: 10

Youth career
- 2011–2013: Vachiralai School
- 2014: Chonburi

Senior career*
| Years | Team | Apps | (Gls) |
| 2015– | Chonburi | 20 | (0) |
| 2015 | → Phan Thong (loan) | 15 | (3) |
| 2015 | → Hong Kong Rangers (loan) | 0 | (0) |
| 2019 | → Phuket City (loan) | 22 | (2) |
| 2020 | → Prachuap (loan) | 2 | (0) |
| 2020–2021 | → Lampang (loan) | 9 | (0) |
| 2021–2022 | → Phrae United (loan) | 29 | (1) |
| 2022 | → Rajpracha (loan) | 12 | (0) |
| 2023–2024 | Samut Prakan City | 17 | (0) |
| 2025 | Samut Sakhon City | 3 | (0) |
| 2025–2026 | Police Tero | 12 | (0) |
| 2026– | Chiangmai | 0 | (0) |

International career^{‡}
| 2017–2018 | Thailand U23 | 3 | (0) |
- * Club domestic league appearances and goals as of 18 May 2026 ‡ National team caps and goals as of 19 April 2017 (UTC)

Panudech Maiwong (Thai: ภาณุเดช ใหม่วงค์; born January 13, 1996) is a Thai footballer who plays as a midfielder or forward for Thai League 3 club Chiangmai .

== Club career ==
Starting his career at Chonburi-based side Chonburi F.C., Maiwong was loaned to Hong Kong Premier League side Hong Kong Rangers in 2015 on a 3-month deal, having impressed in a friendly game between the two clubs. However he was injured in training and failed to make a first team appearance, returning to Chonburi later the same year. He made his professional debut for Chonburi on 8 March 2017, coming on as a substitute for Kroekrit Thaweekarn in a 3–1 win over Super Power F.C.

== Career statistics ==
=== Club ===
As of 31 December 2025.

| Club | Season | League | | | Cup | | Continental | | Other | | Total | |
| Club | Season | Division | Apps | Goals | Apps | Goals | Apps | Goals | Apps | Goals | Apps | Goals |
|---|---|---|---|---|---|---|---|---|---|---|---|---|
| Phan Thong (loan) | 2015 | Regional League East | 15 | 3 | 0 | 0 | – | | 0 | 0 | 15 | 3 |
| Chonburi | 2017 | Thai League 1 | 18 | 0 | 0 | 0 | – | | 0 | 0 | 18 | 0 |
| Chonburi | 2018 | Thai League 1 | 2 | 0 | 0 | 0 | – | | 0 | 0 | 2 | 0 |
| Police Tero | 2025–26 | Thai League 2 | 8 | 0 | 1 | 0 | – | | 1 | 0 | 10 | 0 |
| Career total | | | 43 | 3 | 1 | 0 | 0 | 0 | 1 | 0 | 45 | 3 |
