= Niran Hansson =

Thai footballer (born 1996)

Personal information
- Full name: Rolf Niran Meemak Hansson
- Date of birth: 22 January 1996 (age 30)
- Place of birth: Bangkok, Thailand
- Height: 1.83 m (6 ft 0 in)
- Positions: Centre back; defensive midfielder

Youth career
- 2009–2013: Älvsjö AIK
- 2013–2015: IF Brommapojkarna

Senior career*
Years	Team	Apps	(Gls)
2015–2016	IF Brommapojkarna	0	(0)
2017	Port	1	(0)
2017–2018	Police Tero	44	(1)
2018–2021	Chonburi	29	(0)
2021–2022	Buriram United	1	(0)
2022	→ Nongbua Pitchaya (loan)	1	(0)
- * Club domestic league appearances and goals as of 1 December 2022

Rolf Niran Meemak Hansson (Thai: รอล์ฟ นิรันดร์ มีมาก ฮานส์สัน, born 22 January 1996) is a Thai professional footballer who plays as a centre back or a defensive midfielder.

== Career ==
Hansson started his career with IF Brommapojkarna and then later moved to port FC where he played just one match before eventually moving to Police Tero FC where he played 44 matches and scored 1 goal. After spending a season at Police Tero FC, he moved to Chonburi FC for 29 games.
