= Nattawut Saengsri =

Thai footballer (born 1997)

Personal information
- Date of birth: 15 August 1997 (age 29)
- Place of birth: Thailand
- Position: Midfielder

Team information
- Current team: MH Nakhon Si City
- Number: 8

Youth career
- Chonburi

Senior career*
Years	Team	Apps	(Gls)
2017–2021	Chonburi	2	(0)
2018	→ Surat Thani (loan)		
2019	→ Phuket City (loan)	14	(1)
2020	→ Kasetsart (loan)	3	(0)
2020	→ Rayong (loan)	10	(0)
2021	→ Trat (loan)	9	(0)
2022	MH Khon-Surat City	8	(0)
2022–2023	Kongkrailas United	15	(0)
2023–	MH Nakhon Si City	0	(0)

International career
2018	Thailand U23	1	(0)
- * Club domestic league appearances and goals as of 18 March 2023

Nattawut Saengsri (Thai: : นัฐวุธฒ์ แสงศรี, born August 15, 1997), is a Thai professional footballer who plays as a midfielder.
