= Sampan Kesi =

Thai footballer (born 1999)

Personal information
- Full name: Sampan Kesi
- Date of birth: 3 July 1999 (age 27)
- Place of birth: Sisaket, Thailand
- Height: 1.65 m (5 ft 5 in)
- Position: Left back

Youth career
- 2014–2018: Chonburi

Senior career*
Years	Team	Apps	(Gls)
2019–2023	Chonburi	17	(0)
2018	→ Nakhon Nayok (loan)	10	(0)
2019	→ Phuket City (loan)	16	(0)
2022–2023	→ Samut Prakan City (loan)	29	(0)
2023–2024	Khon Kaen United	11	(0)
2025–2026	Police Tero	47	(3)

International career
2017–2018	Thailand U19	2	(0)
2019–2021	Thailand U23	5	(0)
- * Club domestic league appearances and goals as of 14 June 2026

Sampan Kesi (Thai: สัมพันธ์ เกษี; born 3 July 1999) is a Thai professional footballer who plays as a left back.

== Honours ==
=== International ===
Thailand U-23

- 2019 AFF U-22 Youth Championship: Runner up
