= Teerapong Deehamhae =

Thai footballer (born 1991)

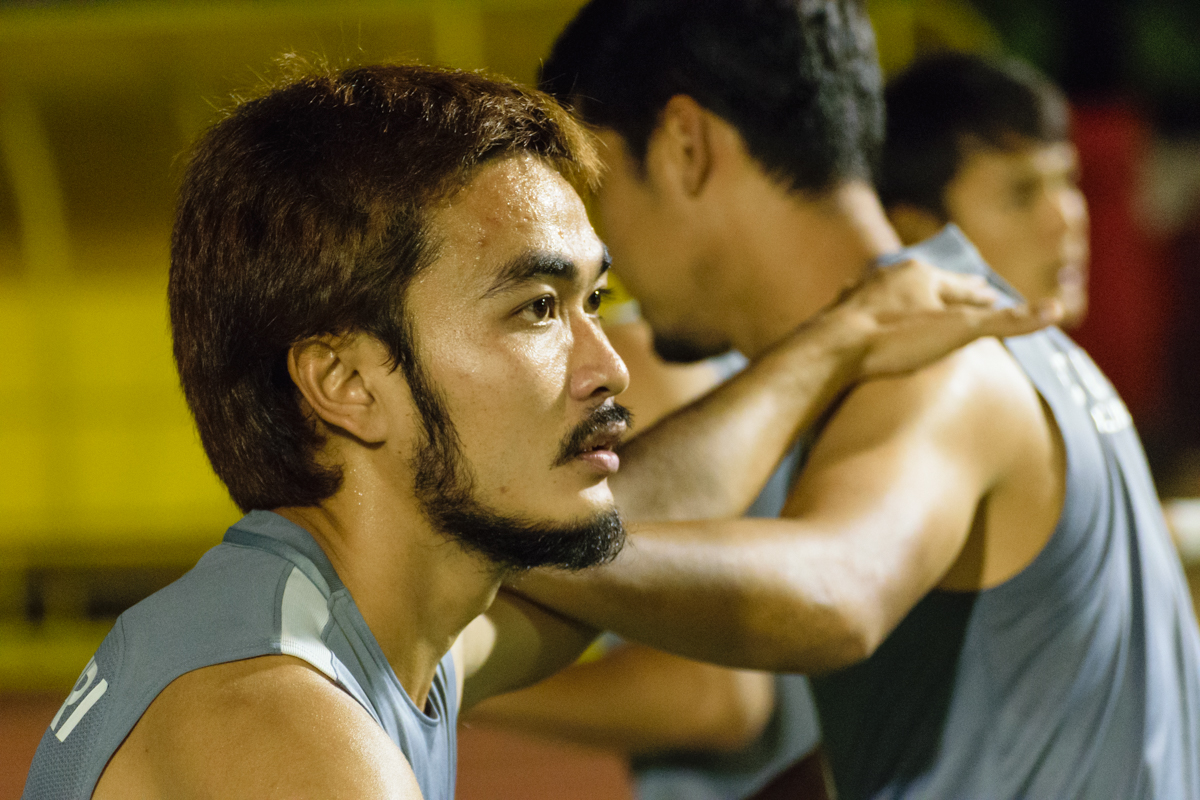

Personal information
- Full name: Teerapong Deehamhae
- Date of birth: 5 January 1991 (age 35)
- Place of birth: Chaiyaphum, Thailand
- Height: 1.68 m (5 ft 6 in)
- Position: Defensive midfielder

Team information
- Current team: Mahasarakham
- Number: 4

Youth career
- 2009–2010: Bangkok Christian College

Senior career*
Years	Team	Apps	(Gls)
2011–2014	Roi Et United	105	(11)
2014–2016	Police United	8	(0)
2015	→ Saraburi (loan)	12	(0)
2016	→ Chiangmai (loan)	13	(0)
2017	Chiangmai	19	(3)
2018–2022	Chonburi	33	(0)
2020–2021	→ PT Prachuap (loan)	11	(0)
2021–2022	→ Pattaya Dolphins United (loan)	26	(3)
2022–	Mahasarakham	23	(0)

International career
2011	Thailand U23	4	(0)
- * Club domestic league appearances and goals as of 6 May 2023

Teerapong Deehamhae (Thai: ธีระพงศ์ ดีหามแห) is a Thai professional footballer who plays as a defensive midfielder for Thai League 3 club Mahasarakham.

== Honours ==
=== Club ===
Roi Et United

- Regional League Division 2 Champions (1) : 2013
- Regional League North-East Division Champions (3) : 2011, 2012, 2013

Mahasarakham SBT

- Thai League 3 Northeastern Region Champions (1) : 2022–23
