= Leandro Assumpção =

Brazilian footballer

Personal information
- Full name: Leandro Assumpção da Silva
- Date of birth: 3 February 1986 (age 40)
- Place of birth: Brazil
- Height: 1.80 m (5 ft 11 in)
- Positions: Forward; winger

Team information
- Current team: Mahasarakham SBT
- Number: 10

Senior career*
Years	Team	Apps	(Gls)
2007	Madureira	15	(1)
2007	Vitória	27	(4)
2007	Flamengo	24	(2)
2009	Bangu	15	(6)
2010	Olaria	3	(1)
2010	Vila Nova	62	(2)
2011	Cabofriense	9	(1)
2011–2014	Chiangrai United	45	(28)
2013	→ Chonburi (loan)	12	(7)
2015–2016	Chonburi	61	(21)
2017	Sisaket	17	(11)
2017–2018	Muangthong United	16	(13)
2018	→ Air Force Central (loan)	8	(2)
2018–2020	Nakhon Ratchasima	55	(27)
2020–2021	Suphanburi	14	(7)
2021–2022	Muangkan United	25	(17)
2023–	Mahasarakham SBT	75	(34)
Total		483	(184)
- * Club domestic league appearances and goals as of 24 October 2021

Leandro Assumpção da Silva (born February 3, 1986) is a Brazilian footballer. He started playing football in Thailand with Chiangrai United in 2011. After playing for many clubs, he became the eighth footballer who scored more than 100 goals in Thai League 1 in July 2019.

== Honours ==
=== Club ===
Muangthong United

- Thai League Cup (1): 2017
- Mekong Club Championship (1): 2017
