= Noppanon Kachaplayuk =

Thai footballer (born 1991)

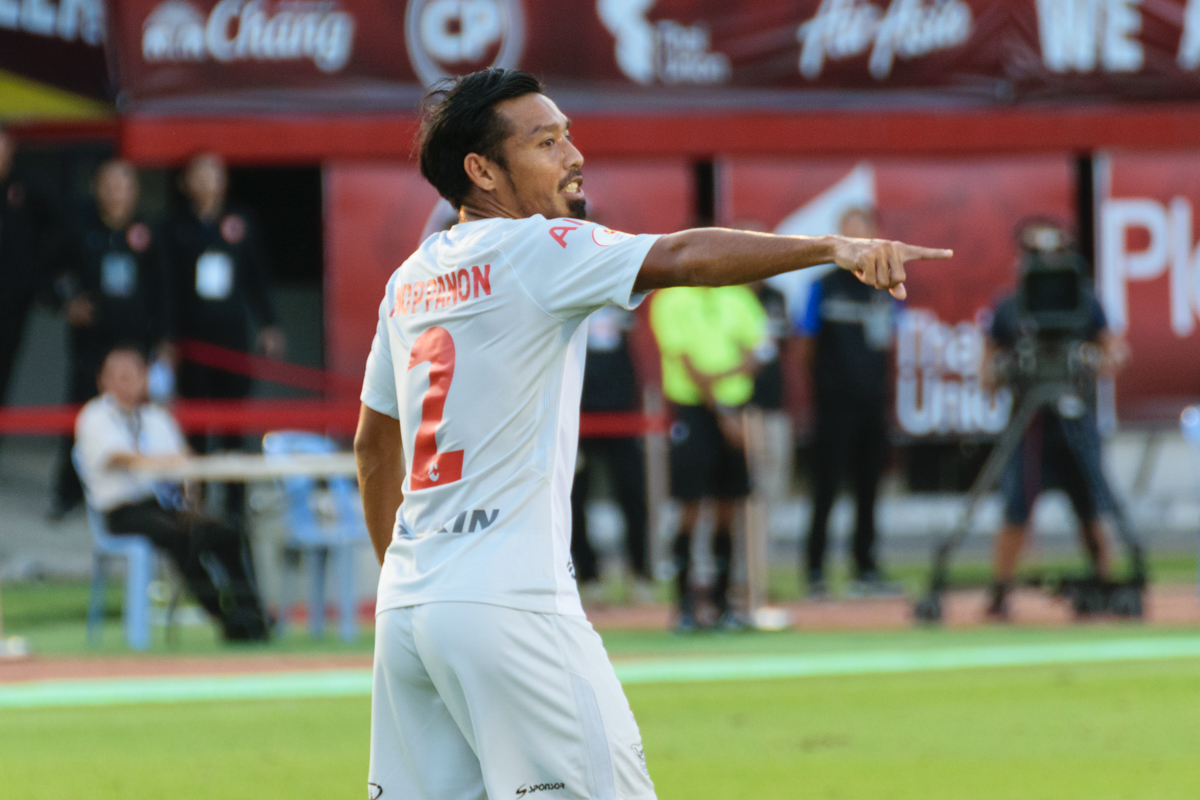

Personal information
- Full name: Noppanon Kachaplayuk
- Date of birth: 2 August 1991 (age 35)
- Place of birth: Songkhla, Thailand
- Height: 1.68 m (5 ft 6 in)
- Position: Right back

Team information
- Current team: Mahasarakham SBT
- Number: 15

Youth career
- 2007–2009: Chonburi

Senior career*
Years	Team	Apps	(Gls)
2010–2024	Chonburi	202	(0)
2010	→ Songkhla (loan)	9	(1)
2024–	Mahasarakham SBT	27	(0)

International career
2010	Thailand U19	4	(0)
2012	Thailand U23	2	(0)
- * Club domestic league appearances and goals as of 10 March 2025

Noppanon Kachaplayuk (Thai: นพนนท์ คชพลายุกต์; born 2 August 1991) is a Thai professional footballer who plays as a right back for Thai League 2 club, Mahasarakham SBT.

== Honours ==
=== International ===
Thailand U-19

- AFF U-19 Youth Championship: 2009
