= Chakhon Philakhlang =

Thai footballer

Personal information
- Full name: Chakhon Philakhlang
- Date of birth: 8 March 1998 (age 28)
- Place of birth: Samut Prakan, Thailand
- Height: 1.83 m (6 ft 0 in)
- Position: Goalkeeper

Team information
- Current team: Uttaradit

Youth career
- 2011–2014: Chonburi

Senior career*
Years	Team	Apps	(Gls)
2015–2024	Chonburi	2	(0)
2019	→ Khon Kaen (loan)	5	(0)
2020	→ Banbueng (loan)	1	(0)
2021–2024	→ Nakhon Si United (loan)	52	(0)
2024–2025	Rasisalai United	3	(0)
2025–2026	Navy	7	(0)
2026–	Uttaradit	0	(0)

International career
2014	Thailand U16	5	(0)
2015–2016	Thailand U19	8	(0)
2017–2018	Thailand U21	4	(0)
- * Club domestic league appearances and goals as of 30 April 2024

Chakhon Philakhlang (Thai: ชาคร พิลาคลัง, born 8 March 1998) is a Thai professional footballer who plays as a goalkeeper for Thai League 3 club Uttaradit.

== Honours ==
=== International ===
Thailand U-19

- AFF U-19 Youth Championship: 2015
