= Arthit Kansangwet =

Thai footballer (born 1998)

Personal information
- Full name: Arthit Kansangwet
- Date of birth: 22 July 1998 (age 28)
- Place of birth: Chonburi, Thailand
- Height: 1.69 m (5 ft 7 in)
- Position: Right-back

Youth career
- 2009–2015: Chonburi

Senior career*
| Years | Team | Apps | (Gls) |
| 2016–2020 | Chonburi | 4 | (0) |
| 2016 | → Phan Thong (loan) | | |
| 2020 | → Kasetsart (loan) | | |

International career
| 2015–2016 | Thailand U19 | | |
- * Club domestic league appearances and goals

Arthit Kansangwet (Thai: อาทิตย์ การสังเวชน์; born July 22, 1998) is a Thai professional footballer who plays as a right-back.

== Honours ==
=== International ===
Thailand U-19

- AFF U-19 Youth Championship: 2015
