= Phanuphong Phonsa =

Thai footballer (born 1994)

Personal information
- Full name: Phanuphong Phonsa
- Date of birth: 3 June 1994 (age 32)
- Place of birth: Loei, Thailand
- Height: 1.69 m (5 ft 6 1/2 in)
- Position: Winger

Team information
- Current team: Khon Kaen United
- Number: 35

Youth career
- 2008–2012: Assumption College Sriracha

Senior career*
Years	Team	Apps	(Gls)
2012–2024	Chonburi	95	(8)
2013	→ Phan Thong (loan)	12	(3)
2014–2015	→ TOT (loan)	36	(3)
2017	→ Buriram United (loan)	6	(0)
2024–	Khon Kaen United	12	(0)

International career
2010	Thailand U16	5	(1)
2021	Thailand	1	(0)
- * Club domestic league appearances and goals

Phanuphong Phonsa (Thai: ภานุพงศ์ พลซา, born 3 June 1994) is a Thai professional footballer who plays as a winger for Thai League 1 club Khon Kaen United and the Thailand national team.
