= Saharat Sontisawat =

Thai footballer

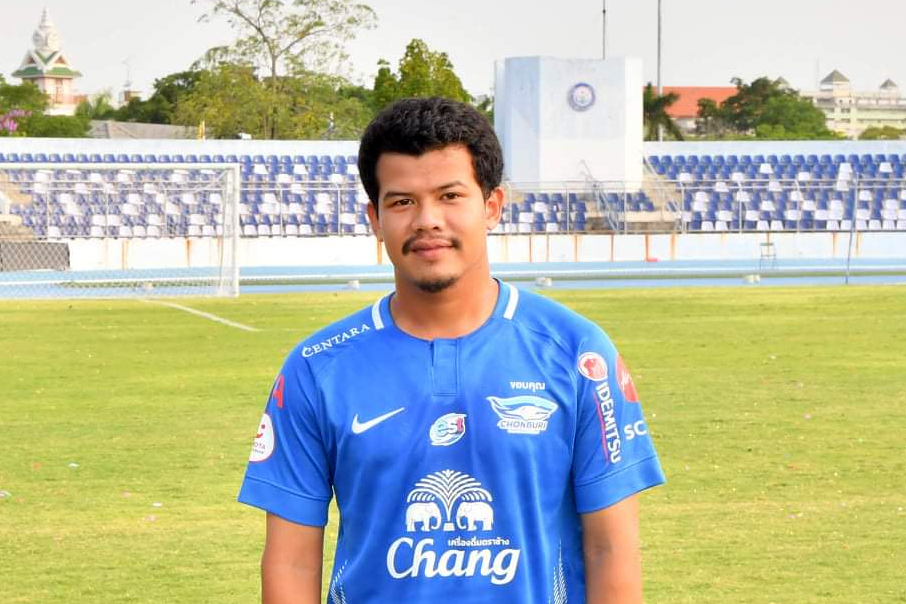

Personal information
- Full name: Saharat Sontisawat
- Date of birth: 13 January 1998 (age 28)
- Place of birth: Chachoengsao, Thailand
- Height: 1.68 m (5 ft 6 in)
- Position: Defensive midfielder

Team information
- Current team: Chonburi
- Number: 15

Youth career
- 2009–2015: Chonburi

Senior career*
Years	Team	Apps	(Gls)
2016–	Chonburi	143	(4)
2024	→ Trat (loan)	15	(0)
2025	→ Suphanburi (loan)	14	(1)
2025–2026	→ Rayong (loan)	26	(3)

International career
2014	Thailand U16	3	(0)
2016	Thailand U19	2	(0)
2017–2018	Thailand U21	3	(0)
- * Club domestic league appearances and goals as of 5 October 2025

Saharat Sontisawat (Thai: สหรัฐ สนธิสวัสดิ์, born 13 January 1998) is a Thai professional footballer who plays as a defensive midfielder for Thai League 1 club Chonburi.
