= Kroekrit Thaweekarn =

Thai footballer (born 1990)

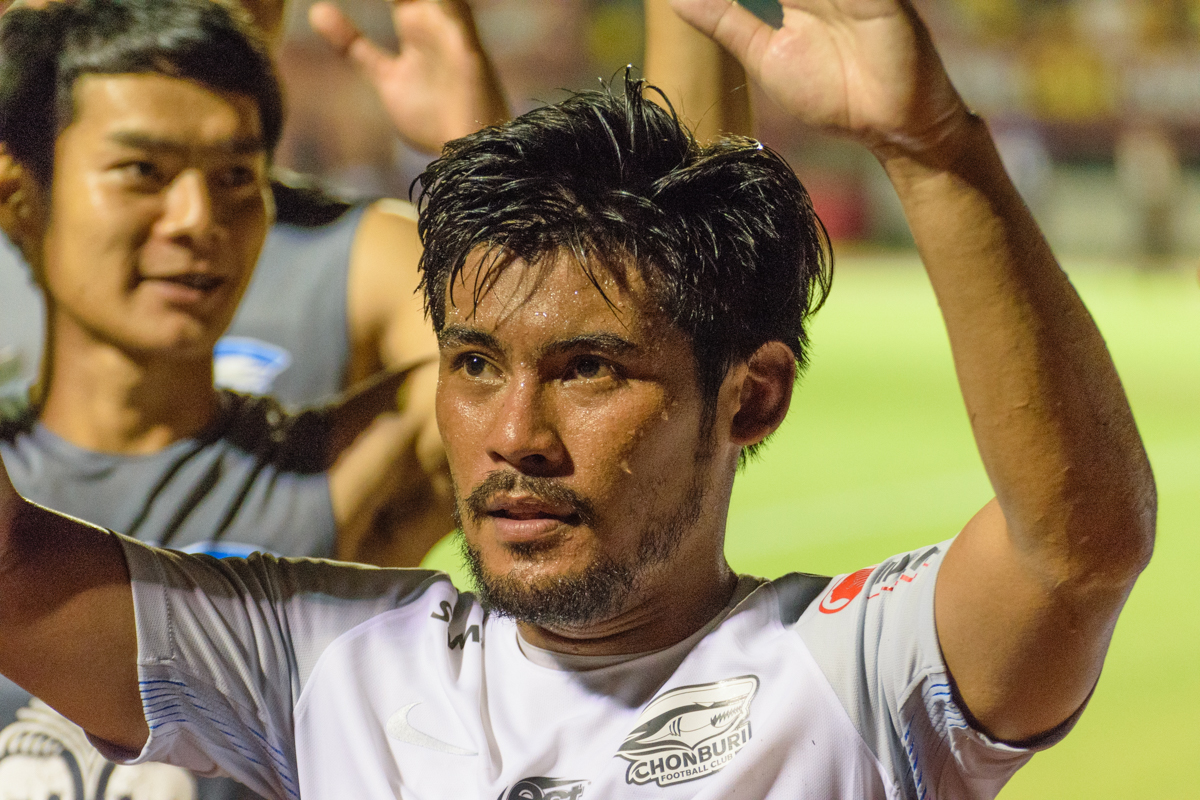

Personal information
- Full name: Kroekrit Thaweekarn
- Date of birth: 19 November 1990 (age 35)
- Place of birth: Kanchanadit, Surat Thani, Thailand
- Height: 1.64 m (5 ft 4 1/2 in)
- Position: Left winger

Team information
- Current team: Roi Et PB United
- Number: 7

Youth career
- 2004–2007: Princess Chulabhorn's College Chonburi

Senior career*
Years	Team	Apps	(Gls)
2008–2011	Sriracha	77	(18)
2012–2024	Chonburi	217	(16)
2012	→ Esan United (loan)	16	(2)
2013–2014	→ Singhtarua (loan)	19	(3)
2023	→ Nakhon Si United (loan)	13	(0)
2024–	Roi Et PB United	0	(0)

International career^{‡}
2008–2009	Thailand U19	14	(9)
2011–2014	Thailand U23	24	(5)
2013–2019	Thailand	34	(7)
Medal record
Representing Thailand
SEA Games
Gold medal – first place	Naypyidaw 2013	Team
AFF Championship
Winner	Singapore-Vietnam 2014	Team
Winner	Myanmar-Philippines 2016	Team
- * Club domestic league appearances and goals as of 30 April 2023 ‡ National team caps and goals as of 25 November 2016

Kroekrit Thaweekarn (Thai: เกริกฤทธิ์ ทวีกาญจน์; RTGS: Kroek-rit Thawikan) is a Thai professional footballer who plays as a left winger.

== International career ==
Kroekrit represented Thailand at three consecutive SEA Games in 2009, 2011 and 2013, as well as the 2014 Asian Games.

He made his debut for the senior team in a 5–1 friendly win against China PR.

On 9 November 2014, Kroekrit scored his first senior international goal in a friendly match against the Philippines. He won the 2014 AFF Championship with Thailand and scored three goals at the tournament, two against the Philippines in the semi-finals and one against Malaysia in the first leg of the final.

=== International goals ===
==== Senior ====
#	Date	Venue	Opponent	Score	Result	Competition
1.	November 9, 2014	80th Birthday Stadium, Nakhon Ratchasima, Thailand	Philippines	3–0	3-0	Friendly
2.	December 10, 2014	Rajamangala Stadium, Bangkok, Thailand	Philippines	2–0	3–0	2014 AFF Championship
3.	December 10, 2014	Rajamangala Stadium, Bangkok, Thailand	Philippines	3–0	3–0	2014 AFF Championship
4.	December 17, 2014	Rajamangala Stadium, Bangkok, Thailand	Malaysia	2–0	2-0	2014 AFF Championship
5.	October 13, 2015	Mỹ Đình National Stadium, Hanoi, Vietnam	Vietnam	1–0	3–0	2018 FIFA World Cup qualification
6.	June 5, 2016	Rajamangala Stadium, Bangkok, Thailand	Jordan	1–0	2–0	2016 King's Cup
7.	June 5, 2016	Rajamangala Stadium, Bangkok, Thailand	Jordan	2–0	2–0	2016 King's Cup

== Honours ==
=== International ===
Thailand U-23

- SEA Games Gold Medal (1): 2013

Thailand

- AFF Championship (2): 2014, 2016
- King's Cup (1): 2016
