= Hu (surname) =

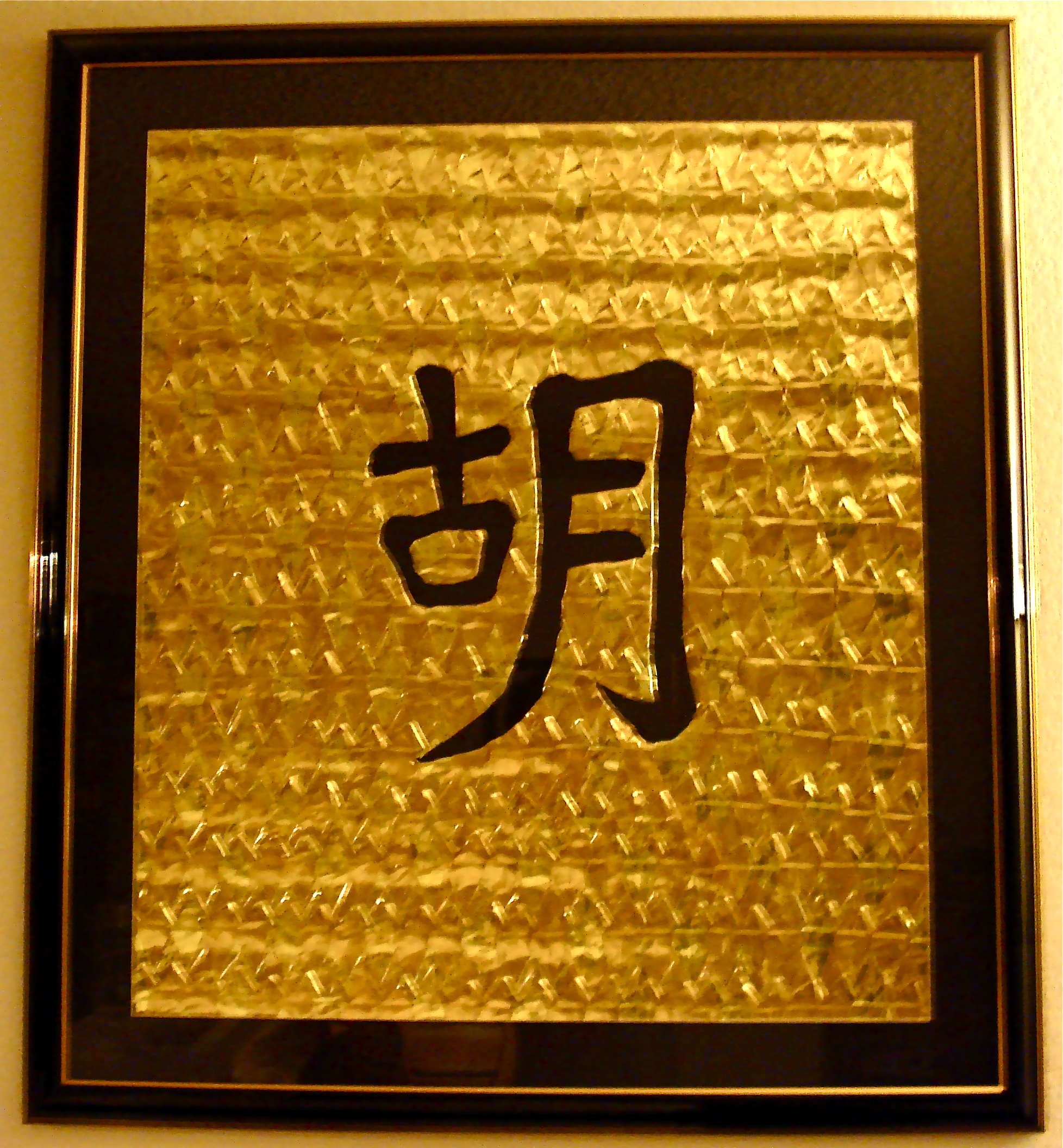

Chinese name
- Chinese: 胡
Transcriptions
Standard Mandarin
- Hanyu Pinyin: Hú
- Wade–Giles: Hu
Wu
- Romanization: ghu
Yue: Cantonese
- Yale Romanization: Wùh
- Jyutping: Wu4
Southern Min
- Hokkien POJ: Hô; Ô·
Eastern Min
- Fuzhou BUC: Hù

Vietnamese name
- Vietnamese alphabet: Hồ

Korean name
- Hangul: 호
Transcriptions
- Revised Romanization: Ho

Japanese name
- Kanji: 胡
Transcriptions
- Romanization: Ko

Hu (胡) is a Chinese surname. In 2006, it was the 15th most common surname in China. In 2013, it was the 13th most common in China, with 13.7 million Chinese sharing this surname. In 2019, Hu dropped to 15th most common surname in mainland China.

Some other, less common surnames pronounced Hu include 瓠, 護, 戶, 扈, 虎, 呼, 忽, 斛 and 壶. In Cantonese, “胡” is also pronounced as "Wu" or "Woo".

== Meaning ==
In Classical Chinese, hú 胡 meant: "dewlap; wattle" and was a variant Chinese character for "how; why; what" (he 何), "long-lasting; far-reaching" (xia 遐), "part of a dagger-axe", hu- in "butterfly" (hudie 蝴蝶), or possibly "Northern Barbarians".

== History ==
According to tradition, the Hu (胡) surname has several historical origins. First, Hu could derive from the family of Duke Hu of Chen. King Wu of Zhou (r. 1046-043 BCE) enfeoffed his son-in-law Gui Man 媯滿 (supposedly a descendant of the legendary sage king Emperor Shun) with the state of Chen (in modern Henan Province). His posthumous name was Duke Hu, and his descendants adopted Hu as their surname. Second, Hu could derive from two Zhou vassal states named Hu 胡, one located near Luohe (Henan Province) or another near Fuyang (Anhui Province). Third, Hu could derive from non-Chinese people adopting it as their surname. For example, in the 496 Change of Xianbei names to Han names, Hegu/Gegu 紇骨 was changed to Hu 胡. Fourth, Hu could derive from the clan name of the ancient Tiele people within the Xiongnu confederation.

Non-Chinese peoples and ethnic minorities in China sometimes took the Chinese exonym for their ethnic group as their surname. The best example is Hu 胡, which was anciently used to refer to "barbarian" groups on the northern and western frontiers of China.

Hu (胡) was used for various northern and western peoples of non-Han Chinese stock. It has been used for people of Persian, Sogdian, Turkic, Xianbi, Indian and Kushan origin and occasionally for the Xiongnu (probably because of their connections with the Tonghu or Eastern Hu – a separate tribe conquered by the Xiongnu).

Two historically significant Hu names are Donghu 東胡 (literally "Eastern Barbarians") "ancient Mongolian nomadic group" and the Wu Hu 五胡 ("Five Barbarians") "five nomadic tribes involved in the Wu Hu uprising" (304-316 CE) against the Jin dynasty. Hu (Foochow Romanized: Hù; POJ: Hô or Ô) was also one of the eight surnames of the first Han Chinese clans who first moved out the Central Plains into Fujian province (八姓入閩; Foochow Romanized: Báik Sáng Ĭk Mìng) during this conflict.

The Hồ 胡 clan which founded the Hồ dynasty in Vietnam originated in Zhejiang province of China.

The Hu family of Xidi are descended from Hu Shiliang, from Wuyuan, who was a descendant of Hu Changyi, a son of Emperor Zhaozong of Tang who was adopted by the Wuyuan Hu family.

Based on a study in 2020, Hu is a common surname in Italy due to significant amount of immigration population from Zhejiang.

The surname 虎 (Hǔ), which means "Tiger", is rare in China to the point where many people are not aware that it is used as a surname. Some believe it comes from the name of a 4,300-year-old chancellor, while others believe it originates among the Hui Muslim minority.

== Notable people ==
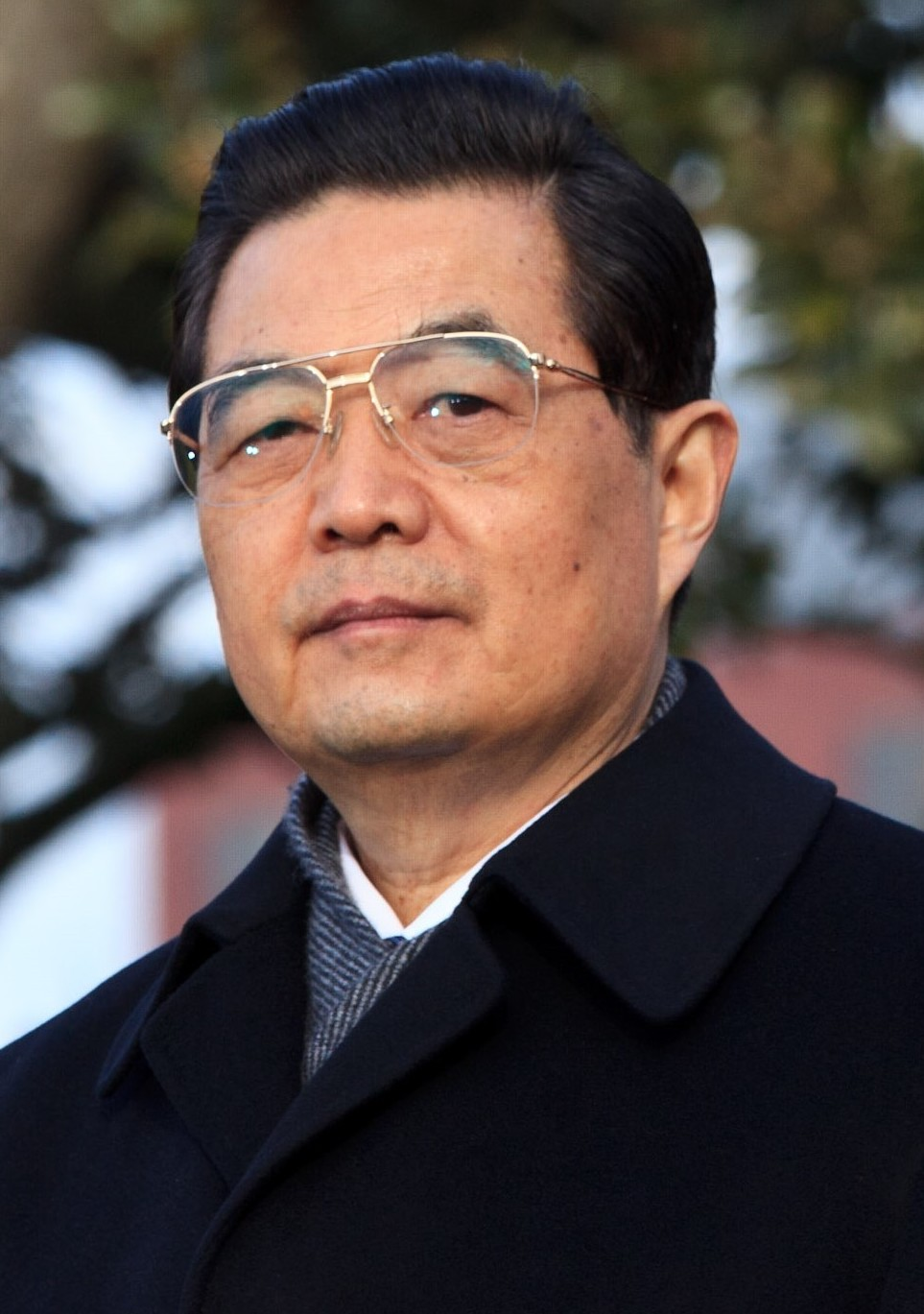
Hu Jintao (胡锦涛)

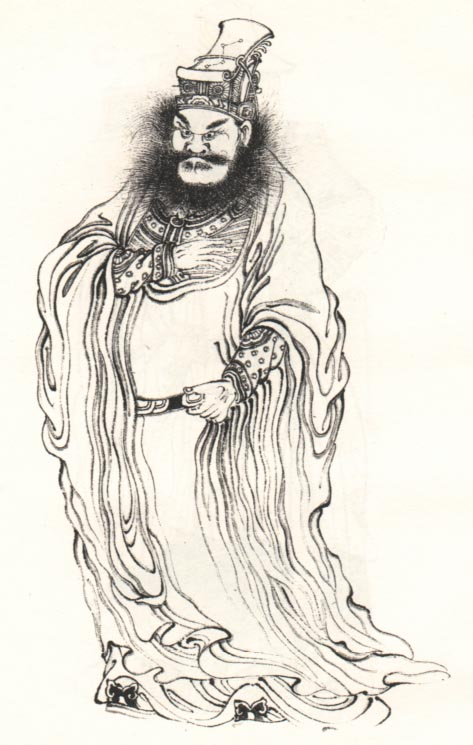
Hu Dahai (胡大海)

- Hu Angang, Tsinghua University professor
- Anna Hu, jewelry artist
- Hu Bin, Chinese freestyle swimmer
- Aw Boon Haw 胡文虎, Burmese Chinese entrepreneur and philanthropist, founder of Tiger Balm
- Aw Boon Par 胡文豹, Burmese Chinese entrepreneur and philanthropist
- Hu Chen-pu, Minister of Veterans Affairs Commission of the ROC (2007–2008)
- Aw Cheng Chye, Singaporean millionaire and philanthropist
- Chih-Wei Hu, MLB pitcher
- Chin-lung Hu (born 1984), MLB player
- Hu Chuanzhi, CEO of the China State Shipbuilding Corporation
- Hu Chunhua 胡春华, member of the 18th and 19th Politburo of the Chinese Communist Party
- Hu Dahai, 14th century Hui Muslim general
- David Hu, IIG cofounder sentenced to prison for running a Ponzi scheme
- David Hu, American mathematician, roboticist, and biologist
- Hu Denghui 胡登辉, former Chinese international footballer
- Hu Die, actress, "Movie Queen" of the 1930s
- Evelyn Hu, Harvard University professor of applied physics and engineering
- Evelyn Hu-DeHart, Brown University professor of history and American studies
- Hu Feng 胡风, Chinese writer and theorist of arts and literature
- Hu Fo, Taiwanese political scientist and activist
- Frank Hu, Harvard University professor of medicine and public health
- Hu Ge 胡歌 (born 1982), actor
- Hu Huaibang, banker sentenced to life in prison
- Hu Haichang (1928–2011), Chinese mechanical and aerospace engineer
- Hu Haiyan, Chinese academician and scientist
- Hu Hanmin, Kuomintang politician
- Hu Hesheng (1928–2024), Chinese mathematician
- Jayley Woo and her twin sister Hayley Woo (born 27 December 1991), Singaporean actresses
- Jason Hu 胡志强, Republic of China politician
- Hu Jia 胡佳, pro-democracy activist in the People's Republic of China
- Jianying Hu, American engineer
- Hu Jimin (1919–1998), Chinese nuclear and plasma physicist and educator
- Hu Jintao 胡锦涛, former General Secretary of the Chinese Communist Party and the paramount leader of China
- Hu Jinqiu (born 1997), Chinese basketball player
- Julia Hu (born 1985), American entrepreneur
- Hu Jun (born 1968), Chinese actor
- Kelly Hu 胡凯丽 (born 1968), American actress
- Oh Laye Koh 胡立国, Singaporean bus driver and convicted killer
- Hu Lanqi 胡兰畦, one of the first women generals of the Republic of China and later Communist revolutionary
- Hu Lien 胡璉, Chinese Nationalist general
- Hu Mei (Ming dynasty), sentenced to death by Zhu Yuanzhang
- Myolie Wu 胡杏兒, Hong Kong singer and actress
- Hu Nai-yuan, Taiwanese violinist
- Nan Hu, Chinese physician-scientist, molecular geneticist, and cancer epidemiologist
- Nancy Wu 胡定欣, Hong Kong actress and singer
- Nian Hu, real name of American musician Nina Dopamine
- Hu Ning (1916–1997), Chinese theoretical physicist and educator
- Hu Peizhao, Chinese economist and a professor at Xiamen University
- Hu Ping Chinese actress
- Hu Qiaomu 胡乔木, People's Republic of China politician
- Hu Qili 胡启立, member of the 13th Politburo Standing Committee of the Chinese Communist Party
- Hu Qinwu, Chinese painter and artist
- Richard Hu (胡赐道; 1926–2023), Finance Minister of Singapore
- S. Jack Hu, University of Georgia administrator and professor of engineering
- Hu Sheng, Chinese Marxist theorist and historian
- Hu Shih 胡适, Chinese writer and scholar
- Hu Songshan 虎嵩山, Chinese Hui Muslim Imam of the Yihewani sect
- T. C. Hu (胡德强, 1930–2021), Chinese-American computer scientist
- Hu Ting-ting (born 1979), English-born Taiwanese actress
- Hailan Hu, Chinese neuroscientist
- Valerie Hu, American biochemist
- Hu Weide 胡惟德, politician and diplomat of the Qing dynasty and the Republic of China
- Wei-Shau Hu, American geneticist
- Wei-Shou Hu, Taiwanese-American chemical engineer
- Hu Weiyong, sentenced to death by Zhu Yuanzhang
- Wen-mei Hwu 胡文美, American computer engineer
- Yuen Pau Woo 胡元豹, Canadian senator and facilitator of the Independent Senators Group
- Hu Xiansu (胡先骕; 1894–1968) Chinese botanist
- Gordon Ying Sheung Wu 胡應湘, chairman of the board of Hopewell Holdings Ltd.
- Hu Yaobang 胡耀邦, former chairman and General Secretary of the Chinese Communist Party
- Hu Yepin 胡也频, Chinese writer, poet, and playwright, prominent Chinese socialist
- Yi Hu, American engineer
- Hu Yicheng (born 1998), Chinese trampoline gymnast
- Yinling Hu, Chinese molecular biologist
- Hu Yitian 胡一天, Chinese actor
- Yuenyong Opakul, Thai singer, musician, songwriter and entrepreneur
- Hu Zaobin 胡藻斌, early 20th-century Chinese painter, famous for painting tigers
- Hu Zhongzao, sentenced to death by the Qianlong emperor
- Hu Zongnan, Chinese general in the National Revolutionary Army
- Hu Zongxian 胡宗憲, Chinese general during the Ming dynasty
- Hồ Chí Minh 胡志明, 20th century Vietnamese communist leader
- Hồ dynasty of Vietnam 胡朝:

- Hồ Quý Ly 胡季犛
- Hồ Hán Thương 胡漢蒼

== See also ==
- Ho, variant of surname Hu
- Oh or Ow, Fujian variant of surname Hu
