= China national football team results (1950–1969) =

This article lists the results for the China PR national football team between 1950 and 1969

Key
Win
Draw
Defeat

== 1950s ==
Date	Venue	Opponents	Score	Competition	Scorers
4 August 1952	Helsinki, Finland	Finland	0–4	Friendly	
17 June 1956	New Delhi, India	India	1–0	Friendly	Cong Zheyu
25 June 1956	Rangoon, Burma	Burma	3–2^{1}	Friendly	Zhang Honggen (2), Nian Weisi
9 August 1956	Belgrade, SFR Yugoslavia	Yugoslavia	0–4^{1}	Friendly	
19 August 1956	Ljubljana, SFR Yugoslavia	(Socialist Republic of Slovenia) Slovenia	2–5^{1}	Friendly	Miao, Ling
4 October 1956	Beijing, China	North Vietnam	5–3^{1}	1956 Friendship Tournament	
7 October 1956	Beijing, China	North Korea	0–1	1956 Friendship Tournament	
12 May 1957	Jakarta, Indonesia	Indonesia	0–2	1958 FIFA World Cup qualification	
2 June 1957	Beijing, China	Indonesia	4–3	1958 FIFA World Cup qualification	Zhang Honggen, Nian Weisi, Sun Fucheng, Wang Lu
23 June 1957	Rangoon, Burma	Indonesia	0–0	1958 FIFA World Cup qualification	
27 June 1957	Rangoon, Burma	Burma	1–2	Friendly	Cong Zheyu
21 July 1957	Beijing, China	Sudan	4–1	Friendly	
9 July 1959	Oradea, Romania	Romania	1–2^{1}	Friendly	Zhang Honggen
3 October 1959	Beijing, China	Soviet Union	0–1	Friendly	
25 October 1959	Pyongyang, Korea DPR	North Korea	0–1	1959 Friendship Tournament	
28 October 1959	Pyongyang, Korea DPR	North Vietnam	2–0^{1}	1959 Friendship Tournament	
1: Non FIFA 'A' international match

== 1960s ==
Date	Venue	Opponents	Score	Competition	Scorers
4 October 1960	Hanoi, North Vietnam	North Korea	1–0	1960 Friendship Tournament	Sun Yuanyun
7 October 1960	Hanoi, North Vietnam	Mongolia	6–1^{1}	1960 Friendship Tournament	Zhou Xing (2), Sun Yunshan (2), Chen Jialiang, Xian Dixiong
11 October 1960	Hanoi, North Vietnam	North Vietnam	4–3^{1}	1960 Friendship Tournament	Chen Jialiang (2), Cong Zheyu, Sun Yunshan
14 January 1963	Rangoon, Burma	Burma	3–0	Friendly	
20 January 1963	Rangoon, Burma	Burma	1–2	Friendly	Sun Yunshan
26 January 1963	Dhaka, Pakistan	Pakistan	0–0	Friendly	
30 January 1963	Peshawar, Pakistan	Pakistan	2–3	Friendly	Chen Jialiang, Zhang Honggen
3 February 1963	Lahore, Pakistan	Pakistan	1–1	Friendly	
7 February 1963	Karachi, Pakistan	Pakistan	2–0	Friendly	Zhang Kunyue, Chen Jiagen
25 April 1963	Jakarta, Indonesia	North Vietnam	1–0^{1}	1963 Piala Soekarno	
27 April 1963	Jakarta, Indonesia	Cambodia	6–0	1963 Piala Soekarno	
30 April 1963	Jakarta, Indonesia	United Arab Republic	0–2	1963 Piala Soekarno	
19 May 1963	Bandung, Indonesia	Indonesia	2–1	Friendly	
17 August 1963	Beijing, China	Indonesia	3–0^{1}	Friendly	Sun Yunshan (2), Li Xuejun
4 September 1963	Beijing, China	Burma	4–0	Friendly	Chen Jiagen (2), Li Xuejun, Zhang Honggen
12 November 1963	Jakarta, Indonesia	Mali	3–1^{1}	1963 GANEFO	Zhang Junlang, Chen Jiagen, Li Xuejun
16 November 1963	Jakarta, Indonesia	Indonesia	1–1^{1}	1963 GANEFO	Chen Jiagen
3 October 1964	Beijing, China	Pakistan	0–2	Friendly	
3 August 1965	Pyongyang, Korea DPR	North Vietnam	3–3^{1}	1965 GANEFO	
5 August 1965	Pyongyang, Korea DPR	North Korea	0–3^{1}	1965 GANEFO	
7 August 1965	Pyongyang, Korea DPR	Guinea	2–0	1965 GANEFO	
9 August 1965	Pyongyang, Korea DPR	Indonesia	3–0	1965 GANEFO	
11 August 1965	Pyongyang, Korea DPR	Cambodia	3–1	1965 GANEFO	
28 June 1966	Beijing, China	Tanzania	10–4	Friendly	Hu Denghui (3), Chen Jiagen (3), Zhang Zhongwei (2), Yi Qiuwen, Wang Houjun
23 July 1966	Beijing, China	Syria	6–0	Friendly	
28 August 1966	Beijing, China	Mali	4–0	Friendly	
28 November 1966	Phnom Penh, Cambodia	Palestine	7–0^{1}	1966 GANEFO	
30 November 1966	Phnom Penh, Cambodia	North Yemen	6–0^{1}	1966 GANEFO	
2 December 1966	Phnom Penh, Cambodia	North Vietnam	2–0^{1}	1966 GANEFO	
4 December 1966	Phnom Penh, Cambodia	Cambodia	4–0	1966 GANEFO	
6 December 1966	Phnom Penh, Cambodia	North Korea	1–2	1966 GANEFO	
1: Non FIFA 'A' international match
