= North Vietnam national football team results =

Football results

This article provides details of international football games played by the North Vietnam national football team.

Several match results are missing, such as friendly matches against Laos in 1963, or matches in training camps in Bulgaria, Hungary, Romania or in Soviet Union.

== Results ==
Keynotes
Win
Draw
Defeat

=== 1956 ===
2 October 1956 Hybrid friendly	Guangxi (China)	1–3	North Vietnam	Nanning, China
		Report

4 October 1956 1956 Friendship Tournament	China	5–3	North Vietnam	Beijing, China
		Report		Stadium: Xiannongtan Stadium

10 October 1956 1956 Friendship Tournament	North Vietnam	0–3	North Korea	Beijing, China
		Report		Stadium: Xiannongtan Stadium

16 October 1956 Hybrid friendly	Wuhan (China)	1–2	North Vietnam	Wuhan, China
		Report	Trương An Trung 46'; Trương Ánh Nghĩa 66'

24 October 1956 Hybrid friendly	Guangdong (China)	3–0	North Vietnam	Nanning, China
		Report

=== 1957 ===
26 May 1957 Friendly	North Vietnam	0–1	Cambodia	Hanoi, North Vietnam

November 1957 Friendly	Cambodia	1–1	North Vietnam	Phnom Penh, Cambodia
		Report

=== 1958 ===
August 1958 Friendly	North Vietnam	1–3	Cambodia	Hanoi, North Vietnam

=== 1959 ===
September 1959 Hybrid friendly	North Vietnam	0–8	(Czechoslovakia) Spartak ZJŠ Brno	Hanoi, North Vietnam
		Report		Stadium: Hàng Đẫy Stadium

September 1959 Hybrid friendly	North Vietnam	1–6	(Czechoslovakia) Spartak ZJŠ Brno	Hanoi, North Vietnam
		Report		Stadium: Hàng Đẫy Stadium

September 1959 Hybrid friendly	North Vietnam	3–4	Iraq Army	Hanoi, North Vietnam
		Report	Ammo Baba	Stadium: Hàng Đẫy Stadium; Attendance: 25,000

September 1959 Hybrid friendly	North Vietnam	Unknown	(Romania) Petrolul Ploiești	Hanoi, North Vietnam
		Report		Stadium: Hàng Đẫy Stadium

22 October 1959 1959 Friendship Tournament	North Korea	5–0	North Vietnam	Pyongyang, North Korea
		Report

28 October 1959 1959 Friendship Tournament	China	2–0	North Vietnam	Pyongyang, North Korea
		Report

15 November 1959 Hybrid friendly	North Vietnam	0–4	(Russian Soviet Federative Socialist Republic) Russian SFSR	Hanoi, North Vietnam
		Report		Stadium: Hàng Đẫy Stadium

22 November 1959 Hybrid friendly	North Vietnam	0–5	FLN	Hanoi, North Vietnam
				Stadium: Hàng Đẫy Stadium

December 1959 Hybrid friendly	North Vietnam	1–0	Poland Army	Hanoi, North Vietnam
				Stadium: Hàng Đẫy Stadium

December 1959 Hybrid friendly	Phnom Penh (Cambodia)	0–2	North Vietnam	Phnom Penh, Cambodia
		Report

December 1959 Friendly	Cambodia	1–2	North Vietnam	Phnom Penh, Cambodia
		Report

=== 1960 ===
3 December 1960 1960 Friendship Tournament	North Vietnam	3–1	Mongolia	Hanoi, North Vietnam
		Report		Stadium: Hàng Đẫy Stadium

8 December 1960 1960 Friendship Tournament	North Vietnam	1–3	North Korea	Hanoi, North Vietnam
		Report		Stadium: Hàng Đẫy Stadium

11 December 1960 1960 Friendship Tournament	North Vietnam	3–4	China	Hanoi, North Vietnam
	Trương Tấn Nghĩa (?); Lưu Đình Tòng (?), 86'	Report	Chen Jialiang; Cong Zheyu; Sun Yunshan; Zhang Honggen 90'	Stadium: Hàng Đẫy Stadium

=== 1962 ===
22 September 1962 Hybrid friendly	SKA Lviv (Ukrainian Soviet Socialist Republic)	3–1	North Vietnam	Lviv, Soviet Union
		Report

October 1962 Hybrid friendly	Dubna (Russian Soviet Federative Socialist Republic)	1–1	North Vietnam	Dubna, Soviet Union
		Report

11 November 1962 Friendly	Cambodia	1–3	North Vietnam	Phnom Penh, Cambodia
		Report

November 1962 Friendly	Cambodia	1–1	North Vietnam	Phnom Penh, Cambodia
		Report

6 December 1962 Hybrid friendly	North Vietnam	0–0	Moldavian SSR	Hanoi, North Vietnam
		Report		Stadium: Hàng Đẫy Stadium

=== 1963 ===
February 1963 Friendly	North Vietnam	2–0	Cambodia	Hanoi, North Vietnam
		Report

March 1963 Friendly	North Vietnam	Unknown	Laos	Hanoi, North Vietnam

25 April 1963 1963 Piala Soekarno	North Vietnam	0–1	China	Jakarta, Indonesia
		Report		Stadium: Gelora Senayan Main Stadium

26 April 1963 1963 Piala Soekarno	North Vietnam	3–2	Cambodia	Jakarta, Indonesia
	Văn Sỹ Chi 89'	Report		Stadium: Gelora Senayan Main Stadium

29 April 1963 1963 Piala Soekarno	Indonesia	3–1	North Vietnam	Jakarta, Indonesia
		Report		Stadium: Gelora Senayan Main Stadium

October 1963 Friendly	North Vietnam	1–1	Burma	Hanoi, North Vietnam
	Văn Sỹ Chi	Report

12 November 1963 1963 GANEFO	North Vietnam	1–4	United Arab Republic	Jakarta, Indonesia
		Report		Stadium: Gelora Senayan Main Stadium

13 November 1963 1963 GANEFO	Laos	1–9	North Vietnam	Jakarta, Indonesia
		Report		Stadium: Gelora Senayan Main Stadium

14 November 1963 1963 GANEFO	Chile University XI	2–4	North Vietnam	Jakarta, Indonesia
		Report		Stadium: Gelora Senayan Main Stadium

18 November 1963 1963 GANEFO	North Vietnam	6–1	Argentina University XI	Jakarta, Indonesia
		Report		Stadium: Gelora Senayan Main Stadium

19 November 1963 1963 GANEFO	North Korea	2–0	North Vietnam	Jakarta, Indonesia
		Report		Stadium: Gelora Senayan Main Stadium

21 November 1963 1963 GANEFO	Uruguay University XI	2–2	North Vietnam	Jakarta, Indonesia
		Report		Stadium: Gelora Senayan Main Stadium

=== 1964 ===
Unknown 1964 Hybrid friendly	Tatran Prešov (Czechoslovakia)	1–3	North Vietnam	Prešov, Czechoslovakia
			Trương Tấn Nghĩa (?)

9 August 1964 Hybrid friendly	Oryol (Russian Soviet Federative Socialist Republic)	1–1	North Vietnam	Oryol, Soviet Union
		Report

12 August 1964 Hybrid friendly	Tralflotovets Murmansk (Russian Soviet Federative Socialist Republic)	1–1	North Vietnam	Murmansk, Soviet Union
		Report

15 August 1964 Hybrid friendly	Volga Ulyanovsk (Russian Soviet Federative Socialist Republic)	2–0	North Vietnam	Ulyanovsk, Soviet Union
		Report

December 1964 Hybrid friendly	North Vietnam	2–4	(China) Tianjin	Hanoi, North Vietnam
		Report

=== 1965 ===
Unknown 1965 Hybrid friendly	North Vietnam	1–0	East Germany U-18	Hanoi, North Vietnam
	Từ Như Hiển	Report		Stadium: Hàng Đẫy Stadium

2 August 1965 1965 GANEFO	North Korea	1–0	North Vietnam	Pyongyang, North Korea
		Report		Stadium: Moranbong Stadium

3 August 1965 1965 GANEFO	China	3–3	North Vietnam	Pyongyang, North Korea
		Report		Stadium: Moranbong Stadium

5 August 1965 1965 GANEFO	North Vietnam	2–1	Guinea	Pyongyang, North Korea
		Report		Stadium: Moranbong Stadium

8 August 1965 1965 GANEFO	North Vietnam	1–2	Indonesia	Pyongyang, North Korea
		Report		Stadium: Moranbong Stadium

10 August 1965 1965 GANEFO	North Vietnam	1–1	Cambodia	Pyongyang, North Korea
		Report		Stadium: Moranbong Stadium

=== 1966 ===
June 1966 Hybrid friendly	Dinamo Sokhumi (Georgian Soviet Socialist Republic)	2–2	North Vietnam	Sukhumi, Soviet Union
		Report

July 1966 Hybrid friendly	Amirani Ochamchire (Georgian Soviet Socialist Republic)	1–6	North Vietnam	Ochamchire, Soviet Union
		Report

July 1966 Hybrid friendly	Mziuri Gali (Georgian Soviet Socialist Republic)	4–3	North Vietnam	Gali, Soviet Union
		Report

July 1966 Hybrid friendly	Avanhard Chernigov (Ukrainian Soviet Socialist Republic)	4–2	North Vietnam	Chernigov, Soviet Union
		Report

July 1966 Hybrid friendly	Avtomobilist Sumy (Ukrainian Soviet Socialist Republic)	2–2	North Vietnam	Sumy, Soviet Union
		Report

July 1966 Hybrid friendly	Kolos Poltava (Ukrainian Soviet Socialist Republic)	2–0	North Vietnam	Poltava, Soviet Union
		Report

July 1966 Hybrid friendly	Dynamo Khmelnytskyi (Ukrainian Soviet Socialist Republic)	2–0	North Vietnam	Khmelnytskyi, Soviet Union
		Report

August 1966 Hybrid friendly	Avtomobilist Zhytomyr (Ukrainian Soviet Socialist Republic)	3–3	North Vietnam	Zhytomyr, Soviet Union
		Report

August 1966 Hybrid friendly	Torpedo Podolsk (Russian Soviet Federative Socialist Republic)	0–4	North Vietnam	Podolsk, Soviet Union
		Report

10 August 1966 Hybrid friendly	Soviet Union U-18	0–1	North Vietnam	Moscow, Soviet Union
		Report	Lê Thế Thọ	Stadium: Central Dynamo Stadium

August 1966 Hybrid friendly	February 8 (North Korea)	2–1	North Vietnam	Pyongyang, North Korea
		Report

August 1966 Hybrid friendly	Locomotive (North Korea)	1–2	North Vietnam	Pyongyang, North Korea
		Report

26 November 1966 1966 GANEFO	North Vietnam	9–0	North Yemen	Phnom Penh, Cambodia
		Report

27 November 1966 1966 GANEFO	North Vietnam	4–0	Palestine	Phnom Penh, Cambodia
		Report

28 November 1966 1966 GANEFO	North Vietnam	0–2	China	Phnom Penh, Cambodia
		Report

30 November 1966 1966 GANEFO	Cambodia	2–2	North Vietnam	Phnom Penh, Cambodia
		Report

6 December 1966 1966 GANEFO	North Korea	3–1	North Vietnam	Phnom Penh, Cambodia
		Report

=== 1970 ===
20 September 1970 Friendly	North Vietnam	2–1	Cuba	Hanoi, North Vietnam
	Đặng Ngọc Việt	Report

=== 1971 ===
Unknown 1971 Friendly	Cuba	1–1	North Vietnam	La Habana, Cuba
		Report	Từ Như Hiển

=== 1974 ===
27 December 1974 Friendly	North Vietnam	3–3	China	Hanoi, North Vietnam
		Report

== Head-to-head record ==
Key

Positive balance
Neutral balance
Negative balance

North Vietnam national football team head-to-head records
Opponent	Pld	W	D	L	GF	GA	GD	Win %	Confederation
Burma	1	0	1	0	1	1	0	00.00	AFC
Cambodia	10	4	4	2	16	13	+3	40.00	AFC
China	7	0	2	5	12	20	–8	00.00	AFC
Cuba	2	1	1	0	3	2	+1	50.00	CONCACAF
Guinea	1	1	0	0	2	1	+1	100.00	CAF
Indonesia	2	0	0	2	2	5	–3	00.00	AFC
Laos	1	1	0	0	9	1	+8	100.00	AFC
Mongolia	1	1	0	0	3	1	+2	100.00	AFC
North Korea	6	0	0	6	2	17	–15	00.00	AFC
North Yemen	1	1	0	0	9	0	+9	100.00	AFC
Palestine	1	1	0	0	4	0	+4	100.00	AFC
United Arab Republic	1	0	0	1	1	4	–3	00.00	CAF
Total	34	10	8	16	64	65	–1	29.41	
