= List of Vietnam international footballers born outside Vietnam =

This is a list of footballers who has represented the Vietnam national football team in international football and were born outside of Vietnam.

This list includes players who have dual citizenship with Vietnam and/or have become naturalized Vietnamese citizens. The players are ordered per modern-day country of birth; if the country at the time of birth differs from the current, this is indicated with a subsection.

== List ==
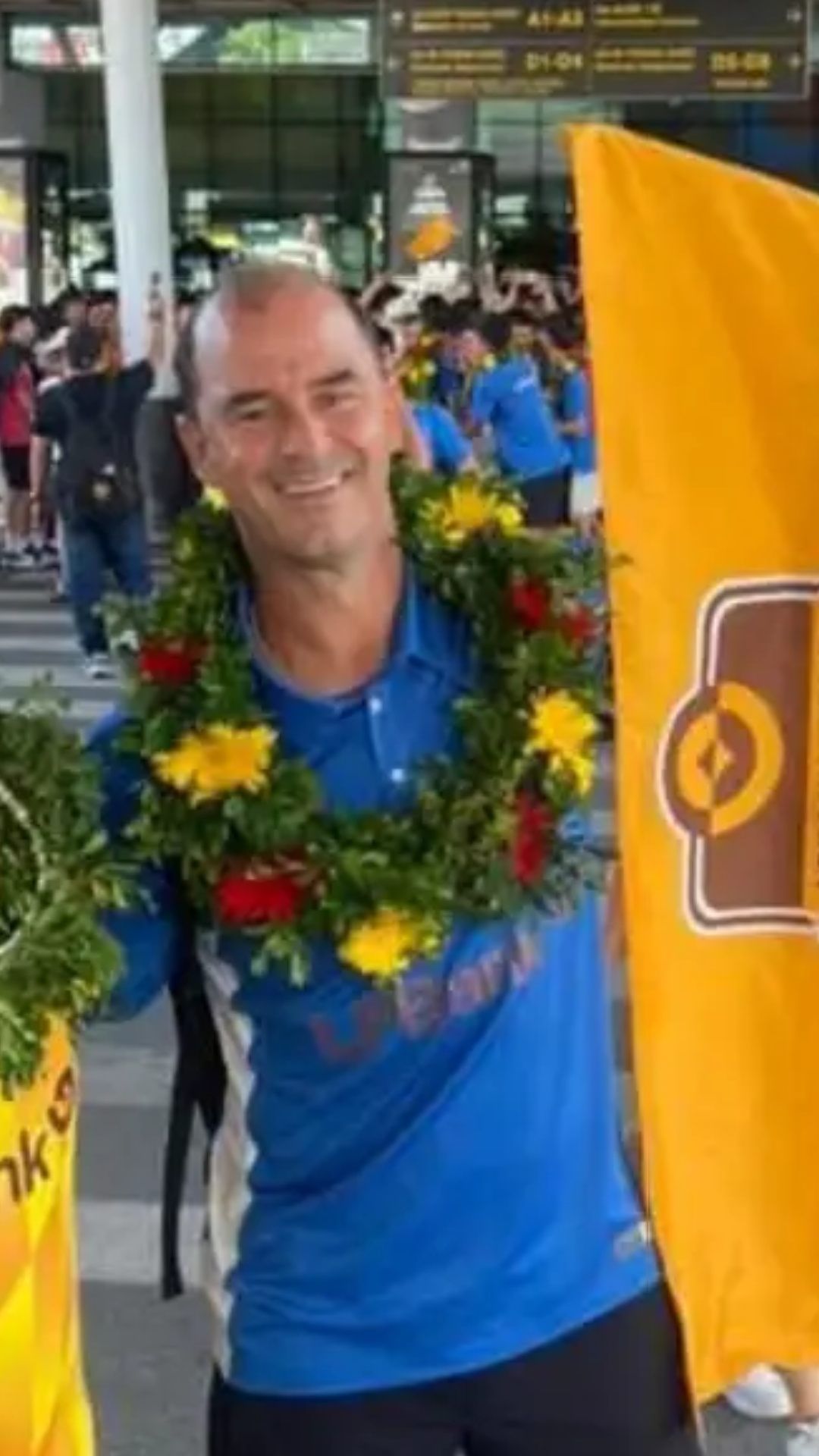
Huỳnh Kesley Alves was one of the first naturalized players to represent Vietnam.

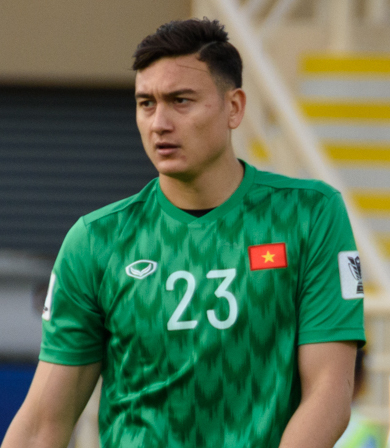
Đặng Văn Lâm made more than 40 appearances for Vietnam since his debut in 2015.

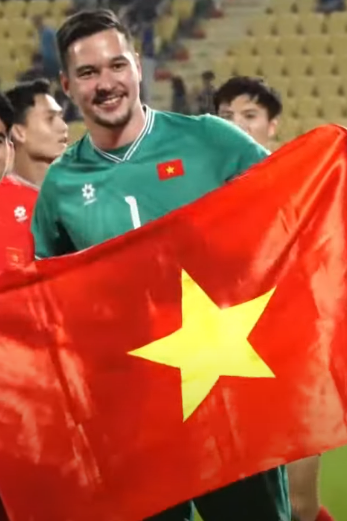
Nguyễn Filip had played for Vietnam since January 2024.

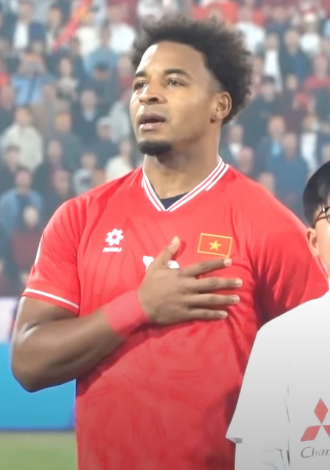
In 2024, Nguyễn Xuân Son became the first naturalized player without Vietnamese heritage to play for the team since 2009.

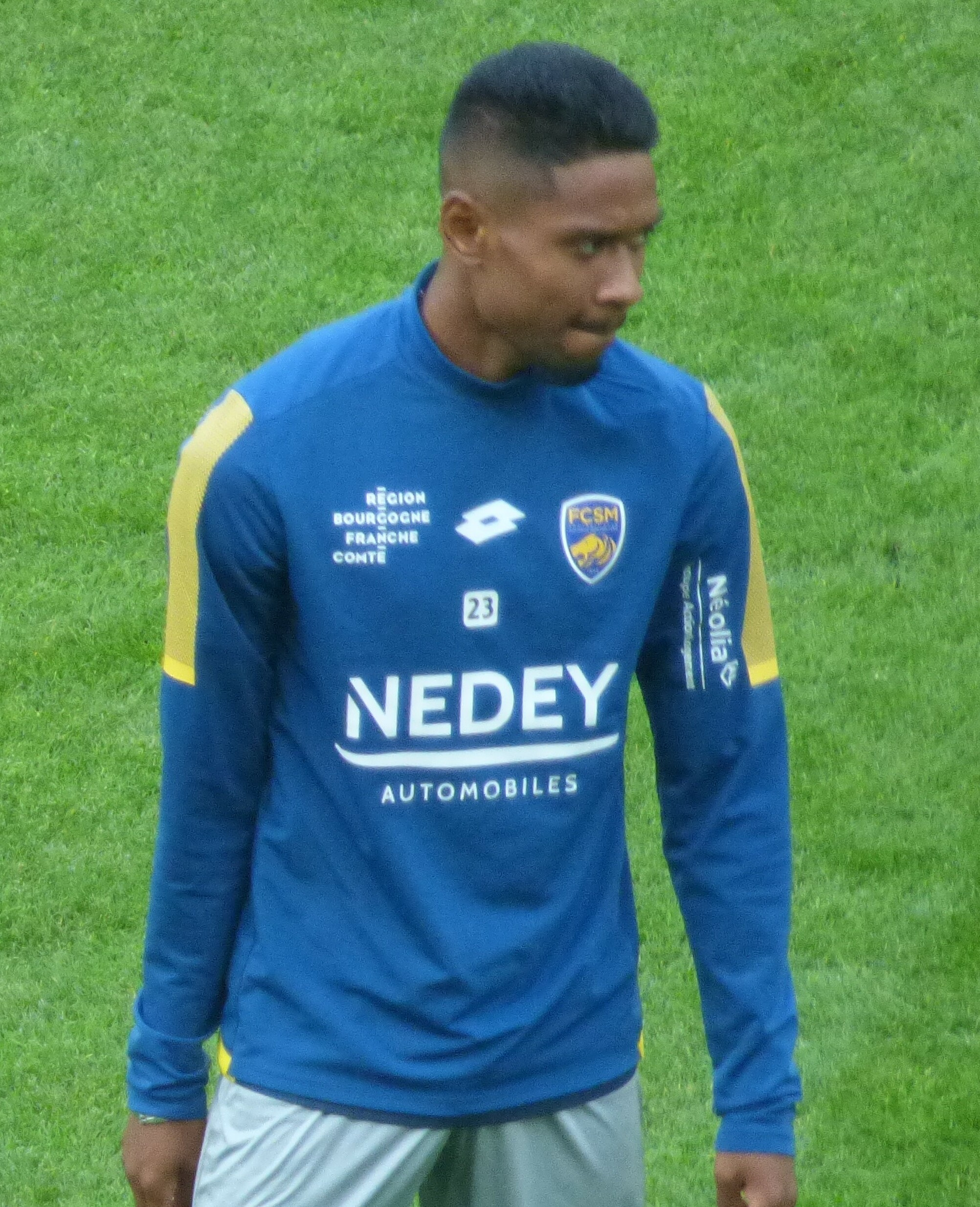
Cao Pendant Quang Vinh was the first French born player to represent Vietnam.

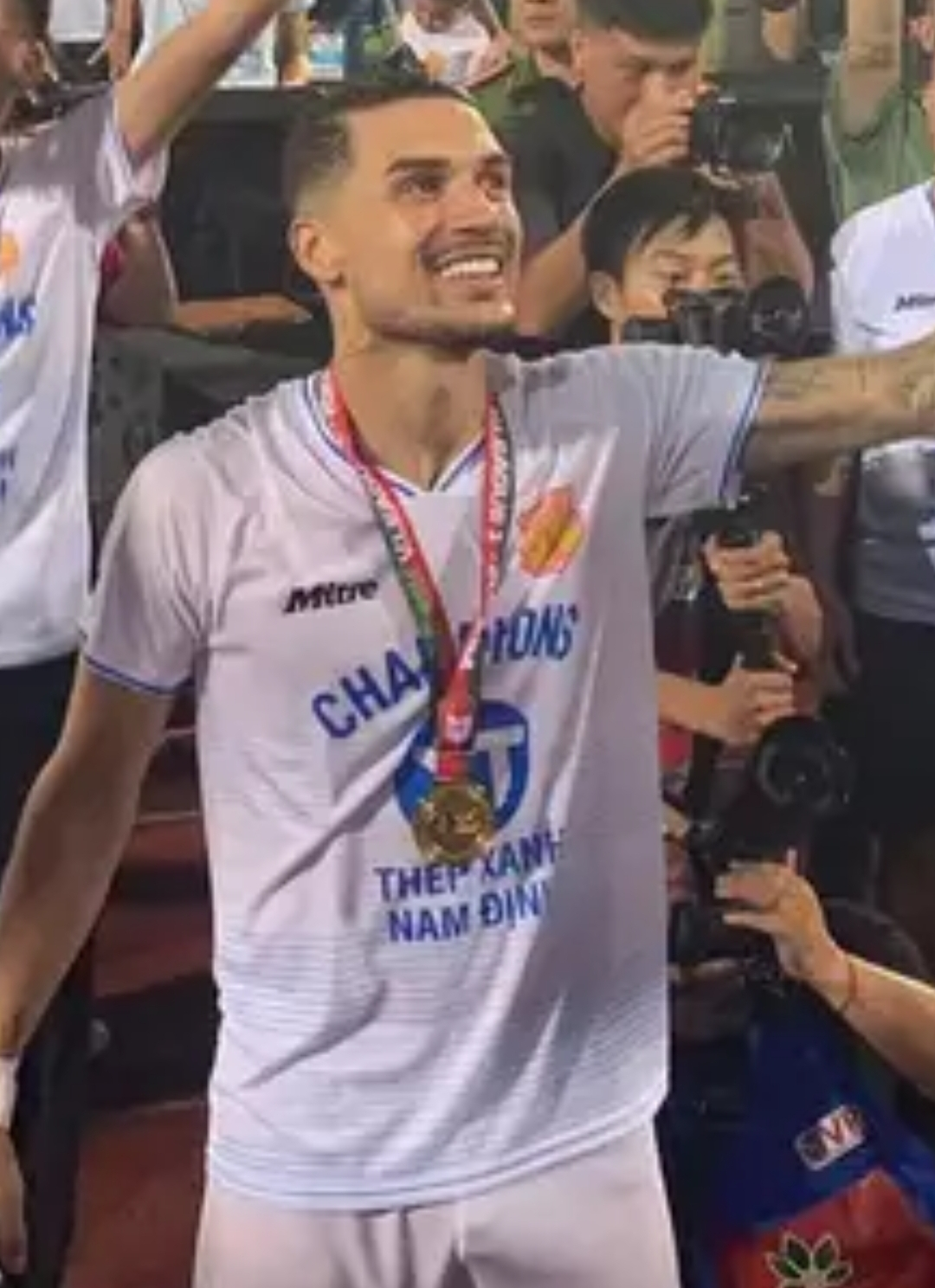
Đỗ Hoàng Hên made his debut with Vietnam in 2026.

Từ Như Hiển was one of the first footballers born outside Vietnam to represent the latter. Born in New Caledonia, Hiển repartriated in 1963 and made his debut for North Vietnam national team in 1965 and played for the team until the 1970s. However, since North Vietnam wasn't a member of FIFA and the AFC at the time, Hiển's records with the team weren't officially recognized by these organisations.

=== Pre-Unification ===
List of players born abroad that represented North Vietnam or South Vietnam:

Name	Birthyear	Place of birth	National career	Represented
Paul Paccini	1913	France (Bastia)	1949	State of Vietnam
Phạm Văn Hiếu	1921	Cambodia (Phnom Penh)	195?–1960	South Vietnam
Hoàng Ngọc Minh	1932	Laos (Thakhek)	1958–1960	North Vietnam
Từ Như Thành	1943	New Caledonia (Nouméa)	196?–196?	North Vietnam
Từ Như Hiển	1945	New Caledonia (Nouméa)	1965–197?	North Vietnam
Đỗ Cẩu	1946	Cambodia (Phnom Penh)	1972–1975	South Vietnam
Vương Tiến Dũng	1952	Thailand (Nong Khai)	196?–197?	North Vietnam

Since the reunified Vietnam national football team rejoined the international stage in 1991, the players born abroad with Vietnamese heritage, referred as the Việt kiều were always considered as an important part of team as many of them trained and played in countries where football is more developed than in Vietnam. The most notable players are Russian-born goalkeeper Đặng Văn Lâm, who contributed in Vietnam's successful 2018 AFF Championship and 2019 AFC Asian Cup campaign; and goalkeeper Nguyễn Filip, who started for Vietnam at the 2023 AFC Asian Cup. During a short period between 2008 and 2009, the Vietnam Football Federation allowed naturalized players without Vietnamese heritage to represent the country but reverted this decision shortly after, in order to "preserve national identity" in the team.

=== Post-Unification ===
As of 17 November 2026

==== Naturalized ====
Vietnamese name	Original name	Birthyear	Place of birth	National career	Caps	Goals
Phan Văn Santos	Fábio dos Santos	1977	Brazil (Rio de Janeiro)	2008	2	0
Đinh Hoàng La	Mykola Oleksandrovych Lytvoka	1979	Ukraine (Note: At the time part of the Ukrainian SSR (a part of the Soviet Union)) (Kyiv)	2009	1	0
Đinh Hoàng Max	Maxwell Eyerakpo	1986	Nigeria (Abuja)	2009	1	0
Huỳnh Kesley Alves	Kesley Alves	1981	Brazil (Palmeiras)	2009	1	0
Nguyễn Xuân Son	Rafaelson Bezerra Fernandes	1997	Brazil (Pirapemas)	2024–present	18	16
Đỗ Hoàng Hên	Hêndrio Araújo da Silva	1994	Brazil (São Paulo)	2026–present	13	3
Nguyễn Tài Lộc	Geovane Magno	1994	Brazil (Governador Valadares)	2026–present	11	0
Olaha Mạnh Đức	Michael Olaha	1997	Nigeria (Lagos)	2026–present	1	1

==== Players of Vietnamese descent ====
Vietnamese name	Original name	Birthyear	Place of birth	Vietnamese ancestry	National career	Caps	Goals
Nguyễn Liêm Thanh		1972	Cambodia (Phnom Penh)	Maternal	1995–1999	11	0
Nguyễn Michal	Michal Nguyen	1989	Czech Republic (Note: At the time part of Czechoslovakia) (Litvínov)	Paternal	2013	2	0
Đặng Văn Lâm		1993	Russia (Moscow)	Paternal	2015–present	48	0
Bùi Đức Duy	Adriano Schmidt	1994	Germany (Grimma)	Paternal	2022	1	0
Nguyễn Filip	Filip Nguyen	1992	Czech Republic (Prague)	Paternal	2024–present	13	0
Cao Pendant Quang Vinh	Jason Pendant	1997	France (Sarcelles)	Maternal	2025–present	9	0
Lê Giang Patrik	Patrik Le Giang	1992	Slovakia (Lučenec)	Paternal	2026–present	14	0
Nguyễn Adou Leygley Minh	Leygley Adou	1997	France (Grenoble)	Maternal	2026–present	4	0
Williams Minh Hoàng	Lee Williams	2007	England (Liverpool)	Maternal	2026–present	4	1
Ngô Đăng Khoa	Khoa Ngo	2006	Australia (Perth)	Both	2026–present	3	0
Lương Chí Khải	Kyle Colonna	1999	United States (Danville)	Maternal	2026–present	1	0
