= Vietnam national football team results =

This article lists the fixtures and results of the Vietnam national football team:

- North Vietnam national football team results
- South Vietnam national football team results
- Vietnam national football team results (1991–2009)
- Vietnam national football team results (2010–2019)
- Vietnam national football team results (2020–present)

== See also ==
- Vietnam national football team head-to-head record
- Vietnam women's national football team results
