= Egypt national football team all-time record =

The lists shown below shows the Egypt national football team all-time record against opposing nations. The statistics are composed of all men's A matches only. Olympic games are not included.

== All-time records ==
The following table shows Egypt's all-time international record, correct as of 4 October 2026.

Against	Pld	Won	Drawn	Lost	GF	GA	GD	Last Played	Best Result	Notes
Algeria	27	7	9	9	32	30	+2	16 October 2023	Egypt 4 – 0 Algeria (Angola; 28 January 2010)	
Angola	9	4	5	0	11	7	+4	25 September 2026	Egypt 2 – 1 Angola (Ghana; 4 February 2008) (South Africa; 15 January 1996)	
Argentina	2	0	0	2	2	5	−3	7 July 2026	Egypt 0 – 2 Argentina (Egypt; 26 March 2008)	
Australia	3	1	2	0	4	1	+3	3 July 2026	Egypt 3 – 0 Australia (Egypt; 18 November 2010)	1 PSO win for Australia
Austria	3	1	1	1	2	3	-1	28 February 1990	UAR 1 – 0 Austria (Egypt; 5 January 1962)	
Bahrain	1	1	0	0	1	0	+1	15 December 2003	Bahrain 0 – 1 Egypt (Bahrain; 15 December 2003)	
Belarus	1	1	0	0	2	0	+2	5 January 1997	Egypt 2 – 0 Belarus (Egypt; 5 January 1997)	
Belgium	5	3	1	1	8	5	+3	14 June 2026	Egypt 4 – 0 Belgium (Egypt; 9 February 2005)	
Benin	5	4	1	0	17	6	+11	5 January 2026	Egypt 5 – 1 Benin (Egypt; 19 November 2008)	
Bolivia	1	0	1	0	2	2	0	25 July 1999	Bolivia 2 – 2 Egypt (Mexico; 25 July 1999)	
Bosnia and Herzegovina	1	1	0	0	2	0	+2	5 March 2014	Egypt 2 – 0 Bosnia and Herzegovina (Austria; 5 March 2014)	
Botswana	7	5	2	0	11	1	+10	19 November 2024	Egypt 4 – 0 Botswana (Botswana; 10 September 2024)	
Brazil	7	0	0	7	5	20	−15	6 June 2026	Brazil 4 – 3 Egypt (South Africa; 15 June 2009)	
Bulgaria	10	5	2	3	9	6	+3	29 November 2004	Egypt 3 – 1 Bulgaria (Hong Kong; 16 February 1999)	
Burkina Faso	8	5	3	0	20	17	+3	9 September 2025	Egypt 4 – 2 Burkina Faso (Nigeria; 1 February 2000) (Nigeria; 12 January 1973)	1 PSO win for Egypt
Burundi	6	4	2	0	12	1	+11	11 January 2001	Egypt 4 – 1 Burundi (Egypt; 2 September 2006) Egypt 3 – 0 Burundi (Egypt; 11 January 2011) (Burundi; 14 September 1976)	
Cameroon	28	14	8	6	34	22	+12	3 February 2022	Egypt 4 – 0 Cameroon (Egypt; 29 May 1983)	3 PSO wins for Egypt
Cape Verde	4	1	3	0	7	4	+3	17 November 2025	Egypt 3 – 0 Cape Verde	
Canada	2	2	0	0	4	0	+4	24 April 2001	Egypt 3 – 0 Canada (Egypt; 24 April 2001)	
Central African Republic	2	0	1	1	3	4	-1	30 June 2012	Central African Republic 1 – 1 Egypt (Central African Republic; 30 June 2012)	
Chad	6	4	1	1	18	3	+15	17 November 2015	Egypt 5 – 1 Chad (Egypt; 12 July 1991) Egypt 4 – 0 Chad (Egypt; 31 March 2012) Egypt 4 – 0 Chad (Egypt; 17 November 2015)	
Chile	3	1	0	2	5	5	0	30 May 2014	Egypt 2 – 0 Chile (Egypt; 3 June 1989)	
China	2	1	1	0	2	0	+2	17 January 2001	(Egypt) UAR 2 – 0 China (Indonesia; 30 April 1963)	1 PSO win for Egypt
Colombia	2	0	2	0	1	1	0	26 May 1990	Egypt 1 – 1 Colombia (Egypt; 30 May 1990)	
Comoros	2	1	1	0	4	0	+4	29 March 2021	Egypt 4 – 0 Comoros (Egypt; 29 March 2021)	
Congo	8	7	0	1	17	5	+12	8 October 2017	Egypt 4 – 0 Congo (Egypt; 11 March 1974)	
Croatia	2	0	1	1	4	5	–1	26 March 2024	Croatia 2 – 2 Egypt (South Korea; 13 June 1999)	
Czech Republic	3	2	0	1	4	2	+2	4 January 1992	Egypt 2 – 0 Czech Republic (Egypt; 4 January 1992)	
Denmark	3	0	1	2	2	7	−5	12 February 2003	Egypt 0 – 0 Denmark (Egypt; 14 February 1990)	
Djibouti	4	4	0	0	17	0	+17	8 October 2025	Egypt 4 – 0 Djibouti (Egypt; 12 October 2008) (Djibouti; 6 June 2008)	
DR Congo	11	6	4	1	22	11	+11	28 January 2024	Egypt 6 – 3 DR Congo (Egypt; August 2010) Egypt 4 – 1 DR Congo (Egypt; 4 February 2006)	
England	3	0	0	3	1	8	−7	3 March 2010	England 1 – 0 Egypt (Italy; 21 June 1990)	
Estonia	2	0	2	0	5	5	0	19 March 2001	Egypt 3 – 3 Estonia (Egypt; 19 March 2001)	
Ethiopia	19	14	2	3	52	13	+39	6 September 2025	Egypt 8 – 1 Ethiopia (Egypt; 7 July 1997)	
Finland	2	2	0	0	4	2	+2	13 January 1989	Egypt 2 – 1 Finland (Egypt; 13 January 1989) (Egypt; 11 January 1989)	
France	1	0	0	1	0	5	−5	30 April 2003	France 5 – 0 Egypt (France; 30 April 2003)	
North Macedonia	1	0	1	0	2	2	0	29 September 1998	Macedonia 2 – 2 Egypt (Macedonia; 29 September 1998)	
Gabon	5	4	1	0	13	2	+11	16 November 2021	Egypt 4 – 0 Gabon (Egypt; 5 January 2000) (Tunisia; 28 March 1994)	
Georgia	1	0	1	0	0	0	0	14 November 2012	Georgia 0 – 0 Egypt (Georgia; 14 November 2012)	
Germany	1	1	0	0	2	1	+1	28 December 1958	Egypt 2 – 1 Germany (Egypt; 28 December 1958)	
Ghana	21	10	6	5	29	20	+9	18 January 2024	Egypt 2 – 0 Ghana (Egypt; 4 January 2002) (Egypt; 17 June 2000) (South Korea; 16 June 1997) (Egypt; 23 August 1994) (Egypt; 13 November 2016)	
Greece	9	3	1	5	12	18	−6	27 March 2018	Egypt 3 – 1 Greece (Egypt; 19 June 1936) Egypt 2 – 0 Greece (Egypt; 17 February 1950)	
Guinea	11	6	3	2	24	19	+5	14 June 2023	(Egypt) UAR 4 – 1 Guinea (Sudan; 7 February 1970)	
Guinea-Bissau	3	2	1	0	3	1	+2	12 October 2025	Guinea-Bissau 0 – 1 Egypt (Cameroon; 15 January 2022)	
Hungary	4	1	1	3	2	9	−7	17 February 1961	Egypt 3 – 0 Hungary (Paris; 29 May, 1924)	
Indonesia	3	2	1	0	11	3	+8	11 June 1991	Indonesia 0 – 6 Egypt (South Korea; 11 June 1991)	
Iran	2	0	2	0	2	2	0	26 June 2026	Iran 1–1 (8–9 PSO) Egypt (Iran; 7 June 2000)	1 PSO win for Egypt
Iraq	7	4	3	0	7	1	+6	17 April 2012	Iraq 1 – 3 Egypt (Iraq; 14 January 1972)	
Italy	3	1	0	2	3	7	−4	18 June 2009	Egypt 1 – 0 Italy (South Africa; 18 June 2009)	
Ivory Coast	23	11	6	6	31	25	+6	10 January 2026	Ivory Coast 1 – 4 Egypt (Ghana; 7 February 2008)	
Jamaica	1	0	1	0	2	2	0	4 June 2014	Egypt 2 – 2 Jamaica (England; 4 June 2014)	
Japan	2	0	0	2	1	5	−4	17 October 2007	Japan 1 – 0 Egypt (Japan; 28 October 1998)	
Jordan	5	3	0	2	10	5	+5	9 December 2025	Egypt 5 – 0 Jordan (Syria; 2 October 1974)	
Kenya	19	13	5	1	36	11	+25	25 March 2021	Egypt 5 – 0 Kenya (Qatar; 27 February 2012)	
North Korea	1	1	0	0	1	0	+1	23 January 2001	Egypt 1 – 0 North Korea (Egypt; 23 January 2001)	
South Korea	17	5	6	6	21	19	+2	14 June 2022	(Egypt) UAR 10 – 0 South Korea (Japan; 16 October 1964)	2 PSO wins for Korea Republic
Kuwait	12	4	7	1	15	11	+4	2 December 2025	(Egypt) UAR 8 – 0 Kuwait (Morocco; 4 September 1961)	
Laos	1	1	0	0	15	0	+15	16 November 2018	Laos 0 - 15 Egypt (Indonesia; 15 November 1963)	
Lebanon	7	6	1	0	16	2	+14	1 December 2021	Lebanon 1 – 4 Egypt (Libya; 11 May 2012) Egypt 3 – 0 Lebanon (Jordan; 15 July 1988) (Egypt; 28 August 1965)	
Liberia	7	5	0	2	13	2	+11	27 September 2022	Egypt 5 – 0 Liberia (Egypt; 17 August 1997)	
Libya	17	11	3	3	36	13	+23	11 October 2021	Egypt 10 – 2 Libya (Egypt; 6 August 1953)	
Lithuania	1	1	0	0	10	0	+10	1 June 1924	Egypt 10 – 0 Lithuania (France; 1 June 1924)	
Luxembourg	1	0	1	0	1	1	0	28 June 1928	Luxembourg 1-1 Egypt (Luxembourg; 28 June 1928)	
Madagascar	4	2	0	2	7	2	+5	20 June 2003	Egypt 6 – 0 Madagascar (Egypt; 20 June 2003)	1 PSO win for Egypt
Malawi	11	6	2	3	18	7	+11	28 March 2023	Egypt 4 – 0 Malawi (Malawi; 28 March 2023)	
Mali	10	4	2	4	8	8	0	17 January 2017	Egypt 2 – 1 Mali (Egypt; 9 April 1993)	
Malta	2	2	0	0	8	2	+5	5 November 1993	Egypt 5 – 2 Malta (South Korea; 9 June 1991)	
Mauritania	5	4	1	0	10	1	+9	15 October 2024	Egypt 3 – 0 Mauritania (Egypt; 25 March 2007) (United Arab Emirates; 15 April 2012)	
Mauritius	5	5	0	0	18	2	+16	2 October 2009	Egypt 7 – 0 Mauritius (Egypt; 8 June 2003)	
Mexico	3	0	1	2	2	7	−5	27 July 1999	Mexico 2 – 2 Egypt (Mexico; 27 July 1999)	
Morocco	28	4	11	13	16	31	−15	30 January 2022	Egypt 1 – 0 Morocco (Egypt; 17 March 1986) UAR 3 – 2 Morocco (Egypt; 21 March 1971)	
Mozambique	6	5	1	0	11	2	+9	14 January 2024	Egypt 2 – 0 Mozambique (Egypt; 1 June 2012) (Angola; 16 January 2010) (Burkina Faso; 10 February 1998) (Egypt; 13 March 1986)	
Namibia	6	5	1	0	23	6	+17	5 January 2008	Egypt 8 – 2 Namibia (Egypt; 13 July 2001)	
Netherlands	3	1	2	0	4	3	+1	12 June 1990	Netherlands 1 – 2 Egypt (Netherlands; 14 June 1928)	
New Zealand	4	3	1	0	6	2	+3	21 June 2026	New Zealand 1 – 3 Egypt (Vancouver; 21 June 2026)	
Niger	6	4	1	1	14	2	+12	23 September 2022	Egypt 6 – 0 Niger (Alexandria; 8 September 2018)	
Nigeria	22	7	7	8	27	30	−3	16 January 2026	(Egypt) UAR 6 – 3 Nigeria (Nigeria; 24 November 1963)	1 PSO win for Nigeria
Norway	4	0	3	1	2	5	−3	18 November 1998	Egypt 1 – 1 Norway (Egypt; 18 November 1998) (Egypt; 24 December 1948)	
Oman	2	1	1	0	2	1	+1	15 August 2012	Oman 0 – 1 Egypt (Oman; 30 May 2009)	
Poland	2	1	1	0	4	0	+4	5 December 1991	Egypt 4 – 0 Poland (Egypt; 3 December 1991)	
Portugal	5	1	0	4	4	11	−7	4 June 1928	Portugal 1 – 2 Egypt (Netherlands; 4 June 1928)	
Qatar	8	4	2	2	18	7	+11	18 December 2021	Egypt 6 – 0 Qatar (Egypt; 19 March 2003)	1 PSO win for Qatar
Republic of Ireland	1	0	1	0	0	0	0	17 June 1990	Republic of Ireland 0 – 0 Egypt (Italy; 17 June 1990)	
Romania	6	1	2	3	7	9	−2	24 December 1991	Egypt 3 – 1 Romania (Egypt; 21 December 1991)	
Russia	2	1	0	1	2	3	-1	28 May 2026	Egypt 1 - 0 Russia (Egypt; 28 May 2026)	
Rwanda	3	3	0	0	9	1	+8	5 September 2009	Egypt 3 – 0 Rwanda (Egypt; 5 July 2009)	
Saudi Arabia	8	5	1	2	24	9	+15	27 March 2026	(United Arab Republic) UAR 13 – 0 Saudi Arabia (Morocco; 3 September 1961)	
Scotland	1	1	0	0	3	1	+2	16 May 1990	Scotland 1 – 3 Egypt (Scotland; 16 May 1990)	
Senegal	16	7	2	7	9	8	+1	14 January 2026	Egypt 2 – 0 Senegal (Egypt; 13 July 1997)	2 PSO win for Senegal
Sierra Leone	4	2	1	1	5	3	+2	25 March 2025	Egypt 1 – 0 Sierra Leone (Egypt; 25 March 2025)	
Slovakia	4	3	0	1	5	2	+3	4 February 1994	Egypt 1 – 0 Slovakia (United Arab Emirates; 4 February 1994)	
Somalia	1	1	0	0	4	2	+2	24 November 1972	Egypt 4 – 2 Somalia (Egypt; 24 November 1972 )	
South Africa	14	5	1	8	9	11	-2	4 October 2026	South Africa 0 – 2 Egypt (Burkina Faso; 28 February 1998)	
South Sudan	2	2	0	0	8	0	+8	29 September 2026	South Sudan 0 – 5 Egypt (South Sudan; 29 September 2026)	
Spain	2	0	1	1	0	2	−2	31 March 2026	Spain 0 – 0 Egypt (Spain; 31 March 2026)	
Sudan	18	14	2	2	43	16	+27	19 January 2022	Egypt 6 – 1 Sudan (Egypt; 5 June 2005)	
Swaziland	3	3	0	0	16	1	+15	16 October 2018	Egypt 10 – 0 Swaziland (Egypt; 22 March 2013)	
Sweden	4	2	0	2	3	10	−7	7 February 2007	Egypt 2 – 0 Sweden (Egypt; 7 February 2007)	
Switzerland	1	0	0	1	1	3	−2	14 December 1998	Egypt 1 – 3 Switzerland (Egypt; 14 December 1998)	
Syria	7	4	1	2	18	6	+12	31 March 1995	Egypt 8 – 0 Syria (Egypt; 12 October 1951)	1 PSO win for Syria
Tanzania	13	12	1	0	43	10	+33	7 January 2024	Egypt 6 – 0 Tanzania (Egypt; 17 April 1986)	
Thailand	1	0	1	0	1	1	0	25 January 1998	Thailand 1 – 1 Egypt (Thailand; 25 January 1998)	
Togo	10	8	1	1	26	6	+20	17 November 2020	Egypt 7 – 2 Togo (Egypt; 18 December 1997)	
Trinidad and Tobago	1	1	0	0	2	1	+1	31 March 2004	Egypt 2 – 1 Trinidad and Tobago (Egypt; 31 March 2004)	
Tunisia	37	13	8	16	38	42	–4	12 September 2023	Tunisia 0 – 4 Egypt (Tunisia; 7 November 1989)	
Turkey	6	2	0	4	10	13	–3	12 May 1949	Turkey 1 – 7 Egypt (France; 1 June 1924)	
Uganda	21	17	2	2	41	13	+28	30 June 2019	Egypt 6 – 0 Uganda (Egypt; 30 July 1995)	
United Arab Emirates	6	3	3	0	6	3	+4	6 December 2025	(United Arab Emirates) UAE 1 – 2 Egypt (UAE; 16 December 2002) (Egypt; 6 January 2001)	1 PSO win for Egypt
Uruguay	2	0	0	2	0	3	−3	15 June 2018	Egypt 0 – 1 Uruguay (Russia; 15 June 2018)	
United States	2	1	0	1	3	4	−1	21 June 2009	Egypt 3 – 1 United States (South Korea; 8 June 1987)	
Uzbekistan	1	0	0	1	0	2	−2	14 November 2025	Egypt 0 – 2 Uzbekistan (Uzbekistan; 14 November 2025)	
Vietnam	1	1	0	0	4	1	+3	1 November 1963	Egypt 4 – 1 North Vietnam (Indonesia; 1 November 1963)	
Yugoslavia	9	0	4	5	5	18	−13	14 June 1997	Yugoslavia 0 – 0 Egypt (South Korea; 14 June 1997)	
Zambia	18	11	4	3	30	16	+14	12 October 2023	Zambia 0 – 4 Egypt (Burkina Faso; 13 February 1998)	
Zimbabwe	14	9	4	1	23	12	+11	22 December 2025	Zimbabwe 2 – 4 Egypt (Zimbabwe;9 June 2013) Egypt 2 – 0 Zimbabwe (Egypt; 5 January 2006) (Egypt; 24 May 2004)	
Total	839	415	193	228	1337	870	+467	4 October 2026	Laos 0 – 15 Egypt (Indonesia; 15 November 1963)	
