= Phan Văn Santos =

Vietnamese footballer (born 1977)

Fábio dos Santos Phan Văn Santos
Personal information
- Full name: Fábio dos Santos
- Date of birth: 30 September 1977 (age 49)
- Place of birth: Rio de Janeiro, Brazil
- Height: 1.98 m (6 ft 6 in)
- Position: Goalkeeper

Youth career
- 1992–1996: Vasco da Gama

Senior career*
Years	Team	Apps	(Gls)
1997–1999	Vasco da Gama	2	(0)
1999	Barreira	5	(0)
2000	Campo Grande	8	(0)
2001–2010	Đồng Tâm Long An	206	(22)
2010	→ Navibank Sài Gòn (loan)	10	(0)
2011–2012	Navibank Sài Gòn	18	(0)
2012–2013	Becamex Bình Dương	6	(0)
2013–2014	Hùng Vương An Giang	4	(0)

International career
2008	Vietnam	2	(0)
- * Club domestic league appearances and goals

Phan Văn Santos (born Fábio dos Santos on 30 September 1977) is a retired footballer who played as a goalkeeper and currently an amateur coach and a football instructor for children in Ho Chi Minh City. Born in Brazil, he represented Vietnam internationally.

== Club career ==
Before moving to Vietnam, Phan Van Santos played for the youth team of De Regatas Vasco da Gama. The first club he joined in Vietnam was Dong Tam Long An. t the end of 2007, he became the first naturalized foreign player in Vietnam.

After becoming a Vietnamese citizen in late 2007 under the name Phan Van Santos, more than half a year later, he was called up to the Vietnam national team by coach Henrique Calisto to prepare for the 2008 AFF Cup.

In 2010, Santos moved to join Navibank Sai Gon FC. A failure to control his weight prevented Santos from staying long at Thong Nhat Stadium. In 2012, he moved to Becamex Binh Duong after Navibank Sai Gon was disbanded.

In 2013, Santos did not have his contract renewed by Becamex Binh Duong, so he went to play for the V.League newcomer Hung Vuong An Giang.

Upon retiring, he remained in Vietnam, working various jobs, and currently teaches football at an international school in Ho Chi Minh City.

== International career ==
He played for Vietnam in the match against Brazil's Olympic team in August 2008.

== See also ==
- List of goalscoring goalkeepers
- List of Vietnam international footballers born outside Vietnam
