= Lê Thế Thọ =

Vietnamese footballer

Personal information
- Date of birth: 22 December 1941 (age 84)
- Place of birth: Hải Dương, French Indochina
- Position: Midfielder

Senior career*
Years	Team	Apps	(Gls)
1959–1970	Trường Huấn Luyện Thể Thao Trung Uơng		

International career
1960–1970	North Vietnam		
- * Club domestic league appearances and goals

Lê Thế Thọ (born 22 December 1941) is a Vietnamese former footballer who played as a midfielder. He was the General Secretary of the Vietnam Football Federation from 1989 to 1993.

Thế Thọ played for the North Vietnam national football team and was regarded as one of the best Vietnamese midfielders during the 1960s.
