= Từ Như Thành =

Vietnamese footballer (born 1943)

Personal information
- Full name: Từ Như Thành
- Date of birth: 1943 (age 82–83)
- Place of birth: Nouméa, New Caledonia
- Height: 1.70 m (5 ft 7 in)
- Position: Defender

Senior career*
Years	Team	Apps	(Gls)
1964–????	Công An Hà Nội		

International career
1960s	North Vietnam		
- * Club domestic league appearances and goals

Từ Như Thành (born 1943) is a former footballer who played as a defender. Born in New Caledonia, he represented the North Vietnam national team.

== Early life and career ==
Born in New Caledonia to Vietnamese parents, Thành started playing football in New Caledonia. In late 1963, he and his family repatriated to North Vietnam through the Hai Phong Port. In early 1964, he and his brother, Từ Như Hiển, joined Công An Hà Nội, where he was known as "Thành C" due to two other players also having the same name.

== Style of play ==
Thành was considered a logical and effective defender, who despite being slow, was extremely skillful at getting the ball from forwards. This style, which was seen as less physically demanding, allowed him to maintain high levels of energy late into matches.

He has also been compared to England international defender Rio Ferdinand.

== Personal life ==
Thành had five siblings, although one of them died in the Vietnam War. Three of them, Từ Như Hiển, Từ Như Sơn, and Từ Như Quang, were all footballers, while another, Từ Như Hà, was a volleyball player.

Following his retirement, Thành moved abroad.
