= Nan Hu =

Chinese physician-scientist, molecular geneticist, and cancer epidemiologist

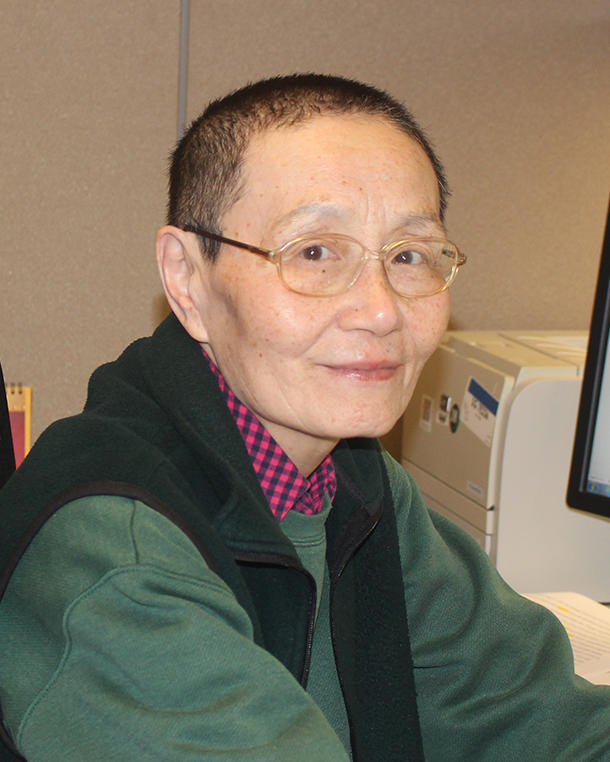
- Hu in 2018
- Education: Shanxi Medical University; Beijing Medical College; Peking Union Medical College; George Washington University
- Scientific career
- Fields: Molecular genetics, cancer epidemiology, gastrointestinal cancers
- Workplaces: National Cancer Institute

Nan Hu is a Chinese physician-scientist, molecular geneticist, and cancer epidemiologist who researches gastrointestinal cancers. She is a staff scientist in the metabolic epidemiology branch at the National Cancer Institute.

== Life ==
Hu received a medical degree from the Shanxi Medical College in 1976, followed by a master’s degree in cytogenetics and medical genetics from the Beijing Medical College in 1982. After completing a doctorate in cancer genetics from the Peking Union Medical College in 1987 under the mentorship of Wu Min, she served as a postdoctoral fellow with Janet Rowley at the University of Chicago from 1987 to 1989. Hu went on to work at the National Cancer Institute (NCI)—first as a visiting associate from 1990 to 1991, and then as a postdoctoral fellow with Dean Hamer from 1992 to 1994. Under Hamer, she researched genetic theories of homosexuality. She joined the NCI cancer prevention fellowship program in 1994, earning an M.P.H. in epidemiology and biostatistics from the George Washington University in the process.

Hu joined the NCI division of cancer epidemiology and cancer genetics (DCEG) as a staff scientist in 1998. She works in its metabolic epidemiology branch (MEB). Hu conducts molecular genetics bench work, epidemiologic field studies, and statistical analysis to research the etiology, prevention, and early detection of upper gastrointestinal cancers.
