= Vietnam national football team results (2010–2019) =

National football team results from 2010s

This article provides details of football games played by the Vietnam national football team from the 2010s.

== Results ==
Key
Win
Draw
Defeat

=== 2010 ===
6 January Asian Cup qualifier	Lebanon	1–1	Vietnam	Sidon, Lebanon
14:15	El Ali 20'	Report	Phạm Thành Lương 40'	Stadium: Saida Municipal Stadium; Attendance: 50; Referee: Kovalenko Valentin (Uzbekistan)

17 January Asian Cup qualifier	Vietnam	1–2	China	Hanoi, Vietnam
19:00	Lê Công Vinh 76' (pen.)	Report	Yang Xu 35'; Zhang Linpeng 43'	Stadium: Mỹ Đình National Stadium; Attendance: 3,000; Referee: Malik Abdul Bashir (Singapore)

24 September Millennial Anniversary of Hanoi Cup	Vietnam	0–0	North Korea	Hanoi, Vietnam
19:00		Report		Stadium: Mỹ Đình National Stadium; Attendance: 40,000

8 October Friendly	India	3–1	Vietnam	Pune, India
19:00	Chhetri 25', 48', 72'	Report	Vũ Như Thành 62' (pen.)	Stadium: Balewadi Sports Complex; Referee: Dinesh Nair (India)

12 October Friendly	Kuwait	3–1	Vietnam	Kuwait City, Kuwait
19:00	Ajab 68'; Nasser 79', 89'	Report	Nguyễn Minh Phương 58'	Stadium: Jaber Al-Ahmad International Stadium

4 November VFF Cup	Singapore	1–1	Vietnam	Hanoi, Vietnam
19:00	Shi Jiayi 25'	Report	Phan Văn Tài Em 76'	Stadium: Mỹ Đình National Stadium

6 November VFF Cup	Vietnam	0–2	North Korea	Hanoi, Vietnam
19:00		Report	An Il-bom 56'; Ri Jin-hyok 68'	Stadium: Mỹ Đình National Stadium

2 December AFF Cup GS	Vietnam	7–1	Myanmar	Hanoi, Vietnam
19:30	Nguyễn Anh Đức 13', 56'; Nguyễn Minh Phương 30'; Lê Tấn Tài 51'; Nguyễn Trọng Hoàng 73', 83'; Nguyễn Vũ Phong 90+4'	Report	Aung Kyaw Moe 16'	Stadium: Mỹ Đình National Stadium; Attendance: 40,000; Referee: Pratap Singh (India)

5 December AFF Cup GS	Philippines	2–0	Vietnam	Hanoi, Vietnam
19:30	C. Greatwich 38'; P. Younghusband 79'	Report		Stadium: Mỹ Đình National Stadium; Attendance: 40,000; Referee: Jimmy Napitupulu (Indonesia)

8 December AFF Cup GS	Vietnam	1–0	Singapore	Hanoi, Vietnam
19:30	Nguyễn Vũ Phong 32'	Report		Stadium: Mỹ Đình National Stadium; Attendance: 40,000; Referee: Chaiya Mahapab (Thailand)

15 December AFF Cup SF	Malaysia	2–0	Vietnam	Kuala Lumpur, Malaysia
20:00	Safee 60', 79'	Report		Stadium: Bukit Jalil National Stadium; Attendance: 45,000; Referee: Sun Baojie (China PR)

18 December AFF Cup SF	Vietnam	0–0 (0–2 agg.)	Malaysia	Hanoi, Vietnam
19:00		Report		Stadium: Mỹ Đình National Stadium; Attendance: 40,000; Referee: Kim Sang-Woo (Korea Republic)

=== 2011 ===
29 June World Cup qualifier R1	Vietnam	6–0	Macau	Ho Chi Minh City, Vietnam
19:15	Lê Công Vinh 20', 36', 42' (pen.); Phạm Thành Lương 62'; Nguyễn Ngọc Thanh 67'; Nguyễn Văn Quyết 89'	Report		Stadium: Thống Nhất Stadium; Attendance: 20,000; Referee: Dmitry Mashentsev (Kyrgyzstan)

3 July World Cup qualifier R1	Macau	1–7 (1–13 agg.)	Vietnam	Taipa, Macau
19:15	Leong Ka Hang 59'	Report	Huỳnh Quang Thanh 2', 86'; Nguyễn Quang Hải 23'; Lê Công Vinh 29', 42', 74', 82'	Stadium: Estádio Campo Desportivo; Attendance: 500; Referee: Kadhum Auda (Iraq)

23 July World Cup qualifier R2	Qatar	3–0	Vietnam	Doha, Qatar
19:15	Kasola 6'; Mubarak 51'; Ahmed 67'	Report		Stadium: Khalifa International Stadium; Attendance: 26,786; Referee: Ali Al Badwawi (United Arab Emirates)

28 July World Cup qualifier R2	Vietnam	2–1 (2–4 agg.)	Qatar	Hanoi, Vietnam
19:15	Nguyễn Trọng Hoàng 60'; Nguyễn Quang Hải 75'	Report	Ahmed 17'	Stadium: Mỹ Đình National Stadium; Attendance: 20,000; Referee: Peter Green (Australia)

7 October Friendly	Japan	1–0	Vietnam	Kobe, Japan
16:00	Lee 25'	Report		Stadium: Home's Stadium Kobe

=== 2012 ===
8 June Friendly	China	3–0	Vietnam	Wuhan, China
20:00	Gao Lin 9', 64'; Feng Renliang 35'	Report		Stadium: Wuhan Sports Center Stadium; Attendance: 30,000; Referee: Ko Hyung-Jin (South Korea)

10 June Friendly	Hong Kong	1–2	Vietnam	Mong Kok, Hong Kong
17:30	Au Yeung Yiu Chung 41'	Report	Nguyễn Văn Quyết 71'; Nguyễn Trọng Hoàng 74'	Stadium: Mong Kok Stadium; Attendance: 4,000; Referee: Muhammad Taqi Al-Jaafari (Singapore)

23 June Friendly	Vietnam	1–0	Mozambique	Ho Chi Minh City, Vietnam
17:00	Phạm Thành Lương 63'	Report		Stadium: Thống Nhất Stadium; Attendance: 15,000; Referee: Teetichai Nualjan (Thailand)

11 September Friendly	Malaysia	0–2	Vietnam	Shah Alam, Malaysia
19:45		Report	Lê Công Vinh 32'; Phan Thanh Hưng 48'	Stadium: Shah Alam Stadium; Attendance: 15,000; Referee: Mat Karim (Malaysia)

15 September Friendly	Indonesia	0–0	Vietnam	Surabaya, Indonesia
15:30		Report		Stadium: Gelora Bung Tomo Stadium; Attendance: 25,000; Referee: Rosy Faulur (Indonesia)

16 October Friendly	Vietnam	0–0	Indonesia	Hanoi, Vietnam
19:00		Report		Stadium: Mỹ Đình National Stadium; Attendance: 30,000; Referee: Phùng Đình Dũng (Vietnam)

19 October Friendly	Vietnam	Cancelled	India	Hanoi, Vietnam
		Report		Stadium: Mỹ Đình National Stadium
Note: The match was cancelled because both teams failed to reach a mutual agreement.

24 October VFF Cup	Vietnam	0–1	Turkmenistan	Ho Chi Minh City, Vietnam
19:00		Report	Baýramow 57'	Stadium: Thống Nhất Stadium; Attendance: 20,000; Referee: Mat Karim (Malaysia)

26 October VFF Cup	Laos	0–4	Vietnam	Ho Chi Minh City, Vietnam
19:00		Report	Nguyễn Quang Hải 17', 36' (pen.); Nguyễn Trọng Hoàng 77'; Huỳnh Quốc Anh 80'	Stadium: Thống Nhất Stadium; Attendance: 5,000

3 November Friendly	Vietnam	1–0	Malaysia	Hanoi, Vietnam
19:00	Nguyễn Trọng Hoàng 74'	Report		Stadium: Mỹ Đình National Stadium; Attendance: 10,000; Referee: Prathan Nasa Wang (Thailand)

24 November AFF Cup GS	Vietnam	1–1	Myanmar	Bangkok, Thailand
17:30	Lê Tấn Tài 35'	Report	Kyi Lin 54' (pen.)	Stadium: Rajamangala Stadium; Attendance: 500; Referee: Andre El Haddad (Lebanon)

27 November AFF Cup GS	Vietnam	0–1	Philippines	Bangkok, Thailand
17:30		Report	Caligdong 85'	Stadium: Rajamangala Stadium; Referee: Ma Ning (China PR)

30 November AFF Cup GS	Thailand	3–1	Vietnam	Bangkok, Thailand
20:20	Kirati 21', 65'; Nguyễn Gia Từ 82' (o.g.)	Report	Nguyễn Văn Quyết 72'	Stadium: Rajamangala Stadium; Referee: Ryuji Sato (Japan)

=== 2013 ===
6 February Asian Cup qualifier	Vietnam	1–2	United Arab Emirates	Hanoi, Vietnam
18:00	Huỳnh Quốc Anh 60'	Report	Khalil 8'; Fardan 67'	Stadium: Mỹ Đình National Stadium; Attendance: 7,200; Referee: Strebre Delovski (Australia)

22 March Asian Cup qualifier	Hong Kong	1–0	Vietnam	Mong Kok, Hong Kong
20:00	Chan Wai Ho 87'	Report		Stadium: Mong Kok Stadium; Attendance: 6,639; Referee: Abdulrahman Abdou (Qatar)

9 October Friendly	Qatar	1–2	Vietnam	Doha, Qatar
19:30	Jeddo 14'	Report	Nguyễn Trọng Hoàng 20', 30'	Stadium: Jassim Bin Hamad Stadium

15 October Asian Cup qualifier	Uzbekistan	3–1	Vietnam	Tashkent, Uzbekistan
17:00	Rashidov 69'; Âu Văn Hoàn 74' (o.g.); Sergeev 90+2'	Report	Nguyễn Trọng Hoàng 77'	Stadium: Pakhtakor Markaziy Stadium; Attendance: 5,675; Referee: Mohsen Torky (Iran)

15 November Asian Cup qualifier	Vietnam	0–3	Uzbekistan	Hanoi, Vietnam
19:00		Report	Shodiev 40'; Sergeev 47'; Rashidov 89'	Stadium: Mỹ Đình National Stadium; Attendance: 9,000; Referee: Kim Jong-Hyeok (South Korea)

19 November Asian Cup qualifier	United Arab Emirates	5–0	Vietnam	Abu Dhabi, United Arab Emirates
19:00	Abbas 19'; Matar 25'; Mabkhout 31'; Fardan 37'; Khalil 90+2'	Report		Stadium: Sheikh Zayed Stadium; Attendance: 9,674; Referee: Ryuji Sato (Japan)

=== 2014 ===
5 March Asian Cup qualifier	Vietnam	3–1	Hong Kong	Hanoi, Vietnam
21:00	Huỳnh Quốc Anh 24'; Nguyễn Anh Đức 68'; Nguyễn Trọng Hoàng 83'	Report	Lam Ka Wai 82'	Stadium: Mỹ Đình National Stadium; Attendance: 5,800; Referee: Mohd Amirul Izwan (Malaysia)

2 July Friendly	Vietnam	6–0	Myanmar	Bình Dương, Vietnam
17:00	Nguyễn Hải Anh 10', 15'; Lê Công Vinh 20', 34', 52'; Nguyễn Văn Quyết 86'	Report		Stadium: Gò Đậu Stadium; Referee: Chaiya Mahapab (Thailand)

3 September Friendly	Vietnam	Cancelled	North Korea	Haiphong, Vietnam
		Report		Stadium: Lạch Tray Stadium
Note: North Korea withdrew from the game due to conflicting schedules with their national football league games.

6 September Friendly	Vietnam	3–1	Hong Kong	Haiphong, Vietnam
17:00	Nguyễn Hải Anh 3', 48'; Lê Công Vinh 62'	Report	Chan Wai Ho 58' (pen.)	Stadium: Lạch Tray Stadium; Referee: Sivakorn Pu-Udom (Thailand)

9 November Friendly	Vietnam	1–3	Palestine	Hanoi, Vietnam
17:00	Nguyễn Văn Quyết 89'	Report	Abuhabib 56'; Salhe 71'; Eid 83'	Stadium: Mỹ Đình National Stadium; Referee: Foo Chuan Hui (Singapore)

16 November Friendly	Vietnam	3–1	Malaysia	Hanoi, Vietnam
17:00	Mạc Hồng Quân 46'; Nguyễn Văn Quyết 56' (pen.); Ngô Hoàng Thịnh 80'	Report	Amri 22'	Stadium: Mỹ Đình National Stadium; Referee: Foo Chuan Hui (Singapore)

22 November AFF Cup GS	Vietnam	2–2	Indonesia	Hanoi, Vietnam
19:00	Quế Ngọc Hải 11'; Lê Công Vinh 68'	Report	Zulham 33'; Samsul 84'	Stadium: Mỹ Đình National Stadium; Referee: Minoru Tōjō (Japan)

25 November AFF Cup GS	Laos	0–3	Vietnam	Hanoi, Vietnam
19:00		Report	Vũ Minh Tuấn 27'; Lê Công Vinh 84'; Nguyễn Huy Hùng 88'	Stadium: Mỹ Đình National Stadium; Referee: Ali Sabah Al-Qaysi (Iraq)

28 November AFF Cup GS	Vietnam	3–1	Philippines	Hanoi, Vietnam
19:00	Ngô Hoàng Thịnh 9'; Vũ Minh Tuấn 50'; Phạm Thành Lương 58'	Report	Mulders 60'	Stadium: Mỹ Đình National Stadium; Referee: Minoru Tōjō (Japan)

7 December AFF Cup SF	Malaysia	1–2	Vietnam	Shah Alam, Malaysia
20:00	Safiq 14' (pen.)	Report	Võ Huy Toàn 32'; Nguyễn Văn Quyết 60'	Stadium: Shah Alam Stadium; Referee: Ma Ning (China)

11 December AFF Cup SF	Vietnam	2–4 (4–5 agg.)	Malaysia	Hanoi, Vietnam
20:00	Lê Công Vinh 20' (pen.), 80'	Report	Safiq 3' (pen.); Norshahrul 16'; Đinh Tiến Thành 29' (o.g.); Shukor 44'	Stadium: Mỹ Đình National Stadium; Referee: Masaaki Toma (Japan)

=== 2015 ===
17 May Friendly	Vietnam	1–1	North Korea	Hanoi, Vietnam
19:00 UTC+7	Mạc Hồng Quân 65'	Report	Hong Kum-song 84'	Stadium: Mỹ Đình National Stadium; Referee: Alongkorn Feemuechang (Thailand)

24 May World Cup qualifier R2	Thailand	1–0	Vietnam	Bangkok, Thailand
19:00 UTC+7	Pokklaw 81'	Report (FIFA); Report (AFC)		Stadium: Rajamangala Stadium; Attendance: 50,000; Referee: Benjamin Williams (Australia)

8 September World Cup qualifier R2	Chinese Taipei	1–2	Vietnam	Taipei, Taiwan
19:00 UTC+8	Wu Chun-ching 82'	Report (FIFA); Report (AFC)	Đinh Tiến Thành 53'; Trần Phi Sơn 90+2'	Stadium: Taipei Municipal Stadium; Attendance: 20,239; Referee: Kim Dae-yong (South Korea)

3 October Friendly	Philippines	Cancelled	Vietnam	Manila, Philppines
		Report		Stadium: Rizal Memorial Stadium
Note: Philippines decided to cancel the game due to conflflicting schedules with the 2015 Singapore Cup, where several players of their team took part.

8 October World Cup qualifier R2	Vietnam	1–1	Iraq	Hanoi, Vietnam
19:00 UTC+7	Lê Công Vinh 25'	Report (FIFA); Report (AFC)	Mahmoud 90+7'	Stadium: Mỹ Đình National Stadium; Attendance: 10,000; Referee: Chris Beath (Australia)

13 October World Cup qualifier R2	Vietnam	0–3	Thailand	Hanoi, Vietnam
19:00 UTC+7		Report (FIFA); Report (AFC)	Kroekrit 29'; Đinh Tiến Thành 56' (o.g.); Theerathon 70'	Stadium: Mỹ Đình National Stadium; Attendance: 35,000; Referee: Nawaf Shukralla (Bahrain)

12 November Friendly	Vietnam	Cancelled	Kuwait	Ho Chi Minh City, Vietnam
		Report		Stadium: Thống Nhất Stadium
Note: On 16 October 2015, Kuwait was suspended by FIFA. As the result, the match was cancelled.

=== 2016 ===
24 March World Cup qualifier R2	Vietnam	4–1	Chinese Taipei	Hanoi, Vietnam
19:00 UTC+7	Lê Công Vinh 8', 90+1'; Nguyễn Văn Toàn 29', 42'	Report (FIFA); Report (AFC)	Wu Chun-ching 7'	Stadium: Mỹ Đình National Stadium; Attendance: 18,350; Referee: Adham Makhadmeh (Jordan)

29 March World Cup qualifier R2	Iraq	1–0	Vietnam	Tehran, Iran
18:30 UTC+4:30	Abdul-Raheem 45+1'	Report (FIFA); Report (AFC)		Stadium: PAS Stadium; Attendance: 2,160; Referee: Peter Green (Australia)

31 May Friendly	Vietnam	2–0	Syria	Hanoi, Vietnam
18:00 UTC+7	Lê Công Vinh 34'; Nguyễn Văn Quyết 45+1'	Report		Stadium: Mỹ Đình National Stadium; Referee: Sukhbir Singh (Singapore)

3 June AYA Bank Cup SF	Vietnam	2–2 (4–3 p)	Hong Kong	Yangon, Myanmar
15:00 UTC+6:30	Lê Công Vinh 57', 61'		McKee 48', 77'	Stadium: Thuwunna Stadium; Attendance: 8,000; Referee: Thant Zin Oo (Myanmar)
	Penalties
	Trần Nguyên Mạnh (penalty scored); Quế Ngọc Hải (penalty scored); Lương Xuân Trường (penalty scored); Hoàng Đình Tùng (penalty missed); Nguyễn Văn Quyết (penalty scored)		(penalty missed) Itaparica; (penalty scored) Sandro; (penalty scored) Leung Kwun Chung; (penalty missed) Ngue; (penalty scored) Roberto

6 June AYA Bank Cup F	Vietnam	3–0 (a.e.t.)	Singapore	Yangon, Myanmar
18:00 UTC+6:30	Lê Công Vinh 91'; Nguyễn Văn Quyết 98'; Đinh Thanh Trung 113'			Stadium: Thuwunna Stadium; Attendance: 6,800; Referee: Khin Maung Win (Myanmar)

6 October Friendly	Vietnam	5–2	North Korea	Ho Chi Minh City, Vietnam
18:00 UTC+7	Nguyễn Tuấn Anh 33'; Lê Công Vinh 51'; Vũ Văn Thanh 63'; Lương Xuân Trường 85'; Phạm Thành Lương 90+3'		Pak Kwang-ryong 15', 53'	Stadium: Thống Nhất Stadium; Referee: Mongkolchai Pechsri (Thailand)

9 October Friendly	Indonesia	2–2	Vietnam	Sleman, Indonesia
16:45 UTC+7	Zulham 26'; Bachdim 28'	Report	Lê Văn Thắng 4'; Vũ Minh Tuấn 12'	Stadium: Maguwoharjo Stadium; Attendance: 22,167; Referee: Win Khin Maung (Myanmar)

8 November Friendly	Vietnam	3–2	Indonesia	Hanoi, Vietnam
19:00 UTC+7	Lê Công Vinh 45'; Nguyễn Công Phượng 71'; Nguyễn Văn Toàn 83'	Report	Boaz 32'; Bachdim 52' (pen.)	Stadium: Mỹ Đình National Stadium; Referee: Feemuechang Alongkron (Thailand)

20 November AFF Cup GS	Myanmar	1–2	Vietnam	Yangon, Myanmar
18:00 UTC+6:30	Aung Thu 73'	Report	Nguyễn Văn Quyết 24'; Lê Công Vinh 80'	Stadium: Thuwunna Stadium; Attendance: 28,040; Referee: Hiroyuki Kimura (Japan)

23 November AFF Cup GS	Malaysia	0–1	Vietnam	Yangon, Myanmar
15:00 UTC+6:30		Report	Nguyễn Trọng Hoàng 80'	Stadium: Thuwunna Stadium; Attendance: 2,542; Referee: Çarymyrat Kurbanow (Turkmenistan)

26 November AFF Cup GS	Vietnam	2–1	Cambodia	Naypyidaw, Myanmar
18:00 UTC+6:30	Lê Công Vinh 20'; Tola 50' (o.g.)	Report	Polroth 65'	Stadium: Wunna Theikdi Stadium; Attendance: 685; Referee: Hiroyuki Kimura (Japan)

3 December AFF Cup SF	Indonesia	2–1	Vietnam	Bogor, Indonesia
19:00 UTC+7	Hansamu 7'; Boaz 50' (pen.)	Report	Nguyễn Văn Quyết 17' (pen.)	Stadium: Pakansari Stadium; Attendance: 30,000; Referee: Jarred Gillett (Australia)

7 December AFF Cup SF	Vietnam	2–2 (a.e.t.) (3–4 agg.)	Indonesia	Hanoi, Vietnam
19:00 UTC+7	Vũ Văn Thanh 83'; Vũ Minh Tuấn 90+3'	Report	Lilipaly 54'; Lestusen 97' (pen.)	Stadium: Mỹ Đình National Stadium; Attendance: 40,000; Referee: Fu Ming (China)

=== 2017 ===
22 March Friendly	Vietnam	1–1	Chinese Taipei	Hanoi, Vietnam
18:00 UTC+7	Nguyễn Công Phượng 89'	Report	Lee Pin-hsien 84'	Stadium: Hàng Đẫy Stadium; Attendance: 23,120; Referee: Nathan Chan (Singapore)

28 March Asian Cup qualifier	Afghanistan	1–1	Vietnam	Dushanbe, Tajikistan
19:00 UTC+5	Amin 69'	Report	Nguyễn Văn Toàn 64'	Stadium: Pamir Stadium; Attendance: 2,500; Referee: Turki Al-Khudhayr (Saudi Arabia)

13 June Asian Cup qualifier	Vietnam	0–0	Jordan	Ho Chi Minh City, Vietnam
19:00 UTC+7		Report		Stadium: Thống Nhất Stadium; Attendance: 12,000; Referee: Ng Chiu Kok (Hong Kong)

5 September Asian Cup qualifier	Cambodia	1–2	Vietnam	Phnom Penh, Cambodia
18:30 UTC+7	Chan Vathanaka 10'	Report	Nguyễn Văn Quyết 5'; Nguyễn Quang Hải 81'	Stadium: Olympic Stadium; Attendance: 34,587; Referee: Minoru Tōjō (Japan)

10 October Asian Cup qualifier	Vietnam	5–0	Cambodia	Hanoi, Vietnam
19:00 UTC+7	Đinh Thanh Trung 13'; Nguyễn Văn Quyết 56'; Nguyễn Anh Đức 60'; Nguyễn Công Phượng 76'; Mạc Hồng Quân 90+2'	Report		Stadium: Mỹ Đình National Stadium; Attendance: 11,000; Referee: Sivakorn Pu-udom (Thailand)

14 November Asian Cup qualifier	Vietnam	0–0	Afghanistan	Hanoi, Vietnam
19:00 UTC+7		Report		Stadium: Mỹ Đình National Stadium; Attendance: 28,500; Referee: Jameel Abdulhusin (Bahrain)

=== 2018 ===
27 March Asian Cup qualifier	Jordan	1–1	Vietnam	Amman, Jordan
17:00 UTC+2	Abu Amarah 71'	Report	Nguyễn Anh Đức 24'	Stadium: King Abdullah II Stadium; Attendance: 1,562; Referee: Hettikamkanamge Perera (Sri Lanka)

8 November AFF Cup GS	Laos	0–3	Vietnam	Vientiane, Laos
19:30 UTC+7		Report (AFFSZ); Report (AFF)	Nguyễn Công Phượng 11'; Nguyễn Anh Đức 45+2'; Nguyễn Quang Hải 68'	Stadium: New Laos National Stadium; Attendance: 15,000; Referee: Thoriq Munir Alkatiri (Indonesia)

16 November AFF Cup GS	Vietnam	2–0	Malaysia	Hanoi, Vietnam
19:30 UTC+7	Nguyễn Công Phượng 11'; Nguyễn Anh Đức 60'	Report (AFFSZ); Report (AFF)		Stadium: Mỹ Đình National Stadium; Attendance: 40,000; Referee: Turki Al-Khudayr (Saudi Arabia)

20 November AFF Cup GS	Myanmar	0–0	Vietnam	Yangon, Myanmar
18:00 UTC+6:30		Report (AFFSZ); Report (AFF)		Stadium: Thuwunna Stadium; Attendance: 29,954; Referee: Khamis Al-Marri (Qatar)

24 November AFF Cup GS	Vietnam	3–0	Cambodia	Hanoi, Vietnam
19:30 UTC+7	Nguyễn Tiến Linh 39'; Nguyễn Quang Hải 41'; Phan Văn Đức 61'	Report (AFFSZ); Report (AFF)		Stadium: Hàng Đẫy Stadium; Attendance: 14,000; Referee: Ma Ning (China)

2 December AFF Cup SF	Philippines	1–2	Vietnam	Bacolod, Philippines
19:30 UTC+8	Reichelt 45+2'	Report (AFFSZ); Report (AFF)	Nguyễn Anh Đức 12'; Phan Văn Đức 48'	Stadium: Panaad Stadium; Attendance: 5,489; Referee: Abdulrahman Al-Jassim (Qatar)

6 December AFF Cup SF	Vietnam	2–1 (4–2 agg.)	Philippines	Hanoi, Vietnam
19:30 UTC+7	Nguyễn Quang Hải 84'; Nguyễn Công Phượng 87'	Report (AFFSZ); Report (AFF)	J. Younghusband 89'	Stadium: Mỹ Đình National Stadium; Attendance: 38,816; Referee: Hiroyuki Kimura (Japan)

11 December AFF Cup F	Malaysia	2–2	Vietnam	Kuala Lumpur, Malaysia
20:45 UTC+8	Shahrul 36'; Safawi 61'	Report (AFFSZ); Report (AFF)	Nguyễn Huy Hùng 22'; Phạm Đức Huy 25'	Stadium: Bukit Jalil National Stadium; Attendance: 88,482; Referee: Chris Beath (Australia)

15 December AFF Cup F	Vietnam	1–0 (3–2 agg.)	Malaysia	Hanoi, Vietnam
19:30 UTC+7	Nguyễn Anh Đức 6'	Report (AFFSZ); Report (AFF)		Stadium: Mỹ Đình National Stadium; Attendance: 40,000; Referee: Alireza Faghani (Iran)

25 December Friendly	Vietnam	1–1	North Korea	Hanoi, Vietnam
19:00 UTC+7	Nguyễn Tiến Linh 54'	Report	Jong Il-gwan 81'	Stadium: Mỹ Đình National Stadium; Referee: Mongkolchai Pechsri (Thailand)

31 December Friendly	Philippines	2–4	Vietnam	Doha, Qatar
18:00 UTC+3	Reed; Tanton	Report	Nguyễn Quang Hải; Phan Văn Đức; Đoàn Văn Hậu; Quế Ngọc Hải	Stadium: Grand Hamad Stadium

=== 2019 ===
8 January Asian Cup GS	Iraq	3–2	Vietnam	Abu Dhabi, United Arab Emirates
17:30 UTC+4	M. Ali 35'; Tariq 60'; Adnan 90'	Report	Faez 24' (o.g.); Nguyễn Công Phượng 42'	Stadium: Zayed Sports City Stadium; Attendance: 4,779; Referee: Abdulrahman Al-Jassim (Qatar)

12 January Asian Cup GS	Vietnam	0–2	Iran	Abu Dhabi, United Arab Emirates
15:00 UTC+4		Report	Azmoun 38', 69'	Stadium: Al Nahyan Stadium; Attendance: 10,841; Referee: Muhammad Taqi (Singapore)

16 January Asian Cup GS	Vietnam	2–0	Yemen	Al Ain, United Arab Emirates
20:00 UTC+4	Nguyễn Quang Hải 38'; Quế Ngọc Hải 64' (pen.)	Report		Stadium: Hazza bin Zayed Stadium; Attendance: 8,237; Referee: Ahmed Al-Kaf (Oman)

20 January Asian Cup R16	Jordan	1–1 (a.e.t.) (2–4 p)	Vietnam	Dubai, United Arab Emirates
15:00 UTC+4	Abdel-Rahman 39'	Report	Nguyễn Công Phượng 51'	Stadium: Al Maktoum Stadium; Attendance: 14,205; Referee: Alireza Faghani (Iran)
	Penalties
	Abdel-Rahman (penalty scored); Faisal (penalty missed); Samir (penalty missed); Ersan (penalty scored)		(penalty scored) Quế Ngọc Hải; (penalty scored) Đỗ Hùng Dũng; (penalty scored) Lương Xuân Trường; (penalty missed) Trần Minh Vương; (penalty scored) Bùi Tiến Dũng I

24 January Asian Cup QF	Vietnam	0–1	Japan	Dubai, United Arab Emirates
17:00 UTC+4		Report	Doan 57' (pen.)	Stadium: Al Maktoum Stadium; Attendance: 8,954; Referee: Mohammed Abdulla Hassan Mohamed (United Arab Emirates)

5 June King's Cup SF	Thailand	0–1	Vietnam	Buriram, Thailand
19:45 UTC+7		Report	Nguyễn Anh Đức 90+4'	Stadium: Chang Arena; Referee: Jumpei Iida (Japan)

8 June King's Cup F	Curaçao	1–1 (5–4 p)	Vietnam	Buriram, Thailand
19:45 UTC+7	Carolina 58'	Report	Phạm Đức Huy 83'	Stadium: Chang Arena; Referee: Wiwat Jumpaoon (Thailand)
	Penalties
	Benschop (penalty scored); Hooi (penalty scored); Antonia (penalty scored); Bacuna (penalty scored); Maria (penalty scored)		(penalty scored) Nguyễn Anh Đức; (penalty missed) Nguyễn Công Phượng; (penalty scored) Nguyễn Trọng Hoàng; (penalty scored) Quế Ngọc Hải; (penalty scored) Đoàn Văn Hậu

5 September World Cup qualifier R2	Thailand	0–0	Vietnam	Pathum Thani, Thailand
19:00 UTC+7		Report (FIFA); Report (AFC)		Stadium: Thammasat Stadium; Attendance: 19,011; Referee: Saoud Al-Adba (Qatar)

10 October World Cup qualifier R2	Vietnam	1–0	Malaysia	Hanoi, Vietnam
20:00 UTC+7	Nguyễn Quang Hải 40'	Report (FIFA); Report (AFC)		Stadium: Mỹ Đình National Stadium; Attendance: 38,256; Referee: Mooud Bonyadifard (Iran)

15 October World Cup qualifier R2	Indonesia	1–3	Vietnam	Gianyar, Indonesia
18:30 UTC+7	Bachdim 84'	Report (FIFA); Report (AFC)	Đỗ Duy Mạnh 26'; Quế Ngọc Hải 55' (pen.); Nguyễn Tiến Linh 61'	Stadium: Kapten I Wayan Dipta Stadium; Attendance: 8,237; Referee: Turki Al-Khudayr (Saudi Arabia)

14 November World Cup qualifier R2	Vietnam	1–0	United Arab Emirates	Hanoi, Vietnam
20:00 UTC+7	Nguyễn Tiến Linh 44'	Report (FIFA); Report (AFC)		Stadium: Mỹ Đình National Stadium; Attendance: 37,989; Referee: Jumpei Iida (Japan)

19 November World Cup qualifier R2	Vietnam	0–0	Thailand	Hanoi, Vietnam
20:00 UTC+7		Report (FIFA); Report (AFC)		Stadium: Mỹ Đình National Stadium; Attendance: 40,000; Referee: Ahmed Al-Kaf (Oman)

== Head-to-head records ==
Vietnam national football team head-to-head records (2010–2019)
Opponents	Pld	W	D	L	GF	GA	GD	Pts	Confederation
Afghanistan	2	0	2	0	1	1	0	2	AFC
Cambodia	4	4	0	0	12	2	+10	12	AFC
China	2	0	0	2	1	5	–4	0	AFC
Chinese Taipei	3	2	1	0	7	3	+4	7	AFC
Curaçao	1	0	1	0	1	1	0	1	CONCACAF
Hong Kong	5	3	1	1	10	6	+4	10	AFC
India	1	0	0	1	1	3	–2	0	AFC
Indonesia	8	2	5	1	13	11	+2	11	AFC
Iran	1	0	0	1	0	2	–2	0	AFC
Iraq	3	0	1	2	3	5	–2	1	AFC
Japan	2	0	0	2	0	2	–2	0	AFC
Jordan	3	0	3	0	2	2	0	3	AFC
Kuwait	1	0	0	1	1	3	–2	0	AFC
Laos	3	3	0	0	10	0	+10	9	AFC
Lebanon	1	0	1	0	1	1	0	1	AFC
Macau	2	2	0	0	13	1	+12	6	AFC
Malaysia	11	7	2	2	14	9	+5	23	AFC
Mozambique	1	1	0	0	1	0	+1	3	CAF
Myanmar	5	3	2	0	16	3	+13	11	AFC
North Korea	5	1	3	1	7	6	+1	6	AFC
Palestine	1	0	0	1	1	3	–2	0	AFC
Philippines	6	4	0	2	11	8	+3	12	AFC
Qatar	3	2	0	1	4	5	–1	6	AFC
Singapore	3	2	1	0	5	1	+4	7	AFC
Syria	1	1	0	0	2	0	+2	3	AFC
Thailand	6	1	2	3	2	7	–5	5	AFC
Turkmenistan	1	0	0	1	0	1	–1	0	AFC
United Arab Emirates	3	1	0	2	2	7	–5	3	AFC
Uzbekistan	2	0	0	2	1	6	–5	0	AFC
Yemen	1	1	0	0	2	0	+2	3	AFC
