= Valerie Hu =

American biologist

Valerie Wailin Hu
- Education: University of Hawaiʻi, California Institute of Technology
- Known for: Autism-related research
- Children: One son
- Scientific career
- Fields: Biochemistry, biological psychiatry, functional genomics
- Workplaces: George Washington University Medical School
- Thesis: Structure-function studies on cytochrome c oxidase. An investigation into the nature of the metal sites in cytochrome c oxidase using x-ray absorption spectroscopy. An investigation into the lipid factors affecting protein activity and respiratory control in reconstituted cytochrome c oxidase membranes. (1978)

Valerie Wailin Hu is a professor of biochemistry and molecular biology at George Washington University, where she studies autism biomarkers.

== Education ==
Hu has a bachelor's degree from the University of Hawaiʻi (1972) and a PhD from Caltech (1977); she conducted postdoctoral research into membrane biochemistry and immunology at the University of California, Los Angeles.

== Research ==
In her research, she classified autistic children into subgroups based on their Autism Diagnostic Interview-Revised scores, and, as a result, found single nucleotide polymorphisms which, she says, could allow autism to be diagnosed with over 98% accuracy. Specifically, Hu's research has demonstrated that levels of two proteins produced by genes which showed changes in DNA methylation were reduced in the brains of autistic children relative to controls. Based on this finding, Hu has proposed that the use of drugs which block the chemical tagging of these genes may be a useful treatment for autism. An additional topic of Hu's research has been her discovery that the gene RORA that may be under positive regulation by androgens, leading to a buildup of additional testosterone which may contribute to the male bias of autism. Hu's research has also found sex-specific variations in the cerebellar transcriptome that also indicates male bias for autism.
