= Từ Như Hiển =

Vietnamese footballer

Personal information
- Full name: Từ Như Hiển
- Date of birth: 16 June 1945
- Place of birth: New Caledonia
- Date of death: 15 September 2023 (aged 78)
- Place of death: Sa Pa, Lào Cai, Vietnam
- Height: 1.71 m (5 ft 7 in)
- Position: Forward

Senior career*
Years	Team	Apps	(Gls)
- Thanh niên Hà Nội
- Công An Hà Nội

International career
1965–197?	North Vietnam		
- * Club domestic league appearances and goals

Từ Như Hiển (16 June 1945 – 15 September 2023) was a footballer who played as a striker. Born in New Caledonia, he represented the North Vietnam national football team.

He was regarded as one of the best Vietnamese strikers during the 1960s and 1970s.

== Career ==
Born in New Caledonia to Vietnamese parents, Hiển repatriated with his family back to North Vietnam at the end of 1963. In the same year, he and his brother Từ Như Thành began their football career, playing for Thanh niên Hà Nội. He was nicknamed as "Hiển Cóoc" as people had mistaken that he came from Corse island, another French territory. Shortly after, he signed for Công An Hà Nội and later became the club legend, winning several top scorer awards and national titles for the team.

In 1965, Hiển received his first call up to the North Vietnam national football team and became one of the most important players of the team.

He died on 15 September 2023.
