= Hu Qinwu =

Chinese painter (born 1969)

Hu Qinwu (born 1969) is a painter, photographer, and printmaker from Shandong, China. Critics have noted that Qinwu's command of ink, tempera, acrylic, oil and print media signals the germination of an exciting new approach to traditional techniques and the burgeoning of an abstract style amongst a young generation of artists in Beijing.[4]

Qinwu studied oil painting at the Yantai Normal Academy, Shandong where he graduated in 1990.[2] He went onto attain a master's degree in Painting from the Central Academy of Fine Arts, Beijing in 2008.[3] In 2010 Qinwu taught as a guest lecturer at the Central Academy of Fine Art in Beijing.[2] Qinwu's choice of materials for his paintings align with the scholarly tradition of Chinese ink painting. However, Qinwu subverts the traditions of the medium through a style that aligns more closely with the aestheticisms of the Abstract movement. The concept behind his style and technique however, is informed by Zen Buddhist philosophies and practices.

== Art practice ==
Hu Qinwu's art is inextricable from the process of making.[4] For Hu Qinwu, the action of making offers a profound meditation that resonates with the practice of Zen, which is cultivated through contemplation, repetition and silence.[2] These philosophies and practices are captured on the deep yet restrained surface of Qinwu's paintings that are composed of an immeasurable number of deliberate brushstrokes. Qinwu's paintings are created through slowly building up the surface of the canvas.[5] For Qinwu, the effect of this intense concentration represents the conceptual culmination of probability and control that is the essence of life itself. Luise Guest stated that the relationship between life and art is visually represented in how, "order emerges out of the random application of marks."[4]

The rigorous process that underpins Qinwu's practice is visually apparent. The introspective nature of both his method of painting is represented through abstraction.[5] In his paintings, the technique of repetitive action denies a central focus point.[5] The aesthetic likeness of Qinwu's paintings to the tradition of Abstract art has led him to be compared to American Abstract Expressionist Mark Rothko. Through the use of colour and tone in both Rothko and Qinwu's paintings strive towards evoking an emotional or spiritual response in those who view them.[6] The emotions conveyed in Hu Qinwu's paintings, are a manifestation of the emotional investment it takes the artist to create each work. Qinwu said in an interview that the process of creating a painting to viewing that painting "is like going on a journey".[7]

== Exhibitions, collections and awards ==
Hu Qinwu exhibits regularly internationally in both solo and group exhibitions. Significant shows have included Meditations in 2016 at Niagara Galleries, Melbourne; KIAF 2016 / ART SEOUL in 2015 at Seoul COEX, Korea; Relative Existence – Hu Qinwu in 2014 at Boding Gallery, Beijing; The Seventh Abstract Art Exhibition in 2014 at PIFO Gallery, Beijing; Korea International Art Fair with Niagara Galleries in 2011 at COEX, Seoul, Korea; The Colour Grey in 2011 at Matthias Kuper Galleries in Stuttgart and Beijing; and 008 Phantasms in 2008 at China Art Projects, Beijing.[8] Qinwu's work is represented in countless collections across the globe, including in Beijing, Macau, Hong Kong, The United States of America, Australia and England.

Qinwu's practice has also been recognised through a number of awards. These have included an excellence award from the Second Small Painting Exhibition and the Best Innovative Idea prize in 2007, as well as first prize in Marie's Art Scholarship in 2008. Later in 2012, Qinwu was accepted to undertake the Beijing residency at the Gwangju Museum of Art Open Studios in South Korea, as well as the position of resident artist with TEMI in Daejeon, South Korea.
