= Yinling Hu =

Chinese molecular biologist

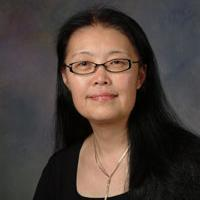
- Education: Peking Union Medical College; University of Melbourne (PhD)
- Scientific career
- Fields: Molecular biology
- Workplaces: University of Texas MD Anderson Cancer Center; National Cancer Institute
- Thesis: The regulatory elements responsible for expression of the homeobox gene Cdx-1 (1994)

Yinling Hu is a Chinese molecular biologist specialized in cancer immunometabolism, inflammation, and tumorigenesis. She is a senior investigator in the National Cancer Institute. She was an assistant professor at University of Texas MD Anderson Cancer Center.

== Education ==
Hu completed an undergraduate degree from the Peking Union Medical College and received her Ph.D. from the University of Melbourne. Her 1994 dissertation was titled The regulatory elements responsible for expression of the homeobox gene Cdx-1. She was a postdoctoral fellow in Michael Karin's laboratory, University of California, San Diego from 1996 to 2001.

== Career and research ==
Hu established her own laboratory in 2001 when she became an assistant professor at the Science Park Research Division, University of Texas MD Anderson Cancer Center. In 2008, she became a principal investigator in the National Cancer Institute's Cancer and Inflammation Program and was awarded tenure in 2016.

Hu's research focuses on understanding the physiological activities of IKKα in skin tumorigenesis and inflammation and in revealing the mechanisms by which IKKα regulates these functions by using genetic animal models, including Ikkα conditional knockout, Ikkα kinase inactive knockin and IKKα transgenic mice, as well as molecular biology approaches.
