= Chen Jiagen =

Chinese footballer

Personal information
- Date of birth: 1939
- Date of death: 13 December 2011 (aged 71–72)
- Place of death: Beijing, China
- Position: Forward

Senior career*
Years	Team	Apps	(Gls)
- Shanghai Football Team

International career
1963–1966	China	3	(6)

Managerial career
- 1977: China U20
- 1978: China U20
- * Club domestic league appearances and goals

Chen Jiagen (simplified Chinese: 陈家根; traditional Chinese: 陳家根; pinyin: Chén Jiāgēn; 1939 – 13 December 2011) was a Chinese footballer who played as a forward for the China national football team. He coached the national U-20 side for short spells in 1977 and 1978.

== Career statistics ==
=== International ===
National team	Year	Apps	Goals
China
China	1963	2	3
China	1964	0	0
China	1965	0	0
China	1966	1	3
Total		3	6

=== International goals ===
Scores and results list China's goal tally first.

No	Date	Venue	Opponent	Score	Result	Competition
1.	6 February 1963	Pakistan	Pakistan	–	2–0	Friendly
2.	4 September 1963	China	Burma	–	4–0	Friendly
3.	4 September 1963	China	Burma	–	4–0	Friendly
4.	28 June 1966	China	Tanzania	–	10–4	Friendly
5.	28 June 1966	China	Tanzania	–	10–4	Friendly
6.	28 June 1966	China	Tanzania	–	10–4	Friendly

== Managerial statistics ==
Managerial record by team and tenure
Team	From	To	Record				
Team	From	To	P	W	D	L	Win %
China U20	1977	1977	0	0	0	0	—
China U20	1978	1978	6	2	0	4	33.3
Total			6	2	0	4	33.3
