= Wei-Shau Hu =

American geneticist

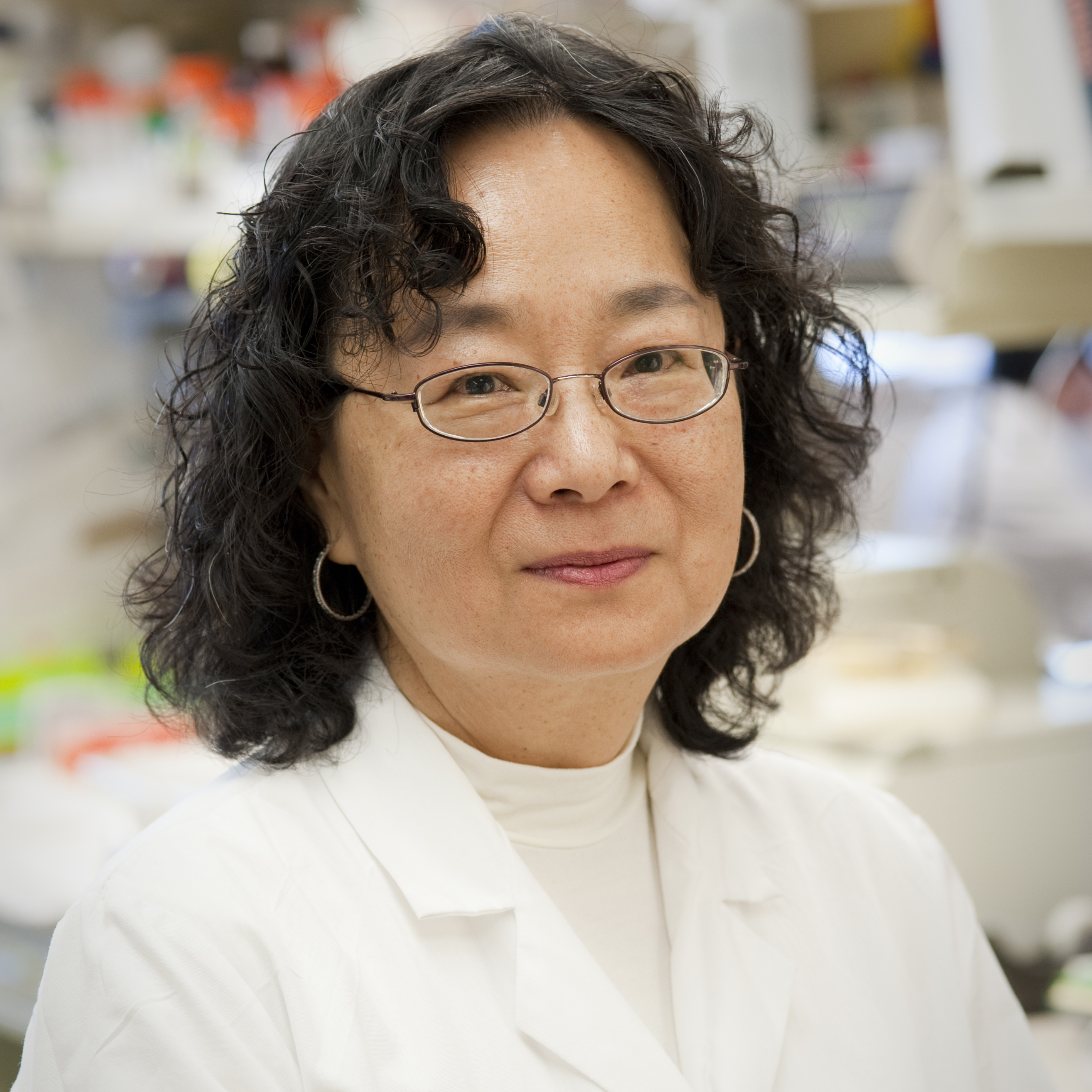
- Education: University of California, Davis (PhD)
- Scientific career
- Fields: Genetics, HIV research
- Workplaces: West Virginia University; National Cancer Institute
- Thesis: Homologous DNA recombination in primate cells of human adult alpha globin gene duplication units (1987)

Wei-Shau Hu is an American geneticist specialized in HIV research, retroviral recombination, RNA packaging, and virus assembly. She is a senior investigator at the National Cancer Institute and head of the viral recombination section. She was an associate professor at West Virginia University.

== Education ==
Wei-Shau Hu received her Ph.D. in Genetics from the University of California, Davis, in 1987. Her dissertation was titled Homologous DNA recombination in primate cells of human adult alpha globin gene duplication units. She studied the mechanisms of DNA recombination that lead to human alpha-thalassemia in James Shen's laboratory. Under Howard Martin Temin's guidance, she studied the mechanisms of retroviral recombination as a postdoctoral fellow at the University of Wisconsin.

== Career ==
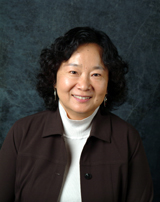
Wei-Shau Hu

In 1991, Hu joined the faculty of West Virginia University as an Assistant Professor in the Department of Microbiology and Immunobiology and the Mary Babb Randolph Cancer Center. She was promoted to Associate Professor with tenure in 1998. In 1999, she joined the National Cancer Institute (NCI) as Senior Investigator and Head of the Viral Recombination Section in the HIV Drug Resistance Program (renamed the HIV Dynamics and Replication Program in 2015). Hu was an organizer of the 2009 Cold Spring Harbor Retroviruses conference. She served as the Frederick representative of Women Science Advisors for the National Cancer Institute from 2012 to 2016 and as a member of the AIDS Molecular and Cellular Biology Study Section of the National Institutes of Health extramural grant funding programs from 2010 to 2016. In 2012, she was the recipient of one of the five grants that the U.S.-Russia Joint Working Group on Biomedical Research Cooperation awarded to National Cancer Institute intramural investigators for their highly meritorious research applications; Hu's application was focused on understanding the impact of HIV-1 recombination and cell-to-cell transmission on vaccine development and chemoprevention strategy. She currently serves as a member of the National Cancer Institute Promotion Review Panel, the AIDS Molecular and Cellular Biology Study Section of the NIH extramural grant funding programs, and the NCI RNA Biology Initiative.

=== Research ===
Hu is recognized as an authority on retroviral recombination, RNA packaging, and virus assembly. Her innovations in combining molecular biology and biochemical approaches with state-of-the-art microscopy techniques for single-virion particle analysis have led to advancements in HIV molecular virology research. Under Hu’s direction, the NCI Viral Recombination Section investigates multiple aspects of the retroviral life cycle that affect the transfer of viral genetic information. These studies have implications for questions that are fundamentally important to HIV replication, which can be used to generate new strategies to block the spread of HIV. Dr. Hu has conducted extensive work measuring rates of HIV‑1 recombination, including recombination at various inter‑marker distances, demonstrating that recombination can be very frequent even when markers are close (approaching maximal measurable rates). She also studies recombination between divergent lentiviruses, and how recombination contributes to viral diversity, replication efficiency, and evolution. This includes investigating whether inter‑subtype or inter‐lentivirus recombination occurs, what limits or promotes it, and how recombinants perform in different environments (the “Genetic Recombination in Retroviruses” grant page).
