= Cong Zheyu =

Chinese footballer

Personal information
- Date of birth: 1934 (age 91–92)
- Place of birth: Dalian, Liaoning, China
- Position: Forward

Senior career*
Years	Team	Apps	(Gls)
- Beijing

International career
1956–1960	China	5	(3)

Managerial career
- 1986–1988: China (women)
- * Club domestic league appearances and goals

Cong Zheyu (simplified Chinese: 丛者余; traditional Chinese: 叢者余; pinyin: Cóng Zhěyú) is a former Chinese footballer who played as a forward for the China national football team. He was the first coach of the China women's football team.

== Career statistics ==
=== International ===
National team	Year	Apps	Goals
China	1956	1	1
China	1957	2	1
China	1960	2	1
Total		5	3

=== International goals ===
Scores and results list China's goal tally first.

No	Date	Venue	Opponent	Score	Result	Competition
1.	17 June 1956	New Delhi, India	India	1–0	1–0	Friendly
2.	27 June 1957	Rangoon, Burma	Burma	–	1–2	Friendly
3.	11 October 1960	Hanoi, North Vietnam	North Vietnam	–	4–3	Friendly
