= Yi Hu =

Yi Hu is an engineer with Quanta Technology in Raleigh, North Carolina. He was named a Fellow of the Institute of Electrical and Electronics Engineers (IEEE) in 2015 for his contributions to wide-area synchronized measurement systems.
