= Chen Jialiang =

Chinese footballer and football officer

Chen Jialiang 陈家亮
Personal information
- Full name: Chen Jialiang
- Date of birth: 27 October 1933
- Place of birth: Dalian, Liaoning, China
- Date of death: 28 January 2016 (aged 82)
- Place of death: Beijing, China
- Position: Forward

Youth career
- 1952: Jin County football team
- 1953: Dalian youth football team

Senior career*
Years	Team	Apps	(Gls)
- Beijing
- Beijing sports college football team

International career
1959–1963	China	2	(1)

Managerial career
- China(assistant)
- * Club domestic league appearances and goals

Chen Jialiang (Chinese: 陈家亮; 27 October 1933 – 28 January 2016) was a Chinese international football player and former vice chairman of the Chinese Football Association.

== Biography ==
Chen Jialiang was born in Dalian. He worked at the Jinzhou textile factory when he was 17 years old and began his football career in the factory football team. He then joined the Dalian youth football team. Chen represented in the 1953 national youth football match, where he won third place. In 1954, Chen was elected to the China youth football team to Hungary for football study. After he back China, Chen joined the Beijing Sports College football team and was called up to China national football team.

In 1964, Chen retired from football because of a broken leg. He went back to Dalian to help with youth player training work. Later, Chen came to Beijing to work as assistant coach of China national football team. After the 1970s, he had successively served as section chief of football of the Sports Department of China, the head of Football departments of the Sports Department of China, Chen served as vice chairman of the Chinese Football Association from 1979 to 1985.

On 28 January 2016, Chen died in a traffic accident in Beijing, age 82.
