= Hu Denghui =

Chinese footballer

Hu Denghui 胡登辉

Personal information
- Full name: Hu Denghui
- Date of birth: 1941
- Place of birth: Beijing, China
- Date of death: 1969 (aged 27)
- Place of death: Beijing, China
- Height: 1.74 m (5 ft 8 1/2 in)
- Position: Forward

Youth career
- Beijing
- Bayi

Senior career*
Years	Team	Apps	(Gls)
- Bayi

International career
1965–1966	China		
- * Club domestic league appearances and goals

Hu Denghui (simplified Chinese: 胡登辉; traditional Chinese: 胡登輝; pinyin: Hú Dēnghuī; 1941–1969) was a Chinese footballer.

== Club career ==
In 1962, Hu graduated from Beijing Sport University. Hu played youth football for both Beijing and Bayi before making the step-up to Bayi's senior team.

== International career ==
In March 1965, Hu made his debut for China, playing against Guinea, Mali and Albania as part of a tour. On 28 June 1966, Hu scored a hat-trick in a 10–4 victory against Tanzania. Just under a month later, on 23 July 1966, Hu scored another hat-trick for China, this time in a 6–0 win over Syria.

== Death ==
Starting in 1966, Hu began to be the victim of persecution as a result of the Cultural Revolution, being accused of being a "counterrevolutionary". During the same time, his father was imprisoned. In 1969, Hu hanged himself from a tree in Yuanmingyuan Park in Beijing. At the time of Hu's death, he only weighed 40 kg.
