= North Vietnam national football team =

National association football team of North Vietnam

Democratic Republic of Vietnam
1956–1975
- Association: Vietnam Football Association
- Home stadium: Hàng Đẫy Stadium
- FIFA code: VNO
First colours	Second colours	Goalkeeper colours

First international
- China 5–3 North Vietnam (Beijing, China, 4 October 1956)

Last international
- North Vietnam 3–3 China (Hanoi, North Vietnam, 27 December 1974)

Biggest win
- North Yemen 0–9 North Vietnam (Phnom Penh, Cambodia; 15 November 1966)

Biggest defeat
- North Korea 5–0 North Vietnam (Pyongyang, North Korea, 22 October 1959)

The Democratic Republic of Vietnam national football team (Vietnamese: Đội tuyển bóng đá quốc gia Việt Nam Dân chủ Cộng hòa) was the national team of the communist-controlled Democratic Republic of Vietnam (known as "North Vietnam") from 1956 to 1975.

It existed side by side with a separate South Vietnam team, which already appeared in 1949 before the country's division and represented the capitalist-oriented southern portion of Vietnam. Unlike South Vietnam (which was a member of both FIFA and the AFC), North Vietnam's lack of diplomatic recognition on the part of many other states initially prevented it from joining either FIFA or the AFC. However, North Vietnam became a member of FIFA in 1964. Despite this, it never participated in qualification for the FIFA World Cup or the AFC Asian Cup, and its international matches were mainly limited to Communist and Communist-sympathizing countries during its relatively short-lived existence.

The North Vietnam football team played its last game in 1974 and ceased to exist with the unification of North and South Vietnam in 1975 (officially in 1976), when the Vietnam War ended. Even though the North emerged victorious in the war and unified the country, the current Vietnam national football team is considered a successor of both North and South Vietnam teams.

== History ==
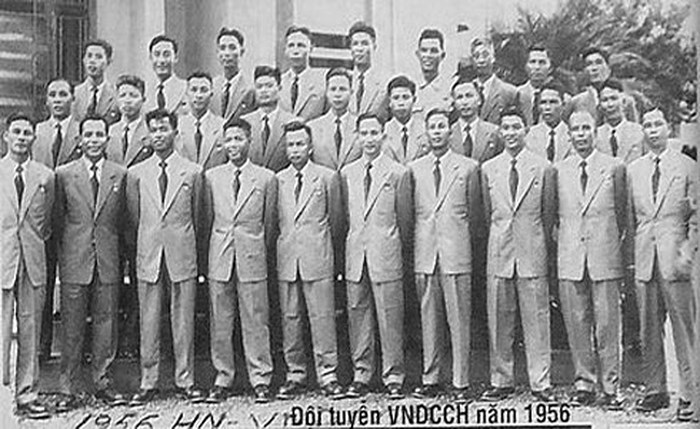
North Vietnam team in 1956

Although "North Vietnamese" government was proclaimed in 1945, Vietnam was only divided in 1954 and their first international match was against China in 1956, two years after their existence was recognized. Their head coach, Trương Tấn Bửu, played a 3-2-5 (WM) formation but the game ended in a 3–5 defeat. The team recorded their first victory in 1960 with a 3–1 win against Mongolia.

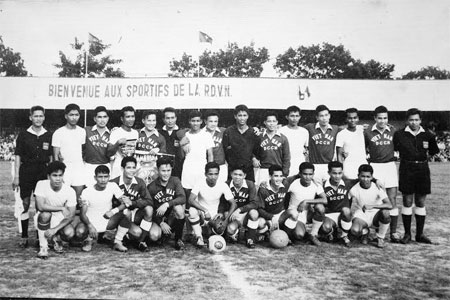
North Vietnam team at the 1966 GANEFO Asia Cup in Cambodia

Since North Vietnam was not a member of major international federations such as FIFA (until 1964), the AFC, or the International Olympic Committee, its football team participated in very few international competitions. Their most notorious international participations were in the football tournament of the Games of the New Emerging Forces (GANEFO). North Vietnam proved to be a relatively strong side in the GANEFO competition, finishing fourth in the 1963 edition (only losing third place to a university team representing Uruguay on a coin toss) and third in the 1966 edition. North Vietnam also earned third place in the football-only GANEFO event that took place in 1965.

After Vietnamese reunification in 1975, both North and South Vietnamese teams were superseded by the Vietnam national football team, which represents the unified Socialist Republic of Vietnam. With unified Vietnam having taken over South Vietnam's membership of FIFA and the AFC, its historical football record is nominally merged with that of South Vietnam, while North Vietnam is treated as a separate team.

== Kit ==
The home kit of North Vietnam was similar to the kit of the Soviet Union consisting of a red shirt, with the legend "VIET NAM DCCH" ("Democratic Republic of Vietnam") across the front in white, white shorts and white-red socks. The away kit was a white shirt with "VIET NAM DCCH" across the chest in red, red shorts and red-white socks.

The goalkeeper's kit was a black shirt with a white collar, black shorts and socks.

== Head coaches ==
- (North Vietnam) Trương Tấn Bửu (1956–1957)
- (Soviet Union) Anatoly Akimov (1958–1960)
- (Soviet Union) Viktor Zharkov (1962–1963)
- (Soviet Union) Veniamin Krylov (1965–1966)
- (North Vietnam) Nguyễn Thành Đô (1966–196?)
- (North Vietnam) Nguyễn Văn Quý (Unknown)
- (North Vietnam) Nguyễn Văn Đinh (Unknown)

== Competitive record ==
=== World Cup record ===
FIFA World Cup record									FIFA World Cup qualification record					
Year	Round	Position	Pld	W	D*	L	GF	GA	Pld	W	D*	L	GF	GA
(Brazil) 1950	Not member of FIFA								Not member of FIFA					
(Switzerland) 1954	Not member of FIFA								Not member of FIFA					
(Sweden) 1958	Not member of FIFA								Not member of FIFA					
(Chile) 1962	Not member of FIFA								Not member of FIFA					
(England) 1966	Did not participate								Did not participate					
(Mexico) 1970	Did not participate								Did not participate					
(West Germany) 1974	Did not participate								Did not participate					
Total	—	0/7	0	0	0	0	0	0	0	0	0	0	0	0

=== Asian Cup record ===
AFC Asian Cup record									AFC Asian Cup qualification record					
Year	Round	Position	Pld	W	D*	L	GF	GA	Pld	W	D*	L	GF	GA
(Hong Kong) 1956	Not member of AFC								Not member of AFC					
(South Korea) 1960	Not member of AFC								Not member of AFC					
(Israel) 1964	Not member of AFC								Not member of AFC					
(Iran) 1968	Not member of AFC								Not member of AFC					
(Thailand) 1972	Not member of AFC								Not member of AFC					
(Iran) 1976	Not member of AFC								Not member of AFC					
Total	—	0/6	0	0	0	0	0	0	0	0	0	0	0	0

=== GANEFO ===
GANEFO record									Qualification record					
Year	Round	Position	Pld	W	D*	L	GF	GA	Pld	W	D*	L	GF	GA
(Indonesia) 1963	Fourth place	4th	6	3	1	2	22	12	3	1	0	2	4	6
(North Korea) 1965	Third place	3rd	5	1	2	2	7	8	No qualification					
(Cambodia) 1966	Third place	3rd	5	2	1	2	16	7	No qualification					
Total	Third place	3/3	16	6	4	6	45	27	3	1	0	2	4	6

== Head-to-head record ==
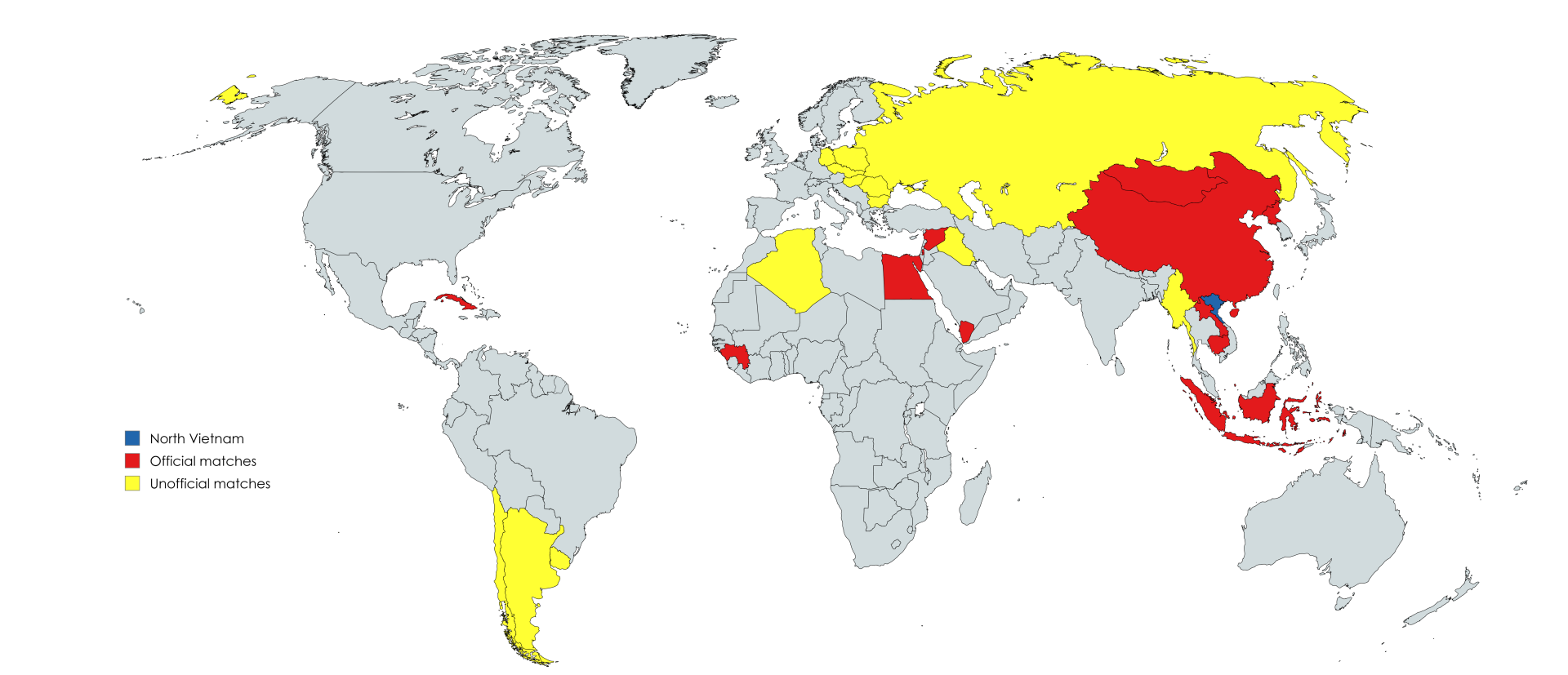

The list shown below shows the North Vietnam national football team all-time international record against opposing teams.

Key

Positive balance
Neutral balance
Negative balance

North Vietnam national football team head-to-head records
Opponent	Pld	W	D	L	GF	GA	GD	Win %	Confederation
Burma	1	0	1	0	1	1	0	00.00	AFC
Cambodia	10	4	4	2	16	13	+3	40.00	AFC
China	7	0	2	5	12	20	–8	00.00	AFC
Cuba	2	1	1	0	3	2	+1	50.00	CONCACAF
Guinea	1	1	0	0	2	1	+1	100.00	CAF
Indonesia	2	0	0	2	2	5	–3	00.00	AFC
Laos	1	1	0	0	9	1	+8	100.00	AFC
Mongolia	1	1	0	0	3	1	+2	100.00	AFC
North Korea	6	0	0	6	2	17	–15	00.00	AFC
North Yemen	1	1	0	0	9	0	+9	100.00	AFC
Palestine	1	1	0	0	4	0	+4	100.00	AFC
United Arab Republic	1	0	0	1	1	4	–3	00.00	CAF
Total	34	10	8	16	64	65	–1	29.41	

== Honours ==
- GANEFO
  - (bronze) Third place (2): 1965, 1966

== See also ==
- Football in Vietnam
