= 2015 Chonburi F.C. season =

Chonburi
2015 season
- Chairman: Wittaya Khunpluem
- Manager: Jadet Meelarp
- Stadium: Chonburi Stadium
- Thai Premier League: 4th
- Thai FA Cup: Quarter-finals
- Thai League Cup: Round of 16
- AFC Champions League: Play-off round
- Top goalscorer: League: Thiago Cunha (19); All: Thiago Cunha (21)
Home colours	Away colours

The 2015 season is Chonburi's 10th season in the Thai Premier League of Chonburi Football Club.

== Pre-season and friendlies ==
Date	Opponents	H / A	Result F–A	Scorers
12 December 2014	Navy	H	0–1	
17 December 2014	Samut Prakan	H	2–1	Chakrit 70', Therdsak 73' (pen.)
24 December 2014	(Vietnam) Hoàng Anh Gia Lai	H	0–3	
27 December 2014	Port	H	1–1	Nurul 11'
10 January 2015	(Malaysia) Kedah	H	1–0	Patipan 48'
14 January 2015	Muangkan XI	A	4–1	Mineiro 13', Nurul 18', Kirati 40', Chakrit 69'
17 January 2015	Nakhon Pathom	A	3–5	Anderson 26', Assumpção 31', Chakrit 62'
23 January 2015	Army United	H	2–1	Anderson 18' (pen.), Assumpção 38',
25 January 2015	Suphanburi	H	2–3	Chakrit 42', Mineiro 46'
30 January 2015	Port	A	1–3	Mineiro 74'
4 February 2015	PTT Rayong	H	2–2	Cunha (2) 67', 74'
21 March 2015	PTT Rayong	H	1–2	Kroekrit 53' (pen.)
24 March 2015	Pattaya United	A	3–2	Assumpção (2) 53', 72', Mineiro 70'
26 March 2015	Thai Honda Ladkrabang	H	2–2	Pipob 19', Kirati 21'
1 April 2015	Rangsit	H	5–1	Anderson 20' (pen.), Kirati 24', Boonkerd 56', Pipob 58', Sittichok 87'

== Thai Premier League ==
Toyota Thai Premier League

Date	Opponents	H / A	Result F–A	Scorers	League position
13 February 2015	Gulf Saraburi	A	3–1; Highlight	Cunha 3', Kirati 81', Mineiro 89'	1st
22 February 2015	Chainat Hornbill	H	2–2; Highlight	Nurul 62', Kirati 87'	3rd
1 March 2015	Ratchaburi Mitr Phol	A	1–3; Highlight	Assumpção 58'	10th
8 March 2015	BEC Tero Sasana	H	2–2; Highlight	Suttinan 50', Assumpção 65'	11th
11 March 2015	Buriram United	A	1–1; Highlight	Seul-Ki 84' (o.g.)	10th
5 April 2015	Nakhon Ratchasima Mazda	H	2–2; Highlight	Mineiro 34', Pipob 87'	11th
26 April 2015	Bangkok Glass	A	2–2; Highlight	Assumpção 47', Byung-kuk 74'	13th
29 April 2015	Port MTI	H	4–1; Highlight	Cunha 53', Chonlatit 62', Nurul 64', Assumpção 90+1'	9th
3 May 2015	Suphanburi	A	0–0; Highlight		9th
9 May 2015	Sisaket	H	1–1; Highlight	Cunha 85'	9th
21 June 2015	Chiangrai United	A	1–1; Highlight	Phuritad 4'	8th
28 June 2015	SCG Muangthong United	H	2–1; Highlight	Cunha 21' (pen.), Nurul 41'	8th
4 July 2015	Navy	H	2–0; Highlight	Assumpção 17', Anderson 28'	8th
12 July 2015	Bangkok United	A	1–1; Highlight	Korrakot 4'	8th
15 July 2015	TOT	H	4–0; Highlight	Kirati 45+2', Assumpção 59', Suriya 67' (o.g.), Mineiro 90'	7th
19 July 2015	Army United	A	2–1; Highlight	Kirati (2) 53', 60'	6th
25 July 2015	Osotspa M-150	H	2–0; Highlight	Nurul 34', Kirati 51'	6th
1 August 2015	Chainat Hornbill	A	5–1; Highlight	Cunha (2) 4', 86', Anderson 73', Assumpção (2) 80', 89'	4th
8 August 2015	Ratchaburi Mitr Phol	H	2–1; Highlight	Byung-kuk 20', Worachit 84'	4th
16 August 2015	BEC Tero Sasana	A	2–1; Highlight	Cunha (2) 41', 52 (pen.)	4th
19 August 2015	Buriram United	H	1–2; Highlight	Anderson 4'	5th
12 September 2015	Bangkok Glass	H	2–2; Highlight	Cunha (2) 45+3' (pen.), 76'	4th
20 September 2015	Port MTI	A	1–3; Highlight	Pipob 31'	5th
27 September 2015	Suphanburi	H	2–2; Highlight	Mineiro 8', Korrakot 90+5'	5th
17 October 2015	Sisaket	A	1–1; Highlight	Cunha 36'	6th
24 October 2015	Chiangrai United	H	4–0; Highlight	Cunha (3) 27', 76', 81', Assumpção 30'	6th
28 October 2015	SCG Muangthong United	A	2–4; Highlight	Anderson 62', Mineiro 90+2'	6th
1 November 2015	Navy	A	2–1; Highlight	Cunha (2) 20', 47'	3rd
15 November 2015	Nakhon Ratchasima Mazda	A	0–1; Highlight		5th
22 November 2015	Bangkok United	H	1–0; Highlight	Cunha 22'	3rd
29 November 2015	TOT	A	2–0; Highlight	Mineiro 4' (pen.), Assumpção 88'	3rd
6 December 2015	Army United	H	3–2; Highlight	Cunha (2) 73' (pen.), 77', Mineiro 88'	3rd
9 December 2015	Osotspa M-150 Samut Prakan	A	0–1; Highlight		4th
13 December 2015	Saraburi	H	0–3; Highlight		4th

=== League table ===
Pos	Team	Pld	W	D	L	GF	GA	GD	Pts	Qualification or relegation
2	Muangthong United (Q)	34	21	8	5	81	35	+46	71	2016 AFC Champions League Qualifying play-off (Note: The winners of the 2015 Thai FA Cup will also qualify for the play-off of the 2016 AFC Champions League. Since the FA Cup winners have already qualified to ACL through the championship and runners-up - because the Thai FA Cup Final is between Buriram and Muangthong - the spot will be awarded to the third-placed team.)
3	Suphanburi	34	16	11	7	60	39	+21	59	
4	Chonburi (Q)	34	15	12	7	62	44	+18	57 (Note: CHO 1–0 BKU; BKU 1–1 CHO)	2016 AFC Champions League Qualifying play-off
5	Bangkok United	34	16	9	9	59	47	+12	57	
6	Bangkok Glass	34	15	11	8	47	38	+9	56	

Updated to match(es) played on 13 December 2015. Source: Thai Premier League
Rules for classification: 1) points; 2) head-to-head points; 3) head-to-head goal difference; 4) goal difference; 5) number of goals scored
(Q) Qualified for the phase indicated

== AFC Champions League ==
Date	Opponents	H / A	Result F–A	Scorers	Round
10 February 2015	(Hong Kong) Kitchee	H	4–1; Highlight	Assumpção (3) 8', 38', 55', Nurul 26'	Preliminary round 2
17 February 2015	(Japan) Kashiwa Reysol	A	2–3 (a.e.t.)	Assumpção 10', Kroekrit 64'	Play-off round

== Thai FA Cup ==
Chang FA Cup

Date	Opponents	H / A	Result F–A	Scorers	Round
24 June 2015	Khonkaen	H	1–0	Therdsak 55'	Round of 64
29 July 2015	Sukhothai	A	2–1	Mineiro 45+1', Cunha 66'	Round of 32
12 August 2015	Sisaket	A	3–2 (a.e.t.); Highlight	Cunha 53', Therdsak 112', Kroekrit 114'	Round of 16
23 September 2015	Buriram United	H	0–1; Highlight		Quarter-finals

== Thai League Cup ==
Toyota League Cup

Date	Opponents	H / A	Result F–A	Scorers	Round
18 April 2015	Rajapruk University Muangnont United	H	2–0; Highlight	Pipob 68', Nurul 79'	Round of 64
1 July 2015	PTU Pathum Thani Seeker	A	4–0	Kirati 23', Mineiro (2) 45+2', 49', Wanit 88'	Round of 32
22 July 2015	Pattaya United	A	1–3; Highlight	Mineiro 34'	Round of 16

== Squad statistics ==
No.	Pos.	Name	League		FA Cup		League Cup		Asia		Total		Discipline	
No.	Pos.	Name	Apps	Goals	Apps	Goals	Apps	Goals	Apps	Goals	Apps	Goals	Yellow card	Red card
1	GK	(Thailand) Pitawat Chamnongchob	2	0	0	0	2	0	0	0	4	0	0	0
2	DF	(Thailand) Noppanon Kachaplayuk	0(1)	0	0	0	0	0	0	0	0(1)	0	0	0
4	MF	(Thailand) Kroekrit Thaweekarn	31	0	2(2)	1	0(2)	0	2	1	35(4)	2	7	1
5	DF	(Thailand) Niweat Siriwong	1(4)	0	1	0	1	0	0	0	3(4)	0	0	0
6	DF	(Thailand) Suttinan Phuk-hom	20	1	1(2)	0	1	0	2	0	24(2)	1	3	0
7	MF	(Thailand) Chakrit Buathong	4(2)	0	0	0	3	0	0(2)	0	7(4)	0	0	0
8	MF	(Thailand) Therdsak Chaiman (vc)	2(19)	0	1(2)	2	0	0	0(1)	0	3(22)	2	0	0
10	FW	(Thailand) Pipob On-Mo (c)	7(15)	2	2(2)	0	1	1	0	0	10(17)	3	4	0
11	DF	(Thailand) Korrakot Wiriyaudomsiri	29(2)	2	3(1)	0	0(1)	0	2	0	34(4)	2	6	1
13	DF	(Thailand) Rachanon Kanyathong	6(2)	0	0	0	0	0	0	0	6(2)	0	0	0
15	MF	(Thailand) Phuritad Jarikanon	21	1	4	0	1	0	1	0	27	1	10	2
16	DF	(Thailand) Alongkorn Prathumwong	5	0	1	0	3	0	0	0	9	0	0	0
17	FW	(Brazil) Leandro Assumpção	27(7)	10	3(1)	0	2	0	2	4	34(8)	14	2	0
18	GK	(Thailand) Sinthaweechai Hathairattanakool	29	0	4	0	1	0	2	0	36	0	0	0
19	MF	(Thailand) Adul Lahso	23	0	4	0	1	0	2	0	30	0	4	0
20	MF	(Brazil) Juliano Mineiro	19(9)	7	1	1	2	3	2	0	24(9)	11	12	0
21	DF	(Thailand) Visaroot Vaingan	4	0	0	0	3	0	0	0	7	0	1	0
24	DF	(South Korea) Cho Byung-kuk	20(2)	2	2	0	2	0	1	0	25(2)	2	2	1
25	DF	(Thailand) Chonlatit Jantakam	31	1	4	0	1(1)	0	2	0	38(1)	1	9	0
26	DF	(Brazil) Anderson	30	4	4	0	2	0	2	0	38	4	8	0
27	FW	(Thailand) Boonkerd Chaiyasin	0(1)	0	0	0	0	0	0	0	0(1)	0	0	0
28	FW	(Thailand) Sittichok Phaso	0(5)	0	0	0	0	0	0	0	0(5)	0	0	0
29	GK	(Thailand) Watthanapong Tabutda	2	0	0	0	0	0	0	0	2	0	0	0
30	GK	(Thailand) Chakhon Philakhlang	1	0	0	0	0	0	0	0	1	0	0	0
31	MF	(Thailand) Nurul Sriyankem	21(6)	4	2	0	0(3)	1	2	1	25(9)	6	2	0
32	MF	(Thailand) Worachit Kanitsribampen	4(9)	1	0	0	0	0	0	0	4(9)	1	0	0
35	FW	(Thailand) Wanit Chaisan	0	0	0	0	0(1)	1	0	0	0(1)	1	0	0
36	DF	(Thailand) Surawich Logarwit	3(2)	0	0	0	1	0	0(1)	0	4(3)	0	2	0
37	FW	(Brazil) Thiago Cunha	20(4)	19	4	2	2	0	0	0	26(4)	21	12	0
39	FW	(Thailand) Kirati Keawsombat	4(6)	6	0	0	2(1)	1	0(1)	0	6(8)	7	3	0
40	MF	(Thailand) Warut Supphaso	8(6)	0	1(2)	0	2	0	0(1)	0	11(9)	0	4	1
—	—	Own goals	–	1	–	0	–	0	–	0	–	1	–	–

== Transfers ==
First Thai footballer's market is opening on 6 November 2014 to 28 January 2015.

Second Thai footballer's market is opening on 3 June 2015 to 30 June 2015.

=== In ===
Date	Pos.	Name	From
5 November 2014	MF	(Thailand) Warut Supphaso	(Thailand) Port
6 November 2014	DF	(Thailand) Alongkorn Prathumwong	(Thailand) Sisaket
18 November 2014	MF	(Thailand) Phuritad Jarikanon	(Thailand) Bangkok Glass
21 November 2014	FW	(Australia) Brent McGrath	(Thailand) Sisaket
14 December 2014	DF	(Thailand) Visaroot Vaingan	(Thailand) Port
6 January 2015	GK	(Thailand) Watthanapong Tabutda	(Thailand) Army United
9 January 2015	DF	(South Korea) Cho Byung-kuk	(China) Shanghai Greenland Shenhua
11 January 2015	FW	(Brazil) Leandro Assumpção	(Thailand) Chiangrai United
28 January 2015	GK	(Thailand) Pitthawas Chumnongchob	(Thailand) Chainat Hornbill

=== Out ===
Date	Pos.	Name	To
28 January 2015	DF	(Thailand) Natthaphong Samana	(Thailand) Suphanburi
28 January 2015	GK	(Thailand) Pattanan Pijittham	(Thailand) Suphanburi
28 January 2015	MF	(Thailand) Baworn Tapla	(Thailand) Suphanburi
28 January 2015	FW	(Brazil) Andre Araujo	(Thailand) BBCU
28 January 2015	MF	(Japan) Yuki Bamba	(Thailand) BBCU
28 January 2015	GK	(Thailand) Worawit Kaewwiharn	(Thailand) Police United
28 January 2015	DF	(Ivory Coast) Fodé Diakité	(Thailand) BEC Tero Sasana
3 June 2015	DF	(Thailand) Patipan Un-Op	(Thailand) Buriram United
3 June 2015	DF	(Thailand) Surawich Logarwit	(Thailand) PTT Rayong
13 July 2015	MF	(Japan) Kazuto Kushida	(Thailand) Chainat Hornbill
31 July 2015	FW	(Thailand) Wanit Chaisan	(Thailand) Prachuap
31 July 2015	MF	(Thailand) Chakrit Buathong	(Thailand) Suphanburi
31 July 2015	GK	(Thailand) Pitthawas Chumnongchob	(Thailand) Ubon UMT United

=== Loan in ===
Date from	Date to	Pos.	Name	From
8 January 2015	13 July 2015	FW	(Thailand) Kirati Keawsombat	(Thailand) PTT Rayong

=== Loan out ===
Date from	Date to	Pos.	Name	To
28 January 2015	31 December 2015	GK	(Thailand) Chanin Sae-Eae	(Thailand) Chainat Hornbill
28 January 2015	3 June 2015	DF	(Thailand) Rachanon Kanyathong	(Thailand) Chainat Hornbill
28 January 2015	31 December 2015	DF	(Thailand) Piyawit Janput	(Thailand) Chainat Hornbill
28 January 2015	3 June 2015	FW	(Thailand) Sukree Etae	(Thailand) Nara United
28 January 2015	31 December 2015	FW	(Australia) Brent McGrath	(Thailand) Port
28 January 2015	3 June 2015	MF	(Japan) Kazuto Kushida	(Thailand) Phan Thong
28 January 2015	2 June 2015	DF	(Thailand) Patipan Un-Op	(Thailand) TOT
3 June 2015	31 December 2015	FW	(Thailand) Sukree Etae	(Thailand) Chainat
