= 2017 Chonburi F.C. season =

Chonburi
2017 season
- Chairman: Wittaya Khunpluem
- Manager: Therdsak Chaiman
- Stadium: Chonburi Stadium, Mueang Chonburi, Chonburi, Thailand
- Thai League T1: 7th
- Thai FA Cup: Round of 64
- Thai League Cup: Round of 16
- Top goalscorer: League: Renan Marques (27); All: Renan Marques (27)
Home colours	Away colours

The 2017 season is Chonburi's 12th season in the Thai League T1 since 2006.

== Thai League ==
Date	Opponents	H / A	Result F–A	Scorers	League position
12 February 2017	Buriram United	A	2–2	Nurul (2) 38', 41'	9th
19 February 2017	Pattaya United	A	1–2	Fodé 68'	12th
26 February 2017	Nakhon Ratchasima Mazda	H	0–0		15th
5 March 2017	SCG Muangthong United	H	0–3		17th
8 March 2017	Super Power Samut Prakan	H	3–1	Renan 36' (pen.), Prince 39', Prakit 90+1'	13th
12 March 2017	Sisaket	A	2–1	Renan (2) 56', 77'	8th
3 April 2017	Ratchaburi Mitr Phol	H	2–0	Renan (2) 77' (pen.), 90' (pen.)	7th
8 April 2017	Suphanburi	A	1–0	Renan 39'	7th
18 April 2017	Bangkok United	H	1–5	Renan 78'	7th
22 April 2017	Navy	H	0–0		8th
29 April 2017	Thai Honda Ladkrabang	A	3–1	Renan (2) 18', 24', Fodé 73'	7th
3 May 2017	Port	H	2–1	Renan 24' (pen.), Prince 88'	6th
6 May 2017	Ubon UMT United	A	0–0		7th
12 May 2017	Chiangrai United	H	3–1	Fodé 50', Renan (2) 73', 86' (pen.)	5th
17 May 2017	Bangkok Glass	A	0–3		6th
21 May 2017	Sukhothai	H	3–2	Prince 17', Renan 33' (pen.), Nurul 69'	6th
27 May 2017	BEC Tero Sasana	A	3–1	Nurul 43', Renan 55', Prince 73'	5th
17 June 2017	Pattaya United	H	1–0	Renan 78' (pen.)	5th
24 June 2017	Nakhon Ratchasima Mazda	A	2–5	Prince 6', Renan 90+1'	6th
28 June 2017	SCG Muangthong United	A	1–3	Renan 32' (pen.)	6th
1 July 2017	Super Power Samut Prakan	A	4–1	Renan (2) 32', 63', Cunha 42', Nurul 55'	6th
5 July 2017	Sisaket	H	1–0	Cunha 13'	6th
8 July 2017	Ratchaburi Mitr Phol	A	1–5	Nurul 90+1'	6th
29 July 2017	Suphanburi	H	1–1	Kroekrit 57'	6th
5 August 2017	Bangkok United	A	2–7	Renan 64', Nurul 69'	6th
9 August 2017	Thai Honda Ladkrabang	H	5–0	Prince (2) 7', 59', Renan (2) 20', 66', Meedech 53' (o.g.)	6th
10 September 2017	Navy	A	2–2	Renan (2) 23', 59'	6th
20 September 2017	Port	A	3–1	Prince (2) 46', 84', Renan 80'	6th
24 September 2017	Ubon UMT United	H	1–1	Prince 16'	6th
14 October 2017	Chiangrai United	A	1–3	Prince 40'	7th
22 October 2017	Bangkok Glass	H	1–1	Worachit 66'	6th
8 November 2017	Sukhothai	A	1–3	Cunha 2'	7th
12 November 2017	BEC Tero Sasana	H	5–1	Renan 17' (pen.), Nurul 20', Worachit (2) 21', 74', Prince 43'	7th
18 November 2017	Buriram United	H	1–2	Renan 13' (pen.)	7th

Pos	Team	Pld	W	D	L	GF	GA	GD	Pts
5	Bangkok Glass	34	16	8	10	63	44	+19	56
6	Ratchaburi Mitr Phol	34	16	7	11	63	49	+14	55
7	Chonburi	34	15	8	11	59	59	0	53
8	Pattaya United	34	15	6	13	60	53	+7	51
9	Port	34	14	8	12	60	63	−3	50

Updated to match(es) played on 18 November 2017. Source: Thai League
Rules for classification: 1) Points; 2) Head-to-head points; 3) Head-to-head goals difference; 4) Head-to-head goals scored; 5) Overall goals difference; 6) Overall goals scored; 7) Fair play points; 8) Play-off without extra time;).

== Thai FA Cup ==
Date	Opponents	H / A	Result F–A	Scorers	Round
21 June 2017	Ayutthaya United	A	2–3	Nurul 35', Prince 44'	Round of 64

== Thai League Cup ==
Date	Opponents	H / A	Result F–A	Scorers	Round
26 July 2017	Chiangmai	A	http://www.thaileague.co.th/official/?r=Match/PrintPostMatchPDF&iMatchID=3576 (a.e.t.) (4–2p)	Cunha (2) 15', 90+3'	Round of 32
1 October 2017	Buriram United	H	http://www.thaileague.co.th/official/?r=Match/PrintPostMatchPDF&iMatchID=4044 (a.e.t.) (4–5p)	Nurul 86'	Round of 16

== Reserve team in Thai League 4 ==
Chonburi send the reserve team to compete in T4 Eastern Region as Chonburi B.

Date	Opponents	H / A	Result F–A	Scorers	League position
11 February 2017	Pattaya	H	2–0	Krit (2) 12', 50'	1st
18 February 2017	Marines Eureka	A	2–2	Krit 2', Thanongsak 88'	2nd
26 February 2017	Prachinburi United	A	0–2		5th
4 March 2017	Kabin United	H	0–3		10th
11 March 2017	Chanthaburi	H	0–0		7th
19 March 2017	Pluakdaeng Rayong United	A	3–1	Pipob (2) 17', 75', Karn 65'	6th
26 March 2017	Nakhon Nayok	H	0–0		6th
1 April 2017	Royal Thai Fleet	A	1–5	Kroekrit 57'	7th
9 April 2017	Bankhai United	H	5–2	Nattayot (2) 18', 79', Saharat 26', Kroekrit 64', Pipob 90'	5th
30 April 2017	Pattaya	A	6–2	Pipob (2) 8', 20', Nattayot (2) 22', 81', Prince 87', Autthagowit 90+2'	4th
7 May 2017	Marines Eureka	H	2–1	Autthagowit 28', Worachit 61' (pen.)	3rd
14 May 2017	Prachinburi United	H	4–1	Pipob (2) 2', 41', Autthagowit 17', Luís 27'	2nd
21 May 2017	Kabin United	A	2–1	Ritthidet Phensawat 70', Autthagowit 89'	2nd
28 May 2017	Chanthaburi	A	0–1		2nd
18 June 2017	Pluakdaeng Rayong United	H	4–1	Kritsada Kaman 19', Worachit 30', Settawut (2) 77', 90+2'	2nd
25 June 2017	Nakhon Nayok	A	1–1	Adisak 77'	3rd
2 July 2017	Royal Thai Fleet	H	0–0		3rd
9 July 2017	Bankhai United	A	0–4		3rd
16 July 2017	Pattaya	H	0–0		4th
23 July 2017	Marines Eureka	H	0–1		4th
30 July 2017	Prachinburi United	H	1–1	Settawut 57'	4th
6 August 2017	Kabin United	A	2–0	Noto 63', Thanongsak 80'	4th
12 August 2017	Chanthaburi	A	0–1		4th
19 August 2017	Pluakdaeng Rayong United	H	2–1	Nurul (2) 39', 87'	4th
27 August 2017	Nakhon Nayok	H	6–0	Cunha (2) 21', 28', Nattayot 30', Settawut (2) 58', 67', Alongkorn 72'	4th
2 September 2017	Royal Thai Fleet	A	2–2	Settawut 7', Fodé 74'	4th
10 September 2017	Bankhai United	A	1–1	Autthagowit 80'	5th

Pos	Team	Pld	W	D	L	GF	GA	GD	Pts
3	Pluakdaeng Rayong United	27	12	10	5	36	23	+13	46
4	Royal Thai Fleet	27	10	13	4	39	25	+14	43
5	Chonburi B	27	11	9	7	46	34	+12	42
6	Bankhai United	27	9	8	10	45	42	+3	35
7	Nakhon Nayok	27	6	11	10	25	46	−21	29

Updated to match(es) played on 20 October 2017. Source: Thai League 4
Rules for classification: 1) Points; 2) Head-to-head points; 3) Head-to-head goals difference; 4) Head-to-head goals scored; 5) Overall goals difference; 6) Overall goals scored; 7) Fair play points; 8) Play-off without extra time;).

== Squad statistics ==
Statistics accurate as of 19 February 2017.

No.	Pos.	Name	League		FA Cup		League Cup		Total	
No.	Pos.	Name	Apps	Goals	Apps	Goals	Apps	Goals	Apps	Goals
1	GK	(Thailand) Pattanan Pijittham	0	0	0	0	0	0	0	0
2	DF	(Thailand) Noppanon Kachaplayuk	2	0	0	0	0	0	2	0
3	DF	(Thailand) Heman Kittiampaiplurk	0	0	0	0	0	0	0	0
4	MF	(Thailand) Kroekrit Thaweekarn	2	0	0	0	0	0	2	0
5	DF	(Thailand) Suttinan Phuk-hom	0	0	0	0	0	0	0	0
6	DF	(Thailand) Alongkorn Prathumwong	1	0	0	0	0	0	1	0
7	MF	(Japan) Ryotaro Nakano	2	0	0	0	0	0	2	0
8	MF	(Thailand) Therdsak Chaiman (vc)	0	0	0	0	0	0	0	0
10	FW	(Thailand) Pipob On-Mo	0	0	0	0	0	0	0	0
11	FW	(Brazil) André Luís Leite	2	0	0	0	0	0	2	0
14	FW	(Brazil) Renan Marques	0(1)	0	0	0	0	0	0(1)	0
15	DF	(Thailand) Chayaphat Kitpongsrithada	1(1)	0	0	0	0	0	1(1)	0
17	MF	(Thailand) Phanuphong Phonsa	0(1)	0	0	0	0	0	0(1)	0
18	DF	(Ivory Coast) Fodé Diakité	2	1	0	0	0	0	2	1
20	FW	(Thailand) Saharat Sontisawat	0	0	0	0	0	0	0	0
21	MF	(Thailand) Prakit Deeprom	0	0	0	0	0	0	0	0
23	FW	(Thailand) Krit Phavaputanon	0	0	0	0	0	0	0	0
24	MF	(Thailand) Worachit Kanitsribampen	0(1)	0	0	0	0	0	0(1)	0
25	DF	(Thailand) Chonlatit Jantakam (c)	2	0	0	0	0	0	2	0
27	DF	(Thailand) Nattapon Malapun	0(1)	0	0	0	0	0	0(1)	0
29	FW	(Ghana) Prince Amponsah	2	0	0	0	0	0	2	0
30	GK	(Thailand) Chakhon Philakhlang	0	0	0	0	0	0	0	0
31	MF	(Thailand) Nurul Sriyankem	2	2	0	0	0	0	2	2
32	GK	(Thailand) Jirunpong Thammasiha	0	0	0	0	0	0	0	0
35	GK	(Thailand) Chanin Sae-ear	2	0	0	0	0	0	2	0
36	GK	(Thailand) Tanachai Noorach	0	0	0	0	0	0	0	0
37	DF	(Thailand) Jeerasak In-eiam	0	0	0	0	0	0	0	0
38	FW	(Thailand) Panudech Maiwong	0	0	0	0	0	0	0	0
40	FW	(Thailand) Adisak Srikampang	0(1)	0	0	0	0	0	0(1)	0
42	DF	(Thailand) Kritsada Kaman	0	0	0	0	0	0	0	0
47	DF	(Thailand) Karn Jorated	0	0	0	0	0	0	0	0
48	MF	(Thailand) Nattayot Pol-yiam	0	0	0	0	0	0	0	0
88	MF	(Thailand) Narong Jansawek	1	0	0	0	0	0	1	0

== Transfers ==
First Thai footballer's market is opening on 14 December 2016 to 28 January 2017
Second Thai footballer's market is opening on 3 June 2017 to 30 June 2017

=== In ===
Date	Pos.	Name	From
4 November 2016	DF	(Thailand) Heman Kittiampaiplurk	(Thailand) Bangkok
6 January 2017	FW	(Brazil) Renan Marques	(Thailand) Sukhothai
6 January 2017	FW	(Brazil) André Luís Leite	(Thailand) Navy
9 January 2017	MF	(Japan) Ryotaro Nakano	(Latvia) FK Jelgava
9 January 2017	GK	(Thailand) Pattanan Pijittham	(Thailand) Suphanburi
11 January 2017	DF	(Thailand) Chayaphat Kitpongsrithada	(Thailand) BEC Tero Sasana
20 January 2017	FW	(Thailand) Adisak Srikampang	(Thailand) Ubon UMT United
28 January 2017	DF	(Ivory Coast) Fodé Diakité	(Thailand) Phanthong
28 January 2017	GK	(Thailand) Jirunpong Thammasiha	(Thailand) Phanthong
28 January 2017	DF	(Thailand) Karn Jorated	(Thailand) Phanthong
12 June 2017	DF	(Thailand) Samart Panya	(Thailand) Navy

=== Out ===
Date	Pos.	Name	To
27 October 2016	DF	(Brazil) Anderson dos Santos	(Japan) Shimizu S-Pulse
6 November 2016	MF	(Thailand) Warut Supphaso	(Thailand) Sisaket
6 November 2016	FW	(Brazil) Rodrigo Vergilio	(Thailand) Navy
19 November 2016	FW	(Thailand) Wanit Chaisan	(Thailand) Sisaket
19 December 2016	FW	(Brazil) Leandro Assumpção	(Thailand) Sisaket
6 January 2017	MF	(Thailand) Pokklaw Anan	(Thailand) Bangkok United
28 January 2017	FW	(Thailand) Boonkerd Chaiyasin	(Thailand) Lampang
28 January 2017	DF	(Thailand) Tiwa Nueaket	Released
1 June 2017	MF	(Thailand) Prakit Deeprom	(Thailand) SCG Muangthong United

=== Loan in ===
Date from	Date to	Pos.	Name	From
29 October 2016	31 December 2017	DF	(Thailand) Nattapon Malapun	(Thailand) Buriram United

=== Loan out ===
Date from	Date to	Pos.	Name	To
9 January 2017	31 December 2017	FW	(Thailand) Sittichok Phaso	(Japan) Kagoshima United
