= 2021–22 Chonburi F.C. season =

Chonburi
2021–22 season
- Chairman: Wittaya Khunpluem
- Manager: Sasom Pobprasert
- Stadium: Chonburi Stadium, Mueang Chonburi, Chonburi, Thailand
- Thai League T1: -
- Thai FA Cup: -
- Thai League Cup: -
- Top goalscorer: League: – All: –

The 2021–22 season is Chonburi's 16th season in the Thai League T1 since 2006. The season was supposed to start on 31 July 2021 and concluded on 21 May 2022. Then, due to the situation of the COVID-19 pandemic is still severe, FA Thailand decided to postpone the season to start on 13 August 2021 instead. However, as it stands on 23 July 2021, the COVID-19's situation is getting even worse. Therefore, FA Thailand decided to postpone the opening day for the second time to start on 3 September 2021.

== Players ==
=== Current squad ===
As of 4 January 2022

Note: Flags indicate national team as defined under FIFA eligibility rules; some limited exceptions apply. Players may hold more than one non-FIFA nationality.

| No. | Pos. | Nation | Player |
|---|---|---|---|
| 2 | DF | THA | Noppanon Kachaplayuk |
| 3 | DF | THA | Chatmongkol Rueangthanarot |
| 5 | DF | THA | Kritsada Kaman (vice-captain) |
| 6 | MF | THA | Rangsan Wiroonsri |
| 7 | FW | KOR | Yoo Byung-soo |
| 10 | MF | THA | Kroekrit Thaweekarn (captain) |
| 11 | MF | BRU | Faiq Bolkiah |
| 15 | DF | MAS | Junior Eldstål |
| 16 | DF | THA | Anthonio Sanjairag |
| 18 | GK | THA | Tatpicha Aksornsri |
| 19 | MF | THA | Saharat Sontisawat |
| 22 | GK | THA | Thanakorn Waiyawut |
| 24 | MF | THA | Phanuphong Phonsa |
| 26 | MF | ISR | Gidi Kanyuk |

| No. | Pos. | Nation | Player |
|---|---|---|---|
| 28 | FW | BRA | Dennis Murillo |
| 29 | FW | THA | Chitsanupong Choti |
| 35 | GK | THA | Chanin Sae-ear |
| 43 | MF | THA | Rachata Moraksa |
| 45 | DF | THA | Jakkapong Sanmahung |
| 50 | DF | THA | Songchai Thongcham |
| 54 | MF | THA | Phitak Pimpae |
| 60 | MF | THA | Phanthamit Praphanth |
| 61 | FW | THA | Anuson Thaloengram |
| 65 | DF | THA | Bukkoree Lemdee |
| 75 | DF | THA | Sampan Kesi |
| 80 | GK | THA | Chommaphat Boonloet |
| 98 | DF | CRO | Renato Kelić (on loan from Buriram United) |

Note 1: The official club website lists the supporters as player 12th man. Note 2: Players who are AFC Champions League quota foreign players are listed in bold.

== Transfer ==
=== Pre-season transfer ===
==== In ====
| Position | Player | Transferred from | Ref |
|---|---|---|---|
| FW | (Brazil) Dennis Murillo | (Thailand) Nakhon Ratchasima F.C. | Undisclosed |
| MF | (Israel) Gidi Kanyuk | (Thailand) Nakhon Ratchasima F.C. | Undisclosed |
| FW | (South Korea) Yoo Byung-soo | (Thailand) Ayutthaya United F.C. | Undisclosed |
| DF | (Thailand) Anthonio Sanjairag | (Sweden) Djurgårdens IF Fotboll | Free |

==== Loan In ====
| Position | Player | Transferred from | Ref |
|---|---|---|---|
| DF | (Croatia) Renato Kelić | (Thailand) Buriram United F.C. | Season loan |

==== Out ====
| Position | Player | Transferred To | Ref |
|---|---|---|---|
| DF | (Thailand) Niran Hansson | (Thailand) Buriram United F.C. | Free |
| FW | (Brazil) Eliandro | (Thailand) Samut Prakan City F.C. | Free |
| FW | (Nigeria) Adefolarin Durosinmi | Unattached | End of contract |
| MF | (Thailand) Narathip Kruearanya | Unattached (Note: Later signed for Suphanburi F.C.) | End of contract |
| FW | (Bahrain) Jaycee John | Unattached | End of contract |
| GK | (Thailand) Sinthaweechai Hathairattanakool | (Thailand) Muangkan United F.C. | Free |
| DF | (Thailand) Thanaset Sujarit | (Thailand) Ratchaburi Mitr Phol F.C. | Undisclosed |
| MF | (Thailand) Nattawut Saengsri | (Thailand) Trat F.C. | Undisclosed |

==== Loan Out ====
| Position | Player | Transferred To | Ref |
|---|---|---|---|
| GK | (Thailand) Chakhon Philakhlang | (Thailand) Nakhon Si United F.C. | Season loan |
| FW | (Thailand) Warakorn Thongbai | (Thailand) Nongbua Pitchaya F.C. | Season loan |
| FW | (Thailand) Ritthidet Phensawat | (Thailand) Udon Thani F.C. | Season loan |
| GK | (Thailand) Anuchid Taweesri | (Thailand) Kanchanaburi F.C. | Season loan |
| MF | (Thailand) Pongsakorn Trisat | (Thailand) Uthai Thani F.C. | Season loan |
| MF | (Thailand) Kasidit Kalasin | (Thailand) Uthai Thani F.C. | Season loan |
| MF | (Thailand) Nititorn Sripraman | (Thailand) Songkhla F.C. | Season loan |
| MF | (Thailand) Nattawut Chootiwat | (Thailand) Songkhla F.C. | Season loan |
| MF | (Thailand) Anurak Suebsamut | (Thailand) Songkhla F.C. | Season loan |
| MF | (Thailand) Nattayot Pol-yiam | (Thailand) Muangkan United F.C. | Season loan |
| DF | (Thailand) Nattapong Chaidee | (Thailand) Uthai Thani F.C. | Season loan |
| GK | (Thailand) Worawut Sukuna | (Thailand) Uthai Thani F.C. | Season loan |
| MF | (Thailand) Narutchai Nimboon | (Thailand) Navy | Season loan |
| FW | (Thailand) Sittichok Paso | (Japan) FC Ryukyu | Season loan |
| FW | (Thailand) Teeratep Winothai | (Thailand) Police Tero F.C. | Season loan |
| MF | (Thailand) Teerapong Deehamhae | (Thailand) Pattaya Dolphins United F.C. | Season loan |
| MF | (Thailand) Sarawut Saowaros | (Thailand) Pattaya Dolphins United F.C. | Season loan |
| MF | (Thailand) Channarong Promsrikaew | (Spain) AD Unión Adarve | Season loan |
| MF | (Thailand) Panudech Maiwong | (Thailand) Phrae United F.C. | Season loan |

=== Mid-season transfer ===
==== In ====
| Position | Player | Transferred from | Ref |
|---|---|---|---|
| FW | (Brunei) Faiq Bolkiah | (Portugal) C.S. Marítimo B | Free |
| MF | (Thailand) Phanthamit Praphanth | (Thailand) Banbueng F.C. | Undisclosed |
| FW | (Thailand) Anuson Thaloengram | (Thailand) Banbueng F.C. | Undisclosed |
| GK | (Thailand) Chommaphat Boonloet | (Thailand) Banbueng F.C. | Undisclosed |
| DF | (Thailand) Kittikon Khetpara | (Thailand) Banbueng F.C. | Undisclosed |
| MF | (Thailand) Kittiphong Khetpara | (Thailand) Banbueng F.C. | Undisclosed |

==== Loan In ====
| Position | Player | Transferred from | Ref |

==== Out ====
| Position | Player | Transferred To | Ref |
|---|---|---|---|
| MF | (Thailand) Worachit Kanitsribampen | (Thailand) BG Pathum United F.C. | THB30m |

==== Loan Out ====
| Position | Player | Transferred To | Ref |
|---|---|---|---|
| DF | (Thailand) Nattayot Pol-yiam | (Thailand) Phrae United F.C. | Season loan |
| MF | (Thailand) Nattawut Chootiwat | (Thailand) STK Muangnont F.C. | Season loan |
| GK | (Thailand) Sarut Nasri | (Thailand) PT Prachuap F.C. | Season loan |
| DF | (Thailand) Kittikon Khetpara | (Thailand) Nakhon Si United F.C. | Season loan |
| MF | (Thailand) Kittiphong Khetpara | (Thailand) Nakhon Si United F.C. | Season loan |

== Competitions ==
=== Overview ===
| Competition | First match | Last match | Starting round | Final position | Record | | | | | | | |
| Competition | First match | Last match | Starting round | Final position | Pld | W | D | L | GF | GA | GD | Win % |
|---|---|---|---|---|---|---|---|---|---|---|---|---|
| Thai League | 5 September 2021 | 21 May 2022 | Matchday 1 | | 17 | 8 | 5 | 4 | 32 | 19 | +13 | 47.06 |
| FA Cup | 27 October 2021 | 24 November 2021 | First Round | Second Round | 2 | 1 | 0 | 1 | 5 | 2 | +3 | 50.00 |
| League Cup | 12 January 2022 | | First Round | | 1 | 1 | 0 | 0 | 1 | 0 | +1 | 100.00 |
| Total | | | | | 20 | 10 | 5 | 5 | 38 | 21 | +17 | 50.00 |

Last updated: 15 January 2022
Source: Competitions

=== Thai League 1 ===
==== League table ====
| Pos | Team | Pld | W | D | L | GF | GA | GD | Pts |
|---|---|---|---|---|---|---|---|---|---|
| 5 | Chiangrai United | 30 | 13 | 8 | 9 | 33 | 35 | −2 | 47 |
| 6 | Nongbua Pitchaya | 30 | 13 | 8 | 9 | 42 | 35 | +7 | 47 |
| 7 | Chonburi | 30 | 12 | 8 | 10 | 50 | 40 | +10 | 44 |
| 8 | Port | 30 | 11 | 6 | 13 | 41 | 37 | +4 | 39 |
| 9 | Nakhon Ratchasima | 30 | 10 | 7 | 13 | 33 | 47 | −14 | 37 |

Updated to match(es) played on 4 May 2022. Source: Thai League
Rules for classification: 1) Points; 2) Head-to-head points; 3) Head-to-head goals difference; 4) Head-to-head goals scored; 5) Overall goals difference; 6) Overall goals scored; 7) Fair play points; 8) Play-off without extra time;).

==== Results summary ====
| Overall | | | | | | | | Home | | | | | | Away | | | | | |
| Pld | W | D | L | GF | GA | GD | Pts | W | D | L | GF | GA | GD | W | D | L | GF | GA | GD |
|---|---|---|---|---|---|---|---|---|---|---|---|---|---|---|---|---|---|---|---|
| 17 | 8 | 5 | 4 | 32 | 19 | +13 | 29 | 5 | 3 | 1 | 16 | 8 | +8 | 3 | 2 | 3 | 16 | 11 | +5 |

==== Results by matchday ====
| Matchday | 1 | 2 | 3 | 4 | 5 | 6 | 7 | 8 | 9 | 10 | 11 | 12 | 13 | 14 | 15 | 16 | 17 | 18 |
|---|---|---|---|---|---|---|---|---|---|---|---|---|---|---|---|---|---|---|
| Ground | H | A | H | A | H | A | H | A | H | A | H | A | H | A | H | H | A | H |
| Result | D | D | W | W | L | L | W | L | D | W | W | W | W | D | W | D | L | |
| Position | 11 | 10 | 3 | 1 | 2 | 5 | 4 | 7 | 7 | 5 | 4 | 4 | 4 | 4 | 3 | 3 | | |

A = Away; H = Home; W = Win; D = Draw; L = Loss

==== Matches ====
Win Draw Loss

| 5 September 2021 1 | Chonburi | 1–1 | BG Pathum United | Chonburi |
| | Dennis 68' (pen.) | | Diogo 17'; Yordrak (red card) 69' | Stadium: Chonburi Stadium; Attendance: 0 Referee: Winat Phophat |

| 12 September 2021 2 | Muangthong United | 3–3 | Chonburi | Nonthaburi |
| | Popp 72'; Picha 76'; Adisak 83' (pen.) | | Yoo 23'; Worachit 58'; Kanyuk 69' | Stadium: Thunderdome Stadium; Referee: Anusorn Nookaew |

| 18 September 2021 3 | Chonburi | 3–1 | Nongbua Pitchaya | Chonburi |
| | Dennis 21' 45+2' (pen.); Settawut 84' | | Rahmani 12' | Stadium: Chonburi Stadium; Attendance: 0 Referee: Niwat Insa-ard |

| 25 September 2021 4 | Khonkaen United | 0–7 | Chonburi | Khon Kaen |
| | Cobo (red card) 40' | | Dennis 11' (pen.) 45+2' 52' 54'; Worachit 24' 50' 82' | Stadium: Khon Kaen Stadium; Attendance: 1,625; Referee: Sivakorn Pu-udom |

| 1 October 2021 5 | Chonburi | 2–3 | Leo Chiangrai United | Khon Kaen |
| | Kritsada 42'; Kroekrit 45+2'; Eldstål (red card) 66' | | Bill 1' 64' (pen.) 87' | Stadium: Khon Kaen Stadium; Attendance: 1,425; Referee: Chaireag Ngam-som |

| 5 October 2021 6 | Police Tero | 2–0 | Chonburi | Bangkok |
| | Jenphob 10' 25' | | | Stadium: Boonyachinda Stadium; Attendance: 0 Referee: Paisan Bendem-alee |

| 10 October 2021 7 | Chonburi | 1–0 | Suphanburi | Chonburi |
| | Kelić 83' | | Suwannapat (yellow card) 71' (yellow-red card) 80' | Stadium: Chonburi Stadium; Attendance: 2,030; Referee: Panumas Phansamo |

| 17 October 2021 8 | True Bangkok United | 1–0 | Chonburi | Pathum Thani |
| | Vander 65' | | | Stadium: Thammasat Stadium; Attendance: 0 Referee: Songkran Bunmeekiart |

| 23 October 2021 9 | Chonburi | 1–1 | Chiangmai United | Chonburi |
| | Kanyuk 38' | | de Leeuw 5' | Stadium: Chonburi Stadium; Attendance: 1,980; Referee: Paisan Bendem-alee |

| 31 October 2021 10 | Port | 1–2 | Chonburi | Bangkok |
| | Rochela 27' | | Eldstål 48'; Worachit 90+4' | Stadium: PAT Stadium; Attendance: 1,313; Referee: Sarayut Jakngoen |

| 7 November 2021 11 | Chonburi | 2–1 | Samut Prakan City | Chonburi |
| | Kelić 14'; Kroekrit 20' | | Jiraaut 29' | Stadium: Chonburi Stadium; Attendance: 2,974; Referee: Teetichai Nualjan |

| 10 November 2021 12 | PT Prachuap | 1–2 | Chonburi | Prachuap Khiri Khan |
| | Eakkanut 86'; Willen (red card) 73' | | Kanyuk 45+3'; Worachit 90+5' | Stadium: Sam Ao Stadium; Attendance: 426; Referee: Phairot Bunkamnoed |

| 13 November 2021 13 | Chonburi | 2–0 | Buriram United | Chonburi |
| | Dennis 75' (pen.); Worachit 90+5' | | | Stadium: Chonburi Stadium; Attendance: 4,120; Referee: Chaireag Ngam-som |

| 20 November 2021 14 | Nakhon Ratchasima | 0–0 | Chonburi | Nakhon Ratchasima |
| | | | | Stadium: 80th Birthday Stadium; Attendance: 2,944; Referee: Winat Phophat |

| 28 November 2021 15 | Chonburi | 3–0 | Ratchaburi Mitr Phol | Chonburi |
| | Yoo 28' 79'; Worachit 66' | | | Stadium: Chonburi Stadium; Attendance: 3,520; Referee: Sarayut Jakngoen |

| 8 January 2022 16 | Chonburi | 1–1 | Muangthong United | Chonburi |
| | Kelić 51' | | Mirzaev 41' | Stadium: Chonburi Stadium; Attendance: 3,204; Referee: Sahapop Sriboonlue |

| 15 January 2022 17 | Nongbua Pitchaya | 3–2 | Chonburi | Nong Bua Lamphu |
| | Eid 12'; Tardeli 36'; Tassanapong 89' | | Phitak 16'; Yoo 65' | Stadium: Pitchaya Stadium; Attendance: 2,124; Referee: Winat Phophat |

| 23 January 2022 18 | Chonburi | v | Khonkaen United | Chonburi |
| | | | | Stadium: Chonburi Stadium |

=== Thai FA Cup ===
==== Matches ====
Win Draw Loss

| 27 October 2021 First Round | Chonburi (T1) | 4–0 | Udon Thani (T2) | Chonburi |
| | Kelić 57'; Rangsan 63'; Chitsanupong 88'; Phitak 90+1' | | | Stadium: Chonburi Stadium; Attendance: 1,521; Referee: Vitsavet Sangnakorn |

| 24 November 2021 Second Round | Chiangmai United (T1) | 2–1 | Chonburi (T1) | Chiang Mai |
| | Kritsada 39' (o.g.); Saharat 48' | | Kanyuk 88' | Stadium: 700th Anniversary Stadium; Attendance: 1,249; Referee: Noppadet Mangngam |

=== Thai League Cup ===
==== Matches ====
Win Draw Loss

| 12 January 2022 First round | Chiangmai (T2) | 0–1 | Chonburi (T1) | Chiang Mai |
| | | | Yoo 81' | Stadium: Chiang Mai Municipality Stadium; Attendance: 714; Referee: Chaireag Ngam-som |

| 9 February 2022 Second round | Muang Loei United (T3) | 1–3 | Chonburi (T1) | Mueang, Loei |
| 15:00 (UTC+7) | Nattapon Thaptanon 46' | | Kroekrit Thaweekarn 44'; Dennis Murillo 89', 90+4' | Stadium: Blue Dragon Mueang Loei Stadium; Attendance: 365; Referee: Chaireag Ngam-som |

| 13 March 2022 Quarter-final | Bangkok United (T1) | 0–1 (a.e.t.) | Chonburi (T1) | Khlong Luang, Pathum Thani |
| 18:00 (UTC+7) | | | Yoo Byung-soo 98' | Stadium: Thammasat Stadium; Attendance: 2,279; Referee: Niwat Insa-ard |

| 25 May 2022 Semi-final | Chonburi (T1) | 0–1 | PT Prachuap (T1) | Khlong Luang, Pathum Thani |
| 18:00 (UTC+7) | | | Willen 64' | Stadium: Thammasat Stadium; Attendance: 1,877; Referee: Mongkolchai Pechsri |

== Team statistics ==
=== Appearances and goals ===
As of 15 January 2022

| No. | Pos. | Player | League | | FA Cup | | League Cup | | Total | |
| No. | Pos. | Player | Apps. | Goals | Apps. | Goals | Apps. | Goals | Apps. | Goals |
|---|---|---|---|---|---|---|---|---|---|---|
| 2 | DF | (Thailand) Noppanon Kachaplayuk | 7+3 | 0 | 0+1 | 0 | 1 | 0 | 8+4 | 0 |
| 3 | DF | (Thailand) Chatmongkol Rueangthanarot | 16+1 | 0 | 1 | 0 | 1 | 0 | 18+1 | 0 |
| 5 | MF | (Thailand) Kritsada Kaman | 17 | 1 | 1+1 | 0 | 1 | 0 | 19+1 | 1 |
| 6 | MF | (Thailand) Rangsan Wiroonsri | 5+4 | 0 | 2 | 1 | 0+1 | 0 | 7+5 | 1 |
| 7 | FW | (South Korea) Yoo Byung-soo | 12+5 | 4 | 0 | 0 | 1 | 1 | 13+5 | 5 |
| 10 | MF | (Thailand) Kroekrit Thaweekarn | 11+5 | 2 | 2 | 0 | 1 | 0 | 14+5 | 2 |
| 11 | MF | (Brunei) Faiq Bolkiah | 0+2 | 0 | 0 | 0 | 0 | 0 | 0+2 | 0 |
| 15 | DF | (Malaysia) Junior Eldstål | 15 | 1 | 1 | 0 | 0 | 0 | 16 | 1 |
| 16 | DF | (Thailand) Anthonio Sanjairag | 0+3 | 0 | 0 | 0 | 0 | 0 | 0+3 | 0 |
| 18 | GK | (Thailand) Tatpicha Aksornsri | 1+1 | 0 | 2 | 0 | 0 | 0 | 3+1 | 0 |
| 19 | MF | (Thailand) Saharat Sontisawat | 6+6 | 0 | 1+1 | 0 | 1 | 0 | 8+7 | 0 |
| 22 | GK | (Thailand) Thanakorn Waiyawut | 0 | 0 | 0 | 0 | 0 | 0 | 0 | 0 |
| 24 | MF | (Thailand) Phanuphong Phonsa | 2+3 | 0 | 1 | 0 | 0 | 0 | 3+3 | 0 |
| 26 | MF | (Israel) Gidi Kanyuk | 17 | 3 | 1+1 | 1 | 1 | 0 | 19+1 | 4 |
| 27 | FW | (Thailand) Settawut Wongsai | 1+10 | 1 | 1 | 0 | 0 | 0 | 2+10 | 1 |
| 28 | FW | (Brazil) Dennis Murillo | 16+1 | 8 | 1+1 | 0 | 0 | 0 | 17+2 | 8 |
| 29 | MF | (Thailand) Chitsanupong Choti | 0+11 | 0 | 1+1 | 1 | 0+1 | 0 | 1+13 | 1 |
| 35 | GK | (Thailand) Chanin Sae-ear | 16 | 0 | 0 | 0 | 1 | 0 | 17 | 0 |
| 43 | MF | (Thailand) Rachata Moraksa | 0 | 0 | 0 | 0 | 0+1 | 0 | 0+1 | 0 |
| 45 | DF | (Thailand) Jakkapong Sanmahung | 1+3 | 0 | 2 | 0 | 0+1 | 0 | 3+4 | 0 |
| 50 | DF | (Thailand) Songchai Thongcham | 7+6 | 0 | 1+1 | 0 | 1 | 0 | 9+7 | 0 |
| 51 | DF | (Thailand) Tawan Chanthasen | 0 | 0 | 0 | 0 | 0 | 0 | 0 | 0 |
| 54 | MF | (Thailand) Phitak Pimpae | 2+3 | 1 | 1+1 | 1 | 1 | 0 | 4+4 | 2 |
| 60 | MF | (Thailand) Phanthamit Praphanth | 0 | 0 | 0 | 0 | 0 | 0 | 0 | 0 |
| 61 | FW | (Thailand) Anuson Thaloengram | 0 | 0 | 0 | 0 | 0 | 0 | 0 | 0 |
| 63 | MF | (Thailand) Kroekphon Phondongdok | 0 | 0 | 0 | 0 | 0 | 0 | 0 | 0 |
| 65 | DF | (Thailand) Bukkoree Lemdee | 7+1 | 0 | 1 | 0 | 0 | 0 | 8+1 | 0 |
| 75 | DF | (Thailand) Sampan Kesi | 0+5 | 0 | 0+1 | 0 | 0 | 0 | 0+6 | 0 |
| 80 | GK | (Thailand) Chommaphat Boonloet | 0 | 0 | 0 | 0 | 0 | 0 | 0 | 0 |
| 98 | DF | (Croatia) Renato Kelić | 15 | 3 | 2 | 1 | 1 | 0 | 18 | 4 |
Players loaned out / left during season
| 8 | MF | (Thailand) Worachit Kanitsribampen | 13+2 | 8 | 0+1 | 0 | 0 | 0 | 13+3 | 8 |
| 17 | GK | (Thailand) Sarut Nasri | 0+1 | 0 | 0 | 0 | 0 | 0 | 0+1 | 0 |

== Overall summary ==
=== Season summary ===
| Games played | 20 (17 Thai League, 2 FA Cup, 1 League Cup) |
| Games won | 10 (8 Thai League, 1 FA Cup, 1 League Cup) |
| Games drawn | 5 (5 Thai League, 0 FA Cup, 0 League Cup) |
| Games lost | 5 (4 Thai League, 1 FA Cup, 0 League Cup) |
| Goals scored | 38 (32 Thai League, 5 FA Cup, 1 League Cup) |
| Goals conceded | 21 (19 Thai League, 2 FA Cup, 0 League Cup) |
| Goal difference | +17 |
| Clean sheets | 7 (5 Thai League, 1 FA Cup, 1 League Cup) |
| Best result | 7–0 vs Khon Kaen United (25 September 21) |
| Worst result | 0–2 vs Police Tero (6 October 21) |
| Most appearances | 2 players (20) |
| Top scorer | 2 players (8) |
| Points | 29 |

=== Score overview ===
| Opposition | Home score | Away score | Double |
|---|---|---|---|
| BG Pathum United | 1–1 | | No |
| Buriram United | 2–0 | | |
| Chiangmai United | 1–1 | | No |
| Khon Kaen United | | 0–7 | |
| Leo Chiangrai United | 2–3 | | No |
| Muangthong United | 1–1 | 3–3 | No |
| Nakhon Ratchasima | | 0–0 | No |
| Nongbua Pitchaya | 3–1 | 3–2 | No |
| Police Tero | | 2–0 | No |
| Port | | 1–2 | |
| PT Prachuap | | 1–2 | |
| Ratchaburi Mitr Phol | 3–0 | | |
| Samut Prakan City | 2–1 | | |
| Suphanburi | 1–0 | | |
| True Bangkok United | | 1–0 | No |
