= Sitthikorn Klamsai =

Thai footballer

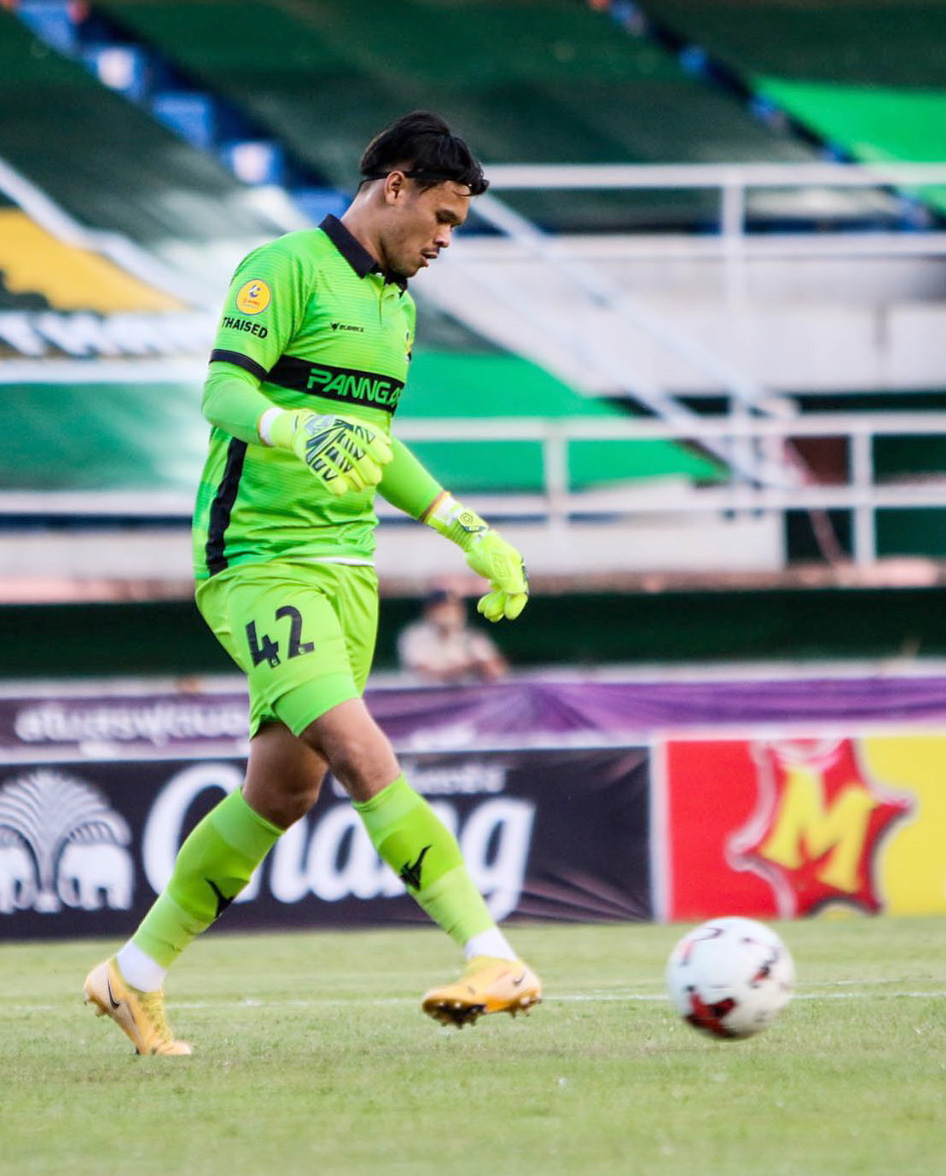
- Sitthikorn Klamsai playing for Uthai Thani.

Personal information
- Full name: Sitthikorn Klamsai
- Date of birth: 24 July 1996 (age 30)
- Place of birth: Bangkok, Thailand
- Height: 1.76 m (5 ft 9 1/2 in)
- Position: Goalkeeper

Youth career
- 2010–2012: Ratwinit Bangkaeo School
- 2012–2015: Buriram United

Senior career*
Years	Team	Apps	(Gls)
2015–2016	Buriram United	0	(0)
2017–2018	Ubon UMT United	19	(0)
2018–2019	Samut Sakhon	4	(0)
2020–2022	Uthai Thani	12	(0)
2022–2023	Customs United		
- * Club domestic league appearances and goals as of 24 April 2022

Sitthikorn Klamsai (Thai: สิทธิกร กล่ำใส, born July 24, 1996), is a Thai professional footballer who plays as a goalkeeper.

== Honours ==
=== Club ===
Uthai Thani

- Thai League 3 (1): 2021–22
- Thai League 3 Northern Region (1): 2021–22
