= 2012 AFF Championship =

2012 Kejohanan Bola Sepak ASEAN 2012 อาเซียนฟุตบอลแชมเปียนชิพ

Tournament details
- Host country: Malaysia; Thailand (for group stage)
- Dates: 24 November – 22 December
- Teams: 8 (from 1 sub-confederation)
- Venues: 4 (in 3 host cities)

Final positions
- Champions: Singapore (4th title)
- Runners-up: Thailand

Tournament statistics
- Matches played: 18
- Goals scored: 48 (2.67 per match)
- Top scorer(s): (Thailand) Teerasil Dangda (5 goals)
- Best player: (Singapore) Shahril Ishak
- Fair play award: Malaysia

The 2012 AFF Championship, sponsored by Suzuki and officially known as the 2012 AFF Suzuki Cup, was the 9th edition of the AFF Championship, the football championship of Southeast Asia. It was co-hosted for group stage by Malaysia and Thailand and took place from 24 November to 22 December 2012.

Malaysia were the defending champions but were eliminated by Thailand in the semi-finals. Singapore became the first side to win the AFF Championship four times, beating Thailand 3–2 on aggregate in the finals. Singapore coach Radojko Avramović also became the most successful coach in tournament history, adding to his wins in 2004 and 2007.

== Hosts ==
On 17 December 2010, the Philippine Football Federation declared their interest to host the 2012 AFF Championship. However, with no other reported interest and following the meeting of the AFF Council on 19 February 2011, Malaysia and Thailand were announced as hosts of the group stage.

== Venues ==
There were two main venues; the Bukit Jalil National Stadium in Kuala Lumpur and the Rajamangala Stadium in Bangkok. The secondary venues; the Shah Alam Stadium in Shah Alam, Selangor State and the Supachalasai Stadium in Bangkok for the final round of group games on 30 November and 1 December. The Supachalasai Stadium replaced the Muang Thong Stadium as the alternative venue for the final match day in Group A on 27 November, after itself had been replaced by the Muang Thong Stadium on 17 October. If Thailand reached the semifinals and finals, their home games were played at the Supachalasai Stadium as the Rajamangala was hosting the 2012 Race of Champions. Philippines and Singapore also hosted games due to making the knockout stages. The Philippines hosted at the Rizal Memorial Stadium in Manila, the first time an AFF Championship game was held in the Philippines and Singapore hosted at the Jalan Besar Stadium.

(Malaysia) Kuala Lumpur	Location of stadiums of the 2014 AFF Championship. Orange: Finals, Semi-finals and Group Stage; Red: Finals and Semi-finals; Blue: Semi-finals; Green: Semi-finals and Group Stage; Yellow: Group Stage.	(Malaysia) Shah Alam
Bukit Jalil National Stadium	Location of stadiums of the 2014 AFF Championship. Orange: Finals, Semi-finals and Group Stage; Red: Finals and Semi-finals; Blue: Semi-finals; Green: Semi-finals and Group Stage; Yellow: Group Stage.	Shah Alam Stadium
Capacity: 110,000	Location of stadiums of the 2014 AFF Championship. Orange: Finals, Semi-finals and Group Stage; Red: Finals and Semi-finals; Blue: Semi-finals; Green: Semi-finals and Group Stage; Yellow: Group Stage.	Capacity: 80,372
Bukit Jalil National Stadium	Location of stadiums of the 2014 AFF Championship. Orange: Finals, Semi-finals and Group Stage; Red: Finals and Semi-finals; Blue: Semi-finals; Green: Semi-finals and Group Stage; Yellow: Group Stage.	Shah Alam Stadium
(Thailand) Bangkok	Location of stadiums of the 2014 AFF Championship. Orange: Finals, Semi-finals and Group Stage; Red: Finals and Semi-finals; Blue: Semi-finals; Green: Semi-finals and Group Stage; Yellow: Group Stage.	(Thailand) Bangkok
Rajamangala Stadium	Location of stadiums of the 2014 AFF Championship. Orange: Finals, Semi-finals and Group Stage; Red: Finals and Semi-finals; Blue: Semi-finals; Green: Semi-finals and Group Stage; Yellow: Group Stage.	Supachalasai Stadium
Capacity: 49,722	Location of stadiums of the 2014 AFF Championship. Orange: Finals, Semi-finals and Group Stage; Red: Finals and Semi-finals; Blue: Semi-finals; Green: Semi-finals and Group Stage; Yellow: Group Stage.	Capacity: 19,793
Rajamangala Stadium	Location of stadiums of the 2014 AFF Championship. Orange: Finals, Semi-finals and Group Stage; Red: Finals and Semi-finals; Blue: Semi-finals; Green: Semi-finals and Group Stage; Yellow: Group Stage.	National Stadium (Thailand)
(Philippines) Manila	Location of stadiums of the 2014 AFF Championship. Orange: Finals, Semi-finals and Group Stage; Red: Finals and Semi-finals; Blue: Semi-finals; Green: Semi-finals and Group Stage; Yellow: Group Stage.	Singapore
Rizal Memorial Stadium	Location of stadiums of the 2014 AFF Championship. Orange: Finals, Semi-finals and Group Stage; Red: Finals and Semi-finals; Blue: Semi-finals; Green: Semi-finals and Group Stage; Yellow: Group Stage.	Jalan Besar Stadium
Capacity: 12,873	Location of stadiums of the 2014 AFF Championship. Orange: Finals, Semi-finals and Group Stage; Red: Finals and Semi-finals; Blue: Semi-finals; Green: Semi-finals and Group Stage; Yellow: Group Stage.	Capacity: 8,000
Rizal Memorial Stadium	Location of stadiums of the 2014 AFF Championship. Orange: Finals, Semi-finals and Group Stage; Red: Finals and Semi-finals; Blue: Semi-finals; Green: Semi-finals and Group Stage; Yellow: Group Stage.	Jalan Besar Stadium

== Qualification ==
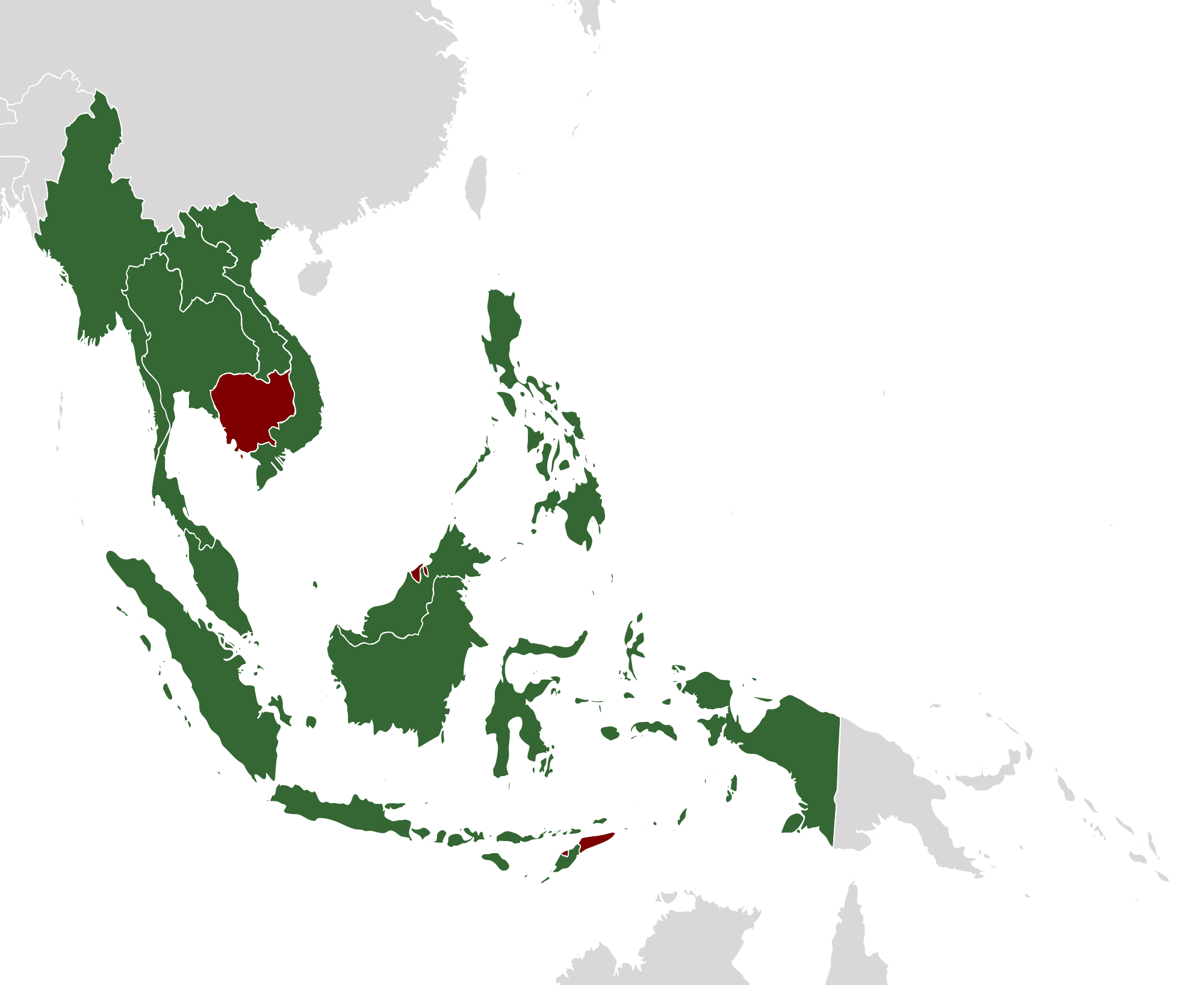
Qualified Teams. Teams Did not qualify.

Qualification took place from 5 to 13 October 2012. It involved the five lower ranked teams in Southeast Asia. All teams played in a round-robin tournament format with the top two teams qualifying for the tournament proper. Six teams have qualified directly to the finals.

- Indonesia
- Laos (Qualification runners-up)
- Malaysia
- Myanmar (Qualification winners)
- Philippines
- Singapore
- Thailand
- Vietnam

== Draw ==
The draw for the tournament as well as the qualification tournament took place on the afternoon of 11 July 2012 at the Golden Tulip Hotel in Bangkok. The teams that qualified via the qualifying stages were not yet determined at the time of the draw. The eight finalists were divided into four pots of two teams each based on team rankings.

Pot 1	Pot 2	Pot 3	Pot 4
Malaysia (co-host); Thailand (co-host)	Vietnam; Indonesia	Singapore; Philippines	Qualification winner – Myanmar; Qualification runner-up – Laos

== Group stage ==
Key to colours in group tables
Top two placed teams advanced to the semi-finals

=== Tie-breaking criteria ===
Ranking in each group was determined as follows:

1. Greater number of points obtained in all the group matches;
2. Goal difference in all the group matches;
3. Greater number of goals scored in all the group matches.

If two or more teams were equal on the basis on the above three criteria, the placement was determined as follows:

1. Result of the direct match between the teams concerned;
2. Drawing of lots by the Organising Committee.

However, these criteria did not apply if two teams tied on points, goals scored, and conceded played against each other in their final group match, were still level at the end of that match, and no other team in group finished with same points; in that case, the tie was broken by a penalty shoot-out.

=== Group A ===
- All matches were played in Thailand.
- Times listed are UTC+7.

Team	Pld	W	D	L	GF	GA	GD	Pts
Thailand (H)	3	3	0	0	9	2	+7	9
Philippines	3	2	0	1	4	2	+2	6
Vietnam	3	0	1	2	2	5	−3	1
Myanmar	3	0	1	2	1	7	−6	1

(H) Hosts
24 November 2012
17:30

Vietnam	1–1	Myanmar
Lê Tấn Tài 34'	Report	Kyi Lin 53' (pen.)

Rajamangala Stadium, Bangkok
Referee: Andre El Haddad (Lebanon)
24 November 2012
20:20

Thailand	2–1	Philippines
Jakkraphan 39'; Anucha 41'	Report	Mulders 77'

Rajamangala Stadium, Bangkok
Referee: Ryuji Sato (Japan)

27 November 2012
17:30

Vietnam	0–1	Philippines
	Report	Caligdong 86'

Rajamangala Stadium, Bangkok
Referee: Ma Ning (China PR)
27 November 2012
20:20

Myanmar	0–4	Thailand
	Report	Teerasil 20', 82', 89'; Apipoo 59'

Rajamangala Stadium, Bangkok
Referee: Yaqoob Abdul Baki (Oman)

30 November 2012
20:20

Philippines	2–0	Myanmar
P. Younghusband 47'; Á. Guirado 90+4'	Report

Supachalasai Stadium, Bangkok
Referee: Yaqoob Abdul Baki (Oman)
30 November 2012
20:20

Thailand	3–1	Vietnam
Kirati 21', 65'; Nguyễn Gia Từ 82' (o.g.)	Report	Nguyễn Văn Quyết 72'

Rajamangala Stadium, Bangkok
Referee: Ryuji Sato (Japan)

=== Group B ===
- All matches were played in Malaysia.
- Times listed are UTC+8.

Team	Pld	W	D	L	GF	GA	GD	Pts
Singapore	3	2	0	1	7	4	+3	6
Malaysia (H)	3	2	0	1	6	4	+2	6
Indonesia	3	1	1	1	3	4	−1	4
Laos	3	0	1	2	6	10	−4	1

(H) Hosts
25 November 2012
18:00

Indonesia	2–2	Laos
Maitimo 43'; Vendry 90'	Report	Khampheng 30' (pen.); Keoviengphet 80'

Bukit Jalil National Stadium, Kuala Lumpur
Referee: Ng Kai Lam (Hong Kong)
25 November 2012
20:45

Malaysia	0–3	Singapore
	Report	Shahril 32', 38'; Đurić 75'

Bukit Jalil National Stadium, Kuala Lumpur
Referee: Valentin Kovalenko (Uzbekistan)

28 November 2012
18:00

Indonesia	1–0	Singapore
Andik 88'	Report

Bukit Jalil National Stadium, Kuala Lumpur
Referee: Ali Abdulnabi (Bahrain)
28 November 2012
20:45

Laos	1–4	Malaysia
Khonesavanh 38'	Report	Safiq 15'; Safee 67'; Zack 76'; Khyril 80'

Bukit Jalil National Stadium, Kuala Lumpur
Referee: Fan Qi (China PR)

1 December 2012
20:45

Singapore	4–3	Laos
Shahril 45+1', 52'; Khairul 63'; Fazrul 65'	Report	Khampheng 21', 81' (pen.); Keoviengphet 40'

Shah Alam Stadium, Shah Alam
Referee: Ng Kai Lam (Hong Kong)
1 December 2012
20:45

Malaysia	2–0	Indonesia
Azamuddin 27'; Mahali 29'	Report

Bukit Jalil National Stadium, Kuala Lumpur
Referee: Valentin Kovalenko (Uzbekistan)

== Knockout stage ==
=== Bracket ===
Semi-finals
A2	Philippines	0	0	0
B1	Singapore	0	1	1
B2	Malaysia	1	0	1
A1	Thailand	1	2	3

Final
B1	Singapore	3	0	3
A1	Thailand	1	1	2

=== Semi-finals ===
First legs

8 December 2012
20:00 UTC+8

Philippines	0–0	Singapore
	Report

Rizal Memorial Stadium, Manila
Referee: Abdullah Al Hilali (Oman)
9 December 2012
20:00 UTC+8

Malaysia	1–1	Thailand
Norshahrul 48'	Report	Teerasil 78'

Bukit Jalil National Stadium, Kuala Lumpur
Referee: Mohsen Torky (Iran)

Second legs

12 December 2012
20:00 UTC+8

Singapore	1–0	Philippines
Khairul 19'	Report

Jalan Besar Stadium, Singapore
Referee: Tan Hai (China PR)

Singapore won 1–0 on aggregate.

13 December 2012
19:00 UTC+7

Thailand	2–0	Malaysia
Teerasil 60'; Theerathon 65'	Report

Supachalasai Stadium, Bangkok
Referee: Lee Min-Hu (South Korea)

Thailand won 3–1 on aggregate.

=== Final ===
First leg

19 December 2012
20:00 UTC+8

Singapore	3–1	Thailand
Fahrudin 10' (pen.); Khairul 61'; Baihakki 90+1'	Report	Adul 59'

Jalan Besar Stadium, Singapore
Referee: Masaaki Toma (Japan)

Second leg

22 December 2012
19:00 UTC+7

Thailand	1–0	Singapore
Kirati 45'	Report

Supachalasai Stadium, Bangkok
Referee: Ravshan Irmatov (Uzbekistan)

Singapore won 3–2 on aggregate.

== Awards ==
2012 AFF Championship champion

Singapore
Fourth title

Most Valuable Player	Golden Boot	Fair Play Award
(Singapore) Shahril Ishak	(Thailand) Teerasil Dangda	Malaysia

== Player statistics ==
=== Discipline ===
In the final tournament, a player was suspended for the subsequent match in the competition for either getting red card or accumulating two yellow cards in two different matches.

Player	Offences	Suspensions
(Indonesia) Endra Prasetya	(red card) in Group B v Laos	Group B v Singapore
(Laos) Sopha Saysana	(red card) in Group B v Indonesia	Group B v Malaysia
(Singapore) Irwan Shah	(yellow card) (yellow-red card) in Group B v Indonesia	Group B v Laos
(Thailand) Pichitphong Choeichiu	(yellow card) in Group A v Philippines; (yellow card) in Group A v Myanmar	Group A v Vietnam
(Vietnam) Âu Văn Hoàn	(yellow card) in Group A v Myanmar; (yellow card) in Group A v Thailand	
(Vietnam) Lê Tấn Tài	(yellow card) in Group A v Philippines; (yellow card) in Group A v Thailand	
(Singapore) Hariss Harun	(yellow card) in Group B v Malaysia; (yellow card) in Group B v Indonesia	Group B v Laos
(Indonesia) Wahyu Wijiastanto	(yellow card) in Group B v Laos; (yellow card) in Group B v Singapore	Group B v Malaysia
(Indonesia) Muhammad Taufiq	(yellow card) in Group B v Singapore; (yellow card) in Group B v Malaysia	
(Indonesia) Oktovianus Maniani	(yellow card) in Group B v Singapore; (yellow card) in Group B v Malaysia	
(Thailand) Arthit Sunthornpit	(red card) in Group A v Vietnam	Semi-finals (1st Leg) v Malaysia

• Player who get a card during the semifinals and final doesn't include here.

=== Goalscorers ===
5 goals

- (Thailand) Teerasil Dangda

4 goals

- (Singapore) Shahril Ishak

3 goals

- (Laos) Khampheng Sayavutthi
- (Singapore) Khairul Amri
- (Thailand) Kirati Keawsombat

2 goals

- (Laos) Keoviengphet Liththideth

1 goal

- (Indonesia) Andik Vermansyah
- (Indonesia) Raphael Maitimo
- (Indonesia) Vendry Mofu
- (Laos) Khonesavanh Sihavong
- (Malaysia) Azamuddin Akil
- (Malaysia) Khyril Muhymeen
- (Malaysia) Mahali Jasuli
- (Malaysia) Norshahrul Idlan
- (Malaysia) Safee Sali
- (Malaysia) Safiq Rahim
- (Malaysia) Wan Zack Haikal
- (Myanmar) Kyi Lin
- (Philippines) Emelio Caligdong
- (Philippines) Ángel Guirado
- (Philippines) Paul Mulders
- (Philippines) Phil Younghusband
- (Singapore) Aleksandar Đurić
- (Singapore) Baihakki Khaizan
- (Singapore) Fahrudin Mustafić
- (Singapore) Fazrul Nawaz
- (Thailand) Adul Lahsoh
- (Thailand) Anucha Kitpongsri
- (Thailand) Apipoo Suntornpanavej
- (Thailand) Jakkraphan Pornsai
- (Thailand) Theerathon Bunmathan
- (Vietnam) Lê Tấn Tài
- (Vietnam) Nguyễn Văn Quyết

Own goal

- (Vietnam) Nguyễn Gia Từ (playing against Thailand)

== Team statistics ==
This table shows all team performance.

Pos	Team	Pld	W	D	L	GF	GA	GD
1	Singapore	7	4	1	2	11	6	+5
2	Thailand	7	5	1	1	14	6	+8
3	Philippines	5	2	1	2	4	3	+1
4	Malaysia	5	2	1	2	7	7	0
5	Indonesia	3	1	1	1	3	4	−1
6	Vietnam	3	0	1	2	2	5	−3
7	Laos	3	0	1	2	6	10	−4
8	Myanmar	3	0	1	2	1	7	−6

== Media coverage ==
2012 AFF Championship Broadcasters in Southeast Asia
Country	Broadcast network	Television station
Brunei	Radio Televisyen Brunei	RTB1
Cambodia	National Radio and Television of Kampuchea	TVK
Indonesia	Media Nusantara Citra	RCTI, Sindo TV
Laos	Lao National Radio and Television	LNTV1
Malaysia	Radio Televisyen Malaysia	TV1
Myanmar	Myanmar Radio and Television	Myanmar Television
Philippines	Associated Broadcasting Company	AKTV
Singapore	MediaCorp	Channel 5 (HD5), Okto
Thailand	Royal Thai Army	BBTV7
Vietnam	Vietnam Television	VTV2
