= Junior Eldstål =

Malaysian footballer (born 1991)

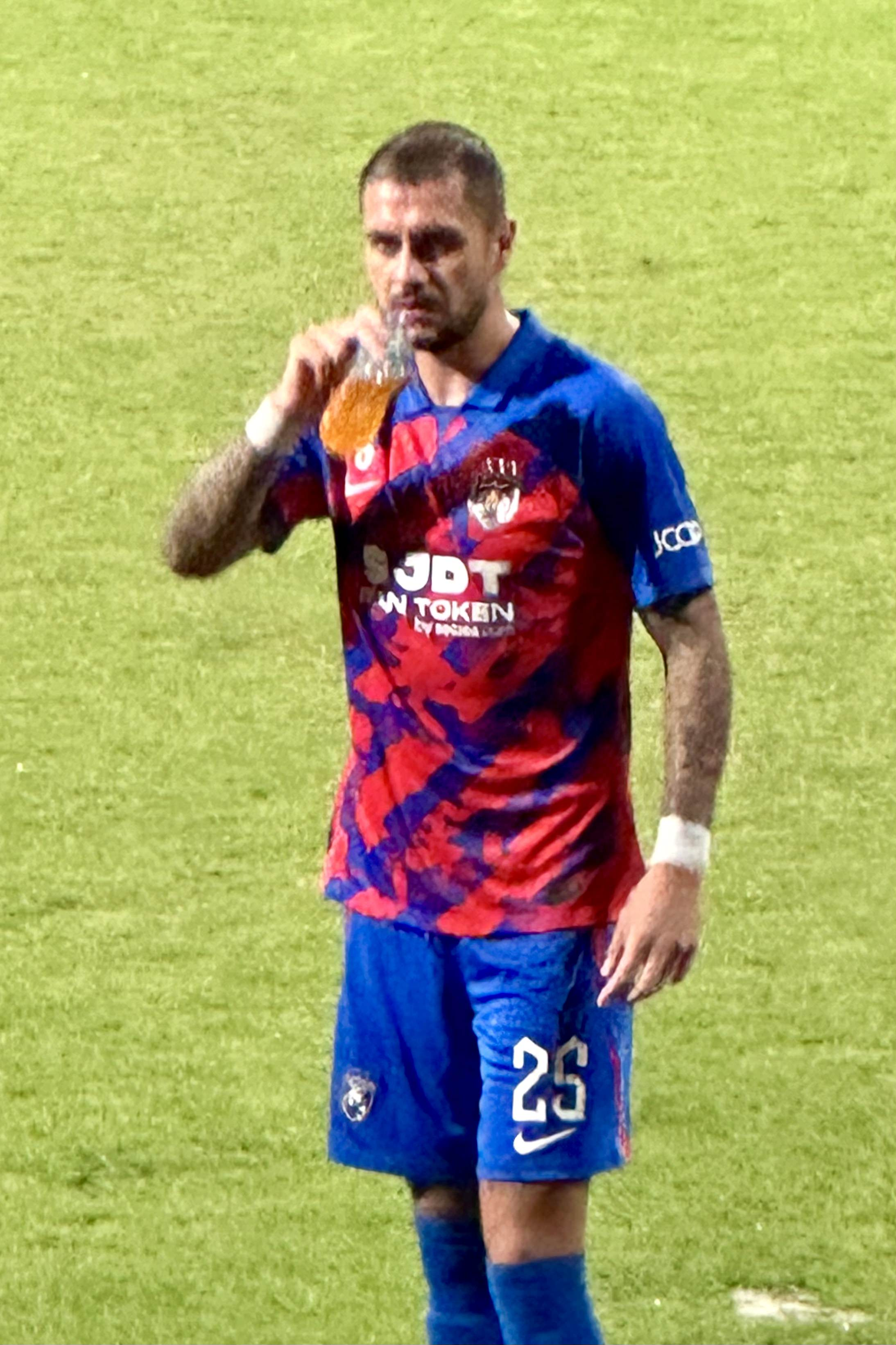
- Eldstål with Johor Darul Ta'zim in 2024

Personal information
- Full name: Junior Gunnar Putera Eldstål
- Date of birth: 16 September 1991 (age 35)
- Place of birth: Kota Kinabalu, Sabah, Malaysia
- Height: 1.91 m (6 ft 3 in)
- Position: Centre-back

Team information
- Current team: Johor Darul Ta'zim

Youth career
- 2004–2007: Aldershot
- 2008–2011: Reading
- 2010–2013: Hartpury College

Senior career*
Years	Team	Apps	(Gls)
2012–2013	Slimbridge	11	(2)
2013–2014	Sarawak	55	(2)
2015–2018	Johor Darul Ta'zim	40	(3)
2019	Metropolitan Police	3	(0)
2021	Chonburi	36	(3)
2022–	Johor Darul Ta'zim	2	(0)
2022	→ Johor Darul Ta'zim II	10	(0)
2023	→ PT Prachuap (loan)	4	(0)
2023	→ Dewa United (loan)	5	(0)

International career^{‡}
2013–2014	Malaysia U23	5	(1)
2014–	Malaysia	23	(0)
Medal record
Men's football
Representing Malaysia
Merdeka Tournament
Runner-up	2023
Malaysia U23
Winner	2013
- * Club domestic league appearances and goals as of 15 May 2025 ‡ National team caps and goals as of 22 March 2024

Junior Gunnar Putera Eldstål (born 16 September 1991) is a Malaysian professional footballer who plays as a centre-back for Malaysia Super League club Johor Darul Ta'zim and the Malaysia national team.

== Early life ==
Born in Kota Kinabalu, Sabah to a Malaysian mother from Sabah and Swedish father. Eldstål's family moved to Stockholm, when he was two years old, and then to Guildford, Surrey, England in 1999.

== Club career ==
=== Youth academy ===
Eldstål previously played for two English (Aldershot and Reading) clubs, before having a trial with Malaysian outfit. With a Swedish father, Eldstål holds a Swedish passport but decided to pursue Malaysian citizenship because his mother is Sabahan.

When he turned 19, he was enrolled in UWE Hartpury College Football Academy, where he studied a Sports Coaching degree while also being a part of the elite football programme. During his time with UWE, he also played for Slimbridge in 2012 on a part-time basis in the Hellenic Football League before he decided to play for Sarawak in the Malaysia Premier League.

=== Sarawak ===
==== 2013–14 season ====
In April 2013, Eldstål signed with Sarawak and made his league debut on 17 April 2013 in a second leg FA Cup Malaysia 0–2 home defeat against Kelantan as a last minute substitution. Since Eldstål joined the Crocs in April, he helped Sarawak win their first premiership domestic trophy in almost 16 years. Sarawak had an unbeaten run which was the league record. Eldstål, who had yet to score his first goal for Sarawak, had the distinction of providing two assists leading to two goals as the other goal scored by Zamri Morshidi was a similar result provided by his back-flick again. Sarawak officially booked their spot in the quarterfinals of the 2013 Malaysia Cup as they smashed in six goals against Perak to secure an impeccable 6–1 win.

In 2014, Sarawak was back in the Malaysia Super League since 2012, Eldstål was awarded a new, improved contract for his progress that would keep him at Sarawak FA until the end of 2014 season, but his debut for the league was delayed after suffering a back injury setback on 14 September 2013, followed by his operation in November then a two-month program of rehabilitation. His first full start of the season started in March and assisted a good few goals for Suppiah Chanturu and Ryan Griffiths. On 15 April, he produced a display with influential in scoring a goal to a 3–2 win at home over ATM FA. Eldstål subsequently ended 2013–14 season with 55 appearances in all.

=== Johor Darul Ta'zim ===
On 11 November 2014, Eldstål announced that he had signed a contract with one of the top teams in Southeast Asia, Johor Darul Ta'zim FC under coach Bojan, playing in the Malaysia Super League, until 2015. On his move, he was promptly inserted into the starting eleven playing as a centre back for the first pre-season matches against Johor Darul Ta'zim II, PKNS and Penang FA.

Eldstål would also like to break into the Malaysia national football team, unfortunately being unselected to Dollah Salleh's squad for the 2014 AFF Suzuki Cup. Despite all that, Eldstål has made an impressive debut against Pahang FA in the MSL 2015 opener. He led the team to their first silverware of the season winning the Charity Shield Malaysia.

On 14 March, JDT fell behind to a 35th-minute goal by Sime Darby to trail 0–1 at halftime. Eldstål was then played in midfield again alongside Hariss Harun and regular defender Marcos António, where Junior scored his first-ever Super League goal of this season in the 61st-minute equaliser in a 1–1 away game over Sime Darby. He scored his second goal for the club on 24 April 2015 in the 2–1 defeat for Perak.

On 29 October 2018, Eldstål uploaded a video and a statement to his personal social media, confirming the end of his time in Johor Darul Ta'zim and his return to the UK.

=== Metropolitan Police ===
On 5 March 2019, Eldstål debuted for English non-league side Metropolitan Police in a 2–1 win over Kings Langley, Eldstål's inclusion in the team was not announced publicly prior to the fixture and was formally announced by the club a couple of days later, confirming Eldstål had signed until the end of the 2018/19 season.

=== Chonburi F.C. ===
On 3 February 2021, Eldstål made his debut with Thai League 1 side Chonburi in a 3–0 win over Suphanburi in the 2021–22 Thai FA Cup Round 3. Eldstål made his team debut after got subs in 86th minute replacing Phanuphong Phonsa.

Under the management of Sasom Pobprasert, he became the main player for the team since the day of his quarantine time in Thailand ended. He successfully joined the starting eleven on 11 February 2021 in his team's 1–2 loss to Muangthong United in the Thai League 1. For the 2021-2022 Thai League 1 season, he made 32 appearances with the club and score 2 goals for Chonburi

=== Return to Johor Darul Ta'zim ===
On 7 July 2022, Junior was revealed as one of Johor Darul Ta'zim new signings for the remainder of the 2022 Malaysia Super League season. For the 2022 season, he played for Johor Darul Ta'zim reserve team, Johor Darul Ta'zim II.

=== PT Prachuap ===
On 5 January 2023, Eldstål signed on loan to a Thai League 1 side PT Prachuap.

On 2 April 2023, Eldstål made his debut in a 3–0 win over Khon Kaen United in the Thai League 1 round 25.

=== Dewa United ===
On 20 July 2023, Eldstål decided to move to Indonesia and signed a contract with Liga 1 club Dewa United.

== International career ==
=== Malaysia XI ===
In July 2013, Eldstål was called up to join the Harimau Muda A squad for the World University Games in Kazan, but he was not allowed to be registered for the tournament due to technical issues. On 11 July 2013, Eldstål was named in the senior squad for the first time in K. Rajagopal's 23-man shortlist for the upcoming July friendly against Chonburi on 16 July 2013. He later received a call-up for a match against Chelsea and Barcelona.

=== Malaysia ===
On 7 September 2013, Eldstål earned his first under-23 cap in a game against Singapore U-23 and scored his first goal for the squad on 14 September 2013 in the Merdeka Cup final against Myanmar U-23. Malaysia emerged as Asia Cup Champion after defeating Myanmar 2–0 at the Darul Makmur Stadium, with the match concluding with his goal in the 90th minute.

In September 2014, Ong Kim Swee named Eldstål in his final 23-man squad for the 2014 Asian Games, playing in Group A for the tournament in Incheon, South Korea. Eldstål played just two games in the tournament, a 0–3 loss in the first round match against the host South Korea. He missed the second round match, a 4–0 win over Laos, due to a minor calf injury. With only playing two games during the tournament, Malaysia finished third in the group after being knocked out as they lost 0–3 to Saudi Arabia on 21 September.

== Personal life ==
Eldstål is half-Swedish and half-Malaysian. He received the FAM Most Promising Player Award in 2013.

== Career statistics ==
=== Club ===
As of match played 20 February 2022

Appearances and goals by club, season and competition
Club	Season	League			National cup		League cup		Continental		Total	
Club	Season	Division	Apps	Goals	Apps	Goals	Apps	Goals	Apps	Goals	Apps	Goals
Chonburi	2020–21	Thai League 1	12	1	3 (Note: Appearances in Thai FA Cup)	1	0	0	—		15	2
Chonburi	2021–22	Thai League 1	20	1	1	0	0	0	—		21	1
Chonburi	Total		32	2	4	1	0	0	0	0	36	3
Career total			32	2	4	1	0	0	0	0	36	3

=== International ===
As of match played 22 March 2024

Appearances and goals by national team and year
National team	Year	Apps	Goals
Malaysia	2014	1	0
Malaysia	2015	5	0
Malaysia	2016	2	0
Malaysia	2021	4	0
Malaysia	2022	4	0
Malaysia	2023	5	0
Malaysia	2024	2	0
Total		23	0

== Honours ==
=== Club ===
Johor Darul Ta'zim

- Malaysia Super League: 2015, 2016, 2017, 2018, 2024–25
- Piala Sumbangsih: 2015, 2016, 2018, 2024
- Malaysia FA Cup: 2016, 2024
- Malaysia Cup: 2017, 2024–25
- AFC Cup: 2015

Sarawak FA

- Malaysia Premier League: 2013

Chonburi

- Thai FA Cup runner-up: 2020–21

Johor Darul Ta'zim II

- Malaysia Premier League: 2022

=== International ===
- Merdeka Tournament: 2013; runner up 2023
