= Brent McGrath =

Australian soccer player (born 1991)

Personal information
- Full name: Brent Colm McGrath
- Date of birth: 18 June 1991 (age 35)
- Place of birth: Sydney, Australia
- Height: 1.84 m (6 ft 1/2 in)
- Position: Forward

Team information
- Current team: Bentleigh Greens

Youth career
- 2005–2006: Sydney United
- 2006–2009: Brøndby

Senior career*
Years	Team	Apps	(Gls)
2010–2013	Brøndby	39	(2)
2013	Adelaide United	2	(0)
2014	Bentleigh Greens	13	(9)
2014	Sisaket	13	(7)
2015	Chonburi	0	(0)
2015	→ Port (loan)	15	(2)
2015–2016	FC Fredericia	27	(15)
2016–2019	Esbjerg fB	26	(1)
2017–2018	→ FC Fredericia (loan)	25	(5)
2019	Kolding IF	1	(0)
2020–	Bentleigh Greens	14	(5)

International career^{‡}
2006	Australia U-17	2	(0)
2009	Australia U-20	5	(1)
2011	Australia	1	(0)
- * Club domestic league appearances and goals as of 6 September 2021 ‡ National team caps and goals as of 4 March 2020

Brent Colm McGrath (born 18 June 1991) is an Australian footballer who currently plays as a striker for Bentleigh Greens in the National Premier Leagues.

Born in Sydney, McGrath played youth football for Brøndby before making his professional debut for the club in 2010. In 2013, Brent returned to Australia, playing for Adelaide United and Bentleigh Greens before spending time in the Thai Premier League. In 2015, he returned to Denmark with FC Fredericia before moving to Esbjerg fB one season later.

McGrath made one appearance for the Australian national team, a win over Germany in 2011.

== Junior Representative to International ==
Brent was recognized very early as a player of great potential while playing for Sydney United in the NSW Premier Youth League competition. As a 14-year-old, Brent was selected in the NSW state team. The early stages of the "U/14 Friendship Games" in 2005 were not always successful for Brent, but he found his way in time for the end of that tournament to be noticed by Ange Postecoglou and would eventually go on to become the youngest 'Joey' at the time (for the U/17 FIFA World Cup qualifiers in Laos, 2006)

== Club career ==
McGrath signed for Brøndby IF in 2010. On 22 March 2010, McGrath made his senior debut for the Brøndby first team against Randers, coming on as a 65th-minute substitute for Peter Madsen.

McGrath scored his first goal for the club in October 2010 against FC Nordsjælland in a 1–1 draw in the Danish Superliga.

Following his departure from Denmark, McGrath flew to Melbourne to trial with A-League club Melbourne Victory ahead of the 2013-14 season, but eventually signed for Adelaide United

On 20 August 2015, McGrath signed a one-year contract with the Danish 1st Division club FC Fredericia.

McGrath signed a three-year deal with Danish Superliga side Esbjerg fB in May 2016. He was loaned back to Fredericia in his second season at the club. McGrath left Denmark and Esbjerg at the end of the 2018/19 season, where his contract expired.

On 6 July 2019, McGrath joined newly promoted Danish 1st Division club Kolding IF. He scored on his competitive debut for the club, a win over Dalum IF in the 2019–20 Danish Cup on 7 August 2019. McGrath left Kolding to return to Australia in September 2019.

McGrath returned to Australia to join National Premier Leagues Victoria club Bentleigh Greens in December 2019.

== International career ==
McGrath received his first Socceroos call up by coach Holger Osieck for a friendly against Germany. He came on as a substitute for Brett Holman in time added on in Australia's 2-1 victory.

== Career statistics ==
=== Club ===
As of 4 March 2020

Club	Season	League			Cup		Continental		Total	
Club	Season	Division	Apps	Goals	Apps	Goals	Apps	Goals	Apps	Goals
Brøndby	2009–10	Danish Superliga	6	0	0	0	0	0	6	0
Brøndby	2010–11	Danish Superliga	10	1	0	0	0	0	10	1
Brøndby	2011–12	Danish Superliga	13	1	2	2	2	0	17	3
Brøndby	2012–13	Danish Superliga	10	0	3	1	0	0	13	1
Brøndby	Brøndby total		39	2	5	3	2	0	46	5
Adelaide United	2013–14	A-League	2	0	0	0	0	0	2	0
Bentleigh Greens	2014	National Premier Leagues	13	9	1	1	0	0	14	10
Sisaket	2014	Thai Premier League	13	7	0	0	0	0	13	7
Chonburi	2015	Thai Premier League	0	0	0	0	0	0	0	0
Port (loan)	2015	Thai Premier League	15	2	1	1	0	0	16	3
FC Fredericia	2015–16	Danish 1st Division	27	15	3	0	0	0	30	15
Esbjerg fB	2016–17	Danish Superliga	17	1	1	0	0	0	18	1
Esbjerg fB	2018–19	Danish Superliga	9	0	3	2	0	0	12	2
Esbjerg fB	Esbjerg total		26	1	4	2	0	0	30	3
FC Fredericia (loan)	2017–18	Danish 1st Division	14	4	3	4	0	0	16	7
Kolding IF	2019–20	Danish 1st Division	1	0	1	1	0	0	2	1
Bentleigh Greens	2020	National Premier Leagues	5	3	1	0	0	0	6	3
Bentleigh Greens	2021	National Premier Leagues	1	0	0	0	0	0	1	0
Bentleigh Greens	Bentleigh total		6	3	1	0	0	0	7	3
Career total			156	43	19	12	2	0	176	55

== Honours ==
=== Club ===
Bentleigh Greens

- FV Community Shield: 2020
