= Vendry Mofu =

Indonesian footballer

Personal information
- Full name: Vendry Ronaldo Mofu
- Date of birth: 10 September 1989 (age 37)
- Place of birth: Wamena, Indonesia
- Height: 1.70 m (5 ft 7 in)
- Position: Midfielder

Team information
- Current team: Persitema Temanggung
- Number: 10

Youth career
- PS SPK

Senior career*
Years	Team	Apps	(Gls)
2007–2008	Persigubin Pegunungan Bintang	18	(2)
2008–2010	Persiwa Wamena	40	(5)
2010–2013	Semen Padang	87	(12)
2013–2014	Sriwijaya	17	(4)
2014–2017	Semen Padang	66	(19)
2018–2019	Bhayangkara	27	(2)
2019–2021	Semen Padang	16	(2)
2021	Dewa United	3	(0)
2022	Semen Padang	4	(3)
2023–2024	PSBS Biak	14	(0)
2024–2025	Persipa Pati	7	(0)
2025–	Persitema Temanggung	3	(1)

International career
2012–2013	Indonesia	11	(2)
- * Club domestic league appearances and goals as of 23:08, 14 January 2026 (UTC)

Vendry Ronaldo Mofu (born 10 September 1989) is an Indonesian professional footballer who plays as a midfielder for Persitema Temanggung.

== Personal life ==
Vendry is a descendant of the Biak people, he bears the surname "Mofu" from his father. He decided to convert to Islam in 2010, at that time he played for Semen Padang. He then married on 15 July 2010 to a Minangkabau local girl named Prima Elfina.

== International career ==
Vendry Mofu receives and score his first senior international cap against North Korea on 10 September 2012.

Indonesian's goal tally first.

International appearances and goals
#	Date	Venue	Opponent	Result	Competition	Goal (Total)
2012
1	10 September	Gelora Bung Karno Stadium, Jakarta, Indonesia	North Korea	0–2	2012 SCTV Cup	
2	15 September	Gelora Bung Tomo Stadium, Surabaya, Indonesia	Vietnam	0–0	Friendly	
3	26 September	Hassanal Bolkiah National Stadium, Bandar Seri Begawan, Brunei	Brunei	5–0	Friendly	1 (1)
4	16 October	Mỹ Đình National Stadium, Hanoi, Vietnam	Vietnam	0–0	Friendly	
5	25 November	Bukit Jalil National Stadium, Kuala Lumpur, Malaysia	Laos	2–2	2012 AFF Suzuki Cup	1 (2)
6	28 November	Bukit Jalil National Stadium, Kuala Lumpur, Malaysia	Singapore	1–0	2012 AFF Suzuki Cup	
7	1 December	Bukit Jalil National Stadium, Kuala Lumpur, Malaysia	Malaysia	0–2	2012 AFF Suzuki Cup	
2013
8	31 January	Amman International Stadium, Amman, Jordan	Jordan	0–5	Friendly	
9	6 February	Rashid Stadium, Dubai, United Arab Emirates	Iraq	0–1	2015 AFC Asian Cup qualification	
10	7 June	Gelora Bung Karno Stadium, Jakarta, Indonesia	Netherlands	0–3	Friendly	
11	15 October	Gelora Bung Karno Stadium, Jakarta, Indonesia	China	1–1	2015 AFC Asian Cup qualification	

== Honours ==
=== Club ===
Semen Padang

- Indonesia Premier League: 2011–12
- Indonesian Community Shield: 2013
- Piala Indonesia runner-up: 2012

Dewa United

- Liga 2 third-place (play-offs): 2021

PSBS Biak

- Liga 2: 2023–24
