= Surawich Logarwit =

Thai footballer (born 1993)

Personal information
- Full name: Surawich Logarwit
- Date of birth: 11 February 1993 (age 33)
- Place of birth: Bangkok, Thailand
- Height: 1.65 m (5 ft 5 in)
- Position: Right back

Team information
- Current team: Sukhothai
- Number: 2

Youth career
- 2009–2010: Assumption College Sriracha

Senior career*
Years	Team	Apps	(Gls)
2011–2012	Sriracha	3	(0)
2013–2015	Chonburi	13	(0)
2015–2017	PTT Rayong	32	(3)
2018–2019	Chiangmai	22	(0)
2020–2023	Chiangmai United	78	(3)
2023–	Sukhothai	36	(1)

International career
2014–2015	Thailand U23	1	(0)
- * Club domestic league appearances and goals as of 12 January 2025

Surawich Logarwit (Thai: สุรวิช โลกาวิทย์, born 11 February 1993) is a Thai professional footballer who plays for Sukhothai in Thai League 1 as a defender.
