= Rangsan Wiroonsri =

Thai footballer (born 1992)

Personal information
- Full name: Rangsan Wiroonsri
- Date of birth: 12 February 1992 (age 34)
- Place of birth: Nakhon Sawan, Thailand
- Height: 1.73 m (5 ft 8 in)
- Position: Defensive midfielder

Team information
- Current team: Trat
- Number: 5

Youth career
- 2005–2009: JMG Academy

Senior career*
Years	Team	Apps	(Gls)
2010–2014	BEC Tero Sasana	3	(0)
2015–2017	PTT Rayong	43	(2)
2018	Navy	16	(0)
2019	Sukhothai	23	(0)
2020	Trat	10	(2)
2020–2022	Chonburi	32	(0)
2022–2023	Police Tero	13	(0)
2023–	Trat	8	(0)
- * Club domestic league appearances and goals as of 14 May 2023

Rangsan Wiroonsri (Thai: รังสรรค์ วิรุฬห์ศรี, born 12 February 1992) is a Thai professional footballer who plays as a defensive midfielder for Thai League 1 club Trat.
