= Kirati Keawsombat =

Thai footballer

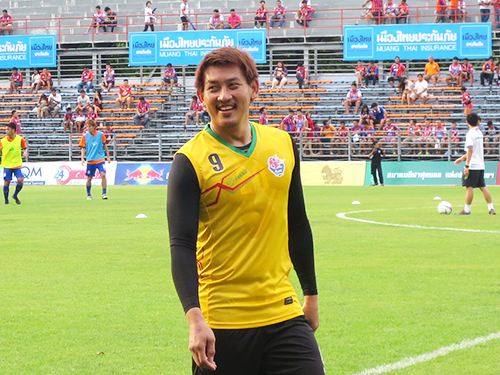

Personal information
- Full name: Kirati Keawsombat
- Date of birth: 12 January 1987 (age 39)
- Place of birth: Nan, Thailand
- Height: 1.79 m (5 ft 10 1/2 in)
- Position: Striker

Youth career
- 2005–2006: Assumption College Thonburi

Senior career*
Years	Team	Apps	(Gls)
2007–2008	Army United	34	(9)
2009	TOT	20	(4)
2010–2012	Buriram United	38	(8)
2012	→ Songkhla United (loan)	19	(7)
2013–2016	PTT Rayong	49	(17)
2015	→ Chonburi (loan)	10	(6)
2016	Khon Kaen United	9	(5)
2017–2018	Nakhon Ratchasima	19	(1)
2019–2021	Police Tero	46	(8)
2021–2022	Uthai Thani	15	(1)
2022	Assumption United	11	(2)
2023	Samut Prakan City	8	(0)
2023	Assumption United	6	(0)
Total		284	(68)

International career
2009–2010	Thailand U23	9	(4)
2009–2014	Thailand	27	(5)
Medal record
Thailand
Asean Football Championship
Runner-up	AFF Suzuki Cup 2012	2012
Winner	AFF Suzuki Cup 2014	2014
- * Club domestic league appearances and goals

Kirati Keawsombat (Thai: กีรติ เขียวสมบัติ; RTGS: Kirati Khiao-sombat), simply known as Pop (Thai: ป๊อป) is a Thai retired professional footballer who plays as a striker.

== Club career ==
His career began in Assumption College Thonburi, where he attended school. In 2007, he was hired by the former Thai Division 1 League side Army United. After the descent of the association in 2008 he moved to TOT for only one season later, his coach Pongphan Wongsuwan to follow Buriram PEA. In 2012 Kirati went to Wuachon United and scored a couple of goals. In 2013, he played with PTT Rayong in the 2013 Thai Division 1 League.

== International career ==
From 2005 to 2006 he was in the squad of the U-19 national team. He was in the squad AFF U-19 Youth Championship in 2005 and also in the squad, which struggled to qualify for the U-19 Asian Cup. The team failed to qualify for the final tournament at the end. Kirati however, was not taken into account.

Since 2009 he is both part of the cadre of U-23 and the men's team. For both teams it could have been recorded inserts. Kirati is in the squad for the 25th Southeast Asia Games. In the first match against Vietnam, he scored his first goal for the U-23rd. He was part of the 2010 AFF Suzuki Cup, 2012 AFF Suzuki Cup and the 2014 AFF Suzuki Cup.

== Style of Play ==
Kirati is a striker who relies on his strength, or commonly known as a target man. His stocky physique allows him to win most headers and help teammates score goals. Kirati is also known for his high work rate.

== International goals ==
#	Date	Venue	Opponent	Score	Result	Competition
—	December 29, 2009	Thai-Japanese Stadium, Bangkok, Thailand	Zimbabwe	3–0	3–0	Unofficial friendly
1.	September 8, 2010	Ambedkar Stadium, New Delhi, India	India	2–1	2–1	Friendly
2.	November 30, 2012	Rajamangala Stadium, Bangkok, Thailand	Vietnam	1–0	3–1	2012 AFF Suzuki Cup
3.	November 30, 2012	Rajamangala Stadium, Bangkok, Thailand	Vietnam	2–0	3–1	2012 AFF Suzuki Cup
4.	December 22, 2012	Supachalasai Stadium, Bangkok, Thailand	Singapore	1–0	1–0	2012 AFF Suzuki Cup Final Second Leg
5.	November 18, 2014	Nakhon Ratchasima, Isan, Thailand	New Zealand	1–0	2–0	Friendly

== Honours ==
=== Clubs ===
Buriram PEA

- Thai League 1 (1) : 2011
- Thai FA Cup (1) : 2011
- Thai League Cup (1) : 2011

Uthai Thani

- Thai League 3 (1): 2021–22
- Thai League 3 Northern Region (1): 2021–22

=== International ===
Thailand

- ASEAN Football Championship (1) : 2014
