= Prince Amponsah (footballer) =

Ghanaian footballer

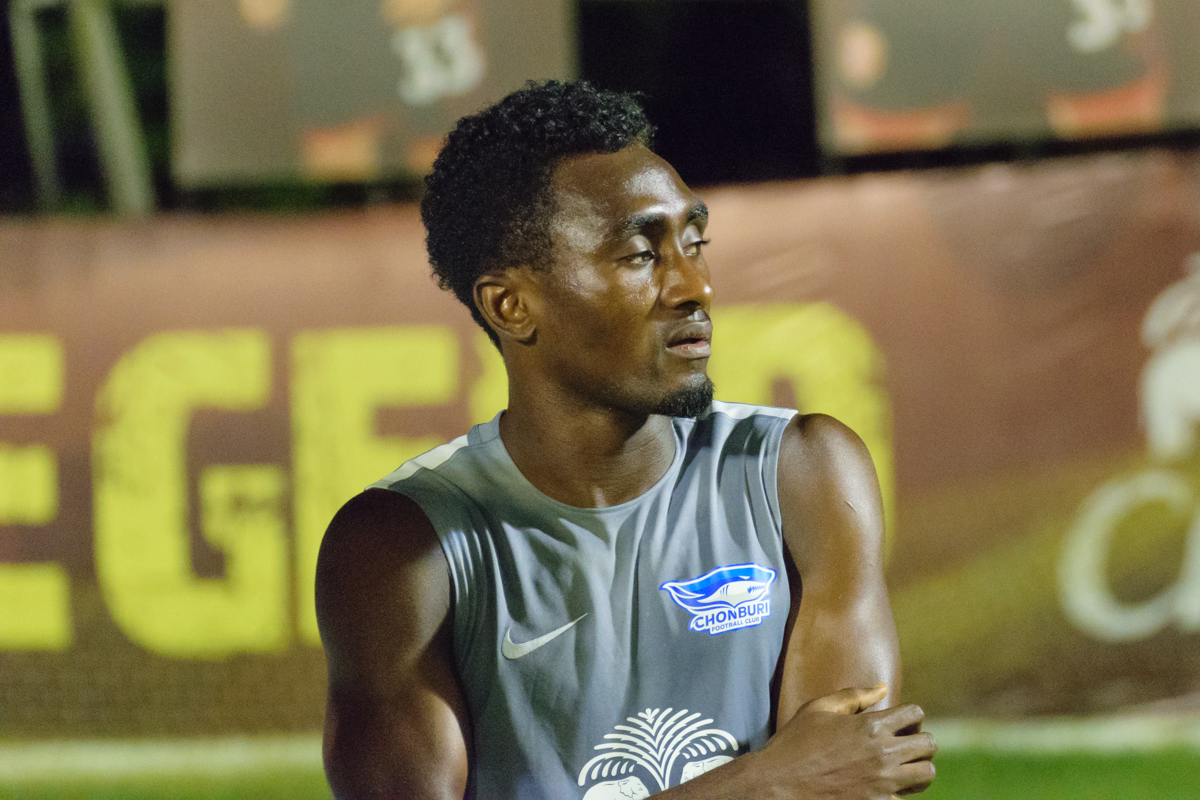

Personal information
- Full name: Prince Amponsah
- Date of birth: 29 December 1996 (age 29)
- Place of birth: Accra, Ghana
- Height: 1.86 m (6 ft 1 in)
- Position: Striker

Youth career
- 2013–2015: Chonburi

Senior career*
Years	Team	Apps	(Gls)
2016–2021	Chonburi	57	(20)
2016	→ Phan Thong (loan)	16	(5)
2018	→ Angthong (loan)	14	(2)
2020–2021	→ Uthai Thani (loan)	15	(5)
2021	→ Navy (loan)	0	(0)
2021–2022	FK Pelister	24	(1)
- * Club domestic league appearances and goals

Prince Amponsah (born 29 December 1996) is a Ghananian footballer who last played as a striker for FK Pelister.
