= Wisarut Waingan =

Thai footballer (born 1991)

Wisarut Wai-ngan
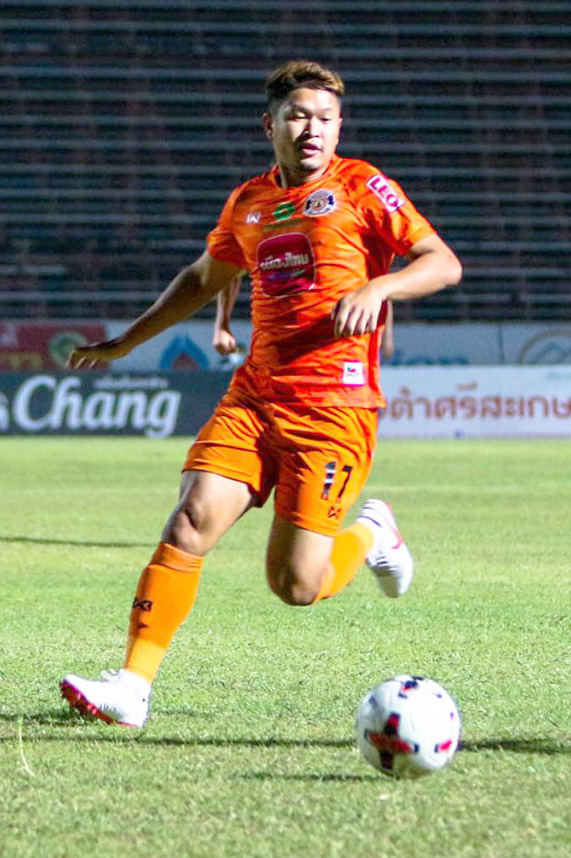
- Wisarut Wai-ngan playing for Sisaket.

Personal information
- Full name: Wisarut Wai-ngan
- Date of birth: 24 August 1991 (age 35)
- Place of birth: Prachinburi, Thailand
- Height: 1.70 m (5 ft 7 in)
- Position: Right back

Youth career
- 2006–2008: Osotspa

Senior career*
Years	Team	Apps	(Gls)
2009–2011	Osotspa	0	(0)
2011–2014	Thai Port	18	(0)
2012–2013	→ Nakhon Ratchasima (loan)	16	(0)
2015	Chonburi	4	(0)
2016	Prachuap	19	(2)
2017	Sisaket	8	(0)
2018	Trat		
2019	Ubon United	23	(0)
2020	Uthai Thani	7	(1)
2021	Sisaket	13	(0)
2021–2022	Ubon Kruanapat	18	(1)
2022–2023	Suphanburi	28	(1)

International career
2009–2010	Thailand U19	4	(0)
- * Club domestic league appearances and goals as of 12 May 2023

Wisarut Waingan (Thai: วิศรุต ไวงาน) is a Thai professional footballer who plays as a defender.
