= Anthonio Sanjairag =

Thai footballer

Personal information
- Full name: Anthonio Nino Sanjairag
- Date of birth: 16 April 2002 (age 24)
- Place of birth: Nacka, Sweden
- Height: 1.89 m (6 ft 2 in)
- Position: Centre-back

Team information
- Current team: Samui United
- Number: 15

Youth career
- –2015: Årsta FF
- 2016–2020: Djurgården

Senior career*
Years	Team	Apps	(Gls)
2019–2020	Djurgården	0	(0)
2021–2023	Chonburi	5	(0)
2023	Uthai Thani	0	(0)
2024–2025	Nakhon Ratchasima	15	(0)
2026–	Samui United	6	(0)

International career^{‡}
2018	Sweden U17		
2021	Thailand U23	2	(0)
- * Club domestic league appearances and goals as of 02:30, 2 December 2024 (UTC) ‡ National team caps and goals as of 03:05, 17 October 2021 (UTC)

Anthonio Sanjairag (Thai: อันโธนิโอ แสนใจรักษ์, born 16 April 2002) is a professional footballer who plays as a centre-back for Thai League 3 club Samui United. Born in Sweden, he has most recently represented Thailand at youth level.

== International career ==
On 15 October 2021, Sanjairag was called up to the Thailand under-23 national team for the 2022 AFC U-23 Asian Cup qualification phase.

== Personal life ==
Sanjairag was born and raised in Sweden and is of Thai descent.

== Honours ==
=== Club ===
Djurgården

- Allsvenskan: 2019
