= Chitsanupong Choti =

Thai footballer (born 2001)

Personal information
- Full name: Chitsanupong Choti
- Date of birth: 29 September 2001 (age 25)
- Place of birth: Lop Buri, Thailand
- Height: 1.73 m (5 ft 8 in)
- Positions: Attacking midfielder; winger

Team information
- Current team: Khon Kaen United
- Number: 92

Youth career
- 2019–2020: Chonburi

Senior career*
Years	Team	Apps	(Gls)
2020–2023	Chonburi	22	(0)
2020–2021	→ Khon Kaen United (loan)	5	(0)
2022	→ Chiangmai (loan)	0	(0)
2024–	Khon Kaen United	39	(6)

International career^{‡}
2024	Thailand U23	3	(1)
2024–	Thailand	1	(0)
- * Club domestic league appearances and goals as of 26 October 2024 ‡ National team caps and goals as of 18 November 2024

Chitsanupong Choti (Thai: ชิษณุพงษ์ โชติ, born 29 September 2001), is a Thai professional footballer who plays as an attacking midfielder or a winger for Thai League 2 club Khon Kaen United and the Thailand national team.

== International career ==
In November 2024, Chitsanupong was called up by Thailand national team for friendly match against Lebanon and Laos.
