= Samart Panya =

Thai footballer (born 1985)

Personal information
- Full name: Samart Panya
- Date of birth: 7 October 1985 (age 41)
- Place of birth: Thailand
- Height: 1.79 m (5 ft 10 1/2 in)
- Position: Centre back

Team information
- Current team: Saraburi United
- Number: 25

Senior career*
Years	Team	Apps	(Gls)
2015	Saraburi	15	(0)
2016–2017	Navy	23	(0)
2017	Chonburi	2	(0)
2018–2019	Phrae United		
2019	Saraburi United	1	(0)
2019–2020	Phrae United	2	(0)
2020–2022	Saraburi United	30	(1)
2023–	Saraburi United	0	(0)
- * Club domestic league appearances and goals as of 10 April 2022

Samart Panya (Thai: สามารถ ปัญญา, (born 7 October 1985), is a Thai professional footballer who plays as a กองเชียร์ for Thai League 3 club Saraburi United.
