= Anucha Kitphongsri =

Thai footballer (born 1983)

Personal information
- Full name: Anucha Kitphongsri
- Date of birth: May 23, 1983 (age 43)
- Place of birth: Bangkok, Thailand
- Height: 1.75 m (5 ft 9 in)
- Positions: Left-back; winger

Team information
- Current team: Trat (assistant manager)

Youth career
- 1995–1997: Patumkongka School
- 1998–1999: Rajdamnern Commercial College

Senior career*
Years	Team	Apps	(Gls)
2000	Rajpracha	11	(2)
2001	Bangkok Bank	18	(5)
2002–2003	BEC Tero Sasana	26	(2)
2004–2006	Bangkok Bank	40	(6)
2010	Pattaya United	26	(1)
2011–2013	Chonburi	54	(9)
2014–2016	BEC Tero Sasana	34	(0)
2017	Chonburi	15	(0)
2018	Udon Thani	3	(0)
2018–2019	Trat	24	(0)
2023–	Trat	0	(0)
Total		254	(25)

International career
1999–2000	Thailand U17	15	(6)
2000–2001	Thailand U20	13	(3)
2001–2002	Thailand U23	12	(1)
2002–2014	Thailand	25	(1)

Managerial career
- 2022–: Trat (assistant)
Medal record
Thailand
Asean Football Championship
Runner-up	AFF Suzuki Cup 2012	2012
Winner	AFF Suzuki Cup 2014	2014
Thailand under-23
Southeast Asian Games
Gold medal – first place	2001 Kuala Lumpur	Football
- * Club domestic league appearances and goals

Anucha Kitphongsri (Thai: อนุชา กิจพงษ์ศรี, born May 23, 1983), simply known as Boy (Thai: บอย), is a Thai professional football coach and former professional footballer who plays as a left-back, He is the current assistant manager of Thai League 1 side Trat.

He played for BEC Tero Sasana in the ASEAN Club Championship 2003, where the club finished runners'-up.

== International career ==
Chayapat was a part of Thailand's squads in the 2012 AFF Suzuki Cup and the winning team in the 2014 AFF Suzuki Cup. In the former tournament Chayapat scored one of the goals of the tournament against Philippines dribbling past two defenders and the goalkeeper to score in a 2–1 win.

== International goals ==
=== International goals ===
==== Under-19 ====
#	Date	Venue	Opponent	Score	Result	Competition
1.	23 January 2002	Bangkok, Thailand	Singapore	1–1	5-1	2002 AFF U-20 Youth Championship
2.	23 January 2002	Bangkok, Thailand	Singapore	5–1	5-1	2002 AFF U-20 Youth Championship

==== Thailand ====
#	Date	Venue	Opponent	Score	Result	Competition
1.	November 24, 2012	Rajamangala Stadium, Bangkok, Thailand	Philippines	2–0	2–1	2012 AFF Suzuki Cup

== Honours ==
=== Club ===
BEC Tero Sasana

- Thai League Cup: 2014
- Toyota Premier Cup: 2015

=== International ===
Thailand U-19

- AFF U-20 Youth Championship: 2002

Thailand

- ASEAN Football Championship: 2014

=== Individual ===
- ASEAN Football Championship Best XI: 2012
- ASEAN Football Federation Best XI: 2013
