= Warut Supphaso =

Thai footballer (born 1986)

Personal information
- Full name: Warut Supphaso
- Date of birth: 2 January 1986 (age 40)
- Place of birth: Sakon Nakhon, Thailand
- Height: 1.70 m (5 ft 7 in)
- Position: Midfielder

Team information
- Current team: Pattaya Dolphins United
- Number: 30

Youth career
- 2002–2005: Ratwinit Bangkaeo School

Senior career*
| Years | Team | Apps | (Gls) |
| 2010–2012 | Chiangmai | 55 | (2) |
| 2013 | Rayong | 15 | (0) |
| 2013 | Phitsanulok | 23 | (1) |
| 2014 | Singhtarua | 37 | (1) |
| 2015–2016 | Chonburi | 14 | (0) |
| 2016 | → Prachuap (loan) | 19 | (3) |
| 2017 | Sisaket | 3 | (0) |
| 2017 | Lampang | 8 | (0) |
| 2018 | Trat | 19 | (0) |
| 2019 | Udon Thani | 26 | (3) |
| 2020–2021 | Rayong | 8 | (0) |
| 2021– | Pattaya Dolphins United | 18 | (1) |
- * Club domestic league appearances and goals as of 8 March 2022

Warut Supphaso (Thai: วรุตน์ สัพโส, born January 2, 1986) is a Thai professional footballer who plays as a midfielder for Thai League 3 club Pattaya Dolphins United.
