= Nguyễn Gia Từ =

Vietnamese footballer

Personal information
- Full name: Nguyễn Gia Từ
- Date of birth: 17 December 1989 (age 36)
- Place of birth: Can Lộc, Hà Tĩnh, Vietnam
- Height: 1.76 m (5 ft 9 in)
- Position: Centre-back

Youth career
- 2004–2009: Hồng Lĩnh Hà Tĩnh

Senior career*
Years	Team	Apps	(Gls)
2010–2011	Hồng Lĩnh Hà Tĩnh	9	(0)
2011–2014	Vissai Ninh Bình	51	(0)

International career
2012–2013	Vietnam	14	(0)
- * Club domestic league appearances and goals

Nguyễn Gia Từ (born 17 December 1989) is a Vietnamese footballer who last played as a centre-back for V.League 1 club Vissai Ninh Bình. He made 14 appearances for the Vietnam national team.

In December 2014, he was one of nine Ninh Binh players found guilty of match-fixing and banned for life from all football-related activities. He also received a two-year suspended prison sentence.
