= Phitak Pimpae =

Thai footballer (born 2000)

Personal information
- Full name: Phitak Pimpae
- Date of birth: 14 January 2000 (age 26)
- Place of birth: Khon Kaen, Thailand
- Height: 1.60 m (5 ft 3 in)
- Position: Winger

Team information
- Current team: Kasem Bundit University
- Number: 55

Youth career
- 2015–2020: Chonburi

Senior career*
Years	Team	Apps	(Gls)
2020–2024	Chonburi	53	(2)
2020	→ Banbueng (loan)	5	(0)
2024	Police Tero	13	(0)
2025	Suphanburi	11	(0)
2025–	Kasem Bundit University	16	(4)
- * Club domestic league appearances and goals as of 26 March 2026

Phitak Pimpae (Thai: พิทักษ์ พิมแป้, born January 14, 2000) is a Thailand professional footballer who plays as a winger for Thai League 3 club Kasem Bundit University.
