= Juliano Mineiro =

Brazilian footballer

Personal information
- Full name: Juliano Mineiro Fernandes
- Date of birth: 14 February 1986 (age 40)
- Place of birth: Rio de Janeiro, Brazil
- Height: 1.75 m (5 ft 9 in)
- Position: Attacking midfielder

Youth career
- 2003–2004: Fluminense

Senior career*
Years	Team	Apps	(Gls)
2004–2008	Fluminense	23	(3)
2007	→ Juventude (loan)	2	(0)
2007–2008	→ Náutico (loan)	0	(0)
2008–2012	Nacional	22	(1)
2009	→ Bahia (loan)	8	(1)
2010–2011	→ Najran (loan)	23	(7)
2013	Tombense	1	(0)
2013–2014	Metropolitano	31	(6)
2014	Paraná	6	(0)
2014–2015	Chonburi	42	(9)
2016	Kashiwa Reysol	0	(0)
2017	Selangor	11	(5)
2017	Kazma SC		

International career^{‡}
2003	Brazil U17	2	(0)
- * Club domestic league appearances and goals as of 7 March 2017 ‡ National team caps and goals as of 20 February 2017

Juliano Mineiro Fernandes (born 14 February 1986), also known as Juliano Mineiro or formerly Juliano, is a Brazilian former professional footballer who played as an attacking midfielder.

== Honours ==
Chonburi

- Thai Premier League runner-up: 2014
- Thai FA Cup runner-up: 2014

Brazil U17

- FIFA U-17 World Cup: 2003
