= Thiago Cunha =

Brazilian footballer (born 1985)

Personal information
- Full name: Thiago dos Santos Cunha
- Date of birth: 25 April 1985 (age 41)
- Place of birth: Volta Redonda (RJ), Brazil
- Height: 1.77 m (5 ft 9 1/2 in)
- Position: Forward

Youth career
- 2005: Wigan Athletic

Senior career*
Years	Team	Apps	(Gls)
2005–2006	Wigan Athletic	20	(9)
2006–2007	Real Murcia	8	(0)
2007–2008	Queimadense	22	(9)
2008–2009	Palmeiras	15	(3)
2009–2010	Vila Nova	17	(4)
2010	→ Nacional de Patos (loan)	14	(6)
2010	Desportivo Brasil	1	(0)
2010	→ Treze (loan)	8	(3)
2010	Bragantino	5	(0)
2011	Santa Cruz	24	(11)
2012	Guaratinguetá	4	(1)
2012	Treze	16	(8)
2012–2015	Chonburi	70	(52)
2016	Port	15	(11)
2016	Mumbai City	6	(0)
2017	Londrina	8	(0)
2017	Barito Putera	3	(2)
2017	Chonburi	6	(3)
2018	Náutico	16	(5)
2019	Ayutthaya United	19	(9)
Total		297	(136)
- * Club domestic league appearances and goals

Thiago dos Santos Cunha (born 25 April 1985) is a Brazilian-born Timorese former professional footballer who plays as a forward.

== Career ==
Thiago was revealed in the academy of Barra da Tijuca and moved to Wigan Athletic Academy and had tickets for Brazilian clubs and abroad to get to Santa Cruz in 2008, where he was fast and good passing, scoring several goals. Then he was traded with Palmeiras.

His debut was in a game of Copa Sudamericana against Vasco on 17 September 2008. Palmeiras won the match by 3 × 0 with two goals of his own and eliminated the team from Rio who had won the first game 3–1.

Thiago has a contract with Brazil Sports, Traffic Team, which bought 70% of his economic rights of Iraty (SC).

In early 2010 he played for Nacional (PB) where he scored 11 goals.

He was loaned to Treze (PB) until the end of the 2010 Brazilian Serie D.

=== Chonburi F.C. ===
In 2012, Cunha completed his move to Chonburi

==== 2012-13 season ====
In 2012 AFC Cup, Cunha was a hat-trick scorer for Chonburi in 2nd leg, before the team won the match against the Syrian side 4-2 Al-Shorta at Prince Mohammed Stadium, Zarqa (jordan)

=== Port F.C. ===
Despite a successful 2015 season where Chonburi finished fourth, at the end of the season Cunha announced he would be joining Thai Port despite the fact that the club had been relegated. on 29 August 2016 it was announced that Cunha was leaving Thai Port after scoring five goals in 21 matches.

== International career ==
In 2014 Cunha became a naturalized citizen of East Timor. On 19 January 2017, the Asian Football Confederation found, however, that he had a falsified Timorese birth or baptismal certificate. Subsequently, they declared Cunha and eleven other Brazilian men's footballers ineligible to represent East Timor. In Cunha's case, he did not register international matches played for the Southeast Asian country.

== Honours ==
Treze PB

- Campeonato Paraibano: 2010

Santa Cruz

- Campeonato Pernambucano: 2011
