= Ratwinit Bangkaeo School =

- โรงเรียนราชวินิตบางแก้ว

Location
- 31 Moo 13 Soi Muangkaeo 4 Bangkaeo; Bang Phli; Samut Prakan, 10540; Thailand
- Coordinates: 13.647513°N 100.672827°E

Information
- Type: Government
- Mottoes: Diligent, honest, clean, efficient, well-mannered, Discipline, Knowledge, grateful sacrifice.
- Established: 9 March 1972
- Founder: Bhumibol Adulyadej
- School board: Samut Prakan - Chachoengsao Education Service Area Office 1
- Authority: Office of the Basic Education Commission
- School number: 11022007
- Director: Supakorn Mekkayai
- Grades: 7–12 (mathayom 1–6)
- Enrolment: 3,739 (2014 academic year)
- Language: (Thailand) Thai language (United Kingdom) English (Japan) Japanese language (China) Chinese language
- Colours: Orange & Black
- Song: Ratwinit Bangkaeo March
- Website: http://www.rwb.ac.th

Ratwinit Bangkaeo School (Thai: โรงเรียนราชวินิตบางแก้ว) is a co-educational school located in Bang Phli District, Samut Prakan Province, Thailand. The school was established under the patronage of King Bhumibol Adulyadej. The name "Ratwinit" refers to an institution where students are educated and encouraged to develop good character.

== History ==
The land for Ratwinit Bangkaeo School, measuring 30 rai, was donated by Mr. Sukhum and Mrs. Junforng Thirawat to King Bhumibol Adulyadej for the establishment of the school. Following the king's recommendation to expand educational opportunities, the school was opened in 1972 with an initial enrollment of 347 students. The campus now covers over 42 rai, 2 ngan, and 30 square meters.

== Buildings ==
The school campus comprises several buildings, each serving specific administrative and academic functions:

=== Building 1 Romklao ===
Houses the Finance Department, Academic Department, Social Studies, Religion and Culture Department, Personnel Department, and classrooms for Chinese and Japanese language studies.

=== Building 2 Bongkodmard ===
Contains the Administration Department, Student Council Office, Music & Dance rooms, Mathematics Department, and Thai Language Department.

=== Building 3 Ratchawitarn ===
Includes the Science Department and science laboratories.

=== Building 4 Siriyakarn ===
Features the Public Relations Room, Audiovisual Education Room, School Bank, Cooking Laboratory, Health and Physical Education Department, Occupations and Technology Department, and Foreign Languages Department.

=== Building 5 Chalermprakiat 2 ===
Houses the old canteen, Solar Energy Room, additional audiovisual rooms, Learner Development Activities Room, Computer Room, Arts Department, gym, and classrooms for gifted students in science and mathematics.

=== Building 6 Chalermprakiat 1 ===
Contains the Thai Library, Music and Thai Dance Department, and auditorium.

=== Building 7 48 Punsa Chalermprakiat ===
Includes the MEP Library, staff rooms, classrooms for the Mini English Program (MEP) and Chinese immersion programs, additional auditoriums, and Computer Room.

=== Other facilities ===
The school also includes Building 8, a Sport Complex, the 80 Punsa Auditorium Chalermprakiat Building (with new canteen and auditorium), gardens, a water pavilion, House of Relief, Hall of Fame, school clinic, Jariyatham, and a football field.
