= Nattayot Pol-yiam =

Thai footballer (born 1997)

Personal information
- Date of birth: 17 April 1997 (age 29)
- Place of birth: Chanthaburi, Thailand
- Height: 1.71 m (5 ft 7 1/2 in)
- Positions: Midfielder; full-back

Youth career
- 2012–2016: Chonburi

Senior career*
| Years | Team | Apps | (Gls) |
| 2017–2022 | Chonburi | 2 | (0) |
| 2019 | → Phuket City (loan) | | |
| 2021 | → Muangkan United (loan) | 12 | (0) |
| 2021–2022 | → Phrae United (loan) | 14 | (1) |
| 2022–2023 | Lampang | 13 | (0) |
| 2023–2024 | Chiangmai | 24 | (1) |
| 2024–2025 | Uthai Thani | 1 | (0) |
| 2025–2026 | Police Tero | 25 | (0) |
- * Club domestic league appearances and goals as of 18 May 2026

Nattayot Pol-yiam (Thai: ณัฏฐยศ พลเยี่ยม, born April 17, 1997) is a Thai professional footballer who plays as a midfielder or full-back.
