= Alongkorn Prathumwong =

Thai footballer (born 1986)

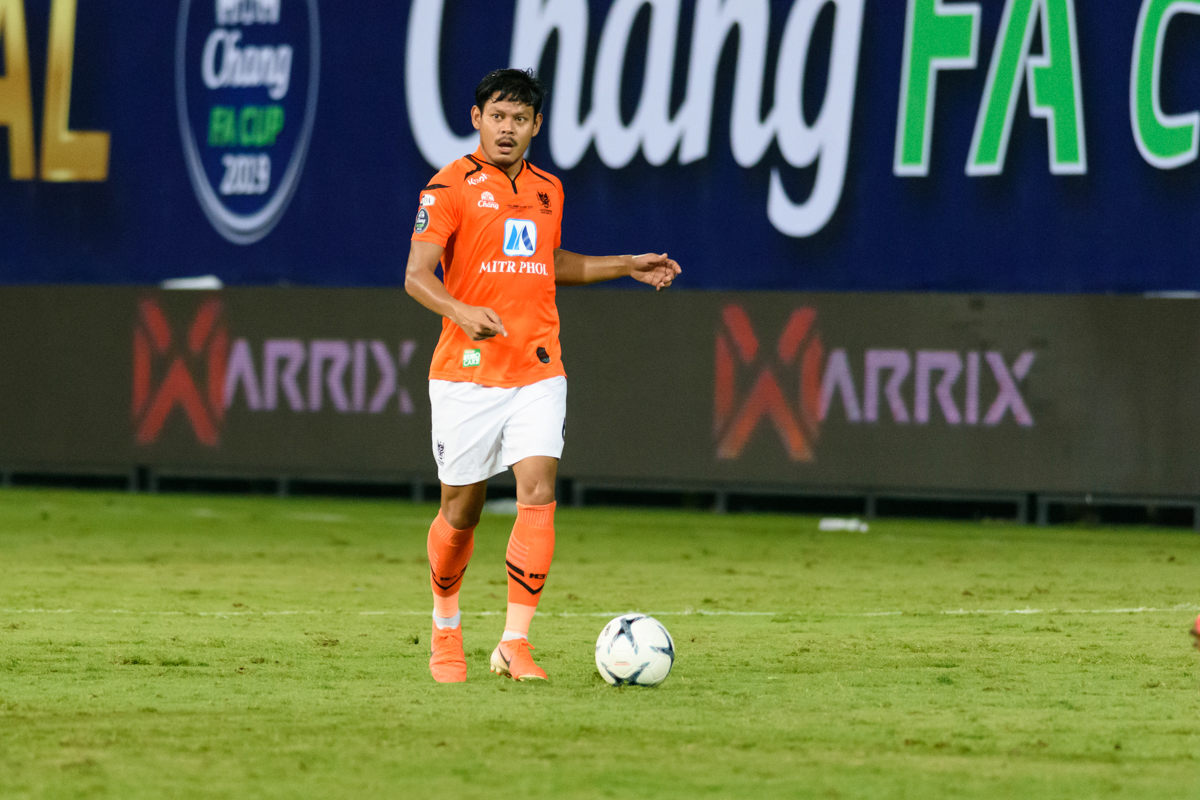

Personal information
- Full name: Alongkorn Prathumwong
- Date of birth: 28 June 1986 (age 40)
- Place of birth: Prachinburi, Thailand
- Height: 1.73 m (5 ft 8 in)
- Position: Left-back

Senior career*
Years	Team	Apps	(Gls)
2007–2008	Rajpracha	13	(1)
2009–2013	Krung Thonburi	21	(3)
2014	Sisaket	33	(1)
2015–2019	Chonburi	84	(0)
2019–2020	Ratchaburi Mitr Phol	6	(0)
2020–2021	Sisaket	15	(0)
Total		172	(5)
- * Club domestic league appearances and goals

Alongkorn Prathumwong (Thai: อลงกรณ์ ประทุมวงศ์, born 28 June 1986), simply known as Jack (Thai: แจ็ค), is a Thai retired professional footballer who plays as a left-back.
