= Kanu (footballer, born 1985) =

Brazilian footballer

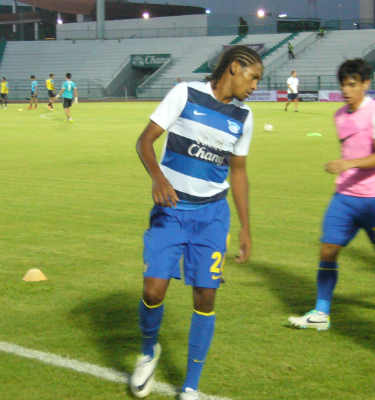

Personal information
- Date of birth: December 29, 1985 (age 40)
- Place of birth: Brazil
- Height: 1.86 m (6 ft 1 in)
- Position: Centre back

Senior career*
Years	Team	Apps	(Gls)
2005–2008	Porto de Caruaru	7	(3)
2008–2010	Criciúma	37	(4)
2008	→ Acadêmica Vitória (loan)		
2010–2011	Buriram United	41	(11)
2012–2016	Chonburi	150	(18)
2017	Shimizu S-Pulse	10	(0)
2018–2019	Suphanburi	40	(2)
- * Club domestic league appearances and goals as of 7 January 2018 ‡ National team caps and goals as of 1 December 2010

Anderson dos Santos (born 29 December 1985), known as Kanu is a Brazilian former footballer. He is the assistant coach of Thai League 1 club Buriram United.

== Honours ==
=== Buriram PEA ===
- Thai Premier League (1): 2011
- Thai FA Cup (1) : 2011
- Thai League Cup (1): 2011
