= Korean name =

Hong Gil-dong, a generic Korean name used similarly to "John Doe" in English. From the top, the name is written in Hangul, then Hanja, then in Latin text using the Revised Romanization system. Surname (홍; Hong) Given name (길동; Gil-dong)

Korean names are names that place their origin in, or are used in, Korea. A Korean name in the modern era typically consists of a surname followed by a given name, with no middle names. A number of Korean terms for names exist. For full names, sŏngmyŏng (Korean: 성명; Hanja: 姓名), sŏngham (성함; 姓銜), or irŭm (이름) are commonly used. When a Korean name is written in Hangul, there is usually no space between the surname and the given name.

Most Korean surnames are monosyllabic, although multisyllabic surnames exist (e.g. Namgung, Hwangbo). In South Korea, upon marriage, both partners keep their full names, but children inherit the father's surname unless otherwise specified during the marriage registration process. Koreans have been historically grouped into Korean clans. Each clan is identified by a pon'gwan (본관; birthplace of the clan's founder) and the surname of the founder of the clan (with descendency determined patrilineally). For example, the Jeonju Yi clan comes from Jeonju and descends from Yi Han. In 2000, a census showed that, in total, there were 286 surnames and 4,179 clans. However, the four most common surnames (Kim, Lee, Park, and Choi) are shared by nearly half of South Koreans.

Given names usually have two syllables, although names with one, three, or more syllables also exist. Generation names (where names for a generation of a family are related in some way, usually by sharing a character) are also traditional, although now increasingly less common. In North Korea, the generational syllable is shared only among siblings, but in the South, it is shared by all members of the same generation. The use of given names is guided by a strict system of honorifics; it can be rude to refer to a stranger or person of higher social status by their given name. Perceived gender in names is less consistent than in Western names.

Naming practices have changed over time. Surnames were once exclusively used by royalty and nobility, but eventually became acceptable for lower class usage. Even until 1910, more than half of Koreans did not have a surname. While now significantly less common, Confucian and cultural traditions dictate systems of naming taboos, childhood names, courtesy names, art names, and posthumous names. Until the invention of the Korean alphabet Hangul in the 15th century, most Korean names were written using Chinese characters (Hanja). While many names can still be written entirely in Hanja, some are now exclusively written in Hangul (e.g. Da-som). In 2015, 7.7% of people had Hangul-only names. During the Japanese occupation of Korea, beginning in 1939, Koreans were forced to adopt Japanese names and naming practices. They were allowed to return to using Korean names following the 1945 liberation of Korea.

== Terms ==
Diagram showing terminology for names, with Latin text written using Revised Romanization

A number of terms exist for Korean names. For the full name, sŏngmyŏng (성명; 姓名) is commonly used. This is a compound word; sŏng (성; 姓) refers to the surname, and myŏng (명; 名) to the given name. The native Korean term irŭm (이름) can be used to refer to either the full name or the given name.

A more formal term for the full name is sŏngham (성함; 姓銜). This term is relatively commonly used during transactions or in official settings. It is commonly said in the phrase "성함이 어떻게 되세요?"; lit. '"What is your name?"'.

Over half of South Koreans have the following five surnames (English spelling variations grouped together): Kim, Gim, Ghim Lee, Yi, Rhee, Yie Park, Pak, Bahk Choi, Choe Jung, Jeong, Chung, Cheong Other

== Surnames ==
The five most common surnames
Korean	Hanja	Revised	MR	Common spellings
김	金	Gim	Kim	Kim, Gim
이	李	I	I	Lee, Rhee, Yi
박	朴	Bak	Pak	Park, Pak, Bak
최	崔	Choe	Ch'oe	Choi, Choe, Chue
정	鄭	Jeong	Chŏng	Jung, Chung, Jeong, Cheong

Fewer than 300 (approximately 280) Korean surnames were in use in 2000, and the three most common (Kim, Lee, and Park) account for nearly half of the population. For various reasons, the number of Korean surnames has been increasing over time.

Each Korean person belongs to a Korean clan. Each clan can be identified by a surname from a patrilineal ancestor and a place of origin (본관; pon'gwan). For example, the most populous clan is the Gimhae Kim clan: they descend from Kim Suro and identify the city of Gimhae as their origin. Clans are further subdivided into various p'a (파; 派), or branches stemming from a more recent common ancestor, so that a full identification of a person's surname would be clan-surname-branch. Until 2005, marrying other members of one's clan was illegal, although this restriction was declared unconstitutional and lifted.

In the premodern, patriarchal Korean society, people were extremely conscious of familial values and their own family identities. Korean women keep their surnames after marriage based on traditional reasoning that it is inherited from their parents and ancestors, and cannot be changed. According to traditions, each clan publishes a comprehensive genealogy book (족보; 族譜; chokpo) every 30 years. Around a dozen two-syllable surnames are used, all of which rank after the 100 most common surnames. The five most common surnames, which together make up over half of the Korean population, are used by over 20 million people in South Korea.

=== History ===
Historically, surnames were exclusive to royalty and nobility in ancient Korea, only gradually filtering down to the general population during the Goryeo era (918–1392). The lowest classes, including slaves, remained without surnames until much later. During the Joseon era (1392–1910), particularly after devastating wars like the Imjin War (1592–1598), the government began selling official positions and even aristocratic status to commoners to raise funds. This created an opportunity for social mobility. Newly wealthy commoners would often fabricate illustrious family histories, fabricating chokpo (family trees) to insert themselves into prominent clans, sometimes claiming Chinese ancestry to avoid scrutiny. This led to a widespread industry of chokpo forgery.

Crucially, the practice of selling status eventually extended to the lowest classes, allowing them to purchase commoner status and, with it, the right to adopt surnames. This contributed to a significant erosion of the class system. By the time the class system was officially abolished in 1894, nearly all Koreans had adopted surnames. This historical trend explains the high concentration of a few common surnames, as many simply adopted popular, prestigious names.

=== Modern era ===
After the 2015 census, it was revealed that foreign-origin surnames were becoming more common in South Korea, due to naturalised citizens transcribing their surnames in Hangul. Between 2000 and 2015, more than 4,800 new surnames were registered. During the census, a total of 5,582 distinct surnames were collected, 73% of which do not have corresponding Hanja characters. It was also revealed that despite the surge in the number of surnames, the ratio of top 10 surnames had not changed. 44.6% of South Koreans are still named Kim, Lee or Park, while the rest of the top 10 are made up of Choi, Jeong, Kang, Jo, Yoon, Jang and Lim.

Children traditionally (and still mostly) take their father's surname. However, under South Korean Civil Law effective January 1, 2008, children may be legally given the surname of either parent or even that of a step-parent.

== Given names ==
Traditionally, given names are partly determined by generation names, a custom originating in China. One of the two characters in a given name is unique to the individual, while the other is shared by all people in a family generation. In both North and South Koreas, generational names are usually no longer shared by cousins, but are still commonly shared by siblings.

Given names are typically composed of Hanja, or Chinese characters. In North Korea, the Hanja are no longer used to write the names, but the meanings are still understood; for example, the syllable ch'ŏl (철) in boys' names is usually perceived as 鐵, which means "iron".

In South Korea, Article 37 of the Regulations on Registration of Family Relations (가족관계의 등록 등에 관한 규칙) requires that the Hanja in personal names be taken from a restricted list. Unapproved Hanja must be represented by Hangul in the family relations register (가족관계등록부). In March 1991, the Supreme Court of Korea published the List of Hanja for Use in Personal Names (인명용 한자표; 人名用漢字表) (Note: Also called the List of Additional Hanja for Use in Personal Names (인명용 추가 한자표; 人名用追加漢字表).) which allowed a total of 2,854 Hanja in new South Korean given names (as well as 61 variant forms), and put it into effect starting April 1 of the same year. The list was expanded several times; the latest update was in 2024. Currently, more than 9,300 Hanja are permitted in South Korean names (including the set of basic Hanja), in addition to a small number of variant forms. The use of an official list is similar to Japan's use of the jinmeiyō kanji (although the characters do not entirely coincide).

The List of Hanja for Use in Personal Names merely shows what characters are currently allowed to be registered. It cannot always be used to determine someone's existing Hanja name because of the following reasons:

- People who were named before April 1, 1991, did not have any restrictions on Hanja names. Their names can contain Hanja that are not even in the list.
- The list is sometimes updated to include more Hanja. A character currently in the list may not be in older versions of the list.

While the traditional practice is still largely followed, since the late 1970s, some parents have given their children names that are native Korean words, usually of two syllables. Given names of this sort include Ha-neul (하늘; lit. 'heaven/sky'), Da-som (다솜; lit. 'love') and Bit-na (빛나; lit. 'to shine'). Between 2008 and 2015, the proportion of such names among South Korean newborns rose from 3.5% to 7.7%. Another source, citing the Supreme Court Public Relations Office, found the amount in newborns increased from 7.46% in 2013 to a new high of 14.83% in 2022; however, this data also indicated that the increase was mainly due to modern decline in birth rates hitting Chinese character names disproportionally hard, as they fell from 410,000 down to 210,000, whereas native Korean names only rose moderately, from 33,000 to 37,000. Despite this trend away from traditional practice, people's names are still recorded in both Hangul and Hanja (if available) on official documents, in family genealogies, and so on.

Unless a given name contains a syllable that does not have any corresponding Hanja at all (e.g. 빛; bit), there is no guarantee that a name which may look like a native Korean name never has Hanja. A certain name written in Hangul can be a native Korean name, or a Sino-Korean name, or even both. For example, Bo-ram (보람) can not only be a native Korean name, but can also be a Sino-Korean name (e.g. 寶濫). In some cases, parents intend a dual meaning: both the meaning from a native Korean word and the meaning from Hanja.

Originally, there was no legal limitation on the length of names in South Korea. As a result, some people registered extremely long given names, such as the 16-syllable Haneulbyeolnimgureumhaetnimbodasarangseureouri (하늘별님구름햇님보다사랑스러우리; roughly, "more beloved than the sky, stars, clouds, and the sun"). However, beginning in 1993, new regulations required that the given name be five syllables or shorter.

A family relations certificate (가족관계증명서) of an individual lists the person concerned, the person's parents, spouse, and children. If there is more than one person with the same name in a family relations certificate, it is difficult to identify the person. Therefore, an individual is not allowed to have the same name as someone appearing in one's parent's family relations certificate – in other words, a child cannot have the same name as one's parents and grandparents.

=== Gender ===
Korean given names' correlation to gender is complex and, by comparison to European languages, less consistent. For example, Park Ji-hoon is male and Shin Ji-hoon is female; Lee Su-jin (director) is male and Lee Su-jin (politician, born November 1969) is female.

Certain Sino-Korean syllables carry masculine connotations, others feminine, and others unisex. These connotations may vary depending on whether the character is used as the first or second character in the given name. A tollimcha generational marker, once confined to male descendants but now sometimes used for women as well, may further complicate gender identification. Native Korean given names show similar variation.

A further complication in Korean text is that the singular pronoun used to identify individuals has no gender. This means that automated translation often misidentifies or fails to identify an individual's gender in Korean text and thus presents stilted or incorrect English output. (Conversely, English source text is similarly missing information about social status and age critical to smooth Korean-language rendering.)

== Usage ==
=== Forms of address ===
The usage of names is governed by strict norms in traditional Korean society. It is generally considered rude to address people by their given names in Korean culture. This is particularly the case when dealing with adults or one's elders. It is acceptable to call someone by his or her given name if he or she is the same age as the speaker. However, it is considered rude to use someone's given name if that person's age is a year older than the speaker. This is often a source of pragmatic difficulty for learners of Korean as a foreign language, and for Korean learners of Western languages.

A variety of replacements are used for the actual name of the person. It is acceptable among adults of similar status to address the other by their full name, with the suffix ssi (씨; 氏) added. However, it is inappropriate to address someone by the surname alone, even with such a suffix. Whenever the person has an official rank, it is typical to address him or her by the name of that rank (such as "Manager"), often with the honorific nim (님) added. In such cases, the full name of the person may be appended, although this can also imply the speaker is of higher status.

Among children and close friends, it is common to use a person's birth name.

=== Traditional nicknames ===
Among the common people, who have suffered from high child mortality, children were often given childhood names (아명; 兒名; amyŏng), to wish them long lives by avoiding notice from the messenger of death. These have become less common.

After marriage, women usually lost their amyŏng, and were called by a t'aekho (택호; 宅號), referring to their town of origin.

In addition, teknonymy, or referring to parents by their children's names, is a common practice. It is most commonly used in referring to a mother by the name of her eldest child, as in "Minsu's mom" (민수 엄마). However, it can be extended to either parent and any child, depending upon the context.

== On computer systems using the legacy character set ==
Some Hangul names are not smoothly processed on some computer systems in South Korea. Unicode provides 11,172 precomposed Hangul syllabic blocks, but the South Korean legacy character set KS X 1001 only supports 2,350 of them. Because of this, people whose names contain Hangul characters not in KS X 1001 (e.g. 믜) experience difficulties on computer systems that still use the legacy character set.

== Romanization ==
Many modern Koreans romanize their names in an ad hoc manner that often attempts to approximate conventions in English orthography. For example,

- "u" for the vowel ㅓ ([ʌ]) in a closed syllable: Han Sun-hwa (한선화), Park Ji-sung (박지성), Sim Sang-jung (심상정)
- "oo" for the vowel ㅜ ([u]): Han Dong-hoon (한동훈), Jin Ki-joo (진기주), Kim Moon-soo (김문수)
- "young" for the syllable 영 ([jʌŋ]): Hong Jin-young (홍진영), Jang Won-young (장원영), Kim Young-sam (김영삼)

Some Koreans avoid certain spellings because of their similarity to English words with negative connotations. For example, "Gang", "Bang", "Sin", and "Gun". South Korean president Roh Moo-hyun previously romanized his surname "Noh", but switched to spelling it "Roh" to avoid associations between it and the English word "no".

The three most common surnames 김, 이, and 박 are almost always rendered as Kim, Lee, and Park respectively.

- The initial sound in Kim shares features with both the English k (in initial position, an aspirated voiceless velar stop) and "hard g" (an unaspirated voiced velar stop). When pronounced initially, Kim starts with an unaspirated voiceless velar stop sound; it is voiceless like [k], but also unaspirated like [ɡ]. As aspiration is a distinctive feature in Korean but voicing is not, Gim is more likely to be understood correctly. However, Kim is usually used as the romanized form.
- In Korean, the surname that is usually romanized as Lee actually has no L sound; its pronunciation is simply the English vowel sound for the "long e", as in see. For this reason, this surname is also often romanized as Yi.
- In Korean, the surname that is usually romanized as Park actually has no r sound, unlike in American English, since the romanization is based on English English, which has r-dropping. Its initial sound is an unaspirated voiceless bilabial stop [p]. The vowel is [a], similar to the a in father, so this surname is also often transcribed Pak, Bak and Bahk.

In romanized Korean names, the syllables of a given name is

- simply concatenated (Hong Gildong), or
- separated by a hyphen (Hong Gil-dong), or
- separated by a space (Hong Gil Dong).
  - Even with a space, Gil Dong is still a single first name, not first and middle names.

In other words, Gildong, Gil-dong, and Gil Dong are all the same given name.

It is not always possible to unambiguously determine the original Hangul name from a romanized Korean name. For example, the "jung" in Kim Dae-jung and in Youn Yuh-jung is actually different in Hangul (중 and 정 respectively); the "Chun" in Chun Doo-hwan and in Chun Woo-hee is actually different in Hangul (전 and 천 respectively). (Note: Even if the Revised Romanization of Korean (RR) were strictly applied to all names, such an ambiguity is not fully resolved. For example, given names 빛나 and 샛별 are romanized as Bitna and Saetbyeol respectively according to RR – syllable-final consonants ㅊ and ㅅ both become t.)

=== Name order ===
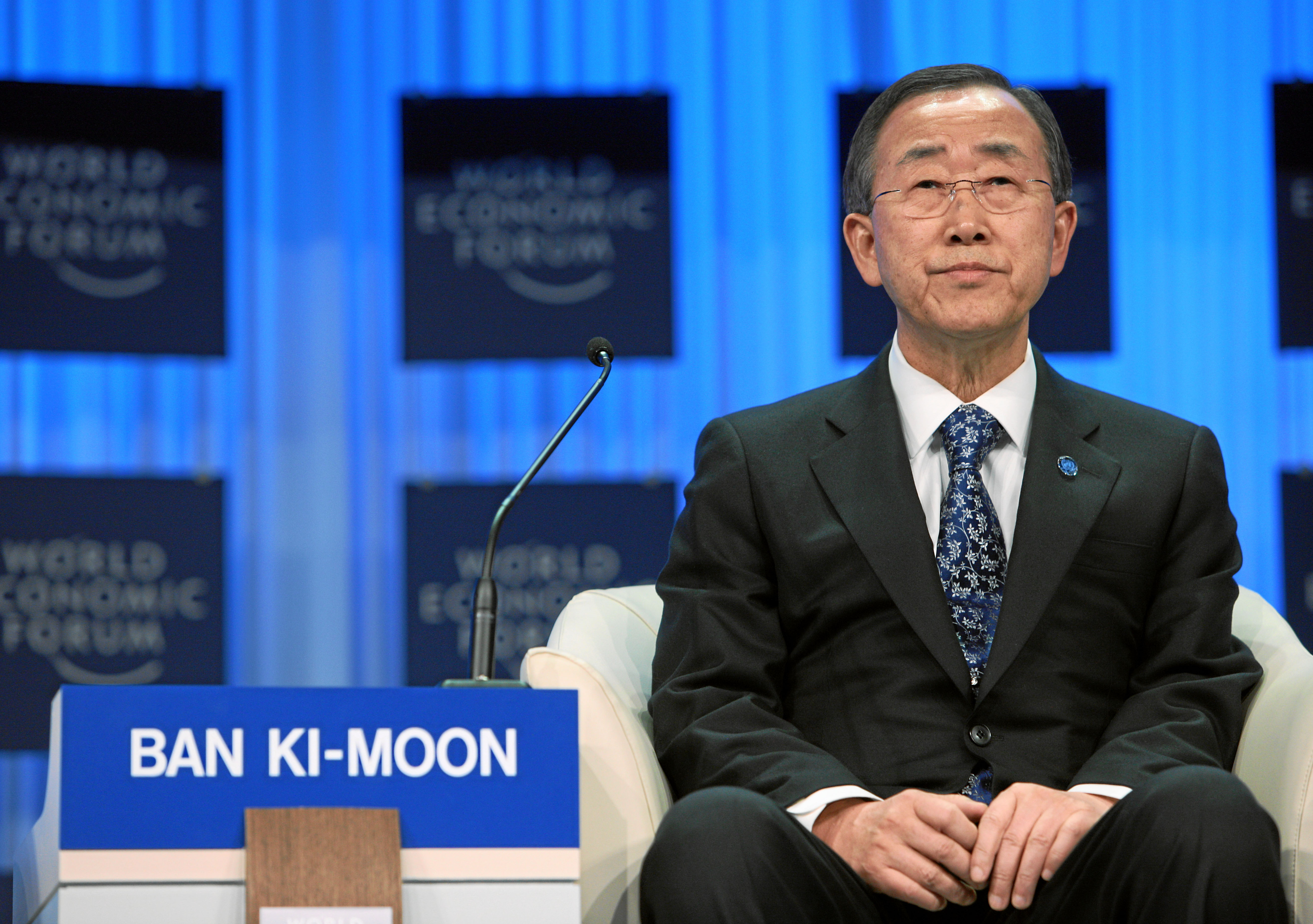
Ban Ki-moon in Davos, Switzerland – the usual presentation of Korean names in English, as shown here, is to put the surname first (Ban is the surname)

In English-language publications, including newspapers, Korean names are usually written in the original order, with the surname first and the given name last. However, Koreans living and working in Western countries usually adopt the Western order, with the given name first and the surname last. The usual presentation of Korean names in English is similar to those of Chinese names and differs from those of Japanese names, which, in English publications, are usually written in a reversed order with the surname last.

=== Romanizations on South Korean passports ===
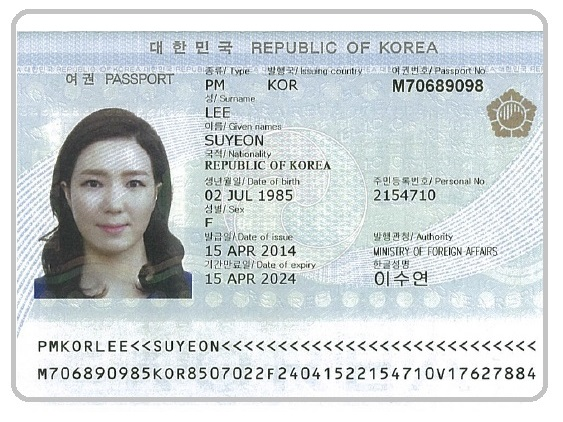
A specimen of the identity information page of a South Korean passport, displaying the romanization of the bearer's name (Lee Suyeon) for international legibility.

For romanizations of names on passports, the South Korean government recommends (but generally does not strictly require) a number of modifications to the Revised Romanization ("RR") system. Passport romanizations are subject to approval by the South Korean government. These requirements have been enforced with varying strictness over time; they were once stricter, with the Ministry of Foreign Affairs rejecting applications with romanizations it deemed too unorthodox, but a number of legal cases have resulted in the easing of enforcement. The South Korean government offers an automatic romanization tool that converts Hangul names to recommended passport romanizations.

Recommendations for passport romanizations:

- Romanizations that "obviously [have] a negative meaning" in other languages are discouraged. For example, 신 is recommended to be romanized as SHIN and not the strict RR form SIN (spelled the same as sin, despite being pronounced differently).
- Ad-hoc romanizations like YOUNG for 영 are allowed.
- The default for given names is the concatenated form (e.g. "GILDONG" for 길동; no hyphens or spaces).
  - Hyphens or spaces in given names are discouraged. The Ministry of Foreign Affairs allows people to apply to change their romanization to remove hyphens or spaces.
    - For an unknown reason, the South Korean government had been inserting a space between syllables of a given name (e.g. "GIL DONG" for 길동) by default. Because of the space, the second syllable in a given name is frequently misunderstood as a middle name (and thus frequently omitted) outside of Korea. This causes inconvenience and confusion – people sharing the same surname and the same first syllable of their given names end up having the same name; this even includes siblings. According to the Ministry of Foreign Affairs, the default for given names was changed to the concatenated form in December 2004. The Ministry later officially admitted that having a space in a given name can be misunderstood as having first and middle names; it also officially stated that it recommends concatenating syllables, and that anyone who already has a space in one's given name can have the space removed.
- Assimilation between syllables is not reflected.
- If a Korean given name is a Hangul transcription of a name or word in another language, and the transcription is sufficiently faithful to the original, it is permitted to use the original spelling. For example, 에스더 is a Hangul transcription of "Esther"; it is allowed to be romanized as ESTHER (not necessarily the RR form ESEUDEO).
  - However, if the Hangul transcription is sufficiently different from a form in another language (especially happens with Biblical names), its romanization should be based on the Korean pronunciation. For example, 다윗 (Dawit in RR) is a Biblical name equivalent to "David" in English; this is deemed too different from "David", so a spelling such as DAWIT is asked for instead.
    - Using ETHAN for 이든 is not allowed.

Exceptions can apply to most of the above. For example, if a person had been using a non-standard spelling abroad and changing it would inconvenience them, they could be granted permission to use that spelling.

Even a single surname within a single family can be romanized differently on passports. For example, within a single 심 family, the father's surname can be "Shim" while his son's can be "Sim".

According to a 2007 examination of 63,000 passports, the most common romanizations for various common surnames were:

Surname (Hangul)	Spelling 1	Spelling 2	Spelling 3
김	Kim (99.3%)	Gim (0.6%)	Ghim (0.01%)
이	Lee (98.5%)	Yi (1%)	Rhee (0.2%)
박	Park (95.9%)	Bak (1.8%)	Pak (1.7%)
최	Choi (93.1%)	Choe (6.5%)	Choy (0.09%)
정	Jung (48.6%)	Jeong (37%)	Chung (9.2%)

== History ==
The use of names has evolved over time. The first recording of Korean names appeared as early as in the early Three Kingdoms period. The adoption of Chinese characters contributed to Korean names. A complex system, including courtesy names, art names, posthumous names, and childhood names, arose out of Confucian tradition. The courtesy name system in particular arose from the Classic of Rites, a core text of the Confucian canon. Names have also been influenced by naming taboos, a practice that originated in China.

During the Three Kingdoms period, native given names were sometimes composed of three syllables like Misahŭn (미사흔) and Sadaham (사다함), which were later transcribed into Hanja (未斯欣 and 斯多含). The use of surnames was limited to kings in the beginning, but gradually spread to aristocrats and eventually to most of the population.

Some recorded surnames are apparently native Korean words, such as toponyms. At that time, some characters of Korean names might have been read not by their Sino-Korean pronunciation, but by their native reading. For example, the native Korean name of Yŏn Kaesomun (연개소문; 淵蓋蘇文), the first Grand Prime Minister of Goguryeo, can linguistically be reconstructed as [*älkɑsum]. Early Silla names are also believed to represent Old Korean vocabulary; for example, Bak Hyeokgeose, the name of the founder of Silla, was pronounced something like Pulgŏnuri (弗矩內), which can be translated as "bright world".

In older traditions, if the name of a baby is not chosen by the third trimester, the responsibility of choosing the name fell to the oldest son of the family. Often, this was the preferred method as the name chosen was seen as good luck.

According to the chronicle Samguk sagi, surnames were bestowed by kings upon their supporters. For example, in 33 CE, King Yuri gave the six headmen of Saro (later Silla) the names Lee (이), Bae (배), Choi (최), Jeong (정), Son (손) and Seol (설). However, this account is not generally credited by modern historians, who hold that Confucian-style surnames as above were more likely to have come into general use in the fifth and subsequent centuries, as the Three Kingdoms increasingly adopted the Chinese model.

Only a handful of figures from the Three Kingdoms period are recorded as having borne a courtesy name, such as Seol Chong. The custom only became widespread in the Goryeo period, as Confucianism took hold among the literati. (Note: Seol Chong's courtesy name, Ch'ongji (총지) is reported in the Samguk sagi, Yŏlchŏn 6, "Seol Chong".) In 1055, Goryeo established a new law limiting access to the civil service examination to those without surnames.

For men of the aristocratic yangban class, a complex system of alternate names emerged by the Joseon period. On the other hand, commoners typically only had given names. Surnames were originally a privilege reserved for the yangban class, but members of the middle and common classes of Joseon society frequently paid to acquire a surname from a yangban and be included into a clan; this practice became rampant by the 18th century, leading to a significant growth in the yangban class but conversely diluting and weakening its social dominance. For instance, in the region of Daegu, the yangban who had comprised 9.2% of Daegu's demographics in 1690 rose to 18.7% in 1729, 37.5% in 1783, and 70.3% in 1858. It was not until the Kabo Reform of 1894 that members of the outcast class were allowed to adopt a surname. According to a census called the minjŏkpu (민적부; 民籍簿) completed in 1910, more than half of the Korean population did not have a surname at the time.

For a brief period after the Mongol invasion of Korea during the Goryeo period, Korean kings and aristocrats had both Mongolian and Sino-Korean names. The scions of the ruling class were sent to the Yuan court for schooling. For example, King Gongmin had both the Mongolian name Bayan Temür (伯顏帖木兒) and the Sino-Korean name Wang Ki (王祺) (later renamed Wang Chŏn (王顓)).

=== Japanese colonial period ===
During the period of Japanese colonial rule of Korea (1910–1945), Koreans were forced to adopt Japanese-language names. Even today, it is common for Korean nationals living in Japan to use Japanese surnames as well. Also known as tsūshōmei (通称名) or tsūmei (通名), such an alternative name can be registered as a legal alias and used in many official contexts including bank accounts and health insurance.

In 1939, as part of Governor-General Jirō Minami's policy of cultural assimilation (同化政策, dōka seisaku), Ordinance No. 20 (commonly called the "Name Order", or sōshi-kaimei (創氏改名) in Japanese) was issued, and became law in April 1940. Although the Japanese Governor-General officially prohibited compulsion, low-level officials effectively forced Koreans to adopt Japanese-style surnames and given names. By 1944, about 84% of the population had registered Japanese surnames.

Sōshi (Japanese) means the creation of a Japanese surname (shi, Korean ssi), distinct from a Korean surname or sŏng (Japanese sei). Japanese surnames represent the families they belong to and can be changed by marriage and other procedures, while Korean surnames represent paternal linkages and are unchangeable. Japanese policy dictated that Koreans either could register a completely new Japanese surname unrelated to their Korean surname, or have their Korean surname, in Japanese form, automatically become their Japanese name if no surname was submitted before the deadline.

After the liberation of Korea from Japanese rule, the Name Restoration Order (조선 성명 복구령; 朝鮮姓名復舊令) was issued on October 23, 1946, by the United States military administration south of the 38th parallel north, enabling Koreans to restore their original Korean names if they wished.

Japanese conventions of creating given names, such as using "子" (Japanese ko (こ) and Korean ja (자)) in feminine names, are seldom seen in present-day Korea, both North and South. In the North, a campaign to eradicate such Japanese-based names was launched in the 1970s. In the South these names are regarded as old and unsophisticated.

== See also ==
- Article 809 of the Korean Civil Code
- List of Korean given names
- List of Korean surnames
- Korean clans
- Chinese name
- List of common Chinese surnames
- Japanese name
- List of common Japanese surnames
