= Son Heung-min =

South Korean footballer (born 1992)

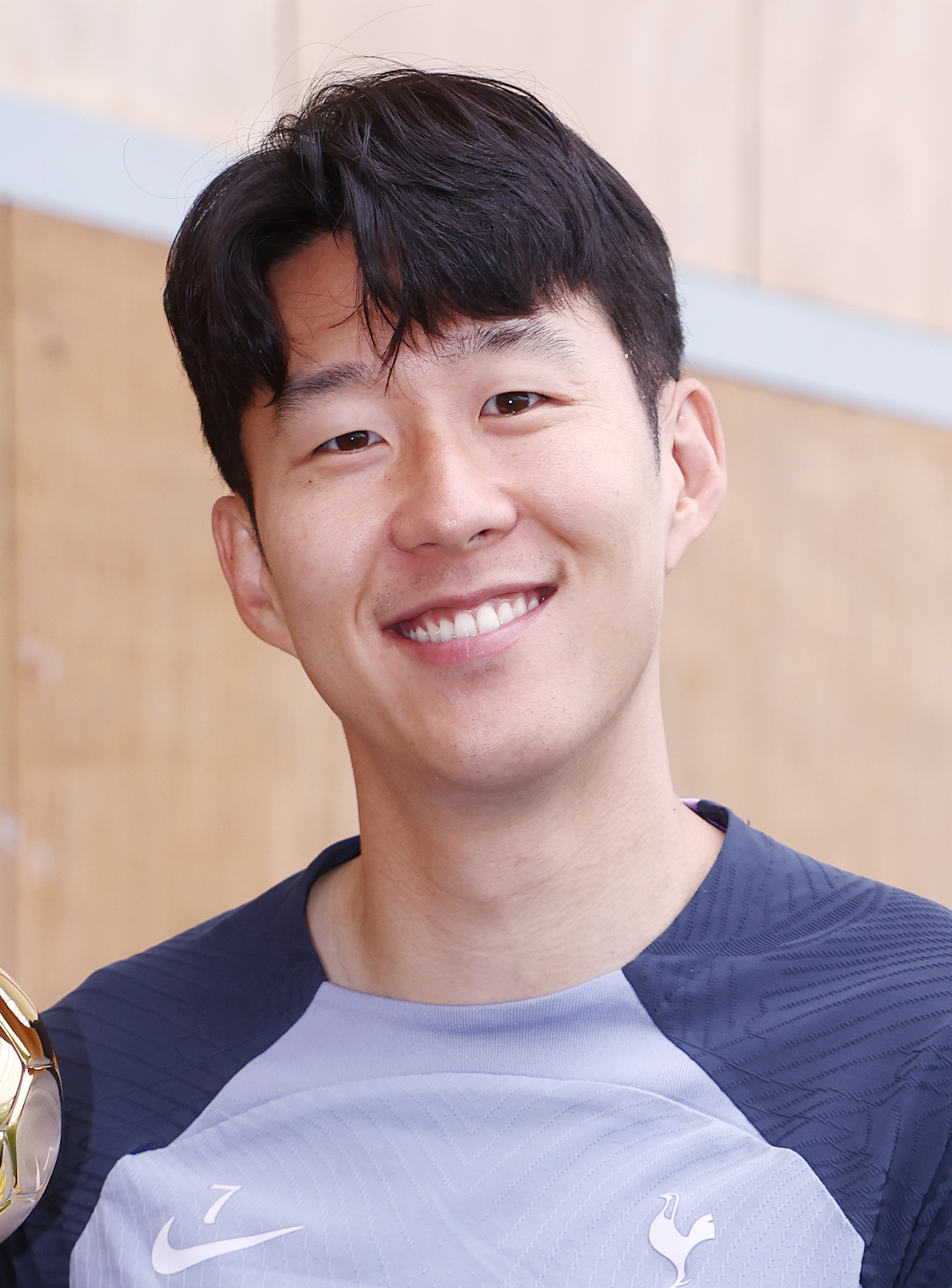
- Son with Tottenham Hotspur in 2024

Personal information
- Full name: Son Heung-min
- Date of birth: 8 July 1992 (age 34)
- Place of birth: Chuncheon, Gangwon, South Korea
- Height: 1.83 m (6 ft 0 in)
- Position: Forward

Team information
- Current team: Los Angeles FC
- Number: 7

Youth career
- 2006–2007: Yukminkwan Middle School
- 2007: Dongbuk Middle School
- 2008: FC Seoul (Note: Played for Dongbuk High School, which was an academy of FC Seoul.)
- 2008–2010: Hamburger SV

Senior career*
| Years | Team | Apps | (Gls) |
| 2010 | Hamburger SV II | 6 | (1) |
| 2010–2013 | Hamburger SV | 73 | (20) |
| 2013–2015 | Bayer Leverkusen | 62 | (21) |
| 2015–2025 | Tottenham Hotspur | 333 | (127) |
| 2025– | Los Angeles FC | 41 | (16) |

International career^{‡}
| 2008–2009 | South Korea U17 | 18 | (7) |
| 2016–2018 | South Korea U23 | 10 (Note: Appearances as an overage player (four appearances and two goals in Summer Olympics, six appearances and one goal in Asian Games)) | (3) |
| 2010– | South Korea | 153 | (59) |
Medal record
Men's football
Representing South Korea
AFC Asian Cup
| Runner-up | 2015 Australia |
| Third place | 2011 Qatar |
Asian Games
| Gold medal – first place | 2018 Jakarta-Palembang |
AFC U-16 Championship
| Runner-up | 2008 Uzbekistan |
Korean name
| Hangul | 손흥민 |
| Hanja | 孫興慜 |
| RR | Son Heungmin |
| MR | Son Hŭngmin |
| IPA | [son.ɦɯŋ.min] |
- * Club domestic league appearances and goals as of 7 November 2026 (UTC) ‡ National team caps and goals as of 17 November 2026 (UTC)

Son Heung-min (Korean: 손흥민; pronounced [son.ɣɯŋ.min]; born 8 July 1992) (Note: Traditionally, Korean names follow Eastern name order (as in Son Heung-min), meaning the surname comes first. However, English speakers and English-speaking media often refer to Son using Western name order (as in Heung-min Son).) is a South Korean professional footballer who plays as a left winger for Major League Soccer club Los Angeles FC and captains the South Korea national team. Known for his speed, finishing, two-footedness, and ability to link play, he is the top Asian goalscorer in both Premier League and UEFA Champions League history, and is widely regarded as the greatest Asian player of all time. (Note: Attributed to multiple references:)

Born in Chuncheon, Gangwon Province, South Korea, Son relocated to Germany to join Hamburger SV at 16, making his debut in the Bundesliga in 2010. In 2013, he moved to Bayer Leverkusen for a club record €10 million before signing for Premier League club Tottenham Hotspur two years later. While at Spurs, Son soon established himself as one of the best forwards in the world. He contributed to the club reaching the Champions League final in 2018–19 and the EFL Cup final in 2020–21. In 2019–20, Son scored a solo effort in the league that earned him the FIFA Puskás Award. In the 2021–22 season, he jointly won the Premier League Golden Boot award with 23 goals, becoming the first Asian player to win it. In April 2023, he became the first Asian player to score 100 Premier League goals. In 2023, Son was appointed as club captain of Tottenham. In 2025, he led Spurs to the UEFA Europa League title, his first major honour, ending a 17-year trophy drought for Spurs in the process.

A full international since 2010, Son is South Korea's record goalscorer and record appearance holder. He has represented South Korea at the FIFA World Cup in 2014, 2018, 2022, and 2026, and is his country's joint top scorer at the tournament, tied with Park Ji-sung and Ahn Jung-hwan on three goals. Son has also represented South Korea at the 2018 Asian Games, where the team won gold, and the 2011, 2015, 2019, and 2023 editions of the AFC Asian Cup; Korea was the runner-up in 2015.

Outside of football, Son is viewed as a symbol of national pride in South Korea for his achievements, and has been listed in Forbes Korea Power Celebrity 40 since 2019, where he ranked second in 2024. In June 2022, Son received the Order of Sport Merit, Cheongnyong class, the highest order of merit for achievement in sports given to a South Korean citizen, for his achievements in football. Son has been credited for having raised the profile of Spurs among South Koreans, with the club's marketing and social media strategy catering extensively to Korean supporters.

== Early life ==
Son Heung-min was born in Chuncheon, South Korea. He is of the Miryang Son clan. His father, Son Woong-jung, is a retired footballer turned manager who once played for the South Korea national B team.

Son came through the academy at FC Seoul, the same club that former Spurs defender Lee Young-pyo played for. Son was a ball boy in an FC Seoul home match in 2008 when he was a FC Seoul youth player. At that time, his role model was midfielder Lee Chung-yong, who played for Crystal Palace and Bolton Wanderers. Apart from his native language Korean, Son is also fluent in German and English. His agent Thies Bliemeister said Son was so determined to succeed in Europe that he learned German by watching episodes of SpongeBob SquarePants.

== Club career ==
=== Hamburger SV ===
In August 2008, Son dropped out of Dongbuk High School's football club (formerly FC Seoul under-18 team) and joined Hamburger SV's youth academy at age 16 through the Korean FA Youth Project. A year later, he returned to South Korea. After participating in the FIFA U-17 World Cup, he formally joined Hamburger SV's youth academy in November 2009.

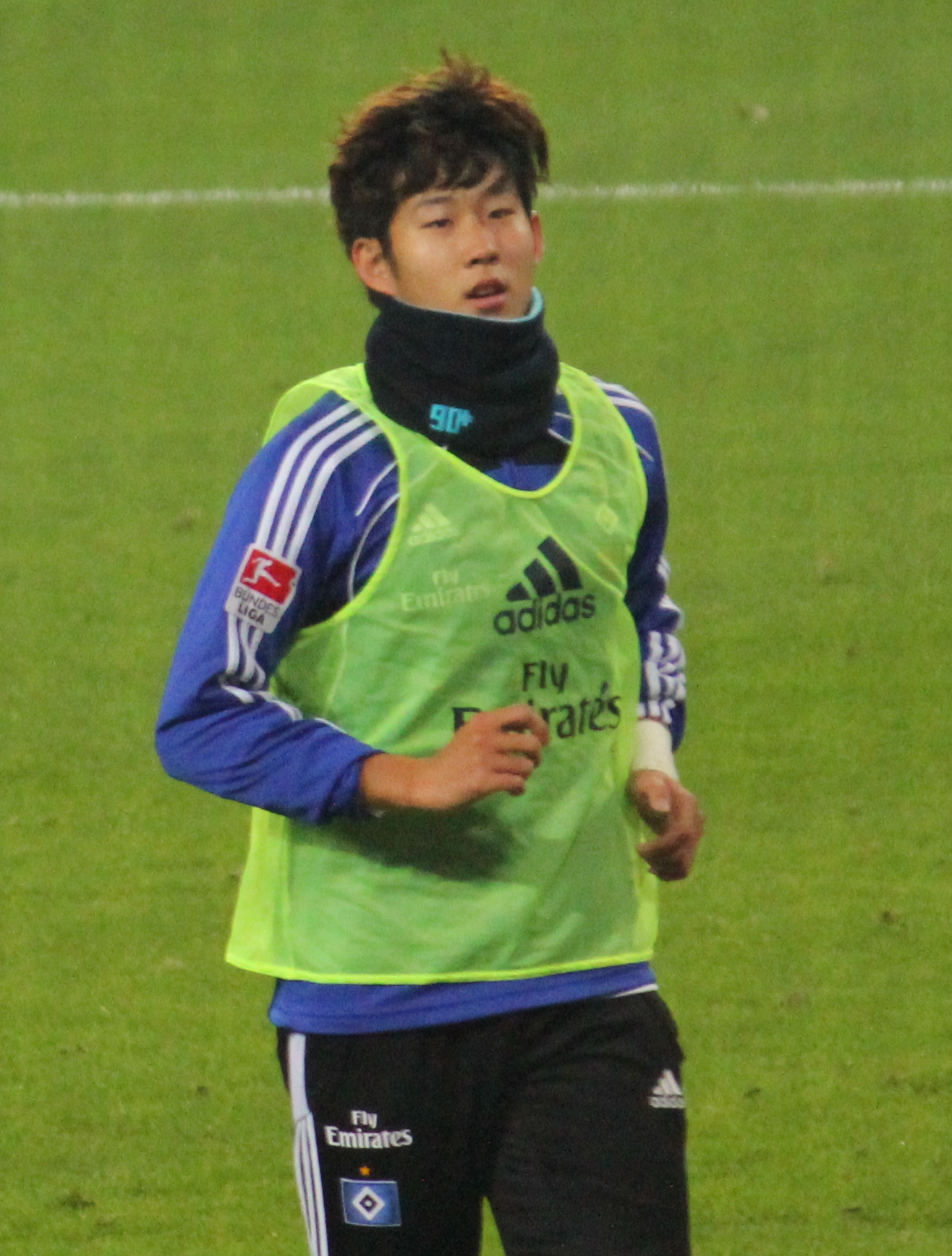
Son warming up for Hamburger SV in 2011

He was impressive in the 2010–11 pre-season, leading the team with nine goals, and signed his first professional contract on his 18th birthday. After scoring against Chelsea in August, he was out for two months due to a foot injury. He returned on 30 October 2010 to score his first league goal, against 1. FC Köln in the 24th minute. The goal made Son the youngest Hamburg player to score a goal in the Bundesliga at 18, breaking the record held by Manfred Kaltz.

Son signed a new deal with Hamburg through 2014. Pundits said he had what it took to become the next Cha Bum-kun, a legendary Bundesliga forward and fellow South Korean. Son scored three goals in 14 matches in all competition during the 2010–11 season.

During the 2011–12 pre-season, Son was explosive, scoring 18 times in only nine matches. After missing the opening match due to a fever, Son scored two goals within three matches. On 27 August, Son picked up an ankle injury in the 4–3 loss to 1. FC Köln and was initially projected to be out of action for four to six weeks. His recovery was quicker than expected and he returned to action only three weeks later as a substitute in a 1–0 loss against Borussia Mönchengladbach on 17 September. Over the course of the 2011–12 season, he made 30 appearances for Hamburg and scored five goals, including crucial goals against Hannover 96 and 1. FC Nürnberg at the end of the season to help ensure that Hamburg remained in the Bundesliga.

Following Hamburger SV's 2012–13 offseason moves, which saw the transfers of the team's strikers Mladen Petrić and Paolo Guerrero to Fulham and Corinthians respectively, manager Thorsten Fink chose to name Son a starter. The 2012–13 season was a breakthrough season for Son as he scored two goals in an away fixture against Borussia Dortmund on 9 February 2013, helping his team to a 4–1 victory. Son was chosen Mann des Tages (Man of the Match) by kicker. On 14 April, Son netted two goals in a 2–1 win against Mainz 05. He finished the season with 12 goals, becoming the fifth South Korean footballer to achieve double digits in goals in Europe. He finished the 2012–13 season with 12 goals in 34 matches in all competitions.

=== Bayer Leverkusen ===
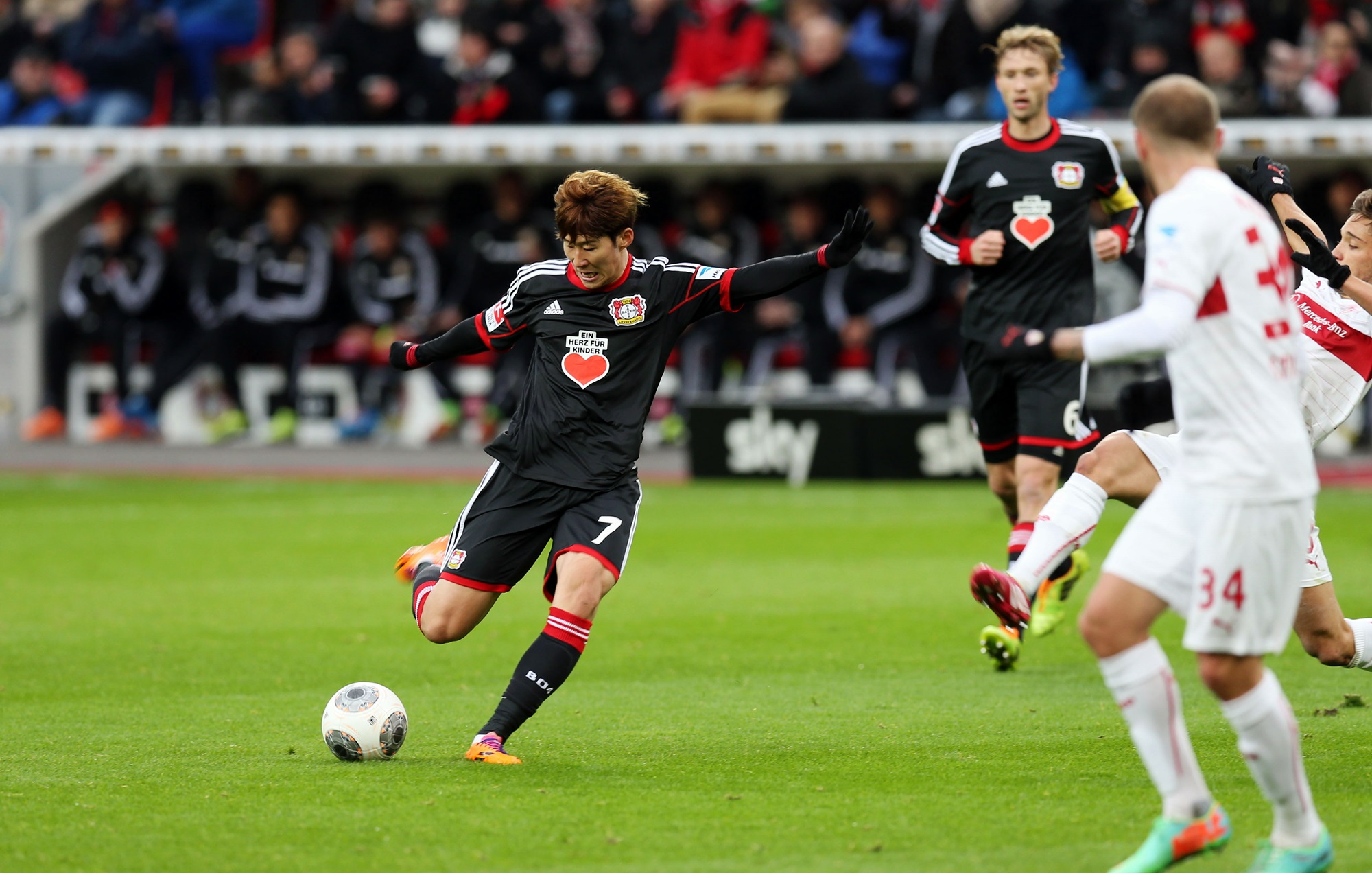
Son playing for Bayer Leverkusen in 2014

On 13 June 2013, Bayer Leverkusen confirmed Son's transfer for reportedly €10 million, which was the highest transfer fee in the club's history at the time. He agreed to a five-year deal with the team. Son adjusted quickly to his new club in the pre-season, scoring three goals in his first three appearances for the team in exhibition matches (against 1860 Munich, Udinese and KAS Eupen respectively).

On 9 November 2013, Son scored a hat-trick for Leverkusen in a 5–3 win against his former club Hamburger SV. On 7 December, Son scored a crucial goal against Borussia Dortmund to put his club just four points off the summit of the Bundesliga. On 10 May 2014, Son scored another goal against Werder Bremen ensuring his team a spot for the 2014–15 UEFA Champions League. He finished the 2013–14 season with 12 goals in 43 matches.

Son scored a hat-trick against VfL Wolfsburg on 14 February 2015, in a 4–5 defeat, scoring when they were losing 0–3. He finished the 2014–15 season with 17 goals in 42 matches.

Despite that productive season, Son's future at Leverkusen became uncertain during the opening weeks of 2015–16 amid negotiations over a move to Tottenham Hotspur. His father, Son Woong-jung, said that they had initially expected him to remain for another one or two seasons but reconsidered because of his increased defensive responsibilities, early substitutions and growing competition for his position. Sporting director Rudi Völler similarly suggested that Son might have become dissatisfied with his status after a difficult start to the season and increased competition for his position. The timing of the move caused friction: although Leverkusen authorised Son to undergo a medical in London, he was absent while the club prepared for the decisive second leg of its UEFA Champions League play-off against Lazio, and Roger Schmidt and Hakan Çalhanoğlu said that he had been poorly advised. Son and his agent denied that he had fallen out with Schmidt or acted without permission, saying that Son himself wanted to join Tottenham and that the final decision was made jointly with his father and agent. In 2022, his father recalled that, after a third round of negotiations broke down, he ran to intercept Leverkusen staff and persuaded them to reopen talks in London.

=== Tottenham Hotspur ===
==== 2015–16: Debut season ====
On 28 August 2015, Son joined Premier League club Tottenham Hotspur for £22 million (€30 million) on a five-year contract, subject to work permit and international clearance. Upon his signing, he became the most expensive Asian player in football history. The record had been held since 2001 by Japanese Hidetoshi Nakata, who transferred from Roma to Parma for €25 million.

Son made his debut on 13 September away to Sunderland, being replaced by Andros Townsend in the 62nd minute of a 1–0 win. In Tottenham's first match of the 2015–16 UEFA Europa League on 17 September, Son netted his first two goals for the club in a 3–1 win against Qarabağ FK. Three days later, he scored his first Premier League goal, against Crystal Palace at White Hart Lane, netting in the 68th minute to give Tottenham their first home Premier League win of the season. On 28 December in the match against Watford, Son replaced Tom Carroll in the 80th minute and scored Tottenham's winning goal in the 89th minute. On 2 May, he scored the second goal against Chelsea in a crucial match to give Spurs hope of winning the Premier League. Chelsea equalised in the second half, however, handing over the title to Leicester City.

==== 2016–17: Breakthrough and Premier League runner-up ====
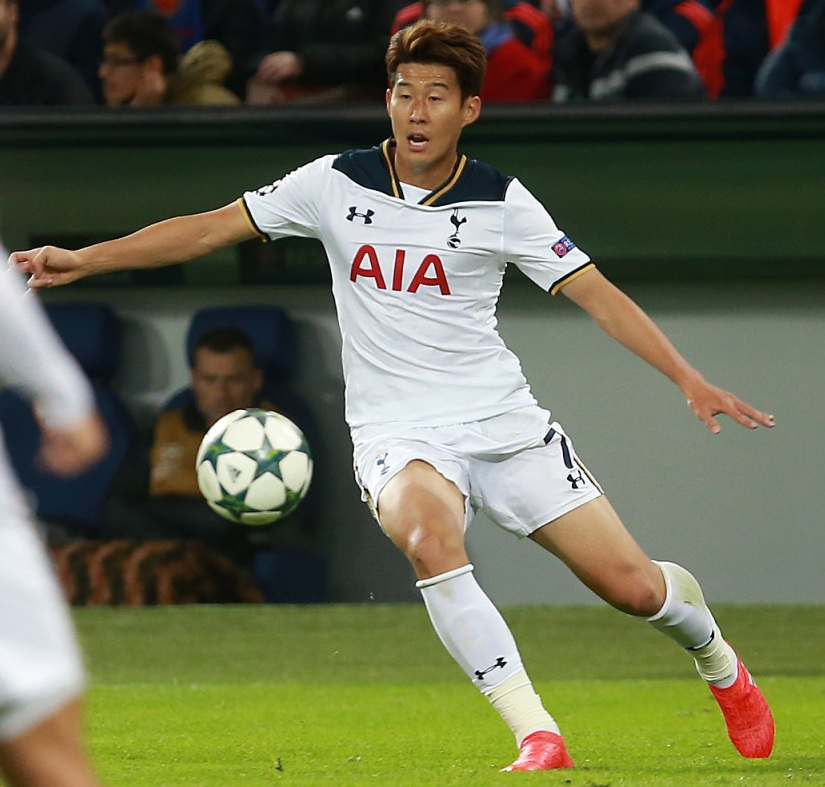
Son playing for Tottenham Hotspur in 2016

Before the season, he reportedly asked Spurs manager Mauricio Pochettino for permission to leave Tottenham in an attempt to get more playing time, but was instead given a chance to fight for his place at Spurs. On 10 September 2016, Son scored two goals and created a third in his first appearance of the season, in a 4–0 win against Stoke City. Son followed that performance up with a second brace, coming at Middlesbrough on 24 September, earning his team a 1–2 victory. Upon equalling his league goal total from the previous season in 25 fewer matches, Son was hailed by Pochettino as "a different person – he's more mature and he knows the league and he's settled in fantastically now." Son continued his excellent run of form with his fifth goal in five matches on 27 September in the Champions League. Playing at CSKA Moscow, Son slipped a shot past goalkeeper Igor Akinfeev for the only goal of the match. On 14 October, Son was named the Premier League Player of the Month for September, being the first South Korean and first Asian to receive the award.

Following the Christmas break Son continued to score the odd goal over the following couple of months and then on 12 March 2017 he scored his first Spurs hat trick in the FA Cup against Millwall in a 6–0 win. In the same match, he was racially abused by a section of the Millwall fans who chanted "DVD" and "he's selling three for a fiver" whenever he touched the ball, referencing a stereotype towards east Asians. He scored in the 2–0 victory away at Burnley on 1 April 2017, and four days later he scored in the 91st minute to put Spurs ahead at Swansea, in a game where they were losing 1–0 after 88 minutes and ended up winning 3–1. A brace at home to Watford the following weekend brought his season total to 18 goals, 11 in the Premier League, his best ever goals return. On 12 May 2017, Tottenham announced that Son had won the Premier League Player of the Month for April, the second time of his career and thus becoming the only player in 2016–17 to win the award 2 times. On 18 May 2017, Son bagged a brace away to Leicester City as part of a 6–1 rout of their former title rivals. With 21 goals in all competitions, Son joined Harry Kane and Dele Alli as the first trio of Spurs players with over 20 goals on the season.

==== 2017–18: Top-10 goalscorer ====
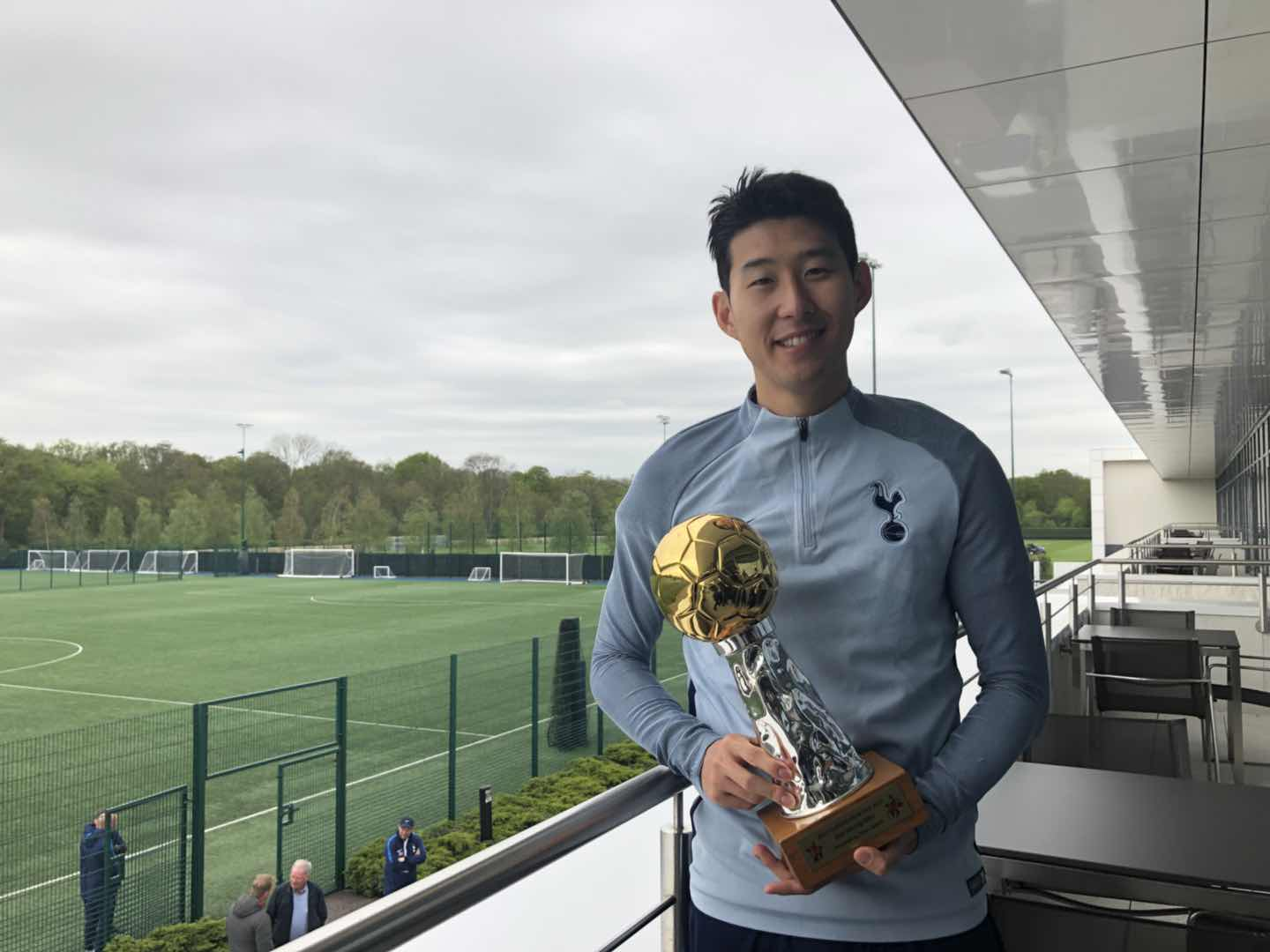
Son with the Best Footballer in Asia (2017) award in 2018

Son scored his first goal of the 2017–18 season in the UEFA Champions League game against Borussia Dortmund on 13 September 2017 at Spurs temporary home Wembley Stadium, which Spurs won 3–1. He scored his first Premier League goal in the season when Spurs beat Liverpool 4–1 at home. On 5 November 2017, Son scored the only goal in the 1–0 win against Crystal Palace. The goal brought his tally in the Premier League to 20 and in doing so he became the top Asian goalscorer in Premier League history, breaking the record set by Park Ji-Sung at Manchester United. On 13 January 2018, Son scored a goal and provided an assist in a game against Everton, matching the club record set in 2004 by Jermain Defoe of scoring in five consecutive home games. On 28 February 2018, Son scored a brace and assisted Fernando Llorente as Tottenham beat Rochdale 6–1 in the fifth round of the FA Cup. Son also converted a penalty, but his goal was overruled by the video assistant referee. Son has become the first Asian to finish the season as a top-10 goalscorer in the English Premier League.

==== 2018–19: Champions League runner-up ====
On 20 July 2018, Son signed a new five-year deal extending his contract with Tottenham until 2023. The first goals of the season came in October 2018 when he scored a brace in his 150th game for Tottenham in the 2018–19 EFL Cup match against West Ham. He scored his first league goal in the season, his 50th goal for the club in all competitions, in a solo effort in the 3–1 home win against Chelsea, inflicting the first defeat for Chelsea in the Premier League this season. This goal won the Premier League's Goal of the Month award for November. On 13 February 2019, Son scored the first goal in a 3–0 win over Borussia Dortmund, in the first leg of the round of 16, UEFA Champions League. At the end of the month he was named Premier League Player of the Year at the London Football Awards. On 3 April 2019, Son scored the first professional goal at the new Tottenham Hotspur Stadium in a 2–0 victory over Crystal Palace.

On 9 April 2019, Son scored the first European competition goal at the Tottenham Hotspur Stadium in a 1–0 win against Manchester City in the quarterfinals of the 2018–19 Champions League. In the return leg, Son scored twice to earn Tottenham a 4–4 aggregate win on the away goals rule and help the club reach the semi-finals of the competition for the first time since 1962, and only the second time ever. His brace also saw him become the highest scoring Asian player in the history of the tournament with 12 goals, overtaking the previous record holder, Maxim Shatskikh. On 4 May 2019, Son received his first red card in the Premier League due to his vindictive action against Jefferson Lerma.

==== 2019–20: Puskás Award ====
Son opened his 2019–20 account on 14 September 2019 by scoring two goals against Crystal Palace in the Premier League with a final result of 4–0. On 21 October, Son was named in the 30-man shortlist for the 2019 Ballon d'Or. On 3 November, Son was sent off during a 1–1 draw with Everton after sliding into André Gomes from behind, causing him to fall awkwardly and break his ankle. The injury prompted great concern and anguish from the players and supporters; Son was visibly highly distressed by the incident. Following the red card for the challenge on Gomes, Son also received suspension for three Premier League games. However, many professionals including former Everton player Kevin Kilbane expressed criticism of the red card decision, and Tottenham made an appeal to the Football Association against the dismissal. The FA accepted the appeal and Son's red card was rescinded on 5 November. Three days after this incident, in a 4–0 Champions League away game to Red Star Belgrade, in which Son scored a brace, rather than celebrating his first goal, he apologised to the camera for what happened at Goodison Park.

On 23 November 2019, Son scored Tottenham's first goal with José Mourinho as manager, earning him Man-of-the-match in a 3–2 Spurs victory against West Ham. On 7 December, in the match against Burnley, Son ran from one end of the pitch to the other, going past seven Burnley players, to score an individual goal that was immediately labelled a goal of the season contender. The nature of the goal saw Mourinho dub him "Sonaldo Nazario" in reference to the type of goal former Brazilian international Ronaldo would score. In January 2020, Son was awarded the Premier League goal of the month for December for his goal against Burnley, eventually winning him the Goal of the Season award. The goal was further recognised by FIFA with a Puskás Award as the best goal of the past 12 months in December 2020.

On 22 December 2019, facing Chelsea, Son was sent off after raising his boot against Antonio Rüdiger's ribs. On 16 February 2020, Son scored two goals at Villa Park and earned a 3–2 victory for Tottenham, in which he became the first Asian footballer to score 50 goals in the Premier League, with 51 scored goals in 151 Premier League matches. Son played the full game despite suffering a fracture to his arm at the 31st second of the game. Head coach José Mourinho declared at a later stage that he was not optimistic regarding Son's injury and that it was likely that the South Korean would be sidelined for the rest of the season.

On 6 April 2020, while football was suspended due to the COVID-19 pandemic in Europe, it was confirmed that Son would carry out his mandatory military service for South Korea. After completing a two-week quarantine on his return to Korea, he served with the Marine Corps for three weeks on Jeju Island.

==== 2020–21: PFA Team of the Year ====
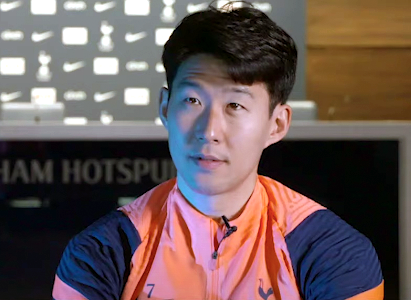
Son with Tottenham Hotspur in 2021

In the second Premier League match of the 2020–21 season, Son scored four goals, all assisted by Harry Kane, in a 5–2 win against Southampton and the first League win and away win of the season. This was the first time in Premier League history in which a single player scored four goals in a match while being assisted by the same teammate. In the Premier League game on 4 October, he scored a brace against Manchester United to help Tottenham win 6–1, which is the biggest win for Tottenham at Old Trafford and their best result against United since a home win in 1932. Based on his performances, Son received his third Premier League Player of the Month award on 13 November 2020.

On 28 January 2021, Son's counterpart on the Korean Women's National Team, Cho So-hyun joined FA WSL side Tottenham Hotspur on loan for the remainder of the 2020–21 season. With Son already at the club it gave Spurs the rare distinction of having both the Men's and Women's Korean National Team Captains at one club.

On 2 January 2021, Son scored his 100th goal for Tottenham in the 3–0 win against Leeds. On 10 February 2021, he provided three assists, but Tottenham lost 5–4 to Everton in the FA Cup. On 7 March, Son provided an assist to Harry Kane in a 4–1 win against Crystal Palace, and this, their 14th combined goal effort whereby one assisted another, set a record for the most goal combinations in a single Premier League season. After the end of the season, he and Kane were selected for the PFA Premier League Team of the Year, although Tottenham finished in seventh place.

==== 2021–22: Premier League Golden Boot ====
On 23 July 2021, Son extended his contract with Tottenham until 2025. On 15 August, he scored his first goal of the season in the opening match against Manchester City, which ended in a 1–0 win. On 4 November, he scored in new manager Antonio Conte's first match in charge, a 3–2 victory over Vitesse in the group stage of the Europa Conference League. In doing so, Son had the distinction of scoring the first goal under each of Tottenham's last three permanent managers. On 26 February, Son scored a goal against Leeds United in a 4–0 win; the goal was assisted by Harry Kane meaning this was the 37th time Kane and Son had combined to score, which set a new record in goal-scoring partnerships in the Premier League.

On 9 April, Son scored a hat-trick against Aston Villa to give Spurs a 4–0 away win at Villa Park, and also break into Tottenham Hotspur all-time top 10 goalscoring list. Son scored twice in a 5–0 win against Norwich City on the last day of the season securing a Champions League qualification for Tottenham, after finishing in fourth place in the Premier League, while also winning the Premier League Golden Boot alongside Mohamed Salah with 23 goals, becoming the first Asian player to do so.

==== 2022–23: 100th Premier League goal ====
After winning the Golden Boot the previous season, Son had a poor start to the 2022–23 season, failing to score any goal in the first eight games and proving only one assist. He ended his goal drought in the game against Leicester City on 17 September, when he came off the bench to score a hat-trick in 13 minutes to help Tottenham win 6–2. On 1 November, Son collided with Marseille's Chancel Mbemba during the final matchday of the UEFA Champions League group stage, which caused an orbital fracture in his left eye. Son managed to recover enough to play in the 2022 World Cup for South Korea, wearing a protective mask in all his matches.

On 19 February 2023, after scoring a 72nd-minute goal against West Ham to secure a 2–0 victory, Son was subjected to online racist abuse, which was condemned as "utterly reprehensible" by Tottenham and the Kick It Out anti-racism organisation. Despite enduring a difficult season for Tottenham, on 8 April, Son scored his 100th Premier League goal in a 2–1 win over Brighton & Hove Albion, and became the first Asian player to reach that landmark.

The day after Tottenham's last league game of the season against Leeds United, on 29 May, Son underwent an operation to treat a hernia issue. In an interview with TV Chosun, Son revealed that he carried the injury with him for 8–9 months, which allowed him to play only at 60% of his normal ability for much of the season.

==== 2023–2025: Captaincy and Europa League victory ====
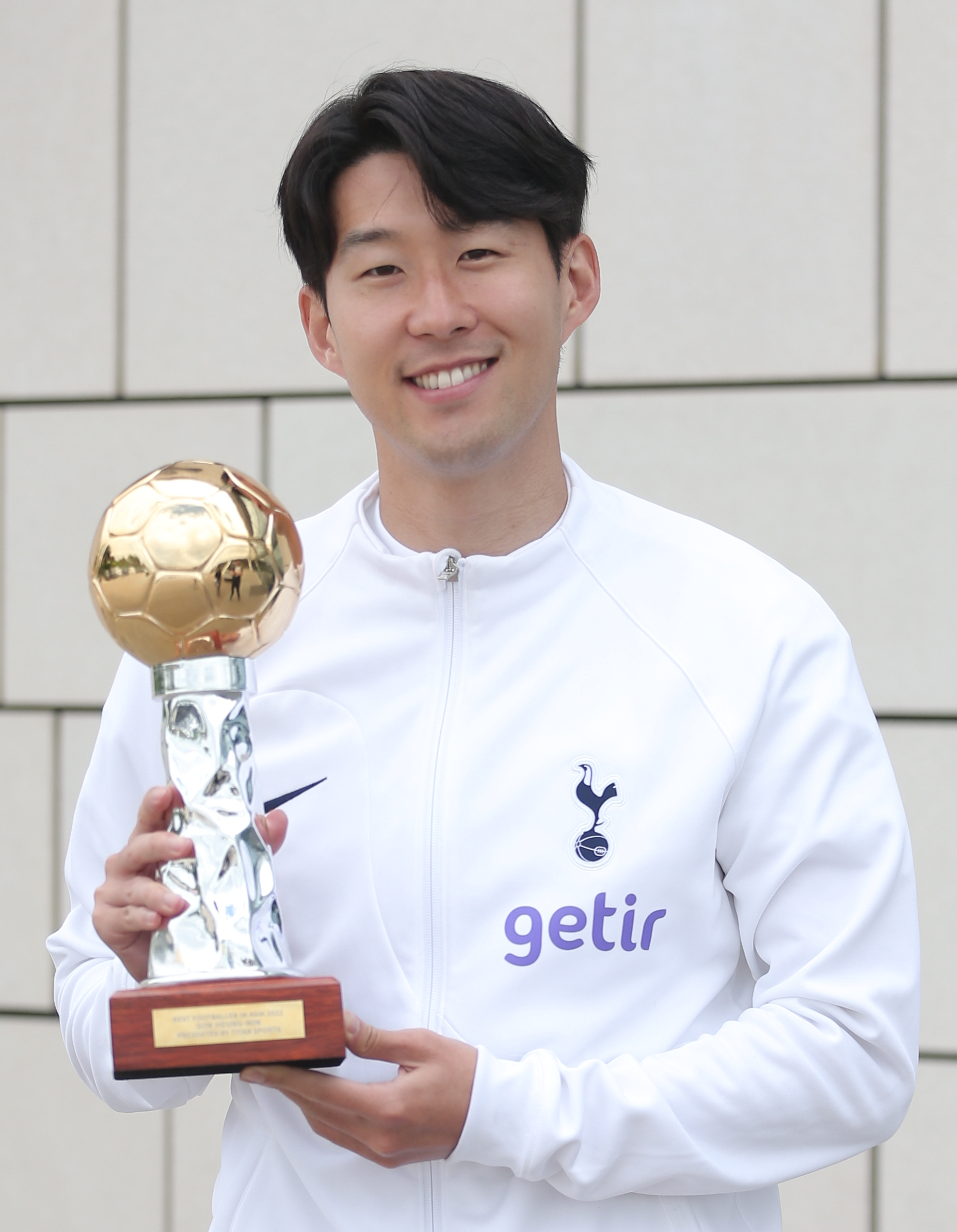
Son with the Best Footballer in Asia (2022) award in 2023

On 12 August 2023, it was announced that Son had been made Tottenham's new captain, replacing Hugo Lloris. On 2 September, he scored his first hat-trick as club's captain in a 5–2 away win over Burnley. On 24 September, he scored two equalisers as Spurs drew 2–2 away against Arsenal in the North London derby, becoming the sixth player in the club's history to score 150 goals, after netting his 149th and 150th goals in the derby. Following the match, Son earned the praise of his manager Ange Postecoglou, stating that "he's been outstanding as a leader and as a player [...] we have put him in that nine position now and he just works so hard. He is so team-first orientated, it is incredible". He scored the opening goal against Liverpool on 1 October in a 2–1 victory at home, in Spurs' first victory against them in five years. This was his 200th professional goal in all competitions across top-division European football. For his six goals in four games in September, he was later named Premier League Player of the Month, his fourth time receiving the award. He had a goal and two assists in a 4–1 victory over Newcastle United on 10 December, becoming Tottenham's all-time assist leader in the Premier League with 83 assists.

On 10 February 2024, Son made his return from the 2023 AFC Asian Cup, assisting teammate Brennan Johnson to score a 90+6th-minute goal, a late minute winner in a 2–1 win over Brighton & Hove Albion. This prompted Postecoglou to hail him as "the best attacking player in the competition". On 19 December, Son scored directly from a corner in a 4–3 win over Manchester United in the EFL Cup quarter-finals.

On 7 January 2025, Tottenham announced they had exercised their option to extend Son's contract by an additional 12 months until June 2026. On 21 May, Son lifted the UEFA Europa League trophy after playing as a substitute at the 2025 UEFA Europa League final which ended in a 1–0 win over Manchester United. The Europa League title was Tottenham's first title since the 2007–08 Football League Cup and Son's first title in his professional career. On 1 August, in a pre-season press conference in Seoul, Son announced that he was set to depart Tottenham before the beginning of the season. Son's final appearance for the club came the following day in a friendly against Newcastle United in the Seoul World Cup Stadium; when Son was substituted off in the 67th minute, players from both sides formed an impromptu guard of honour.

=== Los Angeles FC ===
Son Heung-min with Los Angeles FC in 2026

On 6 August 2025, Son moved to Major League Soccer club Los Angeles FC in a deal worth $26.5 million, an MLS record, departing Tottenham Hotspur after 10 years. His signing made Son become just the second South Korean player in the club's history, the other being Kim Moon-hwan. On 23 August, Son scored his first goal for LAFC by converting a free kick in a 1–1 draw with FC Dallas. On 17 September, Son scored his first hat-trick for LAFC to help lead the team to a 4–1 away win at Real Salt Lake. On 27 October, Son's first goal for LAFC, which he scored against FC Dallas, was voted the MLS Goal of the Year.

Among all MLS players during the 2026 season, Son provided the sixth most assists with 15 assists including 3 secondary assists, but scored the lowest goals in comparison to expected goals (7 goals out of 12.38 expected goals).

== International career ==
=== 2009–2014: Youth level and first major tournaments ===
Son was a member of the South Korea national team that participated at the 2009 FIFA U-17 World Cup held in Nigeria.

On 24 December 2010, Son was named in South Korea national team's squad for the 2011 AFC Asian Cup, making his debut for the national team in a pre-tournament friendly against Syria on 30 December. At the tournament finals, Son scored his first international goal during a 4–1 group stage win against India.

On 7 October 2011, after initially missing the first two matches of South Korea's 2014 FIFA World Cup qualification campaign on 2 and 6 September 2011 due to an ankle injury, Son played in a friendly against Poland, and was again featured in 11 October World Cup qualifier against the United Arab Emirates. His selection for national team play was a point of concern for Son's father, however, who caused a stir by asking the Korea Football Association not to select his son for the national team in the immediate future so he can rest and mature more as a player. Cho Kwang-rae, then the South Korea head coach, responded by saying that he would continue to call up Son when needed.

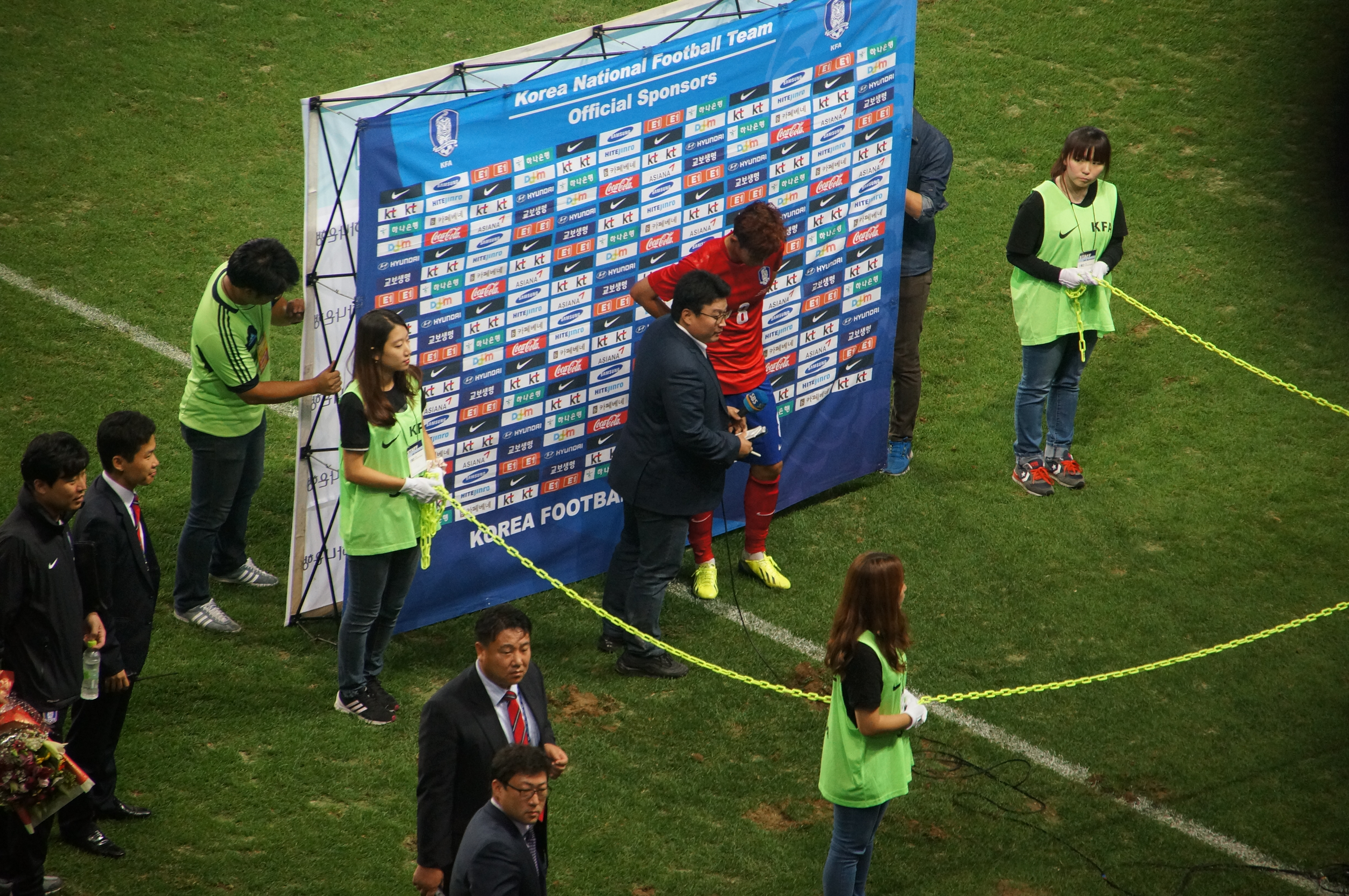
Son being interviewed after playing for South Korea in 2013

Son turned down the opportunity to participate in the 2012 London Olympics, opting to concentrate on his club career at Hamburger SV. Son was quoted as saying, "In Korea, an Olympic appearance has a special meaning, but I want to speed up for Hamburg. What matters is to pour all my time into team training." Son did, however, play for the national team in the autumn of 2012 for two 2014 FIFA World Cup qualifiers against Lebanon and Iran, and became a regular call-up in friendlies and World Cup qualifying matches in 2013. In the World Cup qualifier against Qatar on 23 March 2013, Son came on as a substitute in the 81st minute and scored the winning goal in the 96th minute.

In June 2014, Son was named in South Korea's squad for the 2014 World Cup. On 22 June, he scored in a 4–2 defeat to Algeria in the team's second group match. The Korea Football Association requested Bayer Leverkusen to allow Son to play in the 2014 Asian Games, as winning the gold medal at the tournament would grant Son exemption from military service. Despite Son affirming his interest and the KFA's efforts, Bayer Leverkusen refused to release him, as his absence would mean the team would lose him for at least six matches.

=== 2015–2018: Asian Cup runner-up and Asian Games gold ===
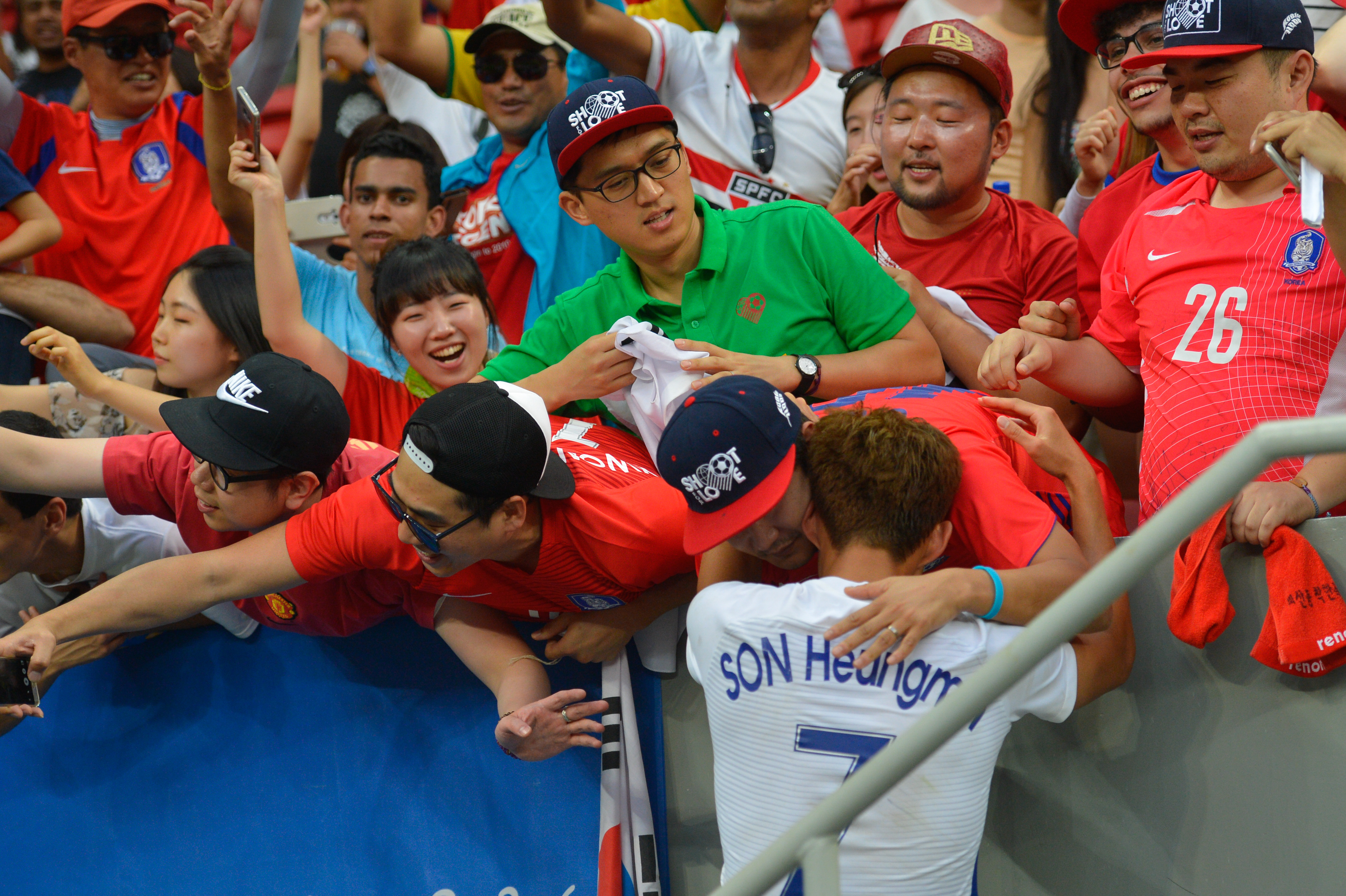
Son with South Korean fans at the 2016 Summer Olympics

Son was selected for South Korea for the 2015 AFC Asian Cup in Australia. At the quarter-final stage, he scored both of the team's goals in the 2–0 extra time defeat of Uzbekistan. In the final against the hosts, managed by future manager Ange Postecoglou, he levelled the scoring in added time, but his team lost 2–1 after extra time. He was chosen as one of three forwards in the competition's Team of the Tournament.

In June 2016, Son was named as one of the three overage players in South Korea under-23 squad for the 2016 Summer Olympics. Son amassed two goals in the group stages with one against Fiji and another against Germany, helping his team top the group with two wins and a draw. However, South Korea was later eliminated by Honduras in the Quarterfinals, with Son missing crucial chances.

On 3 September 2015 at the Hwaseong Stadium, Son scored a hat-trick in an 8–0 home win over Laos in the second round of qualification for the 2018 World Cup.

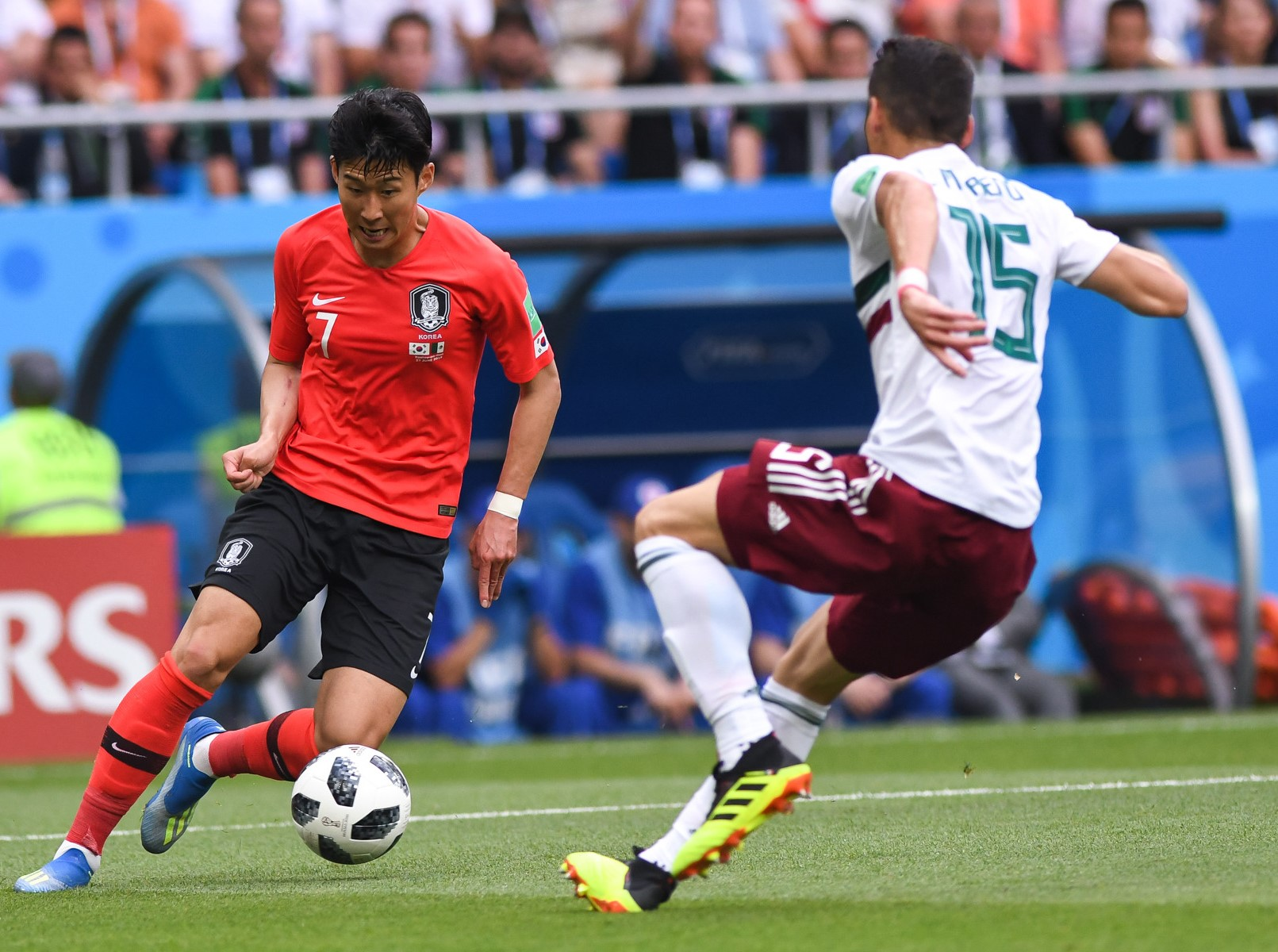
Son playing for South Korea against Mexico at the 2018 FIFA World Cup

On 13 June 2017, Son broke his right forearm after falling awkwardly on his arm during a World Cup qualifier match in Doha against Qatar. He was part of the team that saw Korea qualify for the 2018 World Cup after a 0–0 draw against Uzbekistan on 5 September 2017. On 4 June 2018, Son was selected in the 23-man squad for the World Cup. On 23 June, Son scored a goal from outside the box – a curling strike into the top corner – though his side was defeated with a 2–1 loss to Mexico in their second group stage match of the World Cup, eliminating Korea. On 27 June, during their final group stage match, he scored the second goal in the 97th minute in their 2–0 victory over reigning world champions Germany, sealing their elimination.

Son was selected as one of three overage players permitted in the under-23 team for the football tournament at the 2018 Asian Games in Indonesia. He captained the team in the final game of the group stage against Kyrgyzstan, scoring the only goal of the match to help the team reach the knockout rounds. He also captained the team in the knockout rounds and reached the final after the Taeguk Warriors beat Vietnam, 3–1. In the gold medal match, Son assisted in both extra-time goals in a 2–1 victory over Japan, which guaranteed the entire squad's exemption from his country's mandatory military service.

=== 2019–present: Assuming the captaincy ===
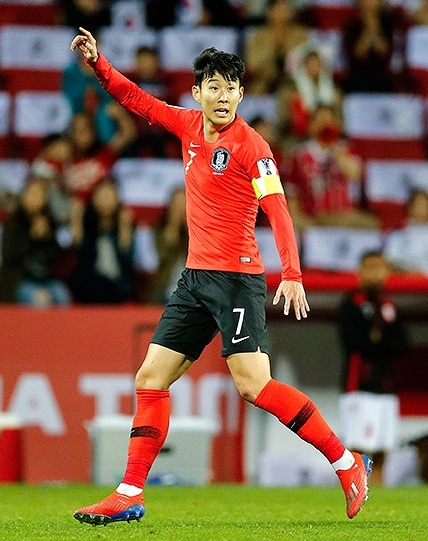
Son playing for South Korea at the 2019 AFC Asian Cup

Son was called up as captain for the 2019 AFC Asian Cup in the United Arab Emirates by Paulo Bento, but missed the first two group matches due to an agreement with Tottenham Hotspur related to his call-up. His play at the tournament was generally lethargic without a goal. He contributed to South Korea's both goals by providing an assist and winning a penalty in a 2–0 win over China. In contrast with the good start, he made one successful dribble (out of seven attempts) and one shot on target in the knockout rounds against Bahrain and Qatar. He returned to London after a 1–0 defeat to eventual champion Qatar in the quarter-finals.

Despite still recovering from an eye injury, in October 2022, Son was named to lead the 26-man South Korean squad for the 2022 FIFA World Cup. Due to the tenderness of his injury, Son wore a mask that covered nearly half his face. Son failed to score a goal for his nation's group stage matches, but successfully led South Korea to the round of 16, for the first time since 2010, following a match winning assist to Hwang Hee-chan in a shock 2–1 victory against Portugal on 2 December, before being eliminated by Brazil following a 4–1 defeat on 5 December.

Son was called up under manager Jürgen Klinsmann in the 2023 AFC Asian Cup. He won a penalty and converted it into the opening goal in the second group stage match against Jordan, which ended in a 2–2 draw. He scored South Korea's first penalty, contributing to a 4–2 penalty shoot-out win over Saudi Arabia in the round of 16. His best performance in the competition came in a 2–1 quarter-final win over Australia, where he won a crucial penalty during the second half of stoppage time and scored the winning goal with a free-kick in the first half of extra time. South Korea once again met Jordan in the semi-finals but lost 2–0. The Korea Football Association later confirmed that, on the eve of the semi-final, Son had become involved in an altercation with Lee Kang-in after Lee and several younger teammates left a team dinner early to play table tennis. Son dislocated a finger as players separated them and played against Jordan with two fingers strapped. Amid intense public criticism of Lee in South Korea, Lee later travelled to London to apologise to Son in person. Son accepted the apology, acknowledged that he was not proud of his own conduct, and asked supporters to forgive Lee.

On 9 September 2025, Son started against Mexico in an international friendly at Geodis Park in Nashville, joining Hong Myung-bo and Cha Bum-kun as the most capped player for the South Korean national team with 136 appearances.

Son played three Group A matches for South Korea at the 2026 FIFA World Cup. He attempted six shots in a 2–1 win over Czech Republic, but five of them were inaccurate, and the other one was blocked by opposing goalkeeper. Afterwards, he attempted a total of one shot while his country lost 1–0 to both Mexico and South Africa. During the team's game against South Africa, Son was benched for the first half of the game. This decision led to heavy criticism towards manager Hong Myung-bo which eventually led to Hong stepping down from the team.

In a friendly match against Uzbekistan on 6 October 2026, Son scored his 59th international goal to make him South Korea's record goalscorer, overtaking Cha Bum-kun's 58.

== Style of play ==
Son is a versatile player who can play in any forward position, (winger, second striker, striker) and can even be deployed as an attacking midfielder or wing-back if necessary. He himself has confirmed this, saying, "I don't care where I play. The main thing is I'm in the game. I can play as a second striker or behind. Whatever the coach says, I'll do. I don't have a favorite position. I'll be anywhere and always on the throttle."

Son is known for his two-footed ability, explosive pace, positional sense, movement, close control and clinical finishing which make him especially effective on the counter-attack. Moreover, he has drawn praise from teammates and in the media for his selfless work-rate and defensive contribution, and is capable of providing assists for teammates, in addition to scoring goals himself. In a 2021 interview, Sir Alex Ferguson mentioned Son as a player that he wished he could have managed, calling him and then-teammate Harry Kane "excellent players".

== Sponsorship and media ==
Son has a sponsorship deal with sportswear and equipment supplier Adidas. Since 2022, he has been a brand ambassador for British luxury fashion house Burberry. In March 2023, Son was named as the global face of the Burberry's first campaign under its new chief creative officer Daniel Lee along with Georgia May Jagger.

In February 2022, Son was selected as brand ambassador for American high-end luggage brand Tumi. In February 2024, he was upgraded to become a global ambassador for Tumi and appeared on its global campaign with the new TUMI 19 Degree Aluminum collection. On 7 August 2022, Son was named brand ambassador for Calvin Klein Underwear in South Korea.

Son has two officially licensed NFT collections that have been released in collaboration with NFTStar (a sports fandom social platform with a web3 community) that are available for purchase on OpenSea. His first NFT collection is called the 'NFTStar Fan Pass – Son Heung Min', and the second NFT collection called 'Golden Shiny Boot' was a free mint project available for fan pass holders.

Son has a Fortnite outfit.

== Personal life ==
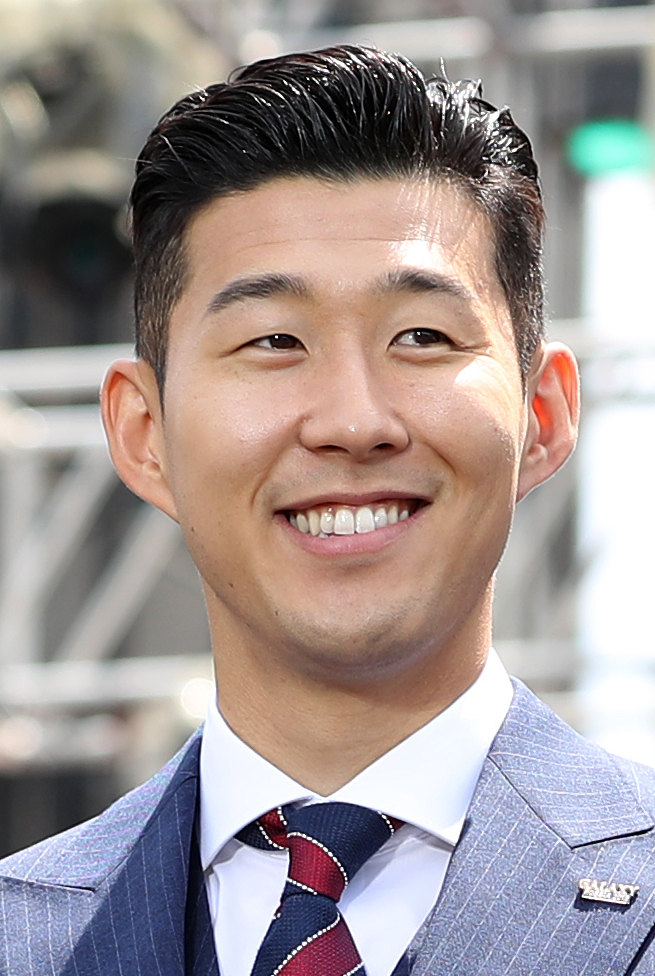
Son in 2018

In 2018, Son opened Son Football Academy in his hometown Chuncheon with his father and his brother, at a cost of £11 million, most of it funded by Son himself.

In 2019, Son donated around £100,000 to the victims of the Goseong Fire, which left vast devastation in Goseong County, Gangwon, in his native South Korea. In 2020, Son donated £65,000 in aid, to combat the COVID-19 pandemic in South Korea.

Son used the suspension of football during the COVID-19 pandemic to complete South Korean mandatory military service. He was exempted from military service with a gold medal at the Asian Games, but he had to do basic military training regardless of exemption. He completed basic training in the Republic of Korea Marine Corps in Jeju in April–May 2020, finishing in the top five of 157 trainees.

As a South Korean player, Son has suffered racist abuse from fans during games and online. He is part of UEFA's Real Scars campaign, which seeks to raise awareness of online abuse and harassment of football players.

In 2025, a woman was convicted and sentenced to four years in prison by a court in Seoul for falsely accusing Son of fathering her child and blackmailing him into providing $300 million won ($200,000) in exchange for her silence.

On 27 August 2025, Son threw the first pitch for the Major League Baseball team Los Angeles Dodgers to kick-off their game against the Cincinnati Reds.

Son is godfather to the children of his former Spurs team-mate Ben Davies.

== Career statistics ==
=== Club ===
As of match played 7 November 2026

Appearances and goals by club, season and competition
| Club | Season | League | | | National cup (Note: Includes DFB-Pokal, FA Cup) | | League cup (Note: Includes Football League/EFL Cup) | | Continental | | Other | | Total | |
| Club | Season | Division | Apps | Goals | Apps | Goals | Apps | Goals | Apps | Goals | Apps | Goals | Apps | Goals |
|---|---|---|---|---|---|---|---|---|---|---|---|---|---|---|
| Hamburger SV II | 2009–10 | Regionalliga Nord | 6 | 1 | — | | — | | — | | — | | 6 | 1 |
| Hamburger SV | 2010–11 | Bundesliga | 13 | 3 | 1 | 0 | — | | — | | — | | 14 | 3 |
| Hamburger SV | 2011–12 | Bundesliga | 27 | 5 | 3 | 0 | — | | — | | — | | 30 | 5 |
| Hamburger SV | 2012–13 | Bundesliga | 33 | 12 | 1 | 0 | — | | — | | — | | 34 | 12 |
| Hamburger SV | Total | | 73 | 20 | 5 | 0 | — | | — | | — | | 78 | 20 |
| Bayer Leverkusen | 2013–14 | Bundesliga | 31 | 10 | 4 | 2 | — | | 8 (Note: Appearance(s) in UEFA Champions League) | 0 | — | | 43 | 12 |
| Bayer Leverkusen | 2014–15 | Bundesliga | 30 | 11 | 2 | 1 | — | | 10 | 5 | — | | 42 | 17 |
| Bayer Leverkusen | 2015–16 | Bundesliga | 1 | 0 | 0 | 0 | — | | 1 | 0 | — | | 2 | 0 |
| Bayer Leverkusen | Total | | 62 | 21 | 6 | 3 | — | | 19 | 5 | — | | 87 | 29 |
| Tottenham Hotspur | 2015–16 | Premier League | 28 | 4 | 4 | 1 | 1 | 0 | 7 (Note: Appearances in UEFA Europa League) | 3 | — | | 40 | 8 |
| Tottenham Hotspur | 2016–17 | Premier League | 34 | 14 | 5 | 6 | 0 | 0 | 8 (Note: Six appearances and one goal in UEFA Champions League, two appearances in UEFA Europa League) | 1 | — | | 47 | 21 |
| Tottenham Hotspur | 2017–18 | Premier League | 37 | 12 | 7 | 2 | 2 | 0 | 7 | 4 | — | | 53 | 18 |
| Tottenham Hotspur | 2018–19 | Premier League | 31 | 12 | 1 | 1 | 4 | 3 | 12 | 4 | — | | 48 | 20 |
| Tottenham Hotspur | 2019–20 | Premier League | 30 | 11 | 4 | 2 | 1 | 0 | 6 | 5 | — | | 41 | 18 |
| Tottenham Hotspur | 2020–21 | Premier League | 37 | 17 | 2 | 0 | 3 | 1 | 9 | 4 | — | | 51 | 22 |
| Tottenham Hotspur | 2021–22 | Premier League | 35 | 23 | 2 | 0 | 4 | 0 | 4 (Note: Appearances in UEFA Conference League) | 1 | — | | 45 | 24 |
| Tottenham Hotspur | 2022–23 | Premier League | 36 | 10 | 3 | 2 | 0 | 0 | 8 | 2 | — | | 47 | 14 |
| Tottenham Hotspur | 2023–24 | Premier League | 35 | 17 | 0 | 0 | 1 | 0 | — | | — | | 36 | 17 |
| Tottenham Hotspur | 2024–25 | Premier League | 30 | 7 | 2 | 0 | 4 | 1 | 10 | 3 | — | | 46 | 11 |
| Tottenham Hotspur | Total | | 333 | 127 | 30 | 14 | 21 | 5 | 70 | 27 | — | | 454 | 173 |
| Los Angeles FC | 2025 | Major League Soccer | 10 | 9 | — | | — | | — | | 3 (Note: Appearances in MLS Cup playoffs) | 3 | 13 | 12 |
| Los Angeles FC | 2026 | Major League Soccer | 31 | 7 | — | | — | | 8 (Note: Appearances in CONCACAF Champions Cup) | 2 | 3 (Note: Appearances in Leagues Cup) | 0 | 42 | 9 |
| Los Angeles FC | Total | | 41 | 16 | — | | — | | 8 | 2 | 6 | 3 | 55 | 21 |
| Career total | | | 515 | 185 | 41 | 17 | 21 | 5 | 97 | 34 | 6 | 3 | 680 | 244 |

=== International ===
As of match played 17 November 2026

Appearances and goals by national team and year
| National team | Year | Apps | Goals |
|---|---|---|---|
| South Korea | 2010 | 1 | 0 |
| South Korea | 2011 | 7 | 1 |
| South Korea | 2012 | 3 | 0 |
| South Korea | 2013 | 11 | 4 |
| South Korea | 2014 | 12 | 2 |
| South Korea | 2015 | 12 | 9 |
| South Korea | 2016 | 6 | 1 |
| South Korea | 2017 | 9 | 3 |
| South Korea | 2018 | 13 | 3 |
| South Korea | 2019 | 13 | 3 |
| South Korea | 2020 | 2 | 0 |
| South Korea | 2021 | 7 | 4 |
| South Korea | 2022 | 12 | 5 |
| South Korea | 2023 | 8 | 6 |
| South Korea | 2024 | 15 | 10 |
| South Korea | 2025 | 9 | 3 |
| South Korea | 2026 | 13 | 5 |
| Total | | 153 | 59 |

As of match played 6 October 2026
Scores and results list South Korea's goal tally first, score column indicates score after each Son goal.

List of international goals scored by Son Heung-min
| No. | Date | Venue | Cap | Opponent | Score | Result | Competition | Ref. |
|---|---|---|---|---|---|---|---|---|
| 1 | 18 January 2011 | Thani bin Jassim Stadium, Al Rayyan, Qatar | 3 | India | 4–1 | 4–1 | 2011 AFC Asian Cup | |
| 2 | 26 March 2013 | Seoul World Cup Stadium, Seoul, South Korea | 13 | Qatar | 2–1 | 2–1 | 2014 FIFA World Cup qualification | |
| 3 | 6 September 2013 | Incheon Football Stadium, Incheon, South Korea | 17 | Haiti | 1–0 | 4–1 | Friendly | |
| 4 | 6 September 2013 | Incheon Football Stadium, Incheon, South Korea | 17 | Haiti | 4–1 | 4–1 | Friendly | |
| 5 | 15 October 2013 | Cheonan Stadium, Cheonan, South Korea | 20 | Mali | 2–1 | 3–1 | Friendly | |
| 6 | 5 March 2014 | Karaiskakis Stadium, Piraeus, Greece | 23 | Greece | 2–0 | 2–0 | Friendly | |
| 7 | 22 June 2014 | Estádio Beira-Rio, Porto Alegre, Brazil | 27 | Algeria | 1–3 | 2–4 | 2014 FIFA World Cup | |
| 8 | 22 January 2015 | Melbourne Rectangular Stadium, Melbourne, Australia | 37 | Uzbekistan | 1–0 | 2–0 (a.e.t.) | 2015 AFC Asian Cup | |
| 9 | 22 January 2015 | Melbourne Rectangular Stadium, Melbourne, Australia | 37 | Uzbekistan | 2–0 | 2–0 (a.e.t.) | 2015 AFC Asian Cup | |
| 10 | 31 January 2015 | ANZ Stadium, Sydney, Australia | 39 | Australia | 1–1 | 1–2 (a.e.t.) | 2015 AFC Asian Cup | |
| 11 | 16 June 2015 | Rajamangala Stadium, Bangkok, Thailand | 43 | Myanmar | 2–0 | 2–0 | 2018 FIFA World Cup qualification | |
| 12 | 3 September 2015 | Hwaseong Stadium, Hwaseong, South Korea | 44 | Laos | 2–0 | 8–0 | 2018 FIFA World Cup qualification | |
| 13 | 3 September 2015 | Hwaseong Stadium, Hwaseong, South Korea | 44 | Laos | 5–0 | 8–0 | 2018 FIFA World Cup qualification | |
| 14 | 3 September 2015 | Hwaseong Stadium, Hwaseong, South Korea | 44 | Laos | 7–0 | 8–0 | 2018 FIFA World Cup qualification | |
| 15 | 17 November 2015 | New Laos National Stadium, Vientiane, Laos | 46 | Laos | 3–0 | 5–0 | 2018 FIFA World Cup qualification | |
| 16 | 17 November 2015 | New Laos National Stadium, Vientiane, Laos | 46 | Laos | 5–0 | 5–0 | 2018 FIFA World Cup qualification | |
| 17 | 6 October 2016 | Suwon World Cup Stadium, Suwon, South Korea | 50 | Qatar | 3–2 | 3–2 | 2018 FIFA World Cup qualification | |
| 18 | 10 October 2017 | Tissot Arena, Biel/Bienne, Switzerland | 59 | Morocco | 1–3 | 1–3 | Friendly | |
| 19 | 10 November 2017 | Suwon World Cup Stadium, Suwon, South Korea | 60 | Colombia | 1–0 | 2–1 | Friendly | |
| 20 | 10 November 2017 | Suwon World Cup Stadium, Suwon, South Korea | 60 | Colombia | 2–0 | 2–1 | Friendly | |
| 21 | 28 May 2018 | Daegu Stadium, Daegu, South Korea | 64 | Honduras | 1–0 | 2–0 | Friendly | |
| 22 | 23 June 2018 | Rostov Arena, Rostov-on-Don, Russia | 69 | Mexico | 1–2 | 1–2 | 2018 FIFA World Cup | |
| 23 | 27 June 2018 | Kazan Arena, Kazan, Russia | 70 | Germany | 2–0 | 2–0 | 2018 FIFA World Cup | |
| 24 | 26 March 2019 | Seoul World Cup Stadium, Seoul, South Korea | 79 | Colombia | 1–0 | 2–1 | Friendly | |
| 25 | 10 October 2019 | Hwaseong Stadium, Hwaseong, South Korea | 84 | Sri Lanka | 1–0 | 8–0 | 2022 FIFA World Cup qualification | |
| 26 | 10 October 2019 | Hwaseong Stadium, Hwaseong, South Korea | 84 | Sri Lanka | 5–0 | 8–0 | 2022 FIFA World Cup qualification | |
| 27 | 13 June 2021 | Goyang Stadium, Goyang, South Korea | 91 | Lebanon | 2–1 | 2–1 | 2022 FIFA World Cup qualification | |
| 28 | 7 October 2021 | Ansan Wa~ Stadium, Ansan, South Korea | 93 | Syria | 2–1 | 2–1 | 2022 FIFA World Cup qualification | |
| 29 | 12 October 2021 | Azadi Stadium, Tehran, Iran | 94 | Iran | 1–0 | 1–1 | 2022 FIFA World Cup qualification | |
| 30 | 16 November 2021 | Thani bin Jassim Stadium, Al Rayyan, Qatar | 96 | Iraq | 2–0 | 3–0 | 2022 FIFA World Cup qualification | |
| 31 | 24 March 2022 | Seoul World Cup Stadium, Seoul, South Korea | 97 | Iran | 1–0 | 2–0 | 2022 FIFA World Cup qualification | |
| 32 | 6 June 2022 | Daejeon World Cup Stadium, Daejeon, South Korea | 100 | Chile | 2–0 | 2–0 | Friendly | |
| 33 | 10 June 2022 | Suwon World Cup Stadium, Suwon, South Korea | 101 | Paraguay | 2–1 | 2–2 | Friendly | |
| 34 | 23 September 2022 | Goyang Stadium, Goyang, South Korea | 103 | Costa Rica | 2–2 | 2–2 | Friendly | |
| 35 | 27 September 2022 | Seoul World Cup Stadium, Seoul, South Korea | 104 | Cameroon | 1–0 | 1–0 | Friendly | |
| 36 | 24 March 2023 | Ulsan Munsu Football Stadium, Ulsan, South Korea | 109 | Colombia | 1–0 | 2–2 | Friendly | |
| 37 | 24 March 2023 | Ulsan Munsu Football Stadium, Ulsan, South Korea | 109 | Colombia | 2–0 | 2–2 | Friendly | |
| 38 | 17 October 2023 | Suwon World Cup Stadium, Suwon, South Korea | 114 | Vietnam | 4–0 | 6–0 | Friendly | |
| 39 | 16 November 2023 | Seoul World Cup Stadium, Seoul, South Korea | 115 | Singapore | 3–0 | 5–0 | 2026 FIFA World Cup qualification | |
| 40 | 21 November 2023 | Shenzhen Universiade Sports Centre, Shenzhen China | 116 | China | 1–0 | 3–0 | 2026 FIFA World Cup qualification | |
| 41 | 21 November 2023 | Shenzhen Universiade Sports Centre, Shenzhen China | 116 | China | 2–0 | 3–0 | 2026 FIFA World Cup qualification | |
| 42 | 20 January 2024 | Al Thumama Stadium, Doha, Qatar | 119 | Jordan | 1–0 | 2–2 | 2023 AFC Asian Cup | |
| 43 | 25 January 2024 | Al Janoub Stadium, Al Wakrah, Qatar | 120 | Malaysia | 3–2 | 3–3 | 2023 AFC Asian Cup | |
| 44 | 2 February 2024 | Al Janoub Stadium, Al Wakrah, Qatar | 122 | Australia | 2–1 | 2–1 (a.e.t.) | 2023 AFC Asian Cup | |
| 45 | 21 March 2024 | Seoul World Cup Stadium, Seoul, South Korea | 124 | Thailand | 1–0 | 1–1 | 2026 FIFA World Cup qualification | |
| 46 | 26 March 2024 | Rajamangala Stadium, Bangkok, Thailand | 125 | Thailand | 2–0 | 3–0 | 2026 FIFA World Cup qualification | |
| 47 | 6 June 2024 | National Stadium, Kallang, Singapore | 126 | Singapore | 3–0 | 7–0 | 2026 FIFA World Cup qualification | |
| 48 | 6 June 2024 | National Stadium, Kallang, Singapore | 126 | Singapore | 5–0 | 7–0 | 2026 FIFA World Cup qualification | |
| 49 | 10 September 2024 | Sultan Qaboos Sports Complex, Muscat, Oman | 129 | Oman | 2–1 | 3–1 | 2026 FIFA World Cup qualification | |
| 50 | 14 November 2024 | Jaber Al-Ahmad International Stadium, Kuwait City, Kuwait | 130 | Kuwait | 2–0 | 3–1 | 2026 FIFA World Cup qualification | |
| 51 | 19 November 2024 | Amman International Stadium, Amman, Jordan | 131 | Palestine | 1–1 | 1–1 | 2026 FIFA World Cup qualification | |
| 52 | 6 September 2025 | Sports Illustrated Stadium, Harrison, United States | 135 | United States | 1–0 | 2–0 | Friendly | |
| 53 | 9 September 2025 | Geodis Park, Nashville, United States | 136 | Mexico | 1–1 | 2–2 | Friendly | |
| 54 | 14 November 2025 | Daejeon World Cup Stadium, Daejeon, South Korea | 139 | Bolivia | 1–0 | 2–0 | Friendly | |
| 55 | 30 May 2026 | South Field, Provo, United States | 143 | Trinidad and Tobago | 1–0 | 5–0 | Friendly | |
| 56 | 30 May 2026 | South Field, Provo, United States | 143 | Trinidad and Tobago | 2–0 | 5–0 | Friendly | |
| 57 | 24 September 2026 | Suwon World Cup Stadium, Suwon, South Korea | 148 | Ecuador | 2–0 | 3–0 | Friendly | |
| 58 | 28 September 2026 | Seoul World Cup Stadium, Seoul, South Korea | 149 | Uruguay | 1–4 | 1–4 | Friendly | |
| 59 | 6 October 2026 | Yongin Mireu Stadium, Yongin, South Korea | 151 | Uzbekistan | 1–0 | 2–0 | Friendly | |

== Honours ==
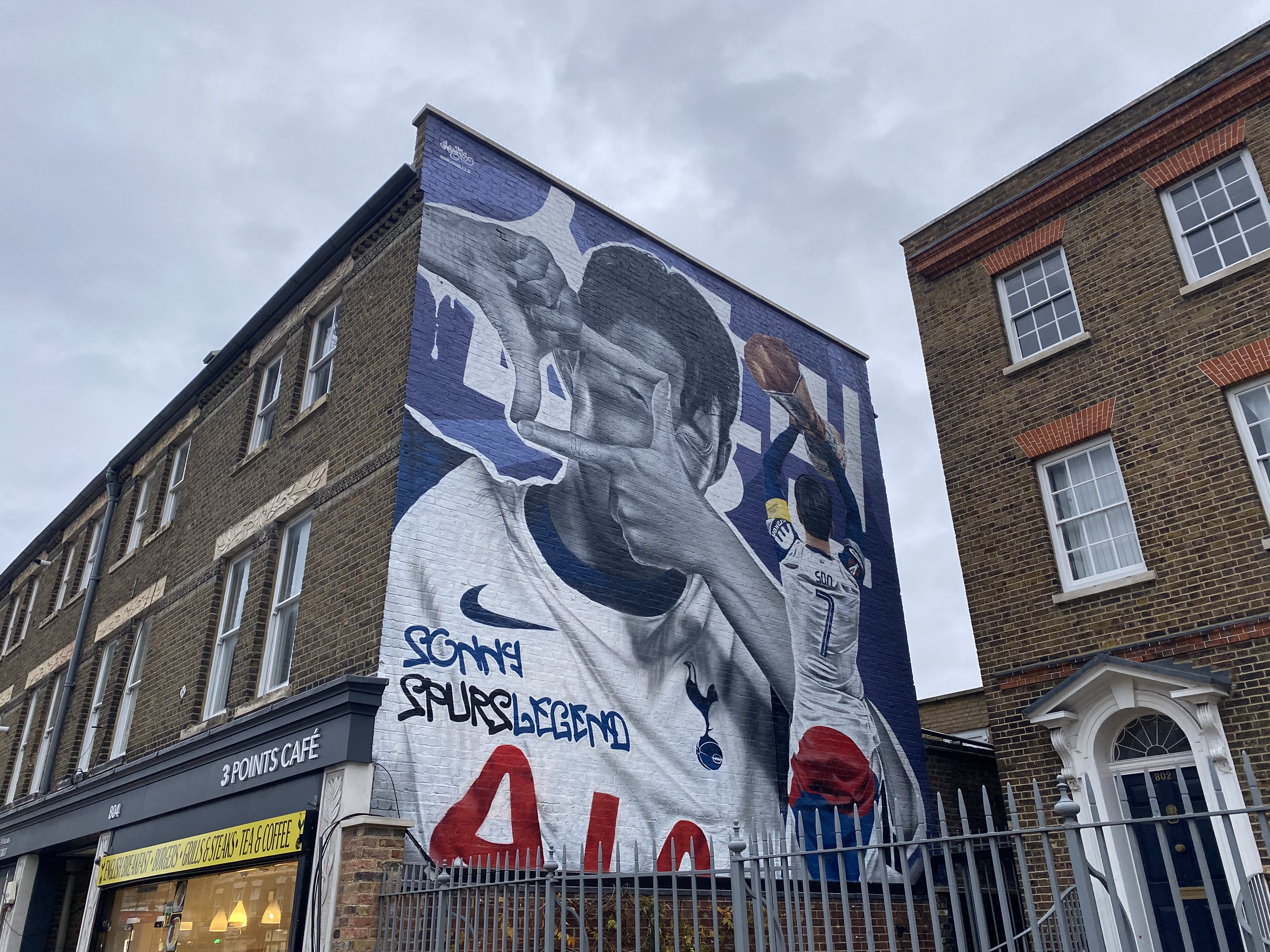
A mural of Son down the street from the Tottenham Hotspur Stadium, unveiled in December 2025

Tottenham Hotspur

- UEFA Europa League: 2024–25
- EFL Cup runner-up: 2020–21
- UEFA Champions League runner-up: 2018–19

South Korea U17

- AFC U-16 Championship runner-up: 2008

South Korea U23

- Asian Games: 2018

South Korea

- AFC Asian Cup runner-up: 2015

Individual

- FIFA Puskás Award: 2020
- Best Footballer in Asia: 2014, 2015, 2017, 2018, 2019, 2020, 2021, 2022, 2023, 2025
- AFC Asian Cup Team of the Tournament: 2015, 2023
- AFC Asian International Player of the Year: 2015, 2017, 2019, 2023
- AFC Opta All-time XI at the FIFA World Cup: 2020
- AFC Fans' All-time XI at the FIFA World Cup: 2020
- AFC Asian Cup All-time XI: 2023
- The Asian Awards Outstanding Achievement in Sports: 2016
- AIPS Asia Best Asian Male Athlete: 2018
- IFFHS Asian Men's Player of the Year: 2020, 2021, 2022
- IFFHS Asian Men's Team of the Year: 2020, 2021, 2022, 2023, 2024, 2025
- IFFHS Asian Men's Player of the Decade: 2021
- IFFHS Asian Men's Team of All Time: 2021
- FourFourTwo Best Asian Footballer of All Time: 2024
- UEFA Champions League Set-piece Goal of the Season: 2014–15
- Eurosport Player of the Season: 2021–22
- CONCACAF Champions Cup top assist provider: 2026
- Bundesliga Debut of the Hinrunde: 2010
- Korean FA Player of the Year: 2013, 2014, 2017, 2019, 2020, 2021, 2022, 2024
- Korean FA Fans' Player of the Year: 2014, 2015
- Korean FA Goal of the Year: 2015, 2016, 2018, 2021, 2023, 2024, 2025
- Gallup Korea's Athlete of the Year: 2015, 2017, 2018, 2019, 2020, 2021, 2022, 2023, 2024, 2025
- Cheongnyong Medal: 2022
- Premier League Player of the Month: September 2016, April 2017, October 2020, September 2023
- Premier League Goal of the Month: November 2018, December 2019
- Premier League Goal of the Season: 2019–20
- Premier League Golden Boot: 2021–22
- FA Cup top goalscorer: 2016–17
- PFA Fans' Premier League Player of the Month: January 2018
- PFA Premier League Team of the Year: 2020–21
- BBC Goal of the Season: 2019–20
- Fantasy Premier League Team of the Season: 2020–21, 2021–22, 2023–24
- MLS Goal of the Year: 2025
- MLS All-Star Game Most Valuable Player: 2026
- MLS All-Star: 2026
- London Football Award for Premier League Player of the Year: 2019
- Hamburger SV All-time XI by Bundesliga: 2018
- Tottenham Hotspur Goal of the Season: 2017–18, 2018–19, 2019–20, 2022–23, 2024–25
- Tottenham Hotspur Player of the Season: 2018–19, 2019–20, 2021–22
- Tottenham Hotspur Goal of the Decade: 2020

Records

- South Korea all-time appearance leader: 150 appearances
- South Korea all-time top goalscorer: 58 goals

== See also ==
- List of men's footballers with 100 or more international caps
- List of men's footballers with 50 or more international goals
- List of footballers with 100 or more Premier League goals
