= Da-som =

Korean name list

- Hangul: 다솜
- RR: Dasom
- MR: Tasom
- IPA: tasom

Da-som (Korean: 다솜) is a Korean given name. Unlike most Korean names, which are composed of two Sino-Korean roots each written with one hanja, "Da-som" is an indigenous Korean name: a single word meaning "love". It is an older variation of the South Korean name Sa-rang; both names carry the meaning of "love". It is one of a number of such indigenous names which became more popular in South Korea in the late 20th century.

== People ==
People with this name include:

- Kim Da-som (born 1993), South Korean actress and singer

== Fictional characters ==
Fictional characters with this name include:

- Choi Da-som, in the 2020 South Korean television series Welcome

== See also ==
- Sa-rang (Korean given name)
- List of Korean given names
