= Namgung =

- Hangul: 남궁
- Hanja: 南宮
- RR: Namgung
- MR: Namgung

Namgung is a Korean surname. It derives from the Chinese character Nangong 南宮.

== Clans ==
In Korea, there is only one Namgung Bon-gwan clan, which is Hamyeol.

Hamyeol Namgung clan claims ancestry from Nangong Kuo, a key adviser in King Wen of Zhou's court. According to them, Namgung Su, a descendant of Nangong Kuo, came alongside Kija to Korea and helped him found Kija Joseon.

In South Korea, statistics from 2000 indicate the Hamyeol Namgung clan has 18,703 members.

== Notable people ==
People with this surname include:

- Namgung Woncheng (南宮元淸), Goryeo general that is noted to be the ancestor of the Hamyeol Namgung clan
- Namgung Shin (南宮信), Goryeo military officer
- Namkoong Won (1934–2024), stage name of South Korean actor Hong Kyung-il
- Namkung Do (born 1982), South Korean football player
- Namkung Joon (born 1920), South Korean arachnologist
- Namkoong Min (born 1978), South Korean actor
- Namkung Woong (born 1984), South Korean football player

=== Fictional ===
- Namgoong Minsu, a character in the movie Snowpiercer portrayed by Song Kang-ho
- Namgoong Hyeonja (남궁 현자), fictional architect in the film Parasite, by Bong Joon-ho
