= South Korea national football team records and statistics =

This list of South Korea national football team records contains statistical accomplishments related to the South Korea national football team, its players, and its managers. The team represents the nation of South Korea in international football. It is governed by the Korea Football Association and competes as a member of the Asian Football Confederation (AFC).

== Player records ==
As of 22 October 2026

Players in bold are still active with South Korea.

=== Most appearances ===
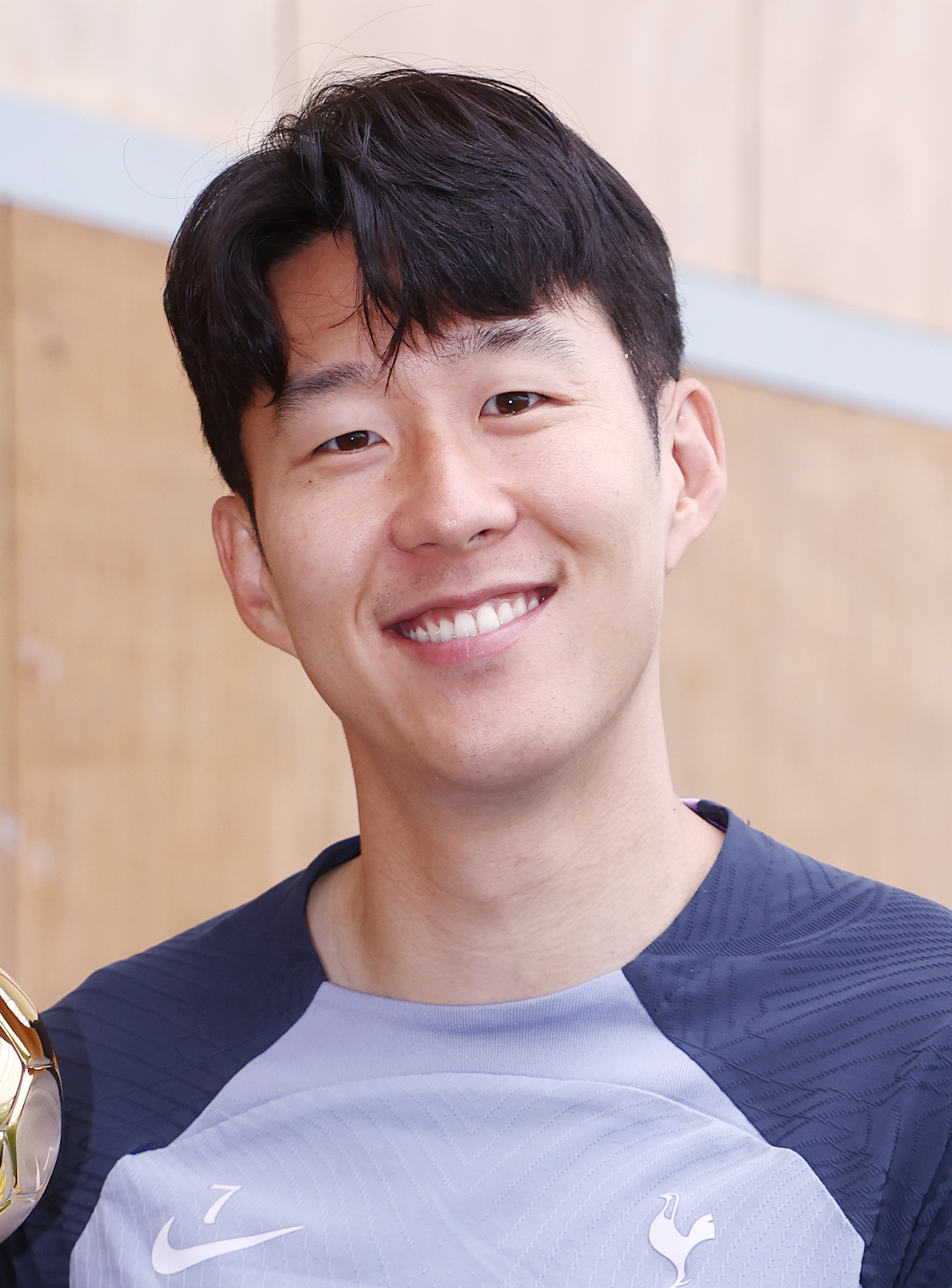
Son Heung-min is South Korea's most-capped player with 151 appearances and top goalscorer with 59 goals.

Rank	Player	Caps	Goals	Career
1	**Son Heung-min**	151	59	2010–present
2	Cha Bum-kun	136	58	1972–1986
2	Hong Myung-bo	136	10	1990–2002
4	Lee Woon-jae	133	0	1994–2010
5	Lee Young-pyo	127	5	1999–2011
6	Kim Ho-kon	124	5	1971–1979
6	Yoo Sang-chul	124	18	1994–2005
8	Cho Young-jeung	113	1	1975–1986
9	Kim Young-gwon	112	7	2010–2024
10	Ki Sung-yueng	110	10	2008–2019
10	**Lee Jae-sung**	110	15	2015–present

=== Top goalscorers ===
Rank	Player	Goals	Caps	Ratio	Career
1	**Son Heung-min**	59	151	0.39	2010–present
2	Cha Bum-kun	58	136	0.43	1972–1986
3	Hwang Sun-hong	50	103	0.49	1988–2002
4	Park Lee-chun	36	88	0.41	1969–1974
5	Kim Jae-han	33	58	0.57	1972–1979
5	Lee Dong-gook	33	105	0.31	1998–2017
7	Kim Do-hoon	30	72	0.42	1994–2003
7	Choi Soon-ho	30	96	0.31	1980–1991
7	Huh Jung-moo	30	104	0.29	1974–1986
10	Choi Yong-soo	27	69	0.39	1995–2003
10	Lee Young-moo	27	85	0.32	1975–1981
10	Kim Jin-kook	27	97	0.28	1972–1978

=== Other records ===
Youngest player
17 years and 241 days, Kim Pan-keun, vs. Thailand, 1 November 1983
Youngest goalscorer
18 years and 87 days, Ko Jong-soo, vs. New Zealand, 25 January 1997
Oldest player
39 years and 274 days, Kim Yong-sik, vs. Hong Kong, 15 April 1950
Oldest goalscorer
39 years and 274 days, Kim Yong-sik, vs. Hong Kong, 15 April 1950
Longest career
19 years and 112 days, Lee Dong-gook, from 16 May 1998 to 5 September 2017
Most goals in a calendar year
16, Park Lee-chun (1972) and Hwang Sun-hong (1994)
Most consecutive matches scored in
6, Ha Seok-ju (1993)
Fastest goal from kick-off
16 seconds, Hwang Hee-chan, vs. Qatar, 17 November 2020
Most hat-tricks
3, Cha Bum-kun and Park Sung-hwa

== Manager records ==
Most matches managed
78, Huh Jung-moo
Most matches managed (unofficial)
126, Kim Jung-nam
Most matches won
54, Ham Heung-chul
Most matches won in an appointment
35, Paulo Bento
Longest career in an appointment
4 years and 106 days, Paulo Bento, from 22 August 2018 to 6 December 2022
Most appointments
5, Kim Yong-sik, Min Byung-dae and Park Jong-hwan

== Team records ==
Biggest victory
16–0 vs. Nepal, 29 September 2003 (2004 AFC Asian Cup qualification)
Highest scoring draw
4–4 vs. Malaysia, 11 September 1976 (1976 Korea Cup)
Heaviest defeat
0–12 vs. Sweden, 5 August 1948 (1948 Summer Olympics)
Most consecutive victories
11, from 29 July 1975 (3–1 vs. Malaysia) to 21 December 1975 (3–1 vs. Burma)
Most consecutive matches without defeat
29, from 20 September 1986 (3–0 vs. India) to 26 June 1989 (0–0 vs. Czechoslovakia)

== Head-to-head record ==
The following table shows South Korea's head-to-head record, correct as of 6 October 2026.

Team	Pld	W	D	L	GF	GA	GD	Win %
Afghanistan	1	1	0	0	8	2	+6	100.00
Algeria	2	1	0	1	4	4	+0	50.00
Angola	1	1	0	0	1	0	+1	100.00
Argentina	3	0	0	3	2	8	−6	0.00
Australia (list)	29	9	11	9	30	29	+1	31.03
Austria	1	0	0	1	0	1	−1	0.00
Bahrain	17	12	4	1	40	12	+28	70.59
Bangladesh	2	2	0	0	13	0	+13	100.00
Belarus	1	0	0	1	0	1	−1	0.00
Belgium	4	0	1	3	2	6	−4	0.00
Bolivia	4	2	2	0	3	0	+3	50.00
Bosnia and Herzegovina	2	1	0	1	3	3	+0	50.00
Brazil	9	1	0	8	6	25	−19	11.11
Brunei	1	1	0	0	3	0	+3	100.00
Bulgaria	2	0	1	1	1	2	−1	0.00
Burkina Faso	1	1	0	0	1	0	+1	100.00
Cambodia	7	6	0	1	22	4	+18	85.71
Cameroon	5	3	2	0	10	3	+7	60.00
Canada	5	2	1	2	5	4	+1	40.00
Chile	3	1	1	1	2	1	+1	33.33
China (list)	39	24	13	2	59	26	+33	61.54
Chinese Taipei	21	14	1	6	50	19	+31	66.67
Colombia	8	4	3	1	14	9	+5	50.00
Costa Rica	10	4	3	3	13	12	+1	40.00
Croatia	7	2	2	3	7	11	−4	28.57
Cuba	1	0	1	0	0	0	+0	0.00
Czech Republic (Note: Including Czechoslovakia.)	6	2	2	2	7	15	−8	33.33
Denmark	2	0	1	1	1	3	−2	0.00
Ecuador	3	2	0	1	6	2	+4	66.67
Egypt	18	6	7	5	18	21	−3	33.33
El Salvador	2	1	1	0	2	1	+1	50.00
England	1	0	1	0	1	1	+0	0.00
Finland	3	3	0	0	5	0	+5	100.00
France	3	0	1	2	3	9	−6	0.00
Georgia	1	0	1	0	2	2	+0	0.00
Germany	4	2	0	2	7	5	+2	50.00
Ghana	8	4	0	4	11	14	−3	50.00
Greece	4	3	1	0	6	1	+5	75.00
Guam	1	1	0	0	9	0	+9	100.00
Guatemala	3	1	1	1	4	3	+1	33.33
Haiti	1	1	0	0	4	1	+3	100.00
Honduras	3	3	0	0	9	0	+9	100.00
Hong Kong	30	23	5	2	71	21	+50	76.67
Hungary	2	0	0	2	0	10	−10	0.00
Iceland	2	2	0	0	6	1	+5	100.00
India	19	14	2	3	48	12	+36	73.68
Indonesia	36	30	4	2	84	19	+65	83.33
Iran	33	10	10	13	36	34	+2	30.30
Iraq	25	11	12	2	32	16	+16	44.00
Israel	11	5	4	2	17	12	+5	45.45
Italy	2	1	0	1	4	4	+0	50.00
Ivory Coast	2	1	0	1	2	4	−2	50.00
Jamaica	4	2	2	0	7	3	+4	50.00
Japan (list)	82	42	23	17	124	77	+47	51.22
Jordan	9	4	4	1	10	7	+3	44.44
Kazakhstan	2	1	1	0	4	1	+3	50.00
Kuwait	26	14	4	8	37	21	+16	53.85
Kyrgyzstan	1	1	0	0	1	0	+1	100.00
Laos	5	5	0	0	28	0	+28	100.00
Latvia	2	2	0	0	2	0	+2	100.00
Lebanon	16	12	3	1	28	5	+23	75.00
Libya	1	1	0	0	4	0	+4	100.00
Macau	3	3	0	0	11	2	+9	100.00
Malaysia	47	26	13	8	81	45	+36	55.32
Maldives	2	1	1	0	2	0	+2	50.00
Mali	1	1	0	0	3	1	+2	100.00
Malta	2	1	1	0	3	2	+1	50.00
Mexico	16	4	3	9	20	32	−12	25.00
Moldova	2	2	0	0	5	0	+5	100.00
Mongolia	1	1	0	0	6	0	+6	100.00
Morocco	2	0	1	1	3	5	−2	0.00
Myanmar	27	15	7	5	42	15	+27	55.56
Nepal	7	7	0	0	53	0	+53	100.00
Netherlands	2	0	0	2	0	7	−7	0.00
New Zealand	7	6	1	0	10	1	+9	85.71
Nigeria	5	3	2	0	9	6	+3	60.00
North Korea (list)	17	7	9	1	14	6	+8	41.18
North Macedonia	2	1	1	0	4	3	+1	50.00
Northern Ireland	1	0	0	1	1	2	−1	0.00
Norway	4	1	1	2	5	6	−1	25.00
Oman	7	5	1	1	14	6	+8	71.43
Pakistan	2	2	0	0	13	0	+13	100.00
Palestine	2	0	2	0	1	1	+0	0.00
Panama	1	0	1	0	2	2	+0	0.00
Paraguay	8	3	4	1	10	7	+3	37.50
Peru	3	0	1	2	0	5	−5	0.00
Philippines	8	8	0	0	37	0	+37	100.00
Poland	2	1	0	1	4	3	+1	50.00
Portugal	2	2	0	0	3	1	+2	100.00
Qatar	11	6	2	3	19	13	+6	54.55
Romania	1	0	0	1	1	2	−1	0.00
Russia	3	0	1	2	4	7	−3	0.00
Saudi Arabia	19	5	9	5	20	18	+2	26.32
Scotland	1	1	0	0	4	1	+3	100.00
Senegal	4	1	1	2	3	4	−1	25.00
Serbia	3	1	1	1	3	3	+0	33.33
Serbia and Montenegro	1	1	0	0	2	0	+2	100.00
Singapore	28	23	3	2	97	19	+78	82.14
Slovakia	1	0	1	0	0	0	+0	0.00
South Africa	1	0	0	1	0	1	−1	0.00
South Yemen	1	1	0	0	3	0	+3	100.00
Spain	6	0	2	4	5	16	−11	0.00
Sri Lanka	3	3	0	0	19	0	+19	100.00
Sudan	1	1	0	0	8	0	+8	100.00
Sweden	5	0	2	3	3	18	−15	0.00
Switzerland	2	1	0	1	2	3	−1	50.00
Syria	10	6	3	1	12	5	+7	60.00
Tajikistan	1	1	0	0	4	1	+3	100.00
Thailand	47	31	8	8	96	37	+59	65.96
Togo	1	1	0	0	2	1	+1	100.00
Trinidad and Tobago	2	1	1	0	6	1	+5	50.00
Tunisia	3	1	1	1	4	1	+3	33.33
Turkey	7	1	2	4	4	13	−9	14.29
Turkmenistan	5	4	0	1	16	4	+12	80.00
Ukraine	2	2	0	0	3	0	+3	100.00
United Arab Emirates	21	13	5	3	38	14	+24	61.90
United States	12	6	3	3	12	8	+4	50.00
Uruguay	11	1	2	8	8	19	−11	9.09
Uzbekistan	17	12	4	1	36	14	+22	70.59
Venezuela	2	1	1	0	3	1	+2	50.00
Vietnam (Note: Including South Vietnam.)	25	17	6	2	66	21	+45	68.00
Wales	1	0	1	0	0	0	+0	0.00
Yemen (Note: Including North Yemen.)	1	1	0	0	6	0	+6	100.00
Yugoslavia (Note: Including SFR Yugoslavia and FR Yugoslavia.)	7	0	3	4	4	13	−9	0.00
Zambia	4	2	0	2	10	8	+2	50.00
Total	1,012	547	247	218	1,818	931	+887	54.05
