= Nangong (surname) =

Chinese surname

Namgung

Chinese name
- Traditional Chinese: 南宮
- Simplified Chinese: 南宫
Transcriptions
Standard Mandarin
- Hanyu Pinyin: Nángōng
- Bopomofo: ㄋㄢˊ ㄍㄨㄥ
Yue: Cantonese
- Jyutping: naam^{4} gung^{1}
Southern Min
- Hokkien POJ: Lâm-kiong

Vietnamese name
- Vietnamese alphabet: Nam Cung
- Hán-Nôm: 南宮

Korean name
- Hangul: 남궁
- Hanja: 南宮
Transcriptions
- Revised Romanization: Namgung

Japanese name
- Kanji: 南宮
- Hiragana: なんぐう なんきゅう
Transcriptions
- Romanization: Nangū; Nankyū

Nangong is a Chinese surname that sees varying levels of use in East Asia.

Regardless of country, Nangong is considered to be an uncommon surname, as only a small number of people have the surname.

== Mainland China ==
In Mainland China, the surname Nangong appears in the Song dynasty book Hundred Family Surnames. According to a statistical analysis released by the National Bureau of Statistics of China in 2014, Nangong is estimated to be the surname for 13,000 people in China in 2010.

== Hong Kong ==
In Hong Kong, Namgung is a surname that is often associated with the "Mailbox of Madame Namgung" (南宮夫人信箱), a Dear Abby-style advice column in the 1950s and 1960s that often dispenses tips and advises related to Human sexuality.

== Japan ==
In Japan, the surname Nangū is estimated to be the surname of about 200 people, with half of them concentrated in the Hyōgo Prefecture, Osaka Prefecture, and Tokyo.

== Notable people ==
People with this surname include:

=== Mainland China ===
- Nangong Kuo, a disciple of Confucius.
- Nangong Kuo (Western Zhou), Zhou dynasty political figure.
- Nangong Wan, a general of the Song State during the Warring States period.

=== Hong Kong/Taiwan ===
- Naamgung Bok (南宮博), novelist.

=== Fictional characters ===
- Nangong Yu, a playable character in Zenless Zone Zero.

== See also ==
- Chinese compound surname
- Namgung, Korean version of this surname
