= Son Woong-jung =

South Korean footballer (born 1962)

Personal information
- Date of birth: 10 June 1962 (age 64)
- Place of birth: Seosan, South Korea
- Position: Forward

Youth career
- Chunchon High School

College career
Years	Team	Apps	(Gls)
1984	Myongji University		

Senior career*
Years	Team	Apps	(Gls)
1985–1986	Sangmu FC (draft)	7	(0)
1987–1988	Hyundai Horang-i	20	(5)
1989–1990	Ilhwa Chunma	10	(2)
Total		37	(7)

International career
1986–1987	South Korea B		
Korean name
Hangul	손웅정
Hanja	孫雄政
RR	Son Ungjeong
MR	Son Ungjŏng
- * Club domestic league appearances and goals

Son Woong-jung (Korean: 손웅정; born 10 June 1962) is a South Korean former footballer who played as a forward. He is the father of current South Korea national team captain Son Heung-min.

== Playing career ==
Son joined Myongji University in 1984 after graduating from high school. He scored the winning goal four minutes before the end of the Korean President's Cup final, contributing to Myongji's first national title.

Son spent his senior career in Sangmu FC, Hyundai Horang-i, and Ilhwa Chunma. He was also selected for the South Korea national football B team in 1987.

== Honours ==
Myongji University

- Korean President's Cup: 1984
