= Hamyeol Namgung clan =

Korean clan from North Jeolla Province

- Country: Korea
- Current region: Iksan
- Founder: Namgung Won cheong
- Connected members: Namkoong Min; Namkung Do; Namkung Woong
- Website: http://www.namgoong.or.kr/

Hamyeol Namgung clan (Korean: 함열 남궁씨; Hanja: 咸悅 南宮氏) is one of the Korean clans. Their Bon-gwan is in Iksan, North Jeolla Province. According to the research held in 2015, the number of Hamyeol Namgung clan was 20715. Namgung su (Hanja: 南宮修) who was the Imperial family in Zhou dynasty, China started Korean Namgung clan. When Gija conquered Korea, Namgung su (Hanja: 南宮修) founded Gija Joseon with Gija and worked as Situ (office). Namgung su (Hanja: 南宮修) taught Koreans etiquette, agriculture, rice farming, sericulture and weaving. The founder of Hamyeol Namgung clan was Namgung Won cheong who was a descendant of Namgung su (Hanja: 南宮修). Namgung Won cheong worked as Four-star rank and Pingzhangshi (Hanja: 平章事) in Goryeo.

== See also ==
- Korean clan names of foreign origin
