= Article 809 of the Korean Civil Code =

South Korean law nullified in 2005

Article 809 of the Korean Civil Code (Korean: 민법 제809조) was the codification of a traditional rule prohibiting marriage between men and women who have the same surname resulting from belonging to the same clan and possessing the same genealogical patriline and sharing the same ancestral home (bon-gwan). On 16 July 1997, the Constitutional Court of Korea ruled the article unconstitutional. The National Assembly of South Korea passed an amendment to the Article in March 2002, which came into force on 31 March 2005, and prohibited marriage only between men and women who are closely related (i.e. consanguine marriage, in South Korea, consanguine marriage is defined as marriage between two family members with degree of relationship 8 or less).

== Rules restricting marriage ==
In Korea, a child inherits his or her father’s surname. Traditionally, men and women who have the same surnames and "ancestral homes", called dongseong dongbon (동성동본; 同姓同本), are not permitted to marry.

The rule, called honinbeop (혼인법; 婚姻法), originated in China, and can be traced back at least to the late Joseon period. In the context of Confucianism, the rule was a mechanism to maintain family identities and ensure the integrity of the family as a sociopolitical institution.

The marriage rule was codified as Article 809 in 1957. It read as follows:

Article 809 [Prohibition of marriage between parties whose surname and ancestral home are common] (1): A marriage may not be allowed between blood relatives, if both surname and its origin are common to the parties.

Distribution of ancestral lines of the surname Kim.

Those surnamed Kim, for example, can be divided between 282 different blood ancestors, each of whom are identified with a different ancestral home. The two most populous branches of the Kim clans are Gimhae (with 4 million members) and Gyeongju (1.5 million members). As these two Kim clans descend from different patrilineages, a Gimhae Kim and a Gyeongju Kim can marry. Before the 1997 Constitutional Court decision, however, two members of the 4 million Gimhae Kim could not marry, regardless of the distance of their relationship.

Because of population growth, greater mobility and increasing urbanisation in South Korea, the chance of meeting and falling in love with someone from one's own patrilineage was much greater. It was especially a problem for the three largest Korean clans, the Gimhae Kims, the Miryang Parks, and the Jeonju Yis.

Despite Article 809, many men and women sharing the same patrilineage chose to live together as husband and wife. The common surname marriage ban was temporarily lifted by special acts three times, each for a period of one year, in 1977, 1987, and 1995. At the time of the first special act in 1977, 4577 same name/common ancestor couples became legally married. In 1988 the number increased to 12,443, and by 1996, it had reached 27,807. Some estimate that the actual number is as high as 200,000 couples, nearly 2 percent of all married couples in South Korea. The children born of such marriages were, legally, out-of-wedlock. They were not eligible for national health insurance and were discriminated against in matters of inheritance and property rights.

The Korean Legal Aid Center for Family Relations established a special report and counselling facility for couples subject to Article 809.

Article 809 has been much criticised by family lawyers and the Korean Law Association on the ground that it infringes on the freedom of choice in marriage, and that it reinforces traditional paternalism.

== Constitutional case ==
On 20 May 1995 the Family Court of Seoul referred to the Constitutional Court the case brought forth by eight couples who asked the court to evaluate the constitutionality of Article 809. They argued that the code violated the "right to the pursuit of happiness" and the "right to family life" guaranteed by articles 10 and 36, respectively, in the "Chapter 2. Right and Duties of Citizens" of the Constitution of the Republic of Korea.

Two years later, the Constitutional Court ruled 7 to 2 against Article 809. The court held that Article 809(1) was incompatible with the Constitution and that if the National Assembly did not amend it by 31 December 1998, it would become null and void, commencing on 1 January 1999. The court declared that until the National Assembly amended the article, other courts and government agencies, including local governments, should not apply it.

In accordance with this declaration, the Supreme Court of Korea announced new family registration procedures for the applications filed by couples sharing surname and ancestral home before the revision. In addition, parts of the Rules of the Supreme Court on Family Register that prohibited the registration of marriage between these couples (Rule No. 172) and that concerned mistaken registration (Rule No. 176) were abolished.

The majority opinion stated that:

the law against marriages between members of the same agnatic lineage descendants violates the dignity of human beings and the right to the pursuit of happiness as guaranteed by the Constitution as well as the right to free marriages and equality.

The majority emphasized the individual's freedom of marriage and asserted that:

majority of the public's concept of marriage has changed from one of "a union between families" to one of "a union between persons", reflecting the respect for a person's free will."

Two justices dissented. The first dissenting opinion emphasized that marriage should be publicly recognised through social norms such as customs, morals, and religion, and dismissed individual freedom as relatively unimportant. It stressed the succession of traditional culture prescribed in Article 9 of the Constitution.

== Legislative response ==
The Ministry of Justice presented a Reform Bill to the National Assembly on 13 November 1998, including the repeal of Article 809. In the face of fierce opposition from Confucian groups, Article 809 was excluded from the bill by the Sub-committee on Law of the National Assembly, despite the 31 December 1998 deadline imposed by the Constitutional Court.

On 17 December 1999, the Sub-committee stated that:

In view of the national sentiment which places a great deal of importance on bloodline the abolition of the law prohibiting marriages between people with the same surnames and same ancestral seats is premature.

As the term of the 15th National Assembly ended in May 2000, the Reform Bill automatically died.

Following the April 2004 elections, the Ministry of Justice reintroduced its Reform Bill. On 2 March 2005, the National Assembly passed the Korean Family Law Reform Bill, which came into effect on 31 March of the same year. Among the amendments to Korean family law included a reformed version of Article 809:

Marriage may not be allowed between parties whose relationship of blood relative exists within the eighth degree (including the blood relatives for the real-adopted child kept before real-adoption).

Marriage may not be allowed between parties if either of them is or was the spouse of blood relative within the sixth degree of relationship, or if either of them is or was the blood relatives within sixth degree of relationship of the spouse, or if either of them is or was the spouse of blood relatives by affinity within fourth degree of relationship of the spouse.

Marriage may not be allowed between parties whose relationship of blood relative existed within the sixth degree of adoptive parents lineage and within the fourth degree of adoptive parents affinity.

In the context of the above law, the term degree, called chon (촌; 寸) in Korean, refers to the distance of kinship between two persons. Siblings are considered to be separated by two chons, while children and parents are separated by one chon. Accordingly, a relationship between first cousins would be separated by four chons, and second cousins by six.

Since the current Article 809 of the Korean Civil Code prohibits marriage between relatives within the third cousins (8촌, palchon). This is the broadest legal scope for consanguineous marriage anywhere in the world. Additionally, South Korea is the only country in the world that prohibits marriage up to third cousins. These legal provisions are likely to become the source of legal disputes in the future, as the scope of "relatives" that South Korean people actually recognise has become extremely narrow as South Korean society has become more nuclear-based.

For example, a couple might marry without knowing that they are third cousins, making their marriage invalid under the law. A person in such a position filed a constitutional complaint with the Constitutional Court of Korea over this matter. The court ruled that the ban was constitutional, but overturned the legal provisions invalidating a marriage that had already taken place.

Accordingly, the Ministry of Justice conducted a study to review narrowing the scope of relatives subject to the current marriage ban (from third cousin to first cousin), but according to a public opinion poll conducted by the Ministry of Justice, 75% of those who responded that the appropriate scope of the ban was "within third cousins, as is the current law", followed by within second cousins (15%) and first cousins (5%).

== See also ==
- Confucianism
- Marriage in South Korea
- Incest
