= Ha-neul =

- Hangul: 하늘
- RR: Haneul
- MR: Hanŭl

Ha-neul, also spelled Ha-nul or Hah-nul, is a Korean given name. Unlike most Korean given names, which are composed of two single-syllable Sino-Korean morphemes each written with one hanja, Ha-neul is an indigenous Korean name: a single two-syllable word meaning "sky". As a name, it may loosely be interpreted as an exhortation to "spread your dreams high like the sky". It is one of a number of such native names (called 고유어 이름, goyueo ireum) which have become more popular in South Korea in recent decades.

== People ==
People with this name include:

=== Entertainment ===
- Kim Ha-neul (born 1978), South Korean actress
- Rottyful Sky, (born Kim Ha-neul, 1988–2013), South Korean singer and composer
- Kang Ha-neul (born 1990), South Korean actor

=== Sport ===
- Kim Ha-neul (golfer) (born 1988), South Korean golfer
- Kwon Hah-nul (born 1988), South Korean football player
- Kim Ha-nul (figure skater) (born 2002), South Korean figure skater

== See also ==
- List of Korean given names
