= Sa-rang (Korean given name) =

- Hangul: 사랑
- RR: Sarang
- MR: Sarang
- IPA: [saɾaŋ]

Sa-rang is a Korean given name. The word itself is a native Korean word meaning "love" and does not have corresponding Hanja. However, since Korean given names can be created arbitrarily, it may also be a name with Hanja (e.g. 思朗).

== People ==
People with this name include:

- Kim Sa-rang (actress) (born 1978), South Korean actress
- Kim Sa-rang (singer) (born 1981), South Korean rock singer-songwriter
- Kim Sa-rang (badminton) (born 1989), South Korean badminton player
- Park Sa-rang (born 2003), South Korean actress
- Ryu Sa-rang (born 2007), South Korean musician (member of IZNA)

== Fictional characters ==
- Kim Sa-rang, in the 2014 South Korean television drama I'm Dying Soon
- Cha Sa-rang, in the 2015 South Korean television series Super Daddy Yeol
- Oh Sa-rang, in the 2017 South Korean television series School 2017
- Maeng Sa-rang, in the 2018 South Korean television series Sweet Revenge 2
- Cheon Sa-rang, in the 2023 South Korean television series King the Land

== See also ==
- List of Korean given names
