= Bit-na =

- Hangul: 빛나
- RR: Bitna
- MR: Pinna
- IPA: [pinna]

Bit-na (pronounced Bin-na) is a Korean given name. Unlike most Korean given names, it is not composed of Sino-Korean morphemes which can be written with hanja, but is an indigenous Korean word: the root form of the Korean verb binnada (빛나다), meaning "to shine".

People with this name include:

- Binna Choi (born 1977), South Korean curator
- Wang Bit-na (born 1981), South Korean actress
- Park Bit-na (born 1985), South Korean figure skater
- Ashley Bichna Choi (born 1991), member of South Korean girl group Ladies' Code
- Lee Bit-na (born 1995), South Korean actress

Fictional characters with this name include:

- Geum Bit-na, character in 2013 South Korean television series Queen of the Office
- Oh Bit-na, character in 2013 South Korean television series Shining Romance
- Yoo Bit-na, character in 2017 South Korean television series School 2017
- Oh Bit-na, character in 2021 South Korean Netflix series Nevertheless
- Kang Bit-na, character in 2024 South Korean television series The Judge from Hell

== See also ==
- List of Korean given names
