= Best Footballer in Asia 2019 =

7th annual Best Footballer in Asia award

The Best Footballer in Asia 2019, recognizing the best male footballer in Asia in 2019, is the 7th edition of the Best Footballer in Asia, presented by Titan Sports. Son Heung-min won the award on 3 January 2020. It was his 3rd Best Footballer in Asia title in a row, and the 5th in the previous 6 years. The event was judged by a panel of 51 sports journalists. With 31.6% of all points awarded, Son Heung-min achieved the highest tally of Best Footballer in Asia in history at the time.

== Voting ==
51 judges were invited to vote, including 37 representatives from AFC nations/regions which comprise Afghanistan, Australia, Bahrain, Bangladesh, Cambodia, China, Chinese Taipei, Hong Kong, India, Indonesia, Iran, Iraq, Japan, Jordan, Korea Republic, Kuwait, Kyrgyzstan, Lebanon, Macao, Malaysia, Maldives, Myanmar, Oman, Pakistan, Palestine, Philippines, Qatar, Saudi Arabia, Singapore, Syria, Tajikistan, Thailand, Turkmenistan, United Arabic Emirates, Uzbekistan, Vietnam and Yemen. The other fourteen jurors were independent Asian football experts or from well-known football media outlets. Before voting, all judges were given a 24-player shortlist, but could choose other eligible players.

== Rules ==
Each juror selects 5 best footballers and awards them 6, 4, 3, 2 and 1 point respectively from their first choice to the fifth choice. A trophy for the Best Footballer in Asia is awarded to the player with the highest total of points.

=== Tiebreakers ===
When two or more candidates obtain the same points, the rankings of the concerned candidates would be based upon the following criteria in order:

- a) The number of 1st-place vote obtained
- b) The number of 2nd-place vote obtained
- c) The number of 3rd-place vote obtained
- d) The number of 4th-place vote obtained

If all conditions are equal, the concerned candidates tie.

If the concerned candidates are tied for first place, the award and the trophy are shared.

== Ranking ==
Rank	Name	Club(s)	Points
1	(South Korea) Son Heung-min	(England) Tottenham Hotspur	258
2	(Qatar) Akram Afif	(Qatar) Al-Sadd	114
3	(Japan) Takumi Minamino	(Austria) Red Bull Salzburg	90
4	(Qatar) Almoez Ali	(Qatar) Al-Duhail	64
5	(Iran) Sardar Azmoun	(Russia) Zenit Saint Petersburg	59
6	(France) Bafétimbi Gomis	(Saudi Arabia) Al-Hilal	49
7	(China) Wu Lei	(Spain) Espanyol	29
8	(Saudi Arabia) Salem Al-Dawsari	(Saudi Arabia) Al-Hilal	26
9	(Algeria) Baghdad Bounedjah	(Qatar) Al-Sadd	15
10	(Brazil) Paulinho	(China) Guangzhou Evergrande	14
11	(South Korea) Lee Kang-in	(Spain) Valencia	13
12	(Thailand) Theerathon Bunmathan	(Japan) Yokohama F. Marinos	10
13	(Uzbekistan) Eldor Shomurodov	(Russia) Rostov	10
14	(Italy) Sebastian Giovinco	(Saudi Arabia) Al-Hilal	9
15	(Syria) Omar Al Somah	(Saudi Arabia) Al-Ahli	8
16	(Japan) Yuya Osako	(Germany) Werder Bremen	8
17	(Vietnam) Nguyễn Quang Hải	(Vietnam) Hanoi	8
18	(Australia) Mathew Ryan	(England) Brighton & Hove Albion	7
19	(United Arab Emirates) Ali Mabkhout	(United Arab Emirates) Al-Jazira	7
20	(Japan) Yuto Nagatomo	(Turkey) Galatasaray	5
21	(Iraq) Mohanad Ali	(Iraq) Al-Shorta (Qatar) Al-Duhail	4
22	(India) Sunil Chhetri	(India) Bengaluru	4
23	(Saudi Arabia) Yasser Al-Shahrani	(Saudi Arabia) Al-Hilal	2
24	(Turkmenistan) Arslanmyrat Amanow	(Uzbekistan) Lokomotiv Tashkent	1
24	(China) Elkeson	(China) Shanghai SIPG (China) Guangzhou Evergrande	1
24	(Australia) Adam Taggart	(Australia) Brisbane Roar (South Korea) Suwon Samsung Bluewings	1
