= Nguyễn Quang Hải (footballer, born 1997) =

Vietnamese footballer (born 1997)

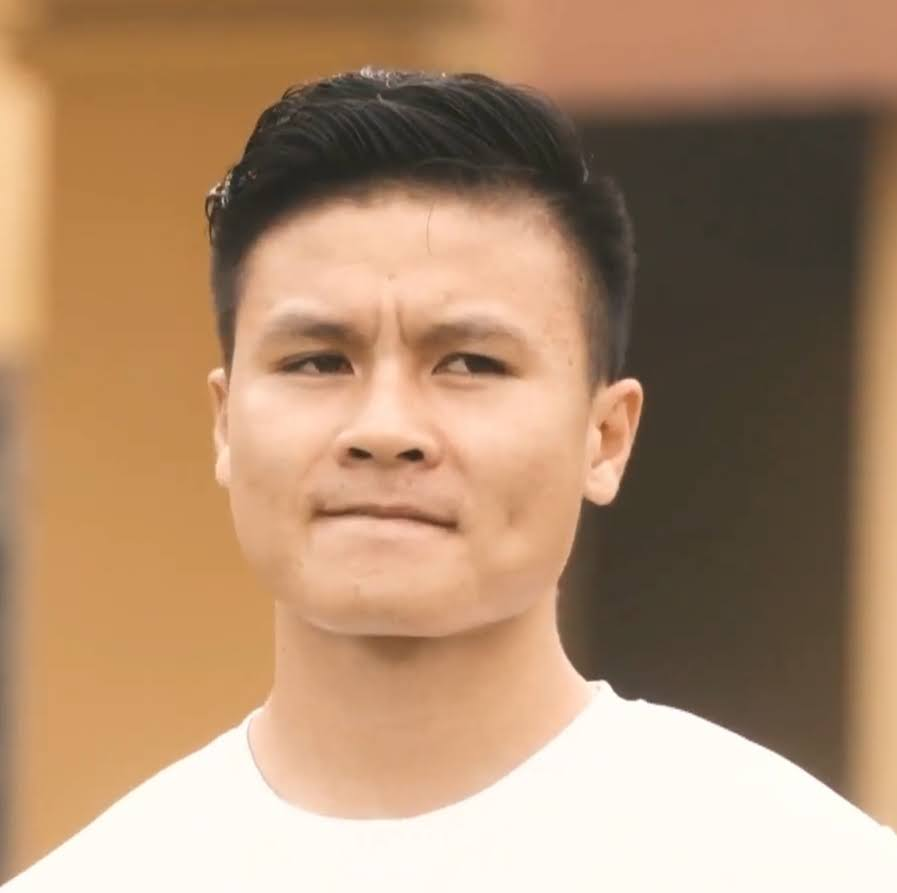
- Quang Hải in 2019

Personal information
- Full name: Nguyễn Quang Hải
- Date of birth: 12 April 1997 (age 29)
- Place of birth: Đông Anh, Hanoi, Vietnam
- Height: 1.68 m (5 ft 6 in)
- Positions: Attacking midfielder; winger

Team information
- Current team: Công An Hà Nội
- Number: 19

Youth career
- 2006–2014: Hà Nội T&T

Senior career*
Years	Team	Apps	(Gls)
2014–2022	Hà Nội	127	(31)
2014	→ Công An Nhân Dân (loan)	4	(0)
2015	→ Hà Nội (2011) (loan)	13	(4)
2022–2023	Pau	13	(1)
2023	Pau B	7	(0)
2023–	Công An Hà Nội	85	(15)

International career^{‡}
2011–2014	Vietnam U17	9	(2)
2014–2017	Vietnam U20	26	(1)
2017–2020	Vietnam U23	35	(12)
2017–	Vietnam	88	(16)
Medal record
Men's football
Representing Vietnam
AFC U-23 Championship
Runner-up	2018 China	Team
ASEAN Championship
Winner	ASEAN 2018	Team
Runner-up	ASEAN 2022	Team
Winner	ASEAN 2024	Team
Winner	ASEAN 2026	Team
SEA Games
Gold medal – first place	2019 Philippines	Team
- * Club domestic league appearances and goals as of 31 October 2026 ‡ National team caps and goals as of 26 August 2026

Nguyễn Quang Hải (born 12 April 1997) is a Vietnamese professional footballer who plays as an attacking midfielder or winger and captains both for V.League 1 club Công An Hà Nội and the Vietnam national team. Widely regarded as one of the best players in Southeast Asia and one of the best Vietnamese footballers, he is known for his finishing, ball control, vision, and playmaking.

Quang Hải represented Vietnam at the 2019 and 2023 AFC Asian Cup. He is Vietnam's current record appearance holder.

In 2018 and 2019, he was nominated by a panel of sports journalists and football experts for the Best Footballer in Asia award.

== Early life and youth career ==
Quang Hải was born in Đông Anh in 1997. He joined Hanoi T&T's youth academy at the age of 9; by 2013, he had begun playing in the under-21 league at the age of 16.

After playing for Vietnam at various youth levels, Quang Hải made his debut for the Vietnam national team against Jordan in June 2017. His first goal came against Cambodia in September 2017.

== Club career ==
=== Hà Nội ===
A product of the capital club Hà Nội, Quang Hải made his senior debut in 2014 with Công An Nhân Dân in the 2014 Vietnamese Second Division. He helped the club promoted to the 2015 V.League 2, and was immediately promoted to Hà Nội's first team. There, Quang Hải made his professional debut in 2014 for the club. In just 3 years, he rose to become one of the most promising players of the club, winning the 2015 V.League 2 before repeating the feat in the 2016 V.League 1. Following a successful Vietnam run in the 2018 AFC U-23 Championship in which he demonstrated a stellar performance, he became a regular face of the club as he played a major role in the club's winning two consecutive V.League seasons in 2018 and 2019. He also helped the club to win the Vietnamese National Football Cup consecutively in 2019 and 2020.

In March 2022, Quang Hải announced that he would leave the club, expressing his desire to go to Europe to cement his career. His last match for his home club was on 7 April 2022, when his club won 4–0 against Cong An Nhan Dan. Although he didn't score, he provided an assist in this win.

=== Pau ===
On 29 June 2022, following rumors about his future, Quang Hải joined Ligue 2 club Pau on a two-season contract, making him the first Vietnamese player to join a French football club.

On 30 July 2022, he made his first league appearance for Pau, subbed on for Eddy Sylvestre in the 59th minute in the 4-0 away loss against Guingamp. On 8 October 2022, he scored his first goal for Pau in the 86th minute in a home match against Rodez. He scored Pau's second goal of the match, after a brief 8-minute period of playing time, to tie the match 2–2; this scoreline held to full-time.

=== Công An Hà Nội ===
In the summer of 2023, Quang Hải returned to Vietnam to play for Công An Hà Nội.

Quang Hải made his debut for Cong An Hanoi in a 1-0 away defeat against SHB Đà Nẵng. He scored the first goal for the club in the derby game against Viettel from a penalty, contributing to a 3–0 win. In the final round of the 2023 V.League 1, Quang Hải made an assist against Thanh Hóa to score the equalizer to help Cong An Ha Noi maintain their first place in the table, winning the league for the first time since 1984.

In the 2023–24 season, Quang Hải scored 8 goals in V.League 1, but the club got no titles and were ranked 6th in the final league rankings.

Quang Hải scored 5 goals in 37 matches in the 2024-25 season, helping Công An Hà Nội win the National Cup after defeating Sông Lam Nghệ An 5-0 in the final. The club also finished second at the ASEAN Club Championship.

== International career ==
=== Under-16 to under-20 ===
Nguyễn Quang Hải was called up for the 2012 AFC U-16 Championship qualification at the age of only 14.

After an impressive performance in the 2014 AFC U-19 Championship, Quang Hải was called up to the national U-19 side. He went on to represent the U-19 team in the 2014 AFF U-19 Youth Championship and the Bruneian Hassanal Bolkiah Championship, where Vietnam finished as runner-up on both occasions.

He made a significant contribution in Vietnam's 2016 AFC U-19 Championship campaign. In the second game against the United Arab Emirates, he assisted Hồ Minh Dĩ in Vietnam's opening goal. Vietnam went on to beat host Bahrain in the quarterfinal, thus qualifying for the 2017 FIFA U-20 World Cup. This was Vietnam's first appearance in a youth FIFA World Cup tournament.

He captained the Vietnam U-20 in the 2017 FIFA U-20 World Cup group stage matches against Honduras and France.

=== Under-23 ===
Quang Hải was first called up to the U23 national team for a friendly against the Malaysia U-23 team in February 2017. He was then included in the Vietnam squad for the 2017 Southeast Asian Games. In a decisive game against Thailand, he was on the bench for the first half, but immediately made an impact in the second after being fouled by Ratthanakorn Maikami in the penalty area. Nguyễn Công Phượng, however, missed the spot-kick; Vietnam went on to lose 3-0 and was eliminated from the tournament.

The appointment of head coach Park Hang-seo saw a significant improvement in the under-23 team hierarchy, as Quang Hải started becoming untouchable in the team's front 3. He was widely praised as a national hero during the historic 2018 AFC U-23 Championship campaign, as the Vietnam U-23 upset major title contenders en route to their very first continental final.

Quang Hải had been instrumental for the team from the group stage, scoring both of the team's 2 goals; the goal against Australia ensured him a man of the match award. He also converted his penalty kick during the shootout in the quarterfinal against Iraq, thus securing Vietnam a spot in the semi-final. Quang Hải's performance against Qatar in the semi-final was widely believed to be his best. Quang Hải leveled the score with a low range half-volley in the 69th minute, only for Almoez Ali to regain Qatar's lead in the 87th. He immediately struck back, controlling a loose ball following a free kick, then faking a shot to dribble past through two defenders before placing the shot into the far corner; this happened within a minute following Almoez Ali's goal. He later missed his penalty kick in the shootout, but Vietnam ended up winning 4–3 and advanced to the final. In the final, Quang Hải once again impressed, equalizing the score with a free kick goal. The goal, nicknamed "rainbow in the snow" by the media, has become a symbol for the unprecedented emotional excitement brought to the Vietnamese people by the historic campaign, as well as the national spirit that went with it. The goal was later voted as the goal of the tournament. Vietnam, however, lost to Uzbekistan in the last minute of extra time of the final.

He was widely considered to be one of the best players of the tournament, being inducted into several teams of the tournament by various sources. His ability to score from long range was one of the key technical talking points mentioned by the AFC. There were even aggressive criticisms by the Southeast Asian media towards the AFC for not awarding the Most Valuable Player to Quang Hải. At the end of the tournament, Quang Hải, along with teammate Bui Tien Dung, was awarded the 3rd class Labor Order for his impressive performance.

Quang Hải was named into Vietnam’s Asian Games 2018 lineup. Quang Hải scored one goal in Vietnam’s 3–0 win over Pakistan. In a match against Japan, he scored the only goal of the match, leading Vietnam to defeat Japan and top the group. Vietnam proceeded to make it to the semi-finals for the first time in their history at the Asian games, where they were defeated by South Korea 3–1. Vietnam later lost to the UAE in a penalty shootout in the bronze medal match.

Quang Hải captained and scored one goal for Vietnam in the 2019 Southeast Asian Games in a 6–1 win against Laos before he was injured in a match against Singapore and missed the rest of the tournament. However, Vietnam still went on without him to defeat Indonesia in the final to win the gold medal, their first gold in the SEA games football competition since South Vietnam won in 1959.

=== Senior national team ===
On 13 June 2017, Quang Hải made his international debut for the Vietnam senior team against Jordan, in a match that ended in a 0–0 draw. He scored his first senior goal for Vietnam against Cambodia on 5 September 2017, coming on as a substitute and scoring a late winner.

In the 2018 AFF Suzuki Cup, Quang Hải played every minute but 2 as Vietnam won its first Southeast Asian football championship in 10 years. In the first three games of the group stages, he was given a midfield position by head coach Park Hang-seo contrary to his usual position as a winger, which raised questions among fans. In the last game against Cambodia, he reclaimed a spot in the front 3 and was immediately awarded man of the match. He played as an advanced playmaker for the rest of the tournament, getting awarded man of the match twice after. The first was in the semi-final second leg against the Philippines, where he broke the deadlock and helped secure the first home win in the knockout phase of the AFF Championship for Vietnam. The last one was clinched as he assisted Nguyễn Anh Đức for the winning goal in the final against Malaysia. At the end of the tournament, he was a part of the team of the AFF Cup's Best XI, and was chosen as the Most Valuable Player. He was honorably given the second-class Labor Order by Prime Minister Nguyễn Xuân Phúc. He won the Vietnamese Golden Ball a few days later, thanks largely to his performance in the AFF Championship.

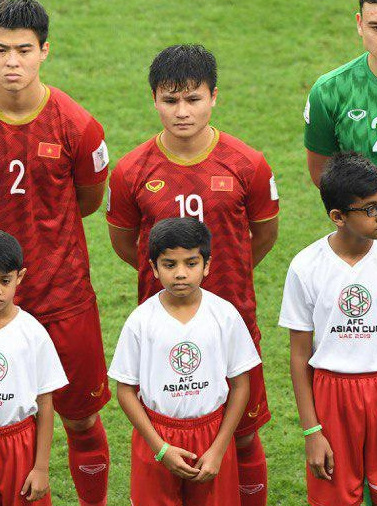
Quang Hai in 2019 AFC Asian Cup

Quang Hải gained an international reputation in the 2019 AFC Asian Cup, when he played an instrumental part in Vietnam's amazing run in the tournament, including a stunning free kick goal against Yemen that allowed Vietnam to win 2–0 and make it into the knockout rounds. Vietnam defeated Jordan in the round of 16, but fell short 1–0 to the eventual runners-up of the tournament, Japan, in the quarterfinals. Still, Quang Hải was named Man of the Match on both Vietnam's wins in the tournament, and was inducted into the tournament's official all-star squad by the AFC Technical Committee. On 8 November 2019, he defeated Chanathip Songkrasin of Thailand to win the AFF's Men Player of the year, an award for the best Southeast Asian player in the recent two years.

Quang Hải scored 3 goals in the 2022 FIFA World Cup qualification, which helped Vietnam to reach the final round of qualification for the first time in its history. In the first match of the third qualifying round against Saudi Arabia, it was Quang Hải who fired a long shot in the third minute to help Vietnam take a 1–0 lead; the team could not hold the lead and went on to lose 3-–1. Despite their best efforts, Vietnam accepted to be eliminated when they were at the bottom of the table with 4 points.

He scored 2 goals in the 2020 AFF Championship; even so, Vietnam was eliminated by Thailand in the semi-finals.

At the 2022 AFF Cup, Quang Hải seemed to have lost his form after a long time on the bench at Pau. In the two-legged final matches against Thailand, Vietnam tied 2-2 in the first game, a home game, but lost 1-0 in the second away match, leading to a 3-2 aggregate score that caused Vietnam to lose the final.

Quang Hải scored a goal at the 2023 AFC Asian Cup against Iraq in the final round of the group stage. That goal helped him become the first Vietnamese player to score in two AFC Asian Cup periods. However, Vietnam was eliminated right from the group stage of this tournament.

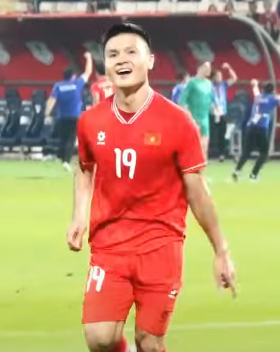
Quang Hai celebrates winning the 2024 ASEAN Championship with Vietnam national team

At the 2024 ASEAN Championship, Quang Hải scored the sole goal in the match against Indonesia to secure a 1–0 win. He scored his second goal of the championship in a win 5–0 against Myanmar. This helped Vietnam win the tournament for the third time in history after defeating Thailand in the final.

He was called for the 2026 ASEAN Championship, where he scored a goal against Timor-Leste on the opening match, helping Vietnam win 7–0. In the final group match against Cambodia, Quang Hải made his 84th international appearance, surpassing Lê Công Vinh as Vietnam's all-time most capped player. On 22 August, he scored the second goal as Vietnam defeated Thailand 2–0 at the first leg of the 2026 ASEAN Championship final at Rajamangala Stadium, before winning the title four days later at home, lifting the title as captain of the national team.

== Career statistics ==
=== Club ===
As of 20 November 2026

Club	Season	League			National cup (Note: Includes Vietnamese Cup, Coupe de France)		Continental		Other		Total	
Club	Season	Division	Apps	Goals	Apps	Goals	Apps	Goals	Apps	Goals	Apps	Goals
Công An Nhân Dân (loan)	2014	Second Division	4	0	–		–		1 (Note: Appearance in Second Division promotion play-offs)	0	5	0
Hà Nội (2011) (loan)	2015	V.League 2	13	4	0	0	–		–		13	4
Hà Nội	2014	V.League 1	0	0	–		–		–		0	0
Hà Nội	2016	V.League 1	25	3	7	1	2 (Note: Appearances in AFC Champions League / AFC Champions League Elite)	0	1 (Note: Appearances in Vietnamese Super Cup)	0	35	4
Hà Nội	2017	V.League 1	26	5	2	0	6 (Note: One appearance in AFC Champions League and five appearances in AFC Cup)	0	1	0	35	5
Hà Nội	2018	V.League 1	24	9	6	1	–		–		30	10
Hà Nội	2019	V.League 1	24	8	3	1	15 (Note: Two appearance in AFC Champions League and thirteen appearances in AFC Cup)	2	–		42	11
Hà Nội	2020	V.League 1	17	4	4	4	–		1	0	22	8
Hà Nội	2021	V.League 1	9	1	–		–		1	0	10	1
Hà Nội	2022	V.League 1	2	1	2	0	–		–		4	1
Hà Nội	Total		127	31	24	7	23	2	4	0	178	44
Pau	2022–23	Ligue 2	12	1	1	0	–		–		13	1
Pau B	2022–23	Championnat National 3	7	0	–		–		–		7	0
Công An Hà Nội	2023	V.League 1	8	1	1	0	–		–		9	1
Công An Hà Nội	2023–24	V.League 1	22	8	1	0	–		1	0	24	8
Công An Hà Nội	2024–25	V.League 1	25	3	4	1	–		9 (Note: Appearances in ASEAN Club Championship)	1	38	5
Công An Hà Nội	2025–26	V.League 1	24	3	1	0	6 (Note: Appearances in AFC Champions League Two)	2	4 (Note: One appearance in Vietnamese Super Cup; three appearances in ASEAN Club Championship)	0	35	5
Công An Hà Nội	2026–27	V.League 1	6	0	0	0	3	0	3 (Note: One appearance in Vietnamese Super Cup; two appearances in ASEAN Club Championship)	0	12	0
Công An Hà Nội	Total		85	15	7	1	9	2	17	1	119	19
Career total			248	51	32	8	32	4	22	1	335	64

=== International ===
As of match played 26 August 2026

Appearances and goals by national team and year
National team	Year	Apps	Goals
Vietnam	2017	3	1
Vietnam	2018	10	3
Vietnam	2019	12	2
Vietnam	2020	0	0
Vietnam	2021	14	4
Vietnam	2022	9	0
Vietnam	2023	9	0
Vietnam	2024	14	3
Vietnam	2025	6	1
Vietnam	2026	11	2
Total		88	16

Scores and results list Vietnam's goal tally first, score column indicates score after each Quang Hải goal.

List of international goals scored by Nguyễn Quang Hải
No.	Date	Venue	Opponent	Score	Result	Competition
1	5 September 2017	Phnom Penh Olympic Stadium, Phnom Penh, Cambodia	Cambodia	2–1	2–1	2019 AFC Asian Cup qualification
2	8 November 2018	New Laos National Stadium, Vientiane, Laos	Laos	3–0	3–0	2018 AFF Championship
3	24 November 2018	Hàng Đẫy Stadium, Hanoi, Vietnam	Cambodia	2–0	3–0	2018 AFF Championship
4	6 December 2018	Mỹ Đình National Stadium, Hanoi, Vietnam	Philippines	1–0	2–1	2018 AFF Championship
5	16 January 2019	Hazza bin Zayed Stadium, Al Ain, United Arab Emirates	Yemen	1–0	2–0	2019 AFC Asian Cup
6	10 October 2019	Mỹ Đình National Stadium, Hanoi, Vietnam	Malaysia	1–0	1–0	2022 FIFA World Cup qualification
7	7 June 2021	Al-Maktoum Stadium, Dubai, United Arab Emirates	Indonesia	2–0	4–0	2022 FIFA World Cup qualification
8	2 September 2021	Mrsool Park, Riyadh, Saudi Arabia	Saudi Arabia	1–0	1–3	2022 FIFA World Cup qualification
9	12 December 2021	Bishan Stadium, Bishan, Singapore	Malaysia	1–0	3–0	2020 AFF Championship
10	19 December 2021	Bishan Stadium, Bishan, Singapore	Cambodia	4–0	4–0	2020 AFF Championship
11	24 January 2024	Jassim bin Hamad Stadium, Al Rayyan, Qatar	Iraq	2–2	2–3	2023 AFC Asian Cup
12	15 December 2024	Việt Trì Stadium, Phú Thọ, Vietnam	Indonesia	1–0	1–0	2024 ASEAN Championship
13	21 December 2024	Việt Trì Stadium, Phú Thọ, Vietnam	Myanmar	3–0	5–0	2024 ASEAN Championship
14	25 March 2025	Gò Đậu Stadium, Thủ Dầu Một, Vietnam	Laos	5–0	5–0	2027 AFC Asian Cup qualification
15	24 July 2026	Chonburi Stadium, Chonburi, Thailand	Timor-Leste	7–0	7–0	2026 ASEAN Championship
16	22 August 2026	Rajamangala Stadium, Bangkok, Thailand	Thailand	2–0	2–0	2026 ASEAN Championship

== Honours ==
Hà Nội (2011)

- V.League 2: 2015

Hà Nội

- V.League 1: 2016, 2018, 2019
- Vietnamese National Cup: 2019, 2020
- Vietnamese Super Cup: 2018, 2019, 2020

Công An Hà Nội

- V.League 1: 2023, 2025–26
- Vietnamese National Cup: 2024–25
- Vietnamese Super Cup: 2025, 2026
- ASEAN Club Championship runner-up: 2024–25

Vietnam U19

- AFF U-19 Youth Championship runner-up: 2014, 2015
- Hassanal Bolkiah Trophy runner-up: 2014

Vietnam U23/Olympic

- AFC U-23 Asian Cup runners-up: 2018
- Asian Games fourth-place: 2018
- VFF Cup: 2018
- SEA Games gold medal: 2019

Vietnam

- ASEAN Championship: 2018, 2024, 2026; runners-up: 2022
- King's Cup runner-up: 2019
- VFF Cup: 2022

Individual

- AFF Championship Best XI: 2018
- AFF Championship Most Valuable Player: 2018
- Vietnamese Golden Ball: 2018
- Vietnamese Silver Ball: 2019, 2021
- Vietnamese Bronze Ball: 2017
- V.League 1 Best Young Player: 2017, 2018
- V.League 1 Player of the Season: 2019, 2025–26
- V.League 1 Team of the Season: 2017, 2018, 2019, 2020, 2024–25, 2025–26
- ASEAN Football Federation Best XI: 2019
- ASEAN Football Federation Men’s Player of the Year: 2019
- AFC Asian Cup Team of the Tournament: 2019
- V.League 1 Goal of the Year: 2020
- ASEAN Championship All-Star XI: 2020, 2024
- AFC Cup All-time XI
- ASEAN Club Championship All-Star XI: 2024–25

Orders

- Second-class Labor Order: 2018
- Third-class Labor Order: 2018, 2025
