= Best Footballer in Asia 2020 =

7th annual Best Footballer in Asia award

The Best Footballer in Asia 2020, recognizing the best male footballer in Asia in 2020, is the 8th edition of the Best Footballer in Asia, presented by Titan Sports. Son Heung-min won the award on 4 January 2021. It was his 4rd Best Footballer in Asia title in a row, and the 5th in the previous 6 years. The event was judged by a panel of 51 sports journalists. Son Heung-min received 45 1st-place votes and 4 2nd-place votes. With 35% of all points awarded, Son achieved the highest tally of Best Footballer in Asia in history at the time.

== Voting ==
51 judges were invited to vote, including 37 representatives from AFC nations/regions which comprise Afghanistan, Australia, Bahrain, Bangladesh, Cambodia, China, Chinese Taipei, Hong Kong, India, Indonesia, Iran, Iraq, Japan, Jordan, Korea Republic, Kuwait, Kyrgyzstan, Lebanon, Macao, Malaysia, Maldives, Myanmar, Oman, Pakistan, Palestine, Philippines, Qatar, Saudi Arabia, Singapore, Syria, Tajikistan, Thailand, Turkmenistan, United Arabic Emirates, Uzbekistan, Vietnam and Yemen. The other fourteen jurors were independent Asian football experts or from well-known football media outlets. Before voting, all judges were given a 24-player shortlist, but could choose other eligible players.

== Rules ==
Each juror selects 5 best footballers and awards them 6, 4, 3, 2 and 1 point respectively from their first choice to the fifth choice. A trophy for the Best Footballer in Asia is awarded to the player with the highest total of points.

=== Tiebreakers ===
When two or more candidates obtain the same points, the rankings of the concerned candidates would be based upon the following criteria in order:

- a) The number of 1st-place vote obtained
- b) The number of 2nd-place vote obtained
- c) The number of 3rd-place vote obtained
- d) The number of 4th-place vote obtained

If all conditions are equal, the concerned candidates tie.

If the concerned candidates are tied for first place, the award and the trophy are shared.

== Ranking ==
Rank	Name	Club(s)	Points
1	(South Korea) Son Heung-min	(England) Tottenham Hotspur	286
2	(Iran) Sardar Azmoun	(Russia) Zenit Saint Petersburg	89
3	(Brazil) Júnior Negrão	(South Korea) Ulsan Hyundai	83
4	(Spain) Andrés Iniesta	(Japan) Vissel Kobe	44
5	(South Korea) Yoon Bit-garam	(South Korea) Ulsan Hyundai	30
6	(Qatar) Akram Afif	(Qatar) Al-Sadd	29
7	(Japan) Takefusa Kubo	(Spain) Mallorca (Spain) Villarreal	25
7	(Brazil) Alex Teixeira	(China) Jiangsu Suning	25
9	(Iran) Mehdi Taremi	(Portugal) Rio Ave (Portugal) Porto	24
10	(South Korea) Hwang Hee-chan	(Austria) Red Bull Salzburg (Germany) RB Leipzig	22
11	(France) Bafétimbi Gomis	(Saudi Arabia) Al-Hilal	20
12	(Iraq) Bashar Resan	(Iran) Persepolis	19
13	(Morocco) Abderrazak Hamdallah	(Saudi Arabia) Al-Nassr	16
14	(South Korea) Won Du-jae	(South Korea) Ulsan Hyundai	16
15	(Japan) Daichi Kamada	(Germany) Eintracht Frankfurt	14
16	(Japan) Takehiro Tomiyasu	(Italy) Bologna	12
17	(Australia) Mathew Ryan	(England) Brighton & Hove Albion	11
18	(Australia) Mitch Langerak	(Japan) Nagoya Grampus	8
19	(Kenya) Michael Olunga	(Japan) Kashiwa Reysol	7
20	(Japan) Wataru Endo	(Germany) VfB Stuttgart	7
21	(Iran) Hossein Kanaanizadegan	(Iran) Persepolis	6
22	(South Korea) Lee Kang-in	(Spain) Valencia	4
22	(Uzbekistan) Jaloliddin Masharipov	(Uzbekistan) Pakhtakor	4
24	(Japan) Takumi Minamino	(England) Liverpool	4
25	(Iran) Alireza Beiranvand	(Iran) Persepolis (Belgium) Antwerp	3
25	(Iran) Shoja Khalilzadeh	(Iran) Persepolis (Qatar) Al-Rayyan	3
27	(Syria) Omar Al-Somah	(Saudi Arabia) Al-Ahli	2
28	(Brazil) Hulk	(China) Shanghai SIPG	1
28	(South Korea) Kim Tae-hwan	(South Korea) Ulsan Hyundai	1
28	(Japan) Kaoru Mitoma	(Japan) Kawasaki Frontale	1
