= Best Footballer in Asia 2021 =

9th annual Best Footballer in Asia award

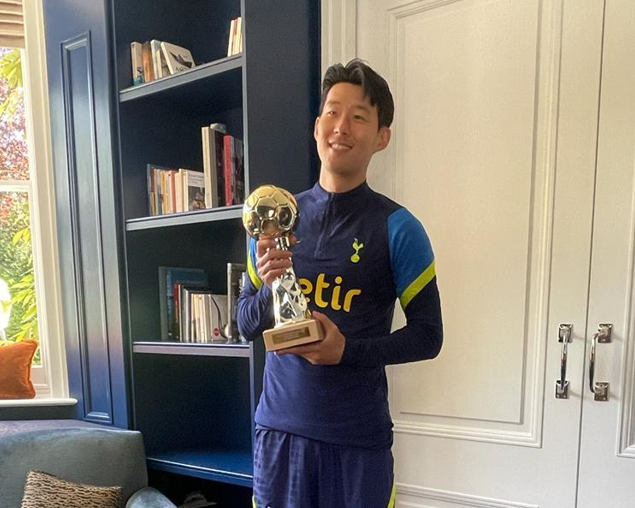
Son Heung-min was conferred the Best Footballer in Asia trophy in the training center of Tottenham Hotspur on May 18, 2022

The Best Footballer in Asia 2021, recognizing the best male footballer in Asia in 2021, is the 9th edition of the Best Footballer in Asia. Son Heung-min claimed the award on 3 January 2022. It was his 5st Best Footballer in Asia title in a row, and the 7th title overall. The event was judged by a panel of 50 sports journalists.

== Voting ==
50 judges were invited to vote, including 37 representatives from AFC nations/regions which comprise Australia, Bahrain, Bangladesh, Cambodia, China, Chinese Taipei, Hong Kong, India, Indonesia, Iran, Iraq, Japan, Jordan, Korea Republic, Kuwait, Kyrgyzstan, Lebanon, Macao, Malaysia, Mongolia, Nepal, Oman, Pakistan, Palestine, Philippines, Qatar, Saudi Arabia, Singapore, Sri Lanka, Syria, Tajikistan, Thailand, Turkmenistan, United Arabic Emirates, Uzbekistan, Vietnam and Yemen. The other thirteen jurors were independent Asian football experts or from high-profile media outlets. Before voting, all judges were given a 25-player shortlist, but could choose other eligible players.

== Rules ==
Each juror selects 5 best footballers and awards them 6, 4, 3, 2 and 1 point respectively from their first choice to the fifth choice. A trophy for the Best Footballer in Asia is awarded to the player with the highest total of points.

=== Tiebreakers ===
When two or more candidates obtain the same points, the rankings of the concerned candidates would be based upon the following criteria in order:

- a) The number of 1st-place vote obtained
- b) The number of 2nd-place vote obtained
- c) The number of 3rd-place vote obtained
- d) The number of 4th-place vote obtained

If all conditions are equal, the concerned candidates tie.

If the concerned candidates are tied for first place, the award and the trophy are shared.

== Ranking ==
Rank	Name	Club(s)	Points
1	(South Korea) Son Heung-min	(England) Tottenham Hotspur	242
2	(Iran) Sardar Azmoun	(Russia) Zenit Saint Petersburg	111
3	(Iran) Mehdi Taremi	(Portugal) Porto	90
4	(Saudi Arabia) Salem Al-Dawsari	(Saudi Arabia) Al-Hilal	74
5	(Japan) Takehiro Tomiyasu	(England) Arsenal	50
6	(Japan) Kyogo Furuhashi	(Scotland) Celtic	36
7	(Qatar) Akram Afif	(Qatar) Al-Sadd	23
8	(Saudi Arabia) Salman Al-Faraj	(Saudi Arabia) Al-Hilal	19
9	(South Korea) Hwang Hee-chan	(Germany) RB Leipzig (England) Wolverhampton Wanderers	19
10	(Uzbekistan) Eldor Shomurodov	(Italy) Genoa (Italy) Roma	18
11	(Japan) Takefusa Kubo	(Spain) Getafe (Spain) Mallorca	16
12	(Brazil) Leandro Damião	(Japan) Kawasaki Frontale	13
13	(France) Bafétimbi Gomis	(Saudi Arabia) Al-Hilal	13
14	(Kenya) Michael Olunga	(Qatar) Al-Duhail	12
15	(Japan) Wataru Endo	(Germany) VfB Stuttgart	11
16	(Qatar) Almoez Ali	(Qatar) Al-Duhail	10
17	(United Arab Emirates) Ali Mabkhout	(United Arab Emirates) Al Jazira	9
18	(Iran) Alireza Jahanbakhsh	(England) Brighton & Hove Albion (Netherlands) Feyenoord	5
19	(Japan) Takumi Minamino	(England) Liverpool	4
20	(Australia) Martin Boyle	(Scotland) Hibernian	3
20	(Spain) Andres Iniesta	(Japan) Vissel Kobe	3
22	(Brazil) Igor Coronado	(United Arab Emirates) Sharjah (Saudi Arabia) Al-Ittihad	2
22	(Japan) Junya Ito	(Belgium) Genk	2
22	(Iran) Amir Abedzadeh	(Portugal) Maritimo (Spain) Ponferradina	2
22	(South Korea) Jang Hyun-soo	(Saudi Arabia) Al-Hilal	2
22	(Brazil) Oscar	(China) Shanghai Port	2
22	(Vietnam) Nguyen Tien Linh	(Vietnam) Becamex Binh Duong	2
28	(Thailand) Theerathon Bunmathan	(Japan) Yokohama F. Marinos	1
28	(South Korea) Hwang In-beom	(Russia) Rubin Kazan	1
28	(India) Sunil Chhetri	(India) Bengaluru	1
28	(Montenegro) Dejan Damjanovic	(Hong Kong) Kitchee	1
28	(Uzbekistan) Jaloliddin Masharipov	(Saudi Arabia) Al-Nassr	1
28	(Thailand) Chanathip Songkrasin	(Japan) Hokkaido Consadole Sapporo	1
28	(China) Wu Lei	(Spain) Espanyol	1
