= Best Footballer in Asia 2025 =

13th annual Best Footballer in Asia award

The Best Footballer in Asia 2025, recognizing the best male footballer in Asia in 2025, was the 13th edition of the Best Footballer in Asia. Son Heung-min claimed the award on 13 October 2025. It was the tenth time that the Best Footballer in Asia was awarded the South Korean player. The event was judged by a panel of sixty-four sports journalists. Akram Afif received 14 first-place votes, 9 second-place votes, 5 third-place votes, 4 fourth-place votes, 3 fifth-place votes and finished on 146 points in total.

== Voting ==
64 judges were invited to vote, including 42 representatives from AFC nations/regions which comprise Afghanistan, Australia, Bahrain, Bangladesh, Cambodia, China, Chinese Taipei, Guam，Hong Kong, India, Indonesia, Iran, Iraq, Japan, Jordan, Laos，Korea Republic, Kuwait, Kyrgyzstan, Lebanon, Macao, Malaysia, Maldives, Mongolia, Myanmar, Nepal, Oman, Pakistan, Palestine, Philippines, Qatar, Saudi Arabia, Singapore, Sri Lanka, Syria, Tajikistan, Thailand, Turkmenistan, United Arabic Emirates, Uzbekistan, Vietnam and Yemen. The other twenty jurors were independent Asian football experts or from high-profile media outlets. Before voting, all judges were given a 25-player shortlist, but could choose other eligible players.

== Ranking ==
The votes were based on the results from 16 August, 2024 to July 16, 2025

Rank	Player	Club(s)	Points
1	(South Korea) Son Heung-min	(England) Tottenham Hotspur	146
2	(South Korea) Lee Kang-in	(France) Paris Saint-Germain	105
3	(Portugal) Cristiano Ronaldo	(Saudi Arabia) Al Nassr	91
4	(Algeria) Riyad Mahrez	(Saudi Arabia) Al Ahli	75
5	(France) Karim Benzema	(Saudi Arabia) Al Ittihad	73
6	(Saudi Arabia) Salem Al-Dawsari	(Saudi Arabia) Al Hilal	72
7	(Japan) Kaoru Mitoma	(England) Brighton & Hove Albion	72
8	(Qatar) Akram Afif	(Qatar) Al-Sadd	34
9	(Uzbekistan) Abdukodir Khusanov	(France) Lens (England) Manchester City	32
10	(Uzbekistan) Abbosbek Fayzullaev	(Russia) CSKA Moscow	32
11	(South Korea) Kim Min-jae	(Germany) Bayern Munich	32
12	(Japan) Wataru Endo	(England) Liverpool	28
13	(England) Ivan Toney	(Saudi Arabia) Al Ahli	28
14	(Japan) Takefusa Kubo	(Spain) Real Sociedad	27
15	(Jordan) Musa Al-Taamari	(France) Montpellier	25
16	(Iran) Mehdi Taremi	(Italy) Inter Milan	21
17	(Palestine) Wessam Abou Ali	(Egypt) Al Ahly	20
18	(Brazil) Marcos Leonardo	(Saudi Arabia) Al Hilal	17
19	(Japan) Daichi Kamada	(England) Crystal Palace	15
20	(Japan) Ritsu Doan	(Germany) SC Freiburg	14
21	(Iran) Sardar Azmoun	(United Arab Emirates) Shabab Al Ahli	12
22	(South Korea) Lee Jae-sung	(Germany) Mainz 05	10
23	(Japan) Daizen Maeda	(Scotland) Celtic	9
24	(Morocco) Yassine Bounou	(Saudi Arabia) Al Hilal	7
25	(Iran) Mohammad Mohebi	(Russia) Rostov	4
25	(Morocco) Soufiane Rahimi	(United Arab Emirates) Al Ain	4
27	(Brazil) Roberto Firmino	(Saudi Arabia) Al Ahli	4
28	(Japan) Ayase Ueda	(Netherlands) Feyenoord	3
28	(Serbia) Sergej Milinković-Savić	(Saudi Arabia) Al Hilal	3
30	(Australia) Jackson Irvine	(Germany) St. Pauli	3
31	(Brazil) Galeno	(Saudi Arabia) Al-Ahli	2
32	(Indonesia) Jay Idzes	(Italy) Venezia	1
32	(Senegal) Kalidou Koulibaly	(Saudi Arabia) Al Hilal	1
32	(Brazil) Rafael Elias	(Japan) Kyoto Sanga	1
32	(Japan) Gotoku Sakai	(Japan) Vissel Kobe	1
