= Best Footballer in Asia 2022 =

10th annual Best Footballer in Asia award

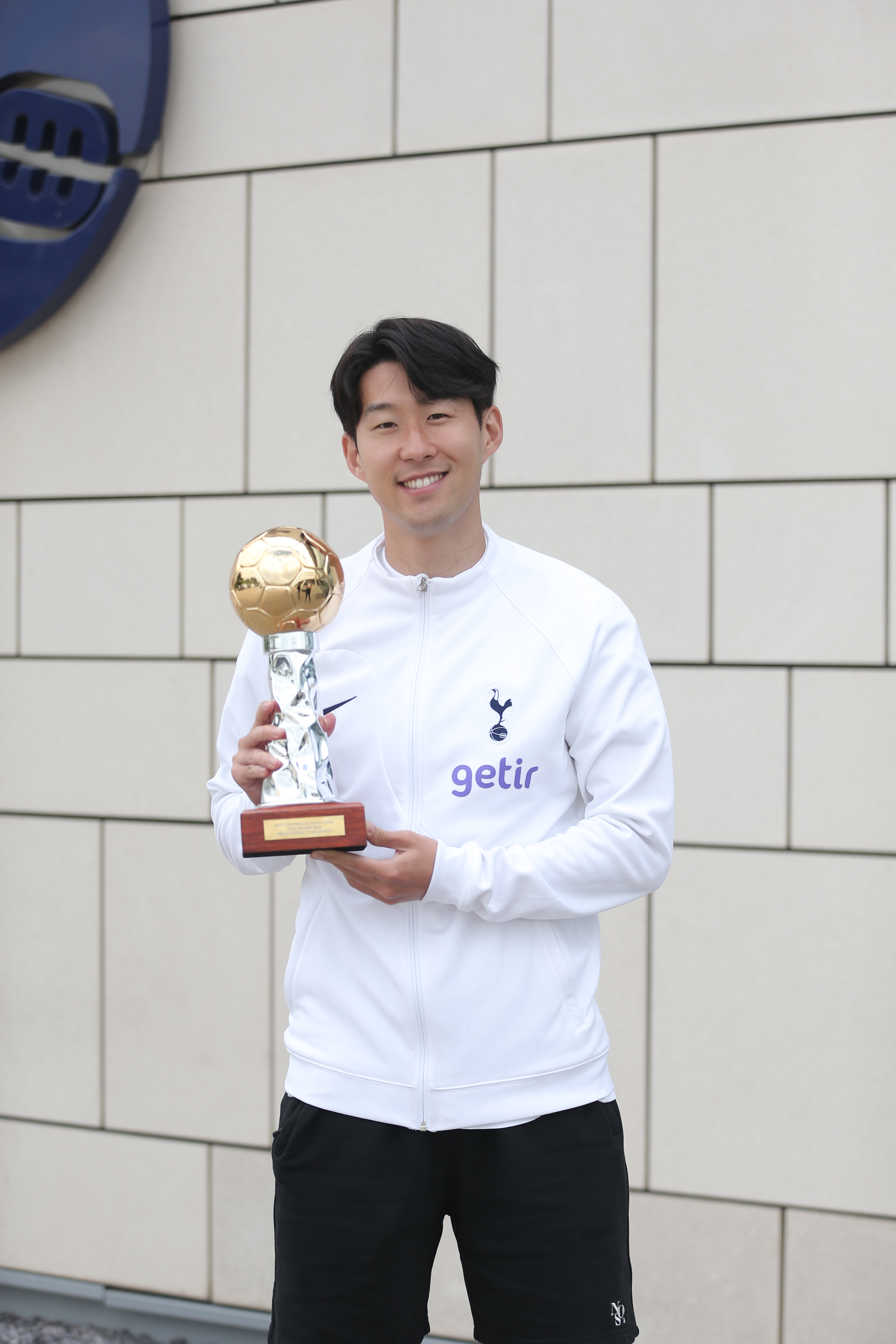
Son Heung-min was conferred the Best Footballer in Asia 2022 trophy and his eighth in the training center of Tottenham Hotspur on May 25, 2023

The Best Footballer in Asia 2022, recognizing the best male footballer in Asia in 2022, was the 10th edition of the Best Footballer in Asia. Son Heung-min claimed the award on 6 February 2023. It was his sixth Best Footballer in Asia title in a row, and eighth title overall. The event was judged by a panel of sixty sports journalists. Son received thirty first-place votes, fifteen second-place votes, two third-place votes, four fourth-place votes, five fifth-place votes and finished on 256 points in total.

== Voting ==
60 judges were invited to vote, including 40 representatives from AFC nations/regions which comprise Afghanistan, Australia, Bahrain, Bangladesh, Cambodia, China, Chinese Taipei, Hong Kong, India, Indonesia, Iran, Iraq, Japan, Jordan, Korea Republic, Kuwait, Kyrgyzstan, Lebanon, Macao, Malaysia, Maldives, Mongolia, Myanmar, Nepal, Oman, Pakistan, Palestine, Philippines, Qatar, Saudi Arabia, Singapore, Sri Lanka, Syria, Tajikistan, Thailand, Turkmenistan, United Arabic Emirates, Uzbekistan, Vietnam and Yemen. The other twenty jurors were independent Asian football experts or from high-profile media outlets. Before voting, all judges were given a 25-player shortlist, but could choose other eligible players.

== Rules ==
Each juror selected their five best footballers and awarded them five , four, three, two and one point respectively from their first choice to the fifth choice. A trophy for the Best Footballer in Asia was awarded to the player with the highest total of points.

=== Tiebreakers ===
When two or more candidates obtained the same points, the rankings of the concerned candidates was based upon the following criteria in order:

- a) The number of first-place vote obtained
- b) The number of second-place vote obtained
- c) The number of third-place vote obtained
- d) The number of fourth-place vote obtained

If all conditions were equal, the concerned candidates tied.

If the concerned candidates were tied for first place, the award and the trophy were shared.

== Ranking ==
Rank	Player	Club(s)	Points
1	(South Korea) Son Heung-min	(England) Tottenham Hotspur	256
2	(Iran) Mehdi Taremi	(Portugal) Porto	120
3	(Saudi Arabia) Salem Al-Dawsari	(Saudi Arabia) Al-Hilal	112
4	(South Korea) Kim Min-jae	(Turkey) Fenerbahçe (Italy) Napoli	99
5	(Japan) Kaoru Mitoma	(Belgium) Union Saint-Gilloise (England) Brighton & Hove Albion	91
6	(Japan) Daichi Kamada	(Germany) Eintracht Frankfurt	68
7	(Japan) Ritsu Dōan	(Netherlands) PSV Eindhoven (Germany) SC Freiburg	47
8	(Japan) Takehiro Tomiyasu	(England) Arsenal	37
9	(Thailand) Theerathon Bunmathan	(Thailand) Buriram United	21
10	(Japan) Wataru Endo	(Germany) VfB Stuttgart	18
11	(Japan) Kyogo Furuhashi	(Scotland) Celtic	14
12	(Saudi Arabia) Mohamed Kanno	(Saudi Arabia) Al-Hilal	12
13	(Kenya) Michael Olunga	(Qatar) Al-Duhail	6
14	(Uzbekistan) Eldor Shomurodov	(Italy) Roma	6
15	(South Korea) Cho Gue-sung	(South Korea) Gimcheon Sangmu (South Korea) Jeonbuk Hyundai	6
16	(Australia) Matthew Leckie	(Australia) Melbourne City	5
17	(Iran) Saeid Ezatolahi	(Qatar) Al-Garafa (Denmark) Vejle	4
17	(Singapore) Ikhsan Fandi	(Thailand) BG Pathum United	4
17	(Australia) Craig Goodwin	(Australia) Adelaide United	4
17	(South Korea) Jung Woo-Young	(Qatar) Al-Sadd	4
17	(Australia) Jamie Maclaren	(Australia) Melbourne City	4
22	(Nigeria) Odion Ighalo	(Saudi Arabia) Al-Hilal	4
23	(Iran) Sardar Azmoun	(Germany) Bayer Leverkusen	3
24	(Saudi Arabia) Saud Abdulhamid	(Saudi Arabia) Al-Hilal	3
24	(South Korea) Kim Young-gwon	(South Korea) Ulsan Hyundai	3
26	(Japan) Reo Hatate	(Scotland) Celtic	2
26	(Japan) Maya Yoshida	(Italy) Sampdoria (Germany) Schalke 04	2
28	(Japan) Daizen Maeda	(Scotland) Celtic	2
29	(Vietnam) Nguyen Tien Linh	(Vietnam) Becamex Binh Duong	1
29	(Japan) Akihiro Ienaga	(Japan) Kawasaki Frontale	1
29	(Saudi Arabia) Mohammed Al-Owais	(Saudi Arabia) Al-Hilal	1
