= Best Footballer in Asia 2018 =

6th annual Best Footballer in Asia award

The Best Footballer in Asia award recognizes the best male footballer in Asia. Son Heung-min received the 6th annual award on 4 January 2019 for his play during the 2018 season. The event was judged by a panel of 44 sports journalists, and Son Heung-min won four of the six awards presented.

== Voting ==
44 judges were invited to vote, including 35 representatives from AFC nations/regions which comprise Afghanistan, Australia, Bahrain, Bangladesh, Cambodia, China, Chinese Taipei, Hong Kong, India, Indonesia, Iran, Iraq, Japan, Jordan, Korea Republic, Kuwait, Kyrgyzstan, Lebanon, Macao, Malaysia, Myanmar, Oman, Palestine, Philippines, Qatar, Saudi Arabia, Singapore, Syria, Tajikistan, Thailand, Turkmenistan, United Arab Emirates, Uzbekistan, Vietnam and Yemen. The other nine jurors were independent Asian football experts or from well-known football media outlets. Before voting, all judges were given a 24-player shortlist, but could choose other eligible players.

== Rules ==
Each juror selects 5 best footballers and awards them 6, 4, 3, 2 and 1 point respectively from their first choice to the fifth choice. A trophy for the Best Footballer in Asia is awarded to the player with the highest total of points.

=== Tiebreakers ===
When two or more candidates obtain the same points, the rankings of the concerned candidates would be based upon the following criteria in order:

- a) The number of 1st-place vote obtained
- b) The number of 2nd-place vote obtained
- c) The number of 3rd-place vote obtained
- d) The number of 4th-place vote obtained

If all conditions are equal, the concerned candidates tie.

If the concerned candidates are tied for first place, the award and the trophy are shared.

== Ranking ==
Rank	Name	Club(s)	Points
1	(South Korea) Son Heung-min	(England) Tottenham Hotspur	206
2	(Japan) Makoto Hasebe	(Germany) Eintracht Frankfurt	64
3	(Iran) Alireza Beiranvand	(Iran) Persepolis	50
4	(Japan) Yuma Suzuki	(Japan) Kashima Antlers	46
5	(Algeria) Baghdad Bounedjah	(Qatar) Al-Sadd	31
6	(China) Wu Lei	(China) Shanghai SIPG	28
7	(Iran) Alireza Jahanbakhsh	(Netherlands) AZ (England) Brighton & Hove Albion	28
8	(Philippines) Neil Etheridge	(Wales) Cardiff City	26
9	(Japan) Takashi Inui	(Spain) Eibar (Spain) Real Betis	26
10	(Qatar) Abdelkarim Hassan	(Qatar) Al-Sadd	24
11	(Japan) Yuya Osako	(Germany) 1. FC Köln (Germany) Werder Bremen	20
12	(Australia) Aaron Mooy	(England) Huddersfield Town	19
13	(Australia) Mathew Ryan	(England) Brighton & Hove Albion	16
14	(Saudi Arabia) Salman Al-Faraj	(Saudi Arabia) Al-Hilal	15
15	(Vietnam) Nguyễn Quang Hải	(Vietnam) Hanoi	13
16	(Qatar) Akram Afif	(Qatar) Al-Sadd	12
17	(South Korea) Kwoun Sun-tae	(Japan) Kashima Antlers	11
19	(Sweden) Marcus Berg	(United Arab Emirates) Al-Ain	9
18	(South Korea) Hwang Ui-jo	(Japan) Gamba Osaka	9
20	(Japan) Gen Shoji	(Japan) Kashima Antlers	8
21	(India) Sunil Chhetri	(India) Bengaluru	7
21	(South Korea) Jo Hyeon-woo	(South Korea) Daegu	7
23	(Kyrgyzstan) Valery Kichin	(Russia) Yenisey Krasnoyarsk	4
24	(Brazil) Caio	(United Arab Emirates) Al-Ain	3
24	(Syria) Omar Kharbin	(Saudi Arabia) Al-Hilal	3
24	(Brazil) Paulinho	(Spain) Barcelona (China) Guangzhou Evergrande	3
24	(Thailand) Chanathip Songkrasin	(Japan) Consadole Sapporo	3
28	(Uzbekistan) Odil Ahmedov	(China) Shanghai SIPG	2
28	(Iran) Sardar Azmoun	(Russia) Rubin Kazan	2
28	(Japan) Shinji Kagawa	(Germany) Borussia Dortmund	2
28	(Japan) Kengo Nakamura	(Japan) Kawasaki Frontale	2
32	(Brazil) Serginho	(Brazil) América Mineiro (Japan) Kashima Antlers	2
33	(Turkmenistan) Altymyrat Annadurdyyev	(Turkmenistan) Altyn Asyr	1
33	(Spain) Andrés Iniesta	(Spain) Barcelona (Japan) Vissel Kobe	1
33	(Japan) Daigo Nishi	(Japan) Kashima Antlers	1
