= Best Footballer in Asia 2013 =

1st annual Best Footballer in Asia award

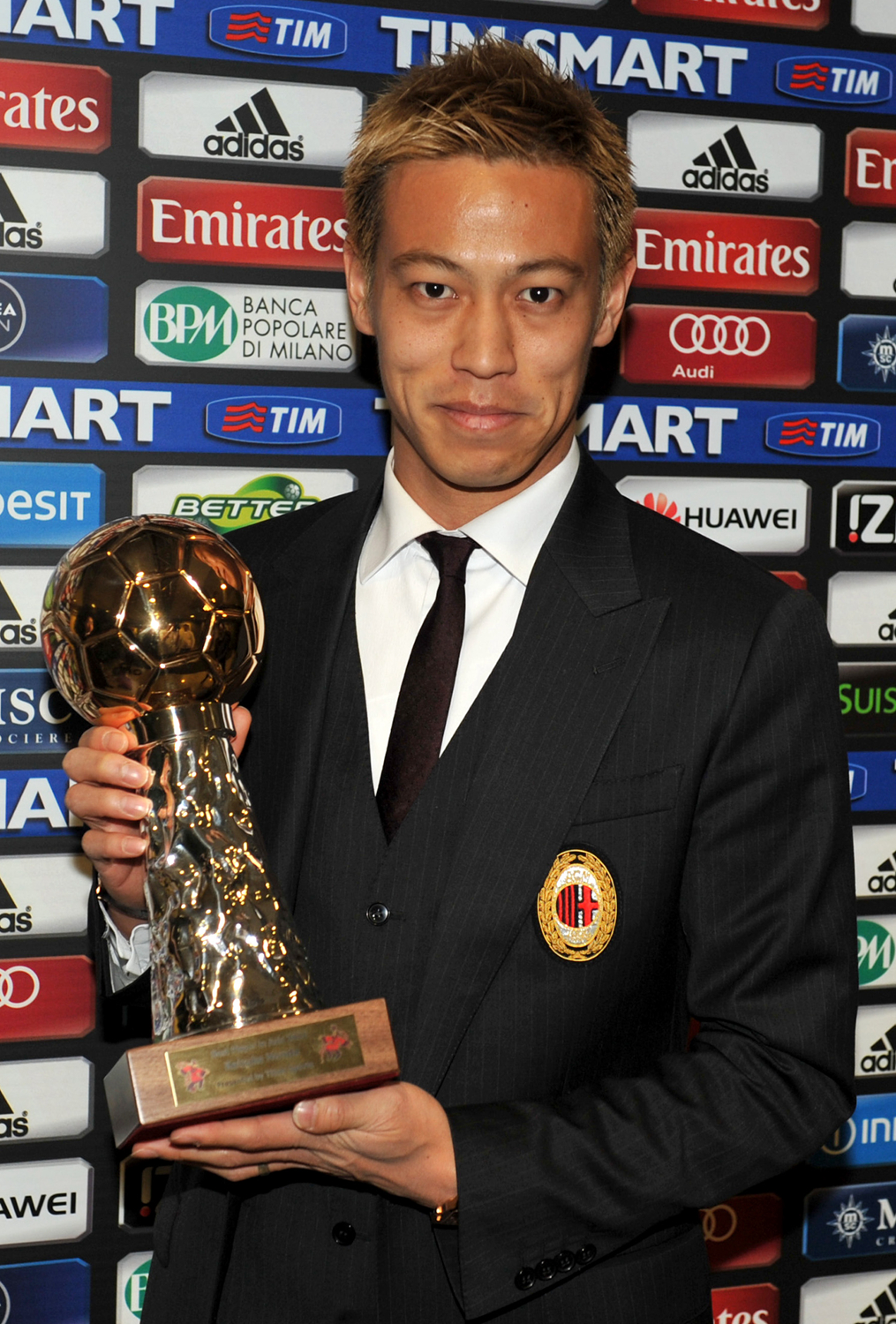
As the inaugural winner, Keisuke Honda held the Best Footballer in Asia trophy in the conference hall of the San Siro stadium on March 16th, 2014

The Best Footballer in Asia 2013 was the inaugural Best Footballer in Asia. Based upon the voting of a panel of 22 journalists the winner was Keisuke Honda. On March 16, 2014, the trophy was conferred to Keisuke Honda by Luo Ming, the deputy chief editor of Titan Sports in San Siro stadium.

== Voting ==
The panel was constituted by 18 journalists from AFC nations/regions including Australia, Bangladesh, Hong Kong, India, Indonesia, Japan, Jordan, Kuwait, Macao, Qatar, Palestine Saudi Arabia, Tajikistan, Thailand, Turkmenistan, United Arabic Emirates, Uzbekistan, Vietnam and 4 journalists from England, France, Germany and Italy representing non-AFC media outlets.

== Rankings ==
Rank	Name	Club	Points
1	(Japan) Keisuke Honda	(Russia) CSKA Moscow	46
2	(Brazil) Elkeson	(China) Guangzhou Evergrande	32
3	(Argentina) Darío Conca	(China) Guangzhou Evergrande	32
4	(China) Zheng Zhi	(China) Guangzhou Evergrande	31
5	(South Korea) Son Heung-min	(Germany) Bayer Leverkusen	31
6	(Brazil) Muriqui	(China) Guangzhou Evergrande	27
7	(Iran) Javad Nekounam	(Iran) Esteghlal	25
8	(Japan) Yuto Nagatomo	(Italy) Internazionale	23
9	(Japan) Shinji Kagawa	(England) Manchester United	11
10	(Australia) Robbie Kruse	(Germany) Fortuna Düsseldorf / (Germany) Bayer Leverkusen	11
11	(South Korea) Ha Dae-Sung	(South Korea) FC Seoul	8
12	(Montenegro) Dejan Damjanović	(South Korea) FC Seoul	8
13	(Japan) Shinji Okazaki	(Germany) VfB Stuttgart / (Germany) Mainz 05	7
14	(Japan) Maya Yoshida	(England) Southampton	6
15	(Japan) Atsuto Uchida	(Germany) Schalke 04	5
16	(Japan) Hisato Satō	(Japan) Sanfrecce Hiroshima	5
17	(Japan) Yoichiro Kakitani	(Japan) Cerezo Osaka	3
18	(Brazil) Rogerinho	Al-Kuwait	3
19	(Japan) Hiroshi Kiyotake	(Germany) 1. FC Nürnberg	2
19	(Jordan) Saeed Murjan	(Jordan) Al-Arabi / (Kuwait) Kazma	2
19	(Japan) Yoshito Ōkubo	(Japan) Kawasaki Frontale	2
19	(Japan) Yuya Osako	(Japan) Kashima Antlers	2
19	(South Korea) Park Chu-young	(Spain) Celta de Vigo/ (England) Arsenal	2
19	(China) Zeng Cheng	(China) Guangzhou Evergrande	2
25	(Jordan) Ahmad Hayel	(Kuwait) Al-Arabi	1
25	(Japan) Shunsuke Nakamura	(Japan) Yokohama F. Marinos	1
25	(India) Lalrindika Ralte	(India) East Bengal	1
