= Best Footballer in Asia 2015 =

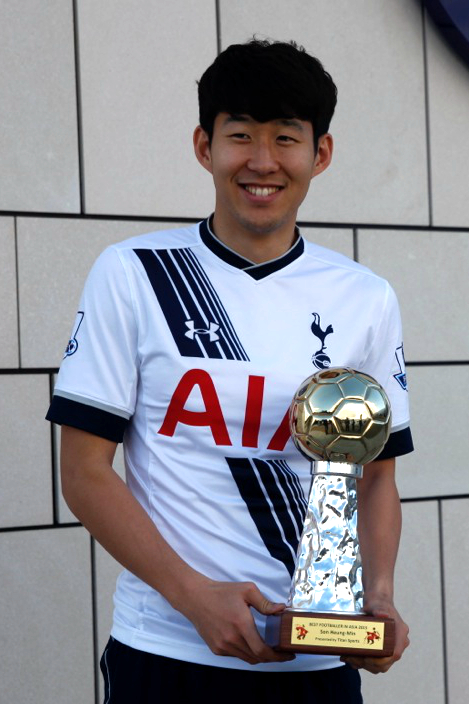
Son Heung-min was the first player to win Best Footballer in Asia more than one time.

The 2015 Best Footballer in Asia, given to the best football player in Asia as judged by a panel of 20 sports journalists, was awarded to Son Heung-min on 28 December 2015. Son became the first player to win the award on multiple occasions, and the first player to win the award consecutively.

== Voting ==
The panel of jurors was constituted by 20 journalists. 16 journalists represent AFC countries/regions including Australia, China, Hong Kong, Japan, Korea Republic, Macao, Palestine, Qatar, Saudi Arabia, Tajikistan, Thailand, Turkmenistan, United Arabic Emirates, Uzbekistan, Vietnam and 4 journalists represent media outlets of non- AFC countries/regions including England, France, Germany and Italy.

== Rules ==
Each juror selects 5 best footballers and awards them 5, 4, 3, 2 points and 1 point respectively from their first choice to the fifth choice. The trophy of the Best Footballer in Asia is awarded to the player with the highest total of points.

== Ranking ==
| Rank | Name | Club(s) | Points |
|---|---|---|---|
| 1 | (South Korea) Son Heung-min | (Germany) Bayer Leverkusen (England) Tottenham Hotspur | 49 |
| 2 | (China) Zheng Zhi | (China) Guangzhou Evergrande | 32 |
| 3 | (Brazil) Ricardo Goulart | (China) Guangzhou Evergrande | 32 |
| 4 | (United Arab Emirates) Ahmed Khalil | (United Arab Emirates) Al-Ahli | 28 |
| 5 | (United Arab Emirates) Omar Abdulrahman | (United Arab Emirates) Al-Ain | 27 |
| 6 | (Australia) Massimo Luongo | (England) Swindon Town (England) Queens Park Rangers | 25 |
| 7 | (Japan) Shinji Kagawa | (Germany) Borussia Dortmund | 22 |
| 8 | (South Korea) Ki Sung-yueng | (Wales) Swansea City | 15 |
| 9 | (Brazil) Paulinho | (England) Tottenham Hotspur (China) Guangzhou Evergrande | 12 |
| 10 | (Saudi Arabia) Mohammad Al-Sahlawi | (Saudi Arabia) Al-Nassr | 10 |
| 11 | (Uzbekistan) Eldor Shomurodov | (Uzbekistan) Bunyodkor | 9 |
| 12 | (Japan) Masaaki Higashiguchi | (Japan) Gamba Osaka | 6 |
| 13 | (China) Huang Bowen | (China) Guangzhou Evergrande | 5 |
| 13 | (Iran) Andranik Teymourian | (Iran) Tractor Sazi (Qatar) Umm Salal | 5 |
| 15 | (Uzbekistan) Odil Ahmedov | (Russia) Krasnodar | 4 |
| 15 | (Japan) Yoshinori Muto | (Japan) FC Tokyo (Germany) Mainz 05 | 4 |
| 17 | (Thailand) Theerathon Bunmathan | (Thailand) Buriram United | 3 |
| 17 | (Malaysia) Mohd Safiq Rahim | (Malaysia) Johor Darul Ta'zim | 3 |
| 17 | (China) Zhang Linpeng | (China) Guangzhou Evergrande | 3 |
| 20 | (Australia) Aaron Mooy | (Australia) Melbourne City | 2 |
| 21 | (Turkmenistan) Artur Gevorkyan | (Uzbekistan) Nasaf | 1 |
| 21 | (South Korea) Kim Young-gwon | (China) Guangzhou Evergrande | 1 |
| 21 | (Brazil) Lima | (United Arab Emirates) Al-Ahli | 1 |
| 21 | (Japan) Takashi Usami | (Japan) Gamba Osaka | 1 |
