= Best Footballer in Asia 2014 =

2014 football award

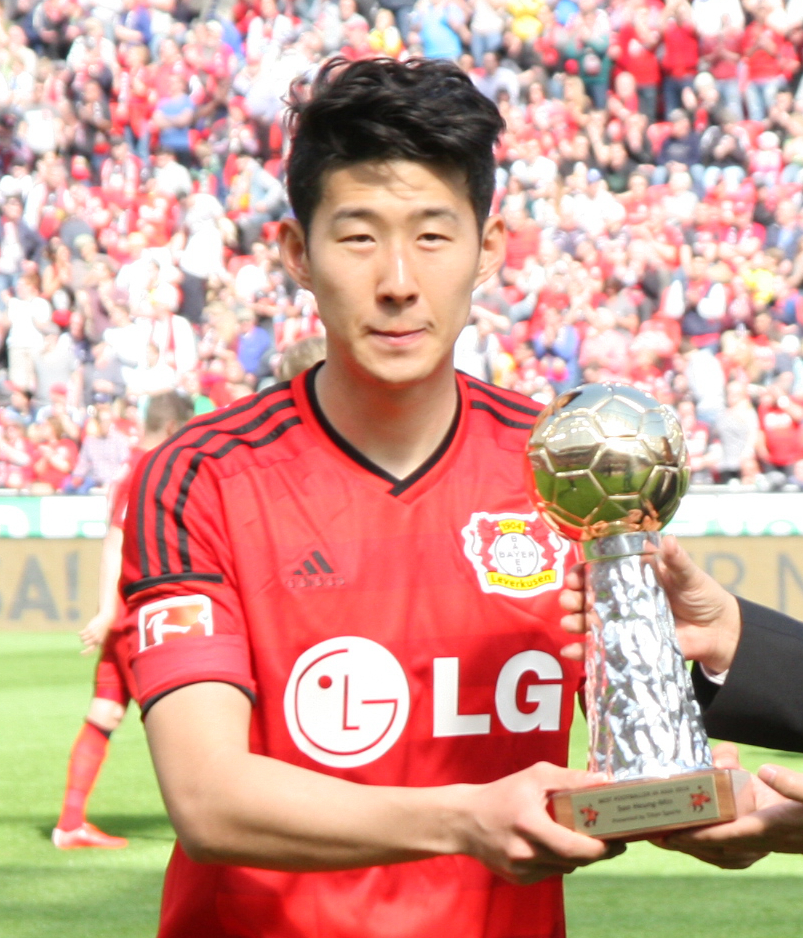
Son Heung-min was conferred the trophy at the BayArena in March 2015

The 2014 Best Footballer in Asia, given to the best football player in Asia as judged by a panel of sports journalists, was awarded to Son Heung-min on 28 November 2014.

== Voting ==
The panel of jurors was constituted by 24 journalists. 20 journalists represent AFC countries/regions including Australia, Bahrain, Bangladesh, China, Hong Kong, India, Japan, Korea Republic, Kuwait, Macao, Malaysia, Palestine, Qatar, Saudi Arabia, Tajikistan, Thailand, Turkmenistan, United Arabic Emirates, Uzbekistan, Vietnam and 4 journalists represent media outlets of non- AFC countries/regions including England, France, Germany and Italy.

== Ranking ==
Rank	Name	Club(s)	Points
1	(South Korea) Son Heung-min	(Germany) Bayer Leverkusen	74
2	(Japan) Keisuke Honda	(Italy) Milan	56
3	(Australia) Ante Covic	(Australia) Western Sydney Wanderers	37
4	(Australia) Tim Cahill	(United States) New York Red Bulls	35
5	(Saudi Arabia) Nasser Al-Shamrani	(Saudi Arabia) Al-Hilal	27
6	(Ghana) Asamoah Gyan	(United Arab Emirates) Al-Ain	25
7	(Japan) Shinji Okazaki	(Germany) Mainz 05	18
8	(South Korea) Ki Sung-yueng	(England) Sunderland (Wales) Swansea City	18
9	(Iran) Reza Ghoochannejhad	(England) Charlton Athletic; Kuwait SC	16
10	(Australia) Tomi Juric	(Australia) Western Sydney Wanderers	13
11	(Kuwait) Saif Al Hashan	(Kuwait) Qadsia	9
12	(South Korea) Koo Ja-cheol	(Germany) Mainz 05	3
12	(Japan) Yoshinori Muto	(Japan) FC Tokyo	3
14	(Iraq) Ali Adnan	(Turkey) Çaykur Rizespor	2
14	(Uzbekistan) Vitaliy Denisov	(Russia) Lokomotiv Moscow	2
14	(Qatar) Khalfan Ibrahim	(Qatar) Al-Sadd	2
14	(South Korea) Lee Keun-ho	(South Korea) Sangju Sangmu (Qatar) El Jaish	2
14	(Palestine) Ashraf Nu'man	(Palestine) Taraji Wadi Al-Nes (Saudi Arabia) Al-Faisaly	2
19	(United Arab Emirates) Ismail Ahmed	(Qatar) Al-Ain	1
19	(Spain) Juan Belencoso	(Hong Kong) Kitchee	1
19	(Iran) Ashkan Dejagah	(England) Fulham (Qatar) Al-Arabi	1
