= Nguyễn Tiến Linh =

Vietnamese footballer (born 1997)

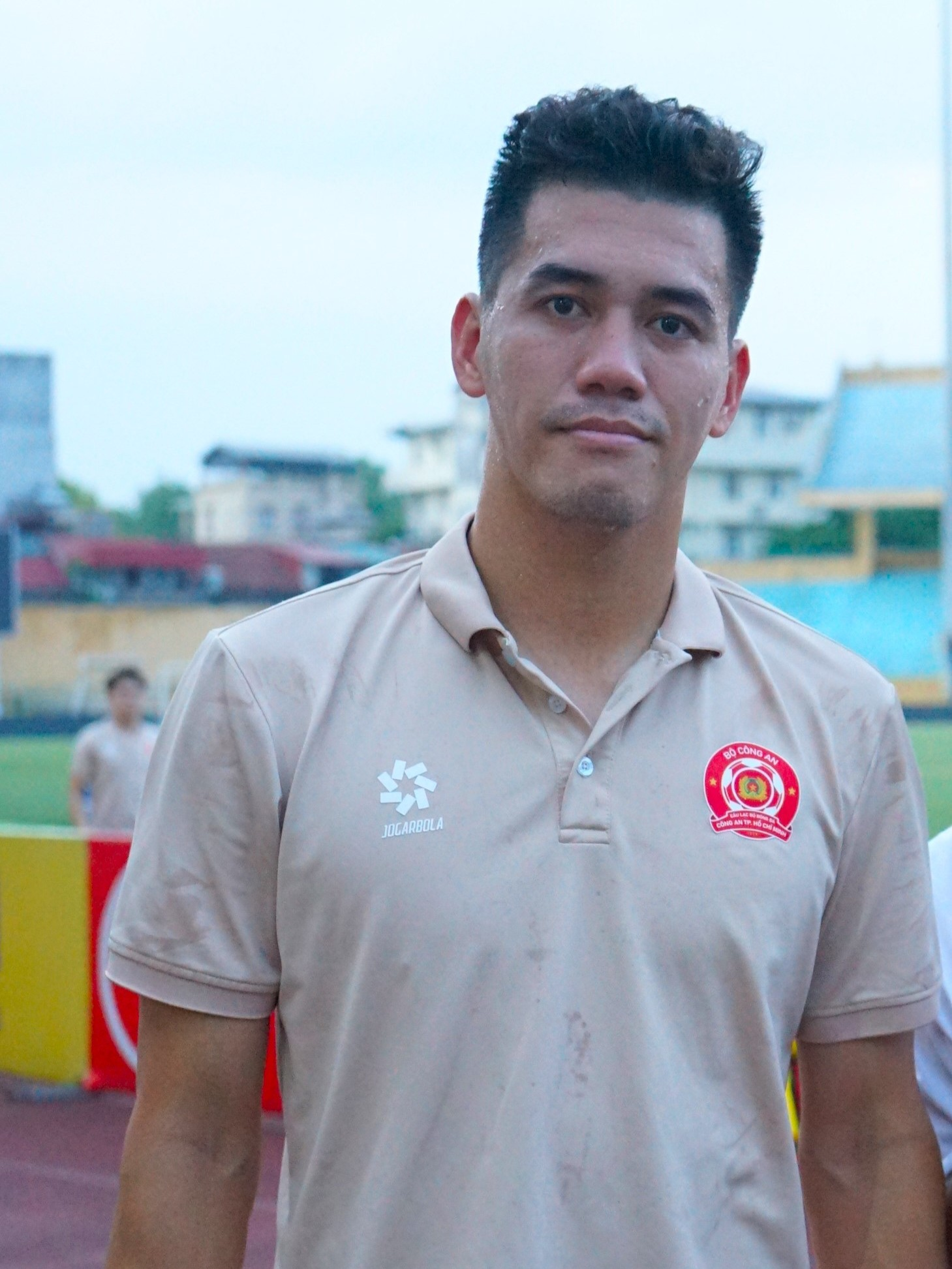
- Tiến Linh in 2026

Personal information
- Full name: Nguyễn Tiến Linh
- Date of birth: 20 October 1997 (age 29)
- Place of birth: Cẩm Giàng, Hải Dương, Vietnam
- Height: 1.81 m (5 ft 11 in)
- Position: Striker

Team information
- Current team: Công An Hồ Chí Minh City
- Number: 22

Youth career
- 2009–2015: Becamex Bình Dương

Senior career*
Years	Team	Apps	(Gls)
2016–2025	Becamex Bình Dương	181	(70)
2025–	Công An Hồ Chí Minh City	31	(8)

International career^{‡}
2015–2017	Vietnam U19	11	(5)
2018–2022	Vietnam U23	21	(12)
2018–	Vietnam	66	(26)
Medal record
Men's football
Representing Vietnam
ASEAN Championship
Winner	ASEAN 2018	Team
Runner-up	ASEAN 2022	Team
Winner	ASEAN 2024	Team
SEA Games
Gold medal – first place	2019 Philippines	Team
Gold medal – first place	2021 Vietnam	Team
- * Club domestic league appearances and goals as of 7 November 2026 ‡ National team caps and goals as of 19 November 2025

Nguyễn Tiến Linh (born 20 October 1997) is a Vietnamese professional footballer who plays as a striker for V.League 1 club Công An Hồ Chí Minh City, which he captains, and the Vietnam national team.

In 2021, Tiến Linh was nominated by a panel of sports journalists and football experts for Best Footballer in Asia. He is considered one of the best Vietnamese footballers of his generation, and one of the best strikers in Southeast Asia at the moment. Linh won the Vietnamese Golden Ball in 2024.

== Early life ==
Nguyễn Tiến Linh was born and raised in the Cẩm Hoàng commune of the Cẩm Giang district, Hải Dương, Northern Vietnam. At the age of 2, his mother moved to South Korea for work, leaving him alone with his father for 7 years. At the age of 6, he followed his father further south to Bình Dương for permanent settlement. His mother returned to Vietnam when he was 9 years old.

Tiến Linh began playing football for his school team. At the age of 13, he followed his PE teacher's advice and participated in the trial test of Becamex Bình Dương, in which he was later admitted to the club. At first, he played as midfielder, but then switched to striker.

== Club career ==
=== Becamex Bình Dương ===
With 5 goals, Tiến Linh was the top scorer of Vietnamese National U-19 Football Championship in 2015. In 2016, Tiến Linh made his first debut with Becamex Bình Dương .

Over 4 years, Tiến Linh scored 26 goals: 15 in 2018, 5 in 2020, and 6 in 2021 before the cancellation of the league due to COVID-19. Becamex Binh Duong won the Vietnamese National Football Super Cup and also placed second in the Vietnamese National Football Super Cup, also earning the Vietnamese Bronze Ball in 2021. In 2022, he earned the Vietnamese Silver Ball.

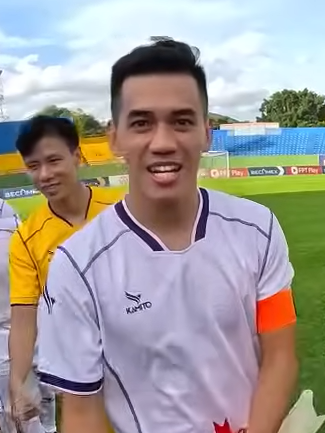
Tiến Linh with Becamex Bình Dương in 2024

Tiến Linh won the Vietnamese Golden Ball award for the first time in 2024. In the 2024–25 season, Tiến Linh netted 14 goals and was initially the joint top scorer of V.League 1. However, one of his goals was cancelled after the league's examination as it was an own goal, which led Tiến Linh to lose his top scorer award.

=== Công An Hồ Chí Minh City ===
On 1 August 2025, Tiến Linh departed from Becamex Bình Dương and signed for league fellow Công An Hồ Chí Minh City.

== International career ==
=== 2018: Debut for Vietnam and AFF Championship title ===
On 8 November 2018, Tiến Linh made his debut for the national team in the match against Laos. He scored his first goal for Vietnam against Cambodia in their last group match. At the end, Tiến Linh and Vietnam won 2018 AFF Championship.

=== 2019-present ===
==== 2022 World Cup qualification ====
On 15 October 2019, Tiến Linh scored his first goal in 2022 FIFA World Cup qualification against Indonesia. A month later, he scored the only goal against UAE. In June 2021, he scored 3 goals in the last 3 matches of the second round of 2022 FIFA World Cup qualification to promote Vietnam to the third round. On 1 February 2022, he scored a goal in the match against China to surpass Le Cong Vinh as the top scorer for Vietnam in the history of World Cup qualification.

==== 2020 AFF Championship ====
In 2020 AFF Championship, he scored a brace in a 4–0 win against Cambodia, but his team lost in the semi-finals to Thailand.

==== 2022 AFF Championship ====
Tiến Linh scored 6 goals in 2022 AFF Championship to share the top goalscorer award with Thai striker Teerasil Dangda, but Vietnam once again lost Thailand by 2–3 on aggregate in the finals.

==== 2026 World Cup qualification ====
During the 2nd round, Tiến Linh scored two goals against the Philippines and was awarded the Player of the Match title. Vietnam however was eliminated of the World Cup.

==== 2024 ASEAN Championship ====
Tiến Linh scored 4 goals in 2024 ASEAN Championship, where he combined with the naturalized player Nguyễn Xuân Son to become a perfect duo of strikers who contributed greatly to help Vietnam winning the Southeast Asian championship for the third time.

== Career statistics ==
=== Club ===
As of match played on 18 November 2026

Appearances and goals by club, season and competition
Club	Season	League			Cup		Continental		Other		Total	
Club	Season	Division	Apps	Goals	Apps	Goals	Apps	Goals	Apps	Goals	Apps	Goals
Becamex Bình Dương	2016	V.League 1	15	2	4	1	1 (Note: Appearance(s) in AFC Champions League)	0	—		20	3
Becamex Bình Dương	2017	V.League 1	12	2	5	1	—		—		17	3
Becamex Bình Dương	2018	V.League 1	19	15	6	0	—		—		25	15
Becamex Bình Dương	2019	V.League 1	17	7	3	2	7 (Note: Appearance(s) in AFC Cup)	1	1 (Note: Appearance in Vietnamese Super Cup)	0	28	10
Becamex Bình Dương	2020	V.League 1	18	5	1	0	—		—		19	5
Becamex Bình Dương	2021	V.League 1	11	6	1	0	—		—		12	6
Becamex Bình Dương	2022	V.League 1	20	9	0	0	—		—		20	9
Becamex Bình Dương	2023	V.League 1	18	3	2	1	—		—		20	4
Becamex Bình Dương	2023–24	V.League 1	26	8	3	3	—		—		29	11
Becamex Bình Dương	2024–25	V.League 1	25	13	4	2	—		—		29	15
Becamex Bình Dương	Total		181	70	29	10	8	1	1	0	219	81
Cong An Hồ Chí Minh City	2025–26	V.League 1	25	6	3	1	—		—		28	7
Cong An Hồ Chí Minh City	2026–27	V.League 1	6	2	0	0	—		2 (Note: One appearance in Vietnamese Super Cup, one appearance in ASEAN Club Championship)	0	8	2
Cong An Hồ Chí Minh City	Total		31	8	3	1	—		2	0	36	9
Total career			212	78	32	11	8	1	3	0	255	90

=== International ===
As of match played 9 October 2025

Appearances and goals by national team and year
National Team	Year	Apps	Goals
Vietnam	2018	6	2
Vietnam	2019	7	2
Vietnam	2021	16	7
Vietnam	2022	7	3
Vietnam	2023	9	4
Vietnam	2024	13	7
Vietnam	2025	8	1
Total		66	26

Scores and results list Vietnam's goal tally first.

List of international goals scored by Nguyễn Tiến Linh
No.	Date	Venue	Opponent	Score	Result	Competition
1.	24 November 2018	Hàng Đẫy Stadium, Hanoi, Vietnam	Cambodia	1–0	3–0	2018 AFF Championship
2.	25 December 2018	Mỹ Đình National Stadium, Hanoi, Vietnam	North Korea	1–0	1–1	Friendly
3.	15 October 2019	Kapten I Wayan Dipta Stadium, Gianyar, Indonesia	Indonesia	3–0	3–1	2022 FIFA World Cup qualification
4.	14 November 2019	Mỹ Đình National Stadium, Hanoi, Vietnam	United Arab Emirates	1–0	1–0	2022 FIFA World Cup qualification
5.	7 June 2021	Al-Maktoum Stadium, Dubai, United Arab Emirates	Indonesia	1–0	4–0	2022 FIFA World Cup qualification
6.	11 June 2021	Al-Maktoum Stadium, Dubai, United Arab Emirates	Malaysia	1–0	2–1	2022 FIFA World Cup qualification
7.	15 June 2021	Zabeel Stadium, Dubai, United Arab Emirates	United Arab Emirates	1–3	2–3	2022 FIFA World Cup qualification
8.	7 October 2021	Sharjah Stadium, Sharjah, United Arab Emirates	China	2–2	2–3	2022 FIFA World Cup qualification
9.	12 October 2021	Sultan Qaboos Sports Complex, Muscat, Oman	Oman	1–0	1–3	2022 FIFA World Cup qualification
10.	19 December 2021	Bishan Stadium, Bishan, Singapore	Cambodia	1–0	4–0	2020 AFF Championship
11.	19 December 2021	Bishan Stadium, Bishan, Singapore	Cambodia	2–0	4–0	2020 AFF Championship
12.	1 February 2022	Mỹ Đình National Stadium, Hanoi, Vietnam	China	2–0	3–1	2022 FIFA World Cup qualification
13.	21 December 2022	New Laos National Stadium, Vientiane, Laos	Laos	1–0	6–0	2022 AFF Championship
14.	27 December 2022	Mỹ Đình National Stadium, Hanoi, Vietnam	Malaysia	1–0	3–0	2022 AFF Championship
15.	3 January 2023	Mỹ Đình National Stadium, Hanoi, Vietnam	Myanmar	2–0	3–0	2022 AFF Championship
16.	9 January 2023	Mỹ Đình National Stadium, Hanoi, Vietnam	Indonesia	1–0	2–0	2022 AFF Championship
17.	9 January 2023	Mỹ Đình National Stadium, Hanoi, Vietnam	Indonesia	2–0	2–0	2022 AFF Championship
18.	13 January 2023	Mỹ Đình National Stadium, Hanoi, Vietnam	Thailand	1–0	2–2	2022 AFF Championship
19.	6 June 2024	Mỹ Đình National Stadium, Hanoi, Vietnam	Philippines	1–1	3–2	2026 FIFA World Cup qualification
20.	6 June 2024	Mỹ Đình National Stadium, Hanoi, Vietnam	Philippines	2–1	3–2	2026 FIFA World Cup qualification
21.	10 September 2024	Mỹ Đình National Stadium, Hanoi, Vietnam	Thailand	1–0	1–2	2024 LPBank Cup
22.	9 December 2024	New Laos National Stadium, Vientiane, Laos	Laos	2–0	4–1	2024 ASEAN Championship
23.	21 December 2024	Việt Trì Stadium, Việt Trì, Vietnam	Myanmar	5–0	5–0	2024 ASEAN Championship
24.	26 December 2024	Jalan Besar Stadium, Kallang, Singapore	Singapore	1–0	2–0	2024 ASEAN Championship
25.	29 December 2024	Việt Trì Stadium, Việt Trì, Vietnam	Singapore	3–1	3–1	2024 ASEAN Championship
26.	9 October 2025	Gò Đậu Stadium, Hồ Chí Minh City, Vietnam	Nepal	1–0	3–1	2027 AFC Asian Cup qualification

== Honours ==
Becamex Bình Dương

- Vietnamese National Cup: 2018
- Vietnamese Super Cup: 2016

Công An Hồ Chí Minh City

- Vietnamese National Cup: 2025–26

Vietnam

- ASEAN Championship: 2018, 2024

Vietnam U23

- SEA Games gold medal: 2019, 2021

Individual

- Vietnamese Bronze Ball: 2021
- ASEAN Championship Top scorer: 2022
- ASEAN Championship All-Star XI: 2022, 2024
- Vietnamese Silver Ball: 2022
- Vietnamese Golden Ball: 2024
- V.League 1 Team of the Season: 2024–25

Orders

- Third-class Labor Order: 2025
