= Best Footballer in Asia 2016 =

4th annual Best Footballer in Asia award

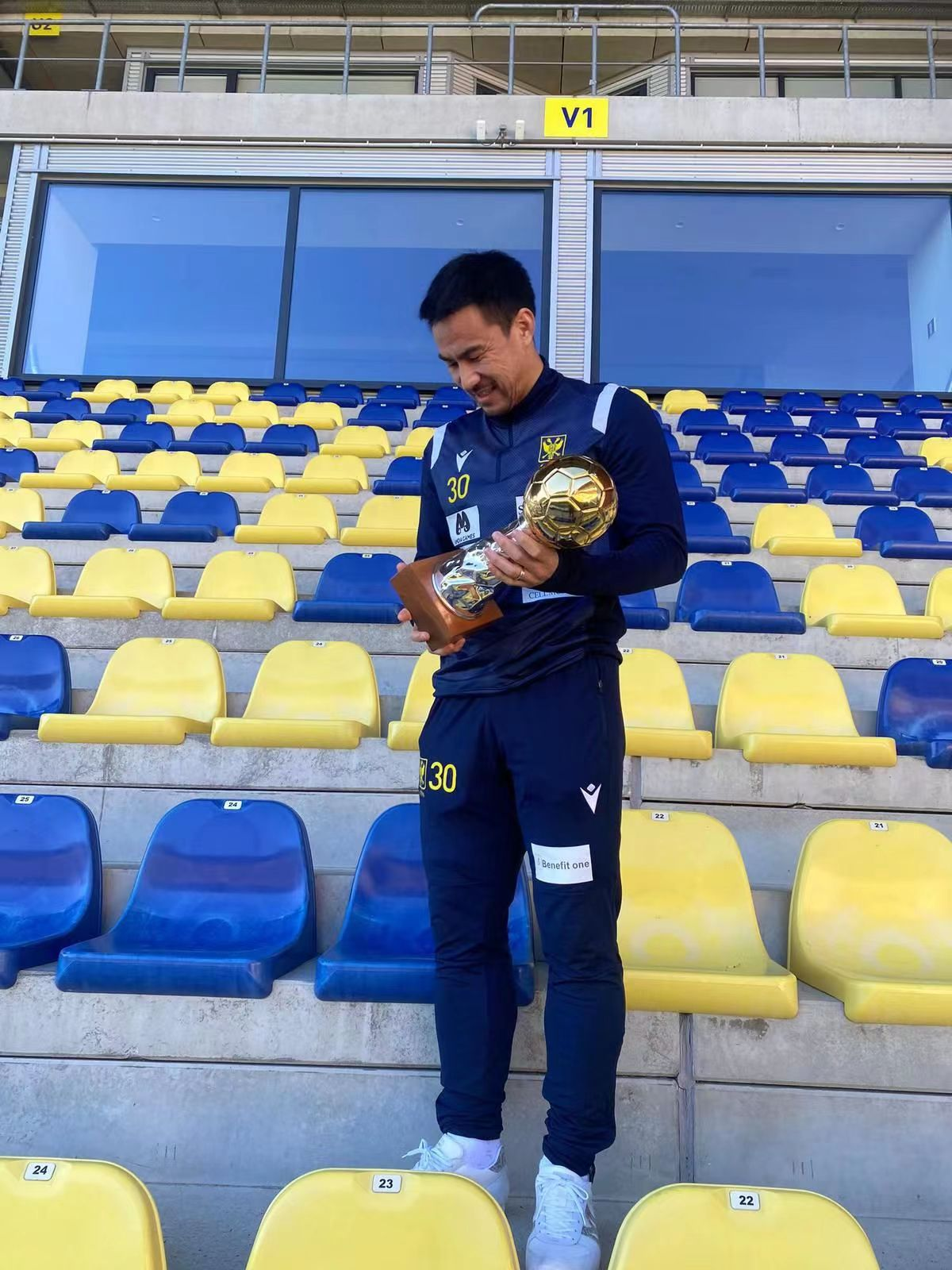
Shinji Okazaki displayed the Best Footballer in Asia trophy in Stayen of Sint-Truiden on 8 February 2023.

The 2016 Best Footballer in Asia, given to the best football player in Asia as judged by a panel of 38 sports journalists, was awarded to Shinji Okazaki on 26 December 2016.

== Voting ==
The prize witnessed the first significant enlargement of the panel of jurors since its birth. There were 38 jurors in the panel. 33 jurors were from different AFC nations/regions including Afghanistan, Australia, Bahrain, Cambodia, China, Chinese Taipei, Hong Kong, India, Indonesia, Iran, Iraq, Japan, Jordan, Korea Republic, Kuwait, Lebanon, Macao, Malaysia, Myanmar, Oman, Pakistan, Palestine, Philippines, Qatar, Saudi Arabia, Singapore, Syria, Tajikistan, Thailand, Turkmenistan, United Arabic Emirates, Uzbekistan and Vietnam. Five jurors were invited from non-AFC media outlets.

== Rules ==
Each juror selects 5 best footballers and awards them 5, 4, 3, 2 points and 1 point respectively from their first choice to the fifth choice. The trophy of the Best Footballer in Asia is awarded to the player with the highest total of points.

=== Tiebreakers ===
When two or more candidates obtain the same points, the rankings of the concerned candidates would be based upon the following criteria in order.

- a) The number of the 1st-place vote obtained
- b) The number of the 2nd-place vote obtained
- c) The number of the 3rd-place vote obtained
- d) The number of the 4th-place vote obtained

If all conditions are equal, the concerned candidates will be tied in rankings.

== Ranking ==
Rank	Name	Club(s)	Points
1	(Japan) Shinji Okazaki	(England) Leicester City	126
2	(United Arab Emirates) Omar Abdulrahman	(United Arab Emirates) Al-Ain	123
3	(South Korea) Son Heung-min	(England) Tottenham Hotspur	109
4	(Iran) Sardar Azmoun	(Russia) Rostov	46
5	(Brazil) Leonardo	(South Korea) Jeonbuk Hyundai Motors	34
6	(Japan) Genki Haraguchi	(Germany) Hertha BSC	30
7	(Iraq) Hammadi Ahmad	(Iraq) Al-Quwa Al-Jawiya	16
8	(Brazil) Paulinho	(China) Guangzhou Evergrande	15
9	(Brazil) Adriano	(South Korea) FC Seoul	13
10	(China) Wu Lei	(China) Shanghai SIPG	11
11	(South Korea) Koo Ja-cheol	(Germany) FC Augsburg	10
12	(Japan) Hiroshi Kiyotake	(Germany) Hannover 96 (Spain) Sevilla	7
13	(South Korea) Lee Jae-sung	(South Korea) Jeonbuk Hyundai Motors	6
14	(Brazil) Romarinho	(Qatar) El Jaish	5
15	(Australia) Tom Rogic	(Scotland) Celtic	5
15	(Thailand) Chanathip Songkrasin	(Thailand) Muangthong United	5
17	(United Arab Emirates) Ahmed Khalil	(United Arab Emirates) Al-Ahli	4
18	(Australia) Aaron Mooy	(Australia) Melbourne City (England) Huddersfield Town	2
19	(Uzbekistan) Sardor Rashidov	(Qatar) El Jaish	2
20	(South Korea) Kwon Sun-Tae	(South Korea) Jeonbuk Hyundai Motors	1
