= Best Footballer in Asia 2023 =

11th annual Best Footballer in Asia award

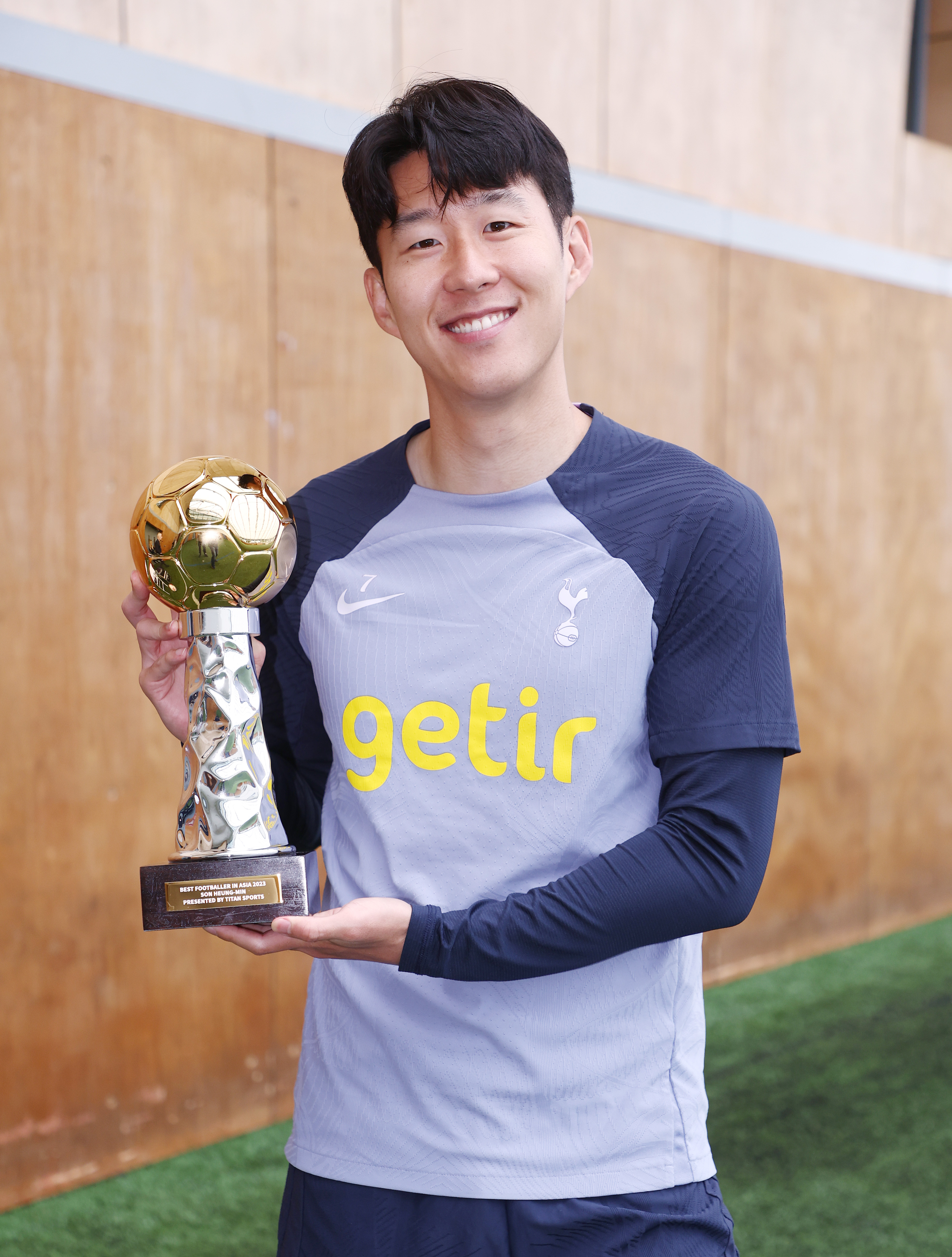
Son Heung-min was conferred the Best Footballer in Asia 2023 trophy and his ninth in the training center of Tottenham Hotspur on May 16, 2024

The Best Footballer in Asia 2023, recognizing the best male footballer in Asia in 2023, was the 11th edition of the Best Footballer in Asia. Son Heung-min claimed the award on 15 January 2024. It was his seventh Best Footballer in Asia title in a row, and eighth title overall. The event was judged by a panel of sixty-three sports journalists. Son received 17 first-place votes, 24 second-place votes, 7 third-place votes, 5 fourth-place votes, 2 fifth-place votes and finished on 231 points in total.

== Voting ==
63 judges were invited to vote, including 42 representatives from AFC nations/regions which comprise Afghanistan, Australia, Bahrain, Bangladesh, Cambodia, China, Chinese Taipei, Guam，Hong Kong, India, Indonesia, Iran, Iraq, Japan, Jordan, Laos，Korea Republic, Kuwait, Kyrgyzstan, Lebanon, Macao, Malaysia, Maldives, Mongolia, Myanmar, Nepal, Oman, Pakistan, Palestine, Philippines, Qatar, Saudi Arabia, Singapore, Sri Lanka, Syria, Tajikistan, Thailand, Turkmenistan, United Arabic Emirates, Uzbekistan, Vietnam and Yemen. The other twenty jurors were independent Asian football experts or from high-profile media outlets. Before voting, all judges were given a 25-player shortlist, but could choose other eligible players.

== Rules ==
Each juror selected their five best footballers and awarded them five, four, three, two and one point respectively from their first choice to the fifth choice. A trophy for the Best Footballer in Asia was awarded to the player with the highest total of points.

=== Tiebreakers ===
When two or more candidates obtained the same points, the rankings of the concerned candidates was based upon the following criteria in order:

- a) The number of first-place vote obtained
- b) The number of second-place vote obtained
- c) The number of third-place vote obtained
- d) The number of fourth-place vote obtained

If all conditions were equal, the concerned candidates tied.

If the concerned candidates were tied for first place, the award and the trophy were shared.

== Ranking ==
Rank	Player	Club(s)	Points
1	(South Korea) Son Heung-min	(England) Tottenham Hotspur	231
2	(South Korea) Kim Min-jae	(Italy) Napoli (Germany) Bayern Munich	197
3	(Portugal) Cristiano Ronaldo	(Saudi Arabia) Al Nassr	172
4	(Japan) Kaoru Mitoma	(England) Brighton & Hove Albion	101
5	(Iran) Mehdi Taremi	(Portugal) Porto	55
6	(Japan) Takefusa Kubo	(Spain) Real Sociedad	48
7	(Saudi Arabia) Salem Al-Dawsari	(Saudi Arabia) Al Hilal	42
8	(Japan) Wataru Endo	(Germany) VfB Stuttgart (England) Liverpool	40
9	(South Korea) Hwang Hee-chan	(England) Wolverhampton Wanderers	33
10	(South Korea) Lee Kang-in	(Spain) Mallorca (France) Paris Saint-Germain	14
11	(Brazil) Talisca	(Saudi Arabia) Al Nassr	13
12	(Iran) Sardar Azmoun	(Germany) Bayer Leverkusen (Italy) Roma	8
13	(Japan) Hiroki Sakai	(Japan) Urawa Red Diamonds	8
14	(Japan) Kyogo Furuhashi	(Scotland) Celtic	7
15	(Japan) Takehiro Tomiyasu	(England) Arsenal	7
16	(Saudi Arabia) Saud Abdulhamid	(Saudi Arabia) Al Hilal	6
17	(India) Sunil Chhetri	(India) Bengaluru	6
18	(South Korea) Jeong Woo-yeong	(Germany) SC Freiburg (Germany) VfB Stuttgart	4
19	(Morocco) Abderrazak Hamdallah	(Saudi Arabia) Al-Ittihad	3
19	(Kenya) Michael Olunga	(Qatar) Al-Duhail	3
19	(Denmark) Alexander Scholz	(Japan) Urawa Red Diamonds	3
22	(Japan) Yuya Osako	(Japan) Vissel Kobe	2
23	(Iran) Alireza Jahanbakhsh	(Netherlands) Feyenoord	2
24	(Thailand) Theerathon Bunmathan	(Thailand) Buriram United	1
24	(Uzbekistan) Eldor Shomurodov	(Italy) Spezia (Italy) Cagliari	1
24	(Australia) Harry Souttar	(England) Leicester City	1
