= Best Footballer in Asia 2024 =

12th annual Best Footballer in Asia award

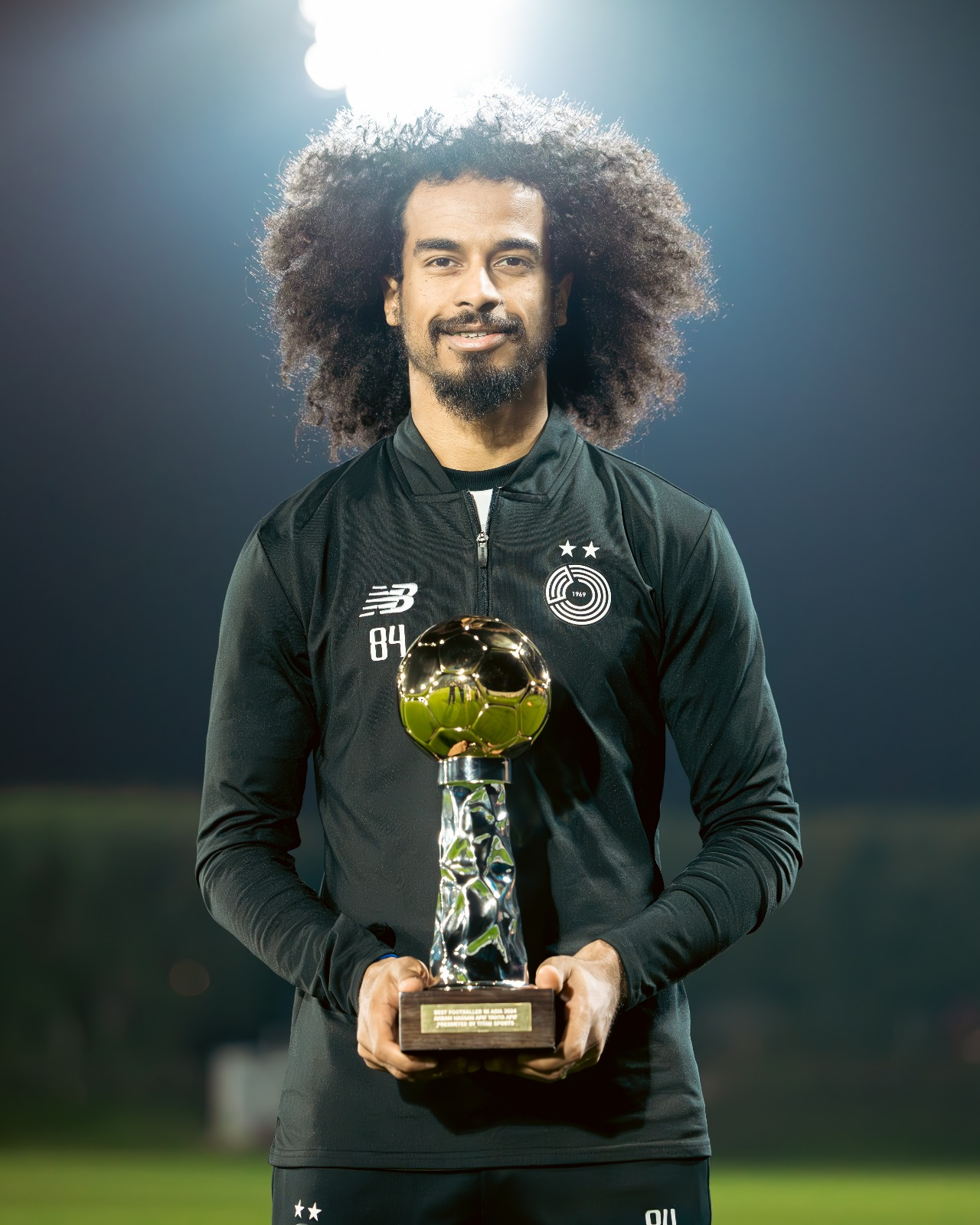
Akram Afif received the Best Footballer in Asia 2024 trophy in the training center of Al-Sadd on February 6, 2025

The Best Footballer in Asia 2024, recognizing the best male footballer in Asia in 2024, was the 12th edition of the Best Footballer in Asia. Akram Afif claimed the award on 21 October 2024. It was the first time that the Best Footballer in Asia was awarded to a player from West Asia. The event was judged by a panel of sixty-three sports journalists. Akram Afif received 18 first-place votes, 13 second-place votes, 2 third-place votes, 8 fourth-place votes, 3 fifth-place votes and finished on 181 points in total.

Due to the change of its calendar in line with the new Asian football calendar, the Best Footballer in Asia 2024, as a transitional edition, only takes account of the time range between January, 1st, 2024 to 15 August 2024 (rather than a whole calendar year as before).

== Voting ==
63 judges were invited to vote, including 42 representatives from AFC nations/regions which comprise Afghanistan, Australia, Bahrain, Bangladesh, Cambodia, China, Chinese Taipei, Guam，Hong Kong, India, Indonesia, Iran, Iraq, Japan, Jordan, Laos，Korea Republic, Kuwait, Kyrgyzstan, Lebanon, Macao, Malaysia, Maldives, Mongolia, Myanmar, Nepal, Oman, Pakistan, Palestine, Philippines, Qatar, Saudi Arabia, Singapore, Sri Lanka, Syria, Tajikistan, Thailand, Turkmenistan, United Arabic Emirates, Uzbekistan, Vietnam and Yemen. The other twenty jurors were independent Asian football experts or from high-profile media outlets. Before voting, all judges were given a 25-player shortlist, but could choose other eligible players.

== Ranking ==
The votes were based on the results from 1 January to 15 August.

Rank	Player	Club(s)	Points
1	(Qatar) Akram Afif	(Qatar) Al-Sadd	181
2	(South Korea) Son Heung-min	(England) Tottenham Hotspur	168
3	(Morocco) Soufiane Rahimi	(United Arab Emirates) Al Ain	115
4	(Portugal) Cristiano Ronaldo	(Saudi Arabia) Al Nassr	109
5	(Serbia) Aleksandar Mitrović	(Saudi Arabia) Al Hilal	69
6	(Jordan) Musa Al-Taamari	(France) Montpellier	53
7	(Iran) Mehdi Taremi	(Portugal) Porto	45
8	(Japan) Wataru Endō	(England) Liverpool	44
9	(South Korea) Lee Kang-in	(France) Paris Saint-Germain	41
10	(Japan) Takefusa Kubo	(Spain) Real Sociedad	39
11	(Jordan) Yazan Al-Naimat	(Qatar) Al Ahli	18
12	(Iraq) Ayman Hussein	(Iraq) Al-Quwa Al-Jawiya (Qatar) Al Khor	18
13	(Saudi Arabia) Saud Abdulhamid	(Saudi Arabia) Al Hilal	16
14	(Japan) Hiroki Ito	(Germany) VfB Stuttgart	9
15	(Saudi Arabia) Salem Al-Dawsari	(Saudi Arabia) Al Hilal	9
16	(Spain) Aymeric Laporte	(Saudi Arabia) Al Nassr	8
17	(Japan) Takumi Minamino	(France) AS Monaco	7
18	(Japan) Takehiro Tomiyasu	(England) Arsenal	7
19	(Uzbekistan) Abbosbek Fayzullaev	(Russia) CSKA Moscow	6
20	(Japan) Hidemasa Morita	(Portugal) Sporting CP	6
21	(Qatar) Hassan Al Haydos	(Qatar) Al-Sadd	5
21	(Australia) Jackson Irvine	(Germany) St. Pauli	5
23	(Iraq) Ali Jasim	(Iraq) Al-Quwa Al-Jawiya	5
24	(Qatar) Meshaal Barsham	(Qatar) Al-Sadd	4
25	(Morocco) Yassine Bounou	(Saudi Arabia) Al Hilal	3
25	(South Korea) Hwang Hee-chan	(England) Wolverhampton Wanderers	3
25	(Japan) Joel Chima Fujita	(Belgium) Sint-Truiden	3
25	(United Arab Emirates) Khalid Al-Hashemi	(United Arab Emirates) Al Ain	3
29	(United Arab Emirates) Khalid Eisa	(United Arab Emirates) Al Ain	2
29	(South Korea) Kim Min-jae	(Germany) Bayern Munich	2
29	(Japan) Ayase Ueda	(Netherlands) Feyenoord	2
32	(India) Sunil Chhetri	(India) Bengaluru	1
32	(Japan) Ritsu Doan	(Germany) SC Freiburg	1
32	(Australia) Nestory Irankunda	(Australia) Adelaide United	1
