= Best Footballer in Asia 2017 =

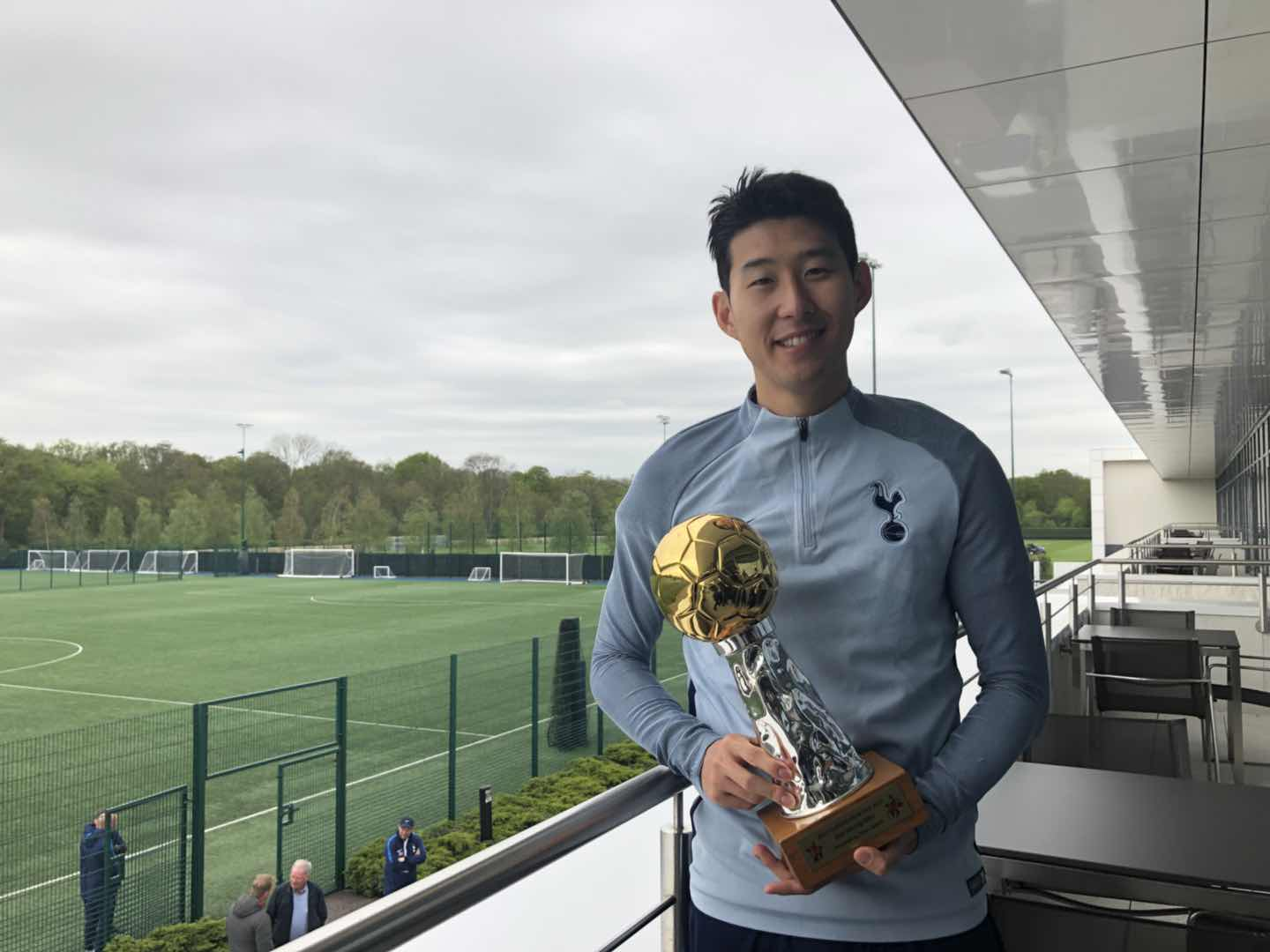
Son Heung-min was conferred the Best Footballer in Asia trophy in the training center of Tottenham Hotspurs on 24 April 2018.

The 2017 Best Footballer in Asia, given to the best football player in Asia as judged by a panel of 42 sports journalists, was awarded to Son Heung-min on 5 January 2018. Son thus became the first footballer who had won the award for three times.

== Voting ==
In this edition of Best Footballer in Asia, 42 jurors were invited to vote. Among the 42 jurors, 36 of them represent different AFC nations/regions including Afghanistan, Australia, Bahrain, Bangladesh, Cambodia, China, Chinese Taipei, Hong Kong, India, Indonesia, Iran, Iraq, Japan, Jordan, Korea Republic, Kuwait, Kyrgyzstan, Lebanon, Macao, Malaysia, Myanmar, Oman, Pakistan, Palestine, Philippines, Qatar, Saudi Arabia, Singapore, Syria, Tajikistan, Thailand, Turkmenistan, United Arabic Emirates, Uzbekistan, Vietnam and Yemen. Six other jurors were invited representing well-known football media outlets or as independent Asian football experts.

== Rules ==
Each juror selects 5 best footballers and awards them 6, 4, 3, 2 points and 1 point respectively from their first choice to the fifth choice. The trophy of the Best Footballer in Asia is awarded to the player with the highest total of points.

=== Tiebreakers ===
When two or more candidates obtain the same points, the rankings of the concerned candidates would be based upon the following criteria in order.

- a) The number of the 1st-place vote obtained
- b) The number of the 2nd-place vote obtained
- c) The number of the 3rd-place vote obtained
- d) The number of the 4th-place vote obtained

If all conditions are equal, the concerned candidates will be tied in rankings.

If the concerned candidates are tied in the first-place, the concerned candidates will share the award and the trophy.

== Ranking ==
Rank	Name	Club(s)	Points
1	(South Korea) Son Heung-min	(England) Tottenham Hotspur	157
2	(Syria) Omar Kharbin	(Saudi Arabia) Al-Hilal	127
3	(Brazil) Rafael Silva	(Japan) Urawa Red Diamonds	57
4	(Iran) Sardar Azmoun	(Russia) Rostov (Russia) Rubin Kazan	51
5	(Brazil) Paulinho	(China) Guangzhou Evergrande (Spain) Barcelona	44
6	(Australia) Aaron Mooy	(England) Huddersfield Town	33
7	(United Arab Emirates) Omar Abdulrahman	(United Arab Emirates) Al-Ain	31
8	(Syria) Omar Al Somah	(Saudi Arabia) Al-Ahli	25
9	(Japan) Yuki Abe	(Japan) Urawa Red Diamonds	23
10	(China) Wu Lei	(China) Shanghai SIPG	19
11	(Iran) Reza Ghoochannejhad	(Netherlands) Heerenveen	16
12	(Iran) Mehdi Taremi	(Iran) Persepolis	13
13	(Brazil) Carlos Eduardo	(Saudi Arabia) Al-Hilal	11
14	(Japan) Shusaku Nishikawa	(Japan) Urawa Red Diamonds	10
15	(Iran) Alireza Jahanbakhsh	(Netherlands) AZ	6
16	(Thailand) Chanathip Songkrasin	(Thailand) Muangthong United (Japan) Consadole Sapporo	6
17	(Japan) Yuto Nagatomo	(Italy) Inter Milan	6
18	(Saudi Arabia) Nawaf Al-Abed	(Saudi Arabia) Al-Hilal	6
19	(Australia) Tomi Juric	(Switzerland) Luzern	5
20	(Japan) Tomoaki Makino	(Japan) Urawa Red Diamonds	5
21	(Japan) Kengo Nakamura	(Japan) Kawasaki Frontale	4
22	(Tajikistan) Manuchekhr Dzhalilov	(Tajikistan) Istiklol	4
23	(Japan) Maya Yoshida	(England) Southampton	4
24	(Japan) Kosuke Nakamura	(Japan) Kashiwa Reysol	3
25	(India) Sunil Chhetri	(India) Bengaluru	2
25	(Australia) Matthew Leckie	(Germany) Hertha BSC	2
27	(Saudi Arabia) Yasser Al-Shahrani	(Saudi Arabia) Al-Hilal	1
27	(Saudi Arabia) Osama Hawsawi	(Saudi Arabia) Al-Hilal	1
