= Best Footballer in Asia =

Annual association football award

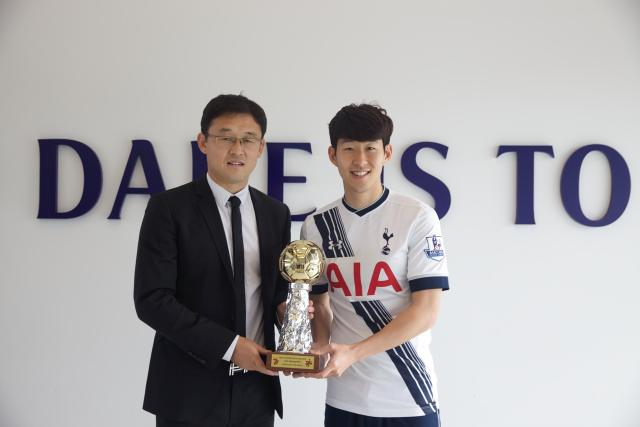
Son Heung-min was conferred the trophy by Sun Jihai, the representative of Titan Sports, in February, 2016

Best Footballer in Asia (Chinese: 亚洲金球奖) is an annual association football award organized and presented by Titan Sports. It is awarded to the player who had the best performance for Asian football during the previous calendar year.

== History ==
Inspired by Ballon d'Or and France Football, the editorial team of Titan Sports decided to launch an award in honor of the player deemed to have performed the best in Asian football over the previous year. This award was founded in 2013. The winner is voted by a panel of football journalists, the majority of whom are from nations/regions corresponding to national associations of Asian Football Confederation, while the others are from media outlets of non-AFC nations/regions.

== Eligibility ==
The prize is open to all footballers who participate Asian football, by playing for national teams or clubs affiliated to Asian Football Confederation during the targeted calendar year.

In detail, three categories of players are eligible to be nominated as candidates of the prize.

- a) Footballers who have nationality/citizenship of nations/regions corresponding to national associations affiliated to AFC, and play for football clubs affiliated to AFC. (e.g. Omar Abdulrahman, the UAE footballer playing for Al Ain won the second place in Best Footballer in Asia 2016)
- b) Footballers who play for non-AFC clubs, and are eligible to play FIFA 'A' matches during the targeted year representing national teams (either senior level or any junior level) of national associations affiliated to AFC. (e.g. Son Heung-min, who played in European leagues and Korea Republic national football team, is the record Best Footballer in Asia winner).
- c) Footballers who are not citizens of nations/regions corresponding to national associations affiliated to AFC, and play for football clubs of national associations affiliated to AFC. (e.g. Elkeson, the Brazilian striker who played for Guangzhou Evergrande won the second place of the inaugural Best Footballer in Asia)

Trophy of Best Footballer in Asia

== Voting ==
The juror team is constituted by a panel of journalists, invited from AFC nations/regions and non-AFC media outlets. Each juror contributes one vote.

== Rules ==
Each juror selects 5 best footballers and awards them 6, 4, 3, 2 points and 1 point respectively from their first choice to the fifth choice (Before 2017, the first-choice was awarded 5 points rather than 6). The trophy of the Best Footballer in Asia is awarded to the player with the highest total of points. Since 2017, the first-choice player in each vote will be awarded 6 points while the other 4 choices will still be awarded 4, 3, 2 points and 1 point respectively according to their ranking in each vote.

=== Tiebreakers ===
When two or more candidates obtain the same points, the rankings of the concerned candidates would be based upon the following criteria in order.

- a) The number of the 1st-place vote obtained
- b) The number of the 2nd-place vote obtained
- c) The number of the 3rd-place vote obtained
- d) The number of the 4th-place vote obtained

If all conditions are equal, the concerned candidates will be tied in rankings.

If the concerned candidates are tied in the first-place, the concerned candidates will share the award and the trophy.

== Winners ==
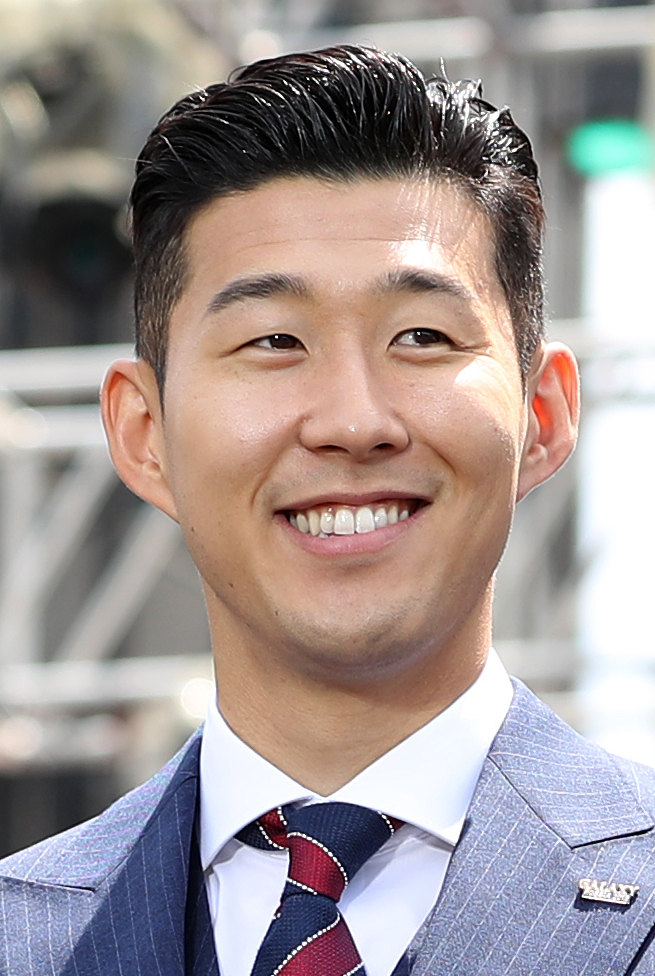
Son Heung-min is a ten-time winner of the award.

Year	Rank	Player	Club	Points	Ratio
2013	1st	(Japan) Keisuke Honda	(Russia) CSKA Moscow	46	13.9%
2013	2nd	(Brazil) Elkeson (Note: 6 first-place votes were given to Elkeson while Darío Conca won 1 first-place vote. According to the rules, Elkeson was ranked at the 2nd-place and Darío Conca was ranked at the 3rd.)	(China) Guangzhou Evergrande	32	9.7%
2013	3rd	(Argentina) Darío Conca	(China) Guangzhou Evergrande	32	9.7%
2014	1st	(South Korea) Son Heung-min	(Germany) Bayer Leverkusen	74	20.6%
2014	2nd	(Japan) Keisuke Honda	(Italy) Milan	56	15.6%
2014	3rd	(Australia) Ante Covic	(Australia) Western Sydney Wanderers	37	10.3%
2015	1st	(South Korea) Son Heung-min (Note: Son Heung-min was signed by Tottenham Hotspur from Bayer Leverkusen midway through 2015.)	(England) Tottenham Hotspur	49	16.3%
2015	2nd	(China) Zheng Zhi (Note: 4 first-place votes were given to Zheng Zhi while Ricardo Goulart won 1 first-place vote. According to the rules, Zheng Zhi was ranked at the 2nd-place and Ricardo Goulart was ranked at the 3rd.)	(China) Guangzhou Evergrande	32	10.7%
2015	3rd	(Brazil) Ricardo Goulart	(China) Guangzhou Evergrande	32	10.7%
2016	1st	(Japan) Shinji Okazaki	(England) Leicester City	126	22.1%
2016	2nd	(United Arab Emirates) Omar Abdulrahman	(United Arab Emirates) Al Ain	123	21.6%
2016	3rd	(South Korea) Son Heung-min	(England) Tottenham Hotspur	109	19.1%
2017	1st	(South Korea) Son Heung-min	(England) Tottenham Hotspur	157	23.4%
2017	2nd	(Syria) Omar Kharbin	(Saudi Arabia) Al Hilal	127	18.9%
2017	3rd	(Brazil) Rafael Silva	(Japan) Urawa Red Diamonds	57	8.5%
2018	1st	(South Korea) Son Heung-min	(England) Tottenham Hotspur	206	29.3%
2018	2nd	(Japan) Makoto Hasebe	(Germany) Eintracht Frankfurt	64	9.1%
2018	3rd	(Iran) Alireza Beiranvand	(Iran) Persepolis	50	7.1%
2019	1st	(South Korea) Son Heung-min	(England) Tottenham Hotspur	258	31.6%
2019	2nd	(Qatar) Akram Afif	(Qatar) Al Sadd	114	14.0%
2019	3rd	(Japan) Takumi Minamino	(Austria) Red Bull Salzburg	90	11.0%
2020	1st	(South Korea) Son Heung-min	(England) Tottenham Hotspur	286	35.0%
2020	2nd	(Iran) Sardar Azmoun	(Russia) Zenit Saint Petersburg	89	10.9%
2020	3rd	(Brazil) Júnior Negrão	(South Korea) Ulsan Hyundai	83	10.2%
2021	1st	(South Korea) Son Heung-min	(England) Tottenham Hotspur	242	30.3%
2021	2nd	(Iran) Sardar Azmoun	(Russia) Zenit Saint Petersburg	111	13.9%
2021	3rd	(Iran) Mehdi Taremi	(Portugal) Porto	90	11.3%
2022	1st	(South Korea) Son Heung-min	(England) Tottenham Hotspur	256	26.7%
2022	2nd	(Iran) Mehdi Taremi	(Portugal) Porto	120	12.5%
2022	3rd	(Saudi Arabia) Salem Al-Dawsari	(Saudi Arabia) Al Hilal	112	11.7%
2023	1st	(South Korea) Son Heung-min	(England) Tottenham Hotspur	231	22.9%
2023	2nd	(South Korea) Kim Min-jae (Note: Kim Min-jae was signed by Bayern Munich from Napoli midway through 2023.)	(Germany) Bayern Munich	197	19.5%
2023	3rd	(Portugal) Cristiano Ronaldo	(Saudi Arabia) Al Nassr	172	17.1%
2024	1st	(Qatar) Akram Afif	(Qatar) Al Sadd	181	18.0%
2024	2nd	(South Korea) Son Heung-min	(England) Tottenham Hotspur	168	16.7%
2024	3rd	(Morocco) Soufiane Rahimi	(United Arab Emirates) Al Ain	115	11.4%
2025	1st	(South Korea) Son Heung-min	(England) Tottenham Hotspur	146	14.3%
2025	2nd	(South Korea) Lee Kang-in	(France) Paris Saint-Germain	105	10.3%
2025	3rd	(Portugal) Cristiano Ronaldo	(Saudi Arabia) Al Nassr	91	8.9%

== Statistics ==
=== Wins by player ===
Player	Wins	2nd	3rd
(South Korea) Son Heung-min	10	1	1
(Qatar) Akram Afif	1	1	0
(Japan) Keisuke Honda	1	1	0
(Japan) Shinji Okazaki	1	0	0

=== Wins by nationality ===
Nation	Wins	2nd	3rd
South Korea	10	3	1
Japan	2	2	1
Qatar	1	1	0

== See also ==
- Asian Footballer of the Year
