= Akram Afif =

Qatari footballer (born 1996)

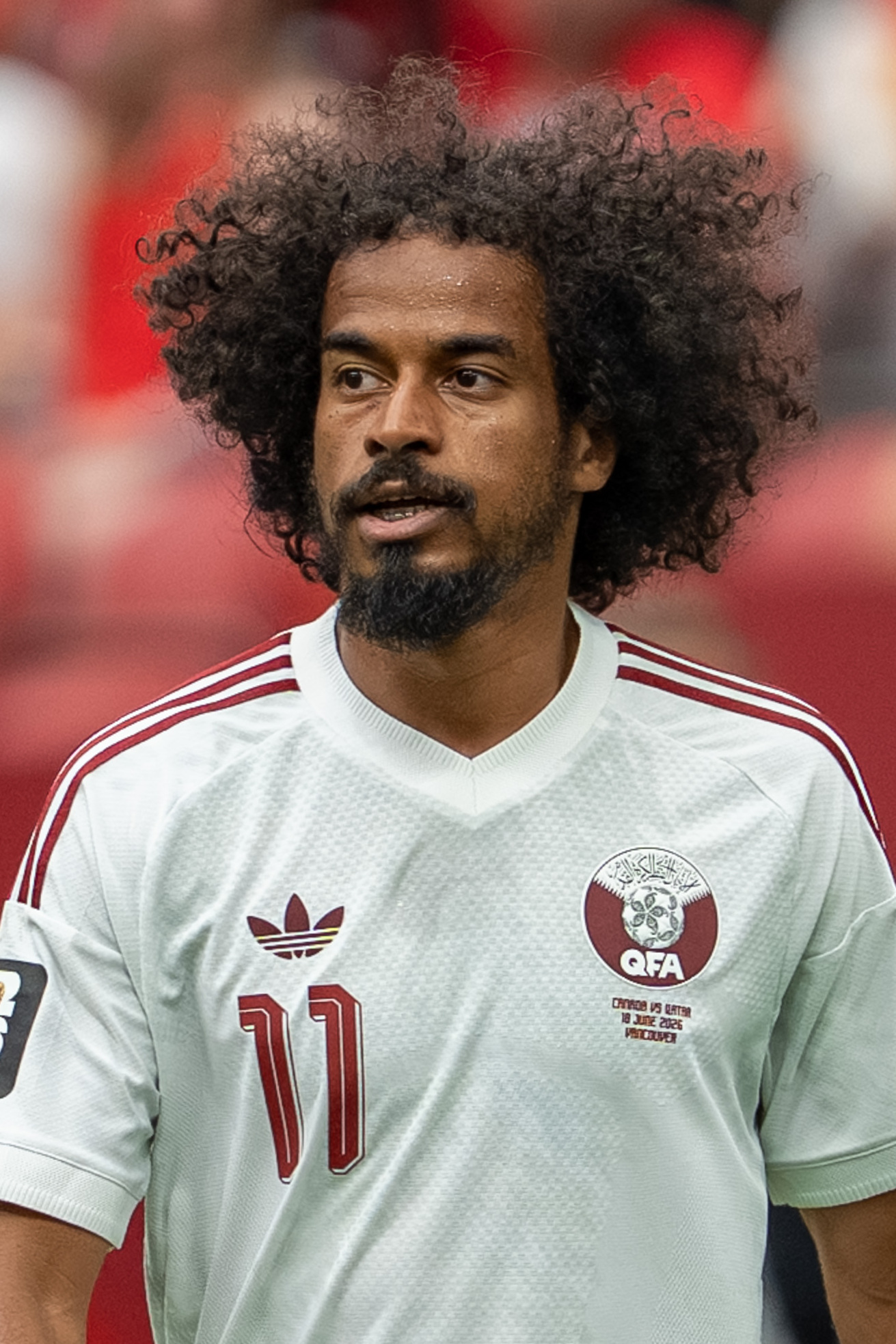
- Afif with Qatar in 2026

Personal information
- Full name: Akram Hassan Afif Yahya Afif
- Date of birth: 18 November 1996 (age 29)
- Place of birth: Doha, Qatar
- Height: 1.76 m (5 ft 9 in)
- Position: Left winger

Team information
- Current team: Al Sadd
- Number: 7

Youth career
- 2004–2006: Al Markhiya
- 2006–2009: Al Sadd
- 2009–2014: Aspire Academy
- 2012–2014: → Sevilla (loan)
- 2014–2015: Al Sadd

Senior career*
Years	Team	Apps	(Gls)
2015–2016	Eupen	26	(8)
2016–2020	Villarreal	0	(0)
2016–2017	→ Sporting Gijón (loan)	10	(0)
2017–2018	→ Eupen (loan)	16	(2)
2018–2020	→ Al Sadd (loan)	48	(44)
2020–	Al Sadd	160	(137)

International career^{‡}
2014	Qatar U19	6	(4)
2014–2015	Qatar U20	8	(2)
2015–2018	Qatar U23	12	(4)
2015–	Qatar	143	(41)
Medal record
Men's football
Representing Qatar
AFC Asian Cup
Winner	2019 United Arab Emirates
Winner	2023 Qatar
FIFA Arab Cup
Third place	2021 Qatar
CONCACAF Gold Cup (guests)
Bronze medal – third place	2021
- * Club domestic league appearances and goals as of 19:15, 10 September 2026 (UTC) ‡ National team caps and goals as of 13 November 2026

Akram Hassan Afif Yahya Afif (Arabic: أَكْرَم حَسَن عَفِيف يَحْيَى عَفِيف; born 18 November 1996) is a Qatari professional footballer who plays as a left winger for Qatar Stars League club Al Sadd and the Qatar national team.

Afif was named the Asian Footballer of the Year on two occasions, the first in 2019, after being recognized for his instrumental role in Qatar’s successful 2019 Asian Cup campaign, and the second award coming in 2023.

== Club career ==
=== Youth career ===
Akram started off in the youth teams of Al-Markhiya and then Al Sadd before joining the Aspire Academy as a full-time student in 2009. During his time at Aspire, Afif traveled to Spain on an exchange student program and played for the youth teams of Sevilla and Villarreal.

He represented Sevilla in the 2013 Al Kass International Cup, netting a brace and earning an assist in the team's first match, which ended as a 3–0 victory against Aspire Academy.

Afif also later joined Villarreal's youth team.

=== Eupen ===
In January 2015, Afif was signed by Belgian club Eupen. He scored a goal on his debut against Eendracht Aalst on 19 January 2015. In his next match against KRC Mechelen, he assisted three of his side's five goals.

Afif finished his first senior season with two goals in nine matches. On 18 March 2016, he scored a brace in a 4–0 home win against KSV Roeselare.

=== Villarreal ===
On 8 May 2016, Afif rejoined Villarreal, this time on a permanent deal. In doing so, he became the first Qatari-born signing in La Liga history. On 4 August, he was loaned to fellow top tier club Sporting de Gijón in a season-long deal.

Afif made his debut in the main category of Spanish football on 21 August 2016, coming on as a substitute for Burgui in a 2–1 home win against Athletic Bilbao. After nine league matches, he returned to his first senior club Eupen on a one-year loan deal on 14 July 2017.

=== Al Sadd ===
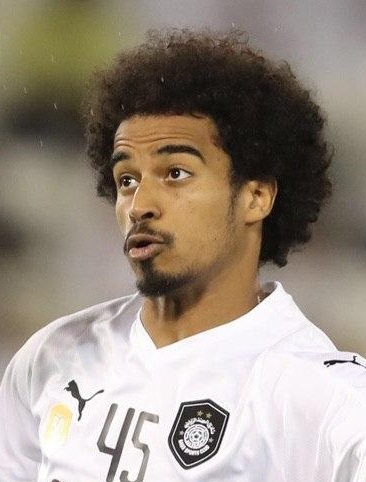
Afif playing for Al Sadd in 2020

In January 2018, Villarreal loaned Afif out to Al Sadd SC on a 1-year deal. The deal was later extended by an additional season. During his loan spell, he played in 22 league games and scored 26 goals and got 15 assists in the 2018–19 season, helping his team win the league. He was also awarded that season's Best Player Award by the Qatar Football Association (QFA). In July 2020, Afif joined Al Sadd on a permanent basis after signing a 5-year deal.

In the 2023–24 season, he played a key role in Al Sadd's successful league campaign, contributing 26 goals and 11 assists within 22 matches, thereby winning the top goal-scorer award and helping his team secure its 17th league title. His consistent performance also earned him a nomination for the Best Player Award by the QFA, which he won.

== International career ==
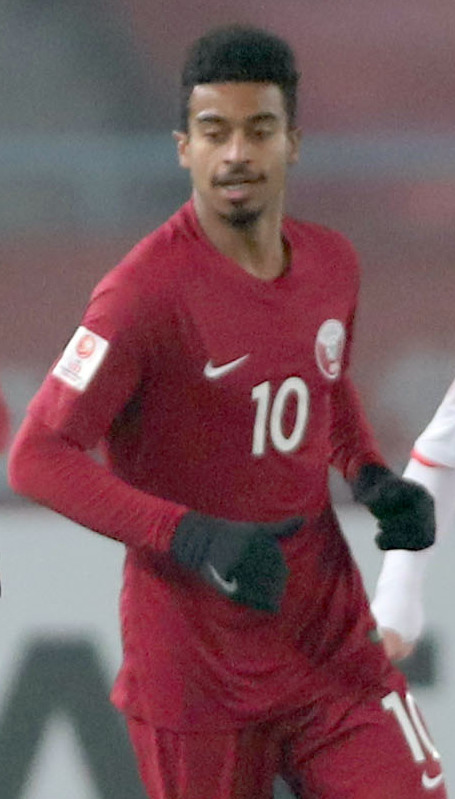
Afif playing for Qatar U23 in 2018

Afif featured in Qatar U20's AFC U-19 Championship qualification campaign in 2014. During the main tournament, he managed to score four goals, he also scored the lone goal in the final against DPR Korea to give Qatar the victory.

He was called up to the senior squad in September 2015, by coach Daniel Carreño. He scored in Qatar's 15–0 win against Bhutan on 3 September 2015 during the 2018 World Cup Qualification rounds. He also registered an assist in the match.

During Qatar's 2019 Asian Cup campaign, Afif played a paramount role in helping his team lift the trophy, registering 10 assists overall, a new record in the tournament.

On 3 January 2024, he was named in Qatar's squad for the 2023 AFC Asian Cup. In the team's opening match of the tournament, he scored twice as Qatar beat Lebanon 3–0 in Lusail. He scored the only goal of Qatar's second Group A match, a 1–0 win over Tajikistan, to put them through to the knockout stage. In the round of 16, he scored the winning goal in a 2–1 victory over Palestine. In the semi-final match against Iran, he scored a goal and provided an assist in a 3–2 victory, which qualified his country to the final for the second time in a row. Afif went on to score a hat-trick of penalties in the final which Qatar won 3–1 against Jordan, in addition, he managed to finish the tournament as the top goal-scorer with eight goals.

== Personal life ==
Afif is of Yemeni heritage. He was born in Doha, Qatar. His mother, Fayza, is of Yemeni descent from the Yafa tribe and is a homemaker. His father, Hassan Afif, is of Yemeni descent however, he played for the Somalia national team and spent a portion of his life in Somalia and was born in Moshi in Tanzania. His father previously played for Simba in Tanzania but later moved to Somalia where he went on to play for Horseed FC. He subsequently moved to Qatar and played for Al Ittihad (later renamed Al Gharafa). After retiring, he managed Al-Gharafa from 1986 until 1987 and Al-Markhiya from 2001 until 2003 and 2006 until 2007.

His brother, Ali Afif, is a footballer who plays for QSL side Umm Salal.

Afif also learned Spanish for his move to Sevilla. In June 2015, he graduated from Aspire Academy.

== Career statistics ==
=== Club ===
As of match played 10 September 2026

Appearances and goals by club, season and competition
Club	Season	League			National cup (Note: Includes Belgian Cup, Copa del Rey, Emir of Qatar Cup)		League cup (Note: Includes Qatar Crown Prince Cup/Qatar Cup)		Continental		Other		Total	
Club	Season	Division	Apps	Goals	Apps	Goals	Apps	Goals	Apps	Goals	Apps	Goals	Apps	Goals
Eupen	2014–15	Belgian Second Division	9	2	–								9	2
Eupen	2015–16	Belgian Second Division	16	6	1	0	–						17	6
Eupen	Total		25	8	1	0	–						26	8
Sporting Gijón (loan)	2016–17	La Liga	9	0	2	0	–						11	0
Eupen (loan)	2017–18	Belgian Pro League	15	1	1	0	–						16	1
Al Sadd	2017–18	Qatar Stars League	7	3	2	1	2	1	8 (Note: Appearances in AFC Champions League/AFC Champions League Elite)	0	0		19	5
Al Sadd	2018–19	Qatar Stars League	22	26	3	2	—		9	3	—		34	31
Al Sadd	2019–20	Qatar Stars League	19	15	2	0	2	3	8	5	4 (Note: One appearance in Sheikh Jassim Cup, three appearances in FIFA Club World Cup)	0	35	22
Al Sadd	2020–21	Qatar Stars League	11	5	4	2	1	0	4	2	—		20	9
Al Sadd	2021–22	Qatar Stars League	18	14	4	1	—		6	1	—		28	16
Al Sadd	2022–23	Qatar Stars League	15	10	4	1	2	0	–		1 (Note: Appearance in Qatari Stars Cup)	0	22	11
Al Sadd	2023–24	Qatar Stars League	22	26	4	1	1	1	5	0	4 (Note: Appearances in Arab Club Champions Cup)	2	36	30
Al Sadd	2024–25	Qatar Stars League	22	18	2	0	2	0	10	5	1	0	37	23
Al Sadd	2025–26	Qatar Stars League	22	15	4	2	0		10	1	0		36	18
Al Sadd	2026–27	Qatar Stars League	4	5	0	0	0	0	0	0	0	0	4	5
Al Sadd	Total		186	141	32	10	10	5	60	17	10	2	253	159
Career total			211	136	33	10	10	5	60	17	10	2	324	170

=== International ===
As of match played 12 November 2026

Appearances and goals by national team and year
National team	Year	Apps	Goals
Qatar	2015	5	1
Qatar	2016	7	0
Qatar	2017	17	4
Qatar	2018	11	6
Qatar	2019	19	6
Qatar	2020	4	2
Qatar	2021	19	4
Qatar	2022	15	3
Qatar	2023	7	0
Qatar	2024	19	13
Qatar	2025	11	2
Qatar	2026	9	0
Total		143	41

Scores and results list Qatar's goal tally first.

List of international goals scored by Akram Afif
No.	Date	Venue	Opponent	Score	Result	Competition
1.	3 September 2015	Jassim Bin Hamad Stadium, Doha, Qatar	Bhutan	10–0	15–0	2018 FIFA World Cup qualification
2.	6 June 2017	Jassim Bin Hamad Stadium, Doha, Qatar	North Korea	2–0	2–2	Friendly
3.	13 June 2017	Jassim Bin Hamad Stadium, Doha, Qatar	South Korea	2–0	3–2	2018 FIFA World Cup qualification
4.	5 September 2017	Khalifa International Stadium, Doha, Qatar	China	1–0	1–2	2018 FIFA World Cup qualification
5.	23 December 2017	Al Kuwait Sports Club Stadium, Kuwait City, Kuwait	Yemen	1–0	4–0	23rd Arabian Gulf Cup
6.	21 March 2018	Basra Sports City, Basra, Iraq	Iraq	1–0	3–2	2018 International Friendship Championship
7.	21 March 2018	Basra Sports City, Basra, Iraq	Iraq	2–1	3–2	2018 International Friendship Championship
8.	24 March 2018	Basra Sports City, Basra, Iraq	Syria	2–1	2–2	2018 International Friendship Championship
9.	11 September 2018	Khalifa International Stadium, Doha, Qatar	Palestine	2–0	3–0	Friendly
10.	12 October 2018	Jassim Bin Hamad Stadium, Doha, Qatar	Ecuador	1–0	4–3	Friendly
11.	14 November 2018	Stadio di Cornaredo, Lugano, Switzerland	Switzerland	1–0	1–0	Friendly
12.	1 February 2019	Zayed Sports City Stadium, Abu Dhabi, United Arab Emirates	Japan	3–1	3–1	2019 AFC Asian Cup final
13.	15 October 2019	Al Janoub Stadium, Al Wakrah, Qatar	Oman	1–0	2–1	2022 FIFA World Cup qualification
14.	19 November 2019	Central Republican Stadium, Dushanbe, Tajikistan	Afghanistan	1–0	1–0	2022 FIFA World Cup qualification
15.	29 November 2019	Khalifa International Stadium, Doha, Qatar	Yemen	6–0	6–0	24th Arabian Gulf Cup
16.	2 December 2019	Khalifa International Stadium, Doha, Qatar	United Arab Emirates	1–0	4–2	24th Arabian Gulf Cup
17.	2 December 2019	Khalifa International Stadium, Doha, Qatar	United Arab Emirates	2–0	4–2	24th Arabian Gulf Cup
18.	4 December 2020	Jassim Bin Hamad Stadium, Doha, Qatar	Bangladesh	2–0	5–0	2022 FIFA World Cup qualification
19.	4 December 2020	Jassim Bin Hamad Stadium, Doha, Qatar	Bangladesh	5–0	5–0	2022 FIFA World Cup qualification
20.	13 July 2021	BBVA Stadium, Houston, United States	Panama	1–0	3–3	2021 CONCACAF Gold Cup
21.	17 July 2021	BBVA Stadium, Houston, United States	Grenada	2–0	4–0	2021 CONCACAF Gold Cup
22.	3 December 2021	Education City Stadium, Al Rayyan, Qatar	Oman	1–0	2–1	2021 FIFA Arab Cup
23.	6 December 2021	Al Bayt Stadium, Al Khor, Qatar	Iraq	2–0	3–0	2021 FIFA Arab Cup
24.	26 March 2022	Education City Stadium, Al Rayyan, Qatar	Bulgaria	1–0	2–1	Friendly
25.	27 September 2022	Franz Horr Stadium, Vienna, Austria	Chile	1–1	2–2	Friendly
26.	13 October 2022	Estadio Municipal de Marbella, Marbella, Spain	Nicaragua	1–0	2–1	Friendly
27.	5 January 2024	Thani bin Jassim Stadium, Doha, Qatar	Jordan	1–0	1–2	Friendly
28.	12 January 2024	Lusail Stadium, Lusail, Qatar	Lebanon	1–0	3–0	2023 AFC Asian Cup
29.	12 January 2024	Lusail Stadium, Lusail, Qatar	Lebanon	3–0	3–0	2023 AFC Asian Cup
30.	17 January 2024	Al Bayt Stadium, Al Khor, Qatar	Tajikistan	1–0	1–0	2023 AFC Asian Cup
31.	29 January 2024	Al Bayt Stadium, Al Khor, Qatar	Palestine	2–1	2–1	2023 AFC Asian Cup
32.	7 February 2024	Al Thumama Stadium, Doha, Qatar	Iran	2–1	3–2	2023 AFC Asian Cup
33.	10 February 2024	Lusail Stadium, Lusail, Qatar	Jordan	1–0	3–1	2023 AFC Asian Cup final
34.	10 February 2024	Lusail Stadium, Lusail, Qatar	Jordan	2–1	3–1	2023 AFC Asian Cup final
35.	10 February 2024	Lusail Stadium, Lusail, Qatar	Jordan	3–1	3–1	2023 AFC Asian Cup final
36.	21 March 2024	Jassim Bin Hamad Stadium, Doha, Qatar	Kuwait	1–0	3–0	2026 FIFA World Cup qualification
37.	21 March 2024	Jassim Bin Hamad Stadium, Doha, Qatar	Kuwait	3–0	3–0	2026 FIFA World Cup qualification
38.	10 September 2024	New Laos National Stadium, Vientiane, Laos	North Korea	1–1	2–2	2026 FIFA World Cup qualification
39.	21 December 2024	Sulaibikhat Stadium, Sulaibikhat, Kuwait	United Arab Emirates	1–0	1–1	26th Arabian Gulf Cup
40.	20 March 2025	Jassim Bin Hamad Stadium, Doha, Qatar	North Korea	1–0	5–1	2026 FIFA World Cup qualification
41.	7 September 2025	Jassim Bin Hamad Stadium, Doha, Qatar	Russia	1–3	1–4	Friendly

== Honours ==
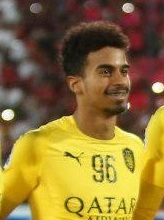
Afif in an Al Sadd line-up in 2018

Al Sadd

- Qatar Stars League: 2018–19, 2021, 2021–22, 2023–24, 2024–25, 2025–26
- Emir Cup: 2020, 2021, 2024
- Qatar Cup: 2020, 2021
- Sheikh Jassim Cup: 2019
- Qatari Stars Cup: 2020

Qatar

- AFC Asian Cup: 2019, 2023

Individual

- WAFF U-23 Championship Top goalscorer: 2015
- Qatar Stars League Top goalscorer: 2019–20, 2023–24
- Qatar Stars League Top assists provider: 2018–19, 2019–20
- Qatar Stars League Team of the Year: 2018–19, 2019–20, 2023–24
- Qatar Stars League Player of the Year : 2018–19, 2019–20, 2025–26
- Estad Doha Qatar Player of the Year: 2018, 2019
- AFC Asian Cup Team of the Tournament: 2019, 2023
- AFC Player of the Year: 2019, 2023
- IFFHS Asian Men's Team of the Year: 2020, 2024
- CONCACAF Gold Cup Best XI: 2021
- FIFA Arab Cup Bronze Ball: 2021
- FIFA Arab Cup Team of the Tournament: 2021
- AFC Asian Cup Golden Boot: 2023
- AFC Asian Cup Best Player: 2023
- Best Footballer in Asia: 2024

== See also ==
- List of men's footballers with 100 or more international caps
