= 2014 Thai Premier League =

Thai Premier League
- Season: 2014
- Champions: Buriram United; 4th Premier League title
- Relegated: Police United; PTT Rayong; Songkhla United; Air Force Central; Samut Songkhram
- Champions League: Buriram United (group stage); Bangkok Glass (qualifying play-off); Chonburi (qualifying play-off)
- Matches: 380
- Goals: 1,051 (2.77 per match)
- Top goalscorer: (Brazil) Heberty (26 goals)
- Biggest home win: Osotspa 7–0 Songkhla (5 April 2014); BEC Tero 7–0 Bangkok (27 April 2014)
- Biggest away win: Songkhram 0–5 Police (26 October 2014)
- Highest scoring: Sisaket 5–4 Air Force (22 October 2014)
- Longest winning run: 8 games Buriram United
- Longest unbeaten run: 22 games BEC Tero Sasana
- Longest winless run: 12 games Air Force Central
- Longest losing run: 6 games Samut Songkhram; TOT
- Highest attendance: 33,325; Buriram 0–0 Muangthong (10 May 2014)
- Average attendance: 5,029

The 2014 Thai Premier League (also known as Toyota Thai Premier League due to the sponsorship from Toyota) is the 18th season of the Thai Premier League since its establishment in 1996. A total of 20 teams are competing in the league. The season has begun on 22 February and will finish on 2 November.

Buriram United are the defending champions, having won their Thai Premier League title the previous season. Air Force Central, Singhtarua and PTT Rayong entered as the three promoted teams.

== Teams ==
A total of 20 teams will contest the league, including 17 sides from the 2013 season and three promoted from the 2013 Thai Division 1 League.

Pattaya United were relegated to the 2014 Thai Division 1 League after finishing the 2013 season. They were replaced by the best three teams from the 2013 Thai Division 1 League champions Air Force Central, runners-up Singhtarua and third place PTT Rayong.

=== Stadiums locations ===
Locations of the 2014 Thai Premier League teams
Football clubs in Bangkok Metropolitan Region

Note: Table lists in alphabetical order.

Team	Province	Stadium	Capacity	Ref.
Air Force Central	Pathumthani	Thupatemee Stadium	25,000	
Army United	Bangkok	Thai Army Sports Stadium	20,000	
Bangkok Glass	Pathumthani	Leo Stadium	13,000	
Bangkok United	Bangkok	Thai-Japanese Stadium	10,320	
BEC Tero Sasana	Bangkok	72-years Anniversary Stadium	10,000	
Buriram United	Buriram	I-Mobile Stadium	32,600	
Chainat Hornbill	Chainat	Chainat Stadium	12,000	
Chiangrai United	Chiangrai	United Stadium of Chiangrai	15,000	
Chonburi	Chonburi	Chonburi Stadium	8,500	
Muangthong United	Nonthaburi	SCG Stadium	15,000	
Osotspa Saraburi	Saraburi Bang Kapi, Bangkok; Pathum Wan, Bangkok	Saraburi Stadium^{1} Rajamangala Stadium; Thephasadin Stadium	6,000 49,722; 6,378	
Police United	Pathumthani	Thammasat Stadium	20,000	
PTT Rayong	Rayong	PTT Stadium	20,000	
Ratchaburi	Ratchaburi	Ratchaburi Stadium	10,000	
Samut Songkhram	Samut Songkhram Bangkok	Samut Songkhram Stadium^{2} Thai Army Sports Stadium	6,000 20,000	
Singhtarua	Bangkok	PAT Stadium	12,308	
Sisaket	Sisaket	Sri Nakhon Lamduan Stadium	10,000	
Songkhla United	Songkhla	Tinasulanon Stadium	35,000	
Suphanburi	Suphanburi	Suphanburi Province Stadium	18,000	
TOT	Bangkok	TOT Stadium Chaeng Watthana	5,000	

- ^{1} Osotspa Saraburi will use the Rajamangala Stadium as their temporary home whilst their home stadium, Saraburi Stadium's floodlights are upgraded.
- ^{2} Samut Songkhram used the Ratchaburi Stadium and Thai Army Sports Stadium until its floodlight is upgraded and the stadium is improved.

=== Personnel and sponsoring ===
Note: Flags indicate national team as has been defined under FIFA eligibility rules. Players may hold more than one non-FIFA nationality.

Team	Head coach	Captain	Kit manufacturer	Shirt sponsor
Air Force Central	(Thailand) Vitwarasak Uppathamnarakorn	(Thailand) Rungroj Sawangsri	KELA	Central
Army United	(England) Gary Stevens	(Thailand) Chaiwat Nak-iem	–	Chang
Bangkok Glass	(Thailand) Anurak Srikerd	(Thailand) Chatree Chimtalay	Nike	Leo Beer
Bangkok United	(Brazil) Alexandré Pölking	(Thailand) Wittaya Madlam	Ari Football	True
BEC Tero Sasana	(Brazil) José Alves Borges	(Thailand) Rangsan Viwatchaichok	FBT	FB Battery
Buriram United	(Brazil) Alexandre Gama	(Thailand) Suchao Nutnum	–	Chang
Chainat Hornbill	(Thailand) Jadet Meelarp	(Thailand) Sumanya Purisai	Kappa	–
Chiangrai United	(Thailand) Teerasak Po-on	(Thailand) Pichitphong Choeichiu	–	Leo Beer
Chonburi	(Japan) Masahiro Wada	(Thailand) Pipob On-Mo	Nike	Chang
Muangthong United	(Croatia) Dragan Talajić	(Thailand) Datsakorn Thonglao	Grand Sport	SCG
Osotspa Saraburi	(Brazil) Stefano Cugurra	(Thailand) Jetsada Puanakunmee	Grand Sport	M-150
Police United	(Thailand) Attaphol Buspakom	(Thailand) Surachart Sareepim	Mizuno	Promise
PTT Rayong	(Thailand) Phayong Khunnaen	(Thailand) Yuttana Chaikaew	Pan	PTT Group
Ratchaburi	(Spain) Ricardo Rodríguez	(Ivory Coast) Henri Jöel	Mizuno	Mitr Phol
Samut Songkhram	(Thailand) Suksan Khunsut	(Madagascar) Guy Hubert	Kool Sport	GSE
Singhtarua	(Thailand) Dusit Chalermsan	(Thailand) Kiatjarern Ruangparn	Mizuno	PAT
Sisaket	(Thailand) Chalermwoot Sa-Ngapol	(Thailand) Sarayuth Chaikamdee	Joma	Muang Thai
Songkhla United	(England) Jason Withe	(Thailand) Chairat Madsiri	FBT	I-Mobile
Suphanburi	(Bulgaria) Velizar Popov	(Thailand) Panupong Wongsa	Grand Sport	Chang
TOT	(Thailand) Somchai Subpherm	(Thailand) Patiparn Phetphun	–	TOT

=== Managerial changes ===
Team	Outgoing manager	Manner of departure	Date of vacancy	Table	Incoming manager	Date of appointment
Chonburi	(Thailand) Withaya Laohakul	Moved to technical director	24 October 2013	Pre-season	(Japan) Masahiro Wada	2 December 2013
PTT Rayong	(Thailand) Nopporn Eksrattra	End of Contract	3 November 2013	Pre-season	(England) Peter Withe	1 December 2013
Chiangrai United	(Thailand) Anurak Srikerd	End of Contract	4 November 2013	Pre-season	(Thailand) Teerasak Po-on	23 November 2013
Muangthong United	(Belgium) René Desaeyere	End of Contract	4 November 2013	Pre-season	(England) Scott Cooper	2 January 2014
Songkhla United	(Thailand) Sampan Yotatip (Thailand) Pitaya Pimanmaen	End of caretaker role	4 November 2013	Pre-season	(Thailand) Phayong Khunnaen	3 January 2014
Suphanburi	(Thailand) Phayong Khunnaen	End of Contract	6 November 2013	Pre-season	(Brazil) Alexandré Pölking	2 January 2014
Army United	(Brazil) Alexandré Pölking	End of Contract	9 November 2013	Pre-season	(Scotland) Matt Elliott	7 December 2013
Ratchaburi	(Spain) Iván Palanco	Sacked	24 December 2013	Pre-season	(Spain) Ricardo Rodríguez	19 January 2014
Police United	(Thailand) T. Damrong-Ongtrakul	Move to manager	20 January 2014	Pre-season	(Brazil) Carlos Roberto	20 January 2014
Bangkok United	(Thailand) Sasom Pobprasert	Sacked	20 January 2014	Pre-season	(Portugal) Rui Bento	21 January 2014
Muangthong United	(England) Scott Cooper	Mutual consent	30 March 2014	4th	(Croatia) Dragan Talajić	2 July 2014
Samut Songkhram	(Thailand) Somchai Chuayboonchum	Resigned	30 March 2014	20th	(Thailand) Paiboon Lertvimonrut	12 April 2014
Buriram United	(Spain) Alejandro Menéndez	Resigned	11 April 2014	12th	(Serbia) Božidar Bandović	11 April 2014
Air Force Central	(Thailand) Narasak Boonkleng	Resigned	12 April 2014	19th	(Thailand) V. Uppathamnarakorn	6 June 2014
Bangkok United	(Portugal) Rui Bento	Sacked	13 April 2014	18th	(Thailand) T. Damrong-Ongtrakul	13 April 2014
Police United	(Brazil) Carlos Roberto	Sacked	23 April 2014	17th	(Finland) Mika Lönnström	24 April 2014
Suphanburi	(Brazil) Alexandré Pölking	Sacked	12 May 2014	9th	(Bulgaria) Velizar Popov	8 June 2014
PTT Rayong	(England) Peter Withe	Sacked	29 May 2014	18th	(Thailand) Chaiyong Khumpiam	17 June 2014
Buriram United	(Serbia) Božidar Bandović	Sacked	7 June 2014	3rd	(Brazil) Alexandre Gama	8 June 2014
Osotspa Saraburi	(Thailand) Chalermwoot Sa-Ngapol	Resigned	12 June 2014	12th	(Brazil) Stefano Cugurra	17 July 2014
Bangkok Glass	(Thailand) Attaphol Buspakom	Sacked	16 June 2014	10th	(Thailand) Anurak Srikerd	19 June 2014
Police United	(Finland) Mika Lönnström	Mutual consent	21 June 2014	12th	(Thailand) T. Damrong-Ongtrakul	23 June 2014
Chainat Hornbill	(Thailand) Surachai Jaturapattarapong	Resigned	21 June 2014	15th	(Thailand) Jadet Meelarp	22 June 2014
Sisaket	(Thailand) Paniphon Kerdyam	Resigned	21 June 2014	17th	(Thailand) Chalermwoot Sa-Ngapol	27 June 2014
Bangkok United	(Thailand) T. Damrong-Ongtrakul	Signed by Police United	22 June 2014	16th	(Brazil) Alexandré Pölking	23 June 2014
Army United	(Scotland) Matt Elliott	Signed by Leicester City	26 June 2014	11th	(England) Gary Stevens	30 July 2014
Songkhla United	(Thailand) Phayong Khunnaen	Resigned	16 July 2014	17th	(England) Jason Withe	29 July 2014
Samut Songkhram	(Thailand) Paiboon Lertvimonrut	Resigned	22 July 2014	20th	(Thailand) Suksan Khunsut	29 July 2014
Police United	(Thailand) T. Damrong-Ongtrakul	Sacked	5 August 2014	16th	(Thailand) Attaphol Buspakom	5 August 2014
PTT Rayong	(Thailand) Chaiyong Khumpiam	Sacked	6 August 2014	19th	(Thailand) Phayong Khunnaen	6 August 2014

=== Foreign players ===
The number of foreign players is restricted to seven per TPL team, but only five of them can be on the game sheet in each game. A team can use four foreign players on the field in each game, including at least one player from the AFC country.

Club	Player 1	Player 2	Player 3	Player 4	Player 5	Player 6	Asian Player	Former Players
Air Force Central	(Ghana) Isaac Honny	(Ivory Coast) Yao Hermann	(Portugal) Zezinando	(South Korea) Lee Jin-Ho	–	–	(South Korea) Bang Seung-Hwan	(England) Lee Tuck (Nigeria) Ajoku Obinna (Slovakia) Jozef Tirer (South Korea) Whoo Hyun
Army United	(Brazil) Luizinho	(Brazil) Raphael Botti	(Brazil) Wellington Priori	(France) Goran Jerković	(Japan) Yuji Funayama	(Slovakia) Zdenko Kaprálik	(South Korea) Lee Hyun-Jin	(Brazil) Alessandro Alves (Japan) Masahito Noto
Bangkok Glass	(France) Flavien Michelini	(Georgia (country)) Zourab Tsiskaridze	(Japan) Goshi Okubo	(North Macedonia) Blaže Ilioski	(North Macedonia) Darko Tasevski	(Namibia) Lazarus Kaimbi	(Japan) Teruyuki Moniwa	(Costa Rica) José Mena
Bangkok United	(Brazil) Leandro Tatu	(France) Romain Gasmi	(Mali) Kalifa Cissé	(Serbia) Miloš Bogunović	(Zimbabwe) Mike Temwanjera	–	(South Korea) Kim Yoo-Jin	(Timor-Leste) Alan Leandro (Croatia) Antun Palić
BEC Tero Sasana	(Algeria) Otman Djellilahine	(Democratic Republic of the Congo) Bukasa Kasongo	(Ghana) Gilbert Koomson	(Honduras) Georgie Welcome	(Japan) Sho Shimoji	(Montenegro) Radomir Đalović	(Japan) Daiki Iwamasa	(Guadeloupe) Thomas Gamiette (Nigeria) Kelechi Osunwa
Buriram United	(Brazil) Lúcio Maranhão	(Spain) Carmelo González	(Spain) David Rochela	(Venezuela) Andrés Túñez	–	–	(Philippines) Javier Patiño	(Argentina) Leandro Torres (Argentina) Leonel Altobelli (England) Jay Simpson (Japan) Kai Hirano
Chainat Hornbill	(Cameroon) Jules Baga	(Cameroon) Valery Hiek	(North Macedonia) Borce Manevski	(Montenegro) Nikola Nikezić	(South Korea) Jo Tae-Keun	(Trinidad and Tobago) Seon Power	(South Korea) Park Jung-Soo	(Serbia) Marko Perović
Chiangrai United	(Brazil) Fernando Abreu	(Brazil) Leandro Assumpção	(Brazil) Renan Marques	(Brazil) Uilian Souza	(Japan) Keisuke Ogawa	(Japan) Keita Sugimoto	(Japan) Kazuki Murakami	(Brazil) Jerri (Brazil) Leonardo
Chonburi	(Brazil) Anderson	(Brazil) Andre Araujo	(Brazil) Juliano Mineiro	(Ivory Coast) Fodé Diakité	(Japan) Yuki Bamba	(Timor-Leste) Thiago Cunha	(Japan) Kazuto Kushida	(Brazil) Jaime Bragança (Japan) Hayato Hashimoto
Muangthong United	(Brazil) Cleiton Silva	(England) Jay Bothroyd	(North Macedonia) Mario Gjurovski	(Serbia) Milan Bubalo	(Spain) Aritz Borda	(Australia) Erik Paartalu	(South Korea) Kim Dong-Jin	(Ivory Coast) Dagno Siaka (North Korea) Ri Kwang-chon
Osotspa Saraburi	(Brazil) Aron da Silva	(Brazil) Jeferson	(Cameroon) William Modibo	(Curaçao) Shelton Martis	(Ivory Coast) Anthony Komenan	(Namibia) Tangeni Shipahu	(Japan) Hiromichi Katano	-
Police United	(Cameroon) Dooh Moukoko	(France) Michaël Murcy	(Ivory Coast) Dango Siaka	(Netherlands) Adnan Barakat	(Spain) Sergio Suárez	(South Korea) Kim Tae-Min	(Japan) Norihiro Nishi	(Brazil) Dudu (Slovenia) Matej Rapnik
PTT Rayong	(Australia) Matt Thompson	(Australia) Trent McClenahan	(Ivory Coast) Amadou Ouattara	(Haiti) Yves Desmarets	(Spain) Rafael Wellington	(Spain) Rufo Sánchez	(Australia) Michael Beauchamp	(England) Rohan Ricketts (South Korea) Lee Soung-yong
Ratchaburi	(Brazil) Douglas	(Brazil) Fábio Lopes	(Brazil) Heberty	(Ivory Coast) Henri Jöel	(South Korea) Jang Gil-Hyeok	(Spain) Juan Quero	(Japan) Genki Nagasato	(Brazil) John César (Montenegro) Andrija Delibašić (Spain) Óscar Pérez
Samut Songkhram	(Haiti) Pascal Millien	(Ivory Coast) Koné Seydou	(Japan) Yusuke Kato	(Madagascar) Guy Hubert	(Nigeria) Samuel Ajayi	–	(South Korea) Kim Tae-youn	(Brazil) Erikson Noguchipinto (Japan) Yutaka Tahara (Russia) Rod Dyachenko
Singhtarua	(Brazil) Leandro	(Nigeria) Ikechukwu Kalu	(Serbia) Predrag Sikimić	(South Korea) Joo Sung-Hwan	(South Korea) Kim Geun-Chul	(South Korea) Lee Sang-Ho	(Japan) Hironori Saruta	(Equatorial Guinea) Thierry Fidjeu (South Korea) Lim Hyun-woo
Sisaket	(Argentina) Lucas Daniel	(Brazil) David Bala	(Brazil) Victor Amaro	(Ghana) Godwin Antwi	(Japan) Terukazu Tanaka	(Spain) Gorka Unda	(Australia) Brent McGrath	(North Korea) Pak Nam-Chol (Spain) Albert Manteca
Songkhla United	(Afghanistan) Faysal Shayesteh	(Brazil) Renan Silva	(Denmark) Sebastian Svärd	(North Macedonia) Muzafer Ejupi	(New Zealand) Kayne Vincent	(Serbia) Darko Rakočević	(South Korea) Ahn Byung-keon	(Netherlands) Adnan Barakat (South Korea) Kim Tae-Young
Suphanburi	(Brazil) Márcio Rosário	(Germany) Björn Lindemann	(Ivory Coast) Bireme Diouf	(Japan) Robert Cullen	(Montenegro) Dragan Boškovic	(South Korea) Jung Myung-Oh	(Indonesia) Sergio van Dijk	(Brazil) Luizinho (Cameroon) Njie divine
TOT	(Brazil) Alex Ruela	(England) Bas Savage	(Ivory Coast) Mohamed Koné	(South Korea) Gong Young-Sun	(South Korea) Ko Ki-Gu	(South Korea) Lee Jun-Ki	(Japan) Takahiro Kawamura	(South Korea) Lee Han-guk

== League table ==
Pos	Team	Pld	W	D	L	GF	GA	GD	Pts	Qualification or relegation
1	Buriram United (C)	38	23	10	5	69	26	+43	79	2015 AFC Champions League group stage
2	Chonburi	38	21	13	4	62	33	+29	76	2015 AFC Champions League Qualifying play-off (Note: Bangkok Glass, the winners of the 2014 Thai FA Cup also qualify for the play-off of the 2015 AFC Champions League.)
3	BEC Tero Sasana	38	18	14	6	66	41	+25	68	
4	Ratchaburi	38	17	14	7	62	42	+20	65	
5	Muangthong United	38	20	11	7	66	36	+30	62 (Note: Muangthong United and Singhtarua a nine-point deduction following a fight between their fans.)	
6	Suphanburi	38	17	8	13	55	49	+6	59	
7	Chiangrai United	38	13	16	9	55	47	+8	55	
8	Bangkok United	38	15	9	14	55	56	−1	54	
9	Army United	38	14	11	13	52	55	−3	53	
10	Bangkok Glass	38	14	7	17	70	65	+5	49	2015 AFC Champions League Qualifying play-off
11	Osotspa Saraburi	38	11	15	12	53	49	+4	48	
12	Sisaket	38	12	10	16	48	59	−11	46	
13	Singhtarua	38	15	9	14	44	52	−8	45	
14	Chainat Hornbill	38	10	14	14	43	50	−7	44	
15	TOT	38	10	13	15	38	51	−13	43 (Note: TOT 3–1 POL; POL 2–2 TOT)	
16	Police United (R)	38	11	10	17	58	64	−6	43	Relegation to the Thai Division 1 League
17	PTT Rayong (R)	38	10	12	16	49	60	−11	42	Relegation to the Thai Division 1 League
18	Songkhla United (R)	38	8	8	22	39	72	−33	32	Relegation to the Thai Division 1 League
19	Air Force Central (R)	38	6	12	20	35	63	−28	30	Relegation to the Thai Division 1 League
20	Samut Songkhram (R)	38	5	4	29	32	81	−49	19	Relegation to the Thai Division 1 League

Updated to match(es) played on 2 November 2014. Source: Thai Premier League
Rules for classification: 1) points; 2) head-to-head points; 3) head-to-head goal difference; 4) goal difference; 5) number of goals scored
(C) Champions; (R) Relegated

== Results ==
Home \ Away	AFA	ARM	BKG	BKU	BEC	BRU	CHA	CRU	CHO	MTU	OSO	POL	PTT	RAT	SAS	SIH	SIS	SON	SUP	TOT
Air Force Central		1–1	2–3	4–3	0–0	0–2	0–0	1–0	1–3	0–1	0–0	1–1	2–2	1–2	0–1	1–1	2–0	1–1	2–0	0–0
Army United	2–0		2–1	2–1	0–1	2–2	1–1	3–1	1–0	1–2	2–0	1–0	2–0	2–1	4–2	1–2	2–2	2–1	0–4	1–1
Bangkok Glass	2–0	2–3		1–1	2–1	3–0	4–1	0–2	0–2	2–1	2–2	1–2	5–2	2–4	1–0	2–3	2–1	2–3	1–1	6–1
Bangkok United	3–0	3–0	1–0		0–0	2–0	0–0	0–0	2–0	1–3	2–1	0–1	2–2	1–0	2–1	2–2	1–2	5–2	2–3	2–0
BEC Tero Sasana	0–0	2–1	1–1	7–0		3–2	2–1	1–1	1–1	1–1	0–0	5–2	2–1	1–2	2–0	3–1	2–1	2–0	4–2	1–1
Buriram United	2–0	1–1	3–1	3–0	1–1		3–1	5–0	2–0	0–0	2–2	2–1	2–0	0–0	1–1	2–0	2–0	3–0	4–0	3–0
Chainat Hornbill	1–3	2–0	3–2	1–1	2–3	0–3		0–0	1–1	0–0	1–1	1–1	2–0	2–2	3–1	0–1	1–1	1–0	0–1	2–0
Chiangrai United	2–0	1–1	0–2	3–0	2–1	1–1	3–2		1–1	2–2	2–0	2–0	2–0	3–3	4–2	0–0	1–1	0–0	2–0	1–1
Chonburi	2–0	1–0	3–2	4–2	1–0	1–0	1–1	2–1		2–0	2–1	4–0	1–0	3–3	4–0	1–1	2–1	2–0	0–0	1–1
Muangthong United	3–1	0–0	2–1	2–3	0–1	0–1	2–1	2–1	1–0		2–2	1–1	3–0	1–2	3–0	3–1	0–0	2–0	2–5	1–0
Osotspa Saraburi	3–2	2–0	1–1	1–2	0–0	0–2	1–1	3–3	0–1	0–2		3–3	1–1	1–1	2–1	0–1	0–1	7–0	1–0	1–1
Police United	5–1	1–3	3–3	0–0	1–1	0–2	1–2	4–3	2–3	1–2	1–2		1–0	1–2	1–2	3–0	2–2	2–4	3–1	2–2
PTT Rayong	1–1	2–1	2–1	1–1	2–2	1–1	2–0	2–2	2–2	1–4	2–1	3–1		0–1	3–2	1–2	2–4	4–0	0–1	1–1
Ratchaburi	2–0	3–0	3–2	3–0	1–2	0–2	1–1	2–2	1–3	2–2	1–2	0–1	3–2		3–1	0–0	0–0	1–0	3–0	1–0
Samut Songkhram	4–0	2–2	0–2	0–2	0–0	0–1	0–3	1–1	1–2	2–4	0–2	0–5	0–1	0–4		0–3	0–1	0–1	1–3	1–2
Singhtarua	1–2	1–0	2–1	0–3	1–3	1–0	1–2	2–1	1–3	0–4	0–0	0–1	1–1	2–2	3–0		3–1	2–1	1–0	0–2
Sisaket	5–4	4–2	3–4	1–3	3–2	1–3	2–0	0–1	0–0	1–1	0–1	1–0	0–0	0–0	2–1	0–1		3–2	1–5	1–0
Songkhla United	1–1	1–1	1–2	1–0	3–4	2–3	1–0	2–1	1–1	0–4	0–2	1–1	1–2	1–1	1–2	2–2	2–1		3–2	0–1
Suphanburi	1–0	1–1	2–0	3–2	2–3	1–1	2–0	0–2	1–1	0–0	3–1	0–2	1–0	1–2	2–1	2–1	2–0	1–0		1–1
TOT	2–1	0–1	1–1	2–0	2–1	0–2	2–3	0–1	1–1	0–3	1–3	3–1	1–3	0–0	1–2	2–0	3–1	1–0	1–1	

Updated to match(es) played on 2 November 2014. Source: Thai Premier League
Legend: Blue = home team win; Yellow = draw; Red = away team win.

== Season statistics ==
=== Top scorers ===
As of 2 November 2014.

Rank	Player	Club	Goals
1	(Brazil) Heberty	Ratchaburi	26
2	(Philippines) Javier Patiño	Buriram United	21
3	(Timor-Leste) Thiago Cunha	Chonburi	20
4	(Germany) Björn Lindemann	Suphanburi	18
5	(Japan) Sho Shimoji	BEC Tero Sasana	17
5	(Brazil) Renan Marques	Chiangrai United	17
7	(Brazil) Aron da Silva	Osotspa Saraburi	15
8	(Brazil) Leandro Assumpção	Chiangrai United	14
9	(Ivory Coast) Kouassi Yao Hermann	Air Force Central	13
9	(North Macedonia) Mario Gjurovski	Muangthong United	13
9	(Spain) Carmelo González	Buriram United	13

=== Top assists ===
As of 2 November 2014.

Rank	Player	Club	Assists
1	(Ghana) Gilbert Koomson	BEC Tero Sasana	11
2	(North Macedonia) Darko Tasevski	Bangkok Glass	10
2	(Thailand) Theeraton Bunmathan	Buriram United	10
4	(Thailand) Rangsan Viwatchaichok	BEC Tero Sasana	9
4	(Thailand) Datsakorn Thonglao	Muangthong United	9
4	(Thailand) Pakorn Prempak	Police United	9
7	(North Macedonia) Mario Gjurovski	Muangthong United	8
7	(Thailand) Teeratep Winothai	Police United	8
7	(Japan) Hironori Saruta	Singhtarua	8
10	(Spain) Rufo Sánchez	PTT Rayong	7

=== Hat-tricks ===
Player	For	Against	Result	Date
(Ivory Coast) Anthony Komenan	Osotspa Saraburi	Songkhla United	7–0	5 April 2014
(Thailand) Pichet In-bang	Sisaket	Bangkok Glass	3–4	20 April 2014
(Ivory Coast) Amadou Ouattara	PTT Rayong	Songkhla United	4–0	1 June 2014
(Brazil) Heberty	Ratchaburi	Bangkok Glass	4–2	1 June 2014
(Ivory Coast) Kouassi Yao Hermann	Air Force Central	Chainat Hornbill	3–1	21 June 2014
(Ivory Coast) Anthony Komenan	Osotspa Saraburi	Army United	5–3	22 June 2014
(Philippines) Javier Patiño	Buriram United	Suphanburi	4–0	2 August 2014
(Thailand) Sarayuth Chaikamdee	Sisaket	BEC Tero Sasana	3–2	3 August 2014
(Haiti) Pascal Millien	Samut Songkhram	Air Force Central	4–0	10 August 2014
(Namibia) Lazarus Kaimbi	Bangkok Glass	TOT	6–1	23 August 2014
(Germany) Björn Lindemann	Suphanburi	Bangkok United	3–2	18 October 2014

== Awards ==
=== Monthly awards ===
Month	Coach of the Month		Player of the Month	
Month	Coach	Club	Player	Club
March	(Spain) Ricardo Rodríguez	Ratchaburi	(Brazil) Leandro	Singhtarua
April	(Thailand) Phon Chomchearn	Muangthong United	(North Macedonia) Mario Gjurovski	Muangthong United
May	(Brazil) José Alves Borges	BEC Tero Sasana	(Thailand) Mongkol Tossakrai	Army United
June	(Thailand) Dusit Chalermsan	Singhtarua	(Thailand) Jakkaphan Kaewprom	Buriram United
July	(Japan) Masahiro Wada	Chonburi	(Thailand) Sintaweechai Hathairattanakool	Chonburi
August	(Japan) Masahiro Wada	Chonburi	(Brazil) Heberty	Ratchaburi
October	(Thailand) Somchai Subpherm	TOT	(Thailand) Suchao Nuchnum	Buriram United

=== Annual awards ===
==== Player of the Year ====
The Player of the Year was awarded to Suchao Nuchnum.

==== Coach of the Year ====
The Coach of the Year was awarded to Masahiro Wada.

==== Golden Boot ====
The Golden Boot of the Year was awarded to Heberty.

==== Fair Play ====
The Fair Play of the Year was awarded to Songkhla United.

== Attendances ==
Pos	Team	Total	High	Low	Average	Change
1	Buriram United	363,514	33,325	2,261	19,132	+1.0%
2	Suphanburi	183,943	15,679	4,012	9,681	−32.4%
3	Muangthong United	180,933	14,950	1,419	9,522	−12.5%
4	Chiangrai United	131,320	14,125	3,096	6,911	−9.0%
5	Bangkok Glass	123,570	13,082	4,967	6,503	−12.4%
6	Chonburi	114,595	8,400	3,640	6,031	−0.8%
7	Ratchaburi	93,046	10,294	3,446	4,897	+30.1%
8	Sisaket	83,472	7,683	3,264	4,393	−12.1%
9	PTT Rayong	79,089	7,333	2,133	4,162	+1.8%^{†}
10	Chainat Hornbill	71,890	6,797	2,689	3,783	−3.9%
11	BEC Tero Sasana	70,313	6,770	2,236	3,700	−10.2%
12	Singhtarua	66,834	5,800	0	3,517	+38.8%^{†}
13	Songkhla United	57,847	12,700	1,194	3,044	−48.4%
14	Air Force Central	57,034	6,608	1,268	3,001	+5.4%^{†}
15	Police United	49,787	6,554	869	2,620	−30.0%
16	Bangkok United	49,136	4,025	1,236	2,586	−9.8%
17	Army United	47,017	7,401	1,344	2,474	−50.1%
18	Osotspa Saraburi	36,178	5,221	853	1,904	−46.1%
19	TOT	29,979	3,350	675	1,577	−3.7%
20	Samut Songkhram	21,780	2,925	330	1,146	−41.6%
	League total	1,911,277	33,325	0	5,029	−17.5%

Updated to games played on 2 November 2014
Source: Thai Premier League
Notes:
^{†} Teams played previous season in Division 1

== See also ==
- 2014 Thai Division 1 League
- 2014 Regional League Division 2
- 2014 Thai FA Cup
- 2014 Thai League Cup
- 2014 Kor Royal Cup
- Thai Premier League All-Star Football
