= Jumpasri United F.C. =

Thai football club

Jumpasri United จัมปาศรี ยูไนเต็ด
- Full name: Jumpasri United Football Club สโมสรฟุตบอลจัมปาศรี ยูไนเต็ด
- Nicknames: Ancient City (เมืองเก่า)
- Short name: JUFC
- Founded: 2018; 8 years ago
- Ground: Mahasarakham Province Stadium; Maha Sarakham, Thailand
- Capacity: 3,000
- Chairman: Udomsak Pedkamp
- Head Coach: vacant
- League: Thailand Amateur League
Home colours	Away colours

Jumpasri United (formerly Osotspa Samut Prakan; Thai: สโมสรฟุตบอลจัมปาศรี ยูไนเต็ด) is a Thai football club based in Mahasarakham. Previously the club is known as was founded in 1977 under the name Osotspa F.C. in association with the company Osotspa, known for its energy drink M-15 which previously played in the Thai League 1. The club appeared in the AFC Cup 2007, the Asian equivalent of the UEFA Europa League, and played its final group match against Singapore Tampines Rovers on 22 May 2007 at the Thai Army Sports Stadium.

In 2017, Super Power Samut Prakan leaving Samut Prakan Province and move to Maha Sarakham Province by merging with Jumpasri United in which they took on the club name revamping them to a pink home kit and pink crest. This moving was off the legend Osotspa Football Club or Super Power Samut Prakan one of the longest established football club in Thailand since 1977 with financial problems and sponsor support issues.

== History ==
=== Early years ===
The club was founded in 1977 under the name Osotspa F.C. in association with the company Osotspa, known for its energy drink M-150. Since 2006, the club used the nickname M-150th, and is sponsored by the company. Both the club and the company share the same logo. The team has adopted the yellow and red colours of its main sponsor, M-150, and wears yellow shirts with red trim and red shorts and socks.

=== 1996–2000 ===
The history and achievements of Osotspa go hand in hand with the coach Chatchai Paholpat, who held the position of manager at the club between 1996 and 2007. All achievements of the association were achieved under his leadership. The club participated in the 1996–97 season in the first edition of the Thai League T1. However, they could not hold off relegation, and fell to the newly founded Thai Division 1 League. They finished second in this league and fought in the play-offs for promotion to the Royal Police United from the first division. After the round of matches, Osotspa defeated Police and the club returned to the top league. Since their re-emergence in 1997, the club has become an integral part of the Premier League. In 1999 they reached the final of the Thai FA Cup collect, but were beaten 2–1 by Bangkok Bank at Supachalasai Stadium.

=== 2000–2006 ===
The club achieved respectable fourth and eighth-place finishes in the following seasons of the league. 2002 marked the most successful season in the club's history; Osotspa finished runners-up in the league, qualified for the AFC Champions League and won for the first time the Queen's Cup.

In the 2002–03 AFC Champions League season, Osotspa achieved a 7–4 aggregate victory over the Churchill Brothers to qualify for the competition proper. However, Osotspa struggled in the group stages, and were eliminated with zero points from three games and a goal difference of 1:20. The club finished the following 2003–04 and 2004–05 seasons in third place. They successfully defended their Queen's Cup title on both occasions, to make it three consecutive victories in the competition. Osotspa were again only runners-up in 2006, but once again qualified for the Champions League. At the end of the season the longtime coach Chatchai Paholpat left the club.

=== 2007–2016 ===
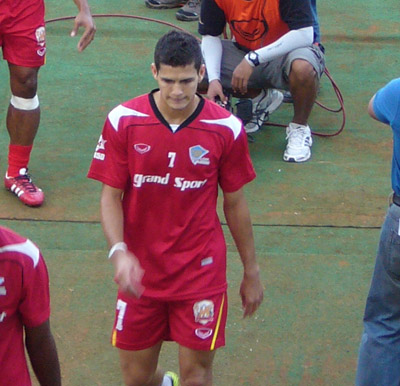
Cleiton Silva is the top goalscorers of the club in the modern age

Osotspa M-150 took part in the 2007 AFC Cup under new manager Arjhan Srong-ngamsub. They were again eliminated at the group stage, but with much-improved results – a close third with 10 points. They could not emulate such form in the league, however, finishing a disappointing 9th, 23 points behind winners Chonburi, followed by 4th the following year.

In the middle of 2009, Osotspa relocated to Saraburi Province and changed its name to Osotspa M-150 Saraburi F.C.

In 2010 the club signed Pairoj Borwonwatanadilok as their new coach. Under him, Osotspa came 7th 2010 season, 6th in 2011 season and 5th 2012 season in his three-season long tenure.

In 2013, after Pairoj's contract ended, the club replaced him with former Pattaya United coach Chalermwoot Sa-Ngapol.

In the 2015 season, Osotspa relocated from Saraburi Province back to Bangkok and used Rajamangala National Stadium as their home venue. In the late of the season, the club relocated from Bangkok to Samut Prakan Province and renamed to Osotspa M-150 Samut Prakan F.C..

In the middle of 2016 season, Osotspa Co., Ltd. made the change in their parent organization. They decided to expel their football section and establish independence authority. Super Power Football Venture has become the owner of Osotspa football club and rebranded it to Super Power Samut Prakan F.C.

=== Takeover ===
In October 2016, Samut Sakhon Football Venture who owns Samut Sakhon F.C. in Thai Regional League Division 2 attempted to buy the majority share of the club. The new owner aimed to rebrand the club to Samut Sakhon City Power F.C. and relocate it to Samut Sakhon Province. However, the takeover has been blocked by Football Association of Thailand since it against the club licensing rules of Asian Football Federation. After the later discussion, the takeover was collapsed and the club decided to stay in Samut Prakan. In July 2017, The club was complete to takeover by Pakorn Khlaiphet Phetchaburi businessman and he became new club chairman.

==== Merge with Jumpasri United, relocation and renaming ====
In the end of season 2017, the club announced its intent to relocate to Maha Sarakham Province and merge with Jumpasri United, the club that played at that time in Thailand Amateur League and moved ground to Mahasarakham Province Stadium after receiving permission to do so from Football Association of Thailand. The club started having problems after Osotspa discontinue support and financial problems happened. After relocating to Maha Sarakham Province, for this reason, the legend Osotspa Football Club or Super Power Samut Prakan one of the longest established football club in Thailand since 1977 has officially ended at the end of season 2017.

In the end of season 2017, Super Power Samut Prakan announced its intent to relocate to Maha Sarakham Province and merge with Jumpasri United, the club that played at that time in Thailand Amateur League and moved ground to Mahasarakham Province Stadium after receiving permission to do so from Football Association of Thailand.

In 2018, Club-licensing of this team didn't pass to play 2018 Thai League 2. This team is banned 2 years and Relegated to the 2020 Thai League 4 North Eastern Region.

== Stadium and locations ==
Coordinates	Location	Stadium	Year
16°09′15″N 103°18′59″E	Maha Sarakham	Mahasarakham Province Stadium	2018

== Season by season record ==
Season	League									FA Cup	League Cup	Top goalscorer	
Season	Division	P	W	D	L	F	A	Pts	Pos	FA Cup	League Cup	Name	Goals
2017	TA North-East	5	1	2	2	8	10	5	9th – 10th	Not Enter	Can't Enter	Kittipong Darangwan; Jariya Bomtakhu	2
2018	TA North-East	1	0	0	1	1	4	0	32nd	QR	Can't Enter	none	0
2019	TA North-East	3	2	0	1	8	4	6	14th	Not Enter	Can't Enter		

Champions	Runners-up	Promoted	Relegated

- P = Played
- W = Games won
- D = Games drawn
- L = Games lost
- F = Goals for
- A = Goals against
- Pts = Points
- Pos = Final position
- N/A = No answer
- TA = Thailand Amateur League
- QR1 = First Qualifying Round
- QR2 = Second Qualifying Round
- QR3 = Third Qualifying Round
- QR4 = Fourth Qualifying Round
- RInt = Intermediate Round
- R1 = Round 1
- R2 = Round 2
- R3 = Round 3
- R4 = Round 4
- R5 = Round 5
- R6 = Round 6
- GR = Group stage
- QF = Quarter-finals
- SF = Semi-finals
- RU = Runners-up
- S = Shared
- W = Winners

== Achievements ==
- Thai League 1:

Runner-up: 2002, 2006

- Queen's Cup:

Champions: 2002, 2003, 2004

- Thailand FA Cup:

Runners-up: 1999

- Thai League Cup:

Champions: 1990

- Kor Royal Cup:

Champions: 2001, 2006

== Performance in AFC competitions ==
- AFC Champions League: 1 appearance

2002–03: Group Stage

- AFC Cup: 1 appearance

2007: Group Stage

Season	Competition	Round		Club	Home	Away
2002–03	AFC Champions League	Qualifying Zone 2 (East)/Round 2	(Indonesia)	Persita Tangerang	0–0	1–0
		Qualifying Zone 2 (East)/Round 3	(India)	Churchill Brothers	6–3	1–1
		Group stage	(South Korea)	Seongnam Ilhwa Chunma		6–0
		Group stage	(China)	Dalian Shide		7–1
		Group stage	(Japan)	Shimizu S-Pulse		7–0
2007	AFC Cup	Group stage	(Malaysia)	Pahang FA	4–0	0–4
		Group stage	(Singapore)	Tampines Rovers	3–0	2–1
		Group stage	(India)	Mohun Bagan	0–0	1–0

== Stadium and locations ==
Coordinates	Location	Stadium	Year
13°46′41″N 100°38′42″E	Bang Kapi, Bangkok	Klong Chan Sports Center	2007-2008
13°55′10″N 100°41′25″E	Pathum Thani	Thanarom Village Football Field	2009
14°33′24″N 100°54′17″E	Saraburi	Saraburi Stadium	2010-2013
13°45′20″N 100°37′20″E	Bang Kapi, Bangkok	Rajamangala Stadium	2014
13°44′44″N 100°31′39″E	Pathum Wan, Bangkok	Thephasadin Stadium	2014
13°45′20″N 100°37′20″E	Bang Kapi, Bangkok	Rajamangala Stadium	2015
13°34′46″N 100°47′40″E	Samut Prakan	Samut Prakarn SAT Stadium (Keha Bang Phli)	2016–2017

== Season by season record ==
Season	League									FA Cup	League Cup	Queen'sCup	Kor RoyalCup	AFC Champions League	AFC Cup	Top scorer	
Season	Division	P	W	D	L	F	A	Pts	Pos	FA Cup	League Cup	Queen'sCup	Kor RoyalCup	AFC Champions League	AFC Cup	Name	Goals
1996–97	TPL	34	8	10	16	41	73	34	14th	—N/a	—N/a	—N/a	–	–	–	—N/a	—N/a
1997	DIV 1	—N/a	—N/a	—N/a	—N/a	—N/a	—N/a	—N/a	—N/a	2nd	—N/a	—N/a	–	–	–	—N/a	—N/a
1998	TPL	22	4	9	9	22	47	21	10th	—N/a	—N/a	–	–	–	–	—N/a	—N/a
1999	TPL	22	10	9	3	32	21	39	4th	RU	—N/a	—N/a	–	–	–	—N/a	—N/a
2000	TPL	22	6	8	8	15	20	26	8th	—N/a	—N/a	—N/a	–	–	–	—N/a	—N/a
2001–02	TPL	22	13	5	4	34	21	44	2nd	—N/a	—N/a	–	–	–	–	—N/a	—N/a
2002–03	TPL	18	5	8	5	19	17	23	6th	–	—N/a	W	W	–	–	—N/a	—N/a
2003–04	TPL	18	10	3	5	43	23	33	3rd	–	—N/a	W	–	GR	–	Vimol Jankam	14
2004–05	TPL	18	9	5	4	34	20	32	3rd	–	—N/a	W	–	–	–	Sarayoot Chaikamdee	10
2006	TPL	22	10	8	4	35	20	38	2nd	–	—N/a	—N/a	–	–	–	Kone Kassim	6
2007	TPL	30	10	10	10	38	36	40	9th	–	—N/a	–	W	–	GR	Jakkrit Bunkham	9
2008	TPL	30	13	12	5	37	25	51	4th	–	—N/a	–	–	–	–	Sarayoot Chaikamdee	12
2009	TPL	30	13	8	9	36	32	47	5th	SF	—N/a	QF	–	–	–	Sarayoot Chaikamdee	9
2010	TPL	30	10	12	8	32	30	42	7th	R4		GR	SF	–	–	Cleiton Silva	5
2011	TPL	34	12	15	7	47	32	51	6th	R3		–	–	–	–	Cleiton Silva	10
2012	TPL	34	16	4	14	55	48	52	5th	R3		–	–	–	–	Dudu	10
2013	TPL	32	9	12	11	38	43	39	8th	R4		–	–	–	–	Chananan Pombuppha	10
2014	TPL	38	11	15	12	53	49	48	11th	R3	R3	–	–	–	–	Aron da Silva	15
2015	TPL	34	10	9	15	40	54	39	11th	R4	R2	–	–	–	–	Addison Alves	12
2016	TL	31	8	7	16	45	71	31	15th	R2	R3	–	–	–	–	Anthony Moura-Komenan	10
2017	T1	34	1	3	30	31	128	6	18th	R1	R1	–	–	–	–	Moreira	3

Champions	Runners-up	Third Place	Promoted	Relegated

- P = Played
- W = Games won
- D = Games drawn
- L = Games lost
- F = Goals for
- A = Goals against
- Pts = Points
- Pos = Final position
- N/A = No answer
- TL = Thai League 1
- QR1 = First Qualifying Round
- QR2 = Second Qualifying Round
- QR3 = Third Qualifying Round
- QR4 = Fourth Qualifying Round
- RInt = Intermediate Round
- R1 = Round 1
- R2 = Round 2
- R3 = Round 3
- R4 = Round 4
- R5 = Round 5
- R6 = Round 6
- GR = Group Stage
- QF = Quarter-finals
- SF = Semi-finals
- RU = Runners-up
- S = Shared
- W = Winners

== Former coaches ==
- (Thailand) Chatchai Paholpat 1996 – 2006
- (Thailand) Arjhan Srong-ngamsub 2007 – 2009
- (Thailand) Pairoj Borwonwatanadilok 2010 – May 2013
- (Thailand) Chalermwoot Sa-ngapol June 2013 – June 2014
- (Brazil) Stefano Cugurra Teco 2014 – 2015
- (Thailand) Kritsada Piandit 2015
- (Thailand) Somchai Subpherm 2015 – 2016
- (Thailand) Pairoj Borwonwatanadilok 2016
- (Thailand) Chalermwoot Sa-Ngapol December 2016 – March 2016
- (England) Jason Withe March 2016 – May 2017
- (Thailand) Apisit Kaikaew May 2017 – September 2017
- (Thailand) Suksan Khunsuk September 2017 – November 2017
