= 2013 Thai Division 1 League =

Thai Division 1 League
- Season: 2013
- Champions: Air Force AVIA
- Promoted: Air Force AVIA; Singhtarua; PTT Rayong
- Relegated: Rayong; Rayong United
- Matches: 306
- Goals: 831 (2.72 per match)
- Top goalscorer: (Brazil) Leandro Luz (24 Goals)
- Biggest home win: Bangkok 7-3 Khonkaen
- Biggest away win: Sriracha 2-5 Trat
- Highest scoring: Bangkok 7-3 Khonkaen
- Longest winning run: 9 games Air Force AVIA
- Longest unbeaten run: 21 games PTT Rayong
- Longest winless run: 11 games Rayong
- Longest losing run: 7 games Rayong United
- Highest attendance: 23,844; Nakhon Ratchasima 3-2 Khonkaen (22 September 2013)
- Lowest attendance: 107; Rayong United 1-4 Saraburi (19 October 2013)
- Total attendance: 785,443

2013 Thai League Division 1 (known as Yamaha League 1 for sponsorship reasons) is the 16th season of the League since its establishment in 1997. It is the feeder league for the Thai Premier League. A total of 18 teams will compete in the league this season.

== Changes from last season ==
=== Team changes ===
==== From Division 1 ====
Promoted to Thai Premier League

- Ratchaburi
- Suphanburi
- Bangkok United

Relegated to Regional League Division 2

- Phattalung
- JW Rangsit
- Raj Pracha
- Chanthaburi

==== To Division 1 ====
Relegated from Thai Premier League

- BBCU
- Singhtarua
- TTM Chiangmai

Promoted from Regional League Division 2

- Ayutthaya
- Rayong
- Rayong United
- Trat

==== Renamed Clubs ====
- TTM Chiangmai renamed TTM Lopburi.
- after tree game TTM Lopburi renamed TTM.

==== Expansion Clubs ====
- Nakhon Pathom United

== Teams ==
=== Stadia and locations ===
Locations of the Thai Division 1 League 2013 teams
Football clubs in Bangkok Metropolitan Region

Team	Location	Stadium	Capacity	Ref.
Air Force AVIA	Pathum Thani	Thupatemee Stadium	25,000	
Ayutthaya	Ayutthaya	Ayutthaya Province Stadium	6,000	
Bangkok	Thung Khru, Bangkok	72-years Anniversary Stadium (Bang Mod)	8,000	
BBCU	Bangkok	Thai Army Sports Stadium	20,000	
Khonkaen	Khonkaen	Khon Kaen Province Stadium	8,500	
Krabi	Krabi	Krabi Province Stadium	6,000	
Nakhon Pathom United	Nakhon Pathom	Nakhon Pathom Municipality Sport School Stadium	2,141	
Nakhon Ratchasima	Nakhon Ratchasima	80th Birthday Stadium	20,141	
Phuket	Phuket	Surakul Stadium	15,000	
PTT Rayong	Rayong	PTT Stadium	17,000	
Rayong	Rayong	Rayong Province Stadium	7,000	
Rayong United	Rayong	Rayong Province Stadium	7,000	
Gulf Saraburi	Saraburi	Saraburi Provincial Administrative Organization Stadium	10,000	
Siam Navy	Chonburi	Sattahip Navy Stadium	12,500	
Singhtarua	Bangkok	PAT Stadium	12,308	
Sriracha Suzuki	Chonburi	Suzuki Stadium	10,207	
Trat	Trat	Trat Province Stadium	4,000	
TTM	Lak Si, Bangkok	Boonyachinda Stadium	3,500	

=== Personnel and sponsoring ===
Note: Flags indicate national team as has been defined under FIFA eligibility rules. Players may hold more than one non-FIFA nationality.

Team	Shirt sponsor	Kit manufacturer	Captain	Head coach
Air Force AVIA	Group Avia	Kela	(Thailand) Rungroj Sawangsri	(Thailand) Narasak Boonkleng
Ayutthaya	Gulf	Poom Planet	(Thailand) Sittichai Traisilp	(England) Phil Stubbins
Bangkok	M2F	FBT	(Thailand) Jakkrapong Yaito	(Brazil) Royter Moreira
BBCU	3BB	Ego Sports	(Thailand) Salahudin Arware	(Thailand) Worachai Surinsirirat
Khonkean	Leo Beer	Grand Sport	(Thailand) Supakorn Karada	(Thailand) Pichet Suphomueng
Krabi	Thai AirAsia	Diadora	(Thailand) Thaweephong Ja-reanroob	(Thailand) Paiboon Lertvimonrut
Nakhon Pathom	JC	Kool	(Thailand) Jarupong Sangapong	(Thailand) Vimol Jankam
Nakhon Ratchasima	Mazda	Puma	(Thailand) Anon Boonsukco	(Japan) Sugao Kambe
Phuket	Beyond Resort	Grand Sport	(Ivory Coast) Sylvestre Nenebi Tra	(Brazil) Stefano Cugurra Teco
PTT Rayong	PTT Group	Grand Sport	(Thailand) Yuttana Chaikaew	(Thailand) Nopporn Eksrattra
Rayong	Gulf	FBT	(Thailand) Saifon Kasemsang	(Thailand) Apichart Mosika
Rayong United	Carabao Dang	Lotto	(Thailand) Suradej Saotaisong	(Thailand) Varit Boonsripittayanon
Saraburi	Gulf	Deffo	(Thailand) Manus Tudsuntorn	(Thailand) Totchtawan Sripan
Siam Navy	Group Avia	FBT	(Thailand) Kusoel Pengpol	(Thailand) Arjhan Srong-ngamsub
Singhtarua	Singha	Grand Sport	(Thailand) Kiatjarern Ruangparn	(Thailand) Dusit Chalermsan
Sriracha	Suzuki	FBT	(Thailand) Umpai Mutaporn	(Thailand) Trongyod Klinsrisook
Trat	CP	Tamudo	(Thailand) Rattaporn Saetan	(Thailand) Harnarong Chunhakunakorn
TTM Lopburi	TTM	Mawin	(Thailand) Somchai Hun-ieng	(Thailand) Wisoon Wichaya

=== Foreign players ===
The number of foreign players is restricted to seven per DIV1 team, including a slot for a player from AFC countries. A team can use four foreign players on the field in each game, including at least one player from the AFC country.

Club	Player 1	Player 2	Player 3	Player 4	Player 5	Player 6	Asian Player
Air Force AVIA	(Cameroon) David Bayiha	(France) David Le Bras	(Ivory Coast) Kouassi Yao Hermann	(Ivory Coast) Kobenan N'Guatta	(Nigeria) Julius Oiboh	(Portugal) Zezinando	(Japan) Jun Uruno
Ayutthaya	(Brazil) Daniel Melo	(Chile) Antonio Vega	(Cameroon) Justin Herve	(Cameroon) Malick Ndape	(Nigeria) Adefolarin Durosinmi	(South Korea) Chun Boas	(South Korea) Chang Seung-Weon
Bangkok	(Brazil) Antonio Pina	(Cameroon) Jean Marc	(England) Lee Tuck	(Ghana) Samuel Kwaku	(Sweden) Olof Watson	(Timor-Leste) Wellington Rocha	(Japan) Yuki Bamba
BBCU	(Brazil) Eduardo Salles	(Brazil) Marcio Da Silva	(Cameroon) Bouba Abbo	(Ivory Coast) Fofana Abib	(Guinea) Moussa Sylla	(South Korea) Kim Woo-Chul	(South Korea) Kim Sung-Yeon
Khonkaen	(Argentina) Matias Recio	(Cameroon) Christ Mbondi	(Egypt) Amr Shaaban	(Japan) Shogo Nakahara	(Japan) Yusuke Nakatani	(Japan) Yuto Nagasaka	(China) Li Xiang
Krabi	(Brazil) Valci Júnior	(Burkina Faso) Michel Gnonka	(Cameroon) John Mary	(Nigeria) Anayo Cosmas	(Serbia) Bojan Mamić	(South Korea) Ju Myeong-Gyu	(Laos) Soukaphone
Nakhon Pathom	(Brazil) Paulo Renato	(Cameroon) Pierre Sylvain	(Ghana) Lesley Ablorh	(Togo) Andre Houma	(Trinidad and Tobago) Kordell Samuel	(South Korea) Yoo Jae-Min	(South Korea) Cho Kwang-Hoon
Nakhon Ratchasima	(Brazil) Douglas Lopes	(Cameroon) Munze Ulrich	(Zambia) Noah Chivuta	(Japan) Satoshi Nagano	(Japan) Shota Koide	(North Korea) Kim Song-yong	(Japan) Yusuke Kato
Phuket	(Brazil) Dudu	(Brazil) Cristian Alex	(Cameroon) Ludovick Takam	(France) Geoffrey Doumeng	(Georgia (country)) Giorgi Tsimakuridze	(Ivory Coast) Nenebi	(Japan) Yusuke Sato
PTT Rayong	(Ivory Coast) Amadou Ouattara	(Ivory Coast) Baba Ouattara	(Slovakia) Jozef Tirer	(Slovakia) Miroslav Tóth	(Japan) Terukazu Tanaka	(South Korea) Yeon Gi-sung	(Japan) Noguchi Pinto
Rayong	(Brazil) Mario Da Silva	(Cameroon) Thierry Tchobe	(Cameroon) Tommy Falue	(Cameroon) Walther Henri	(Senegal) Abdel Abzizou	(South Korea) Choi Kun-Sik	(South Korea) Yagin Boas
Rayong United	(Brazil) Marcio Santos	(Japan) Ryohei Maeda	(South Korea) Kwon Dae-hee				(South Korea) Byeon Seung-Won
Saraburi	(Brazil) Mario Neto	(Ivory Coast) Bernard Doumbia	(Ivory Coast) Valery Djomon	(Jamaica) Errol Stevens	(Japan) Yusuke Murayama		(South Korea) Dai Min-Joo
Siam Navy	(Brazil) Rafael Moretto	(Cameroon) Samuel Bille	(Ivory Coast) Diomande Adama	(Mali) Souleymame	(Japan) Seiya Kojima		(South Korea) Jeong Woo-geun
Singhtarua	(Brazil) Leandro Luz	(Ivory Coast) Ali Diarra	(Liechtenstein) Mathias Christen	(Nigeria) Amara Jerry	(Serbia) Ivan Petrović	(Philippines) Patrick Reichelt	(North Korea) Ri Myong-Jun
Sriracha	(Brazil) Diego Pishinin	(Brazil) Ratinho	(Brazil) Sérgio	(Cameroon) Berlin	(Montenegro) Ivan Bošković	(Japan) Jun Kochi	(Indonesia) Irfan Bachdim
Trat	(Brazil) Douglas Cobo	(Cameroon) Woukoue Raymond	(Central African Republic) Franklin Anzité	(Guinea) Almamy Sylla	(Ivory Coast) Labi Kassiaty		(South Korea) Na Kwang-Hyun
TTM Lopburi	(Cameroon) Didier Sohna	(Cameroon) Jacques Bertin	(France) Lassana Sidibe	(Nigeria) Alfred Emoefe	(Japan) Shota Wada	(South Korea) Joo Jin-Hak	(South Korea) Yoo Hong-Youl

=== League table ===
Pos	Team	Pld	W	D	L	GF	GA	GD	Pts	Promotion or relegation
1	Air Force United (C, P)	34	20	9	5	51	28	+23	69	Promotion to 2014 Thai League 1
2	Singhtarua (P)	34	20	5	9	61	40	+21	65	Promotion to 2014 Thai League 1
3	PTT Rayong (P)	34	17	13	4	44	27	+17	64	Promotion to 2014 Thai League 1
4	Bangkok F.C.	34	18	8	8	69	54	+15	62	
5	Nakhon Ratchasima	34	15	9	10	49	35	+14	54	
6	Saraburi	34	12	11	11	49	42	+7	47	
7	Trat	34	12	11	11	59	60	−1	47	
8	Ayutthaya	34	11	11	12	40	41	−1	44	
9	Krabi	34	11	8	15	44	49	−5	41	
10	Siam Navy	34	10	10	14	42	47	−5	40	
11	BBCU	34	9	13	12	33	45	−12	40	
12	Nakhon Pathom	34	9	12	13	47	51	−4	39	
13	Phuket	34	8	15	11	36	42	−6	39	
14	TTM Lopburi	34	9	11	14	36	46	−10	38	
15	Sriracha	34	10	7	17	48	53	−5	37	
16	Khonkaen	34	8	12	14	40	54	−14	36	
17	Rayong (R)	34	8	12	14	48	62	−14	36	Relegation to the 2014 Regional League Division 2
18	Rayong United (R)	34	6	9	19	37	57	−20	27	Relegation to the 2014 Regional League Division 2

Updated to match(es) played on 2 November 2013. Source: Thai Premier League
Rules for classification: 1) points; 2) goal difference; 3) number of goals scored.
(C) Champions; (P) Promoted; (R) Relegated

== Results ==
Home \ Away	AFU	AUT	BAN	BBC	KHO	KRA	NKP	NAK	PHU	PTT	RAY	RUD	SAR	SIH	RAR	SRI	TAT	TTM
Air Force United		2–1	3–0	1–0	1–1	1–0	2–2	0–0	2–1	3–1	2–1	2–1	2–1	1–0	2–0	4–1	1–0	0–0
Ayutthaya	1–3		1–2	2–0	1–1	2–1	1–0	1–2	1–1	0–0	0–0	1–0	3–3	0–2	2–1	1–1	2–2	2–0
Bangkok F.C.	0–0	2–1		2–0	7–3	3–1	2–1	2–1	1–1	2–3	6–2	4–3	3–2	2–1	4–1	3–1	1–1	0–2
BBCU	0–2	0–3	1–2		2–1	2–2	1–1	1–0	1–1	1–1	1–1	2–2	0–0	3–2	1–0	3–1	2–2	1–1
Khonkaen	2–0	1–3	0–3	2–0		2–1	3–2	1–1	1–0	1–1	3–2	0–2	0–2	1–1	2–2	2–0	1–1	1–0
Krabi	1–0	3–0	2–2	0–1	1–1		1–1	1–0	3–1	1–2	4–1	0–0	0–0	1–0	2–1	1–1	3–2	1–2
Nakhon Pathom	0–2	2–0	1–0	2–0	2–1	3–0		3–2	0–0	1–1	2–2	5–2	2–2	2–3	0–3	2–1	1–1	0–2
Nakhon Ratchasima	1–0	1–0	1–2	0–0	3–2	1–0	1–0		3–0	3–2	5–2	1–0	1–1	2–2	5–0	3–2	3–0	2–2
Phuket	1–1	2–2	2–2	2–2	1–0	2–0	2–0	0–1		0–0	2–2	0–1	1–0	1–1	1–0	3–1	0–0	1–1
PTT Rayong	0–0	2–1	2–2	1–0	0–0	2–0	1–0	1–0	3–2		3–0	1–0	1–1	2–2	0–2	1–0	1–2	3–0
Rayong	1–2	0–0	3–0	0–0	3–3	3–1	5–3	1–1	1–0	0–0		1–3	0–2	2–1	1–2	1–1	1–2	2–0
Rayong United	2–2	1–2	1–2	1–2	2–1	1–2	1–1	1–1	0–1	0–2	1–1		1–4	1–2	0–0	1–0	1–2	0–0
Saraburi	2–1	2–1	4–1	2–1	0–0	2–4	1–1	1–1	1–0	0–1	1–1	5–2		1–2	2–1	0–2	1–3	3–0
Singhtarua	2–1	2–1	2–0	1–2	2–0	2–1	1–1	1–0	2–1	0–1	4–2	1–0	2–0		2–1	4–1	3–0	4–2
Siam Navy	2–3	0–1	2–2	0–0	4–1	1–1	4–3	2–0	1–1	1–1	1–0	1–0	0–1	3–1		2–2	0–0	0–1
Sriracha	0–1	0–1	2–0	4–0	1–0	3–1	0–0	0–2	5–1	1–2	3–0	2–2	2–1	2–0	3–1		2–5	1–1
Trat	1–2	1–1	3–3	1–2	1–0	1–3	3–2	3–1	3–3	1–2	1–3	5–2	2–1	1–2	2–2	2–1		3–2
TTM Lopburi	2–2	1–1	0–2	2–1	2–2	3–1	0–1	1–0	0–1	0–0	2–3	1–2	0–0	1–4	0–1	2–1	3–0	

Updated to match(es) played on 2 November 2013. Source:
Legend: Blue = home team win; Yellow = draw; Red = away team win.

== Season statistics ==
=== Top scorers ===
As of 2 November 2013.

Rank	Player	Club	Goals
1	(Brazil) Leandro Oliveira	Singhtarua	24
2	(England) Lee Tuck	Bangkok	23
3	(Argentina) Matias Recio	Khonkaen	19
4	(Brazil) Valci Júnior	Rayong United(8 Goals); Krabi(9 Goals)	17
5	(Ivory Coast) Kouassi Yao Hermann	Air Force United	16
5	(Sweden) Olof Hvidén-Watson	Bangkok	16
7	(Cameroon) Berlin Ndebe-Nlome	Sriracha	15
7	(Japan) Yusuke Kato	Nakhon Ratchasima	15
9	(Ivory Coast) Bernard Doumbia	Saraburi	14
10	(Thailand) Promphong Kransumrong	Nakhon Ratchasima	13

=== Hat-tricks ===
Player	For	Against	Result	Date
(Thailand) Pichet In-bang	BBCU	Sriracha	3–1	9 March 2013
(Brazil) Valci Júnior	Rayong United	Rayong	3–1	7 April 2013
(Thailand) Promphong Kransumrong	Nakhon Ratchasima	Siam Navy	5–0	19 May 2013
(Sweden) Olof Hvidén-Watson	Bangkok	Khonkaen	7–3	29 May 2013
(Central African Republic) Franklin Anzité	Trat	Bangkok	3–3	18 August 2013
(England) Lee Tuck	Bangkok	Siam Navy	4–1	22 September 2013
(Philippines) Patrick Reichelt	Singhtarua	TTM Lopburi	4–2	20 October 2013

=== Annual awards ===
==== Player of the Year ====
- Goalkeeper of the Year – (Japan) Erikson Noguchipinto
- Defender of the Year – (Thailand) Phaisan Pona
- Midfielder of the Year – (Thailand) Sarach Yooyen
- Striker of the Year – (England) Lee Tuck

==== Coach of the Year ====
The Coach of the Year was awarded to (Thailand) Narasak Boonkleng.

==== Golden Boot ====
The Golden Boot was awarded to (Brazil) Leandro de Oliveira da Luz.

== See also ==
- 2013 Thai Premier League
- 2013 Regional League Division 2
- 2013 Thai FA Cup
- 2013 Thai League Cup
- 2013 Kor Royal Cup
