= 2013 Thai Premier League =

Thai Premier League
- Season: 2013
- Champions: Buriram United; 3rd Premier League title
- Relegated: Pattaya United
- Champions League: Buriram United; Muangthong United; Chonburi
- Matches: 272
- Goals: 718 (2.64 per match)
- Top goalscorer: (Spain) Carmelo González (23 goals)
- Biggest home win: Army 6–0 Bangkok Utd
- Biggest away win: TOT 0–5 BEC Tero
- Highest scoring: Buriram 6–2 Bangkok Utd
- Longest winning run: 6 games Chonburi
- Longest unbeaten run: 32 games Buriram United
- Longest winless run: 11 games TOT
- Longest losing run: 8 games Pattaya United; TOT
- Highest attendance: 27,088; Buriram 1–1 Muangthong (11 August 2013)
- Lowest attendance: 560; TOT 0–3 Pattaya United (24 August 2013)
- Total attendance: 1,657,887
- Average attendance: 6,095

The 2013 Thai Premier League (also known as Toyota Thai Premier League due to the sponsorship from Toyota) is the 17th season of the Thai Premier League since its establishment in 1996. A total of 18 teams are competing in the league. It will begin on 2 March 2013 to 3 November 2013.

Muangthong United are the defending champions, having won their Thai Premier League title the previous season. they win the Thai Premier League is a third of the club and Muangthong United became the first team in Thai Premier League to go the season unbeaten in the current 34-game format.

== Teams ==
A total of 18 teams will contest the league, including 15 sides from the 2012 season and three promoted from the 2012 Thai Division 1 League.

TTM Chiangmai, BBCU and Singhtarua were relegated to the 2013 Thai Division 1 League after finishing the 2012 season in the bottom three places. They were replaced by the best three teams from the 2012 Thai Division 1 League champions Ratchaburi, runners-up Suphanburi and third place Bangkok United.

Esan United were originally replaced by Sisaket, but it was discovered the move from Sisaket to Uban Ratchathani (and as a consequence thereof naming the club Esan United) was facilitated with forged documents, fraud and other criminal activity. Sisaket, after a hasty change of ownership, went into recess for this season.

Locations of the 2013 Thai Premier League teams
Football clubs in Bangkok Metropolitan Region

=== Stadiums and locations ===
Note: Table lists in alphabetical order.

Team	Location	Stadium	Capacity	Ref.
Army United	Bangkok	Thai Army Sports Stadium	20,000	
Bangkok Glass	Pathumthani	Leo Stadium	13,000	
Bangkok United	Bangkok	Thai-Japanese Stadium	10,000	
BEC Tero Sasana	Bangkok	72-years Anniversary Stadium	10,000	
Buriram United	Buriram	New I-Mobile Stadium	24,000	
Chainat	Chainat	Khao Plong Stadium	12,000	
Chiangrai United	Chiangrai	United Stadium of Chiangrai	15,000	
Chonburi	Chonburi	Chonburi Stadium	8,500	
Muangthong United	Nonthaburi	SCG Stadium	15,000	
Osotspa Saraburi	Saraburi	Saraburi Stadium	6,000	
Pattaya United	Pattaya	Nongprue Stadium	5,000	
INSEE Police	Pathumthani	Thammasat Stadium	25,000	
Ratchaburi Mitr Phol	Ratchaburi	Ratchaburi Provincial Stadium	10,000	
Samut Songkhram	Samut Songkhram	Samut Songkhram Stadium	6,000	
Sisaket	Sisaket	Sri Nakhon Lamduan Stadium	10,000	
Songkhla United	Songkhla	Tinasulanon Stadium	35,000	
Suphanburi	Suphanburi	Suphanburi Municipality Stadium	20,000	
TOT S.C.	Bangkok	TOT Stadium Chaeng Watthana	5,000	

=== Personnel and sponsoring ===
Note: Flags indicate national team as has been defined under FIFA eligibility rules. Players may hold more than one non-FIFA nationality.

Team	Head coach	Captain	Kit manufacturer	Shirt sponsor
Army United	(Brazil) Alexandré Pölking	(Thailand) Chaiwat Nak-iem	Pan	Chang
Bangkok Glass	(Thailand) Attaphol Buspakom	(Thailand) Teeratep Winothai	Umbro	Leo Beer
Bangkok United	(Thailand) Sasom Pobprasert	(Thailand) Nattaporn Phanrit	FBT	True
BEC Tero Sasana	(Brazil) José Alves Borges	(Thailand) Rangsan Viwatchaichok	FBT	FB Battery
Buriram United	(Spain) Alejandro Menéndez	(Thailand) Suchao Nutnum	-	Chang
Chainat	(Thailand) Surachai Jaturapattarapong	(Thailand) Yuttajak Kornchan	Kappa	-
Chiangrai United	(Thailand) Anurak Srikerd	(Thailand) Teerasak Po-on	DEFFO	Leo Beer
Chonburi	(Thailand) Withaya Laohakul	(Thailand) Pipob On-Mo	Nike	Chang
Muangthong United	(Belgium) René Desaeyere	(Thailand) Datsakorn Thonglao	Grand Sport	SCG
Osotspa Saraburi	(Thailand) Chalermwoot Sa-Ngapol	(Thailand) Jetsada Puanakunmee	Grand Sport	M-150
Pattaya United	(Thailand) Jadet Meelarp	(Thailand) Niweat Siriwong	Grand Sport	True
INSEE Police	(Thailand) Thawatchai Damrong-Ongtrakul	(Thailand) Surachart Sareepim	KELA	INSEE Cement
Ratchaburi	(Spain) Iván Palanco	(Thailand) Prayad Boonya	Umbro	Mitr Phol
Samut Songkhram	(Thailand) Somchai Chuayboonchum	(Thailand) Puthasas Boonpok	Kool Sport	-
Sisaket	(Thailand) Narong Suwannachot	(Thailand) Phusit Pongsura	Joma	Muang Thai
Songkhla United	(Thailand) Sampan Yotatip (Thailand) Pitaya Pimanmaen	(Thailand) Chairat Madsiri	FBT	ManA
Suphanburi	(Thailand) Phayong Khunnaen	(Thailand) Jetsada Boonruangrod	Grand Sport	Chang
TOT	(Thailand) Somchai Subpherm	(Japan) Takahiro Kawamura	-	TOT

=== Managerial changes ===
Team	Outgoing manager	Manner of departure	Date of vacancy	Position in table	Incoming manager	Date of appointment
Suphanburi	(Thailand) Worrawoot Srimaka	Resigned	29 October 2012	Pre-season	(Thailand) Phayong Khunnaen	21 November 2012
BEC Tero Sasana	(Sweden) Sven-Göran Eriksson	End of Contract	31 October 2012	Pre-season	(Belgium) Stéphane Demol	7 December 2012
Army United	(Thailand) Paniphon Kerdyam	End of Contract	10 November 2012	Pre-season	(Brazil) Alexandré Pölking	20 November 2012
Bangkok Glass	(England) Phil Stubbins	Sacked	5 March 2013	8th	(Thailand) Anurak Srikerd	5 March 2013
Pattaya United	(Thailand) Chalermwoot Sa-Ngapol	Resigned	17 April 2013	15th	(Thailand) Chatchai Paholpat	21 April 2013
BEC Tero Sasana	(Belgium) Stéphane Demol	Sacked	22 April 2013	5th	(Belgium) René Desaeyere	28 April 2013
Buriram United	(Thailand) Attaphol Buspakom	Sacked	2 May 2013	2nd	(England) Scott Cooper	22 May 2013
Bangkok Glass	(Thailand) Anurak Srikerd	Removed from position	3 May 2013	12th	(Thailand) Attaphol Buspakom	3 May 2013
Osotspa Saraburi	(Thailand) Pairoj Borwonwatanadilok	Resigned	27 May 2013	13th	(Thailand) Chalermwoot Sa-Ngapol	11 June 2013
Muangthong United	(Serbia) Slaviša Jokanović	Sacked	4 June 2013	2nd	(Germany) Winfried Schäfer	5 June 2013
Chiangrai United	(Brazil) Stefano Cugurra	Sacked	5 June 2013	15th	(Netherlands) Henk Wisman	1 July 2013
Pattaya United	(Thailand) Chatchai Paholpat	Removed from position	30 June 2013	17th	(Thailand) Jadet Meelarp	30 June 2013
Songkhla United	(Thailand) Jadet Meelarp	Signed by Pattaya United	30 June 2013	7th	(Germany) Franz Schwarzwälder	1 July 2013
BEC Tero Sasana	(Belgium) René Desaeyere	Sacked	11 July 2013	5th	(Thailand) Choketawee Promrut	11 July 2013
Ratchaburi	(Thailand) Somchai Maiwilai	Removed from position	16 July 2013	14th	(Spain) Ivan Palanco	16 July 2013
Muangthong United	(Germany) Winfried Schäfer	Signed by Jamaica	18 July 2013	2nd	(Belgium) René Desaeyere	19 July 2013
BEC Tero Sasana	(Thailand) Choketawee Promrut	End of caretaker role	10 August 2013	6th	(Brazil) José Alves Borges	10 August 2013
Buriram United	(England) Scott Cooper	Resigned	1 September 2013	1st	(Spain) Alejandro Menéndez	8 September 2013
Chiangrai United	(Netherlands) Henk Wisman	Sacked	16 September 2013	17th	(Thailand) Anurak Srikerd	16 September 2013
Songkhla United	(Germany) Franz Schwarzwälder	Moved to technical director	26 September 2013	12th	(Thailand) Sampan Yotatip (Thailand) Pitaya Pimanmaen	26 September 2013

=== Foreign players ===
The number of foreign players is restricted to seven per TPL team, but only five of them can be on the game sheet in each game. A team can use four foreign players on the field in each game, including at least one player from the AFC country.

Club	Player 1	Player 2	Player 3	Player 4	Player 5	Player 6	Asian Player	Former Players
Army United	(Argentina) Daniel Blanco	(Brazil) Alessandro Alves	(Brazil) Aron da Silva	(Germany) Björn Lindemann	(Netherlands) Adnan Barakat	(Australia) Danny Invincibile	(South Korea) Jung Myung-Oh	(Cameroon) Matthew Mbuta (Mali) Bakary Diakité
Bangkok Glass	(Brazil) Leandro	(Costa Rica) José Mena	(France) Goran Jerković	(France) Flavien Michelini	(Namibia) Lazarus Kaimbi	(Japan) Hironori Saruta	(Australia) Goran Šubara	(Republic of Ireland) Billy Mehmet (Japan) Shinnosuke Honda
Bangkok United	(Brazil) Tony Costa	(Cameroon) Paul Ekollo	(France) Antonin Trilles	(France) Romain Gasmi	(Serbia) Miloš Bogunović	(Syria) Mohamad Al Hasan	(Iraq) Hussein Alaa Hussein	(Brazil) Gilson Dias (Brazil) Mário César
BEC Tero Sasana	(Brazil) Lucas Gaúcho'	(Brazil) Cleiton Silva	(Democratic Republic of the Congo) Bukasa Kasongo	(Ghana) Isaac Honny	(Ghana) Samuel Drogbele		(Japan) Sho Shimoji	(Brazil) Gabriel Davis (France) Jonathan Béhé (Spain) Arzu
Buriram United	(Spain) Carmelo González	(Spain) Jesús Berrocal	(Spain) Bruno	(Spain) Osmar Ibáñez	(Japan) Kai Hirano		(Philippines) Javier Patiño	(Chile) Ramsés Bustos (Spain) Juan Quero (South Korea) Han Jae-woong
Chainat	(Cameroon) Valery Hiek	(Cameroon) Yannick Mbengono	(Trinidad and Tobago) Kendall Jagdeosingh	(Trinidad and Tobago) Seon Power	(Wales) Michael Byrne	(South Korea) Jo Tae-Keun	(Japan) Masahito Noto	(Cameroon) Florent Obama (Montenegro) Bojan Božović
Chiangrai United	(Brazil) Jerri	(Brazil) Léonardo	(Brazil) Uilian Souza	(Netherlands) Rutger Worm	(Netherlands) Mitchell Kappenberg	(Australia) Kyle Nix	(Japan) Kazuki Murakami	(Brazil) Antônio Cláudio (Brazil) Leandro Assumpção
Chonburi	(Brazil) Leandro Assumpção	(Brazil) Anderson	(Timor-Leste) Thiago Cunha	(Ivory Coast) Fodé Diakité	(Nigeria) Samuel Ajayi	(Spain) Juan Quero	(Japan) Kazuto Kushida	(Indonesia) Irfan Bachdim (Montenegro) Ivan Bošković
Muangthong United	(Bolivia) Edivaldo	(Ivory Coast) Dagno Siaka	(North Macedonia) Mario Gjurovski	(North Korea) Pak Nam-Chol	(North Korea) Ri Kwang-Chon	(South Korea) Bang Seung-Hwan	(South Korea) Kim Yoo Jin	(Austria) Roland Linz (Netherlands) Adnan Barakat
Osotspa Saraburi	(Ivory Coast) Anthony Komenan	(Namibia) Tangeni Shipahu	(Japan) Hiromichi Katano	(Japan) Suguru Hashimoto			(Japan) Hiroyuki Yamamoto	(Namibia) Lazarus Kaimbi (Zambia) Trywell Kaira
Pattaya United	(Nigeria) Efe Obode	(Nigeria) Ajoku Obinna	(Russia) Rod Dyachenko	(Slovakia) Marián Juhás	(South Africa) Makhosonke Bhengu	(South Korea) Kang Bong-Jun	(South Korea) Ahn Byung-keon	(South Korea) Jung Chul-woon (South Korea) Jung Ji-soo
INSEE Police	(Brazil) Daniel	(Brazil) Felipe Ferreira	(Brazil) Pedrinho	(Cameroon) Yannick Ossok	(France) Michaël Murcy	(South Korea) Woo Hyun	(South Korea) Lee Han-guk	(Cameroon) Ludovick Takam
Ratchaburi	(Brazil) Douglas	(Brazil) Wellington	(Colombia) Jhon Obregón	(Costa Rica) José Luis Cordero	(Ivory Coast) Henri Jöel	(South Korea) Jang Gil-Hyeok	(South Korea) Cho Jin-Soo	(Ghana) Awudu Okocha (Guadeloupe) Larry Clavier
Samut Songkhram	(Argentina) Lucas Daniel	(Brazil) Victor Amaro	(Ivory Coast) Marc Landry Babo	(Madagascar) Guy Hubert	(Sierra Leone) Shaka Bangura	(South Korea) Park Jae-hyun	(South Korea) Jung Ho-Jin	(Central African Republic) Franklin Anzité (Ghana) Gilbert Koomson (South Korea) Kim Do-Yeon
Songkhla United	(Cameroon) Jules Baga	(France) Jonathan Matijas	(Ivory Coast) Koné Seydou	(Nigeria) Saidu Sani	(Serbia) Darko Rakočević		(Japan) Daiki Higuchi	(Brazil) Aron da Silva (Cameroon) Elvis Job
Suphanburi	(Brazil) Tales	(Cameroon) Njie Divine	(Ivory Coast) Bireme Diouf	(Montenegro) Dragan Boškovic	(South Korea) Kim Tae-Young		(Australia) Rocky Visconte	(Croatia) Ante Rožić (El Salvador) Christian Castillo (Serbia) Nikola Komazec
TOT	(Brazil) Juninho	(England) Bas Savage	(Ivory Coast) Kone Mohamed	(South Korea) Lee Jun-Ki			(Japan) Takahiro Kawamura	(France) Younes Chaib (Serbia) Rodoljub Paunović (Serbia) Žarko Jeličić

== League table ==
Pos	Team	Pld	W	D	L	GF	GA	GD	Pts	Qualification or relegation
1	Buriram United (C)	32	23	9	0	73	23	+50	78	2014 AFC Champions League Group stage
2	Muangthong United	32	21	8	3	61	33	+28	71	2014 AFC Champions League Qualifying play-off (Note: The winners of the 2013 Thai FA Cup will also qualify for the play-off of the 2014 AFC Champions League. If the winners have already qualified to ACL through the championship, the spot will be awarded to the third-placed team.)
3	Chonburi	32	18	8	6	61	35	+26	62	2014 AFC Champions League Qualifying play-off
4	Suphanburi	32	14	9	9	40	31	+9	51	
5	Bangkok Glass	32	14	8	10	40	31	+9	50	
6	Army United	32	13	9	10	48	40	+8	48	
7	BEC Tero Sasana	32	13	9	10	56	49	+7	48	
8	Osotspa Saraburi	32	9	12	11	38	43	−5	39	
9	INSEE Police	32	9	11	12	40	37	+3	38	
10	Chainat	32	10	8	14	42	43	−1	38	
11	Chiangrai United	32	8	10	14	32	45	−13	34	
12	Songkhla United	32	7	11	14	30	47	−17	32	
13	Bangkok United	32	8	7	17	38	61	−23	31	
14	TOT	32	8	7	17	27	54	−27	31	
15	Ratchaburi	32	6	12	14	31	39	−8	30	
16	Samut Songkhram	32	6	12	14	22	41	−19	30	
17	Pattaya United (R)	32	9	2	21	39	66	−27	29	Relegation to the Thai Division 1 League
18	Sisaket	0	0	0	0	0	0	0	0	

Updated to match(es) played on 3 November 2013. Source: Thai Premier League
(C) Champions; (R) Relegated

== Results ==
Home \ Away	ARM	BKG	BKU	BEC	BRU	CHA	CRU	CHO	MTU	OSO	PAT	POL	RAT	SAS	SIS	SON	SUP	TOT
Army United		0–3	6–0	2–1	0–0	0–0	3–2	1–1	0–2	1–0	3–2	2–2	1–0	2–0		1–1	1–1	3–2
Bangkok Glass	1–0		3–1	2–3	0–0	2–1	2–0	0–0	1–0	3–0	4–1	0–1	1–0	2–0		1–0	0–0	5–1
Bangkok United	0–4	1–1		2–3	0–2	3–2	2–1	0–2	1–1	0–0	4–0	0–0	4–2	1–1		3–1	1–2	2–1
BEC Tero Sasana	4–1	1–0	1–1		1–1	2–4	2–4	2–2	2–2	1–1	3–1	3–2	0–3	1–2		2–0	1–1	2–3
Buriram United	3–0	2–0	6–2	2–0		1–0	2–0	2–1	1–1	4–1	5–0	3–1	2–1	5–1		6–1	1–1	2–1
Chainat	2–2	3–1	2–1	1–1	2–3		0–0	1–2	1–2	1–2	4–2	1–0	2–0	1–0		2–0	3–0	0–0
Chiangrai United	2–1	2–2	4–2	0–3	2–2	2–1		3–4	1–3	0–3	0–0	2–2	1–0	0–0		0–0	0–0	1–3
Chonburi	1–0	3–1	1–0	3–0	1–4	2–1	3–0		0–2	0–0	5–1	1–0	4–2	4–0		5–1	0–0	1–0
Muangthong United	2–1	1–0	3–2	3–1	1–2	2–2	2–1	1–1		1–1	3–2	2–0	3–2	2–1		3–0	3–1	2–1
Osotspa Saraburi	2–1	0–0	3–1	2–4	1–2	1–1	0–1	1–4	1–3		2–1	1–1	0–0	2–1		1–1	0–2	4–0
Pattaya United	1–2	1–2	1–2	2–1	0–3	3–0	0–1	4–3	0–1	1–2		1–3	1–2	1–0		2–2	1–0	0–1
Police United	3–2	5–0	1–0	1–2	0–1	0–0	0–0	3–1	2–2	1–1	1–2		0–0	0–1		1–1	0–2	1–0
Ratchaburi	0–0	0–1	1–0	0–1	2–2	2–3	0–0	1–1	0–2	2–3	3–0	1–0		0–0		0–1	1–1	1–0
Samut Songkhram	1–1	1–1	0–0	0–2	1–2	1–0	0–2	2–1	1–1	0–0	0–2	2–1	2–2			2–0	1–3	0–0
Sisaket																		
Songkhla United	1–2	1–0	0–1	0–0	0–0	2–0	1–0	1–1	0–2	2–2	3–1	0–2	2–2	1–1			2–1	4–0
Suphanburi	0–1	1–0	3–0	1–1	1–2	2–0	1–0	0–1	3–1	2–1	1–2	2–5	0–0	1–0		2–1		3–1
TOT	0–4	1–1	3–1	0–5	0–0	2–1	1–0	1–2	1–2	1–0	0–3	1–1	1–1	0–0		1–0	0–2	

Updated to match(es) played on 3 November 2013. Source: Thai Premier League
Legend: Blue = home team win; Yellow = draw; Red = away team win.

== Season statistics ==
=== Top scorers ===
As of 4 November 2013.

Rank	Player	Club	Goals
1	(Spain) Carmelo González	Buriram United	23
2	(Brazil) Cleiton Silva	BEC Tero Sasana	20
3	(Thailand) Teerasil Dangda	Muangthong United	15
4	(Philippines) Javier Patiño	Buriram United	14
5	(Timor-Leste) Thiago Cunha	Chonburi	13
6	(Brazil) Aron da Silva	Army United	12
6	(North Macedonia) Mario Gjurovski	Muangthong United	12
8	(Thailand) Sumanya Purisai	Chainat	11
8	(Ivory Coast) Dagno Siaka	Muangthong United	11
10	(Thailand) Chatree Chimtalay	Bangkok Glass	10
10	(Brazil) Leandro Assumpção	Chonburi	10
10	(Thailand) Chananan Pombuppha	Osotspa Saraburi	10
10	(France) Michaël Murcy	Police United	10
10	(Brazil) Douglas	Ratchaburi	10
10	(Montenegro) Dragan Boškovic	Suphanburi	10

=== Hat-tricks ===
Player	For	Against	Result	Date
(Spain) Carmelo González	Buriram United	Songkhla United	6–1	6 April 2013
(Thailand) Sompong Soleb	Bangkok United	Pattaya United	4–0	27 April 2013
(Thailand) Ronnachai Rangsiyo	Bangkok United	Chainat	3–2	29 May 2013
(France) Michaël Murcy	Police United	Bangkok Glass	5–0	3 August 2013
(Thailand) Chananan Pombuppha	Osotspa Saraburi	TOT	4–0	4 August 2013
(Brazil) Cleiton Silva	BEC Tero Sasana	TOT	5–0	14 August 2013
(Cameroon) Yannick Mbengono	Chainat	BEC Tero Sasana	4–2	21 August 2013
(Spain) Carmelo González^{4}	Buriram United	Samut Songkhram	5–1	25 August 2013
(Thailand) Teerasil Dangda	Muangthong United	Osotspa Saraburi	3–1	5 October 2013
(Thailand) Sumanya Purisai	Chainat	Suphanburi	3–0	19 October 2013

- ^{4} Player scored 4 goals

== Awards ==
=== Monthly awards ===
Month	Manager of the Month		Player of the Month		Reference
Month	Manager	Club	Player	Club	Reference
March	(Serbia) Slaviša Jokanović	Muangthong United	(Brazil) Cleiton Silva	BEC Tero Sasana	
April	(Thailand) Attaphol Buspakom	Buriram United	(Philippines) Javier Patiño	Buriram United	
May	(Thailand) Phayong Khunnaen	Suphanburi	(Thailand) Tanaboon Kesarat	BEC Tero Sasana	
June	(England) Scott Cooper	Buriram United	(Thailand) Wuttichai Tathong	Suphanburi	
July	(Thailand) Chalermwoot Sa-Ngapol	Osotspa Saraburi	(Thailand) Narit Taweekul	Bangkok Glass	
August	(Belgium) René Desaeyere	Muangthong United	(Thailand) Datsakorn Thonglao	Muangthong United	
September	(Thailand) Attaphol Buspakom	Bangkok Glass	(Thailand) Teeratep Winothai	Bangkok Glass	
October	(Thailand) Anurak Srikerd	Chiangrai United	(Thailand) Theeraton Bunmathan	Buriram United	

=== Annual awards ===
==== Player of the Year ====
Awards	Nation/Name	Club
The Player of the Year	(Thailand) Theeraton Bunmathan	Buriram United
Goalkeeper of the Year	(Thailand) Narit Taweekul	Bangkok Glass
Defender of the Year	(Spain) Osmar Barba	Buriram United
Midfielder of the Year	(Ivory Coast) Dagno Siaka	Muangthong United
Striker of the Year	(Brazil) Cleiton Silva	BEC Tero Sasana

==== Coach of the Year ====
Awards	Nation/Name	Club
The Coach of the Year	(Thailand) Attaphol Buspakom	Bangkok Glass

==== Golden Boot ====
Awards	Nation/Name	Club
The Golden Boot of the Year	(Spain) Carmelo González	Buriram United

==== Fair Play ====
Awards	Club
The Fair Play of the Year	Suphanburi

== Attendances ==
Pos	Team	Total	High	Low	Average	Change
1	Buriram United	303,054	27,088	14,592	18,941	+23.6%
2	Suphanburi	229,145	21,059	9,043	14,322	+160.6%^{†}
3	Muangthong United	174,212	14,114	7,458	10,888	−18.9%
4	Chiangrai United	121,570	14,251	3,670	7,598	−5.4%
5	Bangkok Glass	118,737	13,300	4,937	7,421	+4.3%
6	Chonburi	97,318	8,656	3,953	6,082	+2.3%
7	Songkhla United	94,421	19,444	1,915	5,901	−13.5%
8	Army United	79,386	11,292	2,486	4,962	+52.0%
9	BEC Tero Sasana	65,892	6,856	652	4,118	+13.0%
10	Chainat	63,011	7,714	1,434	3,938	+17.3%
11	Ratchaburi	60,207	7,383	1,911	3,763	+18.3%^{†}
12	INSEE Police	59,854	9,831	1,659	3,741	+8.2%
13	Osotspa Saraburi	56,505	6,746	2,063	3,532	+26.5%
14	Bangkok United	45,860	6,125	1,445	2,866	+118.8%^{†}
15	Samut Songkhram	31,398	3,750	1,121	1,962	+2.7%
16	Pattaya United	31,129	3,910	1,123	1,946	−7.2%
17	TOT	26,188	5,015	560	1,637	+13.4%
	League total	1,657,887	27,088	560	6,095	+26.4%

Updated to games played on 3 November 2013
Source: Thai Premier League
Notes:
^{†} Teams played previous season in Division 1

== See also ==
- 2013 League One
- 2013 Regional League Division 2
- 2013 AFC Champions League
- 2013 Thai FA Cup
- 2013 Thai League Cup
- Thai Premier League All-Star Football
