= Piyachart Phalanglit =

Thai footballer (born 1997)

Personal information
- Full name: Piyachart Phalanglit
- Date of birth: 15 June 1997 (age 29)
- Place of birth: Bangkok, Thailand
- Position: Midfielder

Team information
- Current team: Police Tero
- Number: 14

Youth career
- 2012–2015: Rajdamnern Commercial College
- 2016: Super Power Samut Prakan
- 2017: Buriram United

Senior career*
Years	Team	Apps	(Gls)
2018–2019	Navy	2	(0)
2020–	Police Tero	0	(0)
- * Club domestic league appearances and goals

Piyachart Phalanglit (Thai: ปิยชาติ พลังฤทธิ์; born June 15, 1997) is a Thai professional footballer who plays as a midfielder for Thai League 1 club Police Tero.
