= Ekkapob Sanitwong =

Thai footballer (born 1984)

Personal information
- Full name: Ekkapob Sanitwong
- Date of birth: 5 April 1984 (age 42)
- Place of birth: Thailand
- Height: 1.78 m (5 ft 10 in)
- Position: Left-back

Senior career*
Years	Team	Apps	(Gls)
2015	Saraburi	1	(0)
2017	Super Power Samut Prakan	11	(0)
2017	Ubon UMT	11	(0)
2018	Krabi		
2019	Ubon United		
2019	Air Force Central		
2020	Uthai Thani		
- * Club domestic league appearances and goals

Ekkapob Sanitwong (Thai: เอกภพ สนิทวงษ์;) is a Thai footballer who plays as a left-back.
