= Kim Yoo-jin (footballer, born 1983) =

South Korean footballer

Kim Yoo-Jin
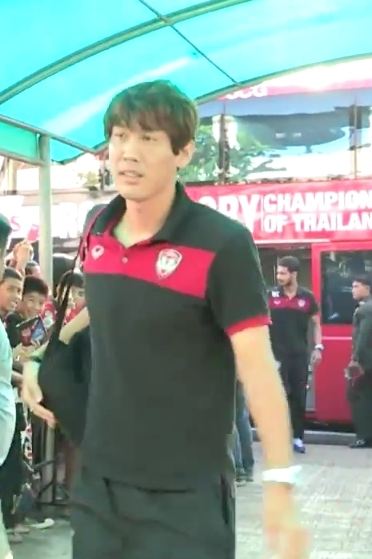
- Kim in the Saraburi Stadium, before a match against Osotspa Saraburi in the 2013 Toyota Thai Premier League

Personal information
- Full name: Kim Yoo-jin
- Date of birth: June 19, 1983 (age 43)
- Place of birth: Busan, South Korea
- Height: 1.89 m (6 ft 2 in)
- Position: Centre back

Youth career
- 2000–2002: Suwon Bluewings

Senior career*
Years	Team	Apps	(Gls)
2002–2004	Suwon Samsung Bluewings	0	(0)
2003–2004	→ Police (army)	0	(0)
2005	Busan I'Park	21	(0)
2006	Sagan Tosu	40	(3)
2007–2009	Busan I'Park	32	(2)
2010	Yokohama FC	19	(0)
2011–2012	Liaoning Whowin	53	(6)
2013	Muangthong United	28	(2)
2014	Bangkok United	27	(2)
2015	Liaoning Whowin	23	(0)
Total		243	(15)

International career^{‡}
2003–2004	South Korea U-20	3	(0)
- * Club domestic league appearances and goals as of 1 November 2015 ‡ National team caps and goals as of 9 October 2011

- Kim Yoo-jin
- Hangul: 김유진
- Hanja: 金裕晋
- RR: Gim Yujin
- MR: Kim Yujin

Kim Yoo-Jin (born June 19, 1983) is a South Korean retired football defender.

His previous clubs include K-League side Suwon Bluewings, Busan I'Park and J2 League side Yokohama.

== Club statistics ==
Club performance			League		Cup		League Cup		Continental		Total	
Season	Club	League	Apps	Goals	Apps	Goals	Apps	Goals	Apps	Goals	Apps	Goals
South Korea			League		KFA Cup		League Cup		Asia		Total	
2002	Suwon Samsung Bluewings	K-League	0	0			0	0				
2003	Suwon Samsung Bluewings	K-League	0	0	0	0	0	0	-		0	0
2004	Suwon Samsung Bluewings	K-League	0	0	1	0	0	0	-		1	0
2005	Busan I'Park	K-League	21	0	1	0	4	0				
Japan			League		Emperor's Cup		League Cup		Asia		Total	
2006	Sagan Tosu	J2 League	40	3	1	0	-		-		41	3
South Korea			League		KFA Cup		League Cup		Asia		Total	
2007	Busan I'Park	K-League	6	1	1	0	5	0	-		12	1
2008	Busan I'Park	K-League	19	1	2	0	6	1	-		27	2
2009	Busan I'Park	K-League	7	0	0	0	3	0	-		10	0
Japan			League		Emperor's Cup		League Cup		Asia		Total	
2010	Yokohama FC	J2 League	19	0	0	0	-		-		19	0
China PR			League		FA Cup		CSL Cup		Asia		Total	
2011	Liaoning Whowin	Chinese Super League	29	4	0	0	-		-		29	4
2012	Liaoning Whowin	Chinese Super League	24	2	1	0	-		-		25	2
Thailand			League		FA Cup		League Cup		Asia		Total	
2013	Muangthong United	Thai Premier League	12	0	1	0	1	0	5	1	19	1
Total	South Korea		53	2	5	0	18	1			76	3
Total	Japan		59	3	1	0	-		-		60	3
Total	China PR		53	6	1	0	-		-		54	6
Total	Thailand		25	0	3	0	2	0	5	1	35	1
Career total			165	11	7	0	18	1			190	12
