= Carmelo González =

Carmelo González may refer to:

- Carmelo Reyes González or Cien Caras (born 1949), Mexican professional wrestler
- Carmelo González (footballer) (born 1983), Spanish footballer
