= Albert Manteca =

Spanish footballer

Personal information
- Full name: Albert Manteca Buldo
- Date of birth: 10 June 1988 (age 38)
- Place of birth: Begues, Spain
- Height: 1.84 m (6 ft 1/2 in)
- Position: Forward

Youth career
- Castelldefels
- 2003–2006: Damm
- 2006–2007: Barcelona

Senior career*
Years	Team	Apps	(Gls)
2007–2008	Burgos B	27	(2)
2009–2010	Gavà	37	(8)
2010–2011	Sant Andreu	28	(3)
2011–2013	Celta B	32	(4)
2013	St. Pölten	12	(2)
2014–2015	Sisaket	5	(0)
2015	Sant Andreu	5	(0)
- * Club domestic league appearances and goals as of 7 June 2014

Albert Manteca Buldo (born 10 June 1988) is a Spanish footballer who plays as a forward.

== Club career ==
Born in Begues, Barcelona, Catalonia, Manteca joined FC Barcelona's youth setup in 2006, aged 18, after playing for CF Damm and UE Castelldefels. He made his senior debuts with Burgos CF's reserves in the 2007–08 campaign, in the lower leagues.

Manteca was promoted to the latter's main squad in the 2008 summer, but was subsequently released and went on a trial at Club Atlético Lanús in November. However, nothing came of it and he started training with Segunda División B's CF Gavà in March 2009, signing a contract in July.

In 2010 Manteca joined Hamilton Academical F.C. in a trial basis, but signed for UE Sant Andreu also in the third level. In July of the following year he moved to fellow league team Celta de Vigo B.

On 29 January 2013 Manteca moved abroad for the first time in his career, joining Austrian Football First League club SKN St. Pölten. He played his first match as a professional on 8 March, coming on as a second half substitute for Mirnel Sadović in a 1–2 away loss against SC Rheindorf Altach.

In February 2014 Manteca switched teams and countries again, joining Thai Premier League's Sisaket F.C. He made his debut for the club on 22 March, against TOT S.C., and appeared in five matches during the season.

On 30 January 2015 Manteca returned to Sant Andreu, signing a six-month contract.
