= Adnan Barakat =

Dutch footballer (born 1982)

Personal information
- Full name: Adnan Barakat
- Date of birth: 3 September 1982 (age 44)
- Place of birth: Amsterdam, Netherlands
- Height: 1.73 m (5 ft 8 in)
- Position: Midfielder

Senior career*
| Years | Team | Apps | (Gls) |
| 2002–2005 | NAC | 40 | (4) |
| 2005–2006 | Eindhoven | 34 | (3) |
| 2006–2008 | Cambuur | 69 | (9) |
| 2008–2010 | FC Den Bosch | 57 | (16) |
| 2010–2011 | FK Baku | 31 | (11) |
| 2012–2013 | Muangthong United | 50 | (19) |
| 2013–2014 | Army United | 16 | (10) |
| 2014 | Songkhla United | 17 | (15) |
| 2014–2016 | Police United | 52 | (14) |
| 2016–2019 | OFC Oostzaan | 12 | (5) |
| Total | | 378 | (106) |
- * Club domestic league appearances and goals as of 02:02, 16 January 2026 (UTC)

Adnan Barakat (Arabic: عدنان بركات; born 3 September 1982) is a Dutch former professional footballer who played as a right winger for Dutch sides Ajax Amsterdam, NAC Breda, FC Eindhoven, Cambuur Leeuwarden, FK Baku, FC Den Bosch and Muangthong United among others.

== Career ==
Barakat signed for Azerbaijan Premier League side FK Baku in January 2010 on a 2.5-year contract. He made his debut for Baku on 2 February 2010 in their 2–1 home victory over Turan Tovuz, with his first goal for Baku coming the following season on 6 November 2010 in their 3–1 away win over Ganja.

He won the cup of Azerbaijan, and played Europe League that year and the years he played at NAC Breda. He worked with coaches Henk Ten Cate, Co Adriaanse, Bülent Korkmaz, Winfried Schäfer, Aleksandrs Starkovs, and now former Chelsea player Slaviša Jokanović Last season he won the Premier League title of Thailand with Muang Thong United and he played a big role in it.

In November 2011 Barakat left Baku having not been paid for months. After leaving Baku, Barakat signed for Muangthong United in January 2012, but was unable to play for them straight away due to his dispute with Baku, and the club withholding his registration. He left Muangthong United in July 2013.

In February 2014, Barakat moved to another Thai Premier League club, Songkhla United.

== Career statistics ==
Appearances and goals by club, season and competition
| Club | Season | League | | | Cup | | Continental | | Total | |
| Club | Season | Division | Apps | Goals | Apps | Goals | Apps | Goals | Apps | Goals |
|---|---|---|---|---|---|---|---|---|---|---|
| Baku | 2009–10 | Azerbaijan Premier League | 10 | 0 | 3 | 0 | 0 | 0 | 13 | 0 |
| Baku | 2010–11 | Azerbaijan Premier League | 21 | 1 | 1 | 0 | 1 | 0 | 22 | 1 |
| Baku | Total | | 31 | 1 | 4 | 0 | 1 | 0 | 36 | 1 |
| Muangthong United | 2012 | Thai Premier League | | | | | – | | | |
| Muangthong United | 2013 | Thai Premier League | 4 | 1 | | | 0 | 0 | 4 | 1 |
| Muangthong United | Total | | | | | | 0 | 0 | 45 | 7 |
| Army United | 2013 | Thai Premier League | 16 | 1 | | | – | | 16 | 1 |
| Songkhla United | 2014 | Thai Premier League | 17 | 4 | | | – | | 17 | 4 |
| Police United | 2014 | Thai Premier League | 13 | 4 | | | – | | 8 | 1 |
| Career total | | | 76 | 8 | 4 | 0 | 1 | 0 | 81 | 8 |

== Honours ==
FK Baku

- Azerbaijan Cup: 2009–10

Muangthong United

- Thai Premier League: 2012
