= Jun Uruno =

Japanese footballer

Personal information
- Full name: Jun Uruno
- Date of birth: October 23, 1979 (age 47)
- Place of birth: Tsurugashima, Saitama, Japan
- Height: 1.74 m (5 ft 8 1/2 in)
- Position: Forward

Senior career*
Years	Team	Apps	(Gls)
1998–2005	Honda	146	(31)
2006–2008	Ventforet Kofu	61	(7)
2009–2011	Roasso Kumamoto	78	(11)
2012	Bangkok United		
2013	Air Force AVIA	28	(3)
2014	Honda	5	(0)
2015	Ubon UMT United		
Total		318	(52)
- * Club domestic league appearances and goals

Jun Uruno (宇留野 純, Uruno Jun; born October 23, 1979) is a former Japanese football player.

== Club statistics ==
Club performance			League		Cup		League Cup		Total	
Season	Club	League	Apps	Goals	Apps	Goals	Apps	Goals	Apps	Goals
Japan			League		Emperor's Cup		League Cup		Total	
1998	Honda	Football League	0	0	0	0	-		0	0
1999	Honda	Football League	2	0	2	0	-		4	0
2000	Honda	Football League	21	8	1	0	-		22	8
2001	Honda	Football League	28	5	2	0	-		30	5
2002	Honda	Football League	13	3	3	1	-		16	4
2003	Honda	Football League	29	4	3	0	-		32	4
2004	Honda	Football League	25	2	3	1	-		28	3
2005	Honda	Football League	28	9	2	1	-		30	10
2006	Ventforet Kofu	J1 League	20	4	3	0	3	0	26	4
2007	Ventforet Kofu	J1 League	22	0	1	0	2	0	25	0
2008	Ventforet Kofu	J2 League	19	3	1	0	-		20	3
2009	Roasso Kumamoto	J2 League	38	7	1	0	-		39	7
2010	Roasso Kumamoto	J2 League	31	4	2	0	-		33	4
2011	Roasso Kumamoto	J2 League	9	0	0	0	-		9	0
Thailand			League		Queen's Cup		League Cup		Total	
2012	Bangkok United	Premier League								
2013	Air Force AVIA	Thai Division 1 League	28	3	0	0	0	0	28	3
Career total			313	52	24	3	5	0	342	55

== Honours ==
Air Force Central

- Thai Division 1 League: 2013
