= Osotspa Saraburi F.C. in Asia =

Statistics of Osotspa Saraburi in Asian competition.

== AFC Champions League ==
Team	GP	W	D	L	F	A	GD	PTS
Osotsapa	3	0	0	3	1	20	-19	0

=== Results ===
Season	Home team	Score	Away team	Venue
2002–03	(Thailand) Osotsapa	0–6	(South Korea) Seongnam Ilhwa Chunma	Dalian People's Stadium, China
2002–03	(Thailand) Osotsapa	1–7	(China) Dalian Shide	Dalian People's Stadium, China
2002–03	(Thailand) Osotsapa	0–7	(Japan) Shimizu S-Pulse	Dalian People's Stadium, China

== AFC Cup ==
Team	GP	W	D	L	F	A	GD	PTS
Osotsapa	6	3	1	2	12	3	+9	10

=== Results ===
Season	Team 1	Score	Team 2	Venue
2007	(Thailand) Osotsapa	4–0	(Malaysia) Pahang FA	Royal Thai Army Stadium, Thailand
2007	(Singapore) Tampines Rovers	2–1	(Thailand) Osotsapa	Tampines Stadium, Singapore
2007	(Thailand) Osotsapa	0–0	(India) Mohun Bagan AC	Royal Thai Army Stadium, Thailand
2007	(India) Mohun Bagan AC	1–0	(Thailand) Osotsapa	Salt Lake Stadium, India
2007	(Malaysia) Pahang FA	0–4	(Thailand) Osotsapa	Shah Alam Stadium, Malaysia
2007	(Thailand) Osotsapa	3–0	(Singapore) Tampines Rovers	Royal Thai Army Stadium, Thailand
