= Jakkrit Bunkham =

Thai footballer (born 1982)

Personal information
- Full name: Jakkrit Bunkham
- Date of birth: 7 December 1982 (age 43)
- Place of birth: Phichit, Thailand
- Height: 1.71 m (5 ft 7 1/2 in)
- Positions: Attacking midfielder; left midfielder

Youth career
- 2000: TTM Phichit

Senior career*
Years	Team	Apps	(Gls)
2001–2009	Osotsapa	113	(26)
2010–2011	Thai Port	17	(0)
2011–2012	BEC Tero Sasana	10	(0)
2012–2013	Suphanburi	13	(0)
2014–2015	Osotspa Samut Prakan	15	(0)
2016–2017	Khonkaen	23	(6)
Total		191	(32)

International career
200	Thailand U23		
2004–2010	Thailand	2	(0)

Managerial career
- 2020: Khon Kaen
- 2020–2021: Rajpracha
- 2021: Rajpracha (caretaker)
- * Club domestic league appearances and goals

Jakkrit Bunkham (Thai: จักรกริช บุญคำ, born December 7, 1982), simply known as Jay (Thai: เจ), is a Thai retired professional footballer who played as an attacking midfielder.

== International career ==
Jakkrit was a member of the Thailand national football team during 2004 to 2010.

== Honours ==
=== Clubs ===
Osotsapa

- Queen's Cup: 2002, 2003, 2004
- Kor Royal Cup: 2001, 2006

Thai Port

- Thai League Cup: 2010

=== International ===
Thailand U-23

- Sea Games Gold Medal: 2005
