= Olof Hvidén-Watson =

Swedish footballer

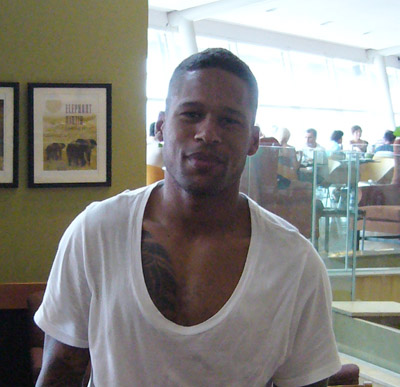

Personal information
- Date of birth: 10 August 1982 (age 44)
- Place of birth: Gothenburg, Sweden
- Height: 1.82 m (5 ft 11 1/2 in)
- Positions: Midfielder; forward

Youth career
- Västra Frölunda IF

Senior career*
Years	Team	Apps	(Gls)
1998–2001	Västra Frölunda IF	6	(0)
2002–2003	Fredrikstad FK	37	(5)
2004–2005	Pors Grenland	35	(5)
2006–2007	Odd Grenland	30	(2)
2007	→ Bodø/Glimt (loan)	11	(3)
2008	FC KooTeePee	20	(1)
2009	FC Trollhättan	27	(0)
2010	Osotspa Saraburi	9	(2)
2011	Rajnavy Club		
2012	Thai Port	22	(10)
2013	Bangkok		
2014	BBCU		(5)
2015	Ubon UMT United		(6)
2015–2016	Khon Kaen United		
- * Club domestic league appearances and goals as of 27 May 2009

Olof Hvidén-Watson (born 10 August 1982) is a Swedish football midfielder. He became slightly famous in Norway in 2007 when he played for the Norwegian Premiership club Odd Grenland, most of the season. Towards the end of the 2007 season he was loaned out to first division side Bodø/Glimt. Hvidén-Watson ended up playing for Bodø/Glimt against Odd Grenland in the final play off match for The Premier Division. Bodø/Glimt won, and he helped relegate the club that owned him.
