= Leandro (footballer, born 1983) =

Brazilian footballer

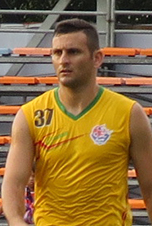
- Leandro in 2016

Personal information
- Full name: Leandro de Oliveira da Luz
- Date of birth: 1 March 1983 (age 43)
- Place of birth: Cândido Mota, São Paulo, Brazil
- Height: 1.78 m (5 ft 10 in)
- Position: Forward

Youth career
- Santos

Senior career*
Years	Team	Apps	(Gls)
2001–2002	Santos	5	(0)
2003	Brasiliense		
2004	Saturn	11	(1)
2005	Paysandu	9	(2)
2006	Ponte Preta	11	(3)
2007	Cabofriense	21	(12)
2007–2010	Hải Phòng Cement	68	(53)
2011	Becamex Bình Dương	23	(12)
2012	Matsubara	32	(8)
2013–2014	Singhtarua	36	(34)
2015	Bangkok Glass	9	(2)
2015	→ Osotspa Samut Prakan (loan)	5	(5)
2016–2017	PTT Rayong	21	(9)
2019	União Rondonópolis	1	(0)

International career
2003	Brazil U23	4	(1)
- * Club domestic league appearances and goals

Leandro de Oliveira da Luz (born 3 March 1983), known as simply Leandro, is a former Brazilian footballer who mainly played as a forward. A graduate of the Santos academy, he is best known for his time at Hải Phòng Cement in Vietnam.

Alongside 2004 Copa América champions Vágner Love and Dudu Cearense, Leandro represented Brazil at the 2003 Pan American Games in the Dominican Republic, winning the silver medal.

== Honours ==
=== Club ===
Santos

- Campeonato Brasileiro Série A: 2002

Paysandu

- Campeonato Paraense: 2005

=== International ===
- Pan American Games silver medal: 2003

=== Individual ===
- Thai Division 1 League top scorer: 2013
