= Kouassi Yao Hermann =

Ivorian footballer

Kouassi Yao Herman
Personal information
- Full name: Kouassi Yao Herman
- Date of birth: 26 January 1990 (age 36)
- Place of birth: Abidjan, Ivory Coast
- Height: 1.67 m (5 ft 6 in)
- Position: Forward

Team information
- Current team: Angthong
- Number: 71

Senior career*
Years	Team	Apps	(Gls)
2011–2015	Air Force Central	119	(58)
2016–2017	Chiangmai	24	(9)
2017	Bangkok	23	(5)
2018	Samut Sakhon	0	(0)
2018–2019	SHB Đà Nẵng	13	(4)
2019	Than Quảng Ninh F.C.	22	(6)
2023	Samutsongkhram	14	(8)
2023–	Angthong	25	(10)
- * Club domestic league appearances and goals as of 7 April 2024

Kouassi Yao Hermann (born 26 January 1990), known as Yao Hermann Kouassi and Hermann Yao Kouassi, is an Ivorian footballer who plays for Angthong in the Thai League 3 as a forward.

== Career ==
Hermann scored 16 goals for Air Force Central in 2013 as the club were promoted back to the Thai Premier League. On 9 March 2014, he made his debut in the Premier League and scored a consolation goal as Air Force were defeated 5−1 by Police United.

Yao Kouassi scored the game-winning goal for Air Force Central on 17 May 2014, as the club came from 0−1 down to win 2−1. On 31 May, he scored Air Force's second goal in their 2−0 win over Sisaket F.C. On 21 June, he brought his team back from a goal down, scoring a hat-trick to defeat Chainat Hornbill 3−1 in the 19th round of the Thai Premier League. On 23 July, Yao Kouassi scored Air Force's equalizer against Bangkok Glass but a late Suppasek Kaikaew strike won it 3−1 for the Pathum Thani club.

== Career statistics ==
As of 21 September 2014

Club	Season	League			National Cup		League Cup		Total	
Club	Season	Division	Apps	Goals	Apps	Goals	Apps	Goals	Apps	Goals
Air Force Central	2011	Thai Division 1 League	30	12	1	0	1	0	32	12
Air Force Central	2012	Thai Division 1 League	30	20	1	0	2	0	33	20
Air Force Central	2013	Thai Division 1 League	30	16	1	0	3	0	34	16
Air Force Central	2014	Thai Premier League	35	13	1	0	1	0	37	13
Air Force Central	Total		125	61	4	0	7	0	136	61
Career total			125	61	4	0	7	0	136	61

== Honours ==
=== Club ===
Air Force Central

- Thailand Division 1 League

Champions (1): 2013
