= Jeferson (footballer, born 1986) =

Brazilian footballer

Personal information
- Full name: Jeferson Gusmao Maciel
- Date of birth: 20 January 1986 (age 40)
- Place of birth: Brazil
- Height: 1.83 m (6 ft 0 in)
- Position: Centre back

Team information
- Current team: Super Power Samut Prakan
- Number: 13

Senior career*
Years	Team	Apps	(Gls)
2009–2010	Atlético-BA	19	(0)
2011	Goianésia	13	(2)
2011–2012	Feirense	1	(0)
2012	Goianésia	15	(0)
2013	Botafogo	14	(3)
2014–2016	Super Power Samut Prakan	58	(5)
- * Club domestic league appearances and goals

Jeferson Gusmao Maciel (born 20 January 1986) is a Brazilian footballer who currently plays for Osotspa Samut Prakan in the Thai League T1.
