= Serginho (footballer, born 1979) =

Brazilian footballer

Personal information
- Full name: Sérgio Henrique Silva Guedes
- Date of birth: December 8, 1979 (age 46)
- Place of birth: Rio de Janeiro, Brazil
- Height: 1.79 m (5 ft 10 in)
- Position: Defensive midfielder

Youth career
- 2000–2002: Botafogo

Senior career*
Years	Team	Apps	(Gls)
2002	Vitória		
2003	Bangu		
2004	Caxias		
2004	Al-Safaa		
2005–2006	Remo		
2007	Atlético Mineiro	1	(0)
2008–2009	Ituano	18	(0)
2008	→ Vasco da Gama (loan)		
2009–2012	Metropolitano		
2011	→ Sertãozinho (loan)	16	(1)
2012	Santos AP	6	(0)
2013	Sriracha F.C.		
- * Club domestic league appearances and goals

Sérgio Henrique Silva Guedes or simply Serginho (born December 8, 1979) is a Brazilian former professional footballer who played as a defensive midfielder.
