= Kassim Koné =

Ivorian footballer

Personal information
- Full name: Kassim Koné
- Date of birth: 30 December 1986 (age 39)
- Place of birth: Abidjan, Ivory Coast
- Height: 1.89 m (6 ft 2 1/2 in)
- Positions: Striker; attacking midfielder

Senior career*
Years	Team	Apps	(Gls)
2006	Osotspa	9	(1)
2007–2010	Bangkok Glass	68	(28)
- * Club domestic league appearances and goals

Kassim Koné (born 30 December 1986) is an Ivorian former professional footballer.
