= Pusit Phongsura =

Thai footballer (born 1981)

Personal information
- Full name: Pusit Phongsura
- Date of birth: 11 December 1981 (age 44)
- Place of birth: Sisaket, Thailand
- Height: 1.77 m (5 ft 9 1/2 in)
- Position: Goalkeeper

Senior career*
Years	Team	Apps	(Gls)
2006–2012	Sisaket	85	(0)
2013	Samutsongkhram	22	(0)
2014–2016	Sisaket	19	(0)
- * Club domestic league appearances and goals as of 13 April 2010 ‡ National team caps and goals as of 18 April 2010

Pusit Phongsura (Thai: ภูษิต พงษ์สุระ) is a Thai retired footballer.
