= Iván Palanco =

Spanish football manager

Personal information
- Full name: Iván Palanco Santiago
- Date of birth: 12 January 1980 (age 46)
- Place of birth: Mataró, Spain
- Position: Midfielder

Youth career
- Years: Team
- Mataró

Managerial career
- 2013: Ratchaburi
- 2014–2015: Al-Shahania (assistant)
- 2017–2018: Tokyo Verdy (assistant)
- 2019–2020: Cerezo Osaka (assistant)
- 2021–2022: Shimizu S-Pulse (assistant)
- 2022–2023: Vissel Kobe (assistant)
- 2024: Flamengo U17 (assistant)
- 2024: Flamengo U20 (assistant)
- 2024–2026: Flamengo (assistant)

Iván Palanco Santiago (born 12 January 1980) is a Spanish football manager.

== Career ==
Palanco played youth football for Mataró as a midfielder before being forced to retire at the age of 17 due to a serious knee injury. In 2009, he was named technical director of Barcelona's Academy in Fukuoka, Japan.

On 17 July 2013, Palanco was appointed manager of Thai Premier League side Ratchaburi Mitr Phol. He was sacked on 24 December, after three wins in nine matches, and was subsequently replaced by compatriot Ricardo Rodríguez.

From 2014 onwards, Palanco started working with Miguel Ángel Lotina, being his assistant at Al-Shahania, Tokyo Verdy, Cerezo Osaka, Shimizu S-Pulse, Vissel Kobe. Since 2024 Palanco started working with Filipe Luís as assistant manager at Flamengo U17, Flamengo U20 and Flamengo.

== Managerial statistics ==
As of 30 September 2024

Managerial record by team and tenure
Team	Nat.	From	To	Record								Ref
Team	Nat.	From	To	G	W	D	L	GF	GA	GD	Win %	Ref
Ratchaburi	(Thailand)	27 July 2013	15 September 2013	9	3	2	4	11	11	+0	33.33	
Career total				9	3	2	4	11	11	+0	33.33	—
