= Wellington Rocha =

Brazilian-born East Timorese footballer (born 1990)

Personal information
- Full name: Wellington Rocha dos Santos
- Date of birth: 4 October 1990 (age 36)
- Place of birth: São Paulo, Brazil
- Height: 1.90 m (6 ft 3 in)
- Positions: Central defender; left back

Youth career
- 2006: São Paulo
- 2006: Fiorentina
- 2007–2009: Audax São Paulo

Senior career*
Years	Team	Apps	(Gls)
2010	Marília	15	(0)
2011	Atlético Araçatuba	0	(0)
2011	Santacruzense	14	(0)
2011	Itapirense	19	(0)
2012	Ferroviária	10	(0)
2013	Cotia	27	(0)
2013	Bangkok	21	(0)
2014–2015	PSIR Rembang	15	(0)
2016	FC Gifu	0	(0)

International career
2011	Timor-Leste U23	4	(0)
2012	Timor-Leste	4	(0)
- * Club domestic league appearances and goals as of 10 October 2012

Wellington Rocha dos Santos, known as Wellington Rocha or Rocha inside Brazil (born 4 October 1990) is a Brazilian-born East Timorese football player who plays as a central defender. He last played for F.C. Gifu. He played for Timor-Leste national team.

== International career ==
Naturalized citizen of East Timor, Rocha made his senior international debut on 5 October 2012 in a 2012 AFF Suzuki Cup qualification match against Cambodia national football team.
