= Zezinando =

Bissau-Guinean/Portuguese footballer

Personal information
- Full name: Zezinando Odelfrides Gomes Correia
- Date of birth: 1 January 1987 (age 39)
- Place of birth: Bissau, Guinea-Bissau
- Height: 1.72 m (5 ft 8 in)
- Position: Midfielder

Team information
- Current team: Trat
- Number: 8

Youth career
- 1998–1999: Farense
- 1999–2006: Sporting CP

Senior career*
Years	Team	Apps	(Gls)
2006–2009	Sporting CP	0	(0)
2006–2007	→ Estoril (loan)	22	(0)
2007–2008	→ Atlético (loan)	25	(0)
2008–2009	→ Real Massamá (loan)	17	(0)
2009–2010	Estrela Amadora	26	(0)
2011–2012	Samut Songkhram	15	(0)
2013–2014	Air Force Central	20	(0)
2015–	Trat	0	(0)

International career
2005–2006	Portugal U19	12	(1)
2006–2007	Portugal U20	13	(0)
- * Club domestic league appearances and goals as of 00:00, 23 March 2015 (UTC)

Zezinando Odelfrides Gomes Correia (born 1 January 1987), known simply as Zezinando, is a Portuguese footballer who plays for Thai club Trat F.C. as a defensive midfielder.

== Club career ==
Born in Bissau, Zezinando moved with his parents to Portugal still an infant, and, at the age of 12, he joined Sporting Clube de Portugal's famed youth academy. In the following three years, he would only collect some appearances for the Lions during preseason, being successively loaned to clubs in the Lisbon area, appearing in the 2006–07 season in the second division with G.D. Estoril Praia and playing in the third level in the following years.

On 26 June 2009, Zezinando underwent a trial at Heart of Midlothian of Scotland alongside compatriot João Moreira. An eventual deal fell through, and both signed with C.F. Estrela da Amadora in the third tier of Portuguese football.

In late October 2011, after more than one year without a club, Zezinando joined Samut Songkhram F.C. in the Thai Premier League.

== International career ==
Zezinando chose to represent Portugal internationally. He appeared with the under-20s at the 2007 FIFA World Cup in Canada, playing all four matches in an eventual round-of-16 exit.

== Honours ==
Air Force Central

- Thai Division 1 League: 2013
