= Jozef Tirer =

Slovak footballer (born 1984)

Personal information
- Date of birth: 20 February 1984 (age 42)
- Place of birth: Slovakia
- Position: Midfielder

Team information
- Current team: TSU Hafnerbach
- Number: 16

Senior career*
Years	Team	Apps	(Gls)
–2007	MFK Zemplín Michalovce		
2007	FC Hlučín		
2007–2009	FK Železiarne Podbrezová		
2009–2010	MFK Zemplín Michalovce		
2010–2011	TOT S.C.		
2011	Nakhon Ratchasima F.C.		
2011–2013	Bangkok F.C.		
2013	PTT Rayong F.C.		
2013–2014	Air Force Central F.C.	8	(0)
2014	Roi Et United F.C.		
2014–2015	Ubon UMT United F.C.		
2015	Ayutthaya F.C.	2+	
2016–2017	1.FK Svidník		
2017–	TSU Hafnerbach	25	(33)
- * Club domestic league appearances and goals

Jozef Tirer (born 20 February 1984 on Slovakia) is a Slovak footballer who plays for TSU Hafnerbach of the Austrian Regional Leagues as of 2017.

== Career in Thailand ==
Resorting to a Thai club in 2009 on account of having to wait longer to sign for a Slovak team, Tirer started out with TOT S.C. of the Thai Premier League that year. He then represented Nakhon Ratchasima, Bangkok F.C., and PTT Rayong which were in the lower divisions of Thai football at the time.

While playing for Air Force Central in the 2014 Thai Premier League, the Slovak midfielder illegitimately hit the ball with his hand into the goal to make the score 2-2 opposing PTT Rayong. However, the goal counted and he later apologized for the incident.

Comparing the best Thai sides to the outfits in his native Slovakia, Tirer claimed that they would be among the higher-level Slovak teams.

Did not perform well for Ayutthaya F.C. in 2015 which resulted in his eventual release.
