= Jason Withe =

English football manager (born 1971)

Personal information
- Date of birth: 16 August 1971 (age 55)
- Place of birth: Liverpool, England
- Position: Striker

Youth career
- 1986–1989: West Bromwich Albion

Senior career*
Years	Team	Apps	(Gls)
1989–1990	West Bromwich Albion		
1990	KPV Kokkola	3	(0)
1990–1991	Burnley		
1991	Crewe Alexandra		
1991–1992	Stockport County		
1992	Stafford Rangers		
1992	Cambridge United		
1992–1994	Telford United		

Managerial career
- 1999–2001: BEC Tero Sasana
- 2001: Thailand (Assistant)
- 2001–2002: Home United
- 2003–2005: Bangkok Bank
- 2005–2007: Indonesia (Assistant)
- 2014: Songkhla United
- 2015: Nakhon Pathom United
- 2016–2017: Sukhothai (Club Director)
- 2017: Super Power Samut Prakan
- 2018: Deffo
- 2021–: United City
- * Club domestic league appearances and goals ‡ National team caps and goals as of 3 July 2008

Jason Withe (born 16 August 1971) is an English former football player, turned coach and manager.

== Playing career ==
Withe spent 1986 to 1990 with West Bromwich Albion before spending some time in Finland with KPV Kokkola in 1990. Returning to England, he played for Stafford Rangers, Stockport County, Crewe Alexandra, Burnley and Telford United.

== Coaching career ==
Withe first coached at Birmingham City where he was Community Football Director which was followed by time with Aston Villa where he worked as a coach educator. He was also employed as a Football Association (FA) tutor teaching potential coaches.

=== Asia ===
Withe was Head Coach of Thailand Premier League side BEC Tero Sasana, leading the side to domestic double in 1999–2000. He moved to Singapore to become manager of Home United which plays in the S-League where he steered them to second place in 2002. A moved back to Thailand followed as Technical Director and then Head Coach of Bangkok Bank FC.

In 2005, he became Assistant National Team Manager for the Indonesia Football Association.

=== Return to the UK ===
Withe moved back to the UK where he obtained his UEFA Pro Licence in 2006 and in 2007 became Head of Youth for Aldershot Town. He then scouted for Norwich City. During this period he was also chairman of Knowle.

A spell as Director of Football for Southam United followed in 2010.

He was appointed as the centre director of Leicester City Girls Centre of Excellence in June 2011.

=== Back to Asia ===
As of November 2019, he was a coach with the Singapore-based youth football academy, JSSL Singapore.

Philippines Football League team United City announced on 30 March 2021, that they have hired Withe as their head coach. He is expected to take part in the club's 2021 AFC Champions League campaign, although he would take an informal role of being a consultant to Filipino coach Frank Muescan as Musescan lacks the appropriate license to coach a club in the continental tournament.

== Personal life ==
Withe is the son of former Aston Villa striker and European Cup winner Peter Withe.

== Honours ==
=== Manager ===
BEC Tero Sasana

- Thailand Premier League: 2000
- Kor Royal Cup: 2000

Home United

- S.League runner-up: 2002

Indonesia

- Pestabola Merdeka runner-up: 2006

Sukhothai

- Thailand FA Cup: 2016
