= Arjhan Srong-ngamsub =

Thai football manager

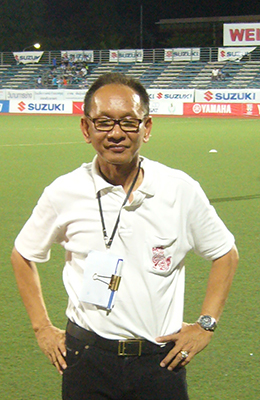
- Arjhan in 2013

Personal information
- Full name: Arjhan Srong-ngamsub
- Date of birth: 2 June 1952 (age 74)
- Place of birth: Prachinburi, Thailand

Managerial career
- Years: Team
- 1981–1988: Bangkok Bank
- 19??–19??: Krung Thai Bank
- 1996: Stock Exchange of Thailand
- 1996: Thailand
- 2002: Thailand (assistant coach)
- 2003–2005: Hoang Anh Gia Lai
- 2005: Binh Dinh
- 2007–2009: Osotsapa
- 2009–2010: Phuket
- 2011: Bangkok Glass
- 2012: Air Force United
- 2012: Thailand U19
- 2012–2013: Nakhon Ratchasima
- 2015: Siam Navy
- ‡ National team caps and goals as of February 27, 2012

Arjhan Srong-ngamsub (Thai: อาจหาญ ทรงงามทรัพย์) is a Thai football coach. He coached the Thailand national football team at the 1996 AFC Asian Cup. He is nicknamed "Kongbeng" (Zhuge Liang in Thai).

== Honours ==
Bangkok Bank

- Kor Royal Cup (Thai: ถ้วย ก.) Winner (3):1981, 1984, 1986
- Queen's Cup Winner (1): 1983
- Thailand FA Cup Winner (1): 1981
- League Cup Winner (1): 1988

Krung Thai Bank

- Khǒr Royal Cup (Thai: ถ้วย ข.) Winner (1): 1993
- League Cup Winner (1): 1992

Hoang Anh Gia Lai

- V.League Champions (2): 2003, 2004
- Vietnamese Super Cup Winner (1): 2003

Phuket

- 2010 Thai Division 2 League Southern Region Champions (1): 2010
