= Chatchai Paholpat =

Thai footballer and manager (born 1947)

Personal information
- Full name: Chatchai Paholpat
- Date of birth: 30 April 1947 (age 79)
- Place of birth: Bangkok, Thailand
- Position: Striker

Senior career*
Years	Team	Apps	(Gls)
1963–1980	Bangkok Bank		

International career
1966–1974	Thailand		

Managerial career
- 1990–1992: Bangkok Bank
- 1992–2000: Thailand (Youth)
- 2004: Thailand
- 1996–2006: Osotsapa FC
- 2006–2007: Hoang Anh Gia Lai
- 2008: Customs Department FC
- 2009: Hoang Anh Gia Lai
- 2013: Pattaya United
- 2014–2015: Muangthong United (youth)
- 2016–: Nong Bua Lamphu (advisor)
Medal record
Representing Thailand
Men's football
AFC Asian Cup
Third place	1972 Thailand
- * Club domestic league appearances and goals

Chatchai Paholpat (Thai ชัชชัย พหลแพทย์) is a former Thailand national football team player and head coach of Thailand national team in 2004. Currently, He has been the head coach of Thailand Premier League side Customs Department FC. He has led the side to the Thailand Division 1 League title in 2008.

He made several appearances for the Thailand national football team, including four 1974 FIFA World Cup qualifying matches. He also played for Thailand at the 1968 Summer Olympics in Mexico.

Chatchai was also head coach of the national team in 2004 and led the side in the 2004 Asian Cup in China.

== Sides managed ==
- Bangkok Bank FC: 1990-1992
- Thailand national football team: 2004
- Osotsapa FC:1996-2006
- Hoang Anh Gia Lai:2007
- Customs Department FC: 2008
- Hoang Anh Gia Lai:2009
- Pattaya United:2013

== Honours ==
- Thailand Premier League: Runner-up (2006) Third Place (2004, 2005)
- Queen's Cup: Champions (2004)

Preceded by Somchad Yimsiri	Thailand national team head coach 1994–1995	Succeeded by Thawatchai Sajakul
Preceded by Carlos Roberto de Carvalho	Thailand national team head coach 2004–2004	Succeeded by Sigfried Held
