= Pairoj Borwonwatanadilok =

Thai footballer and manager

Personal information
- Full name: Pairoj Borwonwatanadilok
- Date of birth: 8 October 1967 (age 59)
- Place of birth: Bangkok, Thailand
- Position: Midfielder

Youth career
- 1986–1989: Srinakharinwirot University

Senior career*
Years	Team	Apps	(Gls)
1989–1999	Osotspa		
2001	Osotspa		

Managerial career
- 2008–2009: Osotspa (assistant)
- 2010–2013: Osotspa
- 2013: Thailand (assistant)
- 2014: Bangkok
- 2015: Saraburi
- 2016: Super Power Samut Prakan
- 2017: BBCU
- 2017–2018: Sukhothai
- 2018: Suphanburi
- 2018–2019: Muangthong United
- 2019: Sukhothai
- 2021–2022: Chiangmai
- 2022: Khonkaen United
- * Club domestic league appearances and goals ‡ National team caps and goals as of September 30, 2012

Pairoj Borwonwatanadilok (Thai: ไพโรจน์ บวรวัฒนดิลก) (born 8 October 1967), simply known as Bae (Thai: เบ๊), is a Thai professional football manager and former footballer.

== Managerial statistics ==
As of match played 27 November 2022

Managerial record by team and tenure
Team	From	To	Record				
Team	From	To	P	W	D	L	Win %
Osotspa	24 March 2010	25 May 2013	11	2	4	5	18.2
Saraburi	1 June 2015	30 November 2015	22	7	9	6	31.8
Super Power Samut Prakan	28 April 2016	8 November 2016	23	7	5	11	30.4
Sukhothai	13 March 2017	21 May 2018	47	14	16	17	29.8
Suphanburi	29 June 2018	21 November 2018	15	6	3	6	40.0
Muangthong United	22 November 2018	31 March 2019	5	2	0	3	40.0
Sukhothai	1 August 2019	27 October 2019	9	2	5	2	22.2
Chiangmai	7 May 2021	28 February 2022	27	8	6	13	29.6
Khonkaen United	2 November 2022 (Note: Borwonwatanadilok's appointment was announced on 2 November 2022, the same day as Khon Kaen's 0–3 defeat to Lamphun Warriors, which was taken by caretaker managers Supagorn Siripornpant and Diogo Figueira.)	28 November 2022	5	1	4	0	20.0
Total			164	49	52	63	29.9

^{1} Results from penalty shoot-outs are counted as draws in this table.

== Honours ==
Manager
Thailand U-23 Selection

- BIDC Cup 2013 (Cambodia) Winner (1): 2013
