= Yuttana Chaikaew =

Thai footballer (born 1981)

Personal information
- Full name: Yuttana Chaikaew
- Date of birth: 26 February 1981 (age 45)
- Place of birth: Songkhla, Thailand
- Height: 1.74 m (5 ft 8 1/2 in)
- Positions: Midfielder; forward

Team information
- Current team: Pattani
- Number: 10

Youth career
- Krung Thai Bank

Senior career*
| Years | Team | Apps | (Gls) |
| 1999–2008 | Krung Thai Bank | 216 | (71) |
| 2009 | Thai Port | 10 | (2) |
| 2009 | Police United | 3 | (0) |
| 2010 | TOT | 8 | (1) |
| 2011–2014 | PTT Rayong | 47 | (20) |
| 2015–2017 | Songkhla United | 57 | (5) |
| 2018– | Pattani | | |
- * Club domestic league appearances and goals as of 14 November 2008

Yuttana Chaiyakaew (Thai: ยุทธนา ไชยแก้ว, born February 26, 1981) is a Thai professional footballer. He currently plays for Pattani in the Thai League 4.

He played for Krung Thai Bank in the 2008 AFC Champions League group stages.
