= Chalermwoot Sa-ngapol =

Thai footballer and manager (born 1958)

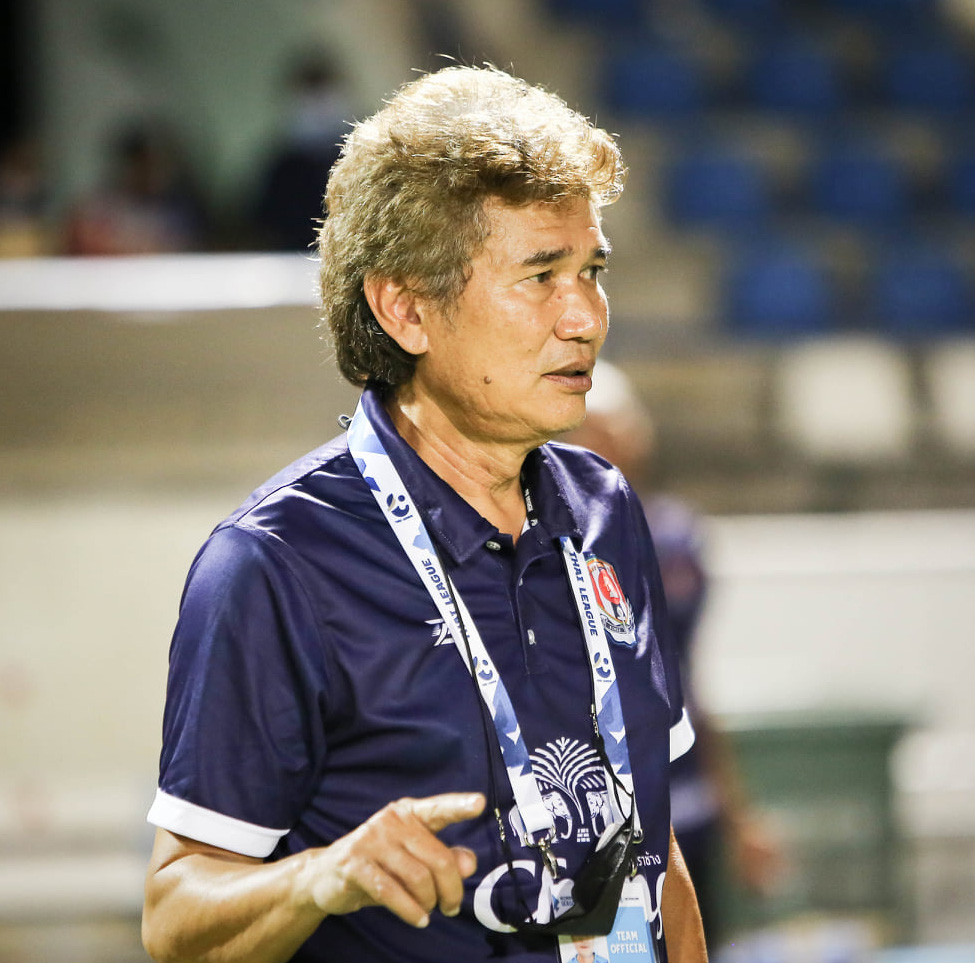
- Chalermwoot Sa-ngapol managing Navy.

Personal information
- Full name: Chalermwoot Sa-ngapol
- Date of birth: 2 October 1958 (age 68)
- Place of birth: Bangkok, Thailand
- Position: Midfielder

Youth career
- 1972–1975: Patumkongka School

Senior career*
Years	Team	Apps	(Gls)
1976–1996	Bangkok Bank	416	(102)
1997	Thai Tobacco Monopoly	4	(0)
Total		420	(102)

International career
1979–1990	Thailand		

Managerial career
- 1999–2000: Bangkok Bank
- 2002–2005: Bangkok Bank
- 2006: Thai Honda Ladkrabang
- 2008–2010: Ratchaburi (youth)
- 2009: Thailand U19
- 2011–2013: Pattaya United
- 2013–2014: Osotsapa
- 2014–2016: Sisaket
- 2016: Thailand U19
- 2016–2017: Super Power Samut Prakan
- 2017: Sisaket
- 2017: Udon Thani
- 2018: Sukhothai
- 2019: Ayutthaya United
- 2019: Nakhon Ratchasima
- 2020–2021: Navy
- 2021–2022: Navy
- 2022: Udon Thani
Medal record
Men's football
Representing Thailand
Southeast Asian Games
Gold medal – first place	1981 Philippines	Team
Gold medal – first place	1983 Singapore	Team
Gold medal – first place	1985 Thailand	Team
Bronze medal – third place	1987 Indonesia	Team
- * Club domestic league appearances and goals as of 26 July 2008

Chalermwoot Sa-ngapol (Thai เฉลิมวุฒิ สง่าพล) (born October 2, 1958) is a Thai football manager and former player for the Thailand national team. He was the midfielder who has been described as the "Glenn Hoddle of Thai football" with his precise passing and from open play and set pieces. He scored 18 goals for the national team.

Chalermwoot was elect as one of the all star players of the AFC In 1986. After he retired from the footballer in 1990, he adjust his job to the head coach of the Bangkok Bank FC in 1999.

== Honours ==
=== Manager ===
Bangkok Bank F.C.

- Thai FA Cup: 1999
- Queen's Cup: 2000
- Asian Cup Winners' Cup 3rd Place: 1999–2000

Thailand U19

- AFF U-19 Youth Championship : 2009

== International goals ==
#	Date	Venue	Opponent	Score	Result	Competition
1.	August 29, 1980	Seoul, South Korea	Malaysia	4-1	Won	Friendly Tournament
2.	December 17, 1985	Bangkok, Thailand	Singapore	2-0	Won	1985 Southeast Asian Games
3.	December 17, 1985	Bangkok, Thailand	Singapore	2-0	Won	1985 Southeast Asian Games
