= 2016 BBCU F.C. season =

BBCU
2016 season
- Chairman: Wirayut Potaramik
- Manager: Jatuporn Pramualban
- Stadium: Nonthaburi Youth Centre Stadium
- Thai League: ?
- Thai FA Cup: ?
- Thai League Cup: Round of 32
Home colours	Away colours

The 2016 season is the final time BBCU in the Thai Premier League since 2012.

The club placed 18th in the league standings and was relegated.

== Players ==
=== Current squad ===
Note: Flags indicate national team as defined under FIFA eligibility rules; some limited exceptions apply. Players may hold more than one non-FIFA nationality.

No.	Pos.	Nation	Player
1	GK	THA	Pacharaphol Tanormkiattikorn
2	DF	THA	Woranet Tornueng
3	DF	THA	Boonyarit Pathomthad
4	MF	THA	Naruphon Putsorn
5	DF	THA	Pavarit Sansook
6	MF	THA	Wisanusak Oun-noi
7	FW	THA	Chad Chaiyabutr
8	MF	THA	Nakul Pinthong (Captain)
9	FW	KOR	Woo Geun-jeong
10	MF	THA	Aphisorn Poomchart
11	DF	THA	Mongkol Woraprom
12	MF	THA	Netipong Narkchim
13	MF	THA	Naret Ritpitakwong
14	MF	THA	Pummared Kladkleeb
15	DF	THA	Teerachai Thampien

No.	Pos.	Nation	Player
16	DF	THA	Maitree Kularbkao
17	MF	THA	Kiatisak Jia-udom
18	GK	THA	Pornchai Chan-In
19	DF	THA	Jatuporn Klai-eiem
22	GK	THA	Sarayut Poolsab
23	DF	KOR	Ma Sang-hoon
24	MF	THA	Teerapong Kerdcharoenporn
25	MF	THA	Natthikorn Yaprom
26	DF	THA	Piyawit Janput
27	MF	NGR	Julius Oiboh
30	DF	CMR	Dooh Moukoko
32	GK	THA	Teerapong Puttasukha
34	FW	THA	Akarawin Sawasdee
40	MF	CIV	Diarra Ali

== Thai Premier League ==
Toyota Thai Premier League

Date	Opponents	H / A	Result F–A	Scorers	League position
6 March 2016	Ratchaburi Mitr Phol	A	0–2		17th
9 March 2016	Sisaket	H	2–0	Aphisorn 10' , Julius 27'	10th
12 March 2016	Navy	A	0–1		13th
16 March 2016	Nakhon Ratchasima Mazda	H	2–4	Geun-jeong 53' , Chalermpong 66' (o.g.)	16th
30 March 2016	Chiangrai United	H	3–4	Geun-jeong 72' 84' , Julius 90+1'	17th
2 April 2016	Bangkok United	A	0–1		17th
24 April 2016	Suphanburi	H	2–3	Geun-jeong 7' 54'	18th
27 April 2016	Pattaya United	A	2–3	Geun-jeong 12' , Julius 43'	18th
30 April 2016	Buriram United	H	0–2		18th
8 May 2016	Sukhothai	A	1–4	Geun-jeong 38' (pen.)	18th
11 May 2016	Chainat Hornbill	A	1–3	Naruphon 25'	18th
15 May 2016	Osotspa M-150 Samut Prakan	H	1–1	Geun-jeong 82'	18th
21 May 2016	Army United	A	0–2		18th
28 May 2016	SCG Muangthong United	H	1–2	Naret 46'	18th
11 June 2016	BEC Tero Sasana	A	0–1		18th
18 June 2016	Chonburi	H	1–1	Julius 3'	18th
22 June 2016	Bangkok Glass	A	1–3	Julius 78'	18th
25 June 2016	Ratchaburi Mitr Phol	H	3–1	Sang-hoon 51' , Julius 83' , Naret 89'	18th
29 June 2016	Sisaket	A	0–0		18th
2 July 2016	Navy	H	0–1		18th
10 July 2016	Chiangrai United	A	2–2	Sang-hoon 20' , Naruphon 32'	18th
17 July 2016	Bangkok United	H			
20 July 2016	Suphanburi	A			
17 July 2016	Pattaya United	H			

== Thai FA Cup ==
Chang FA Cup

Date	Opponents	H / A	Result F–A	Scorers	Round
15 June 2016	Chiangrai United	A	1–6	Kazuki 62'	Round of 64

== Thai League Cup ==
Toyota League Cup

Date	Opponents	H / A	Result F–A	Scorers	Round
9 April 2016	Nakhon Sawan	A	3–1 (a.e.t.)	Aphisorn 82' , Pummared 99' 113'	Round of 64
8 June 2016	Lampang	A	0–1		Round of 32
