= 2016 Thai League T1 =

Thai League T1
- Season: 2016
- Champions: Muangthong United
- Relegated: Army United; Chainat Hornbill; BBCU
- AFC Champions League: Muangthong United; Bangkok United; Sukhothai
- Matches: 277
- Goals: 830 (3 per match)
- Top goalscorer: Cleiton Silva (27 goals)
- Biggest home win: Ratchaburi Mitr Phol 6–0 Pattaya United (22 May 2016)
- Biggest away win: Pattaya 0–5 Sisaket (28 May 2016)
- Highest scoring: Muangthong 8–3 Super Power (22 June 2016)
- Longest winning run: 14 matches Muangthong United
- Longest unbeaten run: 20 matches Bangkok United
- Longest winless run: 15 matches BBCU
- Longest losing run: 9 matches BBCU
- Highest attendance: 32,600; Buriram 3–2 Chonburi (15 April 2016)
- Lowest attendance: 289; Muangthong United 5–1 BBCU (18 September 2016)
- Total attendance: 1,503,600
- Average attendance: 5,428

The 2016 Thai League T1 (also known as the Toyota Thai League for sponsorship reasons) was the 20th season of the Thai League T1, the top Thai professional league for association football clubs, since its establishment in 1996. A total of 18 teams competed in the league. The season started on 5 March 2016.

Buriram United are the defending champions, having won the Thai Premier League title the three consecutive seasons.

Following the death of King Bhumibol Adulyadej, the Football Association of Thailand cancelled the remaining league season on 14 October 2016, with three rounds remaining. Muangthong United were therefore crowned champions with BBCU, Chainat and Army United relegated.

The following day however (15 October), FAT appeared to do a U-turn and announced that further discussions with key stake holders would determine whether the league campaign would continue. These discussions were required as teams that were in the relegation places at the time of the original announcement were voicing their concerns.

On the 16 October, after a meeting of all top flight league clubs it was announced that the original decision to cancel the remaining games would stay in place, therefore crowning Muangthong United as champions for the 4th time.

== Teams ==
Locations of the 2016 Thai League teams
Football clubs in Bangkok Metropolitan Region

A total of 18 teams will contest the league, including 15 sides from the 2015 season and three promoted from the 2015 Thai Division 1 League.

TOT and Port were relegated to the 2016 Thai Division 1 League after finishing the 2015 season. 14th-placed Saraburi withdrew from the league after the season, sparing BEC Tero Sasana from relegation. They were replaced by the best three teams from the 2015 Thai Division 1 League runners-up Pattaya United, third place Sukhothai and fourth place BBCU.

=== Stadiums and locations ===
Note: Table lists in alphabetical order.

Team	Province	Stadium	Capacity	Ref.
Army United	Bangkok	Thai Army Sports Stadium	20,000	
Bangkok Glass	Pathumthani	Leo Stadium	14,000	
Bangkok United	Pathumthani	Thammasat Stadium	25,000	
BBCU	Nonthaburi	Nonthaburi Youth Centre Stadium	6,000	
BEC Tero Sasana	Bangkok	72-years Anniversary Stadium	10,000	
Buriram United	Buriram	New I-Mobile Stadium	32,600	
Chainat Hornbill	Chainat	Khao Plong Stadium	12,000	
Chiangrai United	Chiangrai	United Stadium of Chiangrai	15,000	
Chonburi	Chonburi	Chonburi Stadium	8,500	
Muangthong United	Nonthaburi	SCG Stadium	15,000	
Nakhon Ratchasima	Nakhon Ratchasima	80th Birthday Stadium	28,000	
Navy	Chonburi	Sattahip Navy Stadium	12,500	
Pattaya United	Chonburi	Dolphins Stadium	5,000	
Ratchaburi Mitr Phol	Ratchaburi	Mitr Phol Stadium	13,000	
Sisaket	Sisaket	Sri Nakhon Lamduan Stadium	10,000	
Sukhothai	Sukhothai	Thung Thalay Luang Stadium	8,000	
Super Power Samut Prakan	Samut Prakan	M-Power Stadium	4,100	
Suphanburi	Suphanburi	Suphanburi Municipality Stadium	25,000	

=== Name changes ===
- Osotspa Samut Prakan renamed themselves to Super Power Samut Prakan.

=== Stadium changes ===
- Bangkok United used the Thammasat Stadium in Pathumthani, a change from the previous season where they used the Thai-Japanese Stadium in Bangkok as their home ground in 2015.
- Ratchaburi Mitr Phol will use the Mitr Phol Stadium in June 2016, a change from the previous season where they used the Ratchaburi Stadium in Ratchaburi as their home ground in 2015.
- Sukhothai used the TOT Stadium Chaeng Watthana in Bangkok for the visit of Buriram United due to a home stadium ban.
- Muangthong United used the Supachalasai Stadium in Bangkok for the visit of BBCU due to a home stadium ban.

=== Personnel and sponsoring ===
Note: Flags indicate national team as has been defined under FIFA eligibility rules. Players may hold more than one non-FIFA nationality.

Team	Head coach	Captain	Kit manufacturer	Main sponsor
Army United	(Thailand) Watcharakorn Antakhamphu	(Thailand) Chaiwat Nak-iem	Sakka Sport	Chang
Bangkok Glass	(Australia) Aurelio Vidmar	(Australia) Matt Smith	Nike	Leo Beer
Bangkok United	(Brazil) Alexandré Pölking	(Thailand) Wittaya Madlam	Ari Football	True
BBCU	(Thailand) Jatuporn Pramualban	(Thailand) Naruphon Putsorn	Ego Sports	3BB
BEC Tero Sasana	(Thailand) Surapong Kongthep	(Thailand) Apichet Puttan	FBT	FB Battery
Buriram United	(Serbia) Ranko Popović	(Thailand) Suchao Nutnum	Made by club	Chang
Chainat Hornbill	(Thailand) Worakorn Wichanarong	(Thailand) Pisan Dorkmaikaew	Warrix Sports	Wangkanai
Chiangrai United	(Thailand) Teerasak Po-on	(Thailand) Pichitphong Choeichiu	Made by club	Singha Park
Chonburi	(Thailand) Therdsak Chaiman	(Thailand) Chonlatit Jantakam	Nike	Chang
Muangthong United	(Thailand) Totchtawan Sripan	(Thailand) Teerasil Dangda	Grand Sport	SCG
Nakhon Ratchasima	(Serbia) Miloš Joksić	(Thailand) Chalermpong Kerdkaew	Grand Sport	Mazda
Navy	(Brazil) Stefano Cugurra	(Thailand) Nataporn Phanrit	Made by club	HR-Pro
Pattaya United	(South Korea) Kim Hak-chul	(Thailand) Tanasak Srisai	Tamudo	Nongnaka
Ratchaburi Mitr Phol	(Spain) Pacheta	(Brazil) Carlos	Ari Football	Mitr Phol
Sisaket	(Japan) Masahiro Wada	(Thailand) Ekkapan Jandakorn	Made by club	Muang Thai
Sukhothai	(Thailand) Somchai Chuayboonchum	(Thailand) Yuttapong Srilakorn	Mawin	Chang
Super Power Samut Prakan	(Thailand) Pairoj Borwonwatanadilok	(Thailand) Jetsada Puanakunmee	Grand Sport	M-150
Suphanburi	(Brazil) Sérgio Farias	(Thailand) Rangsan Viwatchaichok	Warrix Sports	Chang

=== Managerial changes ===
Team	Outgoing manager	Manner of departure	Date of vacancy	Table	Incoming manager	Date of appointment
Chonburi	(Thailand) Jadet Meelarp	End of Contract	14 December 2015	Pre-season	(Thailand) Therdsak Chaiman	21 December 2015
Super Power Samut Prakan	(Thailand) Kritsada Piandit	End of Contract	14 December 2015	Pre-season	(Thailand) Somchai Subpherm	14 December 2015
Ratchaburi Mitr Phol	(Spain) Josep Ferré	End of Contract	14 December 2015	Pre-season	(Spain) Pacheta	5 January 2016
Sisaket	(Thailand) Chalermwoot Sa-Ngapol	End of Contract	14 December 2015	Pre-season	(Serbia) Božidar Bandović	5 January 2016
Suphanburi	(Thailand) Worrawoot Srimaka	End of caretaker role	14 December 2015	Pre-season	(Brazil) Sérgio Alexandre	6 January 2016
Muangthong United	(Croatia) Dragan Talajić	Sacked	19 January 2016	Pre-season	(Thailand) Totchtawan Sripan	20 January 2016
BEC Tero Sasana	(Thailand) Rangsan Viwatchaichok	End of caretaker role	27 January 2016	Pre-season	(Serbia) Branko Smiljanić	5 February 2016
Suphanburi	(Brazil) Sérgio Alexandre	Sacked	21 March 2016	4th	(Spain) Ricardo Rodríguez	22 March 2016
BBCU	(Japan) Koichi Sugiyama	Sacked	25 April 2016	18th	(Thailand) Jatuporn Pramualban	23 May 2016
Chainat Hornbill	(Thailand) Issara Sritaro	Sacked	25 April 2016	16th	(Japan) Koichi Sugiyama	28 April 2016
Super Power Samut Prakan	(Thailand) Somchai Subpherm	Resigned	28 April 2016	16th	(Thailand) Pairoj Borwonwatanadilok	28 April 2016
BEC Tero Sasana	(Serbia) Branko Smiljanić	Sacked	11 May 2016	12th	(Thailand) Surapong Kongthep	12 May 2016
Nakhon Ratchasima	(Japan) Sugao Kambe	Moved to technical director	12 May 2016	16th	(Serbia) Miloš Joksić	29 May 2016
Buriram United	(Brazil) Alexandre Gama	Sacked	22 May 2016	3rd	(Iran) Afshin Ghotbi	24 May 2016
Pattaya United	(Serbia) Miloš Joksić	Signed by Nakhon Ratchasima	29 May 2016	12th	(South Korea) Kim Hak-chul	27 June 2016
Chainat Hornbill	(Japan) Koichi Sugiyama	Resigned	20 June 2016	17th	(Thailand) Worakorn Wichanarong	20 June 2016
Bangkok Glass	(Thailand) Anurak Srikerd	Resigned	23 June 2016	3rd	(Australia) Aurelio Vidmar	1 August 2016
Suphanburi	(Spain) Ricardo Rodríguez	Resigned	28 June 2016	9th	(Brazil) Sérgio Farias	4 July 2016
Sisaket	(Serbia) Božidar Bandović	Sacked	12 August 2016	11th	(Japan) Masahiro Wada	1 September 2016
Buriram United	(Iran) Afshin Ghotbi	Sacked	20 August 2016	3rd	(Serbia) Ranko Popović	25 August 2016

=== Foreign players ===
The number of foreign players is restricted to five per Thai League T1 team. A team can use four foreign players on the field in each game, including at least one player from the AFC country.

Club	Player 1	Player 2	Player 3	Player 4	AFC Player	Former Player
Army United	(Brazil) Frauches	(Brazil) Josimar	(Japan) Kai Hirano	(Slovakia) Zdenko Kaprálik	(Singapore) Hassan Sunny	(Brazil) Raphael Botti
Bangkok Glass	(Costa Rica) Ariel Rodríguez	(France) Romain Gasmi	(Mali) Kalifa Cissé	(Spain) Toti	(Australia) Matt Smith	(North Macedonia) Darko Tasevski (Namibia) Lazarus Kaimbi
Bangkok United	(Brazil) Gilberto Macena	(Brazil) Leandro Tatu	(North Macedonia) Mario Gjurovski	(Montenegro) Dragan Boškovic	(Bahrain) Jaycee John	(Mali) Kalifa Cissé
BBCU	(Cameroon) Dooh Moukoko	(Ivory Coast) Diarra Ali	(Nigeria) Julius Oiboh	(South Korea) Ma Sang-hoon	(South Korea) Woo Geun-jeong	
BEC Tero Sasana	(Poland) Łukasz Gikiewicz	(Serbia) Miloš Bosančić	(Serbia) Milan Bubalo	(Serbia) Sreten Sretenović	(Japan) Takahiro Kawamura	(Indonesia) Greg Nwokolo (South Korea) Kim Jung-Woo
Buriram United	(Brazil) Diogo	(Brazil) Kaio	(Portugal) Bruno Moreira	(Venezuela) Andrés Túñez	(South Korea) Go Seul-ki	(Brazil) Weslley
Chainat Hornbill	(Brazil) Reis	(France) Sinama Pongolle	(Japan) Kazuto Kushida	(South Korea) Jo Tae-Keun	(Japan) Sho Shimoji	(Brazil) Renan Silva (Brazil) Wesley Alex
Chiangrai United	(Brazil) Wellington Bruno	(Japan) Hironori Saruta	(Japan) Kazuki Murakami	(Namibia) Lazarus Kaimbi	(Australia) Mark Bridge	(Brazil) Danilo Cirino (Brazil) Dennis Murillo
Chonburi	(Brazil) Anderson	(Brazil) Leandro	(Brazil) Rodrigo Vergilio	(Ghana) Prince Amponsah	(South Korea) Kim Jong-pil	
Muangthong United	(Spain) Xisco	(Brazil) Célio Santos	(South Korea) Lee Ho		(Japan) Naoaki Aoyama	(Brazil) Cleiton Silva (France) Michaël N'dri (Spain) Mario
Nakhon Ratchasima	(Germany) Björn Lindemann	(Ghana) Dominic Adiyiah	(Nigeria) Marco Tagbajumi	(Zambia) Noah Chivuta	(Japan) Satoshi Nagano	
Navy	(Brazil) Addison	(Brazil) André Luís	(Brazil) Aron da Silva	(Paraguay) Anggello Machuca	(Indonesia) Victor Igbonefo	(Brazil) Felipe Ferreira
Pattaya United	(Brazil) Antonio Pina	(Brazil) Júnior Negrão	(South Korea) Yoo Jae-ho	(Spain) Fran González	(Lebanon) Soony Saad	(Japan) Yukiya Sugita
Ratchaburi Mitr Phol	(Argentina) Germán Pacheco	(Belgium) Marvin Ogunjimi	(Brazil) Carlos	(Portugal) Yannick Djaló	(Japan) Takuya Murayama	(Timor-Leste) (Brazil) Heberty (Poland) Łukasz Gikiewicz
Sisaket	(Brazil) Chico	(Brazil) Victor Amaro	(Nigeria) Adefolarin Durosinmi	(Serbia) Bojan Dubajić	(Kyrgyzstan) Anton Zemlianukhin	(Bulgaria) Lyuben Nikolov (Hungary) Norbert Csiki
Sukhothai	(Brazil) Alex Rafael	(Brazil) Renan Marques	(Ivory Coast) Bireme Diouf	(Madagascar) Jhon Baggio	(Japan) Hiromichi Katano	
Super Power Samut Prakan	(Brazil) Dennis Murillo	(Brazil) Jeferson	(Ivory Coast) Anthony Komenan	(Namibia) Sydney Urikhob	(South Korea) Lee Hyun-woong	(Brazil) Aron da Silva (South Korea) Ahn Jae-hoon
Suphanburi	(Brazil) Dellatorre	(Brazil) Márcio Rosário	(North Macedonia) Darko Tasevski	(South Korea) Kim Seung-yong	(South Korea) Jung Hoon	(Brazil) Tinga (Spain) Carmelo González

- Former player are the players who were out of Thai League T1 squad/left club in the mid-season transfer window.

== Results ==
=== League table ===
Pos	Team	Pld	W	D	L	GF	GA	GD	Pts	Qualification or relegation
1	Muangthong United (C, Q)	31	26	2	3	73	24	+49	80	2017 AFC Champions League group stage
2	Bangkok United (Q)	31	23	6	2	71	36	+35	75	2017 AFC Champions League preliminary round 2
3	Bangkok Glass	31	18	3	10	62	41	+21	57	
4	Buriram United	30	15	10	5	55	38	+17	55	
5	Chonburi	31	14	9	8	52	33	+19	51	
6	Ratchaburi Mitr Phol	30	14	7	9	52	35	+17	49	
7	Sukhothai (Q)	31	13	6	12	50	44	+6	45	2017 AFC Champions League preliminary round 2 (Note: Qualified as drawn winners of the 2016 Thai FA Cup.)
8	Chiangrai United	31	13	6	12	42	43	−1	45	
9	BEC Tero Sasana	30	12	5	13	42	52	−10	41	
10	Suphanburi	31	10	8	13	33	35	−2	38	
11	Nakhon Ratchasima	31	10	5	16	30	44	−14	35	
12	Pattaya United	31	9	7	15	46	66	−20	34	
13	Sisaket	31	8	9	14	41	52	−11	33	
14	Navy	31	7	10	14	25	40	−15	31	
15	Super Power Samut Prakan	31	8	7	16	45	71	−26	31	
16	Army United (R)	31	8	6	17	34	46	−12	30	Relegation to the 2017 League Division 1
17	Chainat Hornbill (R)	31	8	6	17	46	61	−15	30	Relegation to the 2017 League Division 1
18	BBCU (R)	30	3	4	23	32	69	−37	13	Relegation to the 2017 League Division 1

Updated to match(es) played on 25 September 2016. Source: Thai League
Rules for classification: 1) points; 2) goal difference; 3) number of goals scored.
(C) Champions; (Q) Qualified for the phase indicated; (R) Relegated

=== Positions by round ===
Team ╲ Round	1	2	3	4	5	6	7	8	9	10	11	12	13	14	15	16	17	18	19	20	21	22	23	24	25	26	27	28	29	30	31
Muangthong United	7	3	1	1	3	4	3	2	2	2	1	1	1	1	1	1	1	1	1	1	1	1	1	1	1	1	1	1	1	1	1
Bangkok United	15	12	11	5	2	3	2	1	1	1	2	2	2	2	2	2	2	2	2	2	2	2	2	2	2	2	2	2	2	2	2
Bangkok Glass	1	6	3	2	1	1	4	3	3	3	3	3	4	4	3	3	3	3	3	3	3	3	3	3	3	3	3	4	4	4	3
Buriram United	2	2	2	3	6	2	1	4	4	4	4	5	3	3	4	5	4	4	6	5	5	4	4	4	4	4	4	3	3	3	4
Chonburi	6	8	8	13	9	8	7	10	10	8	10	7	9	9	11	11	8	8	7	7	7	7	7	6	8	7	7	7	5	6	5
Ratchaburi	4	1	4	10	4	5	5	5	6	7	6	9	7	7	6	6	6	6	5	4	4	5	5	5	5	5	6	5	6	5	6
Sukhothai	16	15	16	11	7	7	9	7	5	5	5	4	5	6	7	7	7	7	8	9	8	8	8	8	7	6	5	6	7	7	7
Chiangrai United	8	5	6	6	5	6	6	6	8	9	8	6	6	5	5	4	5	5	4	6	6	6	6	7	6	8	8	8	8	8	8
BEC Tero	11	7	12	8	13	13	11	11	11	12	12	13	14	14	13	13	13	10	9	8	9	9	9	9	9	9	9	9	9	9	9
Suphanburi	14	11	9	4	8	10	8	8	7	6	7	8	8	8	8	8	10	9	10	10	11	12	10	10	10	10	10	10	10	10	10
Nakhon Ratchasima	13	17	14	7	11	11	12	13	14	15	16	17	17	17	16	15	15	15	14	15	15	15	15	14	15	13	11	11	11	11	11
Pattaya United	12	16	17	18	18	18	14	12	12	10	9	10	11	12	12	12	12	13	12	11	13	13	13	12	12	12	13	14	12	14	12
Sisaket	3	9	5	9	11	9	10	9	9	11	11	11	13	11	10	10	9	11	11	12	10	10	11	11	11	11	12	13	14	12	13
Navy	10	14	10	14	16	16	17	15	16	14	14	14	12	13	14	14	14	14	15	14	14	14	14	15	14	15	15	12	15	13	14
Osotspa	18	18	18	15	14	14	15	16	15	16	17	16	15	15	15	16	16	17	17	17	17	17	17	17	17	17	17	17	16	17	15
Army United	5	13	15	17	12	12	13	14	13	13	13	12	10	10	9	9	11	12	13	13	12	11	12	13	13	14	14	15	13	15	16
Chainat Hornbill	9	4	7	12	15	15	16	17	17	17	15	15	16	16	17	17	17	16	16	16	16	16	16	16	16	16	16	16	17	16	17
BBCU	17	10	13	16	17	17	18	18	18	18	18	18	18	18	18	18	18	18	18	18	18	18	18	18	18	18	18	18	18	18	18

Leader and qualification to 2017 AFC Champions League group stage
Qualification to 2017 AFC Champions League - preliminary round 2
Relegation to 2017 Thai Division 1 League

Updated to match(es) played on Sep 2016. Source:

=== Result table ===
Home \ Away	ARM	BKG	BKU	BBC	BEC	BRU	CHA	CRU	CHO	MTU	NAK	NAV	SPSP	PAT	RAT	SIS	SUK	SUP
Army United		0–0	3–4	2–0	2–3	1–2	2–4	1–0	0–2	0–1		2–0	2–0	1–2	1–3	1–1	1–1	0–1
Bangkok Glass	2–0		0–1	3–1	5–1	0–2		3–1	1–1	1–2	2–1	2–0	4–1		3–0	3–1	2–1	3–1
Bangkok United		4–2		1–0	3–0	3–5	3–2	2–0	1–1	3–3	2–1	3–1	1–1	1–1	2–1	6–1	4–2	
BBCU	1–2		2–4			0–2	2–1	3–4	1–1	1–2	2–4	0–1	1–1	2–3	3–1	2–0	0–3	2–3
BEC Tero Sasana	1–2	1–4	2–3	1–0			2–1	1–2	1–3		2–1	1–0	4–1	1–2	0–4	2–1	1–0	2–0
Buriram United	0–1	2–1	0–0	4–0	3–3		0–0	2–1	3–2	0–3	1–0	1–0	1–1	4–2	0–1		5–2	2–2
Chainat Hornbill	1–1	2–3	1–2	3–1		4–4		2–1	1–4	1–2	3–1	1–0	1–3	1–3	2–2	1–0	3–2	1–1
Chiangrai United	2–1	1–3	0–3	2–2	4–2	0–0	1–0			0–3	1–2	2–1	2–0		1–0	3–1	2–0	1–0
Chonburi	1–1	2–1	0–1		1–0		7–2	2–1		0–3	1–1	4–1	3–0	2–1	2–0	4–2	2–2	1–2
Muangthong United		2–0	2–3	5–1	0–1	3–2	2–0	1–0	1–0		4–1	1–1	8–3	4–1	3–0	4–0	2–1	1–0
Nakhon Ratchasima	1–0	1–2	1–1		1–0	2–0	1–0	1–4	0–0	0–1		2–1		1–0	1–0	1–1	1–3	0–0
Navy	1–2	1–0	1–0	1–0	1–1	0–0	0–0	0–0	3–2	0–4	1–0			1–1	0–0	2–0		1–1
Super Power Samut Prakan	3–2	1–2	0–2	4–1	2–3	2–2	4–2	1–2	1–0		1–2	1–0		2–1	4–4	1–1	1–3	0–0
Pattaya United	2–2	2–1	1–2	3–2	2–2	1–3	2–4	3–3	0–2	1–2	4–1		2–0		1–1	0–5	2–4	3–1
Ratchaburi Mitr Phol	3–1	4–3	0–1	2–0	2–0			1–1	0–0	3–1	2–0	2–1	3–0	6–0		4–0		2–1
Sisaket	2–0	3–3	2–4	0–0	0–2	2–2	2–1		1–0	0–1	1–0	1–1	5–1	4–0	1–1		2–0	
Sukhothai	1–0	0–1		4–1	2–2	0–1	2–1	0–0	1–2	0–1	1–0	2–2	5–2	1–0	2–0	1–1		1–0
Suphanburi	1–0	1–2	0–1	2–1	0–0	1–2	1–0	2–0	0–0	0–1	3–1	4–1	2–3	0–0		1–0	2–3	

Updated to match(es) played on 25 September 2016. Source: Thai League
Legend: Blue = home team win; Yellow = draw; Red = away team win.

== Season statistics ==
=== Top scorers ===
As of 25 September 2016.

Rank	Player	Club	Goals
1	(Brazil) Cleiton Silva	Muangthong United	27
2	(Montenegro) Dragan Bošković	Bangkok United	20
2	(Brazil) Júnior Negrão	Pattaya United	20
2	(Timor-Leste) Heberty^{*}	Ratchaburi Mitr Phol	20
5	(Costa Rica) Ariel Rodríguez	Bangkok Glass	19
5	(Bahrain) Jaycee John	Bangkok United	19
7	(Brazil) Josimar	Army United	16
8	(Brazil) Renan Marques	Sukhothai	15
8	(Portugal) Yannick Djaló	Ratchaburi Mitr Phol	15
10	(Thailand) Adisak Kraisorn	Muangthong United	14

- ^{*} Transferred to Al-Shabab after 20 weeks.

=== Top assists ===
As of 25 September 2016.

Rank	Player	Club	Assists
1	(Madagascar) Jhon Baggio	Sukhothai	13
2	(Thailand) Chanathip Songkrasin	Muangthong United	11
3	(Lebanon) Soony Saad	Pattaya United	9
3	(North Macedonia) Mario Gjurovski	Bangkok United	9
5	(Kyrgyzstan) Anton Zemlianukhin	Sisaket	8
5	(Brazil) Wellington	Chiangrai United	8
5	(Thailand) Sarach Yooyen	Muangthong United	8
5	(Spain) Toti	Bangkok Glass	8
5	(Brazil) Cleiton Silva	Muangthong United	8
5	(Nigeria) Adefolarin Durosinmi	Sisaket	8
5	(Thailand) Theerathon Bunmathan	Buriram United, Muangthong United	8
5	(Thailand) Tristan Do	Muangthong United	8

=== Hat-tricks ===
Player	For	Against	Result	Date
(Venezuela) Andrés Túñez	Buriram United	Bangkok United	5–3	6 March 2016
(Montenegro) Dragan Bošković	Bangkok United	Buriram United	3–5	6 March 2016
(Thailand) Teerasil Dangda	Muangthong United	Navy	4–0	2 April 2016
(Timor-Leste) Heberty	Ratchaburi Mitr Phol	Bangkok Glass	4–3	23 April 2016
(Brazil) Cleiton Silva	Muangthong United	Chiangrai United	3–0	7 May 2016
(Brazil) Dennis Murillo	Chiangrai United	Nakhon Ratchasima	4–1	11 May 2016
(Timor-Leste) Heberty	Ratchaburi Mitr Phol	Pattaya United	6–0	22 May 2016
(Timor-Leste) Heberty	Ratchaburi Mitr Phol	Super Power Samut Prakan	4–4	28 May 2016
(Brazil) Cleiton Silva^{4}	Muangthong United	Super Power Samut Prakan	8–3	22 June 2016
(Bahrain) Jaycee John	Bangkok United	BBCU	4–2	17 July 2016
(Bahrain) Jaycee John	Bangkok United	BEC Tero Sasana	3–2	23 July 2016
(Lebanon) Soony Saad	Pattaya United	BBCU	3–2	24 July 2016
(Brazil) Diogo	Buriram United	Chainat Hornbill	4–4	7 August 2016
(Namibia) Sydney Urikhob	Super Power Samut Prakan	BBCU	4–1	20 August 2016
(Brazil) Dennis Murillo	Super Power Samut Prakan	Chainat Hornbill	4–2	10 September 2016
(Brazil) Rodrigo Vergilio	Chonburi	Navy	4–1	11 September 2016
(Brazil) Dellatorre	Suphanburi	Navy	4–1	25 September 2016
(Brazil) Júnior Negrão	Pattaya United	Nakhon Ratchasima	4–1	25 September 2016

=== Clean sheets ===
As of 25 September 2016.

Rank	Player	Club	Clean sheets
1	(Thailand) Kawin Thamsatchanan	Muangthong United	16
2	(Thailand) Siwarak Tedsungnoen	Buriram United	10
2	(Thailand) Sinthaweechai Hathairattanakool	Suphanburi	10
2	(Thailand) Narong Wongthongkam	Navy	10
2	(Thailand) Ukrit Wongmeema	Ratchaburi Mitr Phol	10
6	(Thailand) Kittipong Phuthawchueak	Bangkok United	9
7	(Thailand) Chanin Sae-ear	Chonburi	8
7	(Thailand) Intharat Apinyakool	Chiangrai United	8
7	(Thailand) Kampol Pathom-attakul	Nakhon Ratchasima	8
10	(Thailand) Prasit Padungchok	BEC Tero Sasana	7

== Awards ==
=== Monthly awards ===
Month	Coach of the Month		Player of the Month		Reference
Month	Coach	Club	Player	Club	Reference
March	(Thailand) Teerasak Po-on	Chiangrai United	(Australia) Matt Smith	Bangkok Glass	
April	(Brazil) Alexandré Pölking	Bangkok United	(Thailand) Tanaboon Kesarat	Muangthong United	
May	(Thailand) Totchtawan Sripan	Muangthong United	(Madagascar) Jhon Baggio	Sukhothai	
June	(Thailand) Surapong Kongthep	BEC Tero Sasana	(Brazil) Cleiton Silva	Muangthong United	
July	(Thailand) Somchai Chuayboonchum	Sukhothai	(Bahrain) Jaycee John	Bangkok United	
August–September	(Thailand) Therdsak Chaiman	Chonburi	(Thailand) Kawin Thamsatchanan	Muangthong United	

== Attendances ==
Pos	Team	Total	High	Low	Average	Change
1	Buriram United	248,760	32,600	8,857	15,547	−20.5%
2	Nakhon Ratchasima	173,041	32,159	5,543	11,536	−34.7%
3	Muangthong United	156,434	12,579	289	9,777	+6.6%
4	Suphanburi	143,693	17,512	4,232	8,980	−13.6%
5	Bangkok Glass	89,891	10,713	3,075	5,992	−12.5%
6	Sukhothai	91,232	7,950	4,012	5,702	+45.8%^{†}
7	Chiangrai United	81,171	15,550	1,761	5,411	−4.7%
8	Chonburi	75,319	8,463	3,155	5,021	−16.0%
9	Sisaket	72,261	11,200	2,216	4,817	−9.7%
10	Ratchaburi Mitr Phol	61,631	13,270	2,185	4,402	+8.0%
11	Bangkok United	49,818	11,666	1,121	3,321	+18.1%
12	Navy	46,185	5,319	2,228	3,079	−17.2%
13	Pattaya United	46,344	5,100	1,351	2,896	+24.1%^{†}
14	Chainat Hornbill	39,386	6,144	1,013	2,461	−48.0%
15	Super Power Samut Prakan	36,985	4,983	1,041	2,311	+11.8%
16	Army United	36,707	5,766	1,143	2,294	−12.6%
17	BEC Tero Sasana	29,335	3,461	1,087	1,955	−51.0%
18	BBCU	23,111	3,514	289	1,540	+61.3%^{†}
	League total	1,503,600	32,600	289	5,428	−13.8%

Updated to games played on 25 September 2016
Source: Thai League
Notes:
^{†} Teams played previous season in Division 1

== See also ==
- 2016 Thai Division 1 League
- 2016 Regional League Division 2
- 2016 Football Division 3
- 2016 Thai FA Cup
- 2016 Thai League Cup
- 2016 Kor Royal Cup
- Thai Premier League All-Star Football
- List of foreign Thai League 1 players
