= 2014 Thai Division 1 League =

Thai Division 1 League
- Season: 2014
- Champions: Nakhon Ratchasima
- Promoted: Nakhon Ratchasima; Saraburi; Siam Navy
- Relegated: Roi Et; Phitsanulok; Khonkaen; Sriracha
- Matches played: 306
- Goals scored: 773 (2.53 per match)
- Top goalscorer: (Ivory Coast) Marc Landry Babo (19 goals)
- Biggest home win: Nakhon Ratchasima 6-0 Phitsanulok (30 March 2014); Trat 5-0 Phitsanulok (2 August 2014)
- Biggest away win: Pattaya United 0-4 Ang Thong (12 July 2014)
- Highest scoring: Phuket 4-5 Saraburi (22 June 2014)
- Longest winning run: 4 games Ang Thong; Krabi; Nakhon Ratchasima
- Longest unbeaten run: 13 games Nakhon Ratchasima
- Longest winless run: 34 games Sriracha
- Longest losing run: 13 games Sriracha
- Highest attendance: 24,430; Nakhon Ratchasima 2-1 Ang Thong (31 May 2014)
- Lowest attendance: 170; Sriracha 0-2 Chiangmai (4 June 2014)
- All statistics correct as of 1 November 2014.

2014 Thai League Division 1 (known as Yamaha League 1 for sponsorship reasons) is the 17th season of the League since its establishment in 1997. It is the feeder league for the Thai Premier League. A total of 18 teams will compete in the league this season.

== Changes from last season ==
=== Team changes ===
==== From Division 1 ====
Promoted to Thai Premier League

- Air Force AVIA
- Singhtarua
- PTT Rayong

Relegated to Regional League Division 2

- Rayong
- Rayong United

==== To Division 1 ====
Relegated from Thai Premier League

- Pattaya United

Promoted from Regional League Division 2

- Roi Et United
- Chiangmai
- Phitsanulok
- Ang Thong

== Teams ==
=== Stadia and locations ===
Locations of the 2014 Thai Division 1 League teams
Football clubs in Bangkok Metropolitan Region

Team	Location	Stadium	Capacity	Ref.
Ang Thong	Ang Thong	Ang Thong Stadium	3,800	
Ayutthaya	Ayutthaya	Ayutthaya Stadium	6,000	
Bangkok	Thung Khru, Bangkok	72-years Anniversary Stadium (Bang Mod)	8,000	
BBCU	Nonthaburi	Nonthaburi Youth Centre Stadium	6,000	
Chiangmai	Chiangmai	700th Anniversary Stadium	25,000	
Khonkaen	Khonkaen	Khon Kaen Provincial Administrative Organization Stadium	8,500	
Krabi	Krabi	Krabi Provincial Stadium	6,000	
Nakhon Pathom United	Nakhon Pathom	Nakhon Pathom Municipality Sport School Stadium	2,141	
Nakhon Ratchasima	Nakhon Ratchasima	80th Birthday Stadium	20,141	
Pattaya United	Pattaya	Nongprue Stadium	5,000	
Phuket	Phuket	Surakul Stadium	15,000	
Phitsanulok	Phitsanulok	Phitsanulok Province Stadium	7,000	
Roi Et	Roi Et	Roi Et Province Stadium	5,000	
Saraburi	Saraburi	Saraburi PAO. Stadium	10,000	
Siam Navy	Chonburi	Sattahip Navy Stadium	12,500	
Sriracha Ban Bueng	Chonburi	Institute of Physical Education Chonburi Campus Stadium	12,000	
Trat	Trat	Trat Province Stadium	4,000	
TTM Customs	Samut Prakan	Lad Krabang 54 Stadium	2,000	

=== Personnel and sponsoring ===
Note: Flags indicate national team as has been defined under FIFA eligibility rules. Players may hold more than one non-FIFA nationality.

Team	Shirt sponsor	Kit manufacturer	Captain	Head coach
Ang Thong	CP	Ego Sports	(Thailand) Santat Klinyeesun	(Thailand) Vorawan Chitavanich
Ayutthaya	Gulf	Poom Planet	(Thailand) Sorasak Kaewinta	(Japan) Koichi Sugiyama
Bangkok	M2F	FBT	(Thailand) Tana Sripandorn	(Serbia) Miloš Joksić
BBCU	3BB	Ego Sports	(Thailand) Sarun Samingchai	(Thailand) Worachai Surinsirirat
Chiangmai	Singha	Warrix Sports	(Thailand) Noppadol Wongchan	(Thailand) Somchai Chuayboonchum
Khonkaen	Leo Beer	Grand Sport	(Thailand) Supakorn Karada	(Thailand) Tehwet Kamolsin
Krabi	Thai AirAsia	Ego Sports	(Thailand) Thaweephong Ja-reanroob	(Thailand) Chayaphol Kotchasan
Nakhon Pathom	Chang	Kool	(Thailand) Apisak Kong-on	(England) Peter Withe
Nakhon Ratchasima	Mazda	Warrix Sports	(Thailand) Kraikiat Beadtaku	(Japan) Sugao Kambe
Pattaya United	True	Grand Sport	(Thailand) Thanaphol Huangprakone	(Thailand) Trongyod Klinsrisook
Phitsanulok	Chang	Lotto	(Thailand) Paramet Mardkhuntod	(Thailand) Surachai Jirasirichote
Phuket	Chang	Grand Sport	(Thailand) Wasan Natasan	(Brazil) Reuther Moreira
Roi Et United	Toyota	FBT	(Thailand) Kittipol Paphunga	(Thailand) Jakarat Tonhongsa
Saraburi	Gulf	Kool	(Thailand) Panuwat Yimsa-ngar	(Thailand) Totchtawan Sripan
Siam Navy	Group Avia	FBT	(Thailand) Kusoel Pengpol	(Thailand) Surasak Tungsurat
Sriracha	Espure	FBT	(Japan) Daisuke Tada	(Thailand) Naruphol Kaenson
Trat	CP	Tamudo	(Thailand) Rattaporn Saetan	(Thailand) Krit Singha-preecha
TTM Customs	TTM	Deffo	(Thailand) Teerawut Sanphan	(Thailand) Jatuporn Pramualban

=== Foreign players ===
The number of foreign players is restricted to seven per DIV1 team, including a slot for a player from AFC countries. A team can use four foreign players on the field in each game, including at least one player from the AFC country.

Club	Player 1	Player 2	Player 3	Player 4	Player 5	Player 6	Asian Player
Ang Thong	(Ivory Coast) Coulibaly Amiral	(Ivory Coast) Marc Landry Babo	(Japan) Seiji Kaneko	(Laos) Khampheng	(Slovakia) Viliam Macko	(South Korea) Kim Tae-Young	(Japan) Nobuhito Takahashi
Ayutthaya	(Cameroon) Berlin Ndebe-Nlome	(Central African Republic) Franklin Anzité	(Japan) Seiya Kojima	(Nigeria) Adefolarin Durosinmi	(Spain) Dani Sanchez	(Wales) Michael Byrne	(Japan) Noguchi Pinto
Bangkok	(Brazil) Valci Júnior	(Ivory Coast) Diarra Ali	(Japan) Masahito Noto	(Ghana) Samuel Kwaku	(South Korea) Kwon Dae-hee	(South Korea) Lee Jae-Min	(Japan) Suguru Hashimoto
BBCU	(Brazil) Marcio Da Silva	(Ivory Coast) Fofana Abib	(Mali) Souleymane Coulibaly	(Nigeria) Julius Oiboh	(Sweden) Olof Watson	(South Korea) Moon Hyeon-Ho	(South Korea) Chae Wan-Ji
Chiangmai	(Argentina) Matías Recio	(Brazil) Diego Oliveira	(Paraguay) Anggello Machuca	(Paraguay) Ever Benítez	—	—	(South Korea) Jung Chul-woon
Khonkaen	(Brazil) Mario Da Silva	(China) Li Xiang	(Egypt) Amr Shaaban	(Ghana) Bani Abeiku	(Japan) Hiroyuki Mae	(Japan) Yusuke Nakatani	(Japan) Junki Yokono
Krabi	(Brazil) Erivaldo Oliveira	(Brazil) Patrick da Silva	(Burkina Faso) Michel Gnonka	(Cameroon) Yannick Mbengono	(Democratic Republic of the Congo) Jean Black	(Nigeria) Anayo Cosmas	(Japan) Ryohei Maeda
Nakhon Pathom	(Cameroon) Pierre Sylvain	(Ghana) Lesley Ablorh	(South Korea) Cho Kwang-Hoon	(Togo) Andre Houma	—	—	(South Korea) Jeong Woo-geun
Nakhon Ratchasima	(England) Lee Tuck	(Japan) Shinichiro Kuwada	(Japan) Shota Koide	(Montenegro) Ivan Bošković	(Serbia) Ivan Petrović	(Zambia) Noah Chivuta	(Japan) Satoshi Nagano
Pattaya United	(Brazil) Cristiano Lopes	(Brazil) Diego	(Brazil) Leopoldo Roberto	(Guinea) Moussa Sylla	(Japan) Jun Kochi	—	(South Korea) Yoon Si-Ho
Phitsanulok	(Japan) Nobutaka Suzuki	(South Korea) Jang Yong-Ik	(South Korea) Jung Ji-soo	(South Korea) Park Moon-Ho	—	—	(South Korea) Kim Dong-Hwi
Phuket	(Brazil) Andrezinho	(Brazil) Cristian Alex	(Brazil) Eber	(Brazil) Ney Fabiano	(Brazil) Tales dos Santos	(Trinidad and Tobago) Kendall Jagdeosingh	(Japan) Yusuke Sato
Roi Et	(Ivory Coast) Dosso Mamoudou	(Slovakia) Jozef Tirer	(South Korea) Jeong Hyung-Jun	(Trinidad and Tobago) Darryl Roberts	(Uzbekistan) Vadin Lyubinskiy	—	(South Korea) Kim Moon-Ju
Saraburi	(Ivory Coast) Bernard Doumbia	(Ivory Coast) Valery Djomon	(Jamaica) Errol Stevens	(Laos) Soukaphone	(South Korea) Dai Min-Joo	—	(South Korea) Baek Yong-Sun
Siam Navy	(Brazil) Felipe Ferreira	(Cameroon) David Bayiha	(Cameroon) Ludovick Takam	(Cameroon) Samuel Bille	(South Korea) Lee In-sik	(South Korea) Lim Hyun-woo	(Japan) Yuhei Ono
Sriracha Ban Bueng	(Timor-Leste) Anggisu Barbosa	(Guinea) Ibrahima Soumah	(Ivory Coast) Kouadio Pascal	(Japan) Yuki Miyazawa	—	—	(Japan) Daisuke Tada
Trat	(Brazil) Lazaro de Souza	(Ivory Coast) Labi Kassiaty	(Nigeria) Efe Obode	(Nigeria) Saidu Sani	(Ukraine) Andriy Boyko	—	(Japan) Seiya Sugishita
TTM Customs	(Cameroon) Camara Souleymane	(Cameroon) Jacques Nguemaleu	(France) Lassana Sidibe	(Japan) Hiroyuki Sugimoto	(Japan) Yuichi Yamauchi	(Morocco) El Mehdi Sidqy	(Japan) Teruaki Kurobe

== League table ==
Pos	Team	Pld	W	D	L	GF	GA	GD	Pts	Promotion or relegation
1	Nakhon Ratchasima (P, C)	34	19	11	4	56	27	+29	68	Promotion to 2015 Thai League 1
2	Saraburi (P)	34	16	13	5	55	38	+17	61	Promotion to 2015 Thai League 1
3	Siam Navy (P)	34	17	9	8	41	26	+15	60	Promotion to 2015 Thai League 1
4	Bangkok F.C.	34	14	15	5	53	37	+16	57	
5	Chiangmai	34	15	10	9	51	36	+15	55	
6	Ayutthaya	34	15	6	13	54	50	+4	51	
7	Trat	34	14	7	13	47	33	+14	49	
8	Ang Thong	34	11	15	8	48	35	+13	48	
9	BBCU	34	13	9	12	49	48	+1	48	
10	Krabi	34	13	8	13	41	38	+3	47	
11	Phuket	34	12	11	11	39	39	0	47	
12	TTM Customs	34	10	15	9	41	42	−1	45	
13	Nakhon Pathom	34	9	15	10	43	39	+4	42	
14	Pattaya United	34	12	5	17	42	53	−11	41	
15	Roi Et (R)	34	10	9	15	38	43	−5	39	Relegation to the 2015 Regional League Division 2
16	Phitsanulok (R)	34	9	11	14	36	57	−21	38	Relegation to the 2015 Regional League Division 2
17	Khonkaen (R)	34	6	10	18	23	45	−22	28	Relegation to the 2015 Regional League Division 2
18	Sriracha (R)	34	0	3	31	19	90	−71	3	Relegation to the 2015 Regional League Division 2

Updated to match(es) played on 1 November 2014. Source: Thai Premier League
Rules for classification: 1) points; 2) goal difference; 3) number of goals scored.
(C) Champions; (P) Promoted; (R) Relegated

== Results ==
Home \ Away	ANG	AUT	BAN	BBC	CHI	KHO	KRA	NKP	NAK	PAT	PHI	PHU	ROI	SAR	RAR	SRI	TAT	TTM
Ang Thong		2–2	1–1	1–0	0–0	5–1	1–0	2–2	1–2	4–0	3–3	2–1	1–1	2–3	0–1	1–0	0–0	1–0
Ayutthaya	1–1		3–2	1–2	1–0	2–0	2–1	1–0	3–1	1–0	2–0	3–0	3–0	0–2	2–0	3–1	0–2	2–3
Bangkok	1–1	3–2		1–1	3–1	3–1	2–2	2–1	1–1	2–0	1–1	2–2	0–0	0–0	1–1	2–0	2–1	4–1
BBCU	0–2	2–2	0–0		3–1	3–0	0–1	1–1	2–2	3–2	2–1	1–2	1–1	1–2	0–2	3–1	3–1	1–1
Chiangmai	1–1	2–2	0–2	2–1		1–2	1–0	1–1	2–0	5–1	3–0	2–1	0–0	4–2	1–0	4–0	2–1	3–1
Khonkaen	1–1	1–1	0–1	0–1	1–1		0–2	0–1	0–1	1–0	1–0	0–0	1–0	0–0	0–1	4–1	2–1	0–2
Krabi	2–1	3–2	0–1	0–1	0–2	2–0		1–1	2–2	0–2	1–0	0–0	2–0	1–2	0–1	6–2	1–0	1–1
Nakhon Pathom	3–4	1–1	2–2	3–1	0–0	1–0	2–0		0–0	4–1	1–1	1–0	2–1	0–1	1–1	5–1	1–1	0–1
Nakhon Ratchasima	2–1	2–1	1–0	2–1	2–2	2–0	3–3	0–0		1–0	6–0	2–0	2–1	1–1	3–0	4–1	2–0	4–0
Pattaya United	0–4	0–3	2–1	2–1	2–2	2–1	0–0	1–1	1–0		1–0	3–2	3–0	1–2	1–3	3–0	2–2	2–0
Phitsanulok	1–1	2–1	1–3	2–2	2–1	2–2	0–3	2–1	0–1	4–3		1–1	1–0	0–0	1–1	3–1	1–0	1–2
Phuket	1–0	2–1	3–1	1–2	0–1	2–0	1–3	3–0	0–0	1–0	1–1		2–1	4–5	1–0	2–1	1–0	0–0
Roi Et	0–0	1–2	1–3	5–1	2–0	1–1	1–2	3–1	0–1	1–0	1–0	1–2		2–1	2–1	2–1	0–0	1–2
Saraburi	0–0	3–0	2–2	3–0	1–1	2–2	1–0	1–1	2–1	1–2	0–1	2–2	1–1		2–1	3–1	2–2	1–0
Siam Navy	2–0	1–0	1–1	1–1	1–0	1–0	2–0	3–1	1–1	1–0	3–0	0–0	2–2	3–1		1–0	1–0	2–2
Sriracha	0–3	0–2	0–1	0–4	0–2	1–1	0–1	0–3	0–2	0–4	2–3	1–1	2–3	1–4	0–2		0–3	0–1
Trat	1–1	4–0	1–0	0–1	0–1	1–0	4–1	1–0	0–1	1–0	5–0	2–0	2–1	1–2	1–0	4–1		3–3
TTM Customs	2–0	6–2	2–2	2–3	3–2	0–0	0–0	1–1	1–1	1–1	1–1	0–0	0–1	0–0	1–0	0–0	1–2	

Updated to match(es) played on 1 November 2014. Source:
Legend: Blue = home team win; Yellow = draw; Red = away team win.

== Season statistics ==
=== Top scorers ===
As of 1 November 2014.

Rank	Player	Club	Goals
1	(Ivory Coast) Marc Landry Babo	Chiangmai(13 goals); Ang Thong(6 goals)	19
2	(Montenegro) Ivan Bošković	Nakhon Ratchasima	18
3	(Nigeria) Julius Oiboh	BBCU	17
4	(Brazil) Valci Júnior	Bangkok	16
4	(Paraguay) Anggello Machuca	Chiangmai	16
4	(South Korea) Jeong Woo-geun	Nakhon Pathom	16
7	(Brazil) Cristiano Lopes	Pattaya United	14
8	(Cameroon) Berlin Ndebe-Nlome	Ayutthaya	13
8	(Cameroon) Ludovick Takam	Siam Navy	13
10	(Brazil) Erivaldo Oliveira	Krabi	12
10	(Ghana) Lesley Ablorh	Nakhon Pathom	12
10	(Ivory Coast) Bernard Doumbia	Saraburi	12
10	(Thailand) Suriyakarn Chimjeen	Saraburi	12
10	(Japan) Seiya Sugishita	Trat	12

=== Hat-tricks ===
Player	For	Against	Result	Date
(Brazil) Valci Júnior	Bangkok	TTM Customs	4–1	29 March 2014
(Ivory Coast) Marc Landry Babo	Chiangmai	Saraburi	4–2	29 March 2014
(Trinidad and Tobago) Kendall Jagdeosingh	Trat	Ayutthaya	4–0	30 March 2014
(Thailand) Yod Chanthawong	Phitsanulok	Ang Thong	3–3	8 June 2014
(Japan) Seiya Sugishita^{4}	Trat	Phitsanulok	5–0	2 August 2014
(Brazil) Erivaldo Oliveira	Krabi	Sriracha	6–2	10 August 2014
(Brazil) Patrick da Silva	Krabi	Sriracha	6–2	10 August 2014
(Paraguay) Anggello Machuca	Chiangmai	TTM Customs	3–1	30 August 2014
(Thailand) Yod Chanthawong	Phitsanulok	Sriracha	3–2	11 October 2014
(Ghana) Lesley Ablorh	Nakhon Pathom	Sriracha	5–1	1 November 2014

== Awards ==
=== Monthly awards ===
Month	Coach of the Month		Player of the Month	
Month	Coach	Club	Player	Club
March	(Japan) Sugao Kambe	Nakhon Ratchasima	(Brazil) Valci Júnior	Bangkok
April	(Thailand) Vorawan Chitavanich	Ang Thong	(Slovakia) Viliam Macko	Ang Thong
May	(Japan) Sugao Kambe	Nakhon Ratchasima	(Sweden) Olof Hvidén-Watson	BBCU
June	(Thailand) Surasak Tungsurat	Siam Navy	(Cameroon) David Bayiha	Siam Navy
July	(Thailand) Totchtawan Sripan	Saraburi	(Cameroon) Berlin Ndebe-Nlome	Ayutthaya
August	(Thailand) Somchai Chuayboonchum	Chiangmai	(Brazil) Erivaldo Oliveira	Krabi
October	(Thailand) Krit Singha-preecha	Trat	(Montenegro) Ivan Bošković	Nakhon Ratchasima

=== Annual awards ===
==== Player of the Year ====
- Goalkeeper of the Year – (Thailand) Kampol Pathom-attakul
- Defender of the Year – (Thailand) Pralong Sawandee
- Midfielder of the Year – (Thailand) Panuwat Yimsa-ngar
- Striker of the Year – (Montenegro) Ivan Bošković

==== Coach of the Year ====
The Coach of the Year was awarded to (Thailand) Totchtawan Sripan.

==== Golden Boot ====
The Golden Boot was awarded to (Ivory Coast) Marc Landry Babo.

== See also ==
- 2014 Thai Premier League
- 2014 Regional League Division 2
- 2014 Thai FA Cup
- 2014 Thai League Cup
- 2014 Kor Royal Cup
- Thai Premier League All-Star Football
