= 2012 Thai Division 1 League =

Thai Division 1 League
- Season: 2012
- Champions: Ratchaburi
- Promoted: Ratchaburi; Suphanburi; Bangkok United
- Relegated: Phattalung; JW Rangsit; Raj Pracha; Chanthaburi
- Top goalscorer: (England) Lee Tuck (23 goals)
- Biggest home win: FC Phuket 8–1 Chanthaburi (24 June 2012)
- Biggest away win: Chanthaburi 1–9 Ratchaburi (30 May 2012)
- Highest scoring: Chanthaburi 1–9 Ratchaburi (30 May 2012) (10 goals)
- Highest attendance: 8,814; Suphanburi vs Saraburi, 20 October 2012
- Lowest attendance: 100; Krabi vs Air Force United 12 August 2012

2012 Thai League Division 1 (known as Yamaha League 1 for sponsorship reasons) is the 15th season of the League since its establishment in 1997. It is the feeder league for the Thai Premier League. A total of 18 teams will compete in the league this season.

== Changes from last season ==
=== Team changes ===
==== From Division 1 ====
Promoted to 2012 Thai Premier League

- BBCU
- Buriram (later renamed Wuachon United and re-located from Buriram Province to Songkhla Province)
- Chainat

Relegated to Regional League Division 2

- Chiangmai
- RBAC Mittraphap
- Samut Prakan Customs United
- Thai Honda

==== To Division 1 ====
Relegated from Thai Premier League

- Khonkaen
- Siam Navy
- Sriracha

Promoted from Regional League Division 2

- Krabi
- Nakhon Ratchasima
- Phattalung
- Ratchaburi

== Teams ==
=== Stadia and locations ===
Locations of the Thai Division 1 League 2012 teams

Team	Location	Stadium	Capacity	Ref.
Air Force United	Pathum Thani	North Bangkok University Stadium Thupatemee Stadium	? 25,000	
Bangkok	Thung Khru, Bangkok	72-years Anniversary Stadium (Bang Mod)	8,000	
Bangkok United	Din Daeng, Bangkok	Thai-Japanese Stadium	10,320	
Chanthaburi	Chanthaburi	Chanthaburi Province Stadium	?	
Phuket	Phuket	Surakul Stadium	15,000	
Khonkaen	Khonkaen	Khon Kaen Provincial Administrative Organization Stadium	8,500	
Krabi	Krabi	Krabi Province Stadium	6,000	
Nakhon Ratchasima	Nakhon Ratchasima	80th Birthday Stadium	20,141	
Phattalung	Phattalung	Phattalung Province Stadium	?	
PTT Rayong	Rayong	PTT Stadium	17,000	
Raj Pracha	Nakhon Pathom	Mahidol University Salaya Campus Stadium	1,000	
J.W. Rangsit	Pathum Thani	Chaloem Phra Kiat Stadium (Khlong 6)	5,000	
Ratchaburi	Ratchaburi	Ratchaburi Province Stadium	10,373	
Saraburi	Saraburi	Saraburi Stadium	10,000	
Siam Navy	Chonburi	Sattahip Navy Stadium	12,500	
Songkhla	Songkhla	Tinasulanon Stadium	35,000	
Sriracha	Chonburi	Suzuki Stadium (Sriracha)	10,207	
Suphanburi	Suphanburi	Suphanburi Province Stadium	7,122	

Football clubs in Bangkok Metropolitan Region

== Foreign players ==
Club	Player 1	Player 2	Player 3	Player 4	Player 5	Player 6	Asian Player
Air Force United	(Ghana) Annan Deodatus	(Nigeria) Julius Ononiwu	(Ivory Coast) Kouassi Yao Hermann	(United States) Devala Gorrick	(South Korea) Lee Sun-Hoo	(Cameroon) Ngassam Touffeu	(Australia) Scott Baginski
Bangkok	(England) Tomiwa Bolarinwa	(Ghana) Solomon Okutu	(Ghana) Samuel Kwaku	(England) Lee Tuck	(South Korea) Yoo Jae-Min		(South Korea) Kim Byung-Chae
Bangkok United	(France) Antonin Trilles	(France) Romain Gasmi	(Brazil) Gilson Diaś	(Japan) Jun Uruno	(South Korea) Kwon Hyuk-Jin		(Syria) Mohamad Al Hasan
Chanthaburi	(Uganda) James Jimmy	(Malaysia) Chun Keng Hong	(Malaysia) Suhaidi Akmal	(Malaysia) Khairul Iskandar	(Malaysia) Amir Omar Khata	(Cameroon) Ngoumou Manga	(Japan) Junichi Watanabe
Phuket	(Ivory Coast) Nene Bi	(Ivory Coast) Ibrahim Kanouté	(Bolivia) Roland Vargas	(Brazil) Marcio	(Brazil) Alonso	(South Korea) Boas Chun	(South Korea) Yeon Seung-Won
Khonkaen	(Argentina) Matías Recio	(Egypt) Amr Shaaban	(Brazil) Rafael	(Laos) Kanlaya Sysomvang	(Laos) Khampheng Sayavutthi	(Japan) Shotaro Hattori	(China) Li Xiang
Krabi	(Nigeria) Anayo Cosmas	(Nigeria) Justin Uche	(Brazil) Cristiano Lopes	(South Korea) Lee Jong-Yun	(South Korea) Kim Seung-Myung		(Laos) Soukaphone Vongchiengkham
Nakhon Ratchasima	(Ghana) Bani Abeiku	(Brazil) Rian Marques	(Brazil) Valci Júnior	(Cameroon) Etoundi Claude	(Ivory Coast) Dapley Togbe	(France) David Le Bras	(South Korea) Jang Yong-Ik
Phattalung	(Ivory Coast) Sylla Manesse	(Nigeria) Goodluck Cliff					
PTT Rayong	(Ivory Coast) Amadou Ouattara	(England) Chris Brandon	(Ivory Coast) Francis Koné	(Cameroon) Ebako Merlin	(Slovakia) Jozef Tirer	(Japan) Noguchi Pinto	(South Korea) Yagin Boas
Raj Pracha Thailand	(Ghana) Victor Mensah	(Ghana) Dawuda Wulampah	(Cameroon) Aboubakar Bako	(Cameroon) Emile Yen	(Brazil) Pedro Henrique	(England) Ben Webster	(South Korea) Jeong Woo-geun
J.W. Rangsit	(Ghana) Lesley Ablorh	(Ivory Coast) Abdoul Coulibaly	(Cameroon) Takem Atah	(Ivory Coast) Youssouf Bamba	(Brazil) Fabricio Moreira	(Brazil) Andre	(Nigeria) Onyemelukwe Okechukwu
Ratchaburi	(Cameroon) Bouba Abbo	(Cameroon) Kwayep Romeo	(Ivory Coast) Henri Jöel	(Brazil) Douglas	(Brazil) Wander Luiz		(South Korea) Jang Gil-Hyeok
Saraburi	(Cameroon) Stéphane Jocky	(Ivory Coast) Valery Djomon	(Sierra Leone) Alpha Sama	(South Korea) Dai Min-Joo	(South Korea) Joo Jin-Hak	(South Korea) Kim Min-Hyun	(South Korea) Choi Jae-Won
Siam Navy	(Ivory Coast) Tiene Moussa	(Ivory Coast) Mathieu Kouamé	(Cameroon) Sammy Bille	(Brazil) Paulo Enrique	(Brazil) Paulo Renato		(South Korea) Jung Ji-Soo
Songkhla	(Cameroon) Elvis Job	(Nigeria) Saidu Sani	(France) Jonathan Matijas	(Japan) Ryohei Maeda			(Japan) Kimiaki Kinomura
Sriracha	(Cameroon) Berlin Ndebe-Nlome	(Brazil) Diego Pishinin	(Brazil) Douglas Cobo	(Japan) Jun Kochi	(Japan) Yuta Hamada	(Argentina) Gaston Raul	(Japan) Seiya Kojima
Suphanburi	(Nigeria) Emmanuel Nwachi	(Ivory Coast) Diarra Ali	(England) Jorrin John	(Brazil) Ney Fabiano	(Japan) Hiroki Ibisawa		(Japan) Yuki Bamba

== League table ==
Pos	Team	Pld	W	D	L	GF	GA	GD	Pts	Promotion or relegation
1	Ratchaburi (C, P)	34	24	6	4	85	31	+54	78	Promotion to 2013 Thai League 1
2	Suphanburi (P)	34	23	6	5	58	17	+41	75	Promotion to 2013 Thai League 1
3	Bangkok United (P)	34	23	5	6	57	29	+28	74	Promotion to 2013 Thai League 1
4	Sriracha	34	21	4	9	70	41	+29	67	
5	PTT Rayong	34	19	5	10	61	33	+28	62	
6	Krabi	34	17	6	11	49	28	+21	57	
7	Siam Navy	34	13	11	10	54	42	+12	50	
8	Nakhon Ratchasima	34	12	11	11	42	46	−4	47	
9	Air Force United	34	12	8	14	45	45	0	44	
10	Bangkok F.C.	34	11	9	14	62	56	+6	42	
11	Khonkaen	34	12	6	16	36	50	−14	42	
12	Saraburi	34	11	8	15	49	53	−4	41	
13	Phuket	34	10	10	14	41	47	−6	40	
14	Songkhla	34	9	10	15	38	51	−13	37	
15	Phattalung (R)	34	7	13	14	37	58	−21	34	Relegation to the 2013 Regional League Division 2
16	J.W. Rangsit (R)	34	8	7	19	36	65	−29	31	Relegation to the 2013 Regional League Division 2
17	Raj Pracha (R)	34	6	7	21	33	66	−33	25	Relegation to the 2013 Regional League Division 2
18	Chanthaburi (R)	34	0	4	30	21	115	−94	4	Relegation to the 2013 Regional League Division 2

Updated to match(es) played on 27 October 2012. Source: Thai Premier League
Rules for classification: 1st points; 2nd head-to-head (only match result, not used aggregate); 3rd match win; 4th goal difference; 5th goals scored.
(C) Champions; (P) Promoted; (R) Relegated

== Results ==
Home \ Away	AFU	BAN	BKU	CHN	PHU	KHO	KRA	NAK	PHT	PTT	RPT	JWR	RAT	SAR	RAR	SON	SRI	SUP
Air Force United		0–0	2–3	3–1	3–0	1–0	0–2	3–1	1–2	1–0	4–2	4–1	1–2	1–0	1–1	0–1	2–4	0–0
Bangkok F.C.	2–1		2–2	2–1	0–1	3–0	2–1	1–2	4–2	1–2	4–1	5–0	1–3	3–3	0–2	1–1	2–1	0–1
Bangkok United	0–0	2–1		2–1	2–1	2–0	0–1	2–0	2–4	0–1	3–1	2–0	0–1	1–0	1–0	3–1	0–0	2–1
Chanthaburi	0–2	0–7	0–3		0–1	1–4	1–3	1–2	0–0	1–5	2–3	2–2	1–9	1–2	0–4	0–0	1–5	1–3
Phuket	3–3	2–1	0–3	8–1		5–2	0–1	1–1	0–0	0–1	1–1	5–0	0–1	0–1	1–0	1–0	0–1	0–0
Khonkaen	1–1	2–2	0–0	1–0	1–1		1–3	0–1	2–0	1–0	2–0	1–0	1–0	2–1	1–1	0–0	0–3	2–1
Krabi	3–1	2–1	0–2	6–0	0–0	2–0		1–0	4–0	1–1	4–1	1–0	1–0	2–0	1–2	0–0	2–2	0–1
Nakhon Ratchasima	2–1	2–2	0–2	5–0	0–1	2–1	0–0		3–2	2–5	2–2	0–0	0–3	1–1	2–1	2–2	2–0	1–0
Phattalung	0–1	2–3	1–4	2–2	1–1	3–2	1–0	0–3		1–4	1–1	2–2	3–3	1–2	1–1	1–0	2–1	0–0
PTT Rayong	0–0	2–0	0–1	5–0	6–0	2–1	1–0	0–1	2–0		1–1	2–0	1–0	3–0	2–1	2–0	1–2	1–1
Raj Pracha Thailand	0–1	0–1	0–1	4–0	1–4	0–2	0–4	0–0	1–2	2–1		1–0	1–3	1–1	0–3	1–0	3–0	0–4
J.W. Rangsit	2–0	3–2	0–3	4–0	0–0	0–2	0–3	1–1	1–1	3–1	1–0		0–2	2–1	1–4	3–1	1–2	1–3
Ratchaburi	3–1	2–1	1–2	2–1	3–0	4–0	4–0	1–1	1–1	5–3	6–2	3–1		4–0	4–2	3–0	1–1	0–0
Saraburi	1–1	3–3	1–2	5–2	5–1	1–2	3–1	1–0	1–0	1–2	2–1	2–2	1–1		2–1	3–3	3–0	0–1
Siam Navy	2–0	1–1	2–2	2–0	2–0	4–0	0–0	2–2	1–0	2–2	0–0	2–1	0–3	2–1		2–2	1–2	2–4
Songkhla	2–3	3–3	0–3	2–0	0–1	2–1	2–0	2–0	0–0	1–0	2–1	3–1	1–2	2–1	2–3		2–3	0–1
Sriracha	2–1	4–1	4–0	3–0	4–2	2–0	1–0	3–1	5–1	0–2	3–1	3–1	2–3	2–0	1–1	4–0		0–2
Suphanburi	2–1	3–0	3–0	4–0	2–0	2–1	1–0	4–0	0–0	3–0	1–0	1–2	1–2	1–0	2–0	3–1	2–0	

Updated to match(es) played on 27 October 2012. Source: Thai Premier League
Legend: Blue = home team win; Yellow = draw; Red = away team win.

== Season statistics ==
=== Top scorers ===
Rank	Player	Club	Goals
1	(England) Lee Tuck	Bangkok	23
2	(Ivory Coast) Kouassi Yao Hermann	Air Force United	20
3	(Brazil) Douglas	Ratchaburi	19
4	(Thailand) Anuwat Nakkaseam	Sriracha	18
4	(France) Romain Gasmi	Bangkok United	18
6	(Thailand) Pipat Thonkanya	Suphanburi	16
6	(Thailand) Promphong Kransumrong	Nakhon Ratchasima	16
6	(Thailand) Suphakorn Naknoi	Saraburi	16
9	(Argentina) Raúl Goález Gastón	Sriracha	15
10	(Thailand) Sompong Soleb	Bangkok United	14

== Attendances ==
Pos	Team	Total	High	Low	Average	Change
1	Nakhon Ratchasima	121,225	8,484	2,210	6,694	0.0%
2	Suphanburi	102,222	8,814	3,594	5,495	+140.6%
3	Ratchaburi	58,639	8,745	1,600	3,182	0.0%
4	Krabi	54,606	4,983	100	3,212	0.0%
5	Phuket	43,783	3,570	1,100	2,372	−51.6%
6	PTT Rayong	39,545	3,626	846	2,276	−1.6%
7	Khonkaen	33,175	2,650	498	1,844	−40.6%
8	Phattalung	31,992	5,000	500	1,852	0.0%
9	Songkhla	30,931	5,719	418	1,786	−84.8%
10	Bangkok F.C.	27,011	2,545	300	1,411	+53.9%
11	Saraburi	25,280	2,480	1,034	1,418	−33.0%
12	Bangkok United	24,729	2,459	555	1,310	+110.6%
13	Siam Navy	21,574	2,127	741	1,144	−50.6%
14	Sriracha	21,420	2,218	686	1,180	−41.3%
15	Air Force United	15,798	1,636	375	872	−35.9%
16	Chanthaburi	14,042	7,200	332	801	−54.9%
17	J.W. Rangsit	10,876	1,327	132	632	−7.7%
18	Raj Pracha Thailand	10,400	1,000	200	582	−33.3%
	League total	687,248	8,745	100	2,115	−27.0%

Updated to games played on 27 Oct 2012
Source: Thai Division 1 League
Notes:
^{†} Team played previous season in Division 2 League.

== See also ==
- 2012 Thai Premier League
- 2012 Regional League Division 2
- 2012 Thai FA Cup
- 2012 Kor Royal Cup
