= Surapong Kongthep =

Thai footballer and coach (born 1979)

Personal information
- Full name: Surapong Kongthep
- Date of birth: 18 January 1979 (age 47)
- Place of birth: Bangkok, Thailand
- Height: 1.70 m (5 ft 7 in)
- Position: Midfielder

Team information
- Current team: Rasisalai United (head coach)

Senior career*
Years	Team	Apps	(Gls)
2007–2012	Chula United		

Managerial career
- 2013–2016: Muangthong United (youth)
- 2015: Pattaya United (assistant)
- 2015: Pattaya United (caretaker)
- 2016: BEC Tero Sasana (assistant)
- 2016: BEC Tero Sasana (caretaker)
- 2017–2018: Pattaya United
- 2019: Samut Prakan City
- 2019: Chiangmai
- 2020–2021: Sukhothai
- 2021: Chiangmai United
- 2023: Port
- 2024: Ratchaburi
- 2025–2026: Nakhon Ratchasima
- 2026–: Rasisalai United
- * Club domestic league appearances and goals

Surapong Kongthep (Thai: สุรพงษ์ คงเทพ; born 18 January 1979), is a Thai professional football manager and former playerwho is currently the head coach of Thai League 1 club Rasisalai United.

== Managerial career ==
=== Nakhon Ratchasima ===
On 15 November 2025, Nakhon Ratchasima confirmed the appointment of Surapong Kongthep as head coach.

=== Rasisalai United ===
On 18 October 2026, Kongthep was appointed as head coach of Rasisalai United, replacing Sirisak Yodyardthai.

== Managerial statistics ==
As of match played 22 November 2026

Managerial record by team and tenure
Team	From	To	Record				
Team	From	To	P	W	D	L	Win %
Police Tero	12 May 2016	30 November 2016	16	7	4	5	43.8
Pattaya	11 February 2017	7 October 2018	75	29	16	30	38.7
Samut Prakan City	7 October 2018	29 May 2019	15	7	5	3	46.7
Chiangmai	15 June 2019	12 November 2019	17	4	4	9	23.5
Sukhothai	19 November 2019	23 April 2021	32	9	4	19	28.1
Chiangmai United	15 June 2021	27 October 2021	10	2	3	5	20.0
Port	6 February 2023	7 November 2023	27	16	2	9	59.3
Ratchaburi	28 June 2024	16 September 2024	6	1	2	3	16.7
Nakhon Ratchasima	1 December 2025	7 June 2026	20	6	2	12	30.0
Rasisalai United	18 October 2026	Present	4	0	0	4	0.0
Total			222	81	42	99	36.5

== Honours ==
=== Manager ===
Individual

- Thai League 1 Coach of the Month: June 2016, July 2018, October 2019, September 2023
