= Nakul Pinthong =

Thai footballer (born 1987)

Personal information
- Full name: Nakul Pinthong
- Date of birth: 26 June 1987 (age 39)
- Place of birth: Samut Prakan, Thailand
- Height: 1.76 m (5 ft 9 1/2 in)
- Position: Attacking midfielder

Youth career
- 2006: Chula United

Senior career*
Years	Team	Apps	(Gls)
2007–2017	BBCU	63	(4)
2017	Kopoon Warrior	12	(0)
2018–	Nakhon Pathom United		
- * Club domestic league appearances and goals as of 00:40, 3 October 2017 (UTC)

Nakul Pinthong (Thai: ณกุลฑ์ ปิ่นทอง) or Kittisak Pinthong (Thai: กิติศักดิ์ ปิ่นทอง), (born June 26, 1987), is a Thai former professional footballer who played as an attacking midfielder.
