= Pummared Kladkleeb =

Thai footballer (born 1987)

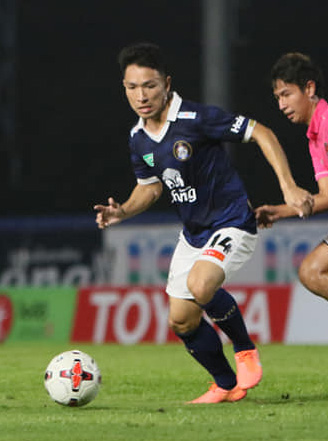
- Pummared Kladkleeb playing for Nakhon Pathom United.

Personal information
- Full name: Pummared Kladkleeb
- Date of birth: September 18, 1987 (age 39)
- Place of birth: Thailand
- Position: Midfielder

Team information
- Current team: Bankhai United
- Number: 14

Senior career*
Years	Team	Apps	(Gls)
2016	BBCU	14	(0)
2017–2018	Port	7	(0)
2019	Kasetsart	32	(2)
2020–2021	Nakhon Pathom United	16	(0)
2021–2022	Thawi Watthana Samut Sakhon United	8	(0)
2022–2023	Dragon Pathumwan Kanchanaburi	12	(0)
2023–2024	Navy	18	(3)
2024–	Bankhai United	9	(0)
- * Club domestic league appearances and goals as of 22 November 2024

Pummared Kladkleeb (Thai: ภุมเรศ กลัดกลีบ, born September 18, 1987) is a Thai professional footballer who currently plays for Bankhai United in the Thai League 3.
