= Marc Landry Babo =

Ivorian footballer (born 1991)

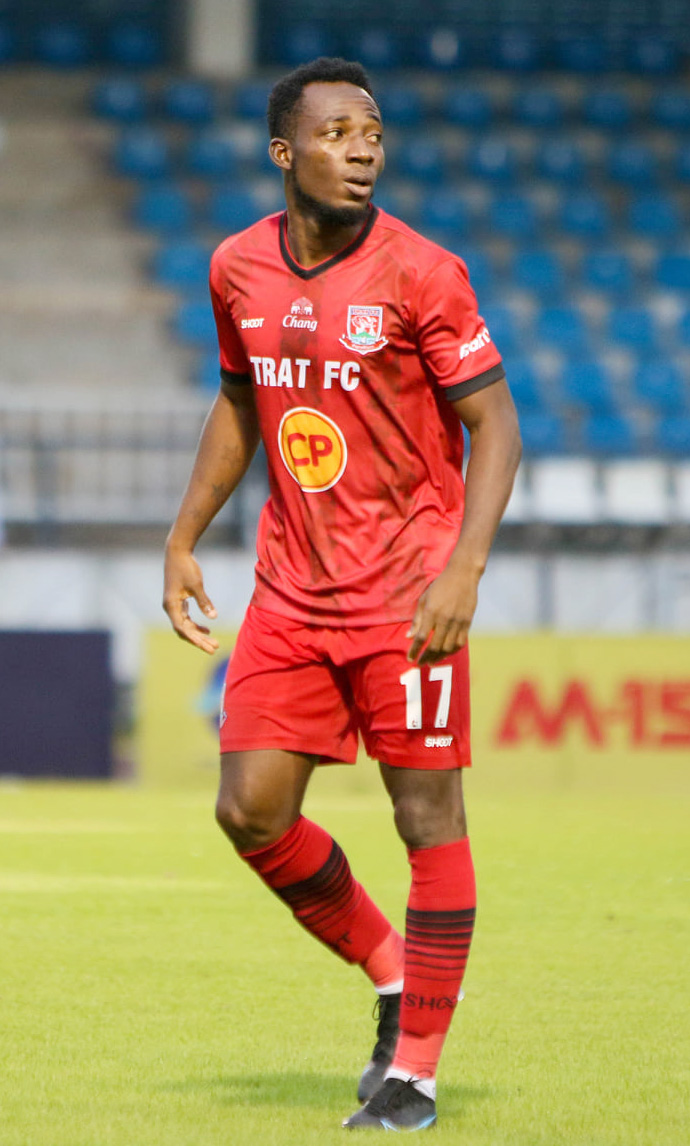
- Babo playing for Trat against Navy in 2021

Personal information
- Full name: Marc Landry Babo
- Date of birth: 13 March 1991 (age 35)
- Place of birth: Ivory Coast
- Positions: Winger; forward

Senior career*
Years	Team	Apps	(Gls)
2009–2010	Yadanarbon		
2013	Samut Songkhram	12	(2)
2014	Chiangmai		(13)
2014	Ang Thong		(6)
2015	Samut Songkhram		(18)
2016–2017	Ang Thong		(13)
2018	Khon Kaen		(16)
2019	Sisaket	34	(12)
2020	Ayutthaya United	4	(3)
2020	Police Tero	5	(2)
2020–2021	→ Sisaket (loan)	1	(1)
2021–2022	→ Trat (loan)	31	(11)
2022–2024	Police Tero	26	(9)
- * Club domestic league appearances and goals as of 29 January 2024

Marc Landry Babo (born 13 March 1991) is an Ivorian professional footballer who plays as a winger or a forward. He has spent most of his career in Thailand, and was the top scorer of the 2014 Thai Division 1 League.

== Career ==
Babo began his career in Myanmar with Yadanarbon. He moved to Thailand, where his clubs have included Samut Songkhram, Chiangmai, Ang Thong, Khon Kaen, Sisaket, Ayutthaya United and Police Tero.

In 2014 he was the top scorer in the Thai Division 1 League with 19 goals for Ang Thong. In 2018 he scored 16 goals for Khon Kaen, the third-highest total in Thai League 2 that year.

In September 2020, Thai League 1 club Police Tero signed him, after a spell with Ayutthaya United earlier that year, as a replacement for Brazilian forward Matheus Alves. Police Tero loaned him to Sisaket, and then, in June 2021, to Thai League 2 side Trat, before he returned to Police Tero for the 2022–23 season.
