= 2014 Thai League Cup =

Tournament details
- Country: Thailand
- Dates: 1 February – 12 October 2014

Final positions
- Champions: BEC Tero Sasana (1st title)
- Runners-up: Buriram United

Awards
- Best player: Chanathip Songkrasin

The Thai League Cup is a knock-out football tournament played in Thai sport. Some games are played as a single match, others are played as two-legged contests. The 2014 Thai League Cup kicked off on 1 February 2014 with the Bangkok & field regional qualifiers. The Thai League Cup has been readmitted back into Thai football after a 10-year absence. The Thai League Cup is sponsored by Toyota thus naming it Toyota League Cup. The prize money for this prestigious award is said to be around 5 million baht and the runners-up will be netting 1 million baht.

The prize money is not the only benefit of this cup, the team winning the fair play spot will get a Hilux Vigo. The MVP of the competition will get a Toyota Camry Hybrid Car. The winner of the cup will earn the right to participate on a cup competition in Japan.

This is the first edition of the competition and the qualifying round will be played in regions featuring clubs from the Regional League Division 2.

== Calendar ==
Round	Date	Matches	Clubs	New entries this round
First Qualifying Round	1 February 2014	27	54 → 8 to First Round and 19 to Qualifying Second Round	54 Regional League Division 2
Second Qualifying Round	8, 9 February 2014	18	17 + 19 → 18	17 Regional League Division 2
First Round	1,2 March 2014	32	8 + 18 + 18 + 20 → 32	18 2014 Thai Division 1 League and 20 2014 Thai Premier League
Second Round	30 April 2014	16	32 → 16	
Third Round	11 June 2014	8	16 → 8	
Quarter-finals	18 June 2014	4	8 → 4	
Quarter-finals	2 July 2014	4	8 → 4	
Semi-finals	16 July 2014	4	4 → 2	
Semi-finals	30 July 2014	4	4 → 2	
Final	12 October 2014	1	2 → Champions	
Total				118 clubs

== 1st round ==
1 March 2014	Chamchuri United	0 – 6	Osotspa Saraburi	Bangkok
14:30 (UTC+6)				Stadium: Chulalongkorn University Sports Stadium

1 March 2014	Loei City	1 – 2 (a.e.t.)	Police United	Loei
14:30 (UTC+6)				Stadium: River Side Stadium Loei

1 March 2014	Chachoengsao	0 – 6	Bangkok Glass	Chachoengsao
14:30 (UTC+6)				Stadium: Pimpayachan Stadium

1 March 2014	BCC Tero	1 – 3	Chiangrai United	Bangkok
15:15 (UTC+6)				Stadium: Thephasadin Stadium

1 March 2014	Nakhon Si Thammarat	1 – 5	PTT Rayong	Nakhon Si Thammarat
16:30 (UTC+6)				Stadium: Ronpibul Stadium

1 March 2014	Uttaradit	2 – 2 (a.e.t.)	Singhtarua	Uttaradit
17:00 (UTC+6)				Stadium: Uttaradit Stadium

1 March 2014	Udon Thani	1 – 2	Ratchaburi	Udon Thani
17:00 (UTC+6)				Stadium: Institute Of Physical Education Udon Thani Stadium

1 March 2014	RBAC	0 – 1	Air Force Central	Bangkok
17:00 (UTC+6)				Stadium: Institute Of Physical Education Udon Thani Stadium

1 March 2014	Rayong	0 – 1	Samut Songkhram	Rayong
17:00 (UTC+6)				Stadium: Rayong Stadium

1 March 2014	Muangkan	2 – 3	Nakhon Ratchasima	Kanchanaburi
17:00 (UTC+6)

1 March 2014	Khonkaen	1 – 1 (a.e.t.)	Pattaya United	Khon Kaen
17:00 (UTC+6)				Stadium: Khon Kaen Stadium

1 March 2014	Chiangrai	4 – 0	Chiangmai	Chiang Rai
17:00 (UTC+6)				Stadium: Chiangrai Stadium

1 March 2014	Phuket	2 – 1	Sisaket	Phuket
17:00 (UTC+6)				Stadium: Surakul Stadium

2 March 2014	Thonburi City	0 – 4	Bangkok	Bangkok
14:30 (UTC+6)

2 March 2014	Singburi	2 – 3	Ang Thong	Singburi
14:30 (UTC+6)

=== Final ===
12 October 2014	Buriram United F.C.	0 – 2	BEC Tero Sasana F.C.	Bangkok
			Daiki Iwamasa 76'; Georgie Welcome 90+1'	Stadium: Supachalasai Stadium
