= Piyawit Janput =

Thai footballer (born 1992)

Personal information
- Full name: Piyawit Janput
- Date of birth: 4 March 1992 (age 34)
- Place of birth: Khon Kaen, Thailand
- Height: 1.76 m (5 ft 9 in)
- Position: Left-back

Youth career
- Chonburi

Senior career*
Years	Team	Apps	(Gls)
2011–2015	Chonburi		
2011–2013	→ Sriracha (loan)		
2014	→ Singhtarua (loan)	13	(0)
2015	→ Chainat Hornbill (loan)	4	(0)
2016	BBCU	17	(0)
2017	Lampang		
2018	Trat		
2019	Ayutthaya United		
2019–2021	Khon Kaen United		
- * Club domestic league appearances and goals

Piyawit Janput (Thai: ปิยะวิทย์ จันพุทธ; born 4 March 1992) is a Thai professional footballer who plays as a left-back. He played from 2014 to 2016 in the Thai Premier League for BBCU, Chainat Hornbill and Singhtarua.
