= Chad Chaiyabutr =

American professional soccer player

Personal information
- Full name: Chad Aaron Chaiyabutr
- Date of birth: December 13, 1991 (age 34)
- Place of birth: United States
- Height: 1.81 m (5 ft 11 1/2 in)
- Position: Forward

Youth career
- 2010–2012: Portland Timbers

Senior career*
Years	Team	Apps	(Gls)
2012	Chonburi	0	(0)
2013	TOT	0	(0)
2014	Chaiyaphum	16	(5)
2014	Kalasin	5	(0)
2014	→ Trang (loan)	10	(2)
2015–2017	BBCU	9	(1)
2018–2019	Army United	6	(0)
Total		46	(8)
- * Club domestic league appearances and goals

Chad Aaron Chaiyabutr (Thai: แชด แอฬอน ชัยบุตร; born December 13, 1991) is an American former professional soccer player who played as a forward.

== Personal life ==
Chad is the son of Cherdsak Chaiyabutr, who is a former Thailand national team player.
