= Milan Bubalo =

Serbian footballer

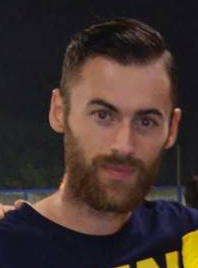
- Milan Bubalo

Personal information
- Full name: Milan Bubalo
- Date of birth: 8 May 1990 (age 36)
- Place of birth: Inđija, SFR Yugoslavia
- Height: 1.86 m (6 ft 1 in)
- Positions: Right winger; forward

Senior career*
Years	Team	Apps	(Gls)
2007–2011	Inđija	69	(11)
2011–2012	Hajduk Kula	26	(10)
2012	Koper	11	(1)
2013	Hajduk Kula	2	(0)
2013	Gyeongnam	34	(6)
2014	Muangthong United	28	(7)
2015	Pattaya United	30	(20)
2016	BEC Tero Sasana	27	(8)
2017	Vojvodina	0	(0)
2018	Udon Thani	13	(5)
2018	Trat	9	(2)
2019	Lamphun Warrior	11	(2)
2019	Inđija	0	(0)
2019–2020	Novi Pazar	6	(0)
2020	Budućnost Dobanovci	6	(1)
2020–2021	Ayutthaya United	23	(8)
2021	Khonkaen	10	(0)
2021–2022	Mahasarakham	3	(1)

International career
2009	Serbia U19	5	(0)
- * Club domestic league appearances and goals as of 1 Jan 2022 (UTC)

Milan Bubalo (Serbian Cyrillic: Милан Бубало, born 8 May 1990) is a Serbian footballer who plays as a forward.

== Career ==
Born in Inđija (SR Serbia, SFR Yugoslavia) he played with Inđija and Hajduk Kula in the Serbian SuperLiga before moving to Slovenian side Koper in summer 2012.

After playing for four years in Asia for Gyeongnam, Muangthong United, Pattaya United and BEC Tero Sasana, Bubalo returned to Serbian football, signing a two-year deal with Vojvodina.

== Career statistics ==
As of match played 26 February 2022

Appearances and goals by club, season and competition
Club	Season	League			National cup		League cup		Continental		Other		Total	
Club	Season	Division	Apps	Goals	Apps	Goals	Apps	Goals	Apps	Goals	Apps	Goals	Apps	Goals
Inđija	2008–09	Serbian First League	15	4	0	0	—		—		—		15	4
Inđija	2009–10	Serbian First League	27	3	0	0	—		—		—		27	3
Inđija	2010–11	Serbian SuperLiga	27	4	0	0	—		—		—		27	4
Inđija	Total		69	11	0	0	—		—		—		69	11
Hajduk Kula	2011–12	Serbian SuperLiga	26	10	1	0	—		—		—		27	10
Koper	2012–13	Slovenian PrvaLiga	11	1	0	0	—		—		—		11	1
Hajduk Kula	2012–13	Serbian SuperLiga	2	0	—		—		—		—		2	0
Gyeongnam FC	2013	K League Classic	33	7	2	0			—		—		35	7
Muangthong United	2014	Thai Premier League	28	7					2	0	—		30	7
Pattaya United	2015	Thai Division 1 League	30	20					—		—		30	20
BEC Tero Sasana	2016	Thai League T1	27	8					—		—		27	8
Vojvodina	2017–18	Serbian SuperLiga	0	0	0	0	—		1	0	—		1	0
Udon Thani	2018	Thai League 2	13	5	—		—		—		—		13	5
Trat	2018	Thai League 2	9	2	3	2	0	0	—		—		12	4
Lamphun Warrior	2019	Thai League 3	11	2	0	0	—		—		—		11	2
Novi Pazar	2019–20	Serbian First League	6	0	0	0	—		—		—		6	0
Budućnost Dobanovci	2019–20	Serbian First League	6	1	—		—		—		—		6	1
Ayutthaya United	2020–21	Thai League 2	23	8	—		—		—		—		23	8
Khonkaen	2021–22	Thai League 2	10	0	0	0	—		—		—		10	0
Mahasarakham	2021–22	Thai League 3	3	1	—		—		—		—		3	1
Career total			307	83	24	0	0	0	3	0	0	0	334	83
