= Tufy Pina =

Brazilian footballer

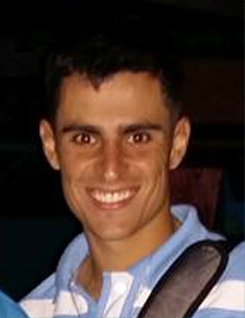

Personal information
- Full name: Antonio Pereira Pina Neto
- Date of birth: 26 March 1989 (age 37)
- Place of birth: Aracati de Minas, Brazil
- Height: 1.81 m (5 ft 11 in)
- Position: Midfielder

Senior career*
Years	Team	Apps	(Gls)
2010	Brasilis		
2011	Osotspa		
2012	Dong Tam Long An		(1)
2012	Friburguense	3	(0)
2013	Bangkok		
2013	Siam Navy		
2014–2015	Friburguense	24	(1)
2016	Pattaya United	26	(1)
2017–2018	Nakhon Ratchasima	58	(5)
2019	Police Tero	14	(0)
2020	Hong Linh Ha Tinh	2	(0)
2020–2022	Ipatinga	0	(0)
2022–2023	Udon United	22	(2)
- * Club domestic league appearances and goals as of 18 March 2023

Antonio Pereira "Tufy" Pina Neto (born March 26, 1989), better known as Tufy Pina, is a Brazilian footballer who plays as a midfielder.
