= Totchtawan Sripan =

Thai footballer and manager

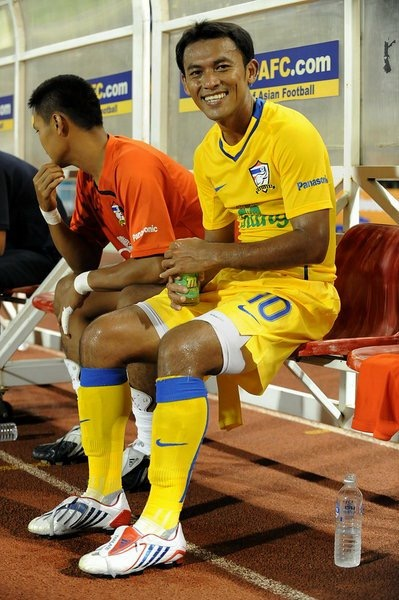

Personal information
- Full name: Totchtawan Sripan
- Birth name: Tawan Sripan
- Date of birth: 13 December 1971 (age 54)
- Place of birth: Saraburi, Thailand
- Height: 1.69 m (5 ft 6 1/2 in)
- Position: Attacking midfielder

Youth career
- 1983–1985: Kaeng Khoi School
- 1986–1988: Saraburi Technical College
- 1989–1992: Rajamangala College Nonthaburi

Senior career*
Years	Team	Apps	(Gls)
1993–1994	Raj-Vithi	15	(1)
1995–1997	Bangkok Bank	51	(11)
1998–2003	Sembawang Rangers	180	(29)
2004–2006	Hoàng Anh Gia Lai	49	(13)
2007–2009	BEC Tero Sasana	60	(6)
Total		355	(60)

International career
1993–2009	Thailand	110	(19)

Managerial career
- 2009: BEC Tero Sasana (player-manager)
- 2010: BEC Tero Sasana
- 2010–2015: Saraburi
- 2015: Police United
- 2016–2018: Muangthong United
- 2018: Police Tero
- 2018–2019: Suphanburi
- 2020–2022: Bangkok United
- 2022–2023: Bangkok United (interim)
- 2023–2026: Bangkok United
Medal record
Thailand national football team
Sea Games
Gold medal – first place	Sea Games 1993	Football
Gold medal – first place	Sea Games 1995	Football
Gold medal – first place	Sea Games 1997	Football
Gold medal – first place	Sea Games 1999	Football
- * Club domestic league appearances and goals

Totchtawan Sripan (Thai: ธชตวัน ศรีปาน; born as Tawan Sripan on 13 December 1971) is a Thai professional football manager and former attacking midfielder. He prominently represented the Thailand during an international career spanning from 1992 to 2009.

== Playing career ==
Tawan's talent was first discovered by national team coach Chatchai Paholpat, who gave him his senior international debut against Bangladesh in the first round of 1994 World Cup qualification. He went on to make 109 more appearances for Thailand, scoring 19 goals, playing at two AFC Asian Cups – the latter as captain and on home soil – and gathering numerous accolades.

In 1995, Chatchai led Tawan to his former club Bangkok Bank. Tawan stayed there for two years before spending five more at the Sembawang Rangers, where he partnered fellow Thais Thawatchai Damrong-Ongtrakul, Bamrung Boonprom, Niweat Siriwong and Teerasak Po-on. All of them gradually left Singapore seeing the Stallions' lack of success, with Tawan going to a Hoàng Anh Gia Lai side under Arjhan Srong-ngamsub's tutelage and spearheaded by Kiatisuk Senamuang and Dusit Chalermsan.

Tawan returned to Thailand once his contract expired in 2007 and retired two years later, having guided BEC Tero Sasana to two consecutive third-place finishes in the Thai Premier League (2007 and 2008).

As a player, Tawan was left-footed and known for his playmaking and set-piece ability. One of his most memorable goals was a free kick against the Netherlands in 2007. He changed his name to Totchtawan in 2010.

== Managerial career ==
=== BEC Tero Sasana ===
In May 2009, after parting ways with Christophe Larrouilh mid-season, BEC Tero Sasana decided to promote Tawan to player-coach status. He managed BEC Tero to fourth in the league and reached the final of the Thai FA Cup, losing to Port on penalties.

=== Saraburi ===
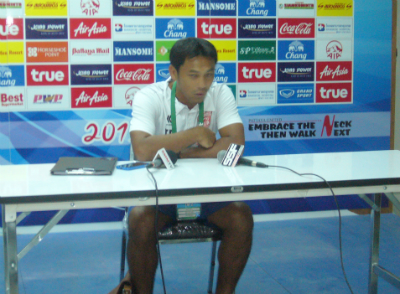
Totchtawan with Saraburi in 2014

In December 2010, Tawan, now Totchtawan, joined his hometown club Saraburi when the club was still in the Regional League Division 2, the third level division. He spent his first year by promoting his club from the Division 2 to Division 1. His debut was the game in Division 1 Promotion stage against Rangsit University which Saraburi won 2–0. Saraburi promoted to Division 1 by finishing third place in group A of the qualification. Saraburi stayed in Thai second division for four years before the historic promotion. Saraburi promoted to Thai Premier League after becoming runners-up in the end of 2014 season.

Totchtawan continued his head coach role in 2015 Thai Premier League. However, Saruburi could collect only one point after six games of the season. Totchtawan decided to resign from his position on 8 April 2015.

=== Police United ===
On 11 May 2015, around a month after previous head coach Attaphol Buspakom died of sepsis, Police United of Division 1 announced the appointment of Totchtawan. He managed the club for the rest of the season. Police United won 2015 Thai Division 1 League and promoted to Thai Premier League. Totchtawan later left Police United due to the club's financial crisis.

=== Muangthong United ===
On 21 January 2016, Muangthong United appointed Totchtawan Sripan as the club head coach. He is the first Thai head coach of the club after six years. Totchtawan made the official managerial debut on 2 February 2016 in AFC Champions League Preliminary Round 2 against Johor Darul Ta'zim from Malaysia. Muangthong won the match by the penalty shoot-out after the 0–0 draw at the end of extra-time. Muangthong United was knocked out of the AFC competition in the next round after lost 0–3 to Shanghai SIPG from China. Totchtawan Sripan eventually won a double, becoming champions of the Thai League and League Cup in his first season at Muangthong.

On 22 January 2017, Totchatawan guided Muangthong United to lift 2017 Thailand Champions Cup trophy with a 5–0 win over Sukhothai. His Muangthong United later lost 1–3 to Japanese club Sanfrecce Hiroshima in 2017 Toyota Premier Cup.

In 2017 AFC Champions League group stage, Totchtawan created the impressive run with Muangthong United by a point in the opening game against Brisbane Roar before the historic first win in the competition over Japanese J1 League champion Kashima Antlers at Supachalasai Stadium in the second match. His crews obtained another point from Ulsan Hyundai's home before the win in returning game at SCG Stadium. After six games, Muangthong is on the second of the group with 11 points pass through to knockout stage. In the end of seasons 2017, Totchtawan get Thai League 1 Coach of the Year award for the best performance in 2017 AFC Champions League.

On 11 March 2018, after a shock 1–6 away loss to PT Prachuap, Totchtawan resigned.

=== Bangkok United ===
On 15 June 2024, he led Bangkok United to win the first Thai FA Cup title in their history, after a 4–1 win on penalties over DP Kanchanaburi in the final.

== Career statistics ==
=== International ===
List of international goals scored by Totchtawan Sripan
No.	Date	Venue	Opponent	Score	Result	Competition
1	December 10, 1995	Chiang Mai, Thailand	Vietnam	3-1	Win	1995 Southeast Asian Games
2	December 16, 1995	Chiang Mai, Thailand	Vietnam	4-0	Win	1995 Southeast Asian Games
3	December 16, 1995	Chiang Mai, Thailand	Vietnam	4-0	Win	1995 Southeast Asian Games
4	October 7, 1997	Jakarta, Indonesia	Brunei	7-0	Win	1997 Southeast Asian Games
5	October 7, 1997	Jakarta, Indonesia	Brunei	7-0	Win	1997 Southeast Asian Games
6	December 12, 1997	Jakarta, Indonesia	Cambodia	4-0	Win	1997 Southeast Asian Games
7	December 2, 1998	Bangkok, Thailand	Hong Kong	5-0	Win	1998 Asian Games
8	August 1, 1999	Bandar Seri Begawan, Brunei	Laos	1-0	Win	1999 Southeast Asian Games
9	August 8, 1999	Bandar Seri Begawan, Brunei	Myanmar	7-0	Win	1999 Southeast Asian Games
10	August 12, 1999	Bandar Seri Begawan, Brunei	Singapore	2-0	Win	1999 Southeast Asian Games
11	November 16, 2000	Bangkok, Thailand	Malaysia	2-0	Win	2000 Tiger Cup
12	February 10, 2001	Bangkok, Thailand	Sweden	1-4	Lost	2001 King's Cup
13	February 12, 2001	Bangkok, Thailand	Qatar	1-3	Lost	2001 King's Cup
14	February 14, 2001	Bangkok, Thailand	China	1-5	Lost	2001 King's Cup
15	May 30, 2001	Bangkok, Thailand	Lebanon	2-2	Drew	2002 FIFA World Cup Qualification
16	June 6, 2007	Bangkok, Thailand	Netherlands	1-3	Lost	Friendly International
17	July 2, 2007	Bangkok, Thailand	Qatar	2-0	Won	Friendly International
18	June 22, 2008	Muscat, Oman	Oman	1-2	Lost	2010 FIFA World Cup Qualification
Correct as of 13 January 2017

== Managerial statistics ==
As of match played 25 October 2026

Managerial record by team and tenure
Team	From	To	Record								Ref
Team	From	To	G	W	D	L	GF	GA	GD	Win %	Ref
BEC Tero Sasana	25 June 2009	15 July 2010	35	16	8	11	65	48	+17	45.71	
Saraburi	1 December 2010	8 April 2015	158	60	50	48	222	191	+31	37.97	
Police United	11 May 2015	31 December 2015	34	20	7	7	78	28	+50	58.82	
Muangthong United	21 January 2016	12 March 2018	107	75	12	20	233	107	+126	70.09	
Police Tero	29 June 2018	14 September 2018	12	3	2	7	17	27	−10	25.00	
Suphanburi	12 November 2018	2 June 2019	15	3	5	7	14	22	−8	20.00	
Bangkok United	5 November 2020	11 March 2022	50	27	12	11	97	46	+51	54.00	
Bangkok United	28 December 2022	26 October 2026	174	99	42	33	326	180	+146	56.90	
Total			585	303	138	144	1,052	649	+403	51.79	—

== Honours ==
=== Player ===
Thailand

- Sea Games: 1993, 1995, 1997, 1999
- AFF Championship: 1996, 2000, 2002
- King's Cup: 1994, 2000, 2006
- Indonesian Independence Cup: 1994
- Asian Games fourth place: 1998, 2002

Hoang Anh Gia Lai

- V-League 1: 2004
- Vietnamese Super Cup: 2004

=== Manager ===
Saraburi

- Regional League Eastern Division: 2010
- Thai Division 1 League runner-up: 2014

Police United

- Thai Division 1 League: 2015

Muangthong United

- Thai League 1: 2016
- Thai League Cup: 2016, 2017
- Thailand Champions Cup: 2017
- Mekong Club Championship: 2017

Bangkok United

- Thai FA Cup: 2023–24
- Thailand Champions Cup: 2023

Individual

- Thai League 1 Coach of the Year: 2017, 2023–24
- Thai League 1 Coach of the Month: May 2016, November 2021, August 2023, October 2024, March 2025, April 2025, January 2026

== See also ==
- List of men's footballers with 100 or more international caps
