= Worachai Surinsirirat =

Thai footballer and coach (born 1973)

Personal information
- Full name: Worachai Surinsirirat
- Date of birth: March 26, 1973 (age 53)
- Place of birth: Surin, Thailand
- Height: 1.77 m (5 ft 9 1/2 in)
- Position: Defensive midfielder

Senior career*
Years	Team	Apps	(Gls)
1994–2000	Raj-Vithi	98	(10)
2000–2008	BEC Tero Sasana	167	(14)
2009	Chula United	22	(0)
Total		287	(24)

International career
	Thailand	24	(2)

Managerial career
- 2013–2015: BBCU
- 2017: BBCU (interim)
- 2018–2019: Thai Honda
- 2020: Sisaket
- 2021: Uthai Thani
- * Club domestic league appearances and goals

Worachai Surinsirirat (Thai: วรชัย สุรินทร์ศิริรัฐ; born March 26, 1973) is a Thai retired footballer and football coach.

Worachai has also played for the lower level club side Raj-Vithi.

== Honours ==
(All honours achieved with BEC Tero Sasana)

- Thailand premier League: 2000, 2001/02
- Thailand FA Cup: 2000
- Kor Royal Cup: 2001/02, Runner Up 2002/03, 2004/05
- Runner-up AFC Champions League: 2002/03
- Bhutan Kings Cup: 2002, 2004
- Brunei Cup: Runner Up 2001/02
