= Aron da Silva =

Brazilian footballer (born 1983)

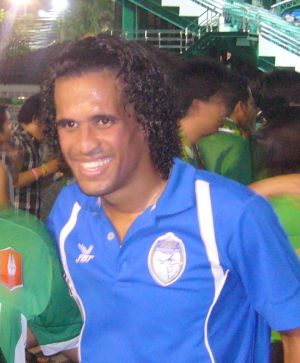

Personal information
- Full name: Aron Muniz Teixeira da Silva
- Date of birth: 2 December 1983 (age 42)
- Place of birth: Rio de Janeiro, Brazil
- Height: 1.81 m (5 ft 11 1/2 in)
- Position: Forward

Senior career*
Years	Team	Apps	(Gls)
2010	Chula United	30	(15)
2010–2011	Sriracha	36	(10)
2011–2013	Songkhla United	57	(20)
2013	Army United	15	(11)
2013–2014	Osotspa Saraburi	32	(15)
2014	Persib Bandung	0	(0)
2015	PTT Rayong	13	(5)
2015–2016	Nakhon Pathom United	28	(9)
2016	Super Power Samut Prakan	46	(18)
2016	Navy	11	(1)
2017	Krabi	14	(8)
2018–2019	Deffo		
- * Club domestic league appearances and goals as of 19:25, 22 June 2016 (UTC)

Aron Muniz Teixeira da Silva (born 2 December 1983) is a Brazilian retired footballer who played as a forward.

== Career ==
Aron Da Silva scored fifteen goals for Chula United F.C. in the 2010 Thai Division 1 League season. Newly promoted Sriracha F.C. signed him for their 2011 Thai Premier League campaign. He then went to Songkhla United and after that, he came to Army United. He made his debut for Army United against Chonburi.
