= Sugao Kambe =

Japanese footballer and manager

Sugao Kambe 神戸 清雄
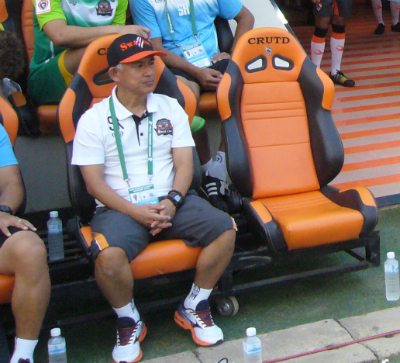

Personal information
- Full name: Sugao Kambe
- Date of birth: August 2, 1961 (age 65)
- Place of birth: Shizuoka, Japan

Youth career
- 1977–1979: Shizuoka High School
- 1980–1983: Waseda University

Senior career*
Years	Team	Apps	(Gls)
1984–1990	Honda	60	(2)
Total		60	(2)

International career
1989	Japan Futsal		

Managerial career
- 2000: JEF United Ichihara (caretaker)
- 2001: JEF United Ichihara (caretaker)
- 2002–2003: Philippines
- 2003–2005: Guam
- 2009: Northern Mariana Islands
- 2011: JEF United Chiba
- 2013–2016: Nakhon Ratchasima
- 2016–2017: Chiangmai
- 2018: Ubon UMT United
- 2019: Nongbua Pitchaya
- 2020–2021: Khon Kaen United
- 2021: Rayong
- 2023–2024: Sukhothai
- * Club domestic league appearances and goals

Sugao Kambe (神戸 清雄, Kambe Sugao; born August 2, 1961) is a Japanese football manager and former player who was recently the head coach of Thai League 1 club Sukhothai. He formerly managed The Philippines, Guam and Northern Mariana Islands national teams.

== Club career ==
Kambe was born in Shizuoka Prefecture on August 2, 1961. After graduating from Waseda University, he played for Honda from 1984 to 1990.

== Futsal career ==
In 1989, Kambe selected Japan national futsal team for 1989 Futsal World Championship in Netherlands.

== Coaching career ==
After retirement, Kambe started coaching career at Honda in 1990. In 1991, he moved to Furukawa Electric (later JEF United Chiba)and he coached until 2001. He also managed the club as caretaker in 2000 and 2001. From 2002, he managed national teams, Philippines (2002–2003), Guam (2003–2005) and Northern Mariana Islands (2009). In 2010, he returned to JEF United Chiba. In October 2011, he became a manager as Dwight Lodeweges successor. From 2013, he went to Thailand and managed Thai clubs.

== Managerial statistics ==
As of match played 26 May 2024

Managerial record by team and tenure
Team	From	To	Record				
Team	From	To	P	W	D	L	Win %
JEF United Ichihara	10 August 2000	14 October 2000	2	1	0	1	50.00
JEF United Chiba	21 October 2011	31 December 2011	10	3	2	5	30.00
Nakhon Ratchasima	29 July 2013	11 May 2016	45	15	11	19	33.33
Ubon UMT United	23 April 2018	30 November 2018	28	7	7	14	25.00
Nongbua Pitchaya	2 February 2019	25 June 2019	20	10	3	7	50.00
Khon Kaen United	10 November 2019	8 March 2021	27	16	6	5	59.26
Rayong F.C.	18 April 2021	11 December 2021	20	7	3	10	35.00
Sukhothai F.C.	25 November 2023	31 May 2024	25	8	4	13	32.00
Total			177	67	36	74	37.85

== Manager Honours ==
- Thai Division 1 League Winner: 2014
