= Ma Sang-hoon =

South Korean footballer

Personal information
- Date of birth: 25 July 1991 (age 35)
- Place of birth: South Korea
- Height: 1.83 m (6 ft 0 in)
- Position: Centre-back

Team information
- Current team: Cheonan City FC
- Number: 25

Youth career
- 2008–2010: Suncheon High School

Senior career*
Years	Team	Apps	(Gls)
2011–2012	Gangwon FC	0	(0)
2013–2014	BBCU F.C.		
2014–2016	Jeonnam Dragons	1	(0)
2016–2017	BBCU F.C.	25	(2)
2018–2019	Suwon FC	9	(0)
2018–2019	→ Sangju Sangmu (army)	16	(0)
2020–2023	Seongnam FC	61	(4)
2023	Hong Kong Rangers	7	(1)
2024–	Cheonan City FC	30	(0)
- * Club domestic league appearances and goals as of 7 January 2026

Ma Sang-hoon (Korean: 마상훈; born 25 July 1991) is a South Korean professional footballer who plays as a centre-back for Cheonan City FC.

== Club career ==
=== BBCU F.C. ===
Going back to BBCU F.C. of the Thai Premier League for the 2016 season, Ma made his debut for the Pink Panthers in a 2–0 victory over Sisaket, saying that Thai football has not changed that much since his 2013 spell with BBCU.

Ma returned to South Korea after BBCU was disbanded on account of depleted funds in 2017.

=== Rangers ===
On 26 July 2023, Ma joined Hong Kong Premier League club Rangers.
