= Diego Pishinin =

Brazilian footballer (born 1988)

Diego
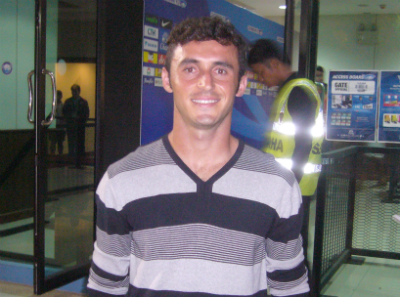

Personal information
- Full name: Diego Robert Pishinin Mendes
- Date of birth: January 1, 1988 (age 38)
- Place of birth: Santo Andre,
- Height: 1.84 m (6 ft 1/2 in)
- Position: Center back

Team information
- Current team: Suphanburi FC

Youth career
- 2003–2004: São Caetano
- 2005: Esporte
- 2006: Figueirense
- 2007: Atlético Tubarão

Senior career*
Years	Team	Apps	(Gls)
2008	São Vicente A.C.	10	(2)
2008	Chonburi	0	(0)
2009	→ Sriracha (loan)	27	(1)
2010–2013	Sriracha	108	(5)
2014	Pattaya United	32	(2)

Managerial career
- 2015–: Suphanburi (assistant)
- * Club domestic league appearances and goals

Diego Robert Pishinin Mendes (born January 1, 1988), sometimes known as just Diego, is a former Brazilian football player.

== Career ==
Diego Pishinin started his youth career as footballer at São Caetano in 2003 when he was 14. After having signed a contract with São Vicente A.C. in August 2008, he moved to Thailand in November 2008 where he joined Chonburi FC in off season. After two-month training with the club he was loaned to Sriracha FC with the beginning of 2009 and finally signed a permanent contract with the 2010 season.

He has helped his new side to win the Thai Division 1 title in 2010 and getting promoted to the TPL

In a game against Phuket FC in September 2013, Diego Pishinin made his 150 overall appearance for Sriracha FC.

== Honours ==
Sriracha FC

- Thai Division 1 League: 2010
