= Kim Hak-chul =

South Korean footballer and manager

Kim Hak-Chul
Personal information
- Full name: Kim Hak-Chul
- Date of birth: 4 November 1972 (age 53)
- Place of birth: Gangneung, Gangwon, South Korea
- Height: 1.78 m (5 ft 10 in)
- Position: Defender

Senior career*
Years	Team	Apps	(Gls)
1995–2002	Busan IPark	124	(1)
1998–1999	→ Sangmu (military service)		
2003	Daegu FC	35	(0)
2004–2008	Incheon United	125	(0)
Total		284	

International career
1998	South Korea	1	

Managerial career
- 2008–2010: Incheon United
- 2010–2012: Daegun High School (Incheon U-18)
- 2016: Pattaya United
- 2019–: Hwaseong FC
- * Club domestic league appearances and goals

Kim Hak-Chul (Korean: 김학철; born 4 November 1972) is a South Korean retired footballer and football manager. He played in the K League for 14 years from 1995 to 2009, and he has been rated by many fans as one of the best defenders in the K League. In 2009, he managed the Incheon United reserve team that became the R-League Champion.

== Club career ==
=== Busan Daewoo Royals ===
Kim Hak-chul signed with Busan Daewoo Royals in 1995, but he played only seven games in the early stages. From 1996, he was rated as a must-have player on the team. In 1997 he was rated as one of the K-League's best defenders and that year the Busan Daewoo Royals won the Adidas Cup 1997, Prospecs Cup 1997 and the League.

At that time, attackers like Hwang Sun-hong, Seo Jung-won, Kim Do-hoon, etc., rarely scored against Kim Hak-chul.
