= Narupon Wild =

Thai footballer (born 1988)

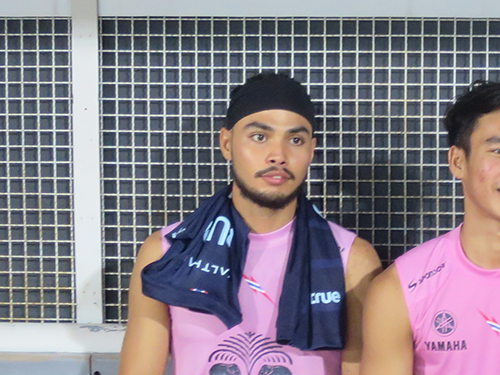

Personal information
- Full name: Narupon Wild Putsorn
- Date of birth: 21 July 1988 (age 38)
- Place of birth: Rayong, Thailand
- Height: 1.79 m (5 ft 10 1/2 in)
- Positions: Centre back; defensive midfielder

Youth career
- 2002–2005: AFC
- 2005–2006: The New Saints

Senior career*
Years	Team	Apps	(Gls)
2006–2008	The New Saints	1	(0)
2008–2011	Florida Tech Panthers	29	(7)
2011–2012	AGOVV Apeldoorn	0	(0)
2013	Bangkok United	3	(1)
2014	Songkhla United	6	(0)
2015–2016	BBCU	64	(4)
2017	Buriram United	6	(0)
2018–2019	Suphanburi	24	(0)
2019	Nakhon Ratchasima	5	(0)
2020	Melaka United	4	(0)
2021–2022	Chiangmai	25	(0)
Total		167	(12)

International career^{‡}
2003	Thailand U16	3	(0)
- * Club domestic league appearances and goals as of 04:22, 22 December 2022 (UTC) ‡ National team caps and goals as of 10 August 2015

Narupon Wild (Thai: นฤพน ไวลด์, born July 21, 1988), simply known as Nazza (Thai: น๊าซซ่า), is a Thai former professional footballer who plays as a midfielder.

== Club career ==
Nazza was born on the small island of Koh Samet in Thailand, and spent much of his childhood moving internationally.

He was primarily educated in the Dutch youth football system at AFC Amsterdam and in the English youth system at The New Saints F.C. After being offered a full scholarship to the Florida Institute of Technology, he again explored another part of the world playing for the Florida Tech Panthers. After graduating with a bachelor's degree in Business Administration, he returned to the Netherlands on trial at FC Volendam in the Jupiler League before signing a short-term contract with AGOVV Apeldoorn.

His first professional contract was with Bangkok United in the Thai 1st divisions. He helps them get a promotion to the Thai Premier League in his first year. 3 years later he joined BBCU F.C. and also helped them get promoted to the Thai Premier League while also being captain. After 2 successful season, Buriram United signed Nazza to a 3-year contract in 2016. He became a Thai Premier League Champion in 2017 and was then purchased by his current club Suphanburi FC in 2018.

== Honours ==
=== Club ===
The New Saints

- Welsh Premier League (1): 2006–07
- FAW Premier Cup (1): 2006–07

Buriram United

- Thai League 1 (1): 2017
- Mekong Club Championship (1): 2016
