= Adefolarin Durosinmi =

Nigerian footballer

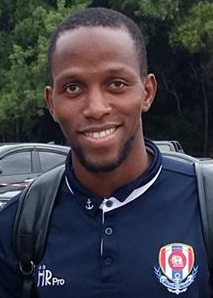

Personal information
- Full name: Gafar Adefolarin Durosinmi
- Date of birth: January 2, 1991 (age 35)
- Place of birth: Lagos, Nigeria
- Height: 1.78 m (5 ft 10 in)
- Position: Forward

Team information
- Current team: Kasetsart
- Number: 40

Senior career*
Years	Team	Apps	(Gls)
2009	Post Tel Club		
2010	RBAC		
2011–2014	Ayutthaya		
2015–2016	Sisaket	64	(18)
2017	Navy	28	(8)
2018	Samut Sakhon	19	(7)
2019–2020	Trat	34	(10)
2020–2021	Chonburi	16	(0)
2022	Navy	17	(8)
2022–2023	Uthai Thani	17	(6)
2023–2024	Nakhon Pathom United	22	(8)
2024–	Kasetsart	0	(0)
- * Club domestic league appearances and goals as of 21 October 2023

Gafar Adefolarin Durosinmi (born 2 January 1991) is a Nigerian footballer who plays as a forward for Thai League 2 club Kasetsart.
