= Julius Oiboh =

Nigerian footballer

Personal information
- Full name: Julius Oiboh
- Date of birth: 25 November 1990 (age 35)
- Place of birth: Lagos, Nigeria
- Height: 1.85 m (6 ft 1 in)
- Position: Forward

Senior career*
Years	Team	Apps	(Gls)
2010–2012	Nagaworld	24	(25)
2012–2013	Rangsit	30	(14)
2013	Air Force United	29	(12)
2014	BBCU	21	(17)
2014–2015	Thai Honda		
2015	Air Force United		
2015–2016	BBCU	26	(7)
2016–2017	Boeung Ket Angkor	0	(0)
2017	Pahang FA	0	(0)
2017	Navy	0	(0)
2017–2019	Boeung Ket		
- * Club domestic league appearances and goals

Julius Oiboh (born 25 November 1990) is a Nigerian football player who last played for Boeung Ket. He used to play for Navy.
