= Miloš Joksić =

Serbian football manager

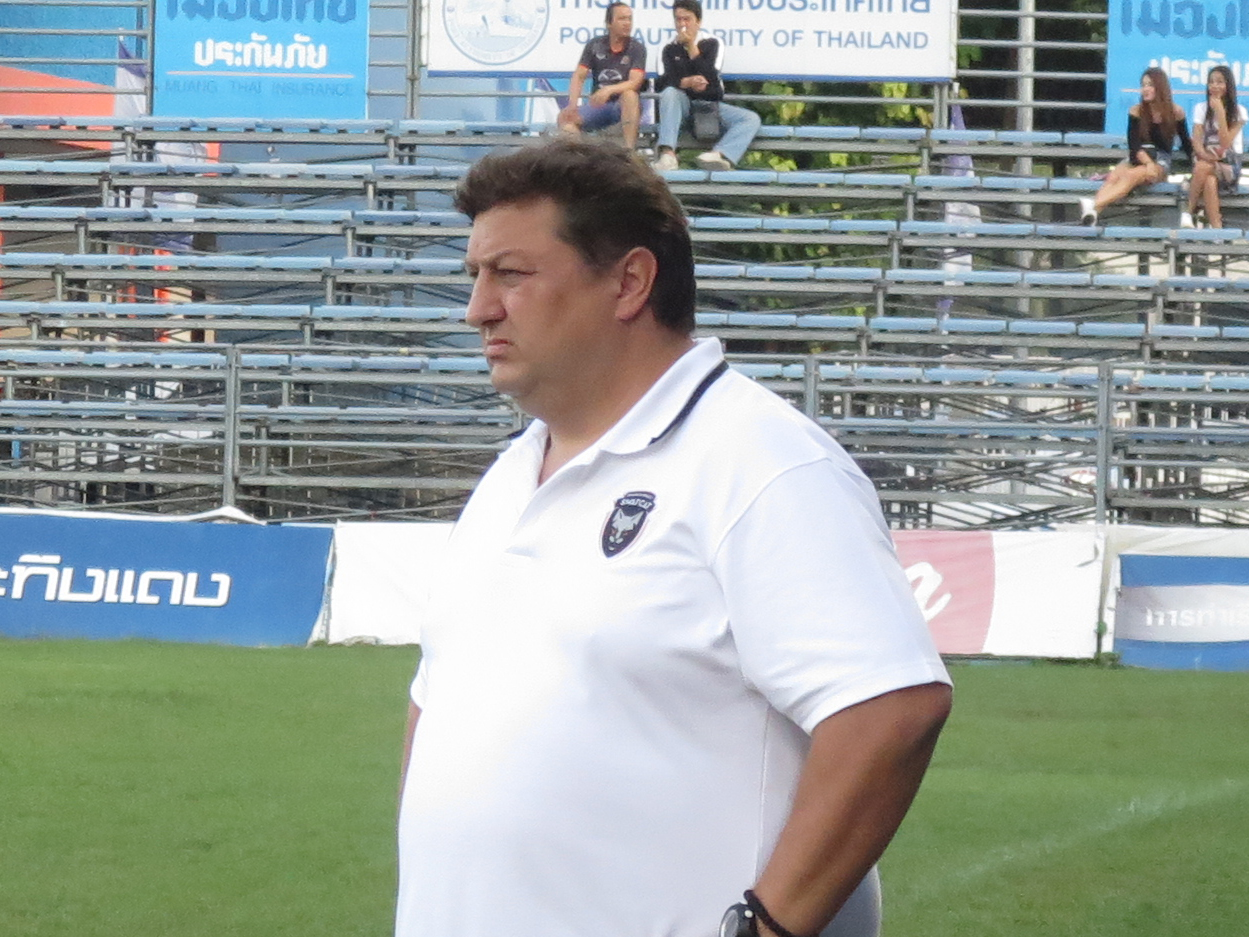
- Joksić as Nakhon Ratchasima manager in 2017

Personal information
- Full name: Miloš Joksić
- Date of birth: 26 March 1968 (age 58)
- Place of birth: Belgrade, SFR Yugoslavia

Team information
- Current team: Garudayaksa (head coach)

Managerial career
- Years: Team
- 2007: Radnički Pirot
- 2008: Srem
- 2010: Palilulac Beograd
- 2011: Rajpracha
- 2012: Phuket
- 2013: Mladenovac
- 2014–2015: Bangkok
- 2016: Pattaya United
- 2016–2019: Nakhon Ratchasima
- 2020: Ratchaburi Mitr Phol
- 2021–2023: Radnički Beograd
- 2023–2024: Muangthong United
- 2024–2025: Uthai Thani
- 2025–2026: Uthai Thani
- 2026–: Garudayaksa

Miloš Joksić (Serbian Cyrillic: Милош Јоксић; born 26 March 1968) is a Serbian professional football manager. He is currently the head coach of the Indonesia Super League club, Garudayaksa.

== Managerial career ==
In July 2012, Joksić resigned as manager of Phuket in Thailand. He later returned to Serbia and served as manager of Mladenovac in 2013.

In June 2016, just a month after leaving Pattaya United, Joksić was appointed as manager of fellow Thai club Nakhon Ratchasima. He parted ways with them in August 2019.

In November 2023, Joksić was appointed as head coach of Muangthong United.

== Managerial statistics ==
As of match played 20 November 2026

Managerial record by team and tenure
Team	Nat.	From	To	Record					Ref.
Team	Nat.	From	To	G	W	D	L	Win %	Ref.
Mladenovac	(Serbia)	1 January 2013	24 March 2013	2	0	1	1	0.00	
Pattaya United	(Thailand)	1 January 2016	28 May 2016	14	5	2	7	35.71	
Nakhon Ratchasima	(Thailand)	29 May 2016	26 August 2019	122	45	31	46	36.89	
Ratchaburi	(Thailand)	19 November 2020	25 December 2020	2	2	0	0	100.00	
Radnički Beograd	(Serbia)	11 August 2021	13 February 2023	23	10	3	10	43.48	
Muangthong United	(Thailand)	27 November 2023	23 June 2024	25	16	3	6	64.00	
Uthai Thani	(Thailand)	26 August 2024	2 May 2025	31	11	8	12	35.48	
Uthai Thani	(Thailand)	8 October 2025	13 May 2026	27	9	7	11	33.33	
Garudayaksa	(Indonesia)	21 July 2026	Present	10	4	2	4	40.00	
Career Total				256	102	57	97	39.84	

== Honours ==
=== Manager ===
Muangthong United

- Thai League Cup runner-up: 2023–24

Individual

- Thai League 1 Coach of the Month: March 2024
