= Pattaya United F.C. (2008) =

Thai football club

Pattaya United พัทยา ยูไนเต็ด
- Full name: Pattaya United Football Club
- Nicknames: The Blue Dolphins (โลมาสีนํ้าเงิน)
- Short name: PUTD
- Founded: 1989, as Coke Bangpra; 2008, as Pattaya United
- Dissolved: 2018 (became Samut Prakan City)
- Ground: Nong Prue Stadium; Pattaya, Chonburi, Thailand
- Capacity: 5,500
Home colours	Away colours	Third colours

Pattaya United Football Club (Thai: สโมสรฟุตบอลพัทยา ยูไนเต็ด) was a Thai defunct football club based in Pattaya, Chonburi Province. Defunct after the 2018 season, the club was renamed to Samut Prakan City and relocated to Samut Prakan.

== History ==
=== Coke-Bangpra Chonburi ===
The club was founded under the name Coke-Bangpra Chonburi FC which derived from the sponsor and the community Bang Phra in the district of Si Racha, the province of Chonburi. After several years in the Provincial League of Thailand, the club was promoted to the Thai Premier League for the 2008 season. As a result of the promotion to the TPL, the team was renamed to "Pattaya United" and moved to the city of Pattaya. In the first season in the top-flight division, the team finished in 11th place at the end of the season.

=== Pattaya United ===
The team moved to Pattaya for the 2008 season, and changed its name to Pattaya United FC (The Dolphins), in their first season under the new name the team finished in 11th place in the Thai Premier League, only avoiding relegation in the final game of the season. However, in the following seasons, the team improved to finishing as high as sixth, and fourth in 2010 and 2011 respectively. The team has always been looked at as a "little brother" team to Chonburi FC as they both were owned by the Kunpluem family, an affluence local family in Chonburi province. The club has shown potential, winning against teams with double or triple its annual budget, winning the hearts of Thai, and Foreign fans alike. After spending 6 years in the TPL, the Dolphins were relegated to the 2014 Thai Division 1 League in 2014. During the offseason, the future of the club was uncertain with various speculations.

However, in January 2015 the club was sold to Enigma Sports Ventures (ESV), the sporting arm of the Enigma Global. It marked the first change in ownership in the club history, after several lucrative bids were submitted for the Kunpluem family's consideration. The family and Pattaya United board felt that the club's best interest and future lie with Enigma Sports Ventures. The new ownership's management team moves very quickly in rebranding the club, appointing the new president is, Club's first foreign Head Coach, and securing 8 top players from TPL to play in Division One. Many players were former first elevens players from Muangthong United, as well as couple thai and foreign national team players. In 2016, Pattaya United was taken over by the Kiarti Thanee Group led by Tanet Phanichewa.

==== Renaming and relocation to Samut Prakan ====
At the end of season 2018, club owner decided to change the club name to Samut Prakan City and relocated to Samut Prakan Province due to local politic conflict.

== Rivalries ==
The club’s local rivals include Chonburi and Sriracha, all of which are based in Chonburi Province. Although the Kunpluem family previously had involvement with all three clubs, the teams have competed against each other.The clubs have not often competed in the same division; when matches have occurred, they have attracted significant attendance. In recent years, matches between Chonburi and Pattaya have been among the more notable fixtures in the province.

== Stadium ==
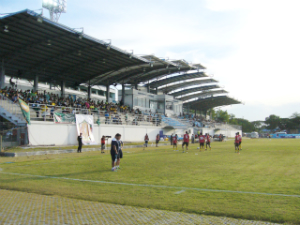
Nong Prue Stadium in 2013

Nong Prue Stadium, formally known as Nongprue Municipality Stadium in Pattaya originally designed to hold just over 3,000 spectators, but over the year the additional seats were required to accommodate more fans. So as the result of that, the stadium was renovated once in 2011. Under the new ownership of Enigma Sport Ventures, the stadium is currently undergo the renovation to accommodate up to 5,500 spectators. As well as additional required upgrades by the TPL to make the stadium competition worthy for the 2015 season. In addition to the renovation to the stadium, the new gift shop and club onsite office are added to the stadium ground.

=== Stadium and locations by season records ===
Coordinates	Location	Stadium	Capacity	Year
13°21′52″N 100°58′35″E	Chonburi	Chonburi Municipality Stadium	8,680	2008
12°55′28″N 100°56′14″E	Chonburi	Nong Prue Stadium	7,000	2009–2010
13°24′41″N 100°59′37″E	Chonburi	IPE Chonburi Stadium	11,000	2011
12°55′28″N 100°56′14″E	Chonburi	Nong Prue Stadium	5,500	2012–2018

== Season-by-season records ==
Season	League									FA Cup	Queen's Cup	Kor Royal Cup	League Cup	Top scorer	
Season	Division	P	W	D	L	F	A	Pts	Pos	FA Cup	Queen's Cup	Kor Royal Cup	League Cup	Name	Goals
2007	DIV 1	22	11	8	3	30	14	41	2nd				–		
2008	TPL	30	8	11	11	24	27	35	11th				–	Tana Chanabut	4
2009	TPL	30	7	11	12	27	33	32	11th	R4	SF	–	–	Anderson Machado	4
2010	TPL	30	12	9	9	43	38	45	6th	QF	QF	–	QF	Ludovick Takam	17
2011	TPL	34	14	11	9	38	27	53	4th	R5	–	–	R2	O. J. Obatola	8
2012	TPL	34	9	10	15	35	47	37	15th	R3	–	–	R3	Kengne Ludovick	10
2013	TPL	32	9	2	21	39	66	29	17th	R3	–	–	R2	Rod Dyachenko	7
2014	DIV 1	34	12	5	17	42	53	41	14th	R2	–	–	R3	Cristiano Lopes	14
2015	DIV 1	38	18	11	9	77	40	65	2nd	R1	–	–	QF	Milan Bubalo	20
2016	TL	31	9	7	15	46	66	34	12th	R2	–	–	R3	Júnior Negrão	20
2017	T1	34	15	6	13	60	53	51	8th	R2	–	–	R2	Miloš Stojanović	15
2018	T1	34	13	7	14	50	62	46	8th	R2	–	–	R2	Lukian	18

Champions	Runners-up	Third place	Promoted	Relegated

- P = Played
- W = Games won
- D = Games drawn
- L = Games lost
- F = Goals for
- A = Goals against
- Pts = Points
- Pos = Final position
- TPL = Thai Premier League
- TL = Thai League 1
- DIV 1 = 2015 Thai Division 1 League
- QR1 = First Qualifying Round
- QR2 = Second Qualifying Round
- QR3 = Third Qualifying Round
- QR4 = Fourth Qualifying Round
- RInt = Intermediate Round
- R1 = Round 1
- R2 = Round 2
- R3 = Round 3
- R4 = Round 4
- R5 = Round 5
- R6 = Round 6
- GR = Group stage
- QF = Quarter-finals
- SF = Semi-finals
- RU = Runners-up
- S = Shared
- W = Winners

== Coaches ==
Coaches by Years (2007–2018)

- (Thailand) Pansak Ketwattha 2007–2009
- (Thailand) Jadet Meelarp 2009
- (Thailand) Thawatchai Damrong-Ongtrakul 2010
- (Thailand) Jatuporn Pramualban 2010–2011
- (Thailand) Chalermwoot Sa-ngapol 2011–2013
- (Thailand) Jadet Meelarp 2013
- (Thailand) Songyod Klinsrisook 2013–2014
- (England) Sean Sainsbury 2015
- (Thailand) Surapong Kongthep 2015
- (South Korea) Lim Jong-heon 2015
- (Serbia) Miloš Joksić 2016
- (South Korea) Kim Hak-chul 2016
- (Thailand) Surapong Kongthep 2016–2018

== Honours ==
=== Domestic ===
- Thai League 2
  - Runners-up (1): 2015
