= Jatuporn Pramualban =

Thai football coach (born 1970)

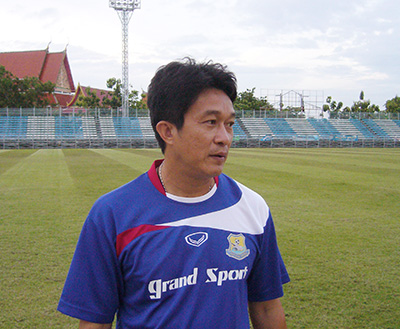

Personal information
- Full name: Jatuporn Pramualban
- Date of birth: 25 September 1970 (age 56)
- Place of birth: Thailand
- Position: Defender

Senior career*
Years	Team	Apps	(Gls)
1992–2000	Thai Farmers Bank		

Managerial career
- 2010: Thailand women
- 2011: Pattaya United
- 2013–2015: TTM Custom
- 2013–2014: Thailand women
- 2016: Assumption United
- 2016: BBCU
- 2017: Thailand U19 (interim)
- 2024: Police Tero (interim)
- * Club domestic league appearances and goals ‡ National team caps and goals as of June 10, 2016

Jatuporn Pramualban (Thai: จตุพร ประมลบาล, born September 25, 1970), also known as Coach Jun (Thai: โค้ชจุ่น), is a Thai football coach.

== Honours ==
Player

Clubs

Thai Farmers Bank

- AFC Champions League Champions; 1994, 1995
- Thai League T1 Champions; 1991, 1992, 1993, 1995
- Queen's Cup Champions; 1994, 1995
- Afro-Asian Club Championship Champions; 1994

Manager

International

Thailand (Women's)

- 2013 Southeast Asian Games Gold Medals

Thailand (Men U19)

- Jockey Club International Youth Tournament Champions; 2017
