= Ali Diarra =

Ivorian footballer

Personal information
- Date of birth: 10 January 1988 (age 38)
- Place of birth: Abidjan, Ivory Coast
- Height: 1.85 m (6 ft 1 in)
- Position: Midfielder

Youth career
- –2003: Académie MimoSifcom

Senior career*
Years	Team	Apps	(Gls)
2004–2007	ASEC Mimosas		
2008	Issia Wazy		
2009–2010	Phuket	32	(11)
2011–2013	Muangthong United	18	(4)
2012	→ Suphanburi (loan)	32	(6)
2013	→ Singhtarua (loan)	30	(0)
2014–2015	Port	15+	(0+)
2016	BBCU	17	(0)
2017	Udon Thani	25	(5)
2018	Bangkok		
- * Club domestic league appearances and goals

Ali Diarra (born 10 January 1988) is an Ivorian footballer who plays as a midfielder.

== Career ==
Diarra began his career in 2004 at ASEC. In January 2010, he signed for Thai club Phuket F.C. In January 2011, he joined Muangthong United F.C. on a five-year deal. He went to Suphanburi F.C. on loan in 2012, and helped the club gain promotion to the Premier League. He returned to Muangthong United after his loan expired in December. In 2013, Diarra was loaned to Singhtarua F.C.
