= Jeong Woo-geun =

South Korean footballer (born 1991)

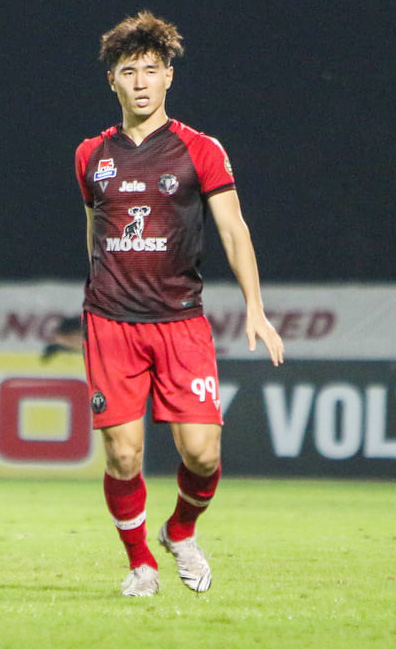
- Jeong playing for Chiangmai United in 2021

Personal information
- Date of birth: 1 March 1991 (age 35)
- Place of birth: Daejeon, South Korea
- Height: 1.75 m (5 ft 9 in)
- Position: Striker

Team information
- Current team: Chiangmai United
- Number: 7

Youth career
- –2007: Daejeon Hana Citizen
- 2007–2011: FC Korea

Senior career*
Years	Team	Apps	(Gls)
2011–2013	Rajpracha	19	(8)
2013–2014	Navy	26	(10)
2014–2015	Nakhon Pathom United	64	(36)
2015–2016	BBCU	28	(11)
2016–2018	PTT Rayong	24	(12)
2018–2019	Suwon FC	14	(2)
2019	Gimpo FC	0	(0)
2019–2020	Ayutthaya United	17	(8)
2020–2021	Chiangmai United	29	(13)
2021–2022	Sukhothai	33	(10)
2022–2023	Police Tero	34	(17)
2024–2025	PT Prachuap	30	(9)
2025	Nakhon Pathom United	11	(0)
2026–	Chiangmai United	0	(0)
- * Club domestic league appearances and goals as of 1 January 2026

Jeong Woo-geun (Korean: 정우근; born 1 March 1991) is a South Korean professional footballer as a striker for Thai League 2 club Chiangmai United.

Jeong has spent most of his career playing in Thailand. From January 2019 to June 2019, he completed six months of obligatory military service in South Korea in the form of social service

== Club career ==
In January 2011, Jeong moved to Thailand to sign with Rajpracha.

It was announced in January 2016 that Jeong would leave the Nakhon Pathom United and join BBCU.

On 22 January 2018, Jeong returned to South Korea to sign with K League 2 club Suwon FC.

On 1 April 2019, Jeong signed with Gimpo FC.

On 19 June 2019, Jeong returned to Thailand to sign with Ayutthaya United.
