= Nonthaburi Youth Centre =

Sports venue in Thailand

Nonthaburi Youth Centre Stadium
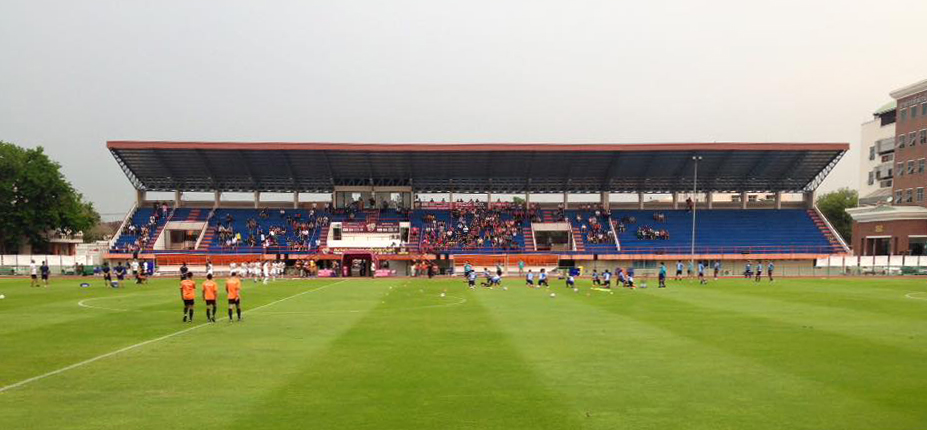
- Interactive map of Nonthaburi Youth Centre Stadium
- Location: Nonthaburi, Thailand
- Coordinates: 13°52′44″N 100°32′39″E
- Owner: Nonthaburi Municipality
- Operator: Nonthaburi Municipality
- Capacity: 6,000
- Surface: Grass

Nonthaburi Youth Centre Stadium (Thai: สนามกีฬาศูนย์เยาวชนเฉลิมพระเกียรติ นนทบุรี หรือ สนามเทศบาลนครนนท์) is a multi-purpose stadium in Nonthaburi province, Thailand. It is currently used mostly for football matches. The stadium holds 6,000 people.
