= BBCU F.C. =

Thai football club

BBCU บีบีซียู เอฟซี
- Full name: Big Bang Chula United Football Club สโมสรฟุตบอลบีบีซียู
- Nicknames: The Pink Panthers (เสือสามย่าน)
- Founded: 1976, as Bangtoey Football Team; 2004, as Chula-Sinthana; 2008, as Chula United; 2011, as Big Bang Chula United
- Dissolved: 2017
- Ground: Nonthaburi Youth Centre Stadium; Nonthaburi, Thailand
- Capacity: 6,000
Home colours	Away colours

BBCU Football Club, officially known as Big Bang Chula United Football Club (Thai: สโมสรฟุตบอลบีบีซียู), was a Thai professional football club based in Bangkok, Thailand, and owned by Montri Suwannoi. The club was dissolved in 2017. Founded as "Bangtoey Football Team" in 1976, The club changed its name several times, becoming Big Bang Chula United in 2011.

BBCU's predecessor, Sinthana FC, was one of the successful Thai football clubs of the late 1990s. The club won one Thai League 1 title, two Kor Royal Cups and one Thai FA Cup. Moreover, during the years in lower divisions, the club has also won a Division 2 title.

== History ==
Chulalongkorn University FC is a club based at Chulalongkorn University in Bangkok, Thailand. They have played in the Chula–Thammasat Traditional Football Match since 1934.

In 2004, "Chulalongkorn University FC" was combined with "Sinthana FC" and took the name, "Chula–Sinthana FC" which played in Division 2 in 2005 until Chula-Sinthana FC was promoted from Division 1 to Thai Premier League in 2008.

In August of the 2008 season, they changed their club name again from "Chula–Sinthana FC" to "Chula United". The Club Director was Kasiti Kamalanavin.

Chula's return to the top flight, 2008 Thailand Premier League, ended with them finishing in a creditable 8th position. However, they could not build on their first season and were relegated from the 2009 Thai Premier League.

Despite having two of the three top goalscorers in the 2010 Thai Division 1 League, Chula could not bounce back at the first attempt and slumped to a disappointing 10th–placed finish. Chula's striker Chainarong Tathong topped the 2010 Thai Division 1 League goalscoring chart with an impressive 19 goals. Fellow frontman Aron da Silva netted 15 times to be the 3rd top scorer in the league.

=== Big Bang Chula United ===
In January 2011, the club changed its name to "Big Bang Chula United" and relocated to play their home games at the Thai Army Sports Stadium on Vibhavadi Rangsit Road. The club got off to a flying start and won promotion despite stuttering in the latter weeks of the season.

The club's venture in the 2012 Thai Premier League ended with them being relegated after only one season. Home games were played at the sparsely filled 65,000 Rajamangala Stadium with an average home attendance of only 939.

In April 2017, the club was dissolved, citing a lack of funds as the reason. This team is automatically banned for 2 years, If the team decides to come back they will relegated to the lowest tier of the professional league.

== Stadium and locations ==
Coordinates	Location	Stadium	Capacity	Year
13°44′15″N 100°31′31″E	Bangkok	Chulalongkorn University Sports Stadium	15,000	2007–2010
13°46′58″N 100°33′22″E	Phaya Thai, Bangkok	Thai Army Sports Stadium	20,000	2011
13°45′20″N 100°37′20″E	Bang Kapi, Bangkok	Rajamangala Stadium	65,000	2012
13°46′58″N 100°33′22″E	Phaya Thai, Bangkok	Thai Army Sports Stadium	20,000	2013
13°52′44″N 100°32′39″E	Nonthaburi	Nonthaburi Youth Centre Stadium (Nonthaburi Municipality Stadium)	6,000	2014–2017

== Season by season record ==
=== Amateur years (1976–1987) ===
Since Bangtoey Football team was founded in 1976 to compete in Bangkapi Cup tournament, the club had played 11 more years in amateur level before joining the first Football Association of Thailand's competitions season in Ngor Royal Cup 1998.

=== Royal Cups' years (1988–1995) ===
Season	Competition	Level	Final position	Note
1988	Ngor Royal Cup	4	Runner–up	– Promoted to Khor Royal Cup 1989
1989	Khor Royal Cup	3	Quarter–final	– Promoted to Khǒr Royal Cup 1990
1990	Khǒr Royal Cup	2		
1991	Khǒr Royal Cup	2		
1992	Khǒr Royal Cup	2		– Promoted to Kor Royal Cup 1993
1993	Kor Royal Cup	1	1st round	
1994	Kor Royal Cup	1		
1995	Kor Royal Cup	1	3rd	– the last season that Kor Royal Cup was competed as the top level of Thai football.

=== Football League years (1996–2010) ===
Season	Competition	Level	Final position	Note
1996	(Johny Walker); Thailand Soccer League	1	6th	– Football league was pronounced for the first time in Thailand – The club won Queen's Cup runner–up.
1997	(Johny Walker); Thailand Soccer League	1	Runner-up	– Champion Kor Royal Cup – Champion FA Cup (qualified for Asian Cup Winners' Cup 1998/99)
1998	(Caltex); Premier League	1	Champion	– Qualified for Asian Club Championship (1999–00) [as Thai League Champion] – Champion Kor Royal Cup
1999	(Caltex); Premier League	1	7th	
2000	(Caltex); Premier League	1	11th	– Played promotion–relegation play–off with Bangkok Christian College (won 3–2 on aggregate) – Runner–up Queen's Cup
2001–02	(GSM); Thai League	1	5th	
2002–03	(GSM); Thai League	1	7th	– Runner–up Queen's Cup
2003–04	Thailand Premier League	1	10th	– Relegated to Thailand Division 1 League 2004–05
2004–05	Thailand Division 1 League	2		– Relegated to Thailand Division 2 League 2006
2006	Thailand Division 2 League	3	Champion	– Promoted to Thailand Division 1 League ฤดูกาล 2007
2007	Thailand Division 1 League	2	Runner-up	– Promoted to Thailand Premier League 2008
2008	Thailand Premier League	1	8th	
2009	Thailand Premier League	1	15th	– Relegated to Thai Division 1 League 2010
2010	Thai Division 1 League	2	10th	

=== Season by season domestic record (2011–present) ===
Season	League									FA Cup	League Cup	Kor Royal Cup	Asia	Top scorer	
Season	Division	P	W	D	L	F	A	Pts	Pos	FA Cup	League Cup	Kor Royal Cup	Asia	Name	Goals
2011	DIV 1	34	18	9	7	39	25	63	3rd					Chainarong Tathong	12
2012	TPL	34	4	13	17	32	63	25	17th					Junior Aparecido Guimaro	9
2013	DIV 1	34	9	13	12	33	45	40	11th	R3	R2			Bouba Abbo	9
2014	DIV 1	34	13	9	12	49	48	48	9th	R2	R3			Julius Obioh	17
2015	DIV 1	38	17	9	12	50	42	60	4th	R2	R2			Yusuke Kato	14
2016	TL	30	3	4	23	32	69	13	18th	R1	R2			Jeong Woo-geun	12
2017						Dissolved									

Champions	Runners-up	Third place	Promoted	Relegated

- P = Played
- W = Games won
- D = Games drawn
- L = Games lost
- F = Goals for
- A = Goals against
- Pts = Points
- Pos = Final position
- TL = Thai League 1
- QR1 = First Qualifying Round
- QR2 = Second Qualifying Round
- QR3 = Third Qualifying Round
- QR4 = Fourth Qualifying Round
- RInt = Intermediate Round
- R1 = Round 1
- R2 = Round 2
- R3 = Round 3
- R4 = Round 4
- R5 = Round 5
- R6 = Round 6
- GR = Group stage
- QF = Quarter-finals
- SF = Semi-finals
- RU = Runners-up
- S = Shared
- W = Winners

Note

- The list below shows the different names used to represent the same level of competition.
  - Level 1 : (Johny Walker) Thailand Soccer League, (Caltex) Premier League, (GSM) Thai League, Thailand Premier League, and (Sponsor) Thai Premier League
  - Level 2 : Thailand Division 1 League and Thai Division 1 League

== Performance in AFC competitions ==
Season	Competition	Round		Club	Home	Away
1999–2000	Asian Club Championship	First round	(Macau)	Lam Pak	0–2	7–1
		Second round	(Singapore)	Singapore Armed Force	1–1	2–1
		Quarter-finals	(Japan)	Júbilo Iwata		2–1
			(South Korea)	Suwon Samsung Bluewings		4–0
			(Japan)	Kashima Antlers		3–0

== Coaches ==
Coaches by Years (2008–present)

Name	Nat	Period	Honours
Kiatisuk Senamuang	(Thailand)	2008	
Thongchai Sukkoki	(Thailand)	2008–2009	
Kiatisuk Senamuang	(Thailand)	2011–2012	Thai Division 1 League 3rd Place
Jose Alves Borges	(Brazil)	2013	
Worachai Surinsirirat	(Thailand)	2013–2015	
Tsuyoshi Takano	(Japan)	2015–2016	
Koichi Sugiyama	(Japan)	2016	
Jatuporn Pramualban	(Thailand)	2016	
Pairoj Borwonwatanadilok	(Thailand)	2017	
Worachai Surinsirirat (interim)	(Thailand)	2017	

== Honours ==
=== Domestic competitions ===
- Thai League 1
  - Champions (1): 1998
  - Runner–up (1): 1997
- Thai Division 1 League
  - Runner–up (1): 2007
  - 3rd Place (1): 2011
- Regional League Division 2
  - Champions (1): 2006
- Thai FA Cup
  - Winners (1): 1997
- Kor Royal Cup
  - Winners (2): 1997, 1998
  - 3rd Place (1): 1995
- Queen's Cup
  - Runner–up (3): 1999, 2000, 2002

=== International competitions ===
- Asian Club Championship
  - Quarter-final (1): 1999
- Asian Cup Winners' Cup
  - Second round (1): 1998
