= Samuel (name) =

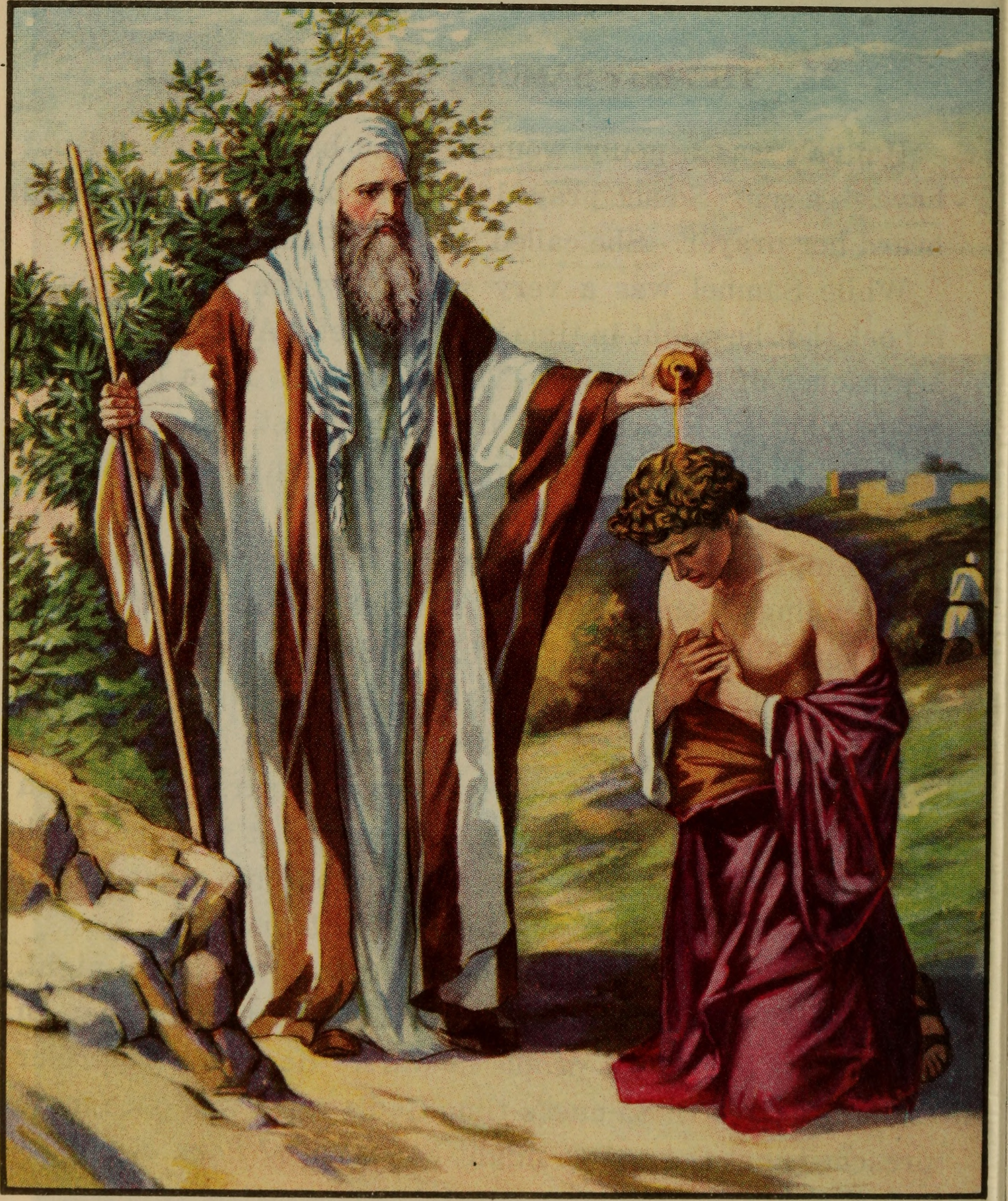
- Samuel anointing David
- Pronunciation: English: /ˈsæmjuːəl, -jəl/ French: [samɥɛl] Spanish: [saˈmwel] Portuguese: [sɐmuˈɛl] German: [ˈzaːmuːʔeːl] Finnish: [ˈsɑmuel] Slovak: [ˈsamuel]
- Gender: Male

Origin
- Origin: Hebrew
- Meaning: Name of God

Other names
- Nicknames: Sam, Sammy, Sami, Sammi, Sammie, Samy
- Related names: Sam, Sammy, Samantha, Sameth, Samberg, Shmuel

Samuel (Hebrew: שְׁמוּאֵל Šəmūʾēl, Tiberian: Šămūʾēl) is a male name and a surname of Hebrew origin. It means "name of God", deriving from the Hebrew Shem (שֵׁם) (which means "name") + ʾĒl (which means "God" or "deity"). However, from the explanation given in 1 Samuel 1:20, the name could alternatively come from a contraction of the Hebrew שְׁאִלְתִּיו מֵאֵל (Modern: Šəʾīltīv mēʾĒl, Tiberian: Šĭʾīltīw mēʾĒl), meaning "I have asked/borrowed him from God". This is the verse in which the Prophet Samuel's mother Hannah names her son, after praying that she would be able to give birth. Her prayers having been answered, she dedicates the child to God as a Nazirite. Samuel was the last of the ruling judges in the Old Testament. He anointed Saul to be the first King of Israel and later anointed David.

As a Christian name, Samuel came into common use after the Protestant Reformation. Famous bearers include the American inventor Samuel F. B. Morse (1791–1872), the Irish writer Samuel Beckett (1906–89) and the American author Samuel Clemens (1835–1910), who wrote under the pen name Mark Twain.

The name Samuel is popular amongst Black Africans, as well as among African Americans who follow Christianity and Islam alike. It is also widespread amongst the modern Jewish communities, especially Sephardic Jews and Ashkenazi Jews. It is also quite popular in countries that speak English, French, German, Dutch, Spanish, and Portuguese, as well as in Ireland, Scotland, Wales, Scandinavia, Italy, Romania, Poland, Hungary, the Czech Republic, Slovakia, Slovenia and Croatia.

== Translations ==
- Amharic: ሳሙኤል(Samuel)
- Arabic: صموئيل (Ṣamūʾīl), شموئيل (Šamūʾīl)
- Armenian: Սամվել (Samvel), Սամուէլ (Samuēl)
- Azerbaijani: İsmayıl
- Belarusian: Самуіл (Samuil)
- Bulgarian: Самуил (Samuil)
- Burmese: ဆမ်မြူရယ် (Sam, myu, yal)
- Cantonese: 森姆 (Summo)
- Chinese Simplified: 塞缪尔 (Sàimiù'ěr)
- Chinese Traditional: 山繆 (Shānmiù)
- Croatian: Samuel
- Czech: Samuel
- Danish: Samuel
- Dutch: Samuel
- English: Samuel, Sam, Sammy
- Esperanto: Samuele
- Estonian: Saamuel
- Faroese: Sámal
- Filipino: Samuél
- Finnish: Samuel, Samuli, Sami, Samppa, Samu
- French: Samuel
- Galician: Samuel
- German: Samuel
- Georgian: სამუელი (Samueli)
- Greek: Σαμουήλ (Samouí̱l, Samouēl)
- Gujarati: સેમ્યુઅલ (Sēmyu'ala)
- Hawaiian: Kamuela
- Hebrew: שְׁמוּאֵל (Modern: Šmūʾēl or Šəmūʾēl, Tiberian: Šămūʾēl)
- Hindi: सैमुअल (Saimu'ala)
- Hungarian: Sámuel, Sami, Samu
- Icelandic: Samúel
- Indonesian: Samuel
- Irish: Somhairle (So-ar-la)
- Italian: Samuele, Samüèle
- Japanese: サミュエル (Samyueru), サムエル (Samueru)
- Javanese: ꦱꦩꦸꦮꦺꦭ꧀ (Samuwèl)
- Kannada: ಸ್ಯಾಮ್ಯುಯೆಲ್ (Syāmyuyel)
- Khmer: សាំយូអែល (Samyouel)
- Korean: 사무엘 (Samuel)
- Kyrgyz: Ысмайыл (Ismayıl)
- Latin: Samuel
- Macedonian: Самуил (Sámuil, Samoil)
- Malayalam: ശമുവേൽ (Śhamu'vēl)
- Malagasy: Samoela
- Maltese: Samwel
- Māori: Hamuera
- Marathi: शमुवेल (Śamuvēla)
- Mongolian: Самуел (Samuyel)
- Nepali: शमूएल (Śamū'ēla)
- Northern Sami: Sámmol
- Norwegian: Samuel
- Old French: Samoël
- Persian: ساموئل (Sâmu'el)
- Polish: Samuel
- Portuguese: Samuel
- Punjabi: ਸਮੂਏਲ (Samū'ēla)
- Romanian: Samuel
- Russian: Самуил (Samuil, Samuel, Shamil), Самойло (Samojlo)
- Serbian: Самуило (Samuilo)
- Shona: Samero or Samere
- Slovak: Samuel, Samo or Samko
- Slovene: Samuel
- Spanish: Samuel
- Swahili: Samweli
- Swedish: Samuel, Sami
- Tamil: சாமுவேல் (Sāmuvēl)
- Telugu: సమూయేలు (Śāmūyelu)
- Thai: ซามูเอล (Sāmūxel)
- Turkish: İsmail (Samuel)
- Ukrainian: Самійло (Samíilo)
- Urdu: سیموئیل
- Welsh: Sawyl
- Yiddish: שמואל (Shmuel)
- Yoruba: Samueli
- Samoa: Samuelu

== Notable people ==
Samuel may refer to: (see also: Sam, Sammy, etc.)

=== Given name ===
- Samuel (11th century BC), Biblical prophet
- Samo (*? – † 658/659), first ruler of the Slavic people
- Samuel (musician) (born 1987), American indie pop artist
- Samuel of Bulgaria (r. 997–1014), Emperor of the First Bulgarian Empire
- Samuel of Ctesiphon (r. 614–624), Syriac Orthodox Grand Metropolitan of the East
- Samuel of Nehardea (c. 165–257), Talmudist
- Samuel Aba (r. 1041–1044), third King of Hungary
- Samuel Adams (1722–1803), founding father of the United States
- Samuel Adamson, Australian-British playwright
- Samuel Aldegheri (born 2001), Italian baseball player
- Samuel Alito (born 1950), associate justice of the U.S. Supreme Court since 2006
- Samuel Amofa (born 1999), Ghanaian footballer
- Samuel Anini Junior (born 2003), Finnish footballer
- Samuel Antwi (born 1991), English professional boxer
- Samuel Armstead (c. 1804–1908), American politician, minister, restaurateur
- Samuel Arredondo (born 2002), American singer based in South Korea
- Samuel Arruda (1949–2006), Brazilian footballer
- Samuel Howell Ashbridge (1848–1906), American politician, mayor of Philadelphia
- Shmuel Avishar (born 1947), Israeli basketball player
- Samuel Ballet (born 2001), Swiss footballer
- Samuel Barber (1910–1981), American composer
- V.C. Samuel (1912–1998) Ecumenical Theologian and Historian
- Samuel L. M. Barlow I (1826–1889), American lawyer
- Samuel L. M. Barlow II (1892–1982), American composer
- Samuel Barnett (disambiguation), multiple people, including:
  - Samuel Barnett (reformer) (1844–1913), English clergyman and social reformer
  - Samuel Jackson Barnett (1873–1956), American physicist, discoverer of the Barnett effect
  - Samuel Barnett (actor) (born 1980), English actor
- Samuel Bartsch (born 1990), German-born Japanese voice actor better known as Subaru Kimura
- Samuel Beckett (1906–1989), Irish writer
- Samuel Berger (boxer) (1884–1925), American heavyweight boxer
- Shmuley Boteach (born 1966), American orthodox rabbi, radio and television host, and author
- Samuel W. Buel (1830–1895), American businessman and politician
- Samuel P. Bush (1863–1948), American industrialist, patriarch of the Bush political family
- Samuel Caires (born 2003), Brazilian politician
- Samuel de Champlain (1567–1635), French explorer of Canada
- Samuel Clemens, birth name of Mark Twain (1835–1910), American author and humorist
- Samuel Taylor Coleridge, (1772–1834), English poet
- Samuel Colt (1814–1862), American inventor and industrialist
- Samuel Conway (born 1965), American chemical researcher and furry convention organizer
- Samuel Cosmi (born 1999), American football player
- Samuel Cunningham (footballer) (born 1989), Thai footballer
- Samuel Thomas Currin, American judge
- Samuel Thomas Currin II (born 1984), American judge
- Samuel Dahan (born 1984), French law professor
- Samuel Dahl (born 2003), Swedish footballer
- Samuel Edmund Sewall (1799–1888), American lawyer, abolitionist, and suffragist
- Samuel Egadu (born 1988), Ugandan sprinter
- Samuel Eguavoen (born 1993), American football player
- Samuel Eto'o (born 1981), Cameroonian football player
- Samuel Fatu (born 1965), American professional wrestler and member of Anoaʻi family
- Samuel Francis Du Pont (1803–1865), Rear Admiral in the US Navy
- Samuel Firmino de Jesus (born 1986), Brazilian footballer
- Samuel Frauenthal (1862–1935), associate justice of the Arkansas Supreme Court
- Samuel Gbonda, Sierra Leonean bishop
- Samuel Gibbs French (1818–1910), American military officer, Confederate Major General and planter
- Samuel Gidi (born 2004), Slovak football player.
- Samuel "Sam" Fuld (born 1981), American major league baseball outfielder and general manager
- Samuel Goldwyn (1882–1974), Polish-American film producer
- Samuel Goudsmit (1902–1978) – Dutch-American physicist
- Samuel Goodman (disambiguation), multiple people, including:
  - Samuel Goodman (cricketer) (1877–1905), American cricketer
  - Samuel Goodman (rugby union) (fl. 1920–1924), American rugby union player and manager
- Samuel Hernández, Puerto Rican Christian music singer
- Sam Horn, (born 1963), American baseball player
- Sam Horn (American football) (born 2006), American football and baseball player
- Samuel "Shemp" Howard (birth name Samuel Horwitz), American actor and comedian, one of the original Three Stooges
- Samuel Hui (born 1948), Hong Kong Cantopop musician, singer, songwriter, and actor
- Samuel Huntington (disambiguation), multiple people, including:
  - Samuel Huntington (statesman) (1731–1796), American jurist, statesman, and revolutionary leader
  - Samuel Huntington (Ohio politician) (1765–1817), American jurist, Governor of Ohio
  - Samuel P. Huntington (1927–2008), American political scientist
- Samuel L. Jackson (born 1948), American film and television actor and film producer
- Samuel Johannesson (born 2000), Swedish ice hockey player
- Samuel Johnson (1709–1784), English writer
- Samuel (singer) (born 2002), American singer based in South Korea
- Samuel Kullmann (born 1986), Swiss politician
- Samuel Tak Lee (born 1939), Hong Kong property billionaire
- Samuel A. LeBlanc I (1886–1955), American politician and judge
- Samuel Little (1940–2020), American serial killer and rapist
- Samuel Martin (disambiguation), multiple people
- Samuel Martires (born 1949), Filipino lawyer and current Ombudsman of the Philippines
- Samuel "Sam" Match (1923–2010), American tennis player
- Samuel "Sam" McCullum (born 1952), American football wide receiver
- Samuel McDowell (1735–1817), soldier and political leader in Kentucky
- Samuel McKinney (1807–1879), Irish-born Presbyterian minister in the American South
- Samuel Mellitz (1891–1982), associate justice of the Connecticut Supreme Court
- Samuel Mercer (1799–1862), American naval officer
- Samuel Migaľ (born 1982), Slovak politician
- Samuel Miklos Stern (1920–1969), Hungarian–British Orientalist
- Samuel Mills (disambiguation), multiple people
- Samuel Moreira (born 1963), Brazilian politician
- Sam Moran (born 1978), member of The Wiggles from 2006–2012
- Samuel Eliot Morison (1887–1976), American historian, professor, and Rear Admiral
- Samuel Morse (1791–1872), American inventor and artist
- Samuel George Morton (1799–1851), American physician, natural scientist and writer
- Samuel Mosberg, American Olympic champion lightweight boxer
- Samuel M'Pemba (born 2004), American football player
- Samuel Mukooza (born 1989), Ugandan basketball player
- Shamuel Nachmias (born 1954), Israeli basketball player
- Samuel Nadeau (born 1982), French basketball player
- Samuel Tettey Nettey (1909–2007), Ghanaian politician
- Samuel Nightingale (1715–1786), justice of the Colonial Rhode Island Supreme Court
- Samuel Ogeh (born 1968), Rivers State politician
- Samuel Okunlola (born 2003), American football player
- Samuel Okwir, Ugandan politician
- Samuel Allyne Otis (1740–1814), Secretary of the US Senate
- Samuel Pepys (1633–1703), English diarist, naval administrator, and Member of Parliament
- Samuel C. Polley (1864–1949), American lawyer, politician, and judge
- Samuel Hartt Pook (1827–1901), American naval architect
- Samuel Rabin (1905–1993), American lawyer and politician
- Samuel Rabin (artist) (1903–1991) English sculptor, artist, and Olympic bronze medal wrestler
- Samuel Rappaport (fl. 1971–1984), American politician from Pennsylvania
- Samuel Richardson (1689–1761), English writer and printer
- Samuel Rosa (musician) (born 1966), lead singer and guitarist of Brazilian rock band Skank
- Samuel Rothschild (1899–1987), Canadian ice hockey player
- Samuel "Sam" Sheppard (1923–1970), American neurosurgeon accused of killing his wife
- Samuel Sewall (1652–1730), Puritan judge, involved in Salem witch trials
- Samuel Sewall (congressman) (1757–1814), American congressman
- Samuel Serrano (born 1952), Puerto Rican former professional boxer
- Samuel Smedley, American ship captain and privateer during the American Revolutionary War
- Samuel A. Spiegel (1914–1977), American lawyer, politician, and judge
- Samuel B. Sterrett (1922–2013), judge of the United States Tax Court
- Samuel Stone (disambiguation), several people
- Samuel Tinsley (1847–1903), English chess player
- Samuel Tomeček (born 1986), Slovak singer
- Samuel Edwin Tsitsi (1925–1997), Nauruan politician
- Samuel Verzosa, Filipino businessman
- Samuel José da Silva Vieira, (born 1974) Brazilian footballer
- Samuel Wale, English historical painter and book illustrator
- Samuel Wilson (1766–1854), American meatpacker and source of Uncle Sam
- Samuel Winslow (1862–1940), American politician from Massachusetts
- Samuel Witwer (born 1977), American actor and musician
- Samuel Merrill Woodbridge (1819–1905), American clergyman, theologian, author, and professor
- Samuel van der Putte (1690–1745), Dutch explorer of Tibet
- Samuel Walton (1918–1992), American businessman, founder of Walmart
- Samuel White (disambiguation) multiple people including:
  - Samuel A. White (1823–1878), American politician
  - Samuel Albert White (1870–1954), Australian ornithologist
  - Samuel White (Massachusetts politician) (1710–1769), lawyer in the Province of Massachusetts Bay
  - Samuel White (Delaware politician) (1770–1809), lawyer and U.S. Senator from Delaware
- Samuel Womack (born 1999), American football player

=== Surname ===
==== A-C ====
- Abraham Samuel (died 1705), mulatto pirate of the Indian Ocean
- Adolphe Samuel (1824–1898), Belgian music critic, conductor and composer
- Adriana Samuel (born 1966), Brazilian volleyball player
- Albert Samuel (c. 1876–1963), New Zealand politician
- Alexander Lyle-Samuel (1883–1942), English businessman and politician
- Amado Samuel (born 1938), American baseball player
- Ananda Rao Samuel (1928–1999), Indian bishop
- Andy Samuel (1909–1992), American child actor
- Anthony Samuel, Cook Islander professional rugby league footballer
- António da Silva Samuel (born 1966 in Guinea-Bissau), Portuguese football player
- Arthur Samuel, 1st Baron Mancroft (1872–1942), British politician
- Arthur Samuel (computer scientist) (1901–1990), American computer scientist
- Asante Samuel (born 1981), American football player
- Asante Samuel Jr. (born 1999), American football player
- Basil Samuel (1912–1987), British founder of property company Great Portland Estates
- Benedict Samuel (born 1988), Australian actor, writer and director
- Bernard Samuel (1880–1954), American politician, mayor of Philadelphia
- Caroline Samuel (1822–1851), Belgian composer
- Charles Samuel (1862–1939), Belgian sculptor, engraver and medalist
- Charlesworth Samuel (died 2008), Antiguan politician
- Christmas Samuel (1674–1764), Welsh Independent minister and writer
- Christophe Samuel (born 1961), Malagasy politician
- Clifford Samuel, British actor
- Collin Samuel (born 1981), Trinidadian footballer
- Curtis Samuel (born 1996), American football player

==== D-I ====
- David Samuel (disambiguation)
- Deebo Samuel (born 1996), American football player
- Demetres Samuel (born 2008), American football player
- Eboule Bille Samuel (born 1982), Cameroonian football player
- Edmund W. Samuel (1857–1930), American politician
- Edwin Samuel, 2nd Viscount Samuel (1898–1978), British politician
- Ester Samuel-Cahn (1933–2015), Israeli statistician and educator
- Evelin Samuel (born 1975), Estonian singer, actress and writer
- Flora Samuel, British architect, author and academic
- Fred Samuel (1897–c.1941), Welsh rugby player
- Gene Samuel (born 1961), Trinidad and Tobago bicyclist
- Glyn Samuel (1917–1985), Welsh cricketer
- Graeme Samuel (born 1946), Australian businessman
- Haile Samuel (1952–2023), Eritrean major general
- Harold Samuel (1879–1937), English pianist and pedagogue
- Harold Samuel, Baron Samuel of Wych Cross (1912–1987), British businessman
- Harriet Samuel (1836–1908), English businesswoman
- Sir Harry Simon Samuel (1853–1934), English politician
- Heather Samuel (born 1970), retired sprinter from Antigua and Barbuda
- Herbert Samuel, 1st Viscount Samuel, (1870–1963), British politician and diplomat
- Howel Walter Samuel (1881–1953), British politician
- Ian Samuel (1915–2010), Royal Air Force pilot and diplomat

==== J-P ====
- James Samuel (1824–1874), British railway engineer
- Jamile Samuel (born 1992), Dutch sprinter
- Jlloyd Samuel (born 1981), Trinidadian footballer
- Joanne Samuel (born 1957), Australian actress
- John Samuel (rugby union) (1868–1947), Welsh rugby player
- John S. Samuel (1913–2002), U.S. Air Force general
- Jonathan Samuel (1852/3–1917), British manufacturer and politician
- Joseph Samuel (c. 1780–1806), English criminal who survived execution
- Juan Samuel (born 1960) Dominican-American baseball player
- Judy Samuel (born 1943), British swimmer
- Khari Samuel (born 1976), American football player
- Leighton Samuel, Welsh businessman, owner of football teams
- Lissy Samuel (born 1967), Indian cricketer
- Dame Louise Samuel (died 1925), English suffragist and charity worker
- Mar Samuel (1909–1995), Metropolitan and Archbishop of the Syriac Orthodox Church of Antioch
- Marcus Samuel (disambiguation)
- Marguerite Samuel (1847–1912), American composer and pianist
- Martin Samuel (born 1964), British journalist
- Maurice Samuel (1895–1972), Romanian-born British and American novelist
- Moran Samuel (born 1982), Israeli Paralympic basketball player and world champion rower
- Moses Samuel (1795–1860), British clockmaker, translator of Hebrew works
- Myron Samuel (born 1992), Vincentian footballer
- Oliver Samuel (1849–1925), New Zealand politician
- Pamela Richards Samuel (born 1959), U.S. Virgin Islander politician
- Peter Samuel, 4th Viscount Bearsted (1911–1996), British soldier and banker
- Pierre Samuel (1921–2009), French mathematician

==== R-X ====
- Randy Samuel (born 1963), Trinidadian-Canadian soccer player
- Raphael Samuel (1934–1996), British historian
- Reuben Samuel (1828–1908), stepfather of outlaws Frank and Jesse James
- Rhian Samuel (born 1944), Welsh composer
- Richard Samuel (fl.1770–1786), English portrait painter
- Richard Samuel (prefect) (born 1952), French prefect
- Robert Samuel (died 1555), English priest, one of the Ipswich Martyrs
- Samuel Samuel (1855–1934), British businessman and politician
- Sandra Samuel (born c. 1964), Indian nanny who saved the life of a two-year-old child during Mumbai terrorist attacks in 2008
- Sir Saul Samuel (1820–1900), Australian colonial merchant, politician and pastoralist
- Seal Henry Samuel (born 1963), British musician commonly known simply as Seal
- Shandel Samuel (born 1982), Vincentian footballer
- Sigmund Samuel (1868–1962), Canadian industrialist
- Silvio Samuel (born 1975), Nigerian professional bodybuilder
- Stanley Bernard Stephen Samuel (born 1986), Malaysian footballer
- Thangadurai Samuel, Indian classical guitarist
- Tony Samuel (born 1955), American football coach and player
- Walter Samuel, 2nd Viscount Bearsted, (1882–1948), British soldier, company chairman and art collector
- Walter Samuel (born 1978), Argentine footballer for Inter Milan
- Wolfgang W.E. Samuel (born 1935), German-born American author and veteran of the U.S. Air Force
- Xavier Samuel (born 1983), Australian actor

=== Fictional characters ===
- Samuel "Sammy" Fabelman, the main protagonist of Steven Spielberg's semi-autobiographical film The Fabelmans
- Samuel Gerard, supervisor of U.S. marshals in The Fugitive
- Samuel "Sam" Jones, protagonist of Fireman Sam
- Samuel Vimes, captain and, later, commander of the Ankh-Morpork City Watch in the Discworld series
- Samuel "Zammo" Maguire, a main character in Grange Hill
- Sam Eagle, Muppet character
- Samuel "Jetstream Sam" Rodrigues, a character and boss fight from Metal Gear Rising: Revengeance
- Samuel "Sam" Wilson, a major character in the Marvel Cinematic Universe
- Professor Samuel Oak, a recurring character in the Pokemon multimedia franchise.
- Sam Winchester, one of two main characters in the TV show Supernatural
- Uncle Sam, mascot of the United States of America

== See also ==
- Books of Samuel of the Bible
- Kamuela – Hawaiian equivalent of Samuel
- Samael – A similar name
- Samuela
- Shamil (disambiguation) – Arabic equivalent of Samuel
- Shmuel (disambiguation) – Hebrew equivalent of Samuel
