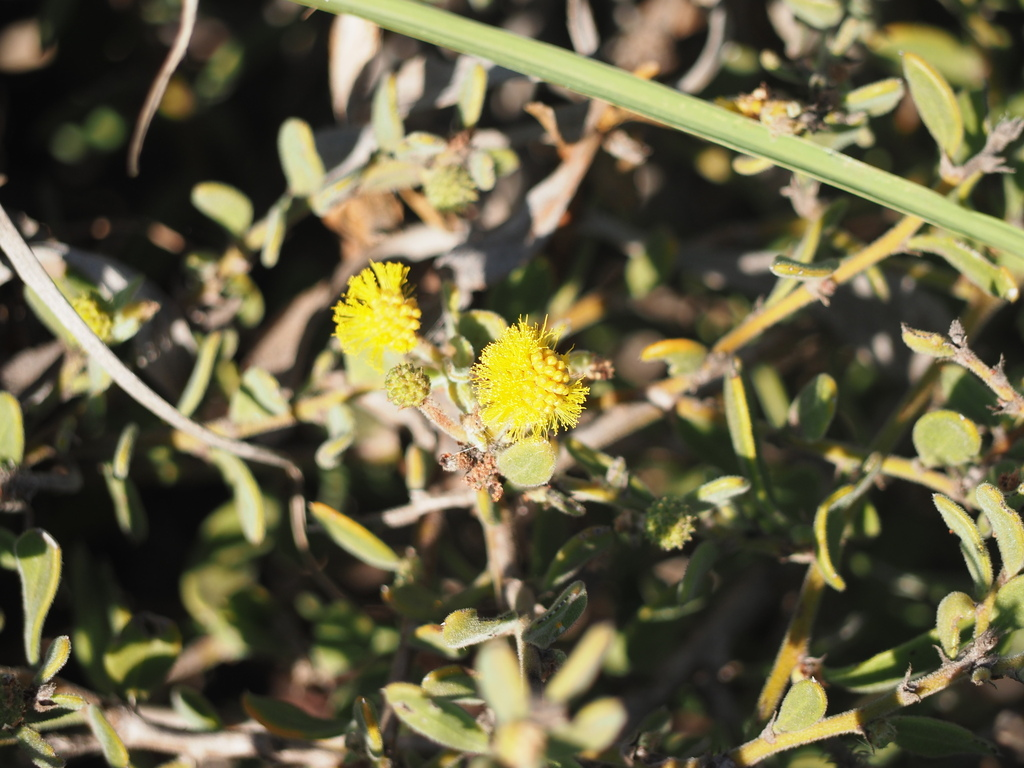
- On Thevenard Island

Scientific classification
- Kingdom: Plantae
- Clade: Tracheophytes
- Clade: Angiosperms
- Clade: Eudicots
- Clade: Rosids
- Order: Fabales
- Family: Fabaceae
- Subfamily: Caesalpinioideae
- Clade: Mimosoid clade
- Genus: Acacia
- Species: A. gregorii

Binomial name
- Acacia gregorii F.Muell.
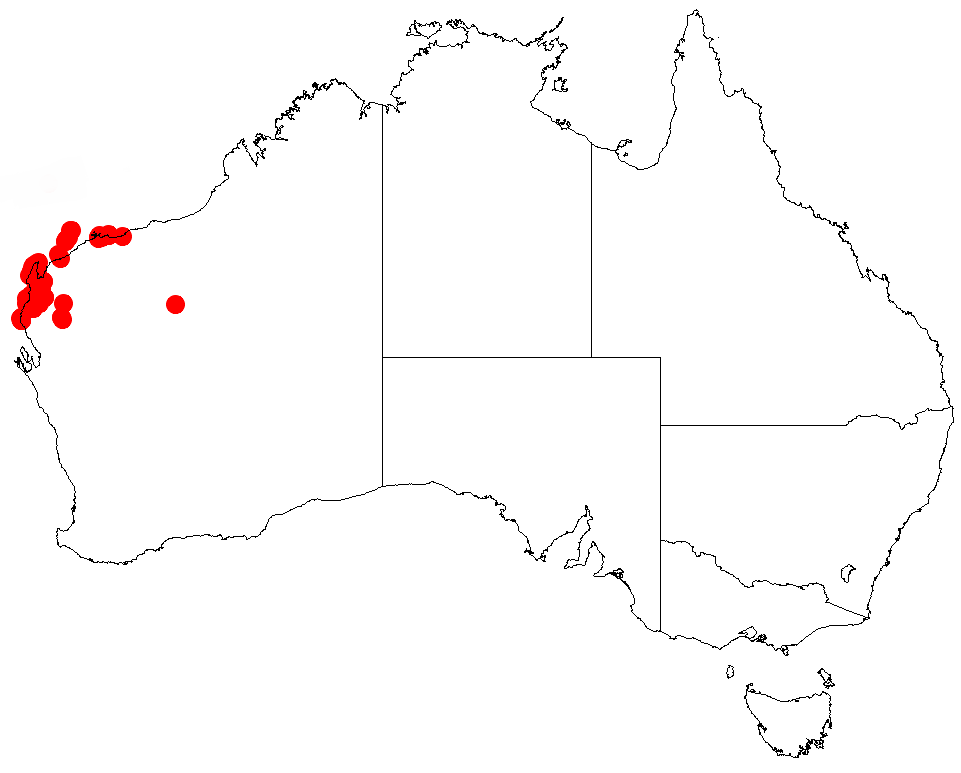
- Occurrence data from AVH

Synonyms
- Racosperma gregorii (F.Muell.) Pedley

= Acacia gregorii =

Gregory's wattle

Species of legume

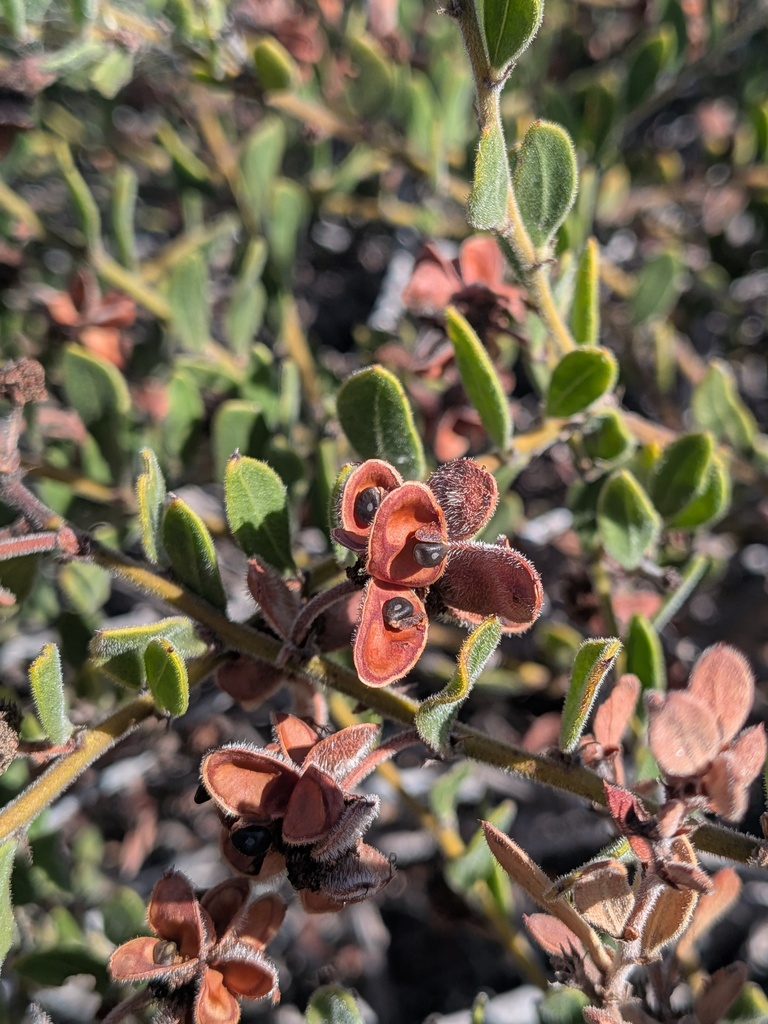
Open pods with seeds

Acacia gregorii, commonly known as Gregory's wattle, is a species of flowering plant in the family Fabaceae and is endemic to the north-west of Western Australia. It is a dense, prostrate or low spreading shrub with elliptic or egg-shaped phyllodes, sometimes with the narrower end towards the base, spherical or oblong heads of golden yellow flowers and crowded, oblong, thinly leathery to crusty pods with one or two seeds.

== Description ==
Acacia gregorii is a dense, prostrate or low-spreading shrub that typically grows to 0.5–1 m (1 ft 8 in – 3 ft 3 in) high and 2 m (6 ft 7 in) wide, its branchlets covered with soft hairs. Its phyllodes are elliptic to egg-shaped, sometimes with the narrower end towards the base, 10–20 mm (0.39–0.79 in) long, 5–10 mm (0.20–0.39 in) wide, more or less wavy with one vein on each side and a sometimes sharp point on the end. There are striated, triangular to egg-shaped stipules 1.5–3.5 mm (0.059–0.138 in) long and 1–2 mm (0.039–0.079 in) wide at the base of the phyllodes. The flowers are borne in a spherical or oblong head in axils on a peduncle 5–20 mm (0.20–0.79 in) long, the heads 7–8 mm (0.28–0.31 in) in diameter with 35 to 60 golden yellow flowers. Flowering occurs from June to August, and the pods are crowded, oblong, up to 18 mm (0.71 in) long and 4–5 mm (0.16–0.20 in) wide, thinly leathery to crust and hairy, usually with one or two seeds. The seeds are egg-shaped, slightly shiny dark brown with an aril 3 mm (0.12 in) long.

Gregory's wattle is similar in appearance to A. crispula and A. shuttleworthii which are both found further south. It also shares some affinities with Acacia crassistipula.

== Taxonomy ==
Acacia gregorii was first formally described in 1862 by the botanist Ferdinand von Mueller in his Fragmenta Phytographiae Australiae from specimens collected near the shores of Nickol Bay and in valleys of "Hearson Island" by Pemberton Wallcott. The specific epithet (gregorii) honours Francis Thomas Gregory whose expedition crossed the Pilbara in 1861.

== Distribution and habitat ==
Gregory's wattle grows in coastal sand or limestone on plains and rocky hills with spinifex or in heath between Quobba and north to near Wickham, including Barrow and Montebello Islands, with an outlier in the Kennedy Range National Park, in the Carnarvon, Gascoyne and Pilbara bioregions of north-western Western Australia.

== Conservation status ==
Acacia gregorii is listed as "not threatened" by the Government of Western Australia Department of Biodiversity, Conservation and Attractions.

== See also ==
- List of Acacia species
