= Shamel (disambiguation) =

Shamel is a Goan percussion instrument.

Shamel may also refer to:

- Shamel Jones, American collegiate basketball player and streetball player
- Frank Shamel (1912–1994), American basketball player
- H. Harold Shamel (1886–1963), American mammalogist
- Youssef Shamel (born 2006), Egyptian fencer

== See also ==
- Shamel Bazar, a village in Polan Rural District, Polan District, Chabahar County, Sistan and Baluchestan Province, Iran
- Shamil (disambiguation)
- Chamel, a given name and surname
