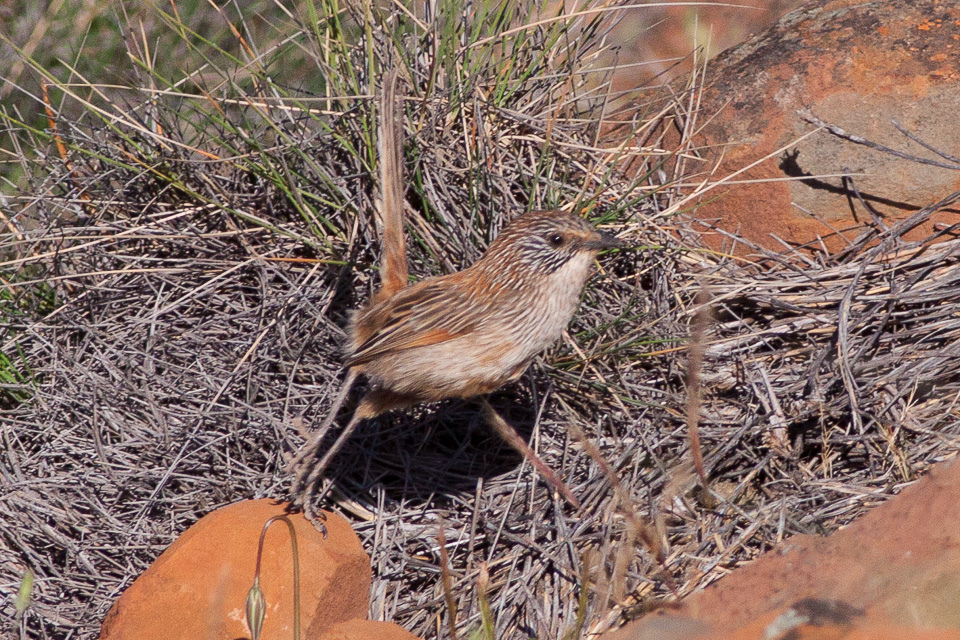

Conservation status
- Near Threatened (IUCN 3.1)

Scientific classification
- Kingdom: Animalia
- Phylum: Chordata
- Class: Aves
- Order: Passeriformes
- Family: Maluridae
- Genus: Amytornis
- Species: A. merrotsyi

Binomial name
- Amytornis merrotsyi Mellor, 1913

Subspecies
- See text

= Short-tailed grasswren =

Species of bird

The short-tailed grasswren (Amytornis merrotsyi) is a small passerine bird in the family Maluridae, commonly known as the Australasian wrens. It is endemic to Australia, where it has a highly restricted distribution in the arid interior of South Australia, particularly the Flinders and Gawler Ranges.

This species inhabits rocky hillsides and ranges dominated by spinifex (Triodia) grasses, typically within temperate shrubland and semi-arid environments. It is strongly associated with stony terrain and dense ground vegetation, which provide both shelter and foraging opportunities.

== Description ==
The short-tailed grasswren is a small, cryptic bird, measuring around 15–16 cm (5.9–6.3 in) in length, with predominantly brown, streaked plumage that provides effective camouflage against its arid surroundings. It is distinguished from related grasswrens by its relatively short tail, compact body, and subtle facial markings, including a darker mask-like pattern around the eyes.

== Behavior ==
The short-tailed grasswren (Amytornis merrotsyi) shows behavior typical of grasswrens but with some distinctive traits linked to its rocky, spinifex-dominated habitat.

It is primarily terrestrial and highly secretive, spending most of its time moving through dense ground vegetation rather than flying. When disturbed, it prefers to run or dart between clumps of spinifex instead of taking to the air, which makes it difficult to observe in the wild. Its flight, when used, is short and low.

The species is generally found in small social groups, usually consisting of a breeding pair and sometimes additional individuals, likely offspring from previous broods. These groups maintain territories and communicate using a series of soft calls and high-pitched songs, often delivered from low perches such as shrubs or rocks.

In terms of feeding behavior, the short-tailed grasswren is an opportunistic ground forager, probing and picking through leaf litter and soil for insects, spiders, and small invertebrates, as well as seeds. It relies heavily on dense vegetation for both food and protection from predators.

Breeding behavior is cooperative or pair-based, with nests typically built close to the ground and well concealed within spinifex or shrub cover. The nest is a domed structure with a side entrance, made from grasses and plant fibers. Both parents may contribute to feeding the young, and breeding activity is often timed to follow rainfall, when food resources are more abundant.

== Subspecies ==
Two subspecies are recognized:

- A. m. merrotsyi – Mellor, 1913: found on Flinders Ranges, South Australia
- A. m. pedleri – Christidis, Horton & Norman, 2008: found on Gawler Ranges, South Australia
