= Shmuel =

Shmuel or Schmuel is the Modern Hebrew form of the name Samuel. Shmuel and variations may refer to:

- Samuel (Bible), the Hebrew Bible prophet
- Books of Samuel, the book of the Tanach
- Shmuel Hakatan, the Tanna (Mishnaic sage)
- Samuel of Nehardea, the Amora (Talmudic sage)

== Given name ==
- Shmuel Ben David (1884–1927), illustrator, painter, typographer and designer
- Shmuel Ben-Dror (1924–2009), Israeli footballer
- Shmuel Ben Eliezer (born 1981), American record executive
- Shmuel Bornsztain (second Sochatchover rebbe), (1856–1926), author of Shem Mishmuel
- Shmuel Bornsztain (sixth Sochatchover rebbe), (born 1961), Israeli rabbi
- Leonard Chess (born Lejzor Szmuel Czyż; 1917–1969), Polish-born American record company executive
- Shmuel Dayan (1891–1968), Israeli politician
- Shmuel Ehrenfeld (1891–1980), rabbi
- Shmuel Flatto-Sharon (1930–2018), French-Israeli businessman, radio talk-show host and politician
- Samuel Goldwyn (born Szmuel Gelbfisz; 1882–1974), Polish-American film producer
- Shmuel Greenberg (born 1975), Israeli politician
- Szmul Hirsz Peltyn (1831–1896), Polish Jewish writer, translator, and publisher
- Samuel Giamil (1847–1917), Assyrian scholar and author
- Shmuel Kamenetsky (born 1924), American Haredi rabbi
- Shmuel Kaminetsky (born 1965), chief rabbi of Dnipro and Dnipropetrovsk Oblast
- Shmuel Kozokin (born 1987), Israeli footballer
- Shmuel Malika-Aharon (1947–2011), Israeli footballer
- Shmuel Onn (born 1960), professor at Technion - Israel Institute of Technology
- Shmuel Pinchasi, rabbi
- Sam Pivnik (born Szmuel Pivnik; 1926–2017), Holocaust survivor, author
- Shmuel Rabinovitch (born 1970), Orthodox rabbi
- Shmuel Rodensky (1902–1989), Israeli actor
- Szmulek Rozental (Stephan Ross, 1931–2020), Polish-American holocaust survivor
- Samuel Reshevsky (born Szmul Rzeszewski; 1911–1992), Polish American chess player
- Shmuel Schneersohn (1834–1882), Orthodox rabbi
- Shmuel Yosef Agnon (1888–1970), Nobel Prize laureate writer
- Sam Warner (born Szmuel Wonsal; 1887–1927), American film producer
- Shmuel Winograd (1936–2019), Israeli-American computer scientist
- Shmuel Wolf (1934–2019), Israeli actor
- Shmuel Zaks (born 1949), computer scientist and mathematician
- Sam Zell (born Shmuel Zielonka; 1941–2023), American billionaire businessman and philanthropist
- Szmul Zygielbojm (1895–1943), Polish Jewish socialist politician
- Shmuel Zytomirski (1900–1944), figure of the Jewish community of Lublin

== Surname ==
- Ya'acov Shmuel (born 1968), Israeli Olympic boxer

== Fictional characters ==
- Shmuel, a character in The Boy in the Striped Pajamas (novel) and The Boy in the Striped Pyjamas (film)
- Shmuel, a character in the television series The Chosen

== See also ==
- Shmueli (disambiguation)
