= Chamel =

Chamel is a masculine given name and surname of Arabic origin. Notable people with the name include:

== Given name ==
- Chamel Roukoz (born 1958), Lebanese Army brigadier general

== See also ==
- Lel Chamel, a 2010 Tunisian film directed by Youssef Chebbi.
- Shamel
- Shamil (disambiguation)
