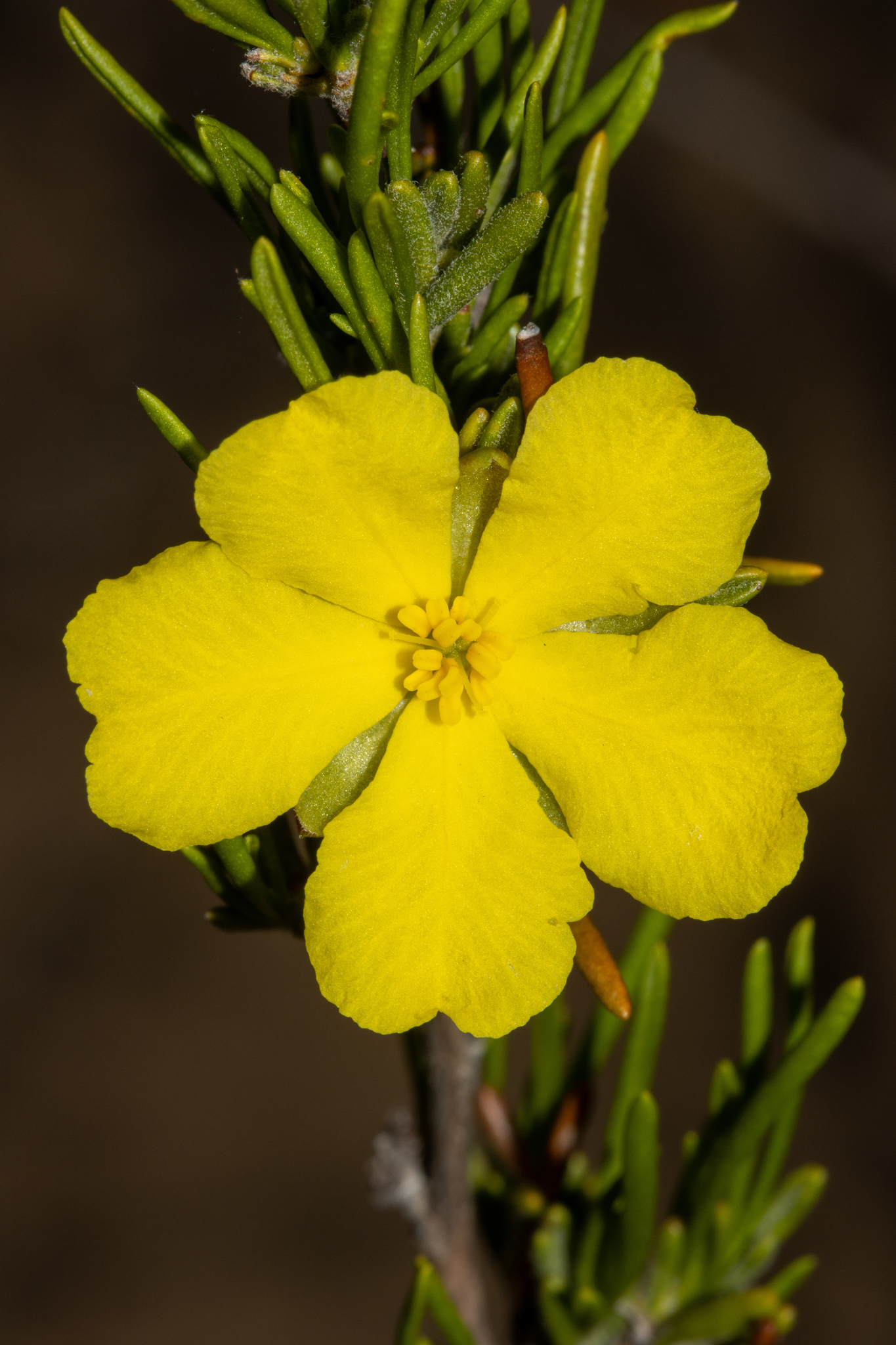

Conservation status
- Vulnerable (EPBC Act)

Scientific classification
- Kingdom: Plantae
- Clade: Tracheophytes
- Clade: Angiosperms
- Clade: Eudicots
- Order: Dilleniales
- Family: Dilleniaceae
- Genus: Hibbertia
- Species: H. crispula

Binomial name
- Hibbertia crispula J.M.Black

= Hibbertia crispula =

Ooldea guinea flower

Species of flowering plant

Hibbertia crispula, commonly known as Ooldea guinea flower, is a species of flowering plant in the family Dilleniaceae and is native to disjunct locations in Western Australia and South Australia. It is a small, wiry, glabrous shrub with needle-shaped leaves and yellow flowers with twenty-five to thirty-five stamens arranged around three glabrous carpels.

== Description ==
Hibbertia crispula is a wiry, glabrous shrub that typically grows to a height of 50 cm (20 in). The leaves are needle-shaped, sometimes arranged in clusters, up to 45 mm (1.8 in) long and 1 mm (0.039 in) wide with a furrow along the lower surface. The flowers are arranged in leaf axils and are about 8–15 mm (0.31–0.59 in) wide with about five small bracts at the base. The sepals are 5–7 mm (0.20–0.28 in) long and the petals are yellow, more or less round with a notch at the tip and up to twice as long as the sepals. There are twenty-five to thirty-five stamens arranged around the three glabrous carpels, each containing four or five ovules.

== Taxonomy ==
Hibbertia crispula was first formally described in 1917 by John McConnell Black in the Transactions and Proceedings of the Royal Society of South Australia from specimens collected by Samuel Albert White near Ooldea in the same year. The specific epithet (crispula) means "curled" or "crinkled".

== Distribution ==
Ooldea guinea flower is only known from near Ooldea and near Yellabinna Regional Reserve in South Australia and from the Great Victoria Desert in Western Australia.

== Conservation status ==
Hibbertia crispula is classified as "vulnerable" under the Australian Government Environment Protection and Biodiversity Conservation Act 1999 and as "Priority One" by the Government of Western Australia Department of Parks and Wildlife, meaning that it is known from only one or a few locations which are potentially at risk. The main threats to the species include weed invasion, grazing by feral animals and habitat fragmentation.

== See also ==
- List of Hibbertia species
