= Izraelita =

Izraelita was a Polish Jewish weekly journal published in Warsaw from 1866 to 1915, founded by Jewish reformers. The journal's primary audience was the Polonized Jewish elite and a few Poles, but its circulation remained under 500 copies. It was seen as an unsuccessful tool for Polonization by the Polish, often criticized for its support of a separate Jewish education system.

Founded by Szmul Hirsz Peltyn, Izraelita promoted the Polish language and culture, supported religious reform and modern Jewish education, and opposed the use of Yiddish. Despite opposing secular nationalism and religious traditionalism, the journal affirmed Jewish religious identity and resisted antisemitism. Under subsequent editor Nahum Sokolow, the journal expressed Jewish national ideas, especially Zionism. Later editors returned it to its original Polish patriotic and integrationist rhetoric.

Initially dedicated to studying Judaism, It expanded to cover religious, educational, scientific, social, and literary topics. The journal provides a unique perspective on Jewish modernization during a critical period in Polish Jewish history marked by rising nationalism and antisemitism. Despite its assimilationist image, Izraelita represented a wide ideological spectrum. It played a significant role in Polish culture, literature, and science, introducing the first works on Jewish themes and fostering an intellectual environment that nurtured Polish Jewish literature.
