= Samuela =

Samuela is a given name. Notable people with the name include:

- Samuela Anise (born 1986), a Japanese rugby union footballer
- Samuela Bola (born 1983), a Fijian rugby union footballer
- Samuela Davetawalu, a Fijian rugby league footballer
- Samuela Drudru (born 1989), a Fijian association (soccer) footballer
- Samuela Leuii (born 1972), a Samoan boxer
- Samuela Kautoga (born 1987), a Fijian association (soccer) footballer
- Samuela Marayawa, a Fijian rugby league footballer
- Samuela Matakibau, a Fijian former police officer
- Samuela Nabenia (born 1995), a Fijian association (soccer) footballer
- Samuela Tupou (born 1955), a Fijian swimmer
- Samuela Tuikiligana (born 1958), a Fijian international lawn bowler
- Samuela Valelala, a Fijian rugby league footballer
- Samuela Vula (born 1984), a Fijian association (soccer) footballer
- Samuela Vunisa (born 1988), an Italian rugby union footballer
- Samuela Vunivalu (born circa 1957), a Fijian politician
- Samuela Yavala (born 1947), a Fijian sprinter

== See also ==
- Samuel (name)
- Samiuela
- Yucca, botanical synonym of genus Samuela
