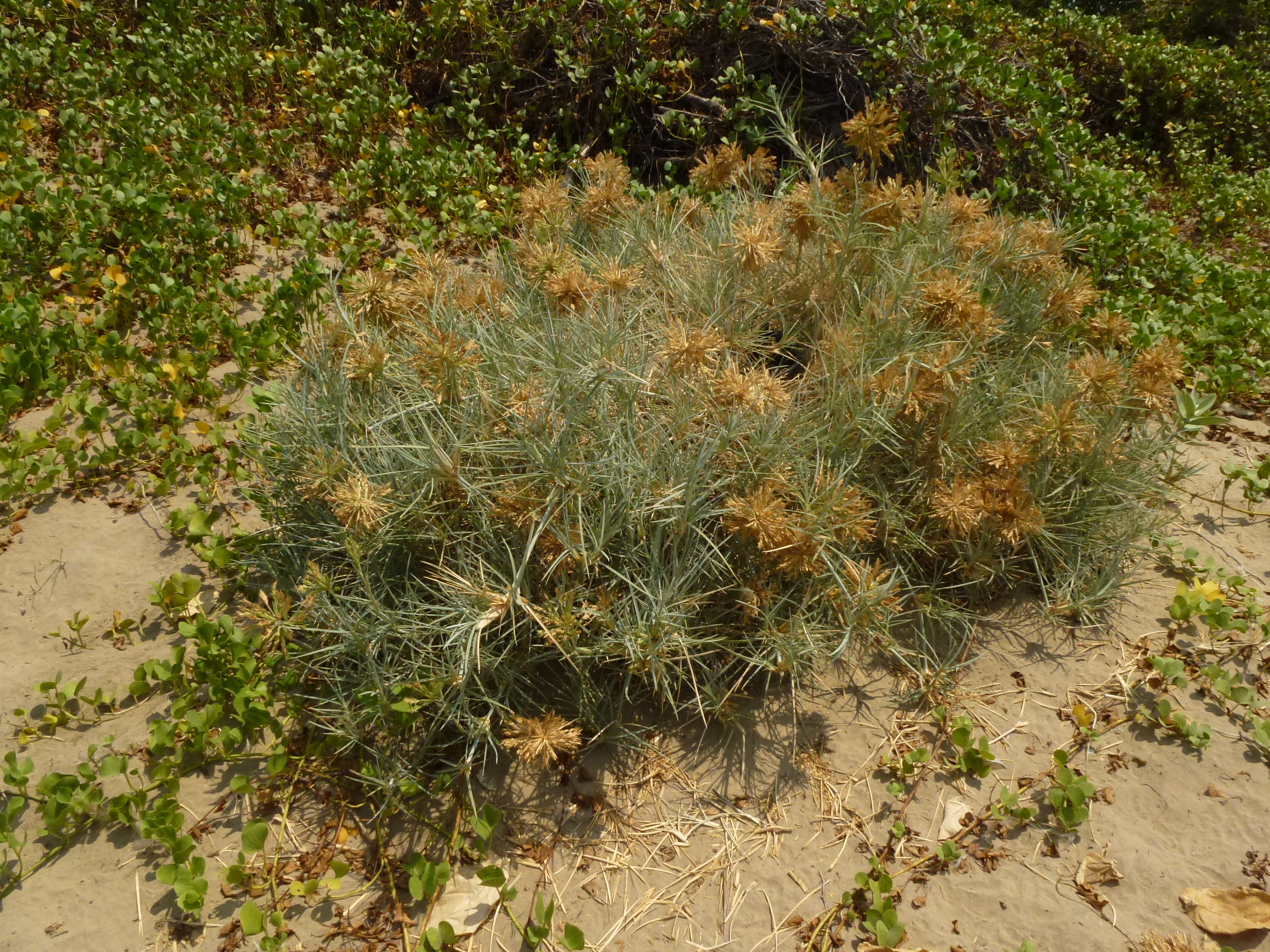

Scientific classification
- Kingdom: Plantae
- Clade: Tracheophytes
- Clade: Angiosperms
- Clade: Monocots
- Clade: Commelinids
- Order: Poales
- Family: Poaceae
- Subfamily: Panicoideae
- Genus: Spinifex
- Species: S. littoreus

Binomial name
- Spinifex littoreus (Burm.f.) Merr.

Synonyms
- Spinifex dioicus Buch.-Ham. ex Dillwyn; Spinifex elegans Buse; Spinifex squarrosus L.; Stipa littorea Burm.f.; Stipa spinifex L.

= Spinifex littoreus =

Species of herb

Spinifex littoreus is a species of flowering plant in the grass family Poaceae. The species is similar to Spinifex longifolius. It is native to tropical and subtropical areas of Asia and Australia.

The species is dioecious. It has been suggested that the species might give a significant model for studying the regulation as well as the evolutionary history of C4 and CAM photosynthesis.

== Occurrence ==
The species is native to Bangladesh, Cambodia, China, India, Japan, Malaysia, Maldives, Indonesia, Myanmar, Papua New Guinea, Philippines, Sri Lanka, Taiwan, Thailand, Vietnam, and Australia.
