= Sam White =

Sam or Sammy White may refer to:

- Sam White (baseball) (1893–1929), American baseball player
- Sam White (film producer) (1906–2006), American film producer
- Sam White (footballer) (1903/1904 – after 1929), English footballer
- Sam White (foreign correspondent) (1913–1988), British journalist
- Sam White (political adviser) (born 1975/1976), British political adviser
- Sammy White (actor) (1894–1960), American actor and comedian
- Sammy White (American football) (born 1954), American football wide receiver
- Sammy White (baseball) (1927–1991), American baseball player
- Clayton Sam White (1912–2004), American physician and brother of associate justice Byron White

== See also ==
- Samuel White (disambiguation)
