= Samuel White =

Samuel White may refer to:

- J. Samuel White, British shipbuilding firm
- Samuel A. White (1823–1878), American politician in Wisconsin
- Samuel Albert White (1870–1954), Australian ornithologist
- Samuel R. White, businessman after whom White Place Historic District (Illinois) was named
- Samuel White (Irish politician) (died 1854), Member of Parliament for Leitrim
- Samuel White (Massachusetts politician) (1710–1769), lawyer in the Province of Massachusetts Bay
- Samuel White (Delaware politician) (1770–1809), lawyer and U.S. senator from Delaware
- Samuel White (ornithologist) (1835–1880), British/South Australian ornithologist, father of Samuel Albert White
- Samuel White (basketball) (born 1987), Australian wheelchair basketballer

== See also ==
- Sam White (disambiguation)
