= Samuel Martin =

Samuel or Sam Martin may refer to:

- Samuel Martin (planter) (1694–1776), planter and politician in Antigua
- Samuel Martin (Camelford MP) (1714–1788), British politician and administrator
- Sir Samuel Martin (Pontefract MP) (1801–1883), Anglo-Irish politician and judge
- Samuel Martin (writer) (1810–1848), New Zealand land claimant, magistrate, journalist and writer
- Samuel Martin (entrepreneur) (born 1984), British entrepreneur
- Samuel Martin (missionary), American Presbyterian missionary
- Samuel E. Martin (1924–2009), linguist (Korean and Japanese) and designer of the Yale Romanization for Korean
- Samuel Soler Martín (born 1979), Paralympic swimmer from Spain
- Sam Martin (singer) (born 1983), American singer and songwriter
- Sam Martin (speedway rider) (born 1989), Australian speedway rider
- Sam Martin (American football) (born 1990), American football player
- Sam Martin, lead singer of the band Youngblood Hawke
- Samuel Martin (runner) (born 1906), American middle-distance runner, 3rd in the 880 yards at the 1929 USA Outdoor Track and Field Championships

== See also ==
- Sammy Martin (born 1965), American football player
