= Shamil =

Shamil (Arabic: شَامِل shāmil) is a relatively uncommon Arabic man's name.

The name is usually from the adjective which has several correlated meanings from the Arabic "complete, comprehensive, universal" but could also mean "embodying, profound". The adjective stems from the Arabic verb shamila (Arabic: شَمِلَ shamila) meaning "to comprehend, include, everything" but which is linked to other meanings:

1) "union, unity, correlation, bond"
2) "universal, predominant, embrace"

The feminine form of the name is Shamila (Arabic: شَامِلَة shāmilah).

Shamil may refer to:

== Places ==
- Shamil, Hormozgan, a village in Hormozgan Province, Iran
- Shamil-e Bala, a village in Hormozgan Province, Iran
- Shamil Rural District, a rural district in Hormozgan Province, Iran

== People ==
- Shamil, 3rd Imam of Dagestan (1797–1871), leader of resistance to Russian rule over the Caucasus
- Shamil Abbyasov (born 1957), Soviet Kyrgyzstani long jumper and triple jumper
- Shamil Asgarov (1929–2005), Azeri scholar
- Shamil Asildarov (born 1983), Russian footballer
- Shamil Basayev (1969–2006), militant Islamist and a leader of the Chechen rebel movement
- Shamil Borchashvili (born 1995), Austrian judoka
- Shamil Isayev (1964–2019), Russian footballer
- Shamil Khan (born 1978), Pakistani film actor
- Shamil Lakhiyalov (born 1979), Russian footballer
- Shamil Saidov (born 1982), Russian footballer
- Shamil Sabirov (born 1959), Soviet Olympic champion light flyweight boxer
- Shamil Serikov (1956–1989), Soviet Olympic champion wrestler
- Shamil Shetekauri (born 1955), Georgian scientist
- Shamil Zavurov (born 1984), Russian mixed martial arts fighter

== See also ==
- Samuel (name)
- Shamil Bank of Bahrain
- Shamel (disambiguation)
