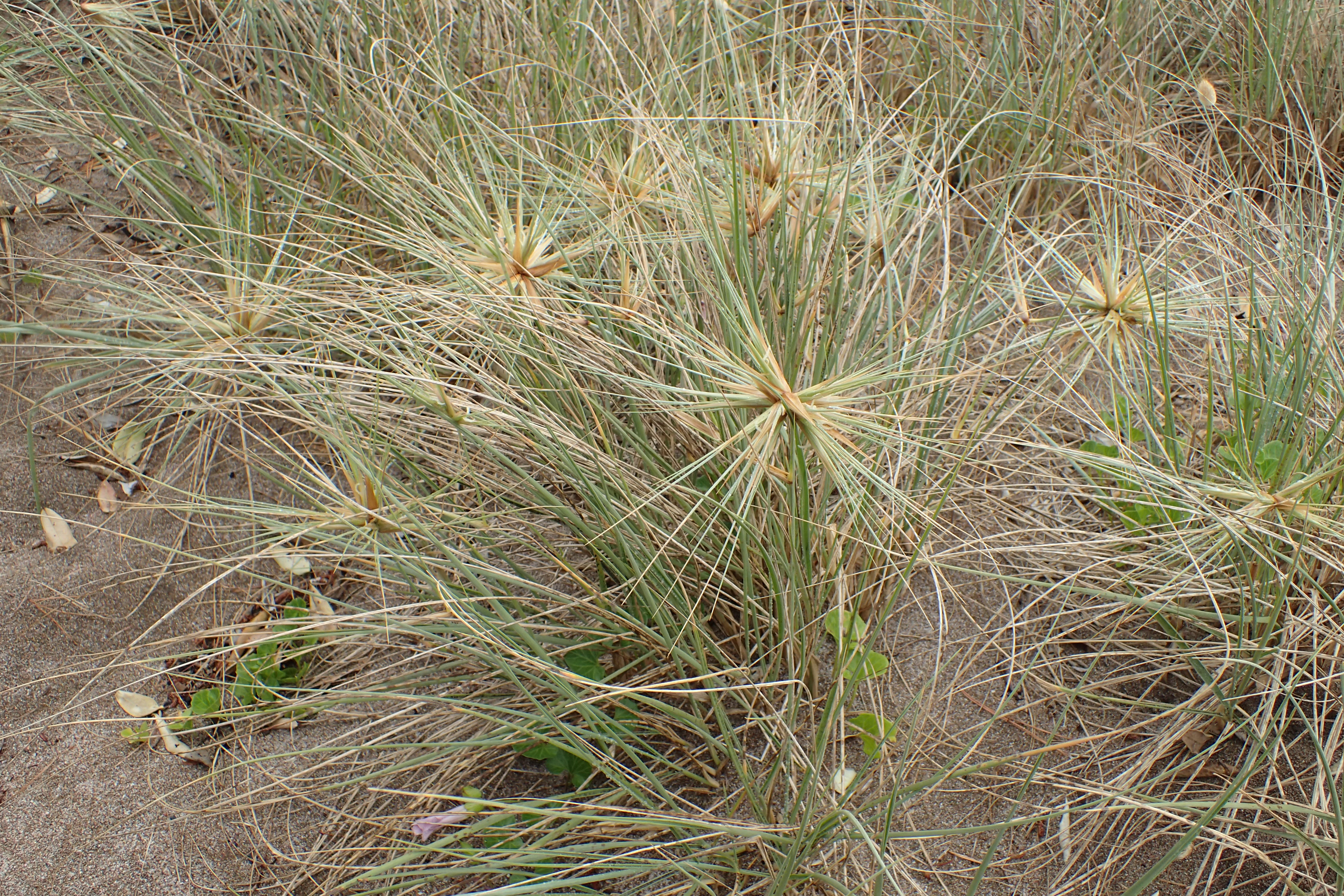

Scientific classification
- Kingdom: Plantae
- Clade: Tracheophytes
- Clade: Angiosperms
- Clade: Monocots
- Clade: Commelinids
- Order: Poales
- Family: Poaceae
- Subfamily: Panicoideae
- Genus: Spinifex
- Species: S. sericeus

Binomial name
- Spinifex sericeus R.Br.

Synonyms
- Spinifex hirsutus auct. non Labill.

= Spinifex sericeus =

Species of grass

Spinifex sericeus, commonly known as hairy spinifex, rolling spinifex, beach spinifex or coastal spinifex, is a dioecious perennial grass.

It is native to Australia, New Zealand, New Caledonia, and Tonga.

It is an important pioneer species which colonises coastal dunes, binding loose sand with its horizontal runners.

The 1889 book The Useful Native Plants of Australia records that common names included "Spring Rolling Grass" and that it "has no claim whatever as a food plant for stock, and can only be recommended as a sand-binder in fixing drift sands when encroaching on valuable land. For this purpose it deserves more attention than has hitherto been bestowed upon it. It is a plant of comparatively rapid growth, and would give effectual aid in checking the inroads of wind-driven sand, conditionally that the plants be carefully conserved from fire."

== Description ==
Spinifex sericeus has branched stolons and rhizomes extending up to 1–2 metres (3.3–6.6 ft). The leaves have a ligule of a rim of dense hairs; the blades are flat and densely silky.

The male inflorescence is an orange-brown terminal cluster of spiky racemes subtended by silky bracts. The female inflorescence detaches at maturity, a globose seed head of sessile racemes up to 20 cm in diameter which becomes a tumbleweed.
