= Jang Gil-hyeok =

South Korean footballer (born 1987)

Personal information
- Date of birth: May 30, 1987 (age 39)
- Place of birth: South Korea
- Height: 1.75 m (5 ft 9 in)
- Position: Right back

Senior career*
Years	Team	Apps	(Gls)
2010	Royal Thai Navy		
2011	Bangkok United		
2012	Ratchaburi		
2012	Bangkok United		
2013–2014	Ratchaburi	34	(0)
- * Club domestic league appearances and goals

- Jang Gil-hyeok
- Hangul: 장길혁
- RR: Jang Gilhyeok
- MR: Chang Kirhyŏk

Jang Gil-hyeok (born May 30, 1987) is a South Korean football player.
