= Samiuela =

Samiuela is a given name. Notable people with the name include:

- Samiuela Lousi (born 1991), a New Zealand rugby footballer
- Samiuela Tevi (born 1994), an American football offensive tackle
- Samiuela ʻAkilisi Pōhiva (1941–2019), former Prime Minister of Tonga

== See also ==
- Samuela
