= Shamel Jones =

American basketball and streetball player

Shamel Jones is an American former collegiate basketball player and streetball player. Jones skipped over St John's University, UNLV, and TCU to play for Georgetown. Jones originally played for the 1996–97 Georgetown Hoyas men's basketball team and later the University of Memphis. He took Memphis to the NIT championships during his time there. The 6'9 forward originally played for Paul Robeson HS along with Lamar Odom. He was considered to be a city Basketball legend. He played basketball in Brazil for Winner/Kabum Limeira. He teamed with James Speedy Williams in streetball tournaments in New York City.
