= Acacia shuttleworthii =

- Foliage and fruiting capsules

Scientific classification
- Kingdom: Plantae
- Clade: Tracheophytes
- Clade: Angiosperms
- Clade: Eudicots
- Clade: Rosids
- Order: Fabales
- Family: Fabaceae
- Subfamily: Caesalpinioideae
- Clade: Mimosoid clade
- Genus: Acacia
- Species: A. shuttleworthii

Binomial name
- Acacia shuttleworthii Meisn.
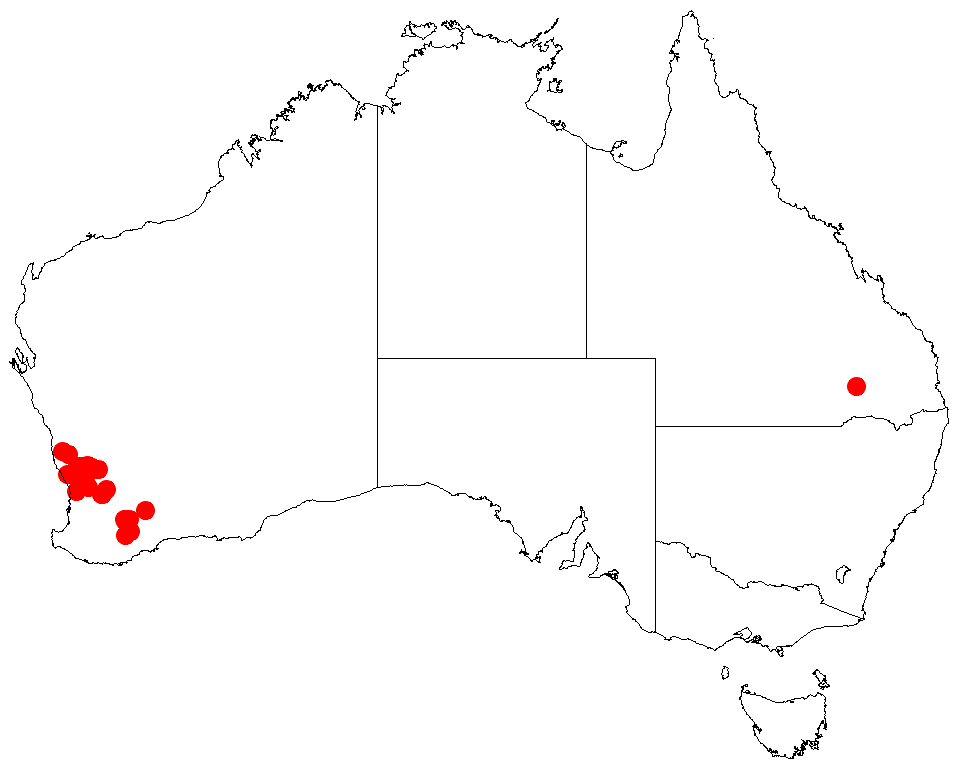
- Occurrence data from AVH

Species of legume

Habit in Kings Park

Acacia shuttleworthii is a shrub of the genus Acacia and the subgenus Phyllodineae that is endemic to western Australia.

== Description ==
The low compact shrub typically grows to a height of 0.25 to 0.5 metres (0.8 to 1.6 ft). It has finely ribbed, green coloured branchlets that are quite hairy with persistent stipules that have a linear-triangular shape and are 1 to 3 mm (0.039 to 0.118 in) in length. Like most species of Acacia it has phyllodes rather than true leaves. The oblique, ovate to elliptic or circular shaped phyllodes have a length of 5 to 16 mm (0.20 to 0.63 in) and a width of 3 to 11 mm (0.12 to 0.43 in) and are also covered in hairs and sometimes have two or three imperfect nerves on each face. It blooms from October to December and produces cream-white flowers.

== Taxonomy ==
The species was first formally described by the botanist Carl Meissner in 1844 as a part of Johann Georg Christian Lehmanns work Plantae Preissianae. It was reclassified as Racosperma shuttleworthii in 2003 by Leslie Pedley then transferred back to genus Acacia in 2006.

== Distribution ==
It is native to an area in the Wheatbelt region of Western Australia where it is found on hills and breakaways growing in lateritic soils. It has a disjunct distribution from around Dandaragan in the north to around Gnowangerup in the south growing in gravelly clay and sandy soils as a part of Eucalyptus wandoo woodland communities.

== See also ==
- List of Acacia species
