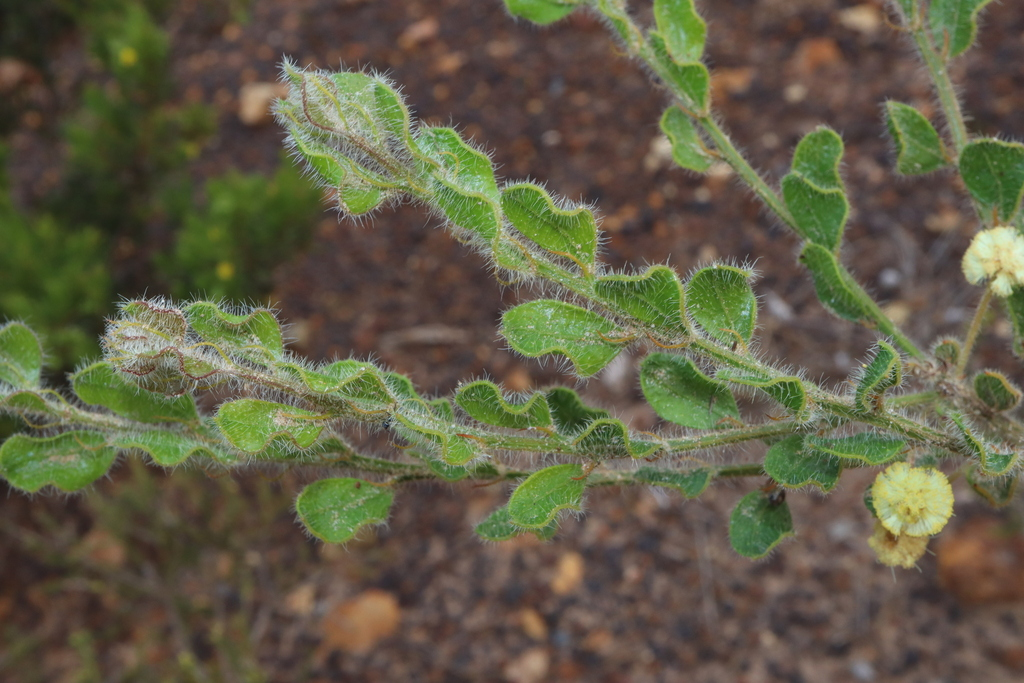
- Near Cape Riche

Scientific classification
- Kingdom: Plantae
- Clade: Tracheophytes
- Clade: Angiosperms
- Clade: Eudicots
- Clade: Rosids
- Order: Fabales
- Family: Fabaceae
- Subfamily: Caesalpinioideae
- Clade: Mimosoid clade
- Genus: Acacia
- Species: A. crispula

Binomial name
- Acacia crispula Benth.
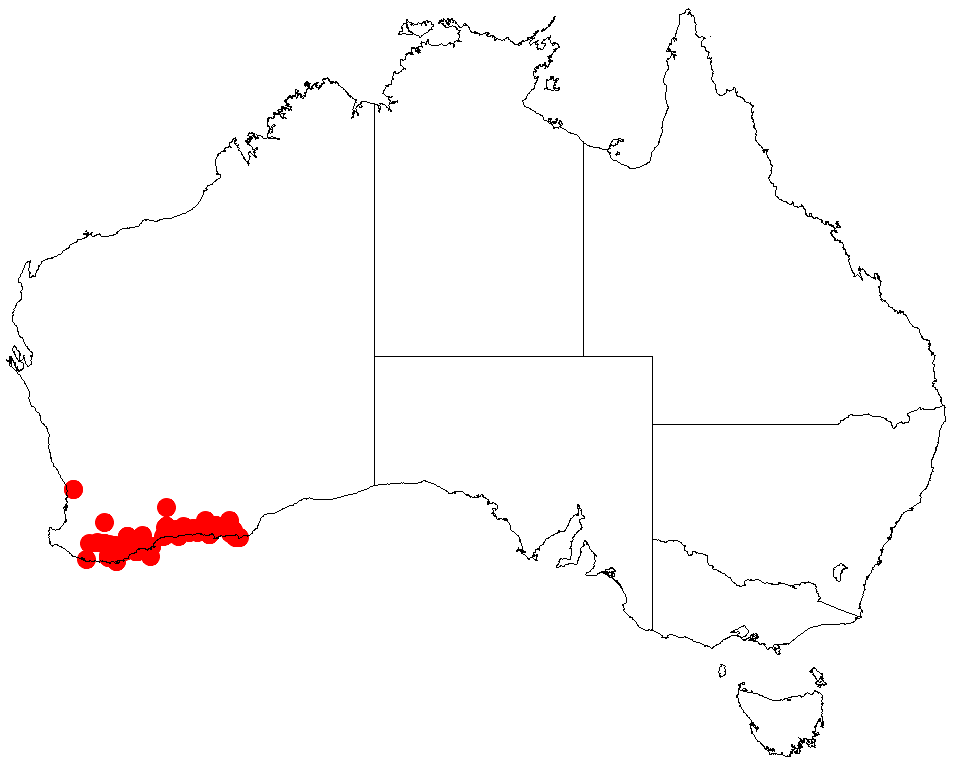
- Occurrence data from AVH

Synonyms
- Acacia pilosa Benth.; Racosperma crispulum (Benth.) Pedley

= Acacia crispula =

Species of legume

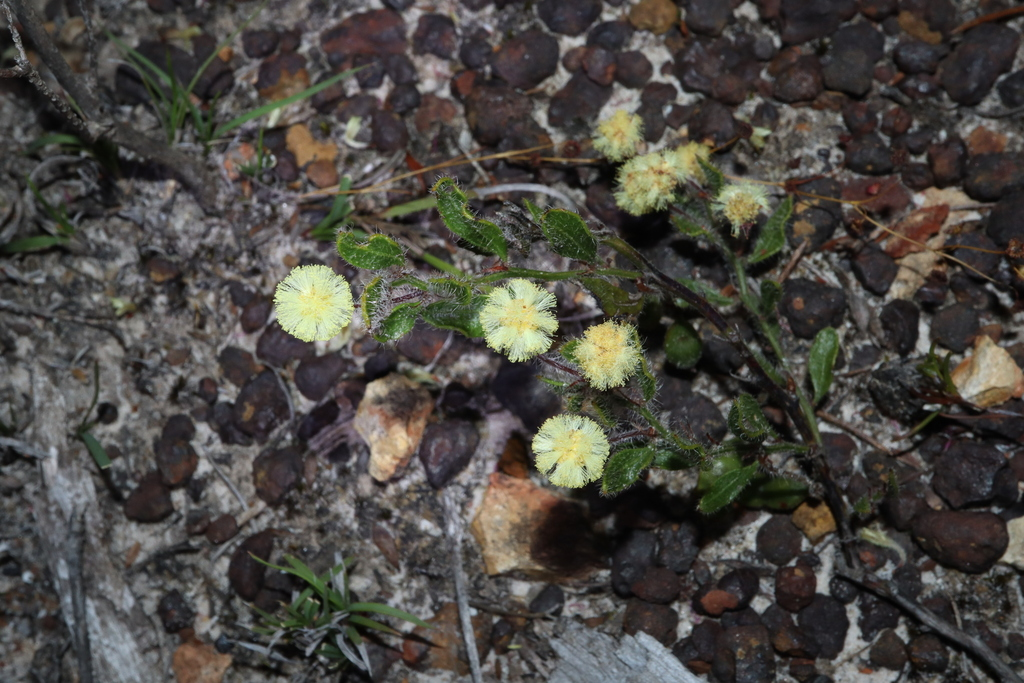
Habit near Bremer Bay

Acacia crispula is a species of flowering plant in the family Fabaceae and is endemic to the south of Western Australia. It is a multi-stemmed, prostrate or low-spreading shrub with hairy branchlets, hairy elliptic or narrowly elliptic to more or less lance-shaped phyllodes with wavy edges, spherical heads of pale yellow flowers and narrowly oblong, straight to curved, crusty to leathery pods.

== Description ==
Acacia crispula is a multi-stemmed, prostrate or low-spreading shrub that typically grows to a height of 30 cm (12 in) and 0.3–1.5 m (1 ft 0 in – 4 ft 11 in) wide and has branchlets are covered with soft, minute hairs. The phyllodes are elliptic or narrowly elliptic to more or less lance-shaped, 10–30 mm (0.39–1.18 in) long and 2–12 mm (0.079–0.472 in) wide and covered with hairs similar to those on the branchlets. There are persistent, more or less linear stipules 2–6 mm (0.079–0.236 in) long at the base of the phyllodes. The flowers are borne in one or two spherical heads in axils on peduncles usually 10–25 mm (0.39–0.98 in) long, the heads 4.0–4.5 mm (0.16–0.18 in) long with 10 to 20 pale yellow flowers. Flowering occurs from September to December, and the pods are narrowly oblong, straight or curved, 10–40 mm (0.39–1.57 in) long and 5–7 mm (0.20–0.28 in) wide and crusty to leathery. The seeds are oblong to elliptic, 3.0–3.5 mm (0.12–0.14 in) long and shiny black.

== Taxonomy ==
Acacia crispula was first formally described in 1855 by George Bentham in the journal Linnaea: Ein Journal für die Botanik in ihrem ganzen Umfange, oder Beiträge zur Pflanzenkunde. The specific epithet (crispula) means 'little-curled' or 'little crinkled', referring to the edges of the phyllodes.

== Distribution ==
This species of wattle is found from near Cranbrook to Cape Arid National Park with one collection near Wagin, in the Avon Wheatbelt, Esperance Plains, Jarrah Forest, Mallee and Warren bioregions of southern Western Australia, where it grows in sandy, clay, loamy and gravelly soils. It is usually found in mallee shrubland, but also in heath, low scrub and open wandoo woodlands.

== See also ==
- List of Acacia species
