= Samberg =

Samberg is a surname. Notable people with the surname include:

- Andy Samberg (born 1978), American actor, filmmaker, musician, and comedian
- Arthur J. Samberg (1941–2020), American businessman
- Avishag Samberg (born 2001), Israeli Olympic taekwondo bronze medalist
- Dylan Samberg (born 1999), American ice hockey player
