= Acacia crassistipula =

Scientific classification
- Kingdom: Plantae
- Clade: Tracheophytes
- Clade: Angiosperms
- Clade: Eudicots
- Clade: Rosids
- Order: Fabales
- Family: Fabaceae
- Subfamily: Caesalpinioideae
- Clade: Mimosoid clade
- Genus: Acacia
- Species: A. crassistipula

Binomial name
- Acacia crassistipula Benth.
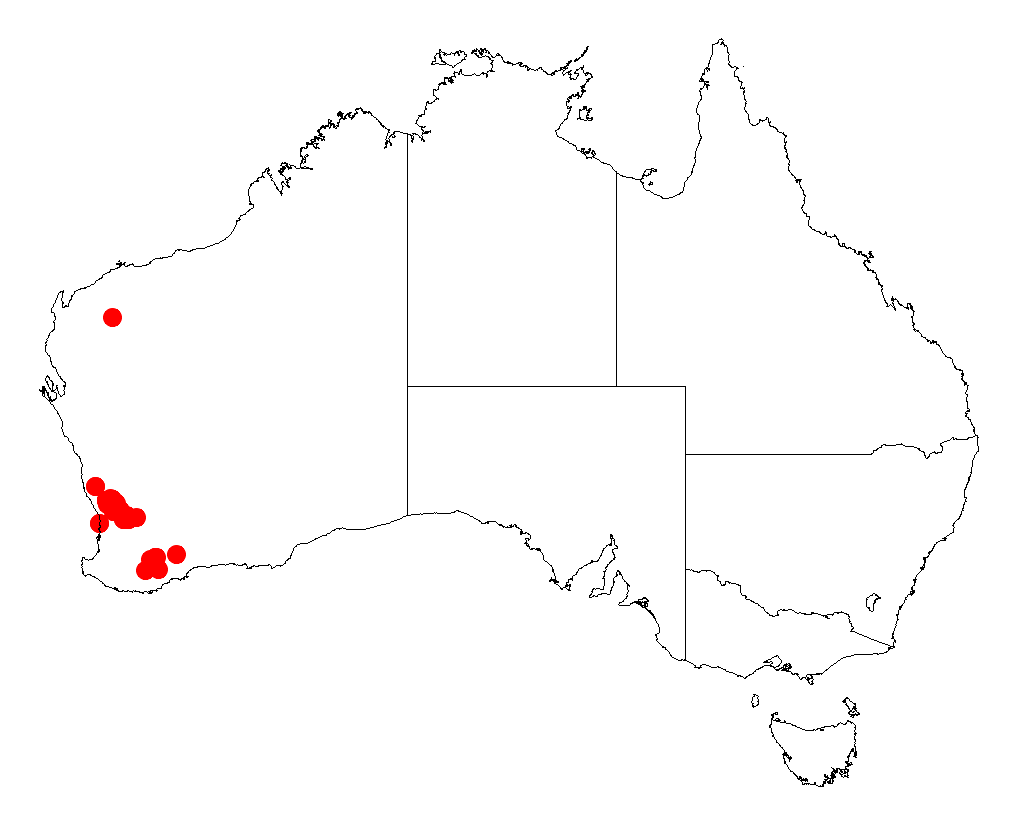
- Occurrence data from AVH

Synonyms
- Acacia crassissipula Benth. ex Seem. orth. var.; Acacia crassistipulea F.Muell. orth. var.; Racosperma crassistipulum (Benth.) Pedley

Species of legume

Habit in Tarin Rock Nature Reserve, near Lake Grace

Acacia crassistipula is a species of flowering plant in the family Fabaceae and is endemic to the south-west of Western Australia. It is a low-spreading, more or less compact shrub with leaf-like stipules, erect, narrowly oblong to narrowly elliptic phyllodes, spherical heads of golden yellow flowers and narrowly oblong, wavy or curved pods.

== Description ==
Acacia crassistipula is a low-spreading, more or less compact shrub that typically grows to a height of 15–50 cm (5.9–19.7 in) and has ribbed branchlets covered in fine, soft hairs. Its phyllodes are hairy, narrowly oblong to narrowly elliptic, 7–16 mm (0.28–0.63 in) long, 1.5–3 mm (0.059–0.118 in) wide and slightly S-shaped with a more or less hooked end. There is one vein on each surface of the phyllodes and obscure lateral veins. There are leaf-like stipules 2–7 mm (0.079–0.276 in) long at the base of the phyllodes. The flowers are borne in a spherical to slightly oblong head in axils on a peduncle 5–10 mm (0.20–0.39 in) long. Each head is 5–6 mm (0.20–0.24 in) in diameter with 27 to 33 densely arranged, golden yellow flowers. Flowering occurs from July to August and the pods are narrowly oblong, wavy or curved, up to 40 mm (1.6 in) long, 3–5 mm (0.12–0.20 in) wide and thinly leathery to crusty. The seeds are egg-shaped to widely elliptic, 2–3 mm (0.079–0.118 in) long and shiny dark brown.

== Taxonomy ==
Acacia crassistipula was first formally described in 1842 by the botanist George Bentham in Hooker's London Journal of Botany from specimens collected by James Drummond in the Swan River Colony. The specific epithet (crassistipula) means 'a thick stipule'.

== Distribution and habitat ==
This species of wattle grows in sandy and lateritic, gravelly soils from around Mogumber in the north down near York in the south and between Borden, Tambellup and Nyabing in open heath and Eucalyptus wandoo woodland, in the Avon Wheatbelt, Jarrah Forest, Mallee and Swan Coastal Plain bioregions of south-western Western Australia.

== Conservation status ==
Acacia crassistipula is listed as "not threatened" by the Government of Western Australia Department of Biodiversity, Conservation and Attractions.

== See also ==
- List of Acacia species
