= Christophe Samuel =

Malagasy politician

Christophe Samuel (born 3 April 1961 in Maintirano) was a Malagasy politician. He was a member of the Senate of Madagascar for Melaky, and a member of the Tiako I Madagasikara party.

He died of a heart attack in February 2017.
