= John White Mellor =

Australian ornithologist (1868–1931)

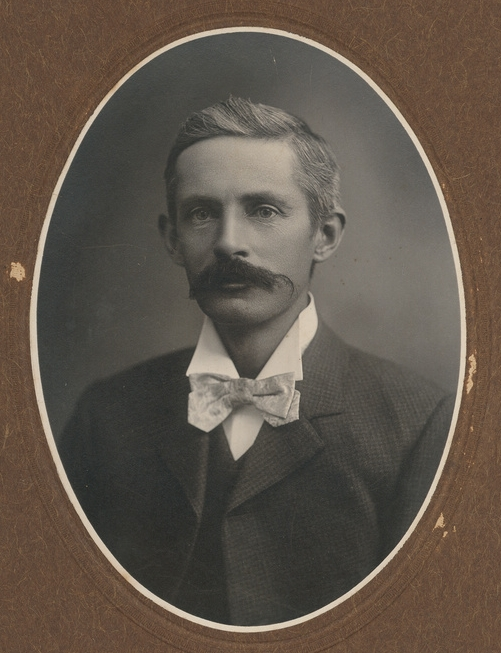
- Born: 1868
- Died: 1931 (aged 62–63)
- Occupation: ornithologist

John White Mellor (1868 – 10 October 1931) was an Australian naturalist who studied birds and lobbied for their conservation. He presided over the Royal Australasian Ornithologists' Union in 1911-12. The little raven (Corvus mellori) is named after him as are several other subspecies of bird.

== Life and work ==
Mellor's grandfather Joseph (1808-1880) came from Holmfirth, West Yorkshire, to South Australia in 1840. His son John Fox (1845-1913), the father of John White, worked on farming business with interests in natural history, athletics and religion. He kept aviaries at his home "Holmfirth" with nearly 200 species of birds. John White was born in this household and took an interest in birds from an early age. His mother Eliza née White (d. 1919) was involved in the local chapter of the Society for the Prevention of Cruelty to Animals. She was a sister of Samuel White who was the father of the ornithologist Samuel Albert White.

White made natural history collections from an early age and was a member of the Reedbeds Rifle Club. He was a member of the Field Naturalists Section of the Royal Society of South Australia who made an outing to their collections in 1899. He was a founding member of the South Australian Ornithological Association. He married Maud Elliott (1886-1951) in 1913 and they would have four sons (one died in infancy) and a daughter. They lived at "Mellor Park' in Lockleys from 1915. Here Mellor kept an aviary that included several species of cockatoos.

Mellor became involved in bird conservation from 1894 with the Native Fauna and Flora Committee. He was involved in the drafting of the Birds' Protection Act of 1900 and helped create a list of birds. He was also involved in protection of pelicans which were considered as competition by fishers. Mellor travelled to Ceylon for collecting specimens with his uncle William White in 1893. He visited Tring and New York and examined bird collections and observed seabirds during this travel.

The raven species now known as the little raven was first described as a subspecies of Corvus marianae by G. M. Mathews in 1912 but this was found to be distinctive enough based on calls and behavior to be raised to the rank of a full species.
