= Lel Chamel =

Lel Chamel (Heading North)
- Directed by: Youssef Chebbi
- Screenplay by: Youssef Chebbi
- Produced by: Paprika Films Élefanto Films
- Starring: Helmi Dridi Mohamed Hassine Grayaa Bilel Briki Nasreddine Manaï Khalil Ben Hmida
- Cinematography: Amine Messadi
- Edited by: Valentin Féron
- Music by: Valentin Féron Youssef Chebbi
- Release date: 2010
- Running time: 15'
- Countries: France; Tunisia

Lel Chamel is a 2010 Tunisian film directed by Youssef Chebbi.

== Synopsis ==
One pitch black night, on a remote beach, Mehdi and Nito, two smugglers of illegal immigrants, are about to seal a deal with the Albanese mafia. Things turn bad when Mehdi realizes that his younger brother Mouja is about to embark on this journey. Unaware of the real nature of the operation, the young man dreams of Europe and fortune. But Mehdi is ready to do anything to save his brother from the hands of the mafia.

== Awards ==
- Vues d’Afrique, Montreal, 2011
