= Shmuel Pinchasi =

Religious leader from Jerusalem

Rabbi Shmuel Pinchasi

Personal life
- Parent: Moshe Pinchasi
- Occupation: Rabbi, Talmudic scholar, judge, lecturer, recognized halakhic authority

Religious life
- Religion: Judaism
- Denomination: Orthodox Judaism
- Yeshiva: Darchei David
- Organisation: Halichot Olam
- Residence: Jerusalem, Israel

Rabbi Shmuel Pinchasi is the rabbi of Mahane Yehuda Market neighborhood in Jerusalem, Israel and a Dayan in Beit Din Halichot Olam of Darchei David Beit Midrash. He is also the author of a number of Seforim and the president of Mishkan Levi Institution. His sons are also accomplished authors; his son Moshe published the popular Torat HaYeshiva, relevant laws for students studying in yeshiva.

== Works ==
- Imrei Shefer, Hagot uMachshavah (6. vols)
- Imrei Shefer, Pirkei Avot (3 vols.) excellent expounding of Mishnayot
- veDaber Davar, on the laws of Amirah LeAkum on Shabbat
- Chaim vaChesed, a popular work on the laws of mourning
- Minchat Shmuel (3 vols.), responsa
- Pirkei Chinuch
- Kuntress vekhol HaChaim
