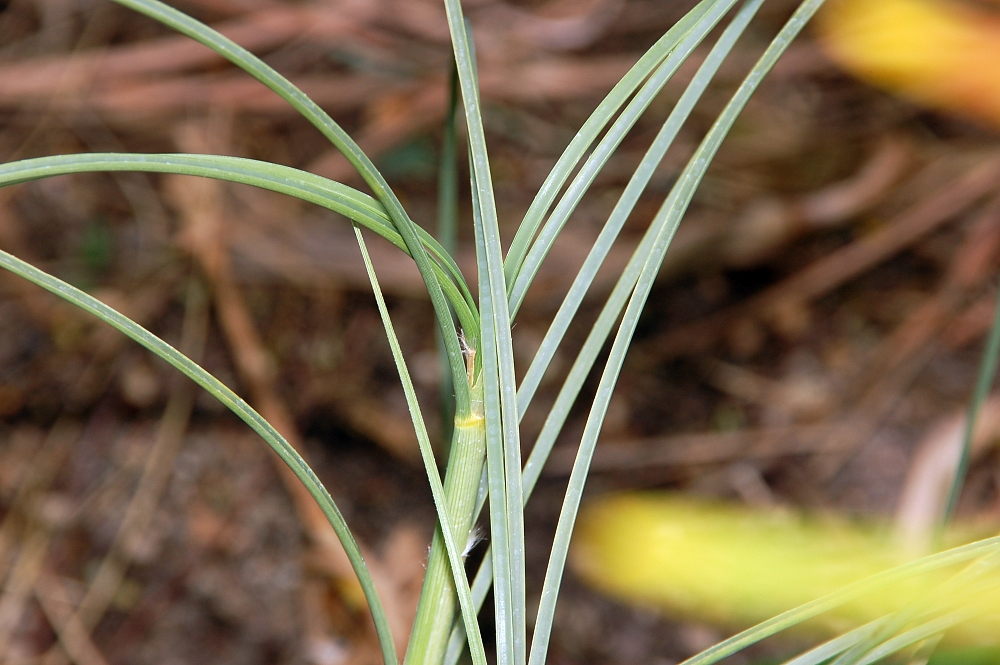

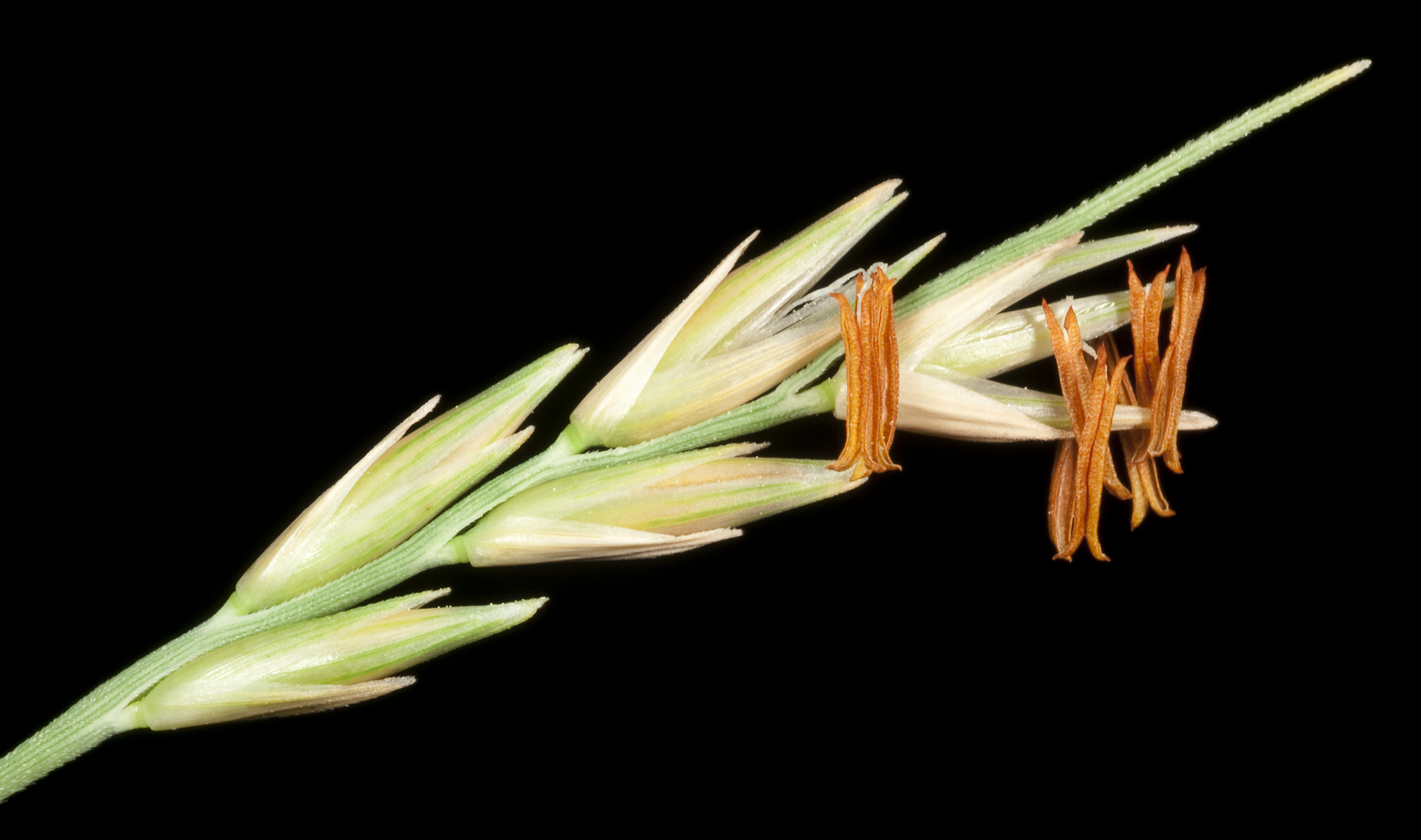

Scientific classification
- Kingdom: Plantae
- Clade: Tracheophytes
- Clade: Angiosperms
- Clade: Monocots
- Clade: Commelinids
- Order: Poales
- Family: Poaceae
- Subfamily: Panicoideae
- Genus: Spinifex
- Species: S. longifolius

Binomial name
- Spinifex longifolius R.Br.

Synonyms
- Spinifex littoreus var. longifolius (R.Br.) Backer; Spinifex fragilis R.Br.

= Spinifex longifolius =

Beach spinifex

Species of plant

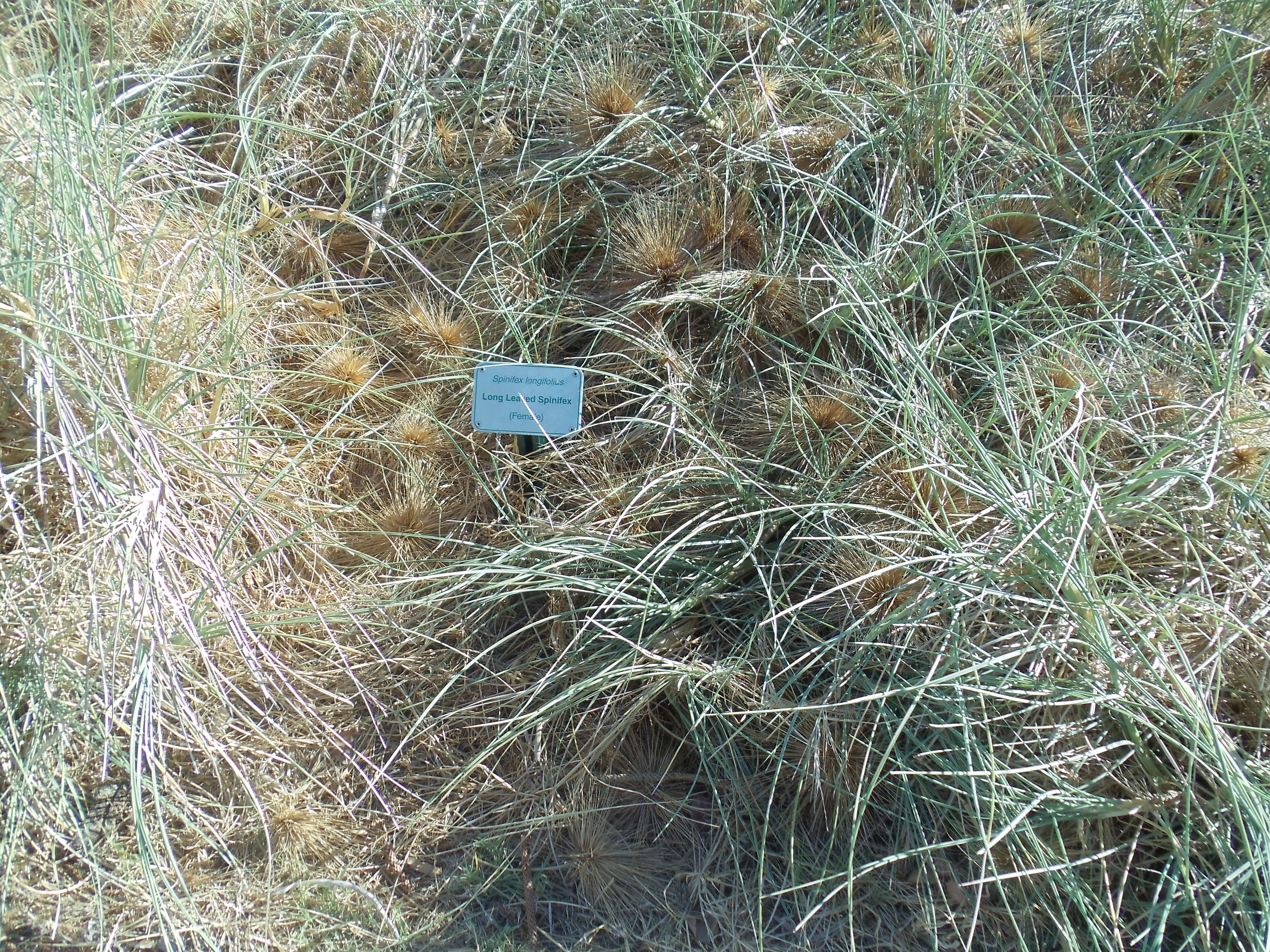
Spinifex longifolius in the Grant Marine Park in Cottesloe, Western Australia.

Spinifex longifolius, commonly known as beach spinifex, is a perennial grass that grows in sandy regions along the seacoast. It also lives in most deserts around Australia.

== Description ==
It grows as a tussock from 30 centimetres to a metre high, and up to two metres wide. It has long flat leaves, and green or brown flowers.

It is similar in appearance to S. littoreus, but that species has hard, sharp leaves capable of drawing blood, whereas the leaves of S. longifolius are a good deal softer.

== Taxonomy ==
It was first published by Robert Brown in his 1810 Prodromus Florae Novae Hollandiae.

== Distribution and habitat ==
It occurs on coastal dunes of white sand, in Australia, Indonesia, and Thailand. In Australia, it occurs from Cape Leeuwin in Western Australia, north and east to the western edge of Cape York Peninsula in Queensland.

== Aboriginal uses ==
The Noongar people of southwest Western Australia used the juice from the young tips of the plant to drip into eyes as a relief for conjunctivitis.
