= Shmueli =

Shmueli is a Jewish name and may refer to:

- Doron Shmueli, Israeli politician
- Galit Shmueli, Data scientist
- Shmueli Ungar, American religious singer
- Zehava Shmueli, Israeli long distance runner
