= Thangadurai Samuel =

Thangadurai Samuel is a classical guitarist from India.

Samuel founded the Madras Guitar Society in 1988 which became the Madras Guitar String Ensemble in 1991. The Calcutta Classical Guitar Society honored him with a lifetime achievement award in 2010. He is the first classical guitarist to complete the practical part of the Trinity College of Music examination from Madras. He has taught several people throughout the past few decades, changing all of them to become great guitarists.
