= Marcus Samuel =

Marcus Samuel may refer to:

- Marcus Samuel, 1st Viscount Bearsted (1853–1927), founder of the Shell Transport and Trading Company
- Marcus Samuel, 3rd Viscount Bearsted (1909–1986), British peer and company director
- Marcus Samuel (philatelist) (1904–1997), British philatelist
- Marcus Samuel (politician) (1873–1942), British Member of Parliament for Putney, 1934–1942
