= Eboule Bille Samuel =

Cameroonian footballer (born 1982)

Sammy Bille
Personal information
- Full name: Samuel Eboule Bille
- Date of birth: 16 January 1982 (age 44)
- Place of birth: Douala, Cameroon
- Height: 1.85 m (6 ft 1 in)
- Position: Central defender

Senior career*
Years	Team	Apps	(Gls)
1998–2004	Sable FC		
2004–2006	Impôts FC		
2006–2007	Witbank Spurs	26	(3)
2007–2008	Mpumalanga Black Aces	28	(4)
2008–2011	F.C. Cape Town	80	(7)
2012–2014	Rajnavy		
- * Club domestic league appearances and goals

Samuel Eboule Bille (born January 16, 1982) is a Cameroonian football player.

== Playing career ==
Bille captained South African National First Division side FC Cape Town during the 2010 season. He helped lead the club into the 1/8-finals of the 2010 Nedbank Cup, scoring a goal in the team's victory over Kaizer Chiefs. He's got preselected 2 times in Cameroon's National Team in 2000 and 2001.

== Club career ==
- 1998–2004 → Sable, Batie, Cameroon
- 2004–2006 → Impot, Yaounde, Cameroon
- 2006–2007 → Witbank Spurs, South Africa
- 2007–2008 → Mpumalanga Black Aces, South Africa
- 2008–2011 → FC Cape Town, South Africa
- 2011–2013 → Rajchanavy FC, Thailand

== Award career ==
- 1998-1999 Champion of Cameroon League 98/99 sable of batie
- 2000 Winner of the super cup Roger Milla 2000 sable of batie
- 2008 Finalist of the nedbank cup Mpumalanga black aces
- 2010 Quarter final of the nedbank cup fc cape town
