= Samuel Martin (entrepreneur) =

British businessman and entrepreneur

- Born: Samuel William Martin; June 1984 (age 42); United Kingdom
- Occupation: Businessman
- Known for: Founder & CEO of Quintessentially People

Samuel ("Sam") William Martin is a British businessman and entrepreneur. From 2011 to 2017 he was Founder, President and CEO of Quintessentially People, an arm of Quintessentially Group. Martin's business partner was Ben Elliot, Chairman of the UK's Conservative Party and nephew of King Charles III and Queen Camilla.

== Early life ==
Martin was born in the United Kingdom in June 1984.

In 2000, Martin represented the United Kingdom at NASA's International Space Academy in Houston, Texas where he resided with International Space Station Astronaut Paul Richards, who flew aboard Space Shuttle Mission STS-102.

On 16 August 2001, whilst training for his US pilot's licence in Florida, Martin was involved in a serious plane crash in the town of Summerfield. Martin returned to the UK shortly after the accident and went on to gain his European pilot's licence in England, UK and the following year his United States pilot's licence.

== Career ==
Martin's early career included work for organisations such as the Ministry of Defence, ITV and Selfridges.

Up to 2011 he was an aide to a high-profile US-Swiss couple, and in that year he co-founded a new arm of the Quintessentially Group called Quintessentially People, which has been described as "a recruiting agency that provides staff to royal families, politicians and international executives, as well as 'high-profile names' in music, fashion, film and television".

The company had its headquarters in London, with 5 further offices in New York City, Los Angeles, Fort Lauderdale, Cannes and Palma.

In September 2016, Martin was shortlisted for the award "Business Leader of the Year" at the IRP Awards - the highest and most prestigious accolade an individual can receive in the industry. The outcome is announced in December 2016.

Since 2018, Martin has been the co-founder of 19 London, a recruitment agency focussing on the provision of staff for high net worth and high-profile individuals and families worldwide.

== Media ==
In 2013, for their 25th anniversary edition, GQ magazine asked 25 public figures to select their "Men of the Next 25 Years", those who they thought would "dominate the next 25 years". Martin was chosen for the list by The Queen's nephew Ben Elliot, who described him as having done "a lot of favours for people and created enormous goodwill".

Martin has been interviewed for numerous high-profile national and international media.

== Personal life ==
As of 2015 Martin lives in London.
