= Shamil Shetekauri =

Georgian botanist (1955–2018)

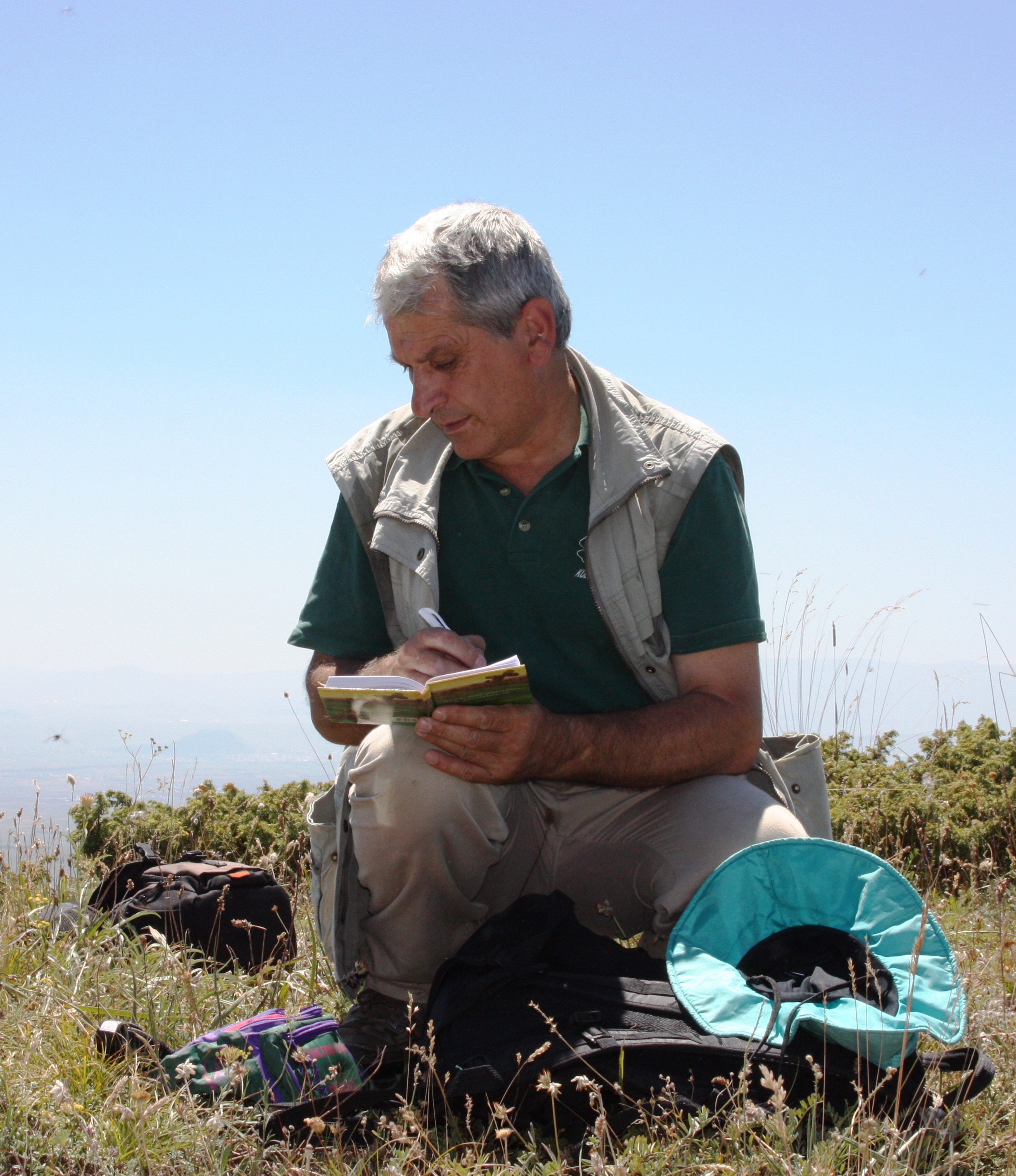
- Born: July 10, 1955 (age 71); Khone, Dusheti District, Georgia
- Education: Georgian State Institute of Agriculture
- Known for: Study of flora, high mountain biodiversity, endemism, habitats and geography of plants
- Scientific career
- Fields: Botany, Ppant ecology
- Workplaces: Tbilisi State University, Tbilisi Botanical Garden and Institute of Botany,

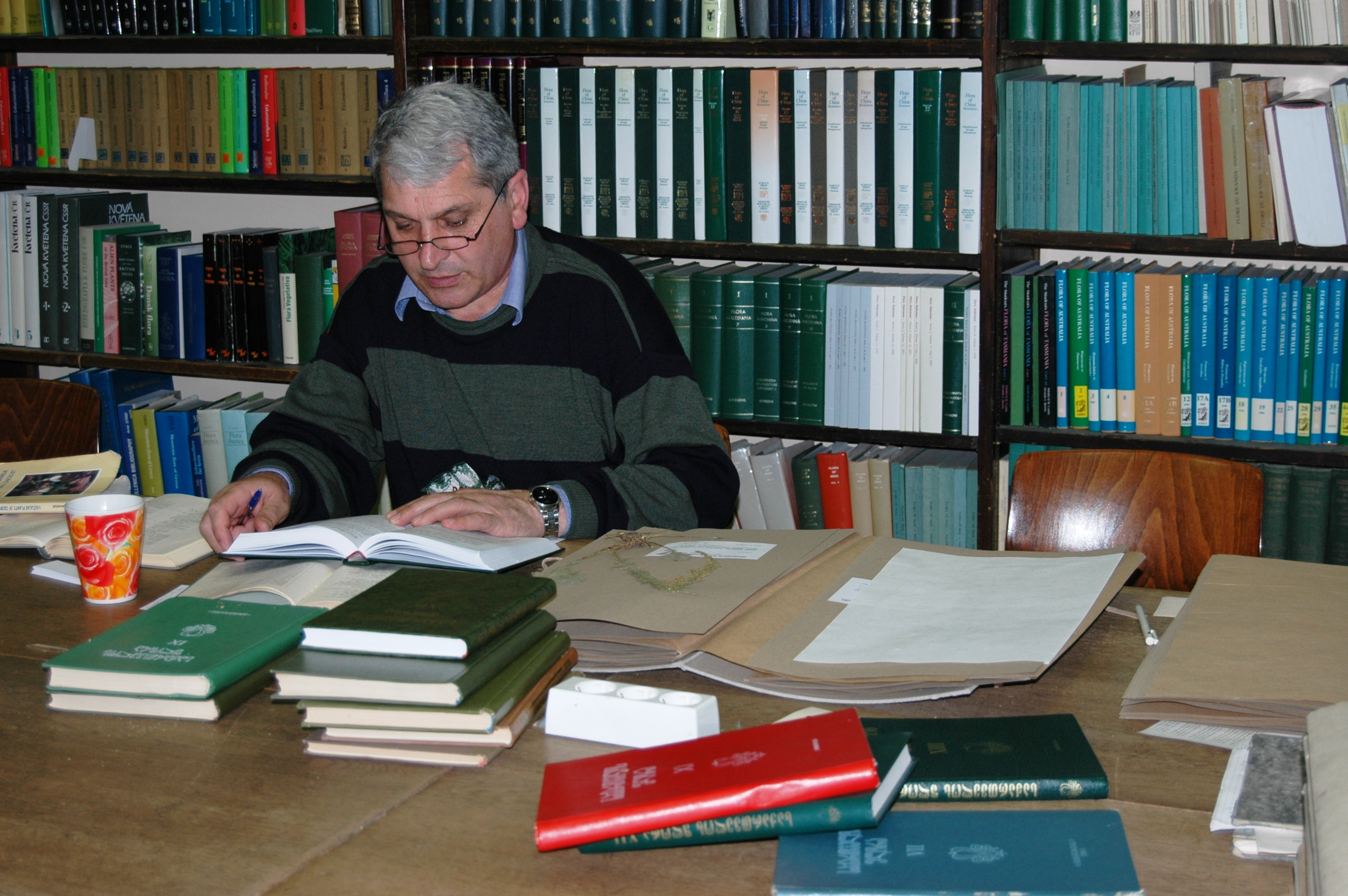
Herbarium of University of Jena, 2008

Shamil Shetekauri (Georgian: შამილ შეთეკაური; born July 10, 1955) is a Georgian scientist, botanist, and botanical geography specialist in the study of flora, biodiversity, taxonomy of plants and plant ecology.

Member of the Georgian Botanical Society (საქართველოს ბოტანიკური საზოგადოება) (1980), Member of the International Organisation for the Phytotaxonomic Investigation Mediterranean Area (OPTIMA) (2002), Member International Geographical Union (IGU) (2002), Head of the NGO "TEBULO" (2002), Fellow of the London Linnean Society (FLS), regional expert in Caucasus of the International Union for Conservation of Nature (IUCN) (2008), Member of scientific chamber of Botanical Institute of Ketskhoveli (კეცხოველის ბოტანიკის ინსტიტუტი) (2008).

== Biography ==
Shamil Shetekauri was born July 10, 1955, in Khone, Dusheti District, Georgia. In 1973–1978 he successfully finished Faculty of Gardening and Viticulture in Georgian State Institute of Agriculture (სასოფლო-სამეურნეო ინსტიტუტი) and received Master of Sciences in Agronomy. In 1982–1985 he studied in Postgraduate school of the Institute of Botany of the Georgian Academy of Sciences. In 1986 he made Candidate of Biological of Sciences (equivalent to PhD, flora, botany). In 1999 he was made Doctor of Biological of Sciences (equivalent to ScD, Flora, Botany).

Since 2010, he has served as a chief researcher and head of Department Plant Systematic and Geography Tbilisi Botanical Garden and Institute of Botany. From 2006 he has been a professor at Tbilisi State University. He has worked as a leading researcher, at the Institute of Botany of Academy of Sciences of Georgia since 2001.

An endemic spider species of the Caucasus has been named after him: Incestophantes shetekaurii (Linyphiidae),.

== Works ==
- Ш.К. Шетекаури, Л.А. Цискараули. 2004. Cистематическая и географическая структура высокогорных лугов Большого Kавказа (в пределах Грузии). Кавк. геогр. журнал, Тбилиси, 4, с. 68–74.
- Ш.К. Шетекаури. 2004. Анализ высокогорной дендрофлоры Сванети, Рача-Лечхуми, Шига Картли (южные склоны Центрального Кавказа). Зам. сист. геогр. раст. Тбилиси, вып. 44–45, 165–171.
- Р.И. Гагнидзе, К.Р. Кимеридзе, Н.А. Маргалитадзе, Ш.К. Шетекаури, Д.К.Челидзе, Д.Г. Кикодзе. 2004. Стратегия охраны флороценотипов Кавказа. Зам. сист. геогр. раст. Тбилиси, вып. 44–45, 172–176.
- R. Gagnidze, Sh. Shetekauri, N. Margalitadze, A.Kikodze. 2006. Svaneti. Tbilisi, 53 p.
- Sh. Shetekauri, L. Tsiskarauli, T. Zangurashvili. 2006. "High mountain flora of Pirikitio Khevsureti and Tusheti (northeastern part of the Caucasus)". Flora Mediterranea, vol. 16. pp. 355–378
- Ш. К. Шетекаури, Л. А. Цискеараули, Н. Г. Барнавели. 2007 Вотанико- географическое разнообразие дендрофлоры высокогорий Большого Кавказа. Кавказск. геогр. журн. 7, pp. 170–176
- S. SeTekauri, m. pavliaSvili. 2009. მდინარე ქსნის ხეობის წყალშემკრები აუზის მდელოების ტაქსონომიურ-გეოგრაფიული სტრუქტურა და ფლორეცენოზური ეტიუდები.
- Sh. Shetekauri, Jacoby M. 2009. Mountain Flowers & Trees of Caucasia. Istanbul. Bunebaprint, 320p.
- Sh. Shetekauri, Jacoby M. 2009. Gebirgsflora & Baume des Kaukasus. Istanbul. Bunebaprint, 315s.
- Th. Gregor, Lmeierott & Sh. Shetekauri, 2010. "Fruhling im Lagodekhi-Urwald". Natur und Museum. Band 140, Heft 3 /4. Senkenberg

== See also ==
- List of Georgians
- List of botanists
