= Samuel Barnett =

Samuel Barnett may refer to:

- Samuel Barnett (actor) (born 1980), English actor
- Samuel Barnett (reformer) (1844–1913), English clergyman and social reformer
- Samuel Jackson Barnett (1873–1956), American physicist, discoverer of the Barnett effect
