= Shamel =

Shamel is a Goan percussion instrument. There are two variants of shamel: the original one, and the zod shamel. The shamel is played with two thin cane or bamboo sticks, one of which is straight, and the other is curved at the end. The sticks are from a tree called beth. The shamel is vase shaped and covered with goat skin. The base of the shamel is carved out of 'Khair' (acacia catechu) wood. The height of the shamel varies from 25-40 cm while the length of the sticks is around 30–35 cm.
