= Samuel Peltyn =

Samuel Hirsh Peltyn
- Born: May 1831; Mariampol, Augustów Voivodeship, Kingdom of Poland
- Died: 30 September 1896 (aged 65); Warsaw, Warsaw Governorate, Russian Empire
- Resting place: Okopowa Street Jewish Cemetery
- Occupations: Writer, translator, and publisher
- Spouse: Salome Gladsztern
- Writing career
- Language: Polish

Samuel Zvi Hirsh "Henryk" Peltyn (Yiddish: שמואל צבי הירש בן משה פּעלטין, romanized: Shmuel Tzvi Hirsh ben Moshe Peltin; May 1831 – 30 September 1896) was a Polish Jewish writer, translator, and publisher.

== Biography ==
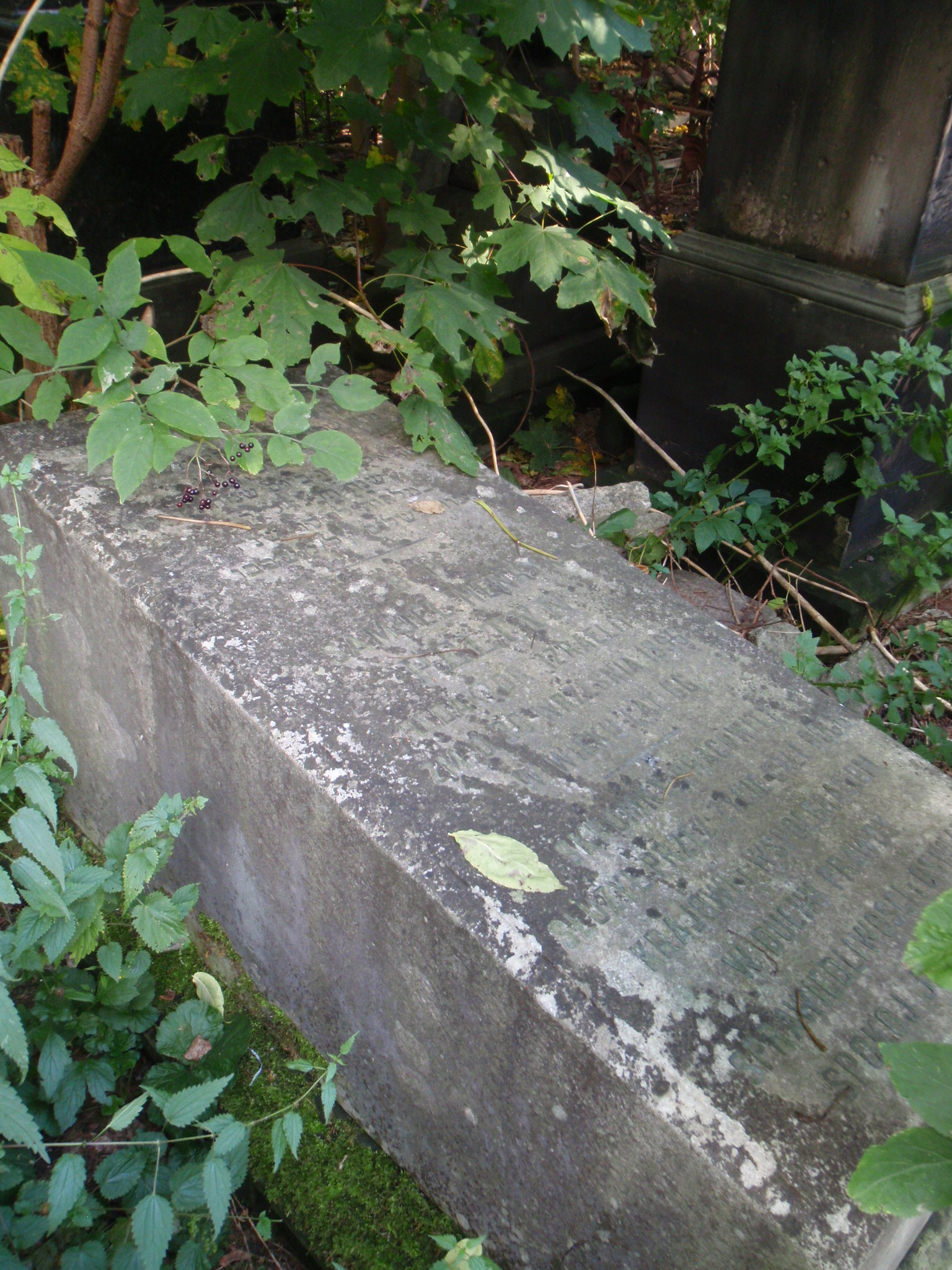
Grave of Samuel Hirsh Peltin

Samuel Hirsh Peltyn was born at Mariampol, where he studied Bible, Talmud, sciences, and languages. There he taught Hebrew and Polish and published a Polish grammar textbook for Yiddish-speaking children.

In 1855 Peltyn settled in Warsaw to work in journalism and publishing, publishing articles promoting reform of Judaism, productivization, and the cultural Polonization of Jews. In 1865 he established the Izraelita, a Polish weekly devoted to Jewish interests, remaining its editor throughout his life. In this journal he wrote, besides feuilletons, articles on religion, ethics, Jewish history, and anti-Semitism, with the goal of encouraging Jewish assimilation into mainstream gentile culture. He wrote also a number of tales of Jewish life, and made translations of the works of Leopold Kompert and others.

Peltyn was active in the Reform temple in Warsaw and attempted to give a Polish rather than a German orientation to the service and the sermon. In 1875 he published an article arguing for the introduction of the organ into synagogue liturgy.

Peltyn was strongly opposed to Yiddish language and literature, seeing the language as standing in the way of the Europeanisation of Jews. In 1896, not long before his death, Peltyn's article was featured on the front page of Izraelita to protest against the project promoting Yiddish publications in Warsaw. Upon his death in 1896, Peltyn's position as editor-in-chief of Izraelita was taken over by Nahum Sokolow.
