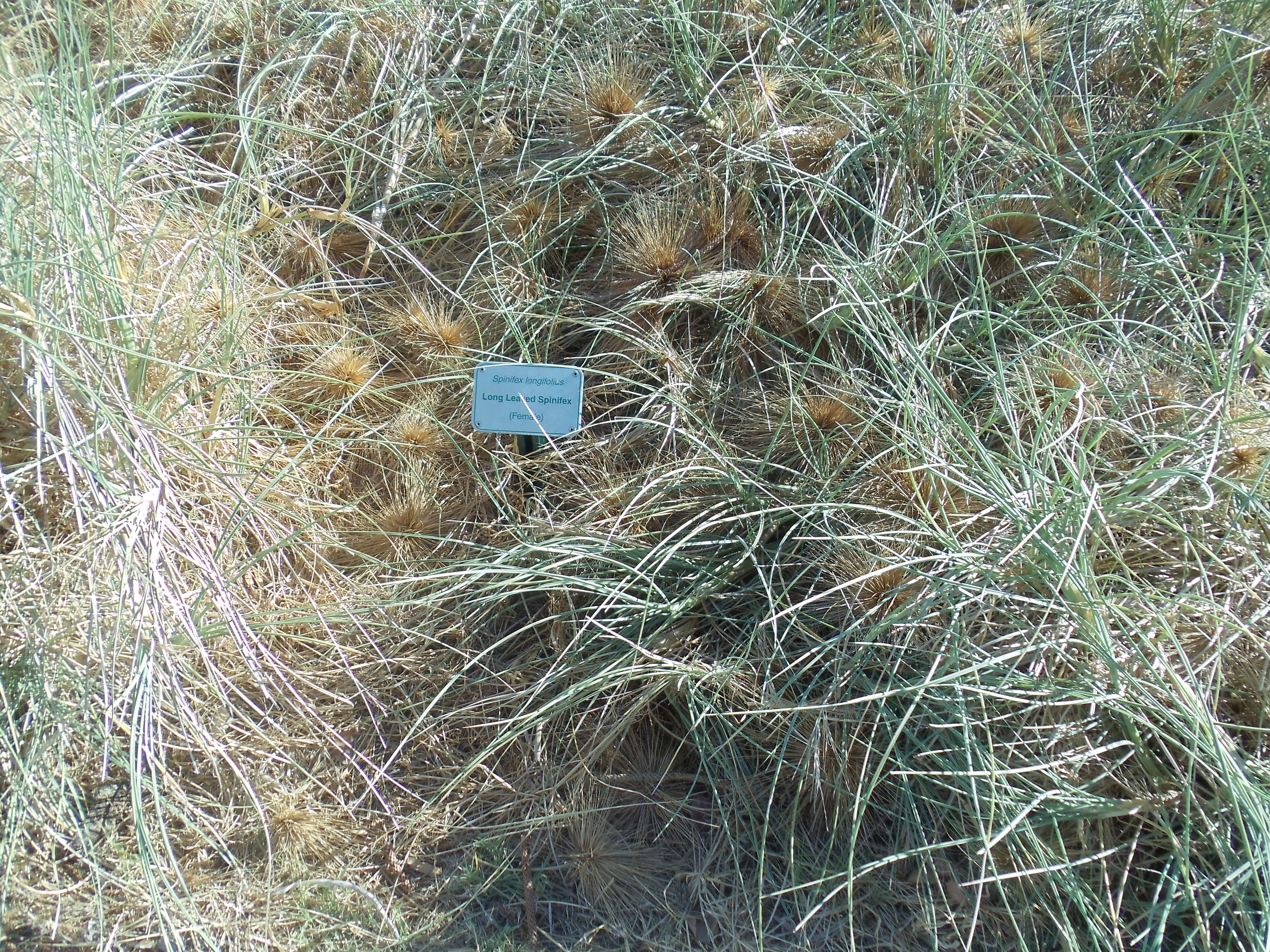
- Spinifex longifolius Grant Marine Park; Cottesloe, Western Australia.

Scientific classification
- Kingdom: Plantae
- Clade: Tracheophytes
- Clade: Angiosperms
- Clade: Monocots
- Clade: Commelinids
- Order: Poales
- Family: Poaceae
- Subfamily: Panicoideae
- Subtribe: Cenchrinae
- Genus: Spinifex; L.

Type species
- Spinifex squarrosus (syn of S. littoreus) L.

Synonyms
- Ixalum G.Forst

= Spinifex (coastal grass) =

Genus of grasses

Spinifex is a genus of perennial coastal plants in the grass family.

They are one of the most common plants that grow in sand dunes along the coasts of Africa, Middle East, Asia, Australia, New Zealand, and New Caledonia, with the ranges of some species extending north and west along the coasts of Asia as far as India and Japan. As they help stabilise the sand, these grasses are an important part of the entire sand dune ecosystem. The single species indigenous to New Zealand, Spinifex sericeus, is also found in Australia.

The word "spinifex" also serves as a common name for grasses in the related genus Triodia, and this sometimes leads to misunderstanding, Triodia however is native to inland Australia and refers to a group of spiny-leaved, tussock-forming grasses.

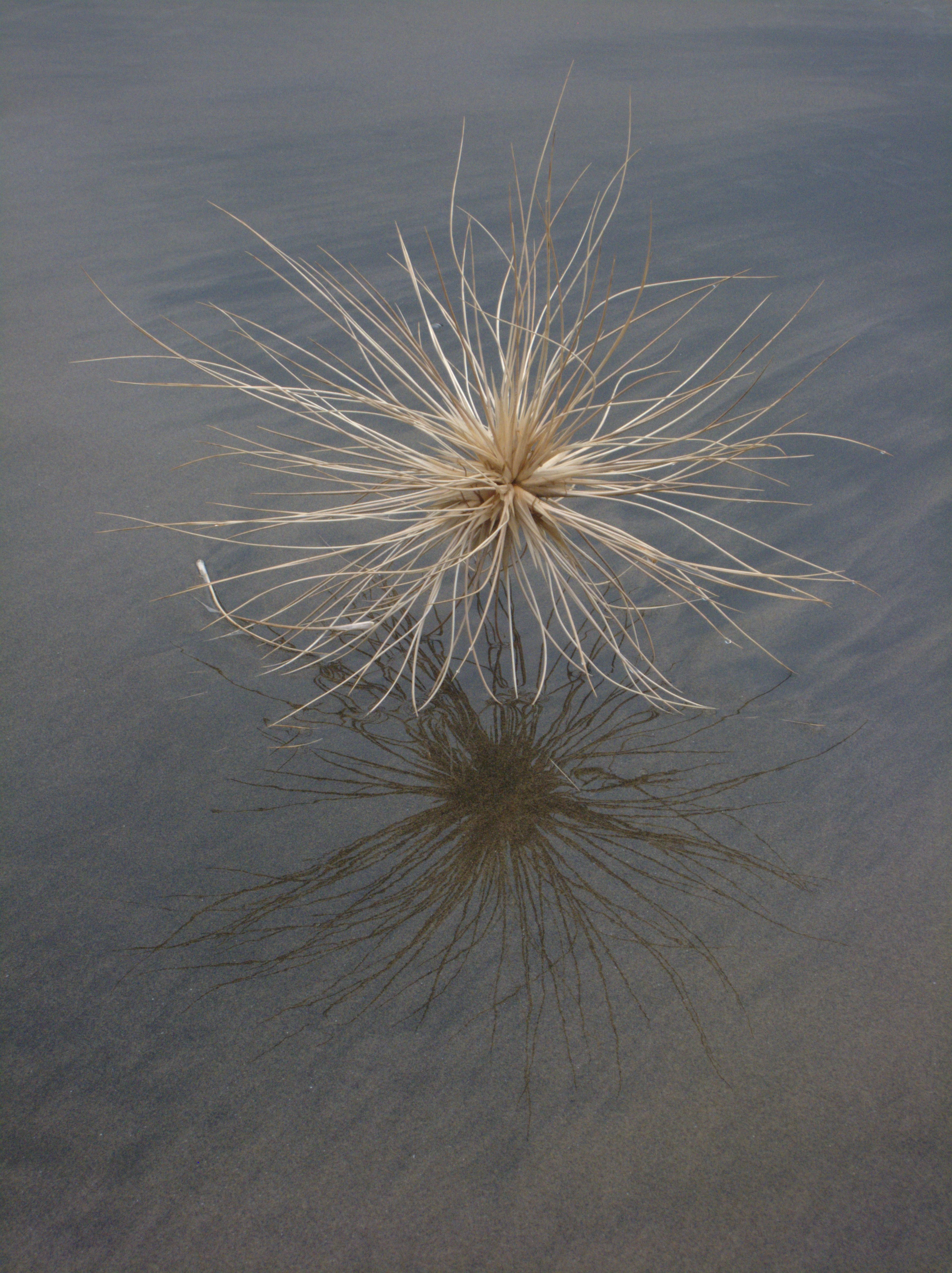
Spinifex seed head, resting on the beach.

== Species ==
Species include:

- Spinifex × alterniflorus Nees – Western Australia
- Spinifex hirsutus Labill. – all 6 states of Australia
- Spinifex littoreus (Burm.f.) Merr. – Ashmore Reef in Western Australia; New Guinea, Indonesia, Malaysia, Philippines, Indochina, Indian subcontinent, China (Fujian, Guangdong, Guangxi, Hainan), Taiwan, Japan including Ryukyu Islands
- Spinifex longifolius R.Br. – Thailand, Indonesia, New Guinea, Queensland, Northern Territory, Western Australia, South Australia
- Spinifex sericeus R.Br. – all 6 states of Australia plus Norfolk Island, New Zealand, New Caledonia, Tonga

=== Formerly included ===
Species formerly included:

- Spinifex paradoxus (now Zygochloa paradoxa)
