= Samuel Albert White =

Australian racehorse owner, soldier, explorer, conservationist and amateur ornithologist

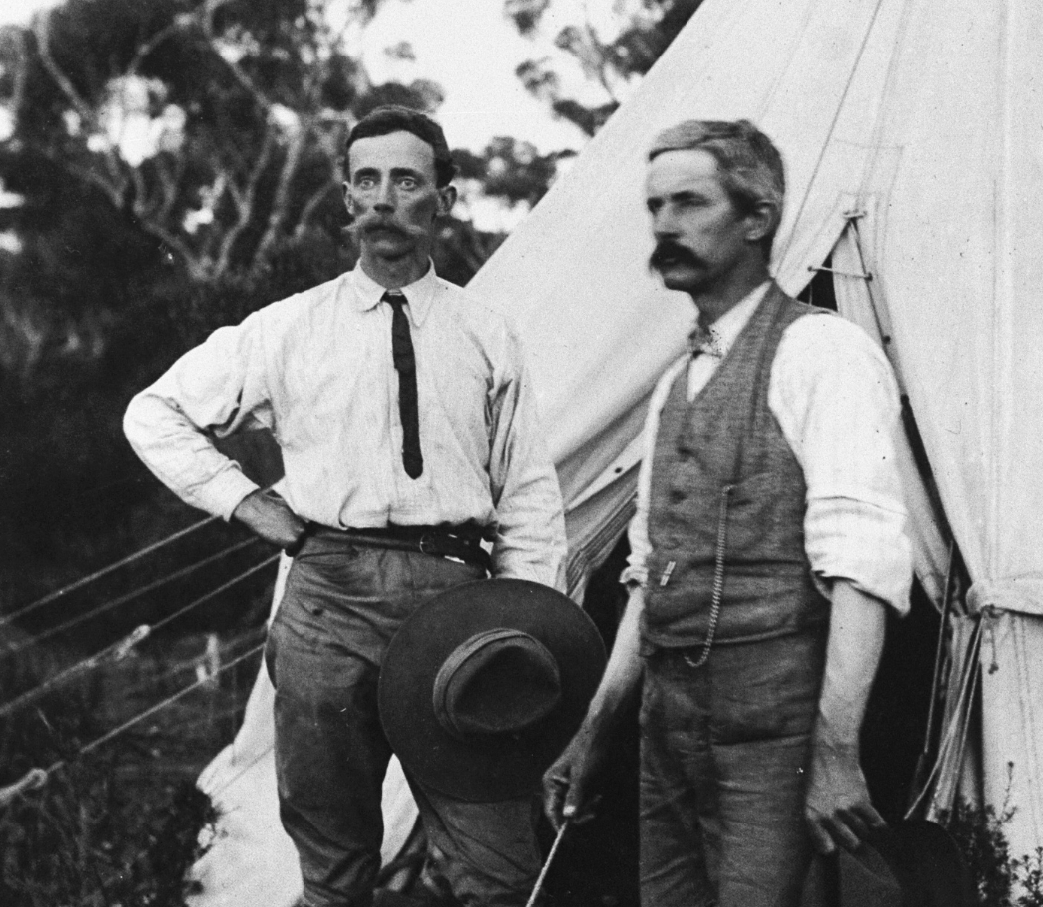
S. A. White with his cousin John White Mellor, 1909

Captain Samuel Albert White (20 December 1870 – 19 January 1954) was a wealthy Australian racehorse owner, soldier, explorer, conservationist and amateur ornithologist. He was born in Fulham, South Australia and eventually died there. He fought in the South African War 1900–1903, reaching the rank of captain, which title he continued to use throughout his life. He made several private ornithological collecting expeditions across remote areas of Australia, to Alice Springs (1913), Musgrave and Everard Ranges (1914), Cooper Creek (1916), Nullarbor Plain (1917-1918), Finke River (1921), and Adelaide to Darwin and return (1922), on behalf of Gregory Mathews.

White was a foundation member of the South Australian Ornithological Association (SAOA) in 1899, and served as its president for several periods between 1904 and 1944. He was also a foundation member of the Royal Australasian Ornithologists Union (RAOU) in 1901, and served as its president 1914–1916.

== Family ==
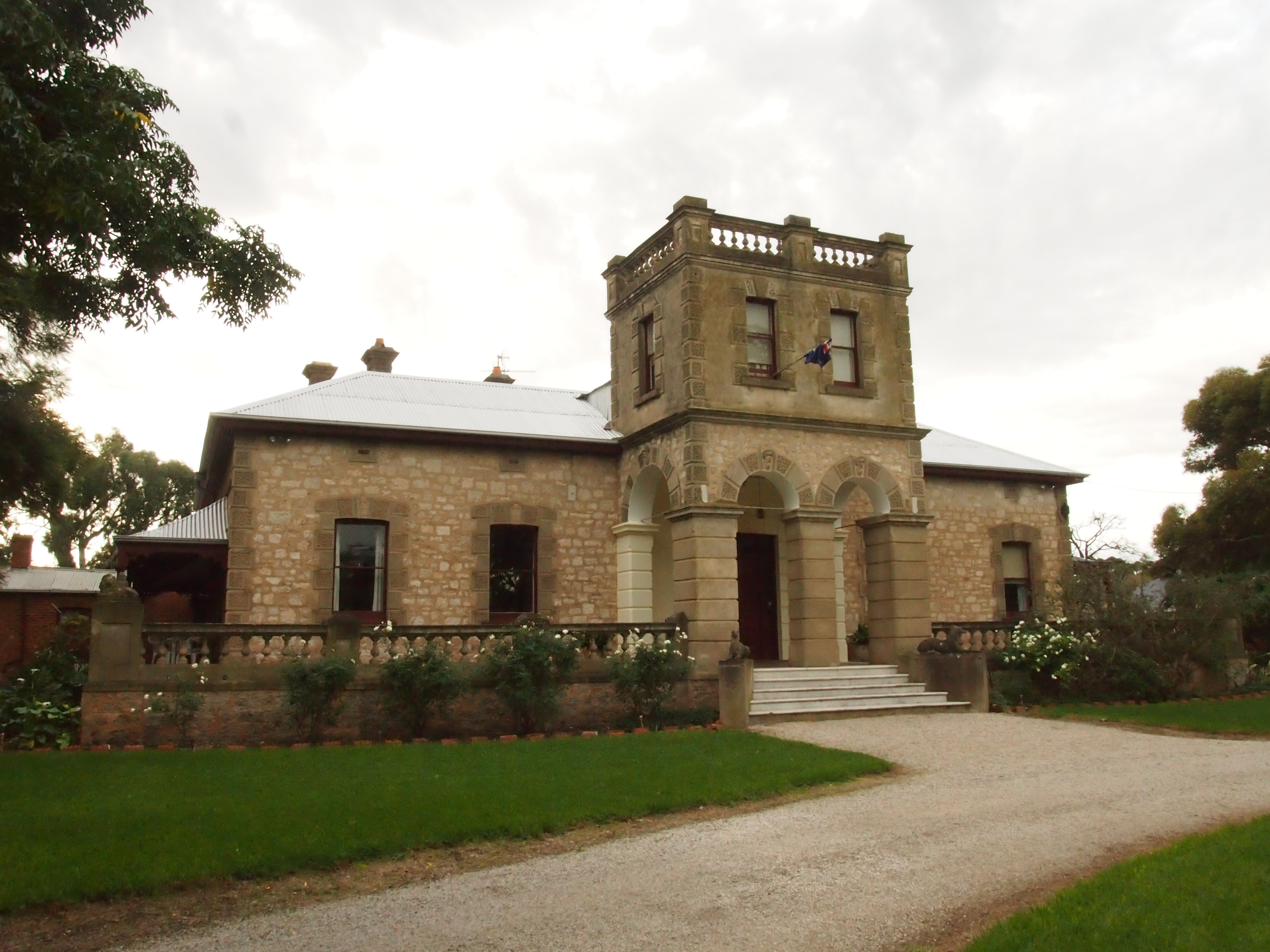
Weetunga, Fulham, built in 1878 by Samuel White, son of John White

The White family were among the earliest settlers in South Australia. John White (died 30 December 1860) arrived in November 1836 aboard the Tam O'Shanter. Within months of arrival he purchased land which now lies in the suburb of Fulham, naming it Fulham Farm after the suburb of Fulham in his native London. The White family home, Weetunga, built by his son, Samuel White (15 June 1835 – 16 November 1880), father of Samuel Albert White, remained with the family until being placed on the market in 2014.

White's father, Samuel White, was also an enthusiastic ornithologist, venturing on three ambitious and disastrous expeditions. He kept extensive diaries, but except for some notes his research was largely unpublished. The collections he made were mostly lost en route. He died shortly after returning to Sydney to replace a crew that had mutinied on his third expedition.

== Works ==
As well as numerous papers in ornithological journals, works he authored include:

- White, Samuel Albert. (191?). Ornithologists at Warunda Creek. Record of the A.O.U.'s expedition to Eyre Peninsula, October 1909, with notes on ornithology, botany and entomology. W.K. Thomas & Co.: Adelaide.
- White, Samuel Albert. (191?). The Gawler Ranges. An Ornithological Expedition. W.K. Thomas & Co.: Adelaide.
- White, Samuel Albert. (191?). In the Far North-West. An expedition to the Musgrave and Everard Ranges. W.K. Thomas & Co.: Adelaide.
- White, Samuel Albert. (191?). In the Far North-East. A scientific expedition. W.K. Thomas & Co.: Adelaide.
- White, Samuel Albert. (191?). The Cruise of the `Avocet' in Search of Skuas and Other Things. W.K. Thomas & Co.: Adelaide.
- White, Samuel Albert. (191?). Ooldea, on the East-West Railway. On the Flooded Murray River, and other sketches. W.K. Thomas & Co.: Adelaide.
- White, Samuel Albert. (1914). Into the Dead Heart. An ornithological trip through central Australia. W.K. Thomas: Adelaide.
- White, Samuel Albert. (1919). Bunya, or Mystery Mountains. To Robe via the Coorong. A Camp Out in New South Wales. Ornithologists in the West. W.K. Thomas: Adelaide.
- White, Samuel Albert. (1919). Birds recorded from the early days up to the present time for the Reed Beds District. South Australian Ornithologist, 4 (4), 1919.
- White, Samuel Albert. (1920). The Life of Samuel White, Soldier, Naturalist, Sailor. W.K. Thomas & Co.: Adelaide.

== General references ==
- Collier, Roger; Hatch, John; Matheson, Bill; & Russell, Tony. (Eds). (2000). Birds, Birders and Birdwatching, 1899-1999. Celebrating one hundred years of the South Australian Ornithological Association. SAOA: Adelaide. ISBN 0-9595142-2-8
- Linn, Rob. (1989). Nature's Pilgrim. The life and journeys of Captain S.A.White, naturalist, author and conservationist. SA Government Printer: Adelaide. ISBN 0724365486
- Robin, Libby. (2001). The Flight of the Emu: a hundred years of Australian ornithology 1901-2001. Carlton, Vic. Melbourne University Press. ISBN 0-522-84987-3
