= 2010 Pattaya United F.C. season =

Pattaya United
2010 season
- Chairman: Thaned Kruea-rat
- Manager: Somchad Yimsiri
- Thai Premier League: 6th
- FA Cup: Quarter-final
- Queen's Cup: Quarter-final
Home colours	Away colours

The 2010 season was Pattaya United's 2nd season in the top division of Thai football. This article shows statistics of the club's players in the season, and also lists all matches that the club played in the season.

== Chronological list of events ==
- 10 November 2009: The Thai Premier League 2010 season first leg fixtures were announced.
- 15 September 2010: Pattaya United were knocked out of the Thai FA Cup by Chonburi in the quarter-final.
- 24 October 2010: Pattaya United finished in 6th place in the Thai Premier League.

== Players ==
=== Current squad ===
As of 24 January 2010

Note: Flags indicate national team as defined under FIFA eligibility rules; some limited exceptions apply. Players may hold more than one non-FIFA nationality.

No.	Pos.	Nation	Player
1	GK	THA	Prasit Kotmaha
2	DF	CIV	Kignelman Athanase
3	DF	THA	Prawit Prariwanta
4	DF	THA	Sompob Nilwong
5	DF	THA	Niweat Siriwong (vice captain)
6	DF	THA	Prachya Hong-In
7	MF	THA	Ittipol Poolsap
9	FW	THA	Somchai Singmanee
10	FW	THA	Tana Chanabut
11	MF	THA	Santi Chaiyaphurk (captain)
13	DF	THA	Phaisan Pona
16	MF	THA	Nikorn Anuwan

No.	Pos.	Nation	Player
17	FW	THA	Rangsan Roobmoh
18	GK	THA	Narit Taweekul
21	DF	THA	Theerayut Duangpimy
22	MF	THA	Todsapol Karnplook
23	MF	THA	Seeket Madputeh
25	MF	THA	Niranrit Jarernsuk
29	MF	THA	Rangsarit Sutthisa
8	MF	THA	Theerawesin Seehawong
20	FW	CMR	Kengne Ludovick
14	FW	THA	Patiphon Phetwiset
3	DF	THA	Wutthisak Maneesook
6	DF	THA	Wirajroj Chanteng

=== 2010 Season transfers ===
In

Note: Flags indicate national team as defined under FIFA eligibility rules; some limited exceptions apply. Players may hold more than one non-FIFA nationality.

No.	Pos.	Nation	Player
—	DF	THA	Chompon Buangam (from Samut Songkhram FC)

Out

Note: Flags indicate national team as defined under FIFA eligibility rules; some limited exceptions apply. Players may hold more than one non-FIFA nationality.

No.	Pos.	Nation	Player
—	FW	THA	Premwut Wongdee (Transferred to Chonburi FC)
—	DF	THA	Amorn Thammanarm (Transferred to Muangthong United)
—	DF	THA	Mongkol Namnuad (Transferred to Police United FC)
—	MF	GER	Sasa Disic (Released)
—	FW	BRA	Anderson Machado (Released)
—	MF	BRA	Willian Mendonca (Released)
—	MF	BRA	Paulo Roberto (Released)

== Results ==
=== Thai Premier League ===
28 March 2010	Pattaya United	3–1	Rajnavy Rayong	Pattaya
	Ludovick 2'; Tana 38', 45'		Wuttichai A. 85'	Stadium: Nongprue Municipality Football Field; Referee: Apisit Aonrak

4 April 2010	Pattaya United	1–2	Chonburi	Chonburi
	Ludovick 8'		Therdsak 50' (pen.); Ekaphan 82'	Stadium: Nongprue Football Field

11 April 2010	Royal Thai Army	0–2	Pattaya United	Bangkok
			Patipol 86'; Rangsarit 90+2'	Stadium: Thai Army Sports Stadium; Referee: Preecha Kangram

18 April 2010	TTM Phichit	3–0	Pattaya United	Phichit
	Kraikitti 13'; Roland V. 18'; Patrick S. 62'			Stadium: Phichit Stadium; Referee: Chaiya Mahapab

25 April 2010	Pattaya United	3–3	Buriram PEA	Pattaya
				Stadium: Nongprue Municipality Football Field

25 April 2010	Pattaya United	1–1	Bangkok Glass	Pattaya
	Jérémy 46'; Athanase (red card) 59'		Sutee 85'	Stadium: Nongprue Municipality Football Field; Referee: Surasak Kundiloksirodom

9 May 2010	Bangkok United	0 – 1	Pattaya United	Bangkok
			Jérémy 13'	Stadium: Thai-Japanese Stadium; Referee: Preecha Kangram

15 May 2010	Pattaya United	0–0	Osotspa Saraburi	Pattaya
				Stadium: Nongprue Municipality Football Field

23 May 2010	Pattaya United	2–0	Samut Songkhram	Pattaya
				Stadium: Nongprue Municipality Football Field

29 May 2010	TOT-CAT	1–3	Pattaya United	Nonthaburi
				Stadium: Yamaha Stadium (Thailand); Referee: Sura Sriart

6 June 2010	Muangthong United	1–0	Pattaya United	Nonthaburi Province
	Dagno 75' (pen.)		Sompob (red card) 73'	Stadium: Yamaha Stadium (Thailand); Referee: Apisit Aonrak

12 June 2010	Pattaya United	2–0	Police United	Pattaya
				Stadium: Pattaya Stadium

20 June 2010	Thai Port	2–0	Pattaya United	Bangkok
				Stadium: PAT Stadium

27 June 2010	BEC Tero Sasana	2–3	Pattaya United	Bangkok
				Stadium: Thephasadin Stadium

3 July 2010	Sisaket	1–1	Pattaya United	Sisaket
				Stadium: Sri Nakhon Lamduan Stadium

17 July 2010	Pattaya United	1–0	TOT-CAT	Pattaya
				Stadium: Pattaya Stadium

25 July 2010	Rajnavy Rayong	1–1	Pattaya United	Rayong
				Stadium: Rayong Stadium

28 July 2010	Chonburi	2–2	Pattaya United	Chonburi
				Stadium: IPE Chonburi Stadium

7 August 2010	Pattaya United	1–0	Royal Thai Army	Pattaya
				Stadium: Pattaya Stadium

15 August 2010	Pattaya United	4–1	TTM Phichit	Pattaya
				Stadium: Pattaya Stadium

18 August 2010	Buriram PEA	3–1	Pattaya United	Buriram
				Stadium: i-mobile Stadium

21 August 2010	Bangkok Glass	3–1	Pattaya United	Pathumthani
				Stadium: Leo Stadium

12 September 2010	Osotspa Saraburi	0–0	Pattaya United	Saraburi
				Stadium: M-150 Saraburi Stadium

19 September 2010	Samut Songkhram	2–0	Pattaya United	Samut Songkhram
				Stadium: Samut Songkhram Stadium

26 September 2010	Pattaya United	2–2	Muangthong United	Pattaya
				Stadium: Pattaya Stadium

29 September 2010	Police United	2–2	Pattaya United	Pathumthani
				Stadium: Thammasat Stadium

2 October 2010	Pattaya United	0–1	Thai Port	Pattaya
				Stadium: Nongprue Municipality Football Field

10 October 2010	Pattaya United	1–2	Bangkok United	Pattaya
				Stadium: Nongprue Municipality Football Field

17 October 2010	Pattaya United	3–1	BEC Tero Sasana	Pattaya
18.00 UTC+7				Stadium: Nongprue Municipality Football Field; Referee: Prathan Nasawang

17 October 2010	Pattaya United	2–1	Sisaket Muang-Thai	Pattaya
16.30 UTC+7				Stadium: Nongprue Municipality Football Field; Referee: Surachai Kulaho

=== FA Cup ===
==== Third round ====
23 June 2010	Thai Port	2–3	Pattaya United	Bangkok
				Stadium: PAT Stadium

==== Fourth round ====
11 August 2010	Pattaya United	1–0	Osotspa Saraburi	Pattaya
				Stadium: Pattaya Stadium

==== Quarter-finals ====
15 September 2010	Pattaya United	0–2	Chonburi	Pattaya
				Stadium: Pattaya Stadium

=== League Cup ===
==== First round ====
===== 1st leg =====
28 August 2010	Uthai Thani Forest	2–3	Pattaya United	Uthai Thani
				Stadium: Uthai Thani Stadium

===== 2nd leg =====
1 September 2010	Pattaya United	1–1	Uthai Thani Forest	Pattaya
				Stadium: Pattaya Stadium

==== Second round ====
===== 1st leg =====
8 September 2010	Chiangrai United	1–1	Pattaya United	Chiangrai
				Stadium: Chiangrai Stadium

===== 2nd leg =====
13 October 2010	Pattaya United	1–0	Chiangrai United	Pattaya
				Stadium: Pattaya Stadium

==== Third round ====
===== 1st leg =====
20 October 2010	Thai Honda	1–4	Pattaya United	Bangkok
				Stadium: KMITL Sport center football stadium

===== 2nd leg =====
27 October 2010	Pattaya United	v	Thai Honda	Pattaya
				Stadium: Pattaya Stadium

== League table ==
Pos	Team	Pld	W	D	L	GF	GA	GD	Pts
4	Thai Port	30	13	9	8	41	29	+12	48
5	Bangkok Glass	30	12	9	9	48	38	+10	45
6	Pattaya United	30	12	9	9	43	38	+5	45
7	Osotspa M-150 Saraburi	30	10	12	8	32	30	+2	42
8	Samut Songkhram	30	11	9	10	27	32	−5	42

Updated to match(es) played on 24 October 2010. Source: FIFA.com
Rules for classification: 1st points; 2nd head-to-head; 3rd match win; 4th goal difference; 5th number of goals scored

== Queen's Cup ==
6 February 2010	Pattaya United	1 – 0	Air Force United	Chonburi
18:30 UTC+7	Ludovick 81'			Stadium: Nongprue Municipality Stadium

8 February 2010	Pattaya United	2 – 0	Raj Pracha-Nonthaburi	Chonburi
18:30 UTC+7	Patiphon 34'; Tana 71'			Stadium: Nongprue Municipality Stadium

10 February 2010	BEC Tero Sasana	3 – 2	Pattaya United	Chonburi
18:30 UTC+7	Christian 35'; Narej 60'; Anon B. 83'		Ludovick 72', 89'	Stadium: Nongprue Municipality Stadium

13 February 2010	Rajnavy Rayong	2 – 2 (a.e.t.) (10 – 9 p)	Pattaya United	Rayong Stadium, Rayong
18:00 UTC+7	Suttinan 46', 56'	Report	Patiphon 25'; Ludovick 50'
