= List of foreign Thai League 1 players =

This is a list of foreign players in the Thai League 1, which commenced play in 1996.

The List includes players from 1996 to 2025–26. Players of the current season are also included. All following players have played at least one Thai League game.

- National flag before the name: players who have represented their national football senior team in FIFA International Match and have at least one international appearance cap.
- In bold: players who have played at least one Thai League game in the current season (2025–26), and are still at the clubs for which they have played. This does not include current players of a Thai League club who have not played a Thai League game in the current season.
- As for dual citizen, nationality is listed under official registration.
- The list of players by country is sorted by the year of transfer in.
- The country that has more than 20 players played in Thai League will be categorized by year of transfer in.

== Heritage Players ==
- (Australia) Maxx Creevey – Buriram United, Police Tero, Nakhon Pathom United, Rayong – 2020–2026
- (Australia) Patrick Bentley – Port – 2017
- (Australia) (Scotland) **Kenny Dougall** – **Buriram United** – 2024–
- (Australia) (Greece) Alexander Gountounas – Uthai Thani – 2024–2025
- (Australia) Aaron Gurd – Kanchanaburi Power – 2025–2026
- (Cyprus) Charalampos Charalampous – Uthai Thani, Buriram United, Nakhon Ratchasima – 2023–2026
- (Denmark) Bill Sida – Nakhon Ratchasima, Bangkok Glass – 2015–2017
- (Denmark) **Jonathan Khemdee** – **Ratchaburi** – 2023–
- (Denmark) **Lennard Wurster** – **Ratchaburi** – 2025–
- (Denmark) **Phon-Ek Jensen** – Suphanburi, **PT Prachuap** – 2022, 2024–
- (Denmark) Sammy Slot – Port – 2018
- (England) Caelan Tanadon Ryan – Buriram United, Port – 2024, 2025
- (England) Danai James Smart – Uthai Thani – 2024–2026
- (England) **James Beresford** – Uthai Thani, **Bangkok United** – 2023–
- (England) James Falconer – Muangthong United – 2025–2026
- (England) **Leon James** – Ratchaburi Mitr Phol, Sukhothai, Nongbua Pitchaya, Buriram United, Chonburi, Uthai Thani, Nakhon Ratchasima, **BG Pathum United** – 2020–
- (England) Naruphon Putsorn – Bangkok United, Songkhla United, BBCU, Buriram United, Suphanburi, Nakhon Ratchasima – 2013–2019
- (England) **Nathan James** – **BG Pathum United** – 2025–
- (England) Siam Yapp – Police Tero, Buriram United, Nakhon Ratchasima, Uthai Thani – 2021–2025
- (France) **Chakkit Laptrakul** – BG Pathum United, Samut Prakan City, Buriram United, PT Prachuap, Uthai Thani, **Ayutthaya United** – 2018, 2020–
- (France) (Laos) **Hugo Boutsingkham** – **Port** – 2025–
- (France) **Nont Muangngam** – Chiangrai United, Police Tero, Chiangmai, Chiangmai United, **Lamphun Warriors** – 2016–2020, 2021–
- (France) **Thanawat Suengchitthawon** – Muangthong United, **Ratchaburi** – 2023–
- (France) Tristan Do – BEC Tero Sasana, Muangthong United, Bangkok United – 2014–2026
- (Germany) Alexander Sieghart – Buriram United, Bangkok United, Police Tero – 2016–2022
- (Germany) David Wilhelmsen – Ubon United – 2017
- (Germany) Dennis Buschening – Buriram United, BEC Tero Sasana, Army United, Navy, Chainat Hornbill – 2013–2016, 2019
- (Germany) Jack Krause – Sukhothai – 2019
- (Germany) Jonas Josaran Schwabe – Uthai Thani, Lamphun Warriors – 2024–2025, 2026
- (Germany) Kritsana Pummarrin – Kanchanaburi Power – 2025–2026
- (Germany) **Manuel Bihr** – Bangkok United, **Port** – 2016–
- (Germany) Maximilian Steinbauer – Muangthong United, Sukhothai – 2022–2023
- (Germany) **Nalu Jandke** – **Sukhothai** – 2025–
- (Germany) Philip Roller – Ratchaburi Mitr Phol, Port - 2017–2023
- (Germany) Yayar Kunath – Nakhon Ratchasima – 2018–2019
- (Germany) Philip Frey – Bangkok United – 2024–2025
- (Germany) Sumethee Khokpho – Port, Kanchanaburi Power – 2025–2026
- (Ghana) Jakkapong Polmart – Sukhothai – 2023–2024
- (Italy) **Gionata Verzura** – Osotspa, Ubon UMT United, Ratchaburi Mitr Phol, Chiangmai, **Chiangrai United** – 2013, 2017–
- (Italy) **Marco Ballini** – Chainat Hornbill, Muangthong United, **Chiangrai United**, BG Pathum United – 2018–
- (Japan) **Shunta Hasegawa** – **Bangkok United** – 2024–
- (Malaysia) Muhammatsapwan Klipkaeo – Uthai Thani – 2024
- (Morocco) **Oussama Thiangkham** – **PT Prachuap** – 2025–
- (Netherlands) Delvin Pinheiro Frederico – Buriram United, Chainat Hornbill – 2017–2018
- (Netherlands) Ronan Pluijnen – Muangthong United – 2022–2023
- (Netherlands) Phumin William Boers – Khonkaen United – 2024
- (Nigeria) **Wichan In-Aram** – **Bangkok United** – 2024–
- (Norway) Athit Berg – Nakhon Pathom United, Buriram United, Port – 2023–2026
- (Norway) Håvar Dahl – Nakhon Pathom United – 2024
- (Senegal) Saranyu Plangwal – PT Prachuap – 2024–2025
- (Singapore) (England) **Ben Davis** – Port, Chonburi, **Uthai Thani** – 2022–
- (Spain) Ernesto Amantegui – Buriram United, Army United, Bangkok United, Port, Muangthong United, Samut Prakan City, BG Pathum United, Police Tero, Khonkaen United, Nakhon Pathom United – 2013–2025
- (Sweden) Adisak Seebunmee – Uthai Thani, Sukhothai – 2023–2025
- (Sweden) Anthonio Sanjairag – Chonburi, Uthai Thani, Nakhon Ratchasima – 2021–2025
- (Sweden) August Gustafsson Lohaprasert – Buriram United, Army United – 2014–2015
- (Sweden) **Elias Dolah** – Port, **Buriram United**, BG Pathum United – 2017–2023, 2025–
- (Sweden) Gustav Sahlin – Port – 2022–2024
- (Sweden) **Kevin Deeromram** – Ratchaburi Mitr Phol, Port, **Ratchaburi(2)** – 2017–
- (Sweden) (France) Kevin Sangsamanan – Buriram United, Chiang Rai United – 2018–2019
- (Sweden) Niran Hansson – Port, Police Tero, Chonburi, Buriram United, Nongbua Pitchaya – 2017–2023
- (Sweden) Oliver Granberg – Muangthong United, Nakhon Ratchasima – 2022–2023
- (Sweden) Oscar Kahl – Bangkok United, Rayong – 2017–2019, 2020
- (Sweden) **Patrik Gustavsson** – **BG Pathum United** – 2022–2024, 2025–
- (Sweden) Robin Holm – Bangkok Glass 2018
- (Sweden) **William Weidersjö** – Port, **Uthai Thani** – 2022–
- (Sweden) Kristoffer Ryberg – Uthai Thani – 2025–2026
- (Switzerland) Charyl Chappuis – Buriram United, Suphanburi, Muangthong United, Port – 2013–2023
- (Switzerland) (Laos) Chitchanok Xaysensourinthone – Buriram United, Muangthong United, BEC Tero Sasana, PTT Rayong, Suphanburi, Nakhon Ratchasima, BG Pathum United, Chiangrai United – 2012–2017, 2019–2022, 2024–2025
- (Switzerland) Denis Darbellay – Police Tero, Uthai Thani, Nakhon Ratchasima – 2019–2025
- (Switzerland) Peter Läng – Bangkok Glass – 2010–2013
- (Switzerland) Yannick Nussbaum – Sukhothai – 2025
- (United States) Anthony Ampaipitakwong – Buriram United, Bangkok United – 2012–2021
- (United States) Sujinda Dangvan – BEC Tero Sasana, Ubon United, BEC Tero Sasana – 2012–2018
- (United States) Samuel McAlpine – Port – 2023–2024
- (United States) Parkin Harape – Police Tero, Rayong – 2023-2024, 2025–2026
- (United States) Micah Duchowny – Buriram United – 2024
- (United States) Jonah Duchowny – Buriram United – 2024
- (Wales) Mika Chunuonsee – Muangthong United, BEC Tero Sasana, Suphanburi, Bangkok United, Lamphun Warriors – 2009–2024

== Afghanistan ==
- (Afghanistan) Faysal Shayesteh – Songkhla United – 2014
- (Afghanistan) Mustafa Azadzoy – Chiangrai United, Chiangmai, Trat – 2017, 2019, 2020–2021

== Algeria ==
- (Algeria) Khaled Kharroubi – BEC Tero Sasana, Osotspa Saraburi – 2011–12
- Otman Djellilahine – BEC Tero Sasana – 2014
- Mehdi Terki – Ratchaburi – 2023–2024
- (Algeria) Mehdi Tahrat – Kanchanaburi Power – 2025–2026

== Angola ==
- Altino Brandão – Stock Exchange of Thailand – 1996
- (Angola) Aguinaldo – Ubon UMT United – 2018

== Argentina ==
- Raúl Gastón González – Sriracha – 2009
- Lucas Daniel Echenique – Sriracha, Samutsongkhram, Sisaket – 2011–2014
- Daniel Blanco – Army United – 2012–2014
- Leandro Torres – Buriram United – 2014
- Leonel Altobelli – Buriram United – 2014
- German Pacheco – Ratchaburi – 2016
- Mariano Berriex – Ubon UMT United, Sisaket – 2017
- Nicolás Vélez – Suphanburi – 2017
- Bernardo Cuesta – Buriram United – 2020
- Joel López Pissano – BG Pathum United – 2025

== Armenia ==
- (Armenia) Edgar Manucharyan – Ratchaburi – 2017

== Australia ==
- Aleksandar Jovanović – BEC Tero Sasana – 2012
- Danny Invincibile – Army United – 2012–2013
- (Australia) Paul Reid – Police United – 2012
- Goran Šubara – Bangkok Glass – 2013
- Kyle Nix – Chiangrai United – 2013
- Rocky Visconte – Suphanburi – 2013
- (Australia) Erik Paartalu – Muangthong United – 2014
- (Australia) Brent McGrath – Sisaket, Port – 2014–2015
- (Australia) Matt Thompson – PTT Rayong – 2014
- (Australia) Michael Beauchamp – PTT Rayong – 2014
- Trent McClenahan – PTT Rayong – 2014
- Francesco Stella – Sisaket – 2015
- (Australia) Matt Smith – Bangkok Glass – 2015–2018
- Michael Cvetkovski – Navy – 2015
- (Australia) Mark Bridge – Chiangrai United – 2016–2017
- Henrique Andrade Silva – Chiangrai United – 2017
- Isaka Cernak – Sisaket – 2017
- (Australia) Eli Babalj – Chainat Hornbill – 2019
- (Australia) Brandon O'Neill – Buriram United – 2020–2021
- Anthony Carter – Bangkok United – 2021
- Kwabena Appiah-Kubi – Nakhon Ratchasima – 2021
- Brandon Wilson – Lampang – 2022–2023
- Jordan Murray – Nakhon Ratchasima – 2022–2023
- Nick Ansell – Nakhon Ratchasima – 2024–2025
- (Australia) Terry Antonis – Uthai Thani – 2024–2025
- **Ryan Edwards** – **BG Pathum United** – 2026–

== Austria ==
- (Austria) Roland Linz – Muangthong United – 2013
- Marco Sahanek – Nakhon Ratchasima – 2021
- Armin Gremsl – Muangthong United – 2025–2026
- (Austria) **Peter Žulj** – **Buriram United** – 2025–
- **Robert Žulj** – **Buriram United** – 2025–

== Azerbaijan ==
- (Azerbaijan) Ramil Sheydayev – Buriram United – 2023–2024

== Bahrain ==
- (Bahrain) Jaycee John Okwunwanne – Bangkok United, Air Force Central, Chonburi – 2015–18, 2019, 2020-2021

== Belgium ==
- (Belgium) Marvin Ogunjimi – Ratchaburi – 2016

== Bolivia ==
- Roland Vargas-Aguilera – TTM Phichit – 2010
- (Bolivia) Edivaldo Hermoza – Muangthong United – 2012–13
- (Bolivia) Jhasmani Campos – Bangkok Glass – 2017
- (Bolivia) **Leonardo Justiniano** – **Rayong** – 2026–

== Brazil ==
=== 2007 ===
- Ney Fabiano – Thailand Tobacco Monopoly, Chonburi, Bangkok Glass, Wuachon United, Suphanburi – 2007–08, 2010–13

=== 2009 ===
- Aron da Silva – Chula United, Sriracha, Songkhla United, Army United, Osotspa, Navy – 2009–2016
- Diego Pishinin – Sriracha – 2009, 2011
- Douglas Cobo – Chonburi, Sriracha, BEC Tero Sasana, Khon Kaen United – 2009–11, 2021–2022
- Edvaldo – Thai Port, Chiangrai United – 2009–11
- Mario Caetano Neto– Chula United, BEC Tero Sasana – 2009–10
- Mário Da Silva – Thai Port, Bangkok United – 2009–13
- Paulo Roberto – Pattaya United – 2009
- Richard Falcão – PEA – 2009
- Valci Júnior – TOT, Sisaket, TTM Phichit, Thai Port – 2009–12

=== 2010 ===
- Diego – TTM Phichit, Navy – 2010–11
- Dudu – Buriram PEA, Sriracha, Osotspa Saraburi, Police United – 2010–12, 2014
- Anderson Dos Santos – Buriram United, Chonburi, Suphanburi – 2010–16, 2018–2019
- Douglas – Buriram PEA, Ratchaburi, Saraburi, Ratchaburi – 2010, 2013–15, 2022–2023
- Erikson Noguchipinto – Samut Songkhram – 2010–11, 2014
- Ricardinho – Pattaya United – 2010
- Chayene Santos – Muangthong United, Esan United – 2010, 2012
- Cleiton Silva – Osotspa Saraburi, BEC Tero Sasana, Muangthong United, Chiangrai United, Suphanburi – 2010–13, 2014–16, 2018–19, 2019-20

=== 2011 ===
- Diego Walsh – TOT – 2011–12
- Leandro Assumpção– Chiangrai United, Chonburi, Sisaket, Muangthong United, Air Force Central, Nakhon Ratchasima, Suphanburi – 2011–2021
- Felipe Ferreira – Police United, Navy– 2011–13, 2016
- Alessandro Alves – Army United – 2011–14
- Antônio Cláudio – Chiangrai United – 2011–12
- Cristiano Lopes – Sriracha – 2011
- Leandro Dos Santos – Army United, Police United, Bangkok Glass – 2011–14
- Rafael – Buriram PEA, Bangkok Glass – 2011–12
- Uilian Souza – Chiangrai United – 2011–14
- Leonardo Ferreira – TTM Chiangmai, Chiangrai United – 2011–12
- Antonio Pina – Osotspa Samut Prakan, Pattaya United, Nakhon Ratchasima – 2011, 2016–18

=== 2012 ===
- Daniel Côrtes – Police United – 2012–13
- Victor Amaro – Samut Songkhram, Sisaket – 2012–2016
- Juninho – BBCU, TOT – 2012–13, 2015
- Léonardo – TTM Chiangmai, Chiangrai United – 2012–13
- Amaury Nunes – TOT – 2012
- Paulo Rangel – Muangthong United, Nakhon Ratchasima – 2012–13, 2017–18
- Vítor Huvos – Chainat Hornbill – 2011
- Tony Pinho – Army United, Bangkok United – 2012–13
- Thiago Cunha – Chonburi – 2012–15, 2017

=== 2013 ===
- Gabriel Dos Santos – BEC Tero Sasana – 2013
- Lucas Gaúcho – BEC Tero Sasana – 2013
- Vítor Huvos – Chainat Hornbill – 2013
- Jerri – Chiangrai United – 2013
- Wellington Katzor – Ratchaburi – 2013

=== 2014 ===
- Fernando Abreu – Chiangrai United – 2014–2015
- Raphael Botti – Army United – 2014–16
- Jeferson – Osotspa Samut Prakan – 2014–2016
- Fábio Lopes – Ratchaburi – 2014
- Luizinho – Suphanburi, Army United – 2014
- Lúcio Maranhão – Buriram United – 2014
- Renan Marques – Chiangrai United, Sukhothai, Chonburi, Air Force Central – 2014–2018
- Juliano Mineiro – Chonburi – 2014–15
- Leandro de Oliveira – Singhtarua, Bangkok Glass, Osotspa Samut Prakan – 2014–2015
- Márcio Rosário – Suphanburi – 2014–2016
- **Wellington Priori** – Army United, Pattaya United, Trat, Police Tero, Ayutthaya United, **Chonburi** – 2014, 2017, 2020, 2023–2024, 2025–
- Leandro Tatu – Bangkok United – 2014–2016
- Renan Silva – Songkhla United, Chainat Hornbill – 2014, 2016
- Heberty – Ratchaburi, Muangthong United, Port, Bangkok United – 2014–15, 2017–2023

=== 2015 ===
- Diogo – Buriram United, BG Pathum United – 2015–18, 2020–2022
- Diogo Rangel – Osotspa Samut Prakan – 2015
- Gilberto Macena – Buriram United, Bangkok United – 2015–17
- Jandson – Buriram United, Chiangrai United – 2015, 2017
- Alex Wesley – Chainat Hornbill – 2015–16
- Rodrigo Vergilio – Navy, Chonburi, Chonburi– 2015–
- Vitor Júnior – Navy – 2015, 2018
- André Luís – Suphanburi, Navy, Suphanburi – 2015–18
- Wander Luiz – Ratchaburi – 2015
- Alex Medeiros – Army United – 2015
- Addison Alves – Osotspa Samut Prakan, Navy – 2015–
- Caihame – TOT – 2015
- Bruno Lopes – Ratchaburi – 2015
- Renatinho – Chiangrai United – 2015

=== 2016 ===
- Deivdy Reis – Chainat Hornbill – 2016
- Dennis Murillo – Chiangrai United, Osotspa, PTT Rayong, Nakhon Ratchasima, Chonburi, Lamphun Warrior, Nakhon Ratchasima – 2016, 2019–2026
- Wellington – Chiangrai United – 2016
- Danilo Cirino – Chiangrai United – 2016
- Júnior Negrão – Pattaya United – 2016
- Tinga – Suphanburi – 2016
- Dellatorre– Suphanburi – 2016–2017, 2019
- Josimar – Army United, Port – 2016–2017, 2019
- Kaio Felipe – Buriram United – 2016
- Weslley Feitosa – Buriram United – 2016
- Carlos Santos – Ratchaburi – 2016–2017
- Rodrigo Frauches – Army United – 2016
- Alex Rafael – Sukhothai – 2016
- Chico – Sisaket – 2016

=== 2017 ===
- Jajá – Buriram United, Muangthong United, Chiangrai United – 2017–18, 2020
- Rogérinho – Buriram United – 2017
- **Everton** – Chiangrai United, **Bangkok United** – 2017–
- Felipe Azevedo – Chiangrai United – 2017
- Vander Luiz – Chiangrai United, Bangkok United, PT Prachuap – 2018–2024
- Célio – Muangthong United – 2017
- Tartá – Police Tero – 2017
- Denis Viana – Sisaket – 2017
- Guilherme Moreira – Super Power Samut Prakan – 2017
- Diego Assis – Thai Honda Ladkrabang – 2017–
- Rafinha – Thai Honda Ladkrabang – 2017
- Ricardo Jesus – Thai Honda Ladkrabang – 2017–
- Tiago Chulapa – Ubon UMT United, Rayong, Police Tero – 2017, 2020, 2021
- **Victor Cardozo** – Ubon UMT United, Chiangrai United, PTT Rayong, BG Pathum United, Chiangrai United, BG Pathum United, Lamphun Warriors, **Chiangrai United** – 2017–
- Carlão – Ubon UMT United, Pattaya United, Samut Prakan City– 2017, 2019
- Thiago – Ubon UMT United – 2017
- Rafael Bastos – Buriram United – 2017
- Rodrigo Maranhão – Sukhothai – 2017
- Elizeu – Suphanburi – 2017
- Gustavo Claudio – Thai Honda Ladkrabang – 2017
- Roninho – Thai Honda Ladkrabang – 2017
- Jonatan Reis – PT Prachuap, Suphanburi, Trat, Nongbua Pitchaya – 2017–2019, 2020-2021, 2022

=== 2018 ===
- Robson – Bangkok United– 2018–2019
- Edgar – Buriram United – 2018
- (Brazil) Osvaldo – Buriram United – 2018
- Lukian – Pattaya United, Chonburi – 2018–2019
- Ciro – Chonburi – 2018
- Rafinha – Pattaya United – 2018
- Marcos Vinícius – Police Tero – 2018
- Douglas Tanque – Police Tero – 2018
- Bill – Ratchaburi, Chiangrai United, Lamphun Warriors, Chiangrai United – 2018–2022, 2023–2024
- Felipe Menezes – Ratchaburi – 2018
- Rômulo – Suphanburi, Khonkaen United, Police Tero – 2018, 2022–2023
- Rodrigo Paraná – Ubon UMT United – 2018
- Brinner – Ubon UMT United, Chiangrai United, Lampang, Uthai Thani – 2018-2022, 2023–2024
- William Henrique - Chiangrai United, PT Prachuap, Suphanburi – 2018–2021, 2022
- David Bala - Bangkok Glass, Chiangmai - 2018–19
- Matheus Alves - Chonburi, PT Prachuap, Police Tero- 2018-20

=== 2019 ===
- Dirceu - Ratchaburi - 2019
- Eliandro- Chiangmai, Suphanburi, Chonburi, Samut Prakan City - 2019–2021
- Evson Patrício - Chiangmai, Chiangmai United- 2019, 2021–2022
- Ibson Melo - Samut Prakan City, Sukhothai, Khon Kaen United - 2019–2023
- Ricardo Santos - Chainat Hornbill, Trat, Uthai Thani - 2019–2021, 2023–2025
- **Caíque** - Chiangmai, **Ayutthaya United** - 2019, 2025–
- Júnior Lopes - Chonburi, Trat - 2019–2021
- Bruno Gallo - Muangthong United - 2019
- Derley - Muangthong United, Ratchaburi, PT Prachuap - 2019–2024
- Maurinho - PT Prachuap - 2019, 2022
- Caion - PT Prachuap, Chonburi, Suphanburi, Chonburi - 2019–2021, 2024
- Pedro Júnior - Buriram United, Samut Prakan City - 2019, 2020

=== 2020 ===
- Ricardo Bueno - Buriram United - 2020
- Brenner Marlos - Bangkok United - 2020
- Barros Tardeli - BG Pathum United, Samut Prakan City, Nongbua Pitchaya, Port, PT Prachuap – 2020–2021, 2021–2025
- Mailson - Chiangrai United - 2020
- Willian Popp - Muangthong United - 2020–2022, 2023–2024, 2026
- Lucas Rocha – Muangthong United – 2020–2023
- Tiago Luís - Rayong - 2020
- Evandro Paulista – Sukhothai, Police Tero, Trat, Nakhon Pathom United – 2020, 2021–2022, 2023–2024
- Felipe Amorim - Suphanburi, Chiangrai United, Port - 2020–2023, 2024–2025
- Alef - Suphanburi, Khon Kaen United - 2020–2023
- Bruno Mezenga - PT Prachuap - 2020
- Willen Mota - PT Prachuap, Bangkok United, Port, Lamphun Warriors - 2020–2024, 2025–2026
- Danilo Lopes - Rayong - 2020
- Adalgisio Pitbull - Rayong - 2020
- Digão - Buriram United - 2020-2022
- Maicon - Buriram United – 2020–21
- Samuel Rosa - Buriram United, Samut Prakan City, PT Prachuap – 2020–2024

=== 2021 ===
- **Airton** - Nongbua Pitchaya, Port, **PT Prachuap** - 2021–
- Hamilton Soares - Nongbua Pitchaya, Port - 2021–2024
- **Tauã Ferreira dos Santos** - PT Prachuap, Lamphun Warrior, **PT Prachuap(2)** - 2021–2022, 2023–
- Danilo - Suphanburi, Chonburi, BG Pathum United - 2021–2024
- Getterson- Chiangrai United– 2021–2022
- Rafael Jansen – Ratchaburi – 2021–2023

=== 2022 ===
- Cássio Scheid - BG Pathum United - 2022–2023
- **Conrado** – BG Pathum United, Nongbua Pitchaya, **Ayutthaya United** – 2022, 2024–
- Diego Landis - Chiangrai United, Khonkaen United - 2022–2025
- Olávio - Chiangrai United - 2022
- Andrey Coutinho - Lampang - 2022
- **Deyvison** – Lampang, Nakhon Ratchasima, **Sisaket United** – 2022, 2024–2025, 2026–
- Thiago Mosquito – Lampang – 2022–2023
- Thales Lima – Lamphun Warriors – 2022
- **Jorge Fellipe** – Nongbua Pitchaya, Lampang, Trat, Nongbua Pitchaya(2), **Chonburi** – 2022–
- Negueba – Port, Lamphun Warriors, Ratchaburi – 2022–2026
- Danilo Oliveira – Police Tero – 2022
- Laércio Soldá – Sukhothai – 2022–2024

=== 2023 ===
- Lucca – Lamphun Warriors – 2023
- **Stênio Júnior** – BG Pathum United, Rayong, **Chonburi** – 2023, 2024–
- Wildson Índio – Khonkaen United – 2023
- Luiz Antônio – Lamphun Warriors – 2023
- Crislan – Nakhon Ratchasima – 2023
- Léo – Nongbua Pitchaya – 2023
- Brenner – PT Prachuap, Khonkaen United – 2023–2025
- Rafael Galhardo – Sukhothai – 2023
- Willian Lira – Chonburi – 2023–2024
- Fellipe Veloso – Chiangrai United – 2023–2024
- Murilo Oliveira – Chonburi – 2023–2024

=== 2024 ===
- Lucas Crispim – Buriram United – 2024–2025
- **Guilherme Bissoli** – **Buriram United** – 2024–
- Mateus Lima – Ratchaburi, Sukhothai, Nakhon Ratchasima – 2024, 2026
- Rodriguinho – Chiangrai United – 2024
- Miguel Bianconi – Chiangrai United – 2024
- Jardel Capistrano – Nongbua Pitchaya – 2024
- **Raniel** – **BG Pathum United** – 2024–2025, 2026–
- Valdo – Nakhon Pathom United – 2024–2025
- **Cláudio** – **Sukhothai** – 2024–
- Matheus Vargas – Buriram United – 2024
- Chrigor – Buriram United, Prachuap – 2024–2025
- Jefferson Assis – Lamphun Warriors – 2024–2025
- Júnior Batista – Lamphun Warriors, Rayong – 2024–2025
- **Victor Oliveira** – **Chiangrai United** – 2024–
- Matheus Fornazari – Sukhothai, BG Pathum United – 2024–2026
- Lucas Serafim – Uthai Thani – 2024–2025
- Júlio César – Uthai Thani – 2024–2025
- **Ralph Machado** – Chiangrai United, **Lamphun Warriors** – 2024–
- **Carlos Iury** – **Chiangrai United** – 2024–
- Ricardo Lopes – Lamphun Warriors – 2024
- Diego Silva – Rayong – 2024–2025
- Júlio César – Chiangrai United – 2024–2025
- Bruno Cantanhede – Rayong – 2024–2025

=== 2025 ===
- Fabinho – Lamphun Warriors – 2025
- Dudu Lima – Nakhon Ratchasima – 2025
- Judivan – Nongbua Pitchaya – 2025
- Tiago Alves – Uthai Thani – 2025
- **Matheus Gustavo** – **Sukhothai** – 2025–
- **Romeu Martins** – **Sukhothai** – 2025–
- **Gildo Henrique** – **Sukhothai** – 2025–
- **Philipe Maia** – **Bangkok United** – 2025–
- Elias – Sukhothai – 2025
- **Michel** – **PT Prachuap** – 2025–
- Ewerton – Kanchanaburi Power – 2025–2026
- Matheus Pato – Port – 2025
- **Matheus Lins** – **Port** – 2025–
- Queven – Chonburi – 2025–2026
- **João Afonso** – **Rayong** – 2025–
- **Dudu Silva** – **Chiangrai United** – 2025–
- **Hélio** – **Chiangrai United** – 2025–
- Wendel Matheus – Nakhon Ratchasima – 2025–2026
- **Gabriel Henrique** – **Chiangrai United** – 2025–
- Batata – Muangthong United – 2025
- **Kaká Mendes** – **Port** – 2025–
- **Diego Carioca** – **Ayutthaya United** – 2025–
- Bruno Baio – Uthai Thani – 2025–2026
- Sidcley – Ratchaburi – 2025–2026
- **Lucas Tocantins** – **Port** – 2025–
- Rodrigo Dias – PT Prachuap – 2025
- Brandao de Souza – Nakhon Ratchasima – 2025
- **Denílson** – **Ratchaburi** – 2025–
- **Bernardo Vilar** – **PT Prachuap** – 2025–

=== 2026 ===
- **Eduardo Mancha** – **Buriram United** – 2026–
- Leonardo Kalil – Port – 2026
- Leandro Ribeiro – Uthai Thani – 2026
- **Kelvin** – **Uthai Thani** – 2026–
- **Rivaldinho** – **Bangkok United** – 2026–
- **Barreto** – **Sukhothai** – 2026–
- **Gleyson Oliveira** – **Ratchaburi** – 2026–
- **Arthur Moura** – **Bangkok United** – 2026–
- Weslen Júnior – Rayong – 2026
- **Bruno Moreira** – **Port** – 2026–
- **João Magno** – **BG Pathum United** – 2026–
- **Ruan Ribeiro** – **Port** – 2026–
- **Felipe Nunes** – **Pattani** – 2026–
- **Carlos Neto** – **Pattani** – 2026–
- **Marlon Silva** – **Pattani** – 2026–
- **Marcel Scalese** – **Port** – 2026–

== Brunei Darussalam ==
- (Brunei) **Faiq Bolkiah** - Chonburi FC, **Ratchaburi** - 2021–

== Bulgaria ==
- Gerasim Zakov – Sisaket – 2015
- Lyuben Nikolov – Sisaket, Super Power Samut Prakan – 2015–2017
- Stefan Tsonkov – Muangthong United – 2025–2026

== Burkina Faso ==
- Valéry Sanou – Muangthong United, Sriracha – 2009

== Cambodia ==
- (Cambodia) Khim Borey – Sisaket – 2011
- (Cambodia) Chrerng Polroth – Buriram United – 2019
- (Cambodia) **Nick Taylor** – **PT Prachuap** – 2025–
- (Cambodia) Takaki Ose – BG Pathum United – 2025–2026

== Cameroon ==
- Eric Kamdem Kamdem – BEC Tero Sasana – 2004
- Jules Baga – Chonburi, Songkhla United, Chainat Hornbill – 2006–2008, 2010–2011, 2012–2014
- Michel Charlin Tcheumaleu – Osotspa, Samut Songkhram – 2007–2009
- Bangnolac Jean Franklin – Port Authority, BEC Tero Sasana – 2008–2009
- Djanal Herve Pierre – Customs Department, Samut Songkhram, Bangkok Glass – 2008–2009, 2012
- Eric Fotou Kamdem – BEC Tero Sasana – 2008
- Mballa Zambo – Samut Songkhram – 2008
- Moudourou Moise – Thai Port, Chainat Hornbill – 2009–2010, 2012
- Paul Ekollo – TTM Samut Sakhon, Bangkok Glass, Pattaya United, Bangkok United – 2009–2013
- Ulrich Munze – Thai Port, Esan United – 2009–2012
- Berlin Ndebe-Nlome – Chonburi – 2010–2011
- Ludovick Takam – Pattaya United, Chonburi, Police United – 2010–2013
- Njie Ngenevu Divine – Sisaket, Samut Songkhram, Suphanburi – 2010–2014
- Clarence Bitang – Buriram PEA, Chainat Hornbill – 2011–2012
- Franck Ohandza – Buriram PEA – 2011–2012
- Florent Obama – Buriram PEA, Chainat Hornbill – 2011–2013
- Theodore Yuyun – Osotspa Saraburi – 2011–2012
- Yves Ekwalla Herman – Buriram United – 2011–2012
- John Mary – Buriram United – 2012
- (Cameroon) Matthew Mbuta – Army United – 2012
- Valery Hiek – Bangkok Glass, Chainat Hornbill – 2012–2014
- Yannick Ossok – Police United – 2012
- Christ Mbondi – Bangkok Glass – 2013
- Elvis Job – Songkhla United – 2013
- Mbengono Yannick – Chainat Hornbill – 2013
- William Modibo – Osotspa Saraburi – 2014
- David Bayiha – Navy, Sukhothai– 2015–16
- Dooh Moukoko – BBCU – 2016
- Marcel Essombé – Ratchaburi – 2017
- (Cameroon) Jean-Claude Billong – Muangthong United – 2023–2024
- Yannick M'Boné – Chonburi – 2023–2024

== Canada ==
- Anthony Adur – TOT FC – 2010–2012
- (Canada) Dave Simpson – Chonburi – 2010
- (Canada) Marcus Haber – Nongbua Pitchaya – 2024–2025
- (Canada) Keven Alemán – Rayong – 2025–2026
- (Canada) **Stefan Cebara** – **Rayong** – 2025–

== Cape Verde ==
- (Cape Verde) Alvin Fortes – Ratchaburi, Nongbua Pitchaya, Ratchaburi – 2022–2023

== Central African Republic ==
- (Central African Republic) Franklin Anzité – Samut Songkhram – 2014

== Chile ==
- Nelson San Martín – Bangkok Glass – 2009
- Ramsés Bustos – Buriram United, Super Power Samut Prakan – 2013, 2017

== China ==
- Guo Tianyu – Chiangrai United – 2024–2025

== Colombia ==
- Jhon Obregón – Ratchaburi – 2013
- Frank Castañeda – Buriram United – 2022
- Jonathan Agudelo – Uthai Thani – 2024
- Brayan Perea – Port – 2025–2026
- Jork Becerra – Nakhon Ratchasima – 2026
- Estefano Arango – Chonburi – 2026

== Congo DR ==
- (Democratic Republic of the Congo) Belux Bukasa Kasongo – BEC Tero Sasana – 2013–14
- (Democratic Republic of the Congo) Joël Sami – Ratchaburi, Sukhothai – 2017–18, 2019–2020
- (Democratic Republic of the Congo) **Jonathan Bolingi** – Buriram United, **Chonburi** – 2021–2023, 2025–

== Congo Republic ==
- (Republic of the Congo) Juvhel Tsoumou – Police Tero – 2024

== Costa Rica ==
- (Costa Rica) César Elizondo – Buriram United – 2013
- José Luis Cordero – Ratchaburi – 2013
- (Costa Rica) José Mena – Bangkok Glass – 2013–2014
- (Costa Rica) Ariel Rodríguez – Bangkok Glass, PTT Rayong – 2016–2017, 2018–2019
- (Costa Rica) Diego Madrigal – Suphanburi – 2017
- Freddy Álvarez – BG Pathum United – 2023–2025
- (Costa Rica) Felicio Brown – Muangthong United – 2024

== Croatia ==
- Ante Rožić – Suphanburi – 2013
- Antun Palić – Bangkok United – 2014
- Aleksandar Kapisoda – Air Force Central – 2018
- Renato Kelić – Buriram United, Chonburi, BG Pathum United – 2020–2023
- Josip Ivančić – Lampang – 2023
- Denis Bušnja – BG Pathum United, Muangthong United – 2024
- Andrija Filipović – PT Prachuap – 2025

== Curaçao ==
- (Curaçao) Shelton Martis – Osotspa Saraburi – 2014
- (Curaçao) Prince Rajcomar – BEC Tero Sasana – 2015
- (Curaçao) Richairo Živković – Bangkok United – 2024–2025

== Denmark ==
- Henrik Jørgensen – Raj Pracha – 1996–97
- Sebastian Svärd – Songkhla United – 2014
- (Denmark) **Lucas Andersen** – **BG Pathum United** – 2026–

== Egypt ==
- Islam Mohamed Zaky – Thailand Tobacco Monopoly, Osotspa Saraburi – 2008, 2010
- Ahmed Shamsaldin – Nakhon Pathom United – 2025

== El Salvador ==
- (El Salvador) Christian Castillo – Suphanburi – 2013
- (El Salvador) Nelson Bonilla – Sukhothai, Bangkok United, Port, Chiangrai United, Sukhothai – 2018–2022, 2023–2024
- (El Salvador) Irvin Herrera – Sukhothai – 2019
- (El Salvador) Léster Blanco – Sukhothai – 2022

== England ==
- Chris Brandon – BEC Tero Sasana – 2011
- (England) Robbie Fowler – Muangthong United – 2011
- Romone Rose – Muangthong United – 2011
- Bas Savage – TOT – 2012–2015
- (England) Jay Bothroyd – Muangthong United – 2014
- Jay Simpson – Buriram United – 2014
- Lee Tuck – Air Force Central, Nakhon Ratchasima – 2014–2015
- Rohan Ricketts – PTT Rayong – 2014
- Leroy Lita – Sisaket – 2017
- Jay Emmanuel-Thomas – PTT Rayong – 2019
- Adam Mitter – Rayong – 2020
- **Charlie Clough** – Nakhon Ratchasima, Port, **Lamphun Warriors** – 2021–2024, 2025–
- (England) Andros Townsend – Kanchanaburi Power – 2025–2026

== Equatorial Guinea ==
- (Equatorial Guinea) Thierry Fidjeu – Singhtarua – 2014

== Estonia ==
- (Estonia) Henri Anier – Muangthong United – 2021–2023

== Finland ==
- (Finland) Toni Kallio – Muangthong United – 2011

== France ==
- David Le Bras – BEC Tero Sasana, Chonburi – 2007–2008
- Christian Nadé – Samut Songkhram – 2011–2013
- Flavien Michelini – Bangkok Glass, Ratchaburi – 2011–2015
- Geoffrey Doumeng – Chonburi – 2011–2012
- Goran Jerković – Buriram United, Bangkok Glass, Army United – 2012–2014
- Anthony Moura-Komenan – Osotspa Samut Prakan – 2012–2017
- Antonin Trilles – Bangkok United – 2013–2014
- Jonathan Béhé – BEC Tero Sasana – 2013
- Jonathan Matijas – Songkhla United – 2013
- Michaël Murcy – Police United, Chainat Hornbill – 2013–2015
- Romain Gasmi – Bangkok United, Bangkok Glass – 2013–2015, 2016
- (France) Florent Sinama Pongolle – Chainat – 2016, 2018
- Michaël N'dri – Muangthong United, Police Tero – 2016–2018
- Yohan Tavares – Bangkok United – 2017
- Greg Houla – Air Force United, Police Tero, Nakhon Ratchasima, Chonburi – 2018, 2020, 2024–2025
- Jean-Philippe Mendy – PT Prachuap – 2019
- Lossémy Karaboué – Ratchaburi, Suphanburi, PT Prachuap, Khon Kaen United – 2019–2025
- Simon Dia – Ratchaburi – 2021
- (France) Aly Cissokho – Lamphun Warriors, Muangthong United – 2022–2026
- Amadou Soukouna – Bangkok United – 2023–2024
- Clément Depres – Ratchaburi – 2024–2025
- **Gabriel Mutombo** – **Ratchaburi** – 2024–2026
- Seydine N'Diaye – BG Pathum United – 2024, 2025
- Ottman Dadoune – Ratchaburi – 2025
- Romain Habran – PT Prachuap – 2025
- **Anthony Belmonte** – **BG Pathum United** – 2026–

== Georgia ==
- Giorgi Tsimakuridze – TOT, TTM Chiangmai, Bangkok Glass – 2010, 2012
- Zourab Tsiskaridze – Bangkok Glass – 2014
- Nika Sandokhadze – BG Pathum United – 2025–2026

== Germany ==
- Sasa Disic – Pattaya United – 2009–2010
- Björn Lindemann – Army United, Suphanburi, Nakhon Ratchasima, Navy, Sisaket – 2012–2017
- Chinedu Ede – Bangkok United – 2017
- Kenan Dünnwald-Turan – Muangthong United – 2025
- Robert Bauer – Buriram United – 2025
- **Dominik Schad – Lamphun Warriors** – 2025–

== Ghana ==
- Owusu Hayford – Nakhon Pathom – 2007–2008
- Victor Mensah – PEA – 2008–2009
- Christian Egba – Osotspa Saraburi, Port – 2009–2010
- Evans Mensah – Osotspa – 2009–2011
- Emmanuel Frimpong - Sisaket - 2010-2011
- (Ghana) Frank Acheampong – Buriram United – 2011–2013
- (Ghana) James Dissiramah – Sisaket – 2011
- (Ghana) Gilbert Koomson – BEC Tero Sasana, Samut Songkhram – 2012–2015
- Isaac Honny – BEC Tero Sasana, Samut Songkhram, Air Force Central, Police Tero, Port – 2013–14, 2020–2025
- (Ghana) Dominic Adiyiah – Nakhon Ratchasima – 2015–2018
- Prince Amponsah – Chonburi – 2016–2018
- Kwame Karikari – Nakhon Ratchasima, Police Tero, Nakhon Pathom United — 2021–22, 2023–2024
- Lesley Ablorh – Police Tero, Nakhon Pathom, Chonburi — 2021–2025
- **Richmond Darko** – **Chonburi** – 2026–

== Guadeloupe ==
- (Guadeloupe) Thomas Gamiette – BEC Tero Sasana – 2014

== Guam ==
- (Guam) Brandon McDonald – Chainat Hornbill – 2015

== Guinea ==
- (Guinea) Aly Camara – Royal Thai Army, TTM Samut Sakhon – 2006–09
- Sylla Moussa – Royal Thai Army, Muangthong United, BBCU – 2006–12
- (Guinea) Lonsana Doumbouya – Prachuap, Trat, Buriram United, Port – 2018–2019, 2022–2025
- (Guinea) Mohamed Mara – Ratchaburi, Kanchanaburi Power – 2024, 2025–2026
- (Guinea) Yasser Baldé – Ratchaburi – 2024

== Guinea-Bissau ==
- (Guinea-Bissau) Frédéric Mendy – Bangkok Glass – 2018
- (Guinea-Bissau) Romário Baldé – Ratchaburi – 2022
- (Guinea-Bissau) Marcelo Djaló – Buriram United, Uthai Thani – 2024–2026
- (Guinea-Bissau) Steve Ambri – Khonkaen United – 2024

== Guyana ==
- (Guyana) Morgan Ferrier – Nakhon Ratchasima – 2022–23

== Haiti ==
- (Haiti) Pascal Millien – Samut Songkhram – 2014
- (Haiti) Yves Desmarets – PTT Rayong – 2014

== Honduras ==
- (Honduras) Georgie Welcome – BEC Tero Sasana, Navy – 2014–15

== Hungary ==
- Norbert Csiki – Sisaket – 2016

== Iceland ==
- (Iceland) Sölvi Ottesen – Buriram United – 2017

== Indonesia ==
- (Indonesia) Greg Nwokolo – Chiangrai United, BEC Tero Sasana – 2012, 2015–2016
- (Indonesia) Victor Igbonefo – Chiangrai United, Osotspa Samut Prakan, Navy, Nakhon Ratchasima, PTT Rayong– 2012, 2015–2017, 2019
- (Indonesia) Irfan Bachdim – Chonburi – 2013
- (Indonesia) Sergio van Dijk – Suphanburi – 2014–2015
- (Indonesia) Terens Puhiri – Port – 2018
- (Indonesia) Yanto Basna – Sukhothai, PT Prachuap(1), PT Prachuap(2) – 2019–2021, 2024
- (Indonesia) Ronaldo Kwateh – Muangthong United – 2024
- (Indonesia) **Asnawi Mangkualam** – **Port** – 2024–
- Meshaal Hamzah – Nakhon Pathom United – 2025
- (Indonesia) **Pratama Arhan** – **Bangkok United** – 2025–
- (Indonesia) **Sandy Walsh** – **Buriram United** – 2025–
- (Indonesia) Shayne Pattynama – Buriram United – 2025

== Iran ==
- Sayed Mirshad – TOT – 2001–2003
- (Iran) Mohsen Bayatinia – Sisaket – 2015
- (Iran) Mehrdad Pooladi – Bangkok United – 2017–18
- Hamed Bakhtiari – Suphanburi – 2021
- Mahan Rahmani – Nongbua Pitchaya – 2021
- Amirali Chegini – Nakhon Pathom United, PT Prachuap – 2023–2025
- Behnam Habibi – Nakhon Pathom United – 2024–2025
- Amir Hossein Nemati – Nakhon Pathom United – 2025

== Iraq ==
- (Iraq) Hussein Alaa Hussein – Bangkok United – 2013
- (Iraq) **Rebin Sulaka** – Buriram United, **Port** – 2021–2023, 2025–
- (Iraq) Frans Putros — Port — 2022–2025
- (Iraq) Jiloan Hamad — Uthai Thani — 2023–2024

== Ireland ==
- (Republic of Ireland) Niall Quinn – BEC Tero Sasana – 2004
- Billy Mehmet – Bangkok Glass – 2013
- (Republic of Ireland) Andy Keogh – Ratchaburi – 2015

== Israel ==
- Miki Siroshtein – Suphanburi – 2019
- Gidi Kanyuk – Buriram United, Nakhon Ratchasima, Chonburi – 2020-2022
- Lidor Cohen – Nongbua Pitchaya, BG Pathum United, Khonkaen United, Trat – 2021–2024
- Ben Azubel – BG Pathum United, Trat – 2023, 2024

== Italy ==
- Nicolao Cardoso – Buriram United – 2023
- Martin Boakye – Buriram United – 2025

== Ivory Coast ==
- Mohamed Koné – Krung Thai Bank, Chonburi, Muangthong United, TOT – 2003–2007, 2009–2014
- (Ivory Coast) Kafoumba Coulibaly – Chonburi, BEC Tero Sasana – 2004–2007
- Hervé Kambou – BEC Tero Sasana – 2005–2007
- Hamed Koné – Chonburi – 2005–2009
- (Ivory Coast) Badra Ali Sangaré – Chonburi, BEC Tero Sasana – 2006–2008
- Fodé Diakité – Chonburi, Pattaya United, BEC Tero Sasana – 2006, 2008, 2012–2015, 2017
- Kassim Koné – Osotspa, Krung Thai Bank, Bangkok Glass – 2006–2010
- Goore Landry Romeo – Chonburi, Thai Honda – 2006–2007
- Bamba Gaoussou – Suphanburi, Osotspa, BEC Tero Sasana – 2007–2009
- Bireme Diouf – Samut Songkhram, Muangthong United, Chonburi, Suphanburi, Saraburi, Sukhothai, Chainat Hornbill, Trat – 2007–2009, 2010–2019
- Henri Jöel – PEA, Buriram PEA, Ratchaburi – 2007–2010, 2013–2015
- Kignelman Athanase – Royal Thai Navy, Pattaya United – 2007, 2009
- Kouadio Pascal – TOT, Buriram PEA, Esan United – 2008–2010, 2012
- Jean-Baptiste Akassou – BEC Tero Sasana – 2008–2009
- Dango Siaka – Muangthong United – 2009–2014
- Yaya Soumahoro – Muangthong United – 2009–2010
- Jacques Tioye – Bangkok United – 2009
- Abdoul Coulibaly – Muangthong United – 2010
- Christian Kouakou – Muangthong United – 2010–12
- Koné Seydou – Buriram PEA, Songkhla United, Samut Songkhram – 2010, 2012–2014
- Diarra Ali – Muangthong United, Port, BBCU – 2011, 2015–2016
- Marc Landry Babo – Samutsongkhram, Police Tero(1), Police Tero(2) – 2013, 2020, 2022–2024
- Amadou Ouattara – PTT Rayong, Navy, Nakhon Ratchasima, Chonburi– 2014, 2018–2024
- Kouassi Yao Hermann – Air Force Central – 2014
- Bernard Doumbia – Saraburi, Chainat Hornbill, Nakhon Ratchasima – 2015, 2018-2019
- Yannick Boli – Ratchaburi, Port, Chiangmai United – 2019–2022
- (Ivory Coast) Giovanni Sio – Ratchaburi – 2023

== Jamaica ==
- (Jamaica) Richard Langley – Pattaya United – 2010–11

== Japan ==
=== 2007 ===
- Masahiro Fukasawa – Bangkok University, Bangkok United – 2007, 2010

=== 2008 ===
- Masao Kiba – Customs Department – 2008
- Ryuji Sueoka – Bangkok University – 2008

=== 2009 ===
- Hironori Saruta – Sriracha, Bangkok Glass, Port, Chiangrai United – 2009–2016
- Yoshiaki Maruyama – Chonburi, Thai Port – 2009–2010

=== 2010 ===
- Hiroshi Morita – Thai Port – 2010
- Hiroyuki Yamamoto – TTM Phichit, Pattaya United – 2010–2011
- Isao Kubota – Samut Songkhram – 2010
- Keisuke Ogawa – Pattaya United, Chiangrai United – 2010–2012, 2014
- Kunihiko Takizawa – Bangkok Glass – 2010–2011
- Nobuyuki Zaizen – Muangthong United, BEC Tero Sasana – 2010–2011
- Takahiro Kawamura – Police United, TOT, BEC Tero Sasana – 2010–2015, 2016

=== 2011 ===
- Hiromichi Katano – Osotspa Saraburi, Sukhothai, Rayong – 2011–2014, 2016–2017, 2024–2025
- Kazuto Kushida – Chonburi, Chainat Hornbill – 2011–2016, 2020
- Kazuya Myodo – Pattaya United – 2011
- Yuya Iwadate – TTM Phichit – 2011

=== 2012 ===
- Ryuki Kozawa – Pattaya United – 2012
- Yusuke Kato – BEC Tero Sasana, Samut Songkhram – 2012, 2014

=== 2013 ===
- Kai Hirano – Buriram United, Army United – 2013–2014, 2015–2016
- Kazuki Murakami – Chiangrai United, Chainat Hornbill – 2013–2016, 2019
- Shinnosuke Honda – Bangkok Glass – 2013
- Sho Shimoji – BEC Tero Sasana, Chainat Hornbill – 2013–2014, 2016
- Suguru Hashimoto – Osotspa Saraburi – 2013

=== 2014 ===
- (Japan) Daiki Iwamasa – BEC Tero Sasana – 2014
- Genki Nagasato – Ratchaburi, Port – 2014–2015, 2017
- Goshi Okubo – Bangkok Glass, Rayong – 2014–2015, 2020–2021
- Hayato Hashimoto – Chonburi – 2014
- Keita Sugimoto – Chiangrai United – 2014–2015
- Robert Cullen – Suphanburi – 2014
- (Japan) Norihiro Nishi – Police United – 2014
- Terukazu Tanaka – Sisaket – 2014
- (Japan) Teruyuki Moniwa – Bangkok Glass – 2014
- Yuji Funayama – Army United – 2014
- Yuki Bamba - Chonburi, Trat, BG Pathum United, Lampang - 2014, 2019–2020, 2022–2023
- Yutaka Tahara – Samut Songkhram – 2014

=== 2015 ===
- Jun Marques Davidson – Navy – 2015
- Naoaki Aoyama – Muangthong United – 2015–2018
- Satoshi Nagano – Nakhon Ratchasima – 2015–2016

=== 2016 ===
- Takuya Murayama – Ratchaburi – 2016
- Yukiya Sugita – Pattaya United – 2016

=== 2017 ===
- Jurato Ikeda – Bangkok Glass – 2017
- Kenta Yamazaki – Ubon UMT United – 2017
- Michitaka Akimoto – Thai Honda Ladkrabang – 2017
- Ryotaro Nakano – Chonburi – 2017
- Tatsuro Inui – Thai Honda Ladkrabang – 2017
- Yusei Ogasawara – Sisaket – 2017

=== 2018 ===
- Takafumi Akahoshi – Ratchaburi, Suphanburi – 2018

=== 2019 ===
- (Japan) Hajime Hosogai - Buriram United, Bangkok United - 2019-2021
- (Japan) Mike Havenaar - Bangkok United - 2019
- Ryutaro Karube - Chainat Hornbill, Suphanburi - 2019-2020

=== 2020 ===
- Mitsuru Maruoka - BG Pathum United - 2020-2021
- (Japan) Tatsuya Sakai - Samut Prakan City - 2020
- Yuto Ono - Samut Prakan City - 2020-2022

=== 2021 ===
- Daisuke Sakai - Samut Prakan City — 2021–2022
- Kohei Kato – Chiangrai United – 2021–2022
- Ryo Matsumura - BG Pathum United, Police Tero — 2021–2022
- Shintaro Shimizu – Nakhon Ratchasima – 2021–2022
- Sergio Escudero - Chiangmai United — 2021–2022

=== 2022 ===
- Ryohei Arai – Sukhothai — 2022–2024

=== 2023 ===
- **Noboru Shimura** – **Port** — 2023–
- Ryuji Hirota – Chiangrai United – 2023
- Taku Ito – Nakhon Pathom United — 2023–2025
- Yusuke Maruhashi – BG Pathum United – 2023

=== 2024 ===
- Daizo Horikoshi – Trat – 2024
- **Eito Ishimoto** – **Sukhothai** — 2024–
- (Japan) Gakuto Notsuda – BG Pathum United – 2024–2026
- Hikaru Matsui – Sukhothai — 2024–2025
- Kotaro Omori – Muangthong United – 2024
- Reon Saito – Sukhothai — 2024
- **Ryoma Ito** – Rayong, **Chonburi** — 2024–
- Shunya Suganuma – Khonkaen United — 2024, 2025
- (Japan) Tatsuya Tanaka – Ratchaburi – 2024–2025

=== 2025 ===
- **Hirotaka Mita** – Nakhon Ratchasima, **Ayutthaya United** – 2025–
- **Itsuki Enomoto** – **Chiangrai United** – 2025–
- Seia Kunori – Bangkok United – 2025–2026
- **Tomoyuki Doi** – **BG Pathum United** – 2025–
- Riku Matsuda – BG Pathum United – 2025–2026

=== 2026 ===
- Yoshiaki Takagi – BG Pathum United – 2026
- **Koki Tsukagawa** – **PT Prachuap** – 2026–
- Yuki Kusano – Nakhon Ratchasima – 2026
- **Takahiro Yanagi** – **BG Pathum United** – 2026–

== Jordan ==
- (Jordan) Rajaei Ayed – Ratchaburi – 2021–2022

== Kenya ==
- (Kenya) Ayub Masika – Buriram United - 2021–2022
- (Kenya) Eric Johana Omondi – Muangthong United - 2022–2023

== Kosovo ==
- Bajram Nebihi – Ubon UMT United, Chiangrai United, Chonburi – 2017–2018

== Kyrgyzstan ==
- (Kyrgyzstan) Anton Zemlianukhin – Sisaket, Sukhothai – 2016 –2017

== Lebanon ==
- (Lebanon) Soony Saad – Pattaya United, PT Prachuap – 2016, 2021–2022
- (Lebanon) Bassel Jradi – Bangkok United – 2023–2025

== Laos ==
- (Laos) Lamnao Singto – PEA – 2009
- (Laos) Ketsada Souksavanh – Super Power Samut Prakan – 2017
- (Laos) Soukaphone Vongchiengkham – Chainat Hornbill, Prachuap – 2019–20
- (Laos) Outthilath Nammakhoth – Rayong – 2020
- (Laos) Phoutthasay Khochalern – Samut Prakan – 2021
- (Laos) Phoutthavong Sangvilay – BG Pathum United – 2025–2026

== Lithuania ==
- (Lithuania) Nerijus Valskis – Ratchaburi – 2018

== Luxembourg ==
- (Luxembourg) Gerson Rodrigues – Kanchanaburi Power – 2025–2026

== Madagascar ==
- (Madagascar) Guy Hubert – BEC Tero Sasana, Samut Songkhram, Saraburi – 2008–2010, 2013–2015
- (Madagascar) Dimitri Carlos Zozimar – BEC Tero Sasana – 2009
- (Madagascar) Jhon Baggio – Sukhothai – 2016–2021, 2023–2026
- (Madagascar) **Njiva Rakotoharimalala** – Sukhothai, **Ratchaburi** – 2018, 2023–
- (Madagascar) Ibrahim Amada – Ratchaburi – 2024

== Malaysia ==
- (Malaysia) Shahrel Fikri – Nakhon Ratchasima – 2018
- (Malaysia) Kiko Insa – Bangkok Glass – 2018
- (Malaysia) Curran Singh Ferns – Sukhothai – 2018–2019
- (Malaysia) Dominic Tan – Police Tero – 2019–2021
- (Malaysia) Mohamadou Sumareh – Police Tero – 2020
- (Malaysia) Norshahrul Idlan Talaha – BG Pathum United – 2020
- (Malaysia) Junior Eldstål – Chonburi, PT Prachuap – 2021-2022, 2023
- (Malaysia) Liridon Krasniqi – Khonkaen United – 2022
- (Malaysia) Dion Cools – Buriram United – 2023–2025
- (Malaysia) Safawi Rasid – Ratchaburi – 2023
- (Malaysia) Fergus Tierney – Nakhon Pathom United – 2025
- (Malaysia) Muhammad Khalil – Nakhon Pathom United – 2025
- (Malaysia) **Sergio Aguero** – Kanchanaburi Power, 2026–
- (Malaysia) **Daniel Ting** – **Ratchaburi** – 2026–
- (Malaysia) **Quentin Cheng** – **Uthai Thani** – 2026–

== Mali ==
- (Mali) Kalifa Cissé – Bangkok United, Bangkok Glass, Police Tero – 2014–17
- (Mali) Modibo Maïga – Buriram United - 2019
- Moussa Sidibé – Ratchaburi - 2023

== Martinique ==
- (Martinique) Steeven Langil – Ratchaburi, Khonkaen United(1), Khonkaen United(2) – 2019–2022, 2023–2024, 2025
- (Martinique) Jérémy Corinus – Ratchaburi – 2025

== Mauritania ==
- (Mauritania) Aboubakar Kamara – Kanchanaburi Power – 2025–2026

== Montenegro ==
- Dejan Vukadinović – Chainat Hornbill – 2012
- (Montenegro) Đorđije Ćetković – Buriram United – 2012
- (Montenegro) Marko Ćetković – Buriram United – 2012
- Bojan Božović – Chainat Hornbill – 2013
- (Montenegro) Dragan Bošković – Suphanburi, Bangkok United, Port, Chonburi, Police Tero – 2013–2019, 2020–2021
- Ivan Bošković – Chonburi, BEC Tero Sasana, Sisaket – 2013–2014, 2015–2016
- (Montenegro) Andrija Delibašić – Ratchaburi – 2014
- (Montenegro) Radomir Đalović – BEC Tero Sasana – 2014
- (Montenegro) Nikola Nikezić – Chainat Hornbill – 2014
- Admir Adrović – Sukhothai – 2017
- Adnan Orahovac - Prachuap – 2018–2022
- Petar Orlandić –Sukhothai– 2019
- (Montenegro) Filip Stojković – Buriram United – 2025
- Miloš Drinčić – BG Pathum United – 2025
- Srdjan Krstovic – Uthai Thani – 2025
- (Montenegro) Nebojša Kosović – Bangkok United – 2026

== Morocco ==
- (Morocco) Alharbi El Jadeyaoui – Ratchaburi – 2017
- Anass Ahannach – Muangthong United – 2025–2026

== Myanmar ==
- (Myanmar) Myo Hlaing Win – Singha-Thamrongthai – 1996
- (Myanmar) Than Toe Aung – Singha-Thamrongthai – 1996
- (Myanmar) Than Wai – Singha-Thamrongthai – 1996
- (Myanmar) Aung Tan Tan – Port F.C. – 1996
- Aung Kai – Stock Exchange of Thailand Football Club – 1996
- (Myanmar) Kyaw Ko Ko – Chiangrai United, Samut Prakan City, Sukhothai– 2018–2020
- (Myanmar) Nanda Lin Kyaw Chit – PT Prachuap – 2018
- (Myanmar) Aung Thu – Police Tero, Muangthong United, Buriram United, Lamphun Warriors, Uthai Thani – 2018–2019, 2020–2025
- (Myanmar) Thein Than Win – Ratchaburi Mitr Phol – 2019
- (Myanmar) Zaw Min Tun – Chonburi, Sukhothai, Chonburi, Nakhon Pathom United – 2019–2021, 2022, 2023–2024
- (Myanmar) Sithu Aung – Chonburi – 2019
- (Myanmar) Aung Kaung Mann – Trat, Uthai Thani – 2020, 2023
- (Myanmar) Suan Lam Mang – Trat – 2020
- (Myanmar) Hlaing Bo Bo – Sukhothai – 2021
- (Myanmar) Maung Maung Lwin – Lamphun Warriors – 2022–2025
- (Myanmar) Hein Phyo Win – Ratchaburi, Nakhon Ratchasima – 2022–2024, 2025–2026
- (Myanmar) Myo Min Latt – Ratchaburi – 2022–2023
- (Myanmar) Lwin Moe Aung – Rayong – 2024–2025
- (Myanmar) **Win Naing Tun** – **Chiangrai United** – 2024–
- (Myanmar) Soe Moe Kyaw – Uthai Thani – 2025–2026

== Namibia ==
- (Namibia) Lazarus Kaimbi – Osotspa Saraburi, Bangkok Glass, Chiangrai United, Suphanburi – 2011–17
- (Namibia) Tangeni Shipahu – Osotspa Saraburi, Army United – 2012–15
- (Namibia) Sadney Urikhob – Saraburi, Super Power Samut Prakan, Police Tero – 2015–17

== Netherlands ==
- Randy Rustenberg – Pattaya United – 2011
- Adnan Barakat – Muangthong United, Army United, Songkhla United – 2012–14
- Mitchell Kappenberg – Chiangrai United – 2013
- Rutger Worm – Chiangrai United – 2013
- Melvin de Leeuw – Army United, Chiangmai United – 2015, 2021–2022
- Luciano Dompig – TOT – 2015
- Sylvano Comvalius – Suphanburi – 2018
- Leandro Resida – Chainat Hornbill, Rayong – 2019–2020
- Nacer Barazite – Buriram United – 2019
- **Oege-Sietse van Lingen** – **Chonburi** – 2025–
- Ilias Alhaft – Bangkok United – 2025–2026

== Nepal ==
- (Nepal) Upendra Man Singh – Singha-Thamrongthai – 1996

== New Zealand ==
- (New Zealand) Kayne Vincent – Songkhla United, Buriram United, Port – 2014–15

== Niger ==
- (Niger) Issoufou Boubacar Garba – Muangthong United – 2011
- (Niger) Abdoul Aziz Hamza – BEC Tero Sasana – 2006–08

== Nigeria ==
- Jacob Aikhionbare – Thai Port, BBCU – 2008–12
- Samuel Ajayi – Bangkok Glass, Chonburi, Samut Songkhram – 2008–14
- (Nigeria) Patrick Sunday – TTM Phichit – 2010
- Efe Jerry Obode – Pattaya United, Samut Songkhram – 2010–11, 2013
- (Nigeria) Binawari Williams Ajuwa – BEC Tero Sasana – 2011
- Ekele Udojoh – BEC Tero Sasana – 2011
- O. J. Obatola – Pattaya United, Osotspa Samut Prakan, Sisaket – 2011–12, 2015
- (Nigeria) Ikechukwu Kalu – Singhtarua – 2014
- (Nigeria) Kelechi Osunwa – BEC Tero Sasana – 2014
- Adefolarin Durosinmi – Sisaket, Navy, Trat, Chonburi, Nakhon Pathom United – 2015–17, 2019–2021, 2023–2024
- Marco Tagbajumi – Nakhon Ratchasima – 2016
- Raphael Success – Police Tero – 2022
- Ibrahim Tomiwa – PT Prachuap – 2023
- Chigozie Mbah – Uthai Thani – 2023–2024, 2025
- Samuel Nnamani – Nakhon Pathom United – 2023–2024
- Nelson Orji – Muangthong United – 2025–2026

== North Korea ==
- (North Korea) Ri Myong-jun – Thai Port – 2012
- (North Korea) Choe Kum-Chol – Muangthong United – 2012
- (North Korea) Pak Nam-chol – Muangthong United, Sisaket – 2013–14
- (North Korea) Ri Kwang-chon – Muangthong United – 2012–14

== North Macedonia ==
- (North Macedonia) Mario Gjurovski – Muangthong United, Bangkok United, Bangkok Glass, Muangthong United – 2012–2019
- (North Macedonia) Muzafer Ejupi – Songkhla United – 2014
- (North Macedonia) Baže Ilijoski – Bangkok Glass – 2014
- (North Macedonia) Borče Manevski – Chainat Hornbill – 2014
- (North Macedonia) Darko Tasevski – Bangkok Glass, Suphanburi – 2014–2016
- (North Macedonia) Krste Velkoski – Nakhon Ratchasima – 2017

== Oman ==
- (Oman) **Muhsen Al-Ghassani** – **Bangkok United** – 2024–
- (Oman) **Issam Al-Sabhi** – **Port** – 2026–

== Pakistan ==
- (Pakistan) Zesh Rehman – Muangthong United – 2011

== Palestine ==
- (Palestine) Jaka Ihbeisheh – Police Tero – 2017
- (Palestine) Matías Jadue – Port – 2017
- (Palestine) Carlos Salom – Bangkok United – 2018–2019
- (Palestine) **Yashir Islame** – Khon Kaen United, Trat, Police Tero, Rayong, **Ayutthaya United** – 2021–2022, 2023–2024, 2025–
- (Palestine) Mahmoud Eid – Nongbua Pitchaya, Bangkok United – 2021–2025
- (Palestine) Islam Batran – Nongbua Pitchaya – 2022–2023
- (Palestine) Tamer Seyam – PT Prachuap – 2023–2024

== Panama ==
- (Panama) Rolando Blackburn – Port – 2019

== Paraguay ==
- Aldo Barreto – BEC Tero Sasana – 2004–05
- Anggello Machuca – BEC Tero Sasana, Navy – 2010–11, 2015–16
- Javier Acuña – Ratchaburi – 2017

== Philippines ==
=== 2013 ===
- (Philippines) Javier Patiño – Buriram United, Ratchaburi, Port – 2013–14, 2018–21

=== 2018 ===
- (Philippines) **Michael Falkesgaard** – Bangkok United, **Port** – 2018–2023, 2025–
- (Philippines) Mark Hartmann – Ubon UMT United, Ratchaburi, Suphanburi, Nakhon Ratchasima – 2018–19
- (Philippines) Hikaru Minegishi – Pattaya United – 2018
- Chima Uzoka – Chainat Hornbill – 2018
- (Philippines) Luke Woodland – Buriram United, Suphanburi, Ratchaburi – 2018, 2020–21

=== 2019 ===
- (Philippines) Marco Casambre – Chainat Hornbill – 2019
- (Philippines) Patrick Deyto – Suphanburi, PT Prachuap, Chonburi – 2019–2022, 2023–2024
- (Philippines) Curt Dizon – Chonburi, Ratchaburi – 2019, 2020–21
- (Philippines) Joshua Grommen – Sukhothai, Khon Kaen United, Uthai Thani – 2019, 2021–2024
- (Philippines) Ángel Guirado – Chonburi – 2019
- (Philippines) Kevin Ingreso – Buriram United, BG Pathum United, Samut Prakan City – 2019–2022
- (Philippines) Amin Nazari – Ratchaburi, PT Prachuap – 2019, 2022
- (Philippines) Manuel Ott – Ratchaburi, Rayong – 2019, 2025–2026
- (Philippines) Stephan Palla – Buriram United – 2019
- (Philippines) Iain Ramsay – Sukhothai, PT Prachuap, Nongbua Pitchaya, Lamphun Warriors – 2019–23
- (Philippines) Adam Reed – Chainat Hornbill, Ratchaburi – 2019, 2022
- (Philippines) Daisuke Sato – Muangthong United, Suphanburi, Ratchaburi – 2019–2022
- (Philippines) Álvaro Silva – Suphanburi, BG Pathum United – 2019–21
- (Philippines) Martin Steuble – Port – 2019–21, 2022–2023

=== 2020 ===
- (Philippines) Amani Aguinaldo – Trat, Nongbua Pitchaya, Nakhon Ratchasima, Trat, Rayong – 2020–2025
- (Philippines) **Justin Baas** – Ratchaburi, **Uthai Thani** – 2020, 2024–
- (Philippines) **Jesse Curran** – Nakhon Ratchasima, Muangthong United, BG Pathum United, Chonburi, **Ratchaburi** – 2020–2021, 2022–
- (Philippines) Carli de Murga – Chonburi – 2020
- (Philippines) OJ Porteria – Ratchaburi – 2020–21
- (Philippines) Patrick Reichelt – Suphanburi, PT Prachuap – 2020–22
- (Philippines) Dennis Villanueva – Nakhon Ratchasima, PT Prachuap, Nakhon Ratchasima, Police Tero – 2020–2024

=== 2021 ===
- (Philippines) Bernd Schipmann – Ratchaburi – 2021–22

=== 2022 ===
- (Philippines) Diego Bardanca – Buriram United, Chonburi, Kanchanaburi Power – 2022–2023, 2025–2026
- (Philippines) Dylan De Bruycker – Nakhon Ratchasima, Ayutthaya United – 2022, 2025
- (Philippines) **Kike Linares** – Lamphun Warrior(1), Lamphun Warrior(2), **Chonburi** – 2022–2023, 2024–
- (Philippines) **Jesper Nyholm** – Muangthong United, **PT Prachuap** – 2022–2023, 2024–

=== 2023 ===
- (Philippines) Kenshiro Daniels – Sukhothai, Nakhon Ratchasima, Lamphun Warrior – 2023, 2024–2025, 2026
- (Philippines) Oskari Kekkonen – Lamphun Warrior – 2023–2026

=== 2024 ===
- (Philippines) **Jefferson Tabinas** – Buriram United, **Chonburi** – 2024–
- (Philippines) **Neil Etheridge** – **Buriram United** – 2024–
- (Philippines) Scott Woods – Muangthong United – 2024
- (Philippines) **John-Patrick Strauß** – Muangthong United, **Bangkok United** – 2024–

=== 2025 ===
- (Philippines) Christian Rontini – Nongbua Pitchaya – 2025
- (Philippines) Simen Lyngbø – Nongbua Pitchaya – 2025
- (Philippines) John Lucero – Rayong, Kanchanaburi Power — 2025–2026
- (Philippines) Michael Kempter – Muangthong United — 2025–2026
- (Philippines) **Adrian Ugelvik** – **PT Prachuap** — 2025–
- (Philippines) **Kevin Ray Mendoza** – **Chonburi** – 2025–

=== 2026 ===
- **Noah Leddel** – **Ayutthaya United** – 2026–

== Poland ==
- Łukasz Gikiewicz – Ratchaburi, BEC Tero Sasana – 2016

== Portugal ==
- Zezinando – Samut Songkhram, Air Force Central – 2011–12, 2014
- Jaime Bragança – Chonburi – 2014
- (Portugal) Yannick Djaló – Ratchaburi – 2016, 2018
- Bruno Moreira – Buriram United – 2016
- **João Paredes** – **Sukhothai** – 2026–

== Romania ==
- Leontin Chițescu – Chiangrai United – 2011

== Russia ==
- Rod Dyachenko – Samut Songkhram, Pattaya United – 2011–14

== Scotland ==
- Stuart Kelly – Khonkaen – 2011
- Steven Robb – Thai Port – 2011–13
- (Scotland) Mark Burchill – Esan United – 2012

== Senegal ==
- Mohamed Moustapha N'diaye – Muangthong United – 2009
- Christian Gomis – BG Pathum United, Uthai Thani – 2024–2026

== Serbia ==
- Vladimir Ribić – Chonburi – 2011
- Zoran Rajović – BEC Tero Sasana – 2011
- Darko Rakočević – Chonburi, Songkhla United – 2011–14
- Rodoljub Paunović – TOT – 2012
- (Serbia) Miloš Bogunović – Bangkok United – 2013–14
- Žarko Jeličić – TOT – 2013
- Nikola Komazec – Suphanburi, Pattaya United F.C. – 2013, 2015
- Milan Bubalo – Muangthong United, Pattaya United F.C., BEC Tero Sasana – 2014, 2015, 2016
- Marko Perović – Chainat Hornbill – 2014
- Predrag Sikimić – Singhtarua – 2014
- Bojan Beljić – BEC Tero Sasana – 2015
- Sreten Sretenović – BEC Tero Sasana – 2016
- Miloš Bosančić – BEC Tero Sasana – 2016
- Bojan Dubajić – Sisaket – 2016
- Miloš Stojanović – Pattaya United – 2017
- (Serbia) Andrija Kaluđerović – Port – 2017
- (Serbia) Aleksandar Jevtić – Pattaya United – 2017
- (Serbia) Marko Šćepović – Buriram United – 2020
- **Goran Čaušić** — **Buriram United** — 2022–2024, 2025–
- Ognjen Mudrinski – Lamphun Warrior – 2022
- (Serbia) Stefan Šćepović – Muangthong United – 2023–2024
- Veljko Filipović — Chiangrai United, Nakhon Pathom United, Rayong — 2023–2025
- Luka Adžić – Bangkok United – 2024–2025
- Borko Duronjić – Uthai Thani – 2024–2025
- Nenad Lalic – Nakhon Ratchasima – 2025–2026
- Dejan Meleg – Nakhon Ratchasima – 2025
- Fejsal Mulić – Buriram United – 2025
- Marko Šarić – Muangthong United – 2026
- **Marko Nikolić** – **BG Pathum United** – 2026–

== Sierra Leone ==
- (Sierra Leone) Ishmail Kamara – Thai Honda – 2007
- Shaka Bangura – Samut Songkhram – 2013

== Singapore ==
- (Singapore) John Wilkinson – Police United – 2011
- (Singapore) Hassan Sunny – Army United – 2015–16
- (Singapore) Zulfahmi Arifin – Chonburi, Suphanburi – 2018,2020
- (Singapore) Gabriel Quak – Navy – 2018
- (Singapore) Baihakki Khaizan – Trat, Prachuap – 2019-2020
- (Singapore) Irfan Fandi – BG Pathum United, Port – 2020–2026
- (Singapore) Izwan Mahbud – Trat, Samut Prakan City – 2020-2021
- (Singapore) Afiq Yunos – Trat – 2020
- (Singapore) **Ikhsan Fandi** – **BG Pathum United**, Ratchaburi – 2021–
- (Singapore) Song Ui-young – Nongbua Pitchaya – 2023
- (Singapore) Ryhan Stewart – BG Pathum United, Kanchanaburi Power – 2023–2024, 2025–2026
- (Singapore) **Harhys Stewart** – Chiangrai United, **Uthai Thani** – 2024–
- (Singapore) Jacob Mahler – Muangthong United – 2024–2025
- (Singapore) **Ilhan Fandi** – BG Pathum United, **Buriram United** – 2024–
- (Singapore) **Jordan Emaviwe** – **Chiangrai United**, BG Pathum United – 2025–
- Bill Mamadou – Nakhon Ratchasima – 2025–2026
- (Singapore) Anumanthan Kumar – Kanchanaburi Power – 2025–2026
- (Singapore) Kyoga Nakamura – Bangkok United – 2025
- Jared Gallagher – Nakhon Ratchasima – 2026

== Slovakia ==
- Miroslav Tóth – TOT, Muangthong United – 2010–11
- Marián Juhás – TOT, Pattaya United – 2010–13
- Peter Ďurica – Sisaket – 2013
- Zdenko Kaprálik – Army United – 2014–15

== Slovenia ==
- Matej Rapnik – Police United – 2014
- Aris Zarifović – Samut Prakan City, Prachuap – 2019–2023
- (Slovenia) Haris Vučkić – Buriram United – 2023–2024

== South Africa ==
- Daniel Mbuizeo – Samut Songkhram – 2010

== South Korea ==
=== 2008 ===
- Won Yoo-hyun – TTM Chiangmai – 2008–12

=== 2010 ===
- Jang Gil-hyeok – Siam Navy, Ratchaburi – 2010, 2013–14
- Jang Gil-yeong – Siam Navy, Bangkok United – 2010-11
- Kim Dae-kyung – Siam Navy – 2010
- Lee Ho-jin – Police United – 2010
- Lee Jung-yong – Sisaket – 2010

=== 2011 ===
- Jung Ho-jin – TTM Phichit, Sisaket, Samut Songkhram – 2011–13
- Lee Gwang-jae – TTM Phichit – 2011
- Shin Young-chol – Siam Navy – 2011
- Lee han-kuk - Police United, Samutsongkhram, TOT S.C. - 2011-2014
- Kim Dong-chan - PTT Rayong, Thai Port - 2011-2012

=== 2012 ===
- (South Korea) Park Jae-hong – Police United – 2012
- Park Jae-hyun – Samut Songkhram – 2012–13
- Jeon Kwang-jin – Chonburi – 2012
- Lee Dong-won – Chainat Hornbill – 2012
- Lee Jun-ki – TOT – 2012–15
- Kim Young-kwang – BBCU – 2012

=== 2013 ===
- (South Korea) Cho Jin-soo – Ratchaburi – 2013
- Bang Seung-hwan – Muangthong United, Air Force Central, Navy – 2013–14, 2017
- Han Jae-woong – Buriram United – 2013
- Jo Tae-keun – Chainat Hornbill – 2013–2016
- Jung Chul-woon – Pattaya United – 2013
- Jung Ji-soo – Pattaya United – 2013
- Jung Myung-oh – Army United, Suphanburi, Sukhothai – 2013–14, 2017–21
- Kim Tae-young – Esan United, Suphanburi, Songkhla United – 2013–14
- Kim Yoo-jin – Muangthong United, Bangkok United – 2013–14
- Kwon Jun – BEC Tero Sasana – 2013

=== 2014 ===
- (South Korea) Kim Dong-jin – Muangthong United – 2014–15
- (South Korea) Lee Sang-ho – Singhtarua – 2014
- (South Korea) Ko Ki-gu – TOT – 2014
- Gong Tae-ha – TOT – 2014
- Joo Sung-hwan – Singhtarua – 2014
- Kim Geun-chul – Singhtarua – 2014
- Kim Tae-min – Police United – 2014
- Kim Tae-yoon – Samut Songkhram – 2014
- Lee Hyun-jin – Chainat Hornbill, Army United – 2014
- Lee Soung-yong – PTT Rayong – 2014
- Lim Hyun-woo – Singhtarua – 2014
- Park Jung-soo – Chainat Hornbill – 2014–15

=== 2015 ===
- (South Korea) Cho Byung-kuk – Chonburi – 2015
- (South Korea) Son Dae-ho – BEC Tero Sasana – 2015
- Go Seul-ki – Buriram United, Port, Chonburi – 2015–17, 2019-2023
- Dai Min-Joo – Saraburi – 2015
- Lee Seung-hee – Suphanburi – 2015
- Lee Ho – Port – 2015

=== 2016 ===
- (South Korea) Kim Jin-kyu – Pattaya United – 2016
- (South Korea) Kim Jung-woo – BEC Tero Sasana – 2016
- Kim Chul-ho – Chonburi – 2016
- Kim Jong-pil – Chonburi – 2016
- Jung Hoon – Suphanburi, PTT Rayong – 2016, 2018–2019
- Woo Geun-jeong – BBCU, Police Tero, PT Prachuap – 2016, 2022–2025
- Ma Sang-hoon – BBCU – 2016
- Kim Seung-yong – Buriram United, Suphanburi – 2016
- Ahn Jae-hoon – Osotspa – 2016
- Yoo Jae-ho – Pattaya United – 2016

=== 2017 ===
- (South Korea) Lee Ho – Muangthong United – 2017-2019
- Kim Tae-yeon – Pattaya United, Samut Prakan City – 2017–2019
- Lee Won-young – Pattaya United – 2017
- Kim Dong-chan – Police Tero – 2017–
- Lee Keon-Pil – Super Power Samut Prakan – 2017

=== 2018 ===
- (South Korea) Lee Yong-rae – Chiangrai United – 2018–20
- Yoo Jun-soo – Buriram United, Ratchaburi Mitr Phol, Prachuap – 2018, 2019–20
- Park Jong-oh – Chainat Hornbill – 2018
- Kim Gyeong-min – Chonburi, Trat – 2018–2019
- Lee Won-jae – Nakhon Ratchasima – 2018–2019
- Lee Jeong-geun – Police Tero – 2018
- Kim Sung-hwan – Port, Suphanburi – 2018–2019
- Kwon Dae-hee – Prachuap, Police Tero, Prachuap – 2018, 2020–2021, 2022–2023
- Kang Soo-il – Ratchaburi, Trat – 2018–2019, 2020

=== 2019 ===
- (South Korea) Park Hyun-beom – Chonburi – 2019
- (South Korea) Oh Ban-suk – Muangthong United – 2019
- Kim Ho-yeong – Samut Prakan City F.C. – 2019
- Kim Pyung-rae – Samut Prakan City F.C. – 2019–

=== 2020 ===
- Yoon Jun-sung – Nakhon Ratchasima – 2020
- Yeo Sung-hae – Ratchaburi, Sukhothai– 2020–2021
- Han Chang-woo – Rayong – 2020
- Park Tae-hyeong – Rayong – 2020
- Jung Jae-yong – Buriram United – 2020
- (South Korea) Lee Jae-sung – Ratchaburi, Muangthong United – 2020–2021, 2024
- Bae Shin-young – Suphanburi – 2020

=== 2021 ===
- Cho Ji-hun – Chiangrai United – 2021–2022
- (South Korea) Yoo Byung-soo – Chonburi – 2021–2023
- Jung Han-cheol – Suphanburi, Khon Kaen United – 2021–2023
- Yang Joon-a – Police Tero – 2021

=== 2022 ===
- Park Jun-Heong – Ratchaburi – 2022–2024
- Kim Ji-min – Chiangrai United, Ratchaburi – 2022–2023, 2024–2025
- Hong Sung-wook – Muangthong United – 2022

=== 2023 ===
- Lim Jae-hyeok – Police Tero – 2023
- Jeong Ho-min – Nongbua Pitchaya – 2023
- (South Korea) Lee Chan-dong – Chonburi – 2023–2024
- Kim Min-hyeok – Buriram United – 2023–2025
- Yun-jae Nam – Uthai Thani – 2023–2024
- Yu Yong-hyeon – Chiangrai United – 2023–2024

=== 2024 ===
- Choi Ho-ju – Police Tero – 2024
- Lee Keun-ho – Trat – 2024
- Lee Ki-joon – Uthai Thani, Chiangrai United – 2024
- Yoo Young-jae – Nongbua Pitchaya – 2024
- (South Korea) Park Jong-woo – Nongbua Pitchaya – 2024–2025
- Lee Jung-moon – Chiangrai United – 2024–2025
- Lee Jong-cheon – Nakhon Ratchasima – 2024–2025
- Ryu Seung-woo – Khonkaen United – 2024–2025
- Lee Sang-jin – Khonkaen United – 2024

=== 2025 ===
- **Lee Seung-won** – **Chiangrai United** – 2025–
- Hwang Myung-hyun – BG Pathum United F.C. – 2025
- Jeon Hae-Min – Rayong – 2025
- Hong Jeong-un – Muangthong United – 2025
- **Hwang Hyun-soo** – **Ayutthaya United** – 2025–
- **Ko Myeong-seok** – **Buriram United** – 2025–
- Kim Dong-su – Muangthong United – 2025–2026

=== 2026 ===
- (South Korea) **Lee Jeong-hyeop** – **PT Prachuap** – 2026–
- (South Korea) **Baek Sung-dong** – **Ayutthaya United** – 2026–

== Spain ==
- José Pedrosa Galán – Chainat Hornbill – 2012
- Arzu – BEC Tero Sasana – 2012–13
- Regino – BEC Tero Sasana – 2012
- Osmar Ibáñez – Buriram United – 2012–13
- Jesús Berrocal – Buriram United – 2013
- Bruno – Buriram United – 2013
- Juan Quero – Buriram United, Chonburi, Ratchaburi – 2013–14
- Carmelo González – Buriram United, Suphanburi – 2013–16
- Albert Manteca – Sisaket – 2014
- Gorka Unda – Sisaket, Port, Chainat Hornbill – 2014–15, 2019–20
- Rafael Wellington – PTT Rayong – 2014
- Aritz Borda – Muangthong United – 2014
- Godwin Antwi – Sisaket – 2014
- Óscar Pérez – Ratchaburi – 2014
- Sergio Suárez – Police United, Port – 2014, 2017–2023
- David Rochela – Buriram United, Port – 2014–15, 2017–2023
- Rufo Sánchez – PTT Rayong – 2014
- Aridane Santana – Bangkok Glass – 2015
- Toti – Bangkok Glass, BG Pathum United, Samut Prakan City – 2015–18, 2020-2021
- Mario Abrante – Muangthong United, Police Tero – 2016–17
- Francisco González – Pattaya United – 2016
- Xisco Jiménez – Muangthong United – 2016–2017
- Tyronne – Nakhon Ratchasima, Ratchaburi – 2022–2023, 2024
- Youssef Ezzejjari – Khonkaen United – 2023
- David Cuerva – Khonkaen United, Rayong – 2024
- **Tana** – **Ratchaburi** – 2024–
- Viti Martínez – Nakhon Ratchasima – 2025
- **Alain Oyarzun** – **Kanchanaburi Power** – 2025–
- Néstor Albiach – Ayutthaya United – 2025
- **Édgar Méndez** – **PT Prachuap** – 2025–
- **Rubén Sánchez** – **Buriram United** – 2026–
- **Roque Mesa** – **Ratchaburi** – 2026–

== Sudan ==
- (Sudan) Abo Eisa – Nongbua Pitchaya, Chonburi – 2024, 2025–2026
- (Sudan) Mohamed Eisa – Uthai Thani – 2025–2026

== Sweden ==
- (Sweden) Olof Hvidén-Watson – Osotspa Saraburi, Siam Navy, Thai Port – 2010–12
- (Sweden) Rasmus Jönsson – Buriram United – 2019
- (Sweden) Osman Sow – Sukhothai – 2022–2023
- (Sweden) Admir Bajrovic – Sukhothai – 2022
- (Sweden) Filip Rogić – Buriram United – 2023
- (Sweden) Sean Sabetkar – PT Prachuap – 2023
- (Sweden) Emil Roback – Muangthong United – 2024–2026

== Switzerland ==
- Oumar Kondé – TOT – 2011
- Damian Bellón – Saraburi – 2015
- Sébastien Wüthrich – Ratchaburi – 2021–2022
- **Martin Angha** – **Uthai Thani** – 2025–

== Syria ==
- Mohamad Al Hasan – Bangkok United – 2013
- Rafael Coelho – Chiangrai United – 2017
- Gilson Santos – Suphanburi – 2017
- Marcelo Xavier – Suphanburi – 2017
- **(Syria) Mohammed Osman – Lamphun Warriors** – 2022–

== Timor-Leste ==
- (Timor-Leste) Émerson – Chiangrai United – 2012

== Trinidad & Tobago ==
- (Trinidad and Tobago) Kendall Jagdeosingh – Chainat Hornbill – 2012–13
- (Trinidad and Tobago) Yohance Marshall – Chainat Hornbill – 2012
- (Trinidad and Tobago) Seon Power – Chainat Hornbill – 2013–14

== Togo ==
- Dosseh Attivi – Sisaket – 2010
- (Togo) Thomas Dossevi – Chonburi – 2012
- (Togo) Mawouna Amevor – Chonburi – 2019
- (Togo) Serge Nyuiadzi – Ratchaburi – 2023
- (Togo) Peniel Mlapa – Port, Lamphun Warriors – 2025–2026

== Uganda ==
- Kayobe Livingstone – Bangkok Bank – 1999–2000
- Arbade Bironze – Nakhon Pathom – 2007–09
- (Uganda) Melvyn Lorenzen – BG Pathum United, Muangthong United – 2024–2026

== Ukraine ==
- Dmitriy Gorbushin – BEC Tero Sasana – 2015

== United States ==
- Jerome Watson – Raj Pracha – 1997
- Devala Gorrick – Pattaya United – 2010

== Uruguay ==
- Yeferson Quintana – BG Pathum United – 2026–

== Uzbekistan ==
- (Uzbekistan) Anvar Rajabov – Buriram United – 2012
- Asqar Jadigerov – Buriram United – 2012
- (Uzbekistan) Artyom Filiposyan – Prachuap – 2019, 2020–21
- (Uzbekistan) Sardor Mirzaev – Muangthong United – 2020-2023
- (Uzbekistan) Akbar Ismatullaev – Buriram United – 2020
- (Uzbekistan) Igor Sergeyev – BG Pathum United – 2023–2024
- (Uzbekistan) Abbos Otakhonov – Muangthong United – 2024–2025

== Venezuela ==
- (Venezuela) Andrés Túñez – Buriram United, BG Pathum United – 2015–2023
- (Venezuela) Jeffren Suarez – Lamphun Warriors — 2022–2023

== Vietnam ==
- (Vietnam) Lương Trung Tuấn – Port Authority – 2004–05
- (Vietnam) Michal Nguyễn – Air Force Central – 2018
- (Vietnam) Hoàng Vũ Samson – Buriram United – 2018
- (Vietnam) Đặng Văn Lâm - Muangthong United - 2019–20
- (Vietnam) Lương Xuân Trường - Buriram United - 2019

== Wales ==
- Michael Byrne – Nakhon Pathom, Chonburi, Bangkok Glass, Chainat Hornbill – 2009–13

== Zambia ==
- (Zambia) Noah Chivuta – Nakhon Ratchasima – 2015–2016

== Zimbabwe ==
- (Zimbabwe) Mike Temwanjera – Bangkok United – 2014
