= 2010 Osotspa Saraburi F.C. season =

Osotspa M-150 Saraburi
2010 season
- Chairman: Thatcharin Osatanukroh
- Manager: Pairoj Borwonwatanadilok
- Thai Premier League: 7th
- FA Cup: Fourth round
- Queen's Cup: Group stage
Home colours	Away colours

The 2010 season was Osotspa Saraburi's 12th season in the top division of Thai football. This article shows statistics of the club's players in the season, and also lists all matches that the club played in the season.

== Chronological list of events ==
- 10 November 2009: The Thai Premier League 2010 season first leg fixtures were announced.
- 11 August 2010: Osotspa Saraburi were knocked out of the FA Cup by Pattaya United in the fourth round.
- 24 October 2010: Osotspa Saraburi finished in 7th place in the Thai Premier League.

== Current squad ==
As of January 25, 2010 Note: Flags indicate national team as defined under FIFA eligibility rules; some limited exceptions apply. Players may hold more than one non-FIFA nationality.

No.	Pos.	Nation	Player
1	GK	THA	Mantehwa Lahmsombat
2	DF	THA	Kosawat Wongwailikit
3	DF	THA	Pratum Chuthong
4	DF	THA	Boonmee Boonrod
5	DF	THA	Siwamet Tanusorn
6	MF	THA	Wanmai Setthanan
7	MF	THA	Kabfah Boonmatoon
8	MF	THA	Sumanya Purisai
9	FW	THA	Kritsada Kemdem
10	MF	THA	Jetsada Puanakunmee
11	MF	SWE	Olof Hvidén-Watson
13	MF	THA	Santitorn Lattirom
14	DF	THA	Apisak Asayut
15	MF	THA	Nahathai Suksombat

No.	Pos.	Nation	Player
18	MF	THA	Apipoo Suntornpanavej
20	MF	THA	Kriengsak Chumpornpong
22	GK	THA	Watchara Buathong
23	FW	THA	Suradetch Thongchai
24	DF	THA	Sakda Fai-in
26	MF	THA	Wisarut Wai-ngan
29	MF	THA	Anirut Suebyim
30	DF	BRA	Roberto Da Silva
31	FW	GHA	Evans Mensah
32	DF	THA	Paitoon Tiepma
33	GK	THA	Chatchai Budprom
34	FW	BRA	Cleiton Silva
35	FW	CMR	Herve Russel

=== Transfers ===
In

Note: Flags indicate national team as defined under FIFA eligibility rules; some limited exceptions apply. Players may hold more than one non-FIFA nationality.

No.	Pos.	Nation	Player
—	MF	THA	Apipoo Suntornpanavej (Transferred from Buriram PEA)
—	DF	THA	Boonmee Boonrod (Transferred from Thai Port FC)
—	GK	THA	Mantehwa Lahmsombat (Transferred from TTM Phichit)
—	DF	THA	Sakda Fai-in (Transferred from Rajdamnern Commercial College)
—	MF	THA	Wisarut Waingan (Transferred from Rajdamnern Commercial College)
—	MF	THA	Santitorn Lattirom (Transferred from Police United FC)
—	MF	NGA	Martin Echeredgor Chidi (Transferred from Lobi Stars F.C.)
—	MF	THA	Kriengsak Chumpornpong (Transferred from Chang Chiangmai RBAC F.C.)
—	MF	THA	Nahathai Suksombat (Transferred from Bangkok Glass FC)

Out

Note: Flags indicate national team as defined under FIFA eligibility rules; some limited exceptions apply. Players may hold more than one non-FIFA nationality.

No.	Pos.	Nation	Player
—	GK	THA	Kittisak Rawangpa (Transferred to Bangkok Glass FC)
—	DF	THA	Phaitoon Thiabma (Transferred to Persijap Jepara)
—	FW	THA	Sarayoot Chaikamdee (Transferred to Thai Port FC)
—	MF	THA	Jakkrit Bunkham (Transferred to Thai Port FC)
—	DF	THA	Thanasith Thong-in (Transferred to Nakhon Pathom FC)
—	FW	THA	Rewat Meerean (Transferred to Raj Pracha-Nonthaburi FC)
—	DF	THA	Tewarit Junsom (Transferred to Chiangrai United)
—	FW	THA	Patiphon Phetwiset (Transferred to Pattaya United)
—	FW	THA	Pravit Wasoontra (Transferred to Chiangmai F.C.)
—	DF	THA	Payungsak Pannarat (Transferred to Police United FC)
—	FW	THA	Rachanon Srinork (Transferred to PTT FC)
—	MF	THA	Pratarn Senala (Transferred to -)
—	DF	THA	Nitipong Limsuwan (Transferred to -)

== League table ==
Pos	Team	Pld	W	D	L	GF	GA	GD	Pts
5	Bangkok Glass	30	12	9	9	48	38	+10	45
6	Pattaya United	30	12	9	9	43	38	+5	45
7	Osotspa M-150 Saraburi	30	10	12	8	32	30	+2	42
8	Samut Songkhram	30	11	9	10	27	32	−5	42
9	BEC Tero Sasana	30	9	8	13	39	42	−3	35

Updated to match(es) played on 24 October 2010. Source: FIFA.com
Rules for classification: 1st points; 2nd head-to-head; 3rd match win; 4th goal difference; 5th number of goals scored

== Results ==
=== Thai Premier League ===
Match results from the 2010 Thai Premier League:

28 March 2010	Osotspa Saraburi	1 - 0	Thai Port	M-150 Saraburi Stadium, Saraburi

6 April 2010	Osotspa Saraburi	1 - 2	Bangkok United	M-150 Saraburi Stadium, Saraburi
				Referee: Preecha Kangram

10 April 2010	BEC Tero Sasana	3 - 1	Osotspa Saraburi	Thephasadin Stadium, Bangkok
				Referee: Prathan Nasawang

25 April 2010	Osotspa Saraburi	1 - 1	TTM Phichit	M-150 Saraburi Stadium, Saraburi
				Referee: Porached Wongkamdee

1 May 2010	Osotspa Saraburi	0 - 1	Royal Thai Army	M-150 Saraburi Stadium, Saraburi
				Referee: Chaiya Mahapab

8 May 2010	Bangkok Glass	0 - 0	Osotspa Saraburi	Thanyaburi
				Stadium: Leo Stadium; Referee: Mongkolchai Pechsri

15 May 2010	Pattaya United	0 - 0	Osotspa Saraburi	Pattaya
				Stadium: Nongprue Municipality Football Field

22 May 2010	Osotspa Saraburi	1 - 0	TOT-CAT	M-150 Saraburi Stadium, Saraburi

28 May 2010	Buriram PEA	2 - 0	Osotspa Saraburi	Buriram
				Stadium: i-mobile Stadium; Referee: Atthakorn Wetchakan

1 June 2010	Samut Songkhram	0 - 1	Osotspa Saraburi	Samut Songkhram Stadium, Samut Songkhram
				Referee: Prathan Nasawang

13 June 2010	Osotspa Saraburi	0 - 3	Muangthong United	Saraburi
				Stadium: M-150 Saraburi Stadium; Referee: Surasak Kundiloksirodom

19 June 2010	Rajnavy Rayong	1 - 2	Osotspa Saraburi	Rayong
				Stadium: Rayong Stadium; Referee: Sura Sriart

27 June 2010	Osotspa Saraburi	2 - 1	Police United	Saraburi
				Stadium: M-150 Saraburi Stadium

4 July 2010	Chonburi	0 - 0	Osotspa Saraburi	Chonburi
				Stadium: IPE Chonburi Stadium; Referee: Atthakorn Wetchakan

17 July 2010	Osotspa Saraburi	0 - 1	Buriram PEA	Saraburi
				Stadium: M-150 Saraburi Stadium; Referee: Prathan Nasawang

25 July 2010	Thai Port	1 - 1	Osotspa Saraburi	Bangkok
				Stadium: PAT Stadium

28 July 2010	Bangkok United	1 - 4	Osotspa Saraburi	Bangkok
				Stadium: Thai-Japanese Stadium; Referee: Thaweep Inkeaw

8 August 2010	Osotspa Saraburi	0 - 0	BEC Tero Sasana	Saraburi
				Stadium: M-150 Saraburi Stadium; Referee: Mongkolchai Pradsri

15 August 2010	Osotspa Saraburi	0 - 0	Samut Songkhram	Saraburi
				Stadium: M-150 Saraburi Stadium; Referee: Surasak Kundiloksirodom

18 August 2010	TTM Phichit	2 - 1	Osotspa Saraburi	Phichit
				Stadium: Phichit Stadium; Referee: Apisit Aonrak

21 August 2010	Royal Thai Army	0 - 1	Osotspa Saraburi	Bangkok
				Stadium: Thai Army Sports Stadium; Referee: Sanid Suksomdao

12 September 2010	Osotspa Saraburi	0 - 0	Pattaya United	Saraburi
				Stadium: M-150 Saraburi Stadium

18 September 2010	TOT-CAT	0 - 0	Osotspa Saraburi	Lak Si
				Stadium: TOT Stadium Chaeng Watthana; Referee: Nattanai Phansupa

25 September 2010	Osotspa Saraburi	6 - 3	Sisaket	Saraburi
				Stadium: M-150 Saraburi Stadium; Referee: Sakda Pansut

29 September 2010	Muangthong United	4 - 1	Osotspa Saraburi	Nonthaburi
				Stadium: Yamaha Stadium (Thailand); Referee: Thanom Burikut

3 October 2010	Osotspa Saraburi	1 - 1	Rajnavy Rayong	Saraburi
16.00 UTC+7	Cleiton Silva 64'		Suttinan N. 76'	Stadium: M-150 Saraburi Stadium; Referee: Thaweechai Sutpattarawan

13 October 2010	Osotspa Saraburi	4 - 1	Bangkok Glass	Saraburi
				Stadium: M-150 Saraburi Stadium; Referee: Prathan Nasawang

17 October 2010	Police United	1 - 2	Osotspa Saraburi	Pathumthani
				Stadium: Thammasat Stadium; Referee: Porached Wongkamdee

24 October 2010	Osotspa Saraburi	1 – 1	Chonburi	Saraburi
16:30 UTC+7	Jetsada 56'		Phaisan (red card) 45'; Cholratit (red card) 55'; Adul Lahso 77'	Stadium: Saraburi Stadium; Referee: Porached Wongkamdee

=== FA Cup ===
==== Third round ====
30 June 2010	TOT-CAT	1 - 1 (4 - 5 p.)	Osotspa Saraburi	Nonthaburi
18.00 UTC+7				Stadium: Yamaha Stadium (Thailand); Referee: Porached Wongkamdee

==== Fourth round ====
11 August 2010	Pattaya United	1 - 0	Osotspa Saraburi	Pattaya
18.00UTC+7				Stadium: Pattaya stadium Referee: Thaweep Inkaew

=== League Cup ===
==== First round ====
===== 1st leg =====
29 August 2010	Phuket	1 - 2	Osotspa Saraburi	Phuket
				Stadium: Phuket stadium

===== 2nd leg =====
1 September 2010	Osotspa Saraburi	3 - 1	Phuket	Saraburi
				Stadium: M-150 Saraburi stadium

==== Second round ====
===== 1st leg =====
15 September 2010	Police United	1 - 1	Osotspa Saraburi	Pathumthani
				Stadium: Thammasat Stadium

===== 2nd leg =====
22 September 2010	Osotspa Saraburi	7 - 3	Police United	Saraburi
				Stadium: M-150 Saraburi stadium

=== Queen's Cup ===
6 February 2010	Osotspa Saraburi	1 – 1	Royal Thai Army	Saraburi
18:30 UTC+7	Wanmai 17'		Bayiha 39'	Stadium: Saraburi Central Stadium

8 February 2010	Osotspa Saraburi	0 – 2	Samut Songkhram	Saraburi
18:30 UTC+7			Pichet 36'; Michel 90+3'	Stadium: Saraburi Central Stadium

10 February 2010	Osotspa Saraburi	1 – 3	Thai Port	Saraburi
18:30 UTC+7	Suradetch 14'		Songsak 10', 30'; Edvaldo 53'	Stadium: Saraburi Central Stadium
