= Eric Kamdem =

Eric Kamdem may refer to:

- Eric Kamdem Kamdem (1983–2009), Cameroonian footballer
- Eric Fotou Kamdem (born 1986), Cameroon-born footballer
