= 2011 Chonburi F.C. season =

Chonburi
2011 season
- Chairman: Wittaya Khunpluem
- Manager: Witthaya Hloagune
- Thai Premier League: 2nd
- Thai FA Cup: Fifth round
- Thai League Cup: Semi-finals
- AFC Cup: Quarter-finals
- Top goalscorer: Pipob (15)

The 2011 season is Chonburi's 6th season in the Thai Premier League of Chonburi Football Club.

== Transfers ==
=== In ===
Date	Pos.	Name	From
2011	DF	(Thailand) Anucha Kitpongsri	(Thailand) Pattaya United
2011	MF	(Thailand) Sarawut Janthapan	(Thailand) Chanthaburi
2011	MF	(Japan) Kazuto Kushida	(Japan) Sagawa Printing
2011	DF	(Japan) Daiki Higuchi	(Japan) Sagawa Printing
2011	DF	(Serbia) Darko Rakočević	(Serbia) Metalac
2011	FW	(Thailand) Anon Budpa	(Thailand) Nonthaburi

- Total spending: ▼ ~ ฿0

=== Out ===
Date	Pos.	Name	To	Fee

- Total income: ▲ ~ ฿0

=== Loans in ===
Date	Pos.	Name	From
2011	FW	(Argentina) Gastón González	(Thailand) Sriracha

=== Loans out ===
Date	Pos.	Name	To
2011	FW	(Canada) Dave Simpson	(Thailand) Samut Songkhram
2011	DF	(Thailand) Noppanon Kachaplayuk	(Thailand) Songkhla

== Matches ==
=== Pre-season ===
7 January 2011	Chonburi	0 – 1	Hoàng Anh Gia Lai	Chonburi
18:00 UTC+7			Evaldo R Goncalves Evaldo 65'	Stadium: IPE Chonburi Stadium

11 January 2011	Sriracha	3 – 1	Chonburi	Chonburi
18:00 UTC+7	González (pen.); Ekkachai		Ney Fabiano	Stadium: Laem Chabang Stadium

15 January 2011	Songkhla	0 – 0	Chonburi	Songkhla
18:00 UTC+7				Stadium: Tinsulanon Stadium

23 January 2011	Chonburi	4 – 2	Singapore Armed Forces	Chonburi
18:00 UTC+7	Therdsak 34'; Adul; Berlin 68', 70'		Goal	Stadium: Chonburi Stadium

11 February 2011	Chonburi	2 – 0	Shonan Bellmare	Chonburi
18:00 UTC+7	Ekaphan 34'; Pipob 63'			Stadium: Chonburi Stadium

=== League table ===
Pos	Team	Pld	W	D	L	GF	GA	GD	Pts	Qualification or relegation
1	Buriram PEA (C)	34	26	7	1	64	15	+49	85	2012 AFC Champions League group stage Group stage
2	Chonburi	34	20	9	5	58	29	+29	69	2012 AFC Champions League Qualifying play-off (Note: Since Buriram PEA also won the 2011 Thai FA Cup, Chonburi qualified for the 2012 AFC Champions League as the league runners-up.)
3	Muangthong United	34	17	9	8	54	32	+22	60	
4	Pattaya United	34	14	11	9	38	27	+11	53 (Note: PAT 2–1 BKG; BKG 0–0 PAT)	
5	Bangkok Glass	34	15	8	11	55	41	+14	53	

Updated to match(es) played on January 28, 2012. Source: Thai Premier League
Rules for classification: 1st points; 2nd head-to-head (only match result, not used aggregate); 3rd match win; 4th goal difference; 5th goals scored.
(C) Champions

==== Results by round ====
Round	1	2	3	4	5	6	7	8	9	10	11	12	13	14	15	16	17	18	19	20	21	22	23	24	25	26	27	28	29	30	31	32	33	34
Ground	H	A	H	A	H	A	H	A	H	H	H	A	H	A	H	A	A	A	H	H	A	H	H	A	A	A	H	A	H	H	A	A	A	H
Result	W	D	W	L	W	W	D	W	W	W	W	D	W	D	D	L	W	W	W	D	L	W	D	L	W	W	W	L	D	W	W	D	W	W
Position	2	1	1	6	2	2																											2	2

A = Away; H = Home; W = Win; D = Draw; L = Loss

=== League ===
19 February 2011	Chonburi	2 – 0	Thai Port	Chonburi
18:00 UTC+7	Pipob 3'; Kushida 72'			Stadium: Chonburi Stadium; Attendance: 6,564; Referee: Preecha Kangram

26 February 2011	Osotspa Saraburi	2 – 2	Chonburi	Saraburi
18:00 UTC+7	Pipat 17'; Anirut 78'		Therdsak 11'; Higuchi 88'	Stadium: Saraburi Stadium; Attendance: 3,825; Referee: Thaweep Inkaew

13 March 2011	Chonburi	6 – 0	TOT	Chonburi
18:00 UTC+7	Therdsak 6', 33'; Adul 17'; Cholratit 21'; Kushida 53'; Berlin 55'			Stadium: Chonburi Stadium; Attendance: 6,404

20 March 2011	Buriram PEA	3 – 0	Chonburi	Buriram
18:00 UTC+7	Ohandza 6', 55'; Jakkraphan 79'			Stadium: i-mobile Stadium; Attendance: 24,712

27 March 2011	Chonburi	2 – 1	TTM Phichit	Chonburi
18:00 UTC+7	Pipob 31'; Natthaphong 46'		Tanat 12'	Stadium: Chonburi Stadium; Referee: Chaiya Mahaprab

3 April 2011	Rajnavy Rayong	0 – 2	Chonburi	Chonburi
18:00 UTC+7				Stadium: IPE Stadium

6 April 2011	Chonburi	2 – 2	Samut Songkhram	Chonburi
18:00 UTC+7				Stadium: Chonburi Stadium

9 April 2011	Sriracha	1 – 2	Chonburi	Chonburi
18:00 UTC+7				Stadium: Suzuki Stadium

17 April 2011	Chonburi	5 – 0	Esan United	Chonburi
18:00 UTC+7				Stadium: Chonburi Stadium

23 April 2011	Chonburi	1 – 0	Chiangrai United	Pathum Thani
18:00 UTC+7				Stadium: Chonburi Stadium

30 April 2011	Chonburi	2 – 0	BEC Tero Sasana	Chonburi
18:00 UTC+7				Stadium: Chonburi Stadium

7 May 2011	Police United	0 – 0	Chonburi	Chonburi
18:00 UTC+7				Stadium: Thammasat Stadium

14 May 2011	Chonburi	6 – 1	Khonkaen	Chonburi
18:00 UTC+7				Stadium: Chonburi Stadium
