= Prawit =

Prawit and Pravit are romanizations of the Thai masculine given names ประวิตร and ประวิทย์ (which are homophones). People with the name include:

- Prawit Wongsuwon, military general and politician
- Prawit Prariwanta, footballer
- Pravit Rojanaphruk, journalist
- Pravit Wasoontra, footballer
- Pravit Suwanwichit, boxer
