= Somchai Singmanee =

Thai footballer

Personal information
- Full name: Somchai Singmanee
- Date of birth: January 20, 1986 (age 40)
- Place of birth: Chanthaburi, Thailand
- Height: 1.69 m (5 ft 6 1/2 in)
- Position: Striker

Team information
- Current team: Lamphun Warrior
- Number: 24

Youth career
- 2005: Chanthaburi

Senior career*
Years	Team	Apps	(Gls)
2006–2007	Chanthaburi	35	(16)
2008–2012	Pattaya United	48	(6)
2012–2013	TOT	11	(0)
2014–2015	Songkhla United	16	(0)
2015	Nakhon Pathom United		
2015–2016	Ayutthaya		
2016	Inter Pattaya		
2017	Phrae United		
2018–	Lamphun Warrior		
- * Club domestic league appearances and goals as of 28 June 2008

Somchai Singmanee (Thai: สมชาย สิงห์มณี; born January 20, 1986) is a Thai professional footballer.
