= Todsapol Karnplook =

Thai footballer (born 1980)

Personal information
- Full name: Todsapol Karnplook
- Date of birth: March 8, 1980 (age 46)
- Place of birth: Sisaket, Thailand
- Height: 1.65 m (5 ft 5 in)
- Positions: Left-back; midfielder

Senior career*
Years	Team	Apps	(Gls)
2003–2008	Thailand Tobacco Monopoly		
2009	Pattaya United		
2010–2013	Sisaket		
2013	Phuket		
2014–2015	Sisaket		
- * Club domestic league appearances and goals as of 28 June 2008

Todsapol Karnplook (Thai ทศพล การปลูก) is a Thai retired footballer.

== Honours ==
- Thailand Premier League 2004/05 championship with Thailand Tobacco Monopoly FC
