= Daniel Mbuizeo =

South African soccer player

Personal information
- Full name: Daniel Mbuizeo Yan Wyk
- Date of birth: 5 May 1983 (age 43)
- Place of birth: Cape Town, South Africa
- Height: 1.74 m (5 ft 8 1/2 in)
- Position: Striker

Team information
- Current team: Samut Songkhram
- Number: 9

Youth career
- Supersport United

Senior career*
Years	Team	Apps	(Gls)
2002	Pirin Blagoevgrad	15	(2)
2010–	Samut Songkhram	1	(0)
- * Club domestic league appearances and goals

Daniel Mbuizeo is a South African footballer, who plays for Thailand Premier League club side Samut Songkhram FC.
