= Rangsarit Sutthisa =

Thai footballer (born 1979)

Personal information
- Full name: Rangsarit Sutthisa
- Date of birth: April 9, 1979 (age 47)
- Place of birth: Maha Sarakham, Thailand
- Height: 1.74 m (5 ft 8 1/2 in)
- Position: Defensive midfielder

Senior career*
Years	Team	Apps	(Gls)
2004–2008	Royal Thai Navy	89	(10)
2009–2013	Pattaya United	68	(0)
2014	Singhtarua	16	(0)
2015–2016	Prachuap	21	(0)
- * Club domestic league appearances and goals as of 28 June 2008

Rangsarit Sutthisa (Thai: รังสฤทธิ์ สุทธิสา, born 9 April 1979) is a Thai former professional footballer.
