= Bangnolac Jean Franklin =

Cameroonian footballer

Jean Banyolag
Personal information
- Full name: Jean Franklin Banyolag
- Date of birth: June 30, 1988 (age 38)
- Place of birth: Yaoundé, Cameroon
- Height: 1.77 m (5 ft 10 in)
- Position: Attacking midfielder

Youth career
- 2007: Kadji Sports Academy

Senior career*
Years	Team	Apps	(Gls)
2008	Port Authority of Thailand FC	21	(2)
2009	BEC Tero Sasana	25	(3)
2010–2012	Yangon United FC		
- * Club domestic league appearances and goals

Jean Franklin Banyolag (born June 30, 1988, in Yaoundé) is a Cameroonian professional footballer who plays as an attacking midfielder.
