= Djanal Herve Pierre =

Cameroonian footballer

Herve Djanal
Personal information
- Full name: Herve Pierre Djanal
- Date of birth: June 3, 1986 (age 40)
- Place of birth: Douala, Cameroon
- Height: 1.82 m (5 ft 11 1/2 in)
- Position: Goalkeeper

Team information
- Current team: Bangkok Glass FC
- Number: 21

Senior career*
Years	Team	Apps	(Gls)
2006–2008	Customs Department	24	(0)
2009	Samut Songkhram	6	(0)
2009–2011	Okkthar United FC	55	(0)
2012	Bangkok Glass FC	8	(0)
- * Club domestic league appearances and goals as of 22 June 2012

Herve Pierre Djanal (born June 3, 1986) is a Cameroonian football goalkeeper, he currently plays for Bangkok Glass FC.

== Career ==
Djanal has played for Thailand Premier League clubside Samut Songkhram.
