= Wirajroj Chanteng =

Thai footballer (born 1981)

Personal information
- Full name: Wirajroj Chanteng
- Date of birth: 14 November 1981 (age 44)
- Place of birth: Chonburi, Thailand
- Height: 1.76 m (5 ft 9 1/2 in)
- Position: Center-back

Youth career
- 2000: Coke-Bangpra

Senior career*
Years	Team	Apps	(Gls)
2001–2002	Coke-Bangpra	21	(2)
2002–2003	Pattaya United	35	(1)
2004–2007	Chonburi	42	(1)
2008–2009	BBCU	57	(3)
2010–2011	Pattaya United		
2012	BBCU		

International career
2005	Thailand	2	(0)
- * Club domestic league appearances and goals as of 28 June 2008

Wirajroj Chanteng (Thai วิราชโรจน์ จันทร์เต็ง ) is a Thai retired footballer.
