= Wanmai Setthanan =

Thai footballer (born 1986)

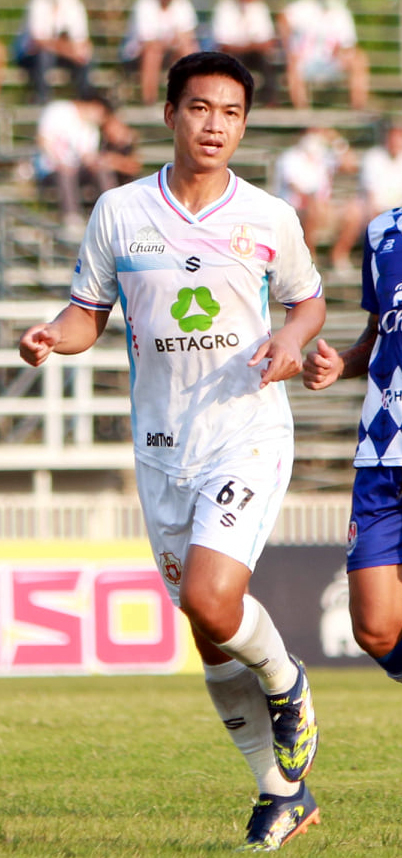
- Wanmai Setthanan playing for Lamphun Warrior.

Personal information
- Full name: Wanmai Setthanan
- Date of birth: 12 January 1986 (age 40)
- Place of birth: Roi Et, Thailand
- Height: 1.75 m (5 ft 9 in)
- Position: Right-back

Team information
- Current team: Navy
- Number: 67

Senior career*
Years	Team	Apps	(Gls)
2013	Sisaket	1	(0)
2014–2017	Osotspa	82	(4)
2018	PT Prachuap	6	(0)
2019	Chiangmai	17	(2)
2020	MOF Customs United	15	(1)
2020–2021	Phrae United	14	(0)
2021–2022	Lamphun Warrior	19	(1)
2022–2024	Pattaya Dolphins United	53	(2)
2025–	Navy	10	(0)
- * Club domestic league appearances and goals as of 20 May 2025

Wanmai Setthanan, (Thai: วันใหม่ เศรษฐนันท์; born 12 January 1986) is a Thai professional footballer who plays as a right-back for Thai League 3 club Navy .

== Honour ==
Lamphun Warriors

- Thai League 2 (1): 2021–22

Pattaya Dolphins United

- Thai League 3 Eastern Region (1): 2022–23
