= Boonmee Boonrod =

Thai footballer (born 1982)

Personal information
- Full name: Boonmee Boonrod
- Date of birth: 10 October 1982 (age 44)
- Place of birth: Surin, Thailand
- Height: 1.77 m (5 ft 9 1/2 in)
- Position: Left back

Team information
- Current team: Lamphun Warrior
- Number: 28

Youth career
- 2005–2006: Osotspa

Senior career*
Years	Team	Apps	(Gls)
2007–2008	Osotsapa	0	(0)
2009	Thai Port	0	(0)
2010–2016	Super Power Samut Prakan	81	(0)
2017	Chiangmai	21	(0)
2017–2018	Phrae United		
2019–	Lamphun Warrior	19	(0)
- * Club domestic league appearances and goals

Boonmee Boonrod (Thai: บุญมี บุญรอด born October 10, 1982), simply known as Mee (Thai: มี) is a Thai professional footballer who plays as a left back for Lamphun Warrior.
