= Mantehwa Lahmsombat =

Thai footballer

Personal information
- Full name: Mantehwa Lahmsombat
- Date of birth: 16 August 1981 (age 45)
- Place of birth: Khon Kaen, Thailand
- Height: 1.80 m (5 ft 11 in)
- Position: Goalkeeper

Senior career*
Years	Team	Apps	(Gls)
2004–2007	Bangkok United	47	(0)
2008	Samutsongkhram	10	(0)
2009	TTM Samut Sakhon	22	(0)
2010	Osotsapa	3	(0)
2011	Chiangrai United	6	(0)
2012–2013	TOT	9	(0)
2014	Air Force Central	16	(0)
2015–2016	Ubon UMT United	9	(0)
2017	Loei City		
2017	Trat		
- * Club domestic league appearances and goals as of 14 November 2008

Mantehwa Lahmsombat (Thai: แมนเทวา ล่ามสมบัติ; born August 16, 1981), simply known as Man (Thai: แมน). He is a retired professional footballer from Khon Kaen, Thailand.

He also played for Bangkok University FC in the 2007 AFC Champions League group stage.

== Clubs ==
Senior

Year	Club	League
2004-2007	Bangkok United	Thai Premier League
2008	Samut Songkhram	Thai Premier League
2009	TTM Samut Sakhon	Thai Premier League
2010	Osotsapa	Thai Premier League
2011	Chiangrai United	Thai Premier League
2012-2013	TOT	Thai Premier League
2014	Air Force Central	Thai Premier League
2015	Ubon UMT United	Regional League Division 2

== Honor ==
Ubon UMT United

- Regional League Division 2:
  - Winners : 2015
- Regional League North-East Division
  - Runner-up : 2015
