= Santitorn Lattirom =

Thai footballer (born 1990)

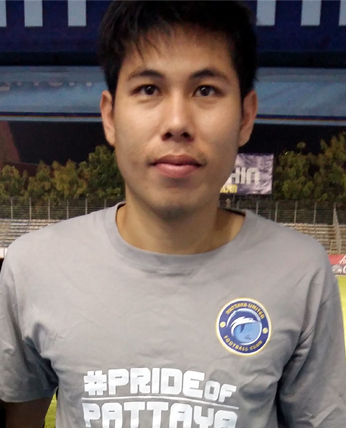

Personal information
- Date of birth: 23 June 1990 (age 36)
- Place of birth: Bangkok, Thailand
- Height: 1.71 m (5 ft 7 1/2 in)
- Position: Midfielder

Team information
- Current team: Chanthaburi
- Number: 16

Senior career*
Years	Team	Apps	(Gls)
2013	Police United	0	(0)
2013–2016	Samutsongkhram	2	(0)
2017	Thai Honda	9	(0)
2017	Pattaya United	2	(1)
2018	Nongbua Pitchaya	14	(2)
2019	Suphanburi	8	(0)
2019–2020	Nongbua Pitchaya	26	(1)
2020–2021	Police Tero	13	(0)
2021–2022	Khon Kaen United	25	(0)
2022–2023	Rajpracha	19	(0)
2023–2024	Pattaya United	30	(1)
2024	Customs United	9	(0)
2025–	Chanthaburi	11	(0)
- * Club domestic league appearances and goals as of 17 December 2025

Santitorn Lattirom (Thai: สันติธร สัทธิรมย์; born June 23, 1990) is a Thai professional footballer who plays as a midfielder for Thai League 2 club Chanthaburi.
