= Sammy Slot =

Danish footballer (born 1997)

Personal information
- Full name: Sammy Khatthajan Slot Christensen
- Date of birth: 26 February 1997 (age 29)
- Place of birth: Denmark
- Height: 1.78 m (5 ft 10 in)
- Position: Striker

Youth career
- 2011: HB Köge Youth
- 2011-2012: Naestved
- 2012-2014: HB Köge Youth
- 2014: Naestved
- 2015: Levante
- 2015-2016: Lyngby

Senior career*
Years	Team	Apps	(Gls)
2016-2017	Køge Nord		
2017-2018	Köge Boldklub		
2018	Port	2	(0)
2019-2021	Jammerbugt		
2021-2022	Tårnby	9	(0)
2022	Hastrup FC		
- * Club domestic league appearances and goals

Sammy Slot (Thai: แซมมี่ คัทธจันทร์ ซล็อท คริสเตียนเซ่น born 26 February 1997 in Denmark) is a Danish footballer.

== Career ==
In 2018, he signed for Port F.C.
