= Niranrit Jarernsuk =

Thai footballer (born 1990)

Personal information
- Full name: Niranrit Jarernsuk
- Date of birth: 9 June 1990 (age 36)
- Place of birth: Chonburi, Thailand
- Height: 1.81 m (5 ft 11 1/2 in)
- Positions: Defender; defensive midfielder

Youth career
- 2006–2008: BEC Tero Sasana

Senior career*
Years	Team	Apps	(Gls)
2008	BEC Tero Sasana	5	(0)
2009–2012	Pattaya United	57	(6)
2013	Nakhon Ratchasima	11	(2)
2013–2014	Bangkok	22	(1)
2015	PTT Rayong	16	(0)
2015–2016	BBCU	34	(4)
2017	Trat	19	(2)
2018–2019	Ubon United	6	(0)
2019	Navy	10	(0)
Total		180	(15)

International career
2008–2009	Thailand U19		
- * Club domestic league appearances and goals as of 28 June 2008

Niranrit Jarernsuk (Thai: นิรันดร์ฤทธิ์ เจริญสุข, born June 9, 1990) is a Thai retired professional footballer.
