= Sujinda Dangvan =

Thai-American footballer (born 1991)

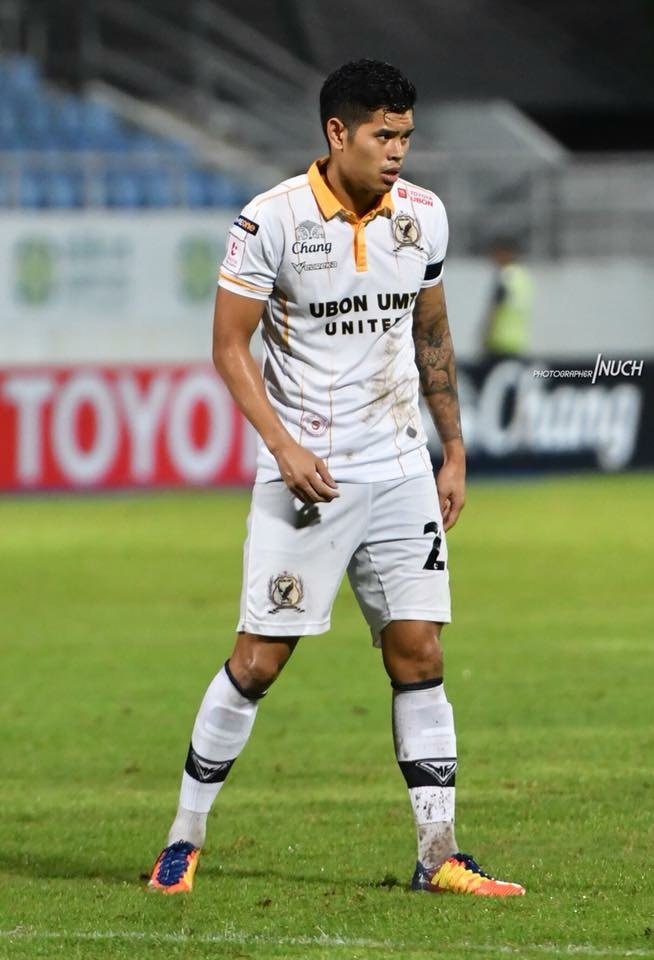
- Sujinda playing for Ubon United in 2017

Personal information
- Date of birth: 20 October 1991 (age 35)
- Place of birth: San Diego, California, United States
- Height: 1.78 m (5 ft 10 in)
- Position: Midfielder

Youth career
- 2001–2005: Thai FA Youth National Team Academy
- 2007–2010: Eastside Timbers
- 2009–2012: Western Washington University
- 2010–2012: Portland Timbers U23

Senior career*
Years	Team	Apps	(Gls)
2012–2013	BEC Tero Sasana	0	(0)
2013	→ BCC Tero (loan)	14	(2)
2014–2016	Krabi	8	(0)
2015–2016	→ Trang (loan)	27	(6)
2017	Ubon UMT United	6	(1)
2018–2020	Police Tero	7	(0)
Total		62	(9)
- * Club domestic league appearances and goals

Sujinda Dangvan (Thai: สุจินดา ดั่งวัน; born 20 October 1991), or simply known as Billy (Thai: บิลลี่), is a Thai-American former professional footballer who played as a midfielder in Thai League 1. Born in the United States, he represented both Thailand and the United States at various youth national team levels.
