= Prasit Kotmaha =

Thai footballer

Personal information
- Full name: Prasit Kotmaha
- Date of birth: 9 September 1979 (age 47)
- Place of birth: Loei, Thailand
- Height: 1.71 m (5 ft 7 1/2 in)
- Position: Goalkeeper

Senior career*
Years	Team	Apps	(Gls)
2007–2013	Pattaya United	86	(0)
2014	Nakhon Pathom United	16	(0)
2018	Isan Pattaya		
- * Club domestic league appearances and goals as of 02:31, 6 February 2018 (UTC)

Prasit Kotmaha (Thai: ประสิทธิ์ โคตรมหา) is a Thai retired footballer.
