= Wutthisak Maneesook =

Thai footballer (born 1986)

Personal information
- Full name: Wutthisak Maneesook
- Date of birth: 26 August 1986 (age 40)
- Place of birth: Nakhon Pathom, Thailand
- Height: 1.81 m (5 ft 11 1/2 in)
- Position: Defender

Senior career*
Years	Team	Apps	(Gls)
2007–2009	Nakhon Pathom	56	(0)
2010	Pattaya United	11	(0)
2011	Sriracha	24	(0)
2012	BEC Tero Sasana	4	(0)
2013	Ratchaburi	12	(0)
2014	Police United	26	(0)
2015	Siam Navy	9	(0)
2015	TOT	10	(1)
2016	Nakhon Pathom United	19	(2)
2017–2018	Rayong		
2019–	Bangkok		
- * Club domestic league appearances and goals as of 21 October 2015

Wutthisak Maneesook (Thai: วุฒิศักดิ์ มณีสุข, born 26 August 1986) is a Thai professional footballer who currently plays for Rayong in the Thai League 2.
