= Theerayut Duangpimy =

Thai footballer (born 1982)

Personal information
- Full name: Theerayut Duangpimy
- Date of birth: November 20, 1982 (age 43)
- Place of birth: Buriram, Thailand
- Height: 1.73 m (5 ft 8 in)
- Position: Defender

Senior career*
Years	Team	Apps	(Gls)
2007–2008	Customs Department		
2009–2010	Customs Utd		
2011–2013	Pattaya United	10	(0)

International career
1998–1999	Thailand U17		
- * Club domestic league appearances and goals as of 28 June 2008

Theerayut Duangpimy (Thai ธีรยุทธ ด้วงพิมาย ) is a Thai former footballer. He currently plays for Thailand Division 1 League side Samut Prakan Customs United F.C.
