= Kosawat Wongwailikit =

Thai footballer (born 1988)

Personal information
- Full name: Kosawat Wongwailikit
- Date of birth: 17 February 1988 (age 38)
- Place of birth: Phetchabun, Thailand
- Height: 1.82 m (5 ft 11 1/2 in)
- Position: Defender

Youth career
- 2007–2008: Osotspa

Senior career*
Years	Team	Apps	(Gls)
2009–2014	Osotspa Saraburi	69	(4)
2015–2016	Ratchaburi Mitr Phol	12	(0)
2016	→ Sukhothai (loan)	3	(0)
2017	BBCU	6	(0)
2017	PTT Rayong	11	(0)
- * Club domestic league appearances and goals as of 14 November 2008

Kosawat Wongwailikit (Thai: โกศวัต ว่องไวลิขิต, born February 17, 1988), simply known as Tae (Thai: เต้), is a Thai retired professional footballer who plays as a defender.
