= Eric Kamdem Kamdem =

Cameroonian footballer

Eric Kamdem
Personal information
- Full name: Eric Kamdem Kamdem
- Date of birth: February 24, 1983
- Place of birth: Buea, Cameroon
- Date of death: August 8, 2009 (aged 26)
- Place of death: Ayos, Cameroon
- Height: 1.86 m (6 ft 1 in)
- Position: Defender

Youth career
- 1997–1998: Astres FC

Senior career*
Years	Team	Apps	(Gls)
1999–2003	Botafogo FC Buéa	47	(11)
2004	BEC Tero Sasana	10	(0)
2004–2005	APEP FC	16	(3)
2005	Fovu Baham	34	(0)
2006	Anzhi Makhachkala	33	(0)
2007	Dinamo Minsk	10	(0)
2007	→ Gomel (loan)	2	(0)
2008	→ Illichivets Mariupol (loan)	19	(0)
2008–2009	Illichivets Mariupol	22	(0)
- * Club domestic league appearances and goals as of 0 ‡ National team caps and goals as of 0

Eric Kamdem Kamdem (February 24, 1983 - 8 August 2009) was a Cameroonian footballer.

== Early life ==
Kamdem was born in Buea and raised in Yaoundé. He has two siblings his brother worked in the Italian city of Cagliari and his sister has studied in Monaco.

== Career ==
He played professionally in the Belarusian Premier League for Dinamo Minsk and Gomel. He was member of the Russian First Division team Anzhi Makhachkala and the Ukrainian club FC Illychivets Mariupol.

== Death ==
Kamdem died on Saturday 8 August 2009 in a car accident during his summer vacation with his wife in Ayos, Cameroon.
