= Paulo Roberto (footballer, born 1977) =

Brazilian footballer

Personal information
- Full name: Paulo Roberto de Oliveira Júnior
- Date of birth: 11 August 1977 (age 49)
- Place of birth: São João de Meriti, Brazil
- Height: 1.80 m (5 ft 11 in)
- Position: Forward

Senior career*
Years	Team	Apps	(Gls)
2007	Flamurtari		
2009	Pattaya United	9	(0)
- * Club domestic league appearances and goals

Paulo Roberto de Oliveira Júnior (born 11 August 1977) is a Brazilian retired footballer who played as a forward.
