= Patrick Sunday =

Motswana footballer

Personal information
- Full name: Patrick Sunday
- Date of birth: 3 March 1975 (age 51)
- Place of birth: Benin City, Nigeria
- Position: Striker

Senior career*
| Years | Team | Apps | (Gls) |
| 2000–2007 | Defence Force | | |
| 2007–2009 | Mogoditshane Fighters | | |
| 2010 | TTM Phichit | 1 | |
| 2011 | Roi Et United F.C. | | |

International career
| 2000 | Botswana | 1 | (0) |
- * Club domestic league appearances and goals

Patrick Sunday (born 3 March 1975) is a former footballer who played as a striker. Born in Nigeria, he won one cap for the Botswana in 2000.
