= Pravit Wasoontra =

Thai footballer

Personal information
- Full name: Pravit Wasoontra
- Date of birth: July 15, 1981 (age 45)
- Place of birth: Khon Kaen, Thailand
- Height: 1.77 m (5 ft 9 1/2 in)
- Position: Striker

Senior career*
Years	Team	Apps	(Gls)
2007–2010	Nakhon Pathom		
- * Club domestic league appearances and goals as of 14 November 2008

Pravit Wasoontra is a retired professional footballer from Thailand.
