= Prawit Prariwanta =

Thai footballer (born 1983)

Personal information
- Full name: Prawit Prariwanta
- Date of birth: September 9, 1983 (age 43)
- Place of birth: Mahasarakham, Thailand
- Height: 1.75 m (5 ft 9 in)
- Position: Defender

Team information
- Current team: Nakhon Pathom United
- Number: 4

Senior career*
Years	Team	Apps	(Gls)
2008–2009	Pattaya United	25	(0)
2010	Buriram		
2011–2012	Ayutthaya		
2012–2013	Thai Honda		
2014	Phayao		
2015	Phrae United		
2015	Nakhon Pathom United		
2016–	Samut Songkhram		
- * Club domestic league appearances and goals as of 28 June 2008

Prawit Prariwanta (Thai: ประวิทย์ ปะริวันตา, born September 9, 1983) is a Thai professional footballer who currently plays for Nakhon Pathom United in the Thai Division 1 League.
