= Kazuto Kushida =

Japanese footballer (born 1987)

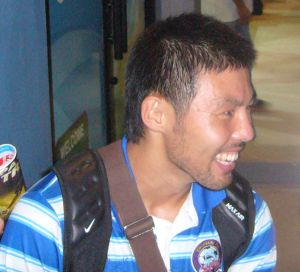
- Kushida in 2011

Personal information
- Date of birth: 20 January 1987 (age 39)
- Place of birth: Kyoto, Japan
- Height: 1.68 m (5 ft 6 in)
- Position: Defensive midfielder

Senior career*
Years	Team	Apps	(Gls)
2008–2010	Sagawa Printing SC	68	(2)
2011–2015	Chonburi	106	(6)
2015	→ Phan Thong (loan)	5	(0)
2015	→ Chainat Hornbill (loan)	3	(0)
2016–2017	Chainat Hornbill	13	(0)
2017–2018	Wollongong United		
2019	Iwate Grulla Morioka	5	(0)
2020	Chonburi	14	(0)
- * Club domestic league appearances and goals as of 25 October 2020 ‡ National team caps and goals as of 18 July 2008

Kazuto Kushida (櫛田一斗, Kushida Kazuto; born 20 January 1987 in Kyoto) is a Japanese football player.
