= Anirut Suebyim =

Thai footballer

Personal information
- Full name: Anirut Suebyim
- Date of birth: January 4, 1990 (age 36)
- Place of birth: Suphan Buri, Thailand
- Height: 1.76 m (5 ft 9 1/2 in)
- Position: Striker

Team information
- Current team: Phuket City
- Number: 11

Youth career
- 2006–2008: Osotspa

Senior career*
Years	Team	Apps	(Gls)
2009–2015	Osotspa Samut Prakan	21	(5)
2015–2016	Nakhon Pathom United	19	(6)
2016	Trang		
2017	Kopoon Warrior		
2018–	Phuket City		
- * Club domestic league appearances and goals

Anirut Suebyim (Thai: อนิรุตน์ สืบยิ้ม) is a Thai professional footballer.
