= Evans Mensah (footballer, born 1988) =

Ghanaian footballer

Evans Russ Mensah
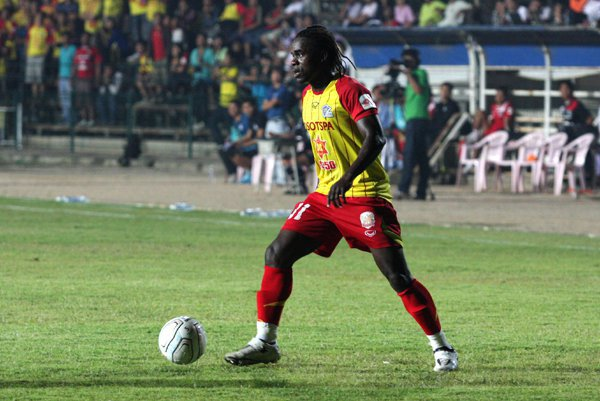

Personal information
- Full name: Evans Russ Mensah
- Date of birth: July 25, 1988 (age 38)
- Place of birth: Kumasi, Ghana
- Position: Striker

Youth career
- Years: Team
- 2004: Kumasi United
- 2005: Power F.C.
- 2006–2007: Kakyire F.C.
2008–2009	Soweto Arsenal Academy	21	(15)
2009–2011	Osotsapa FC	43	(28)
2011	Chanthaburi F.C.	23	(17)
2011–2013	Chiangmai F.C.	36	(22)
2014–????	New Radiant SC	18	(15)

Evans Russ Mensah (born 25 July 1988) is a Ghanaian former professional football player.

== Biography ==
Mensah played academy football in Ghana and South Africa, where he was the top scorer for his academy teams. Mensah started his professional career in the Ghana Premier League, scoring twice on his debut for Okwawu United. He caught the eyes of many teams, which took him to Malaysia to Perlis F.C. for his first international trials. However, he returned to Ghana to continue his career.

Later in his career, Mensah moved on to Thai League 1. His speed, pace and skills made him break into the first team. He was awarded players player of his team on his first season in the Thai Premier League.

Mensah finished his playing career at New Radiant SC, a Dhivehi League team in Maldives.
