= Sasa Disic =

German footballer (born 1986)

Personal information
- Full name: Sasa Disic
- Date of birth: 21 March 1986 (age 40)
- Place of birth: Munich, West Germany
- Height: 1.81 m (5 ft 11 1/2 in)
- Position: Midfielder

Youth career
- 1995–2004: TSV Moosach Hartmannshofen

Senior career*
Years	Team	Apps	(Gls)
2005–2006	TSV 1865 Dachau	29	(5)
2006–2007	FC Anker Wismar	44	(6)
2007–2008	1. FC Union Solingen	21	(3)
2009–2010	Pattaya United	52	(25)
- Herakles SV München
- * Club domestic league appearances and goals

Sasa Disic (born 21 March 1986) is a German footballer.

== Career ==
Born in Munich, Germany. In his youth he was playing for the local team TSV Moosach Hartmannshofen. From TSV 1865 Dachau he went to fifth level side Anker Wismar and played in 44 games for them, while scoring six goals. In 2007, he changed to 1. FC Union Solingen. In January 2009 he signed a two-year deal with the new founded Thailand Premier League club Pattaya United.
