= Eric Fotou Kamdem =

Cameroonian footballer

Eric Kamdem
Personal information
- Full name: Eric Fotou Kamdem
- Date of birth: January 2, 1986 (age 40)
- Place of birth: Obala, Cameroon
- Height: 1.70 m (5 ft 7 in)
- Position: Attacking midfielder

Team information
- Current team: BEC Tero Sasana F.C.
- Number: 16

Senior career*
Years	Team	Apps	(Gls)
?	?		
2008–2017	BEC Tero Sasana F.C.	?	
2017–	Samut Prakan United	?	(1)
- * Club domestic league appearances and goals as of 22 June 2008

Eric Fotou Kamdem (born 2 January 1986) is a Cameroon-born footballer who has played for the Thai side BEC Tero Sasana F.C. since February 2008.
