= Kignelman Athanase =

Ivorian footballer

Athanase Kignelman
Personal information
- Full name: Athanase Kignelman Ouattara
- Date of birth: 6 June 1988 (age 38)
- Place of birth: Abidjan, Côte d'Ivoire
- Height: 1.82 m (5 ft 11 1/2 in)
- Position: Defender

Team information
- Current team: Pattaya United
- Number: 2

Senior career*
Years	Team	Apps	(Gls)
2007–2008	Rajnavy Rayong	36	(3)
2009–	Pattaya United	39	(0)
- * Club domestic league appearances and goals as of 23 April 2009

Athanase Kignelman Ouattara (born 6 June 1988) is an Ivorian footballer. He currently plays for Thai Premier League clubside Pattaya United.
