= 2008 Thailand League Division 2 =

- Season: 2008
- Champions: Prachinburi FC
- Promoted: Prachinburi FC; Army Welfare Department F.C. Songkhla FC; Si Saket FC
- Goals: 49
- Biggest home win: Narathiwat 3 - 1 Loei City
- Biggest away win: Narathiwat 0 - 2 Raj Pracha-Nonthaburi
- Highest scoring: Loei City 3 - 3 Chiangrai United (6)

2008 Thailand League Division 2 in association football league competitions was contested by the two Group league winners of the 3rd level championships of Thailand.

The league winners and runners up Group A and Group B were promoted to Thailand Division 1 League. No teams would be relegated due to restructuring at the end of the season.

== Member clubs ==
=== Group A ===
- Cha Choeng Sao (Relegation from 2007 Thailand League Division 1 11th Group B)
- Chiangmai United
- Nakhon Ratchasima (Relegation from 2007 Thailand League Division 1 9th Group B)
- Narathiwat (Relegation from 2007 Thailand League Division 1 8th Group A)
- Prachinburi
- Raj Pracha (Promoted 2007-08 Khǒr Royal Cup (ถ้วย ข.) Winner)
- Ratchaburi (Relegation from 2007 Thailand League Division 1 12th Group A)
- Samut Prakan
- Sakon Nakhon (Relegation from 2007 Thailand League Division 1 10th Group A)
- Satun
- Songkhla (Promoted from 2007 Provincial League Runner-Up)

=== Group B ===
- Airforce Training College (Relegation from 2007 Thailand League Division 1 9th Group A)
- Army Welfare Department
- Bangkok Bravo (Relegation from 2007 Thailand League Division 1 11th Group A)
- Bangkok Christian College
- Bangkok North Central ASSN (Relegation from 2007 Thailand League Division 1 8th Group B)
- Kasem Bundit University (Promoted 2007-08 Khǒr Royal Cup (ถ้วย ข.) Runner-Up)
- Rajadamnern Thonburi College
- Lopburi (Promoted from 2007 Provincial League Winner)
- Royal Thai Marine Corps (Relegation from 2007 Thailand League Division 1 12th Group B)
- Navy Fleet Support
- Sisaket (Relegation from 2007 Thailand League Division 1 10th Group B)

== 2008 Thailand League Division 2 All locations ==
Locations of the 2008 Thailand League Division 2 All Teams
2008 Thailand Division 2 League (Group A)
2008 Thailand Division 2 League (Group B)
Football clubs in Bangkok Metropolitan Region

=== Stadium and locations (Group A) ===
Team	Location	Stadium	Capacity
Cha Choeng Sao	Chachoengsao	Chachoengsao Town municipality Stadium	?
Chiangmai United	Chiang Mai	Chiangmai Municipality Stadium	?
Nakhon Ratchasima	Nakhon Ratchasima	Nakhon Ratchasima Municipality Stadium	?
Narathiwat	Narathiwat	Narathiwat Province Stadium	?
Prachinburi	Prachinburi	Prachinburi Province Stadium	?
Raj Pracha	Huai Khwang, Bangkok	Thai Bev Huai Khwang football field	?
Ratchaburi	Ratchaburi	Ratchaburi Province Stadium	?
Samut Prakan	Samut Prakan	Sit Chaiyasam Football Field	?
Sakon Nakhon	Sakon Nakhon	Sakolrajwittayanukul School	?
Satun	Satun	Satun Province Stadium	?
Songkhla	Hat Yai, Songkhla	Jiranakorn Stadium	?

=== Stadium and locations (Group B) ===
Team	Location	Stadium	Capacity
Airforce Training College	Don Muang, Bangkok	Airforce Chantharu beksa Stadium	?
Army Welfare Department	Bangkok	Thai Army Sports Stadium	15,000
Bangkok Bravo	Thung Khru, Bangkok	72-years Anniversary Stadium (Bang Mod)	8,126
Bangkok Christian College	Huai Khwang, Bangkok	Jarun Burapharat Stadium	?
Bangkok North Central ASSN	Pathum Thani	North Bangkok University Stadium (Rangsit)	?
Kasem Bundit University	Min Buri, Bangkok	Kasem Bundit University Stadium (Rom Klao)	2,000
Rajadamnern Thonburi College	Thawi Watthana, Bangkok	Rajadamnern Commercial Sport Complex	?
Lopburi	Lopburi	Phra Ramesuan Stadium (Lopburi province Stadium)	?
Royal Thai Marine Corps	Sattahip, Chonburi	Communication Battalion Football Field (Royal Thai Marine Corps)	?
Navy Fleet Support	Sattahip, Chonburi	Navy Fleet Support Football Field	?
Sisaket	Sisaket	Sri Nakhon Lamduan Stadium	10,000

== Results ==
=== League table (Group A) ===
Pos	Team	Pld	W	D	L	GF	GA	GD	Pts
1	Prachinburi FC	20	12	5	3	39	18	+21	41
2	Songkhla FC	20	11	4	5	27	17	+10	37
3	Narathiwat FC	20	10	7	3	26	17	+9	37
4	Nakhon Ratchasima FC	20	9	4	7	36	19	+17	31
5	Samut Prakan FC	20	8	7	5	30	21	+9	31
6	Raj Pracha FC	20	8	7	5	21	20	+1	31
7	Ratchaburi FC	20	7	9	4	32	26	+6	30
8	Cha Choeng Sao FC	20	6	5	9	17	32	−15	23
9	Chiang Mai FC	20	3	6	11	25	34	−9	15
10	Satun FC	20	3	4	13	26	46	−20	13
11	Sakon Nakon FC	20	1	6	13	15	43	−28	9

Source: rsssf.com

=== League table (Group B) ===
Pos	Team	Pld	W	D	L	GF	GA	GD	Pts
1	Army Welfare Department F.C.	20	11	6	3	37	17	+20	39
2	Si Saket FC	20	10	7	3	41	20	+21	37
3	Bangkok Christian College FC	20	8	7	5	31	22	+9	31
4	Kasem Bundit University FC	19	8	4	7	31	24	+7	31
5	Lopburi FC	20	8	5	7	23	20	+3	29
6	Bangkok North Central ASSN FC	20	6	10	4	21	24	−3	28
7	Airforce Training College FC	20	7	6	7	25	22	+3	27
8	Marine College FC	20	5	8	7	24	32	−8	23
9	Navy Fleet Support FC	20	5	7	8	24	32	−8	22
10	Thonburi College FC	20	5	5	10	12	22	−10	20
11	Bangkok Bravo FC	20	2	3	15	16	47	−31	9

Source: rsssf.com

== Qualification ==
=== List of qualified teams ===
Last Update October 1, 2011

(Group A) (2)

- Prachinburi FC (Winner)
- Songkhla FC (Runner-up)

(Group B) (2)

- Army Welfare Department F.C. (Winner)
- Si Saket FC (Runner-up)

== 3/4 Place ==
First Leg [Sep 21] 2008
16.00 UTC+7

Songkhla FC	3 – 0	Si Saket FC
?		?

Suphachalasai Stadium, Bangkok
Referee: ?
Second Leg [Sep 28] 2008
16.00 UTC+7

Si Saket FC	3 – 2	Songkhla FC
?		?

Suphachalasai Stadium, Bangkok
Referee: ?

== Final ==
First Leg [Sep 21]
?

Prachinburi FC	1 – 2	Army Welfare Department F.C.
?		?

Suphachalasai Stadium, Bangkok
Referee: ?
First Leg [Sep 21]
?

Army Welfare Department F.C.	1 – 2 3-4 p	Prachinburi FC
?		?

Suphachalasai Stadium, Bangkok
Referee: ?

== Champions ==
The 2008 winner of the Thailand Division 2 League Championship was Prachinburi FC.

== See also ==
- 2008 Thailand Premier League
- 2008 Thailand League Division 1
- Thailand 2008 RSSSF
