= 2008 Thailand League Division 2 (Group B) =

Thailand Division 2 League Group B 2008
- Season: 2008
- Champions: Army Welfare Department FC
- Promoted: Army Welfare Department FC; Si Saket FC
- Biggest home win: Airforce Training College FC 6-1 Bangkok Christian College FC
- Biggest away win: Bangkok Bravo FC 0-8 Si Saket FC
- Highest scoring: Marine College FC 2-6 Navy Fleet Support FC 9 Goals

The 2008 Thailand League Division 2 Group B had 11 teams.

The league winners and runners up were promoted to Thailand Division 1 League. No teams would be relegated due to restructuring at the end of the season.

== Member clubs& locations ==
- Airforce Training College FC (Relegation from Thailand Division 1 League 2007 9th Group A)
- Army Welfare Department F.C.
- Bangkok Bravo FC (Relegation from Thailand Division 1 League 2007 11th Group A)
- Bangkok Christian College FC
- Bangkok North Central ASSN FC (Relegation from Thailand Division 1 League 2007 8th Group B)
- Kasem Bundit University FC
- Lopburi FC (promoted from Provincial League 2007 Winner)
- Marine College FC (Relegation from Thailand Division 1 League 2007 12th Group B)
- Navy Fleet Support FC
- Si Saket FC (Relegation from Thailand Division 1 League 2007 10th Group B)
- Thonburi College FC

== Stadium and locations ==
Locations of the 2008 Thailand League Division 2 (Group B) teams

Team	Location	Stadium	Capacity
Airforce Training College	Don Muang, Bangkok	Air Force Stadium	?
Army Welfare Department	Bangkok	Thai Army Sports Stadium	15,000
Bangkok Bravo	Thung Khru, Bangkok	72-years Anniversary Stadium (Bang Mod)	8,126
Bangkok Christian College	Huai Khwang, Bangkok	Jarun Burapharat Stadium	?
Bangkok North Central ASSN	Pathum Thani	North Bangkok University Stadium (Rangsit)	?
Kasem Bundit University	Min Buri, Bangkok	Kasem Bundit University Stadium (Rom Klao)	2,000
Panitchayakarn Rajdamnern	Thawi Watthana, Bangkok	Panitchayakarn Rajdamnern Sportcomplex	?
Lopburi	Lopburi	Phra Ramesuan Stadium (Lopburi province Stadium)	?
Royal Thai Marine Corps	Sattahip, Chonburi	Communication Battalion Football Field (Royal Thai Marine Corps)	?
Navy Fleet Support	Sattahip, Chonburi	Navy Fleet Support Football Field	?
Sisaket	Sisaket	Sri Nakhon Lamduan Stadium	10,000

Football clubs in Bangkok Metropolitan Region

== Final league table ==
Pos	Team	Pld	W	D	L	GF	GA	GD	Pts
1	Army Welfare Department F.C.	20	11	6	3	37	17	+20	39
2	Si Saket FC	20	10	7	3	41	20	+21	37
3	Bangkok Christian College FC	20	8	7	5	31	22	+9	31
4	Kasem Bundit University FC	19	8	4	7	31	24	+7	31
5	Lopburi FC	20	8	5	7	23	20	+3	29
6	Bangkok North Central ASSN FC	20	6	10	4	21	24	−3	28
7	Airforce Training College FC	20	7	6	7	25	22	+3	27
8	Marine College FC	20	5	8	7	24	32	−8	23
9	Navy Fleet Support FC	20	5	7	8	24	32	−8	22
10	Thonburi College FC	20	5	5	10	12	22	−10	20
11	Bangkok Bravo FC	20	2	3	15	16	47	−31	9

Source: rsssf.com

== Results ==
Home \ Away	ATC	AWD	BBR	BCC	BNC	KBU	LPB	MRN	NFS	SSK	TBR
Airforce Training College FC		1–1	2–3	6–1	0–1	2–0	1–0	1–1	4–2	1–1	1–2
Army Welfare Department F.C.	1–0		4–1	0–0	1–1	2–0	3–4	1–1	2–0	3–2	3–0
Bangkok Bravo FC	2–4	0–2		1–4	5–1	1–1	0–2	0–0	0–1	0–8	–
Bangkok Christian College FC	0–1	2–1	3–0		0–1	4–3	1–0	2–2	1–1	1–1	4–0
Bangkok North Central ASSN FC	1–1	1–0	1–1	0–0		1–1	1–0	0–0	3–1	1–1	1–0
Kasem Bundit University FC	1–1	2–1	1–0	5–2	1–2		0–1	–	1–5	1–1	–
Lopburi FC	1–0	–	3–0	0–2	2–1	0–2		2–0	0–0	2–2	5–1
Marine College FC	0–2	0–3	1–0	2–2	2–1	1–2	2–2		5–4	1–2	1–0
Navy Fleet Support FC	4–2	0–0	2–1	1–3	0–0	0–1	0–0	2–1		4–2	–
Si Saket FC	1–0	0–1	4–0	0–0	3–3	2–1	1–0	2–0	1–0		2–0
Thonburi College FC	0–0	1–2	1–0	–	0–0	0–2	3–1	0–0	0–0	0–1	

Legend: Blue = home team win; Yellow = draw; Red = away team win.

== See also ==
- 2008 Thailand Premier League
- 2008 Thailand League Division 1
- 2008 Thailand League Division 2
- 2008 Thailand League Division 2 (Group A)
- Thailand 2008 RSSSF
