= Football records and statistics in Thailand =

This page details football records in Thailand.

== Most successful teams ==
| Team | Total number of trophies | Thai League 1 winners | Thai League 2 winners | Thai League 3 winners | Thai League 4 winners | Provincial League winners | Asian Club Championship and AFC Champions League winners | FA Cup winners | League Cup winners | Queen's Cup winners | Kor Royal Cup (1996–2016) winners | Thailand Champions Cup winners |
|---|---|---|---|---|---|---|---|---|---|---|---|---|
| Buriram United | 33 | 12 (2008, 2011, 2013, 2014, 2015, 2017, 2018, 2021/22, 2022/23, 2023/24, 2024/25, 2025/26) | | | | | | 8 (2011, 2012, 2013, 2015, 2021/22, 2022/23, 2024/25, 2025/26) | 8 (2011, 2012, 2013, 2015, 2016 (shared), 2021/22, 2022/23, 2024/25) | | 4 (2013, 2014, 2015, 2016) | 1 (2019) |
| Port | 11 | | | | | | | 3 (1982, 2009, 2019) | 2 (2010, 2025/26) | 6 (1977-1980, 1987, 1993) | | |
| Muangthong United | 10 | 4 (2009, 2010, 2012, 2016) | 1 (2008) | | 1 (2007) | | | | 2 (2016 (shared), 2017) | | 1 (2010) | 1 (2017) |
| Air Force Central | 10 | 2 (1997, 1999) | 1 (2013) | | | | | 1 (1996) | 2 (1987, 1994) | 3 (1970 (shared), 1974, 1982) | 1 (1996) | |
| Chonburi | 9 | 1 (2007) | 1 (2024/25) | | | 1 (2005) | | 2 (2010, 2016 (shared)) | | | 4 (2007, 2009, 2011, 2012) | |
| Bangkok Bank | 8 | 1 (1996/97) | | | | | | 3 (1980, 1981 (shared), 1998) | 1 (1988) | 3 (1970 (shared), 1983, 2000) | | |
| Thai Farmers Bank | 8 | | | | | | 2 (1993-94, 1994-95) | 1 (1999) | | 4 (1994-1997) | 1 (1999) | |
| BG Pathum United | 7 | 1 (2020/21) | 1 (2019) | | | | | 1 (2014) | 1 (2023/24) | 1 (2010) | | 2 (2021, 2022) |
| Chiangrai United | 7 | 1 (2019) | | | | | | 3 (2017, 2018, 2020/21) | 1 (2018) | | | 2 (2018, 2020) |
| Police United | 7 | | 4 (1999/2000, 2005/06, 2009, 2015) | | | | | | 3 (1989, 1991, 1993) | | | |
| Rajpracha | 7 | | | | 1 (2009) | | | 4 (1976, 1977, 1984, 1994) | | 2 (1972, 1981) | | |
| Krung Thai Bank | 6 | 2 (2002/03, 2003/04) | 1 (1997/98) | | | | | | 1 (1992) | | 2 (2002, 2003) | |
| Jumpasri United | 6 | | | | | | | | 1 (1990) | 3 (2002-2004) | 2 (2001, 2006) | |
| Sinthana | 5 | 1 (1998) | | | 1 (2006) | | | 1 (1997) | | | 2 (1997, 1998) | |
| Police Tero | 4 | 2 (2000, 2001/02) | | | | | | | 1 (2014) | | 1 (2000) | |
| Bangkok United | 4 | 1 (2006) | 1 (2002/03) | | | | | 1 (2023/24) | | | | 1 (2023) |
| Thailand Tobacco Monopoly | 3 | 1 (2004/05) | 1 (2000/01) | | | | | | | | 1 (2004/05) | |
| TOT | 3 | | 1 (2003/04) | | | 1 (2006) | | 1 (1993) | | | | |
| Ratchaburi | 3 | | 1 (2012) | | 1 (2011) | | | 1 (2016 (shared)) | | | | |
| Raj Vithi | 3 | | | | | | | 2 (1974, 1975) | | 1 (1973) | | |
| Nakhon Ratchasima | 2 | | 2 (2014, 2023/24) | | | | | | | | | |
| Lamphun Warriors | 2 | | 1 (2021/22) | 1 (2020/21) | | | | | | | | |
| Rasisalai United | 2 | | 1 (2025/26) | 1 (2024/25) | | | | | | | | |
| Songkhla United | 2 | | 1 (2011) | | 1 (2010) | | | | | | | |
| Nongbua Pitchaya | 2 | | 1 (2020/21) | | 1 (2016 (shared)) | | | | | | | |
| Nakhon Pathom United | 2 | | 1 (2022/23) | | 1 (2018) | | | | | | | |
| Chainat Hornbill | 2 | | 1 (2017) | | | | | 1 (2016 (shared)) | | | | |
| PT Prachuap | 2 | | | | 1 (2014) | | | | 1 (2019) | | | |
| Nakhon Sawan | 2 | | | | | 2 (2001, 2003) | | | | | | |
| Suphanburi | 2 | | | | | 2 (2002, 2004) | | | | | | |
| Navy | 2 | | | | | | | | 1 (1990) | 1 (2006) | | |
| Bangkok Bank of Commerce | 1 | | 1 (1998/99) | | | | | | | | | |
| Bangkok Christian College | 1 | | 1 (2001/02) | | | | | | | | | |
| Customs Department | 1 | | 1 (2007) | | | | | | | | | |
| Army United | 1 | | 1 (2004/05) | | | | | | | | | |
| Thawiwatthana | 1 | | 1 (2010) | | | | | | | | | |
| Thai Honda | 1 | | 1 (2016) | | | | | | | | | |
| PTT Rayong | 1 | | 1 (2018) | | | | | | | | | |
| Samut Sakhon | 1 | | | 1 (2017) | | | | | | | | |
| Chiangmai United | 1 | | | 1 (2018) | | | | | | | | |
| Khon Kaen United | 1 | | | 1 (2019) | | | | | | | | |
| Uthai Thani | 1 | | | 1 (2021/22) | | | | | | | | |
| MH Nakhon Si City | 1 | | | 1 (2022/23) | | | | | | | | |
| Bangkok | 1 | | | 1 (2023/24) | | | | | | | | |
| Nara United | 1 | | | 1 (2025/26) | | | | | | | | |
| Prachinburi | 1 | | | | 1 (2008) | | | | | | | |
| Ayutthaya | 1 | | | | 1 (2012) | | | | | | | |
| Roi Et United | 1 | | | | 1 (2013) | | | | | | | |
| Ubon UMT United | 1 | | | | 1 (2015) | | | | | | | |
| Trat | 1 | | | | 1 (2016 (shared)) | | | | | | | |
| Kasetsart | 1 | | | | 1 (2016 (shared)) | | | | | | | |
| Surat Thani | 1 | | | | 1 (2016 (shared)) | | | | | | | |
| BTU United | 1 | | | | 1 (2017) | | | | | | | |
| Wat Bot City | 1 | | | | 1 (2019) | | | | | | | |
| Lopburi | 1 | | | | | 1 (2007) | | | | | | |
| Samut Prakan | 1 | | | | | 1 (2008) | | | | | | |
| Sisaket | 1 | | | | | 1 (1999/00) | | | | | | |
| Donmoon | 1 | | | | | | | 1 (1981 (shared)) | | | | |
| ThaiNamthip | 1 | | | | | | | 1 (1983) | | | | |
| Sukhothai | 1 | | | | | | | 1 (2016 (shared)) | | | | |

== Top-performing clubs - league structures ==
=== Thai League 1 ===
| Club | Champions |
|---|---|
| Buriram United | 12 (2008, 2011, 2013, 2014, 2015, 2017, 2018, 2021–22, 2022–23, 2023–24, 2024–25, 2025–26) |
| Muangthong United | 4 (2009, 2010, 2012, 2016) |
| Air Force Central | 2 (1997, 1999) |
| Police Tero | 2 (2000, 2001–02) |
| Krung Thai Bank | 2 (2002–03, 2003–04) |
| Bangkok Bank | 1 (1996–97) |
| Sinthana | 1 (1998) |
| TTM | 1 (2004–05) |
| Bangkok United | 1 (2006) |
| Chonburi | 1 (2007) |
| Chiangrai United | 1 (2019) |
| BG Pathum United | 1 (2020–21) |

==== The Invincibles ====
Unbeatable champions:

- Muangthong United in 2012
- Buriram United in 2013
- Buriram United in 2015

=== Thai League 2 ===
| Club | Champions |
|---|---|
| Police United | 4 (1999–2000, 2005–06, 2009, 2015) |
| Nakhon Ratchasima | 2 (2014, 2023–24) |
| Krung Thai Bank | 1 (1997–98) |
| Bangkok Bank of Commerce | 1 (1998–99) |
| TTM | 1 (2000–01) |
| Bangkok Christian College | 1 (2001–02) |
| Bangkok United | 1 (2002–03) |
| TOT | 1 (2003–04) |
| Army United | 1 (2004–05) |
| Customs Department | 1 (2007) |
| Muangthong United | 1 (2008) |
| Thawiwatthana | 1 (2010) |
| Songkhla United | 1 (2011) |
| Ratchaburi | 1 (2012) |
| Air Force Central | 1 (2013) |
| Thai Honda Ladkrabang | 1 (2016) |
| Chainat Hornbill | 1 (2017) |
| PTT Rayong | 1 (2018) |
| BG Pathum United | 1 (2019) |
| Nongbua Pitchaya | 1 (2020–21) |
| Lamphun Warriors | 1 (2021–22) |
| Nakorn Pathom United | 1 (2022–23) |
| Chonburi | 1 (2024–25) |
| Rasisalai United | 1 (2025–26) |

=== Thai League 3 ===
| Club | Champions |
|---|---|
| Samut Sakhon | 1 (2017) |
| JL Chiangmai United | 1 (2018) |
| Khon Kaen United | 1 (2019) |
| Lamphun Warriors | 1 (2020-21) |
| Uthai Thani | 1 (2021-22) |
| MH Nakhon Si City | 1 (2022-23) |
| Bangkok | 1 (2023-24) |
| Rasisalai United | 1 (2024-25) |
| Nara United | 1 (2025-26) |

=== Thai League 4 ===
| Club | Champions |
|---|---|
| BBCU | 1 (2006) |
| Muangthong United | 1 (2007) |
| Prachinburi | 1 (2008) |
| Rajpracha | 1 (2009) |
| Songkhla United | 1 (2010) |
| Ratchaburi | 1 (2011) |
| Ayutthaya | 1 (2012) |
| Roi Et United | 1 (2013) |
| Prachuap | 1 (2014) |
| Ubon UMT United | 1 (2015) |
| Trat | 1 (2016) |
| Kasetsart | 1 (2016) |
| Nongbua Pitchaya | 1 (2016) |
| Surat Thani | 1 (2016) |
| BTU United | 1 (2017) |
| Nakhon Pathom United | 1 (2018) |
| Wat Bot City | 1 (2019) |

=== Provincial League ===
| Club | Champions |
|---|---|
| Nakhon Sawan | 2 (2001, 2003) |
| Suphanburi | 2 (2002, 2004) |
| Sisaket | 1 (1999/00) |
| Chonburi | 1 (2005) |
| TOT | 1 (2006) |
| Lopburi | 1 (2007) |
| Samut Prakan | 1 (2008) |

=== Futsal League ===
| Club | Champions |
|---|---|
| Chonburi Bluewave | 11 (2006, 2009, 2010, 2011–12, 2012–13, 2014, 2015, 2016, 2017, 2020, 2021–22) |
| Port | 4 (2007, 2018, 2019, 2022) |
| Hongyen Thakam | 3 (2023, 2024, 2025) |

== Top-performing clubs - cup competitions ==
=== Asian Club Championship and AFC Champions League ===
| Club | Champions |
|---|---|
| Thai Farmers Bank | 2 (1993-94, 1994-95) |

=== Thailand FA Cup ===
| Club | Champions |
|---|---|
| Buriram United | 8 (2011, 2012, 2013, 2015, 2021–22, 2022–23, 2024–25, 2025–26) |
| Rajpracha | 4 (1976, 1977, 1984, 1994) |
| Bangkok Bank | 3 (1980, 1981, 1998) |
| Port | 3 (1982, 2009, 2019) |
| Chiangrai United | 3 (2017, 2018, 2020–21) |
| Raj Vithi | 2 (1974, 1975) |
| Chonburi | 2 (2010, 2016) |
| Donmoon | 1 (1981) |
| ThaiNamthip F.C. | 1 (1983) |
| TOT | 1 (1993) |
| Air Force Central | 1 (1996) |
| Sinthana | 1 (1997) |
| Thai Farmers Bank | 1 (1999) |
| Bangkok Glass | 1 (2014) |
| Chainat Hornbill | 1 (2016) |
| Ratchaburi Mitr Phol | 1 (2016) |
| Sukhothai | 1 (2016) |
| Bangkok United | 1 (2023–24) |

=== Thailand League Cup ===
| Club | Champions |
|---|---|
| Buriram United | 8 (2011, 2012, 2013, 2015, 2016, 2021–22, 2022–23, 2024–25) |
| Police United | 3 (1989, 1991, 1993) |
| Air Force Central | 2 (1987, 1994) |
| Muangthong United | 2 (2016, 2017) |
| Port | 2 (2010, 2025–26) |
| Bangkok Bank | 1 (1988) |
| Jumpasri United | 1 (1990) |
| Navy | 1 (1990) |
| Krung Thai Bank | 1 (1992) |
| Police Tero | 1 (2014) |
| Chiangrai United | 1 (2018) |
| PT Prachuap | 1 (2019) |
| BG Pathum United | 1 (2023–24) |

=== Thailand Champions Cup (2017 - Present) ===
| Club | Champions |
|---|---|
| Chiangrai United | 2 (2018, 2020) |
| BG Pathum United | 2 (2021, 2022) |
| Muangthong United | 1 (2017) |
| Buriram United | 1 (2019) |
| Bangkok United | 1 (2023) |

=== Kor Royal Cup - 1996-2016 ===
| Club | Champions |
|---|---|
| Chonburi | 4 (2007, 2009, 2011, 2012) |
| Buriram United | 4 (2013, 2014, 2015, 2016) |
| Sinthana | 2 (1997, 1998) |
| Jumpasri United | 2 (2001, 2006) |
| Krung Thai Bank | 2 (2002, 2003) |
| Air Force Central | 1 (1996) |
| Thai Farmers Bank | 1 (1999) |
| Police Tero | 1 (2000) |
| Thailand Tobacco Monopoly | 1 (2004/05) |
| Muangthong United | 1 (2010) |

=== Queen's Cup ===
| Club | Champions |
|---|---|
| Port | 6 (1977, 1978, 1979, 1980, 1987, 1993) |
| Thai Farmers Bank | 4 (1994, 1995, 1996, 1997) |
| Air Force Central | 3 (1970, 1974, 1982) |
| Bangkok Bank | 3 (1970, 1983, 2000) |
| Jumpasri United | 3 (2002, 2003, 2004) |
| Rajpracha | 2 (1972, 1981) |
| Raj-Vithi | 1 (1973) |
| Navy | 1 (2006) |
| Bangkok Glass | 1 (2010) |

=== Super Cup ===
| Club | Champions |
|---|---|
| Bangkok Glass | 1 (2009) |

== National team top caps goalscorers ==
As of 5 October 2026
Players in bold are still active with Thailand.

=== Most appearances ===
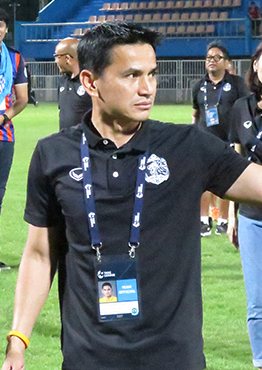
Kiatisuk Senamuang is Thailand's top goalscorer and their most capped player

| Rank | Player | Caps | Goals | Career |
|---|---|---|---|---|
| 1 | Kiatisuk Senamuang | 134 | 71 | 1993–2007 |
| 2 | **Teerasil Dangda** | 130 | 64 | 2007–present |
| 3 | Totchtawan Sripan | 110 | 19 | 1993–2009 |
| 4 | Piyapong Pue-on | 100 | 70 | 1981–1997 |
| 4 | Datsakorn Thonglao | 100 | 11 | 2003–2017 |
| 4 | **Theerathon Bunmathan** | 100 | 9 | 2010–present |
| 7 | **Sarach Yooyen** | 99 | 9 | 2013–present |
| 8 | Dusit Chalermsan | 97 | 14 | 1994–2004 |
| 9 | Niweat Siriwong | 87 | 3 | 1997–2012 |
| 9 | Natee Thongsookkaew | 87 | 1 | 1986–2000 |

=== Top goalscorers ===
| Rank | Player | Goals | Caps | Ratio | Career |
|---|---|---|---|---|---|
| 1 | Kiatisuk Senamuang | 71 | 134 | 0.53 | 1993–2007 |
| 2 | Piyapong Pue-on | 70 | 100 | 0.7 | 1981–1997 |
| 3 | **Teerasil Dangda** | 64 | 130 | 0.49 | 2007–present |
| 4 | Sarayuth Chaikamdee | 31 | 49 | 0.63 | 2003–2011 |
| 5 | Vithoon Kijmongkolsak | 29 | 84 | 0.35 | 1985–1995 |
| 6 | Worrawoot Srimaka | 28 | 63 | 0.44 | 1995–2003 |
| 6 | Daoyod Dara | 28 | 70 | 0.4 | 1975–1986 |
| 6 | Niwat Srisawat | 28 | 85 | 0.33 | 1967–1979 |
| 9 | Jedsadaphon Na Phatthalung | 27 | 79 | 0.34 | 1971–1981 |
| 10 | Suttha Sudsa-ard | 25 | 51 | 0.49 | 1978–1988 |
| 10 | Natipong Sritong-In | 25 | 55 | 0.45 | 1994–1997 |
| 10 | Chalor Hongkajorn | 25 | 67 | 0.37 | 1979–1987 |

== Thai League 1 records ==
=== All-time top scorers ===
As of 5 June 2025

| Rank | Player | Years | Goals | Apps | Ratio |
|---|---|---|---|---|---|
| 1 | (Brazil) Heberty Fernandes | 2014–2023 | 159 | 249 | 0.64 |
| 2 | (Thailand) **Teerasil Dangda** | 2009–2017, 2019, 2021– | 146 | 351 | 0.43 |
| 3 | (Brazil) Cleiton Silva | 2010–2019 | 144 | 193 | 0.73 |
| 4 | (Brazil) Diogo Luis Santo | 2015–2022 | 118 | 132 | 0.89 |
| 5 | (Montenegro) Dragan Boškovic | 2013–2021 | 118 | 209 | 0.56 |
| 6 | (Brazil) Leandro Assumpcao | 2011–2021 | 116 | 227 | 0.51 |
| 7 | (Thailand) Pipob On-Mo | 2006–2019 | 108 | 404 | 0.27 |
| 8 | (Thailand) Sarayuth Chaikamdee | 2001–2004, 2007–2013–2014 | 101 | 233 | 0.43 |
| 9 | (Thailand) Teeratep Winothai | 2006–2014, 2016–2022 | 96 | 206 | 0.47 |
| 10 | (North Macedonia) Mario Gjurovski | 2012–2019 | 93 | 197 | 0.47 |

Figures for active players (in bold).

=== Most appearances ===
As of 5 June 2025

| Rank | Player | Position | Apps | Goals |
|---|---|---|---|---|
| 1 | (Thailand) Rangsan Viwatchaichok | MF | 439 | 49 |
| 2 | (Thailand) Siwarak Tedsungnoen | GK | 433 | 0 |
| 3 | (Thailand) Pipob On-Mo | FW | 402 | 108 |
| 4 | (Thailand) Sinthaweechai Hathairattanakool | GK | 397 | 1 |
| 5 | (Thailand) **Teerasil Dangda** | FW | 351 | 146 |
| 6 | (Thailand) Pichitphong Choeichiu | MF | 340 | 62 |
| 7 | (Thailand) Nattaporn Phanrit | DF | 335 | 19 |
| 8 | (Thailand) Narit Taweekul | GK | 315 | 1 |
| 9 | (Thailand) Apichet Puttan | DF | 262 | 7 |
| 10 | (Brazil) Heberty | FW | 249 | 159 |

Figures for active players (in bold).

=== Player statistics ===
- Youngest player: Suphanat Mueanta (Buriram United) – 15 years, 8 months and 22 days (25 April 2018, Buriram United 2–1 Nakhon Ratchasima, 2018 Thai League 1)
- Oldest player: Somchai Subpherm (TOT) – 51 years, 7 months and 25 days (3 November 2013, Buriram United 2–1 TOT, 2013 Thai Premier League)
- Youngest scorer: Suphanat Mueanta (Buriram United) – 15 years, 9 months and 25 days (26 May 2018, Buriram United 5–0 Air Force Central, 2018 Thai League 1)
- Oldest scorer: Hiromichi Katano (Rayong) – 42 years, 6 months and 15 days (21 October 2024, Rayong 3–1 Nongbua Pitchaya, 2024–25 Thai League 1)
- Fastest scorer: Nirut Kamsawad (Port Authority) – 9 seconds (2001–02 Thai League)
- Most consecutive matches scored: 10 games – Diogo Luís Santo (Buriram United) (24 September 2017 – 2 March 2018, 2018 Thai League 1)
- Most consecutive unconceded matches: 8 games
  - Siwarak Tedsungnoen (Buriram United, 2011)
- All-time most clean sheets: 815 minutes – Siwarak Tedsungnoen
- Most goals in a season: 38 goals – Dragan Bošković (Bangkok United, 2017)
- Most assists in a season: 19 assists – Theerathon Bunmathan (Buriram United, 2015)
- Most titles won: 10 times – Siwarak Tedsungnoen
- Most seasons appeared: 21 seasons – Siwarak Tedsungnoen (2003/04–2024/25)
- All-time record for highest football transfer fee Thai players: 68 million baht – Chanathip Songkrasin (2023)

=== All-time Thai League 1 table ===
The all-time Thai League 1 table is a cumulative record of all match results, points, and goals of every team that has played in the Thai League 1 since its inception in 1996. The table that follows is accurate as of the end of the 2025–26 season. Teams in bold are part of the 2026–27 Thai League 1.

| Pos. | Club | Seasons | Pld | W | D | L | GF | GA | GD | Pts | Best Pos. |
|---|---|---|---|---|---|---|---|---|---|---|---|
| 1 | **Buriram United** (Note: also including the results as PEA FC and Buriram PEA.) | 21 | 640 | 395 | 145 | 100 | 1,262 | 554 | +708 | **1,330** | 1st |
| 2 | **Port** (Note: also including the results as Port Authority of Thailand, Thai Port, and Singhtarua.) | 27 | 758 | 310 | 191 | 257 | 1,108 | 953 | +155 | **1,112** (Note: In the 2014 season, Muangthong United and Singhtarua received a nine-point penalty following a fight between their fans) | 2nd |
| 3 | Police Tero (Note: also including the results as Tero Sasana and BEC Tero Sasana.) | 26 | 730 | 291 | 210 | 229 | 1,081 | 935 | +146 | **1,083** | 1st |
| 4 | Muangthong United | 17 | 541 | 297 | 124 | 120 | 1,005 | 605 | +400 | **1,006** | 1st |
| 5 | **Chonburi** | 19 | 593 | 273 | 164 | 156 | 924 | 707 | +217 | **983** | 1st |
| 6 | **Bangkok United** (Note: also including the results as Bangkok University.) | 20 | 591 | 275 | 153 | 163 | 956 | 720 | +236 | **978** | 1st |
| 7 | **BG Pathum United** (Note: also including the results as Bangkok Glass.) | 16 | 511 | 238 | 132 | 141 | 829 | 603 | +226 | **846** | 1st |
| 8 | Super Power Samut Prakan (Note: also including the results as Osotspa, Osotspa M-150 Saraburi, and Osotspa M-150 Samut Prakan.) | 20 | 555 | 188 | 172 | 195 | 727 | 810 | −83 | **736** | 2nd |
| 9 | **Chiangrai United** | 15 | 481 | 186 | 136 | 159 | 655 | 629 | +26 | **694** | 1st |
| 10 | **Ratchaburi** | 13 | 412 | 168 | 104 | 140 | 625 | 534 | +91 | **608** | 3rd |
| 11 | TOT (Note: also including the results as TOT-CAT.) | 17 | 472 | 144 | 129 | 199 | 526 | 659 | −133 | **561** | 2nd |
| 12 | Army United (Note: also including the results as Royal Thai Army.) | 14 | 411 | 132 | 112 | 171 | 520 | 602 | −82 | **508** | 5th |
| 13 | Suphanburi | 11 | 345 | 116 | 91 | 138 | 435 | 466 | −31 | **439** | 3rd |
| 14 | Navy (Note: also including the results as Royal Thai Navy, Rajnavy Rayong, and Siam Navy.) | 14 | 393 | 99 | 104 | 190 | 392 | 600 | −208 | **401** | 6th |
| 15 | Bangkok Bank | 12 | 280 | 100 | 100 | 80 | 339 | 306 | +33 | **400** | 3rd (Note: Despite Bangkok Bank never finished first in the Thai League 1 but they be the league winner in 1996-97 season because in that season the league winner was determined by using championship playoff.) |
| 16 | TTM Thailand Tobacco Monopoly (Note: also including the results as TTM Samut Sakhon, TTM Phichit, and TTM Chiangmai.) | 12 | 320 | 90 | 107 | 123 | 342 | 413 | −71 | **377** | 1st |
| 17 | Nakhon Ratchasima | 10 | 313 | 96 | 82 | 135 | 350 | 478 | −128 | **370** | 7th |
| 18 | Pattaya United (Note: also including the results as Coke-Bangpra.) | 9 | 289 | 96 | 74 | 119 | 362 | 419 | −57 | **362** | 4th |
| 19 | BBCU (Note: also including the results as Sinthana, Chula-Sinthana, and Chula United.) | 12 | 304 | 89 | 87 | 128 | 368 | 465 | −97 | **354** | 1st |
| 20 | Krung Thai Bank | 11 | 258 | 90 | 74 | 94 | 323 | 329 | −6 | **344** | 1st |
| 21 | Air Force United (Note: also including the results as Royal Thai Air Force and Air Force Central.) | 10 | 252 | 90 | 66 | 96 | 352 | 364 | −12 | **336** | 1st |
| 22 | Police United (Note: also including the results as Royal Thai Police.) | 10 | 298 | 82 | 90 | 126 | 343 | 390 | −47 | **336** | 7th |
| 23 | **PT Prachuap** | 8 | 244 | 82 | 70 | 92 | 318 | 348 | −30 | **316** | 6th |
| 24 | **Sukhothai** | 9 | 279 | 79 | 79 | 121 | 365 | 466 | −101 | **316** | 7th |
| 25 | Chainat Hornbill (Note: also including the results as Chainat.) | 7 | 233 | 65 | 65 | 103 | 309 | 381 | −72 | **260** | 10th |
| 26 | Samut Songkhram | 7 | 228 | 62 | 64 | 102 | 206 | 300 | −94 | **250** | 7th |
| 27 | Sisaket (Note: also including the results as Esan United.) | 8 | 235 (Note: In 2013 the Football Association of Thailand found Esan United guilty of forging documents, causing the club return to Sisaket. Due to legal conflicts, Sisaket were suspended for the rest of the season but were not relegated.) | 61 | 67 | 107 | 272 | 383 | −111 | **250** | 6th |
| 28 | Thai Farmers Bank | 5 | 122 | 48 | 44 | 30 | 190 | 149 | +41 | **188** | 1st (Note: Despite Thai Farmers Bank finished first in the 1996-97 season but they did not be the league winner because in that season the league winner was determined by using championship playoff.) |
| 29 | RBAC (Note: played Thai League 1 under name of Stock Exchange of Thailand, Bangkok Metropolitan Administration, and Rattana Bundit.) | 6 | 144 | 48 | 44 | 36 | 184 | 170 | +14 | **188** | 4th |
| 30 | Nakhon Pathom United (Note: also including the results as Nakhon Pathom.) | 5 | 150 | 38 | 41 | 71 | 153 | 232 | −79 | **155** | 9th |
| 31 | **Lamphun Warriors** | 4 | 120 | 31 | 44 | 45 | 143 | 169 | −26 | **137** | 8th |
| 32 | Khon Kaen United | 4 | 120 | 29 | 36 | 55 | 119 | 211 | −92 | **123** | 8th |
| 33 | Samut Prakan City | 3 | 90 | 32 | 22 | 36 | 131 | 143 | −12 | **118** | 6th |
| 34 | Songkhla United (Note: also including the results as Wuachon United.) | 3 | 104 | 24 | 33 | 47 | 115 | 173 | −58 | **105** | 12th |
| 35 | Rajpracha | 3 | 78 | 26 | 25 | 27 | 116 | 118 | −2 | **103** | 5th |
| 36 | **Uthai Thani** | 3 | 90 | 25 | 28 | 37 | 115 | 134 | −19 | **103** | 7th |
| 37 | Nongbua Pitchaya | 3 | 90 | 24 | 23 | 43 | 106 | 144 | −38 | **95** | 6th |
| 38 | **Rayong** | 3 | 90 | 21 | 21 | 48 | 109 | 177 | −68 | **84** | 9th |
| 39 | Thai Honda (Note: also including the results as Thai Honda Ladkrabang.) | 3 | 86 | 19 | 21 | 46 | 92 | 132 | −40 | **78** | 11th |
| 40 | Trat | 3 | 90 | 19 | 21 | 50 | 118 | 175 | −57 | **78** | 10th |
| 41 | PTT Rayong | 2 | 68 | 19 | 20 | 29 | 82 | 106 | −24 | **77** | 11th |
| 42 | Ubon United (Note: played Thai League 1 under name of Ubon UMT United.) | 2 | 68 | 18 | 19 | 31 | 94 | 112 | −18 | **73** | 10th |
| 43 | Sriracha | 2 | 64 | 15 | 17 | 32 | 60 | 77 | −17 | **62** | 14th |
| 44 | Saraburi | 1 | 34 | 8 | 11 | 15 | 41 | 56 | −15 | **35** | 14th |
| 45 | Bangkok Bank of Commerce | 2 | 56 | 7 | 13 | 36 | 45 | 112 | −67 | **34** | 12th |
| 46 | **Ayutthaya United** | 1 | 30 | 8 | 8 | 14 | 34 | 50 | −16 | **32** | 10th |
| 47 | Raj-Vithi | 1 | 34 | 8 | 8 | 18 | 43 | 71 | −28 | **32** | 16th |
| 48 | Chiangmai | 1 | 30 | 7 | 7 | 16 | 39 | 62 | −23 | **28** | 16th |
| 49 | Khon Kaen | 1 | 34 | 6 | 9 | 19 | 33 | 68 | −35 | **27** | 18th |
| 50 | Kanchanaburi Power | 1 | 30 | 4 | 11 | 15 | 29 | 54 | −25 | **23** | 16th |
| 51 | Customs United (Note: played Thai League 1 under name of Customs Department.) | 1 | 30 | 5 | 5 | 20 | 18 | 39 | −21 | **20** | 16th |
| 52 | Chiangmai United | 1 | 30 | 4 | 7 | 19 | 28 | 56 | −28 | **19** | 16th |
| 53 | Lampang | 1 | 30 | 4 | 7 | 19 | 24 | 60 | −36 | **19** | 16th |
| 54 | Bangkok Christian College | 1 | 18 | 2 | 3 | 13 | 16 | 44 | −28 | **9** | 10th |
| 55 | Thamrongthai | 1 | 34 | 1 | 6 | 27 | 26 | 101 | −75 | **9** | 18th |
| – | **Pattani** | – | – | – | – | – | – | – | – | – | – |
| – | **Rasisalai United** | – | – | – | – | – | – | – | – | – | – |
| – | **Sisaket United** | – | – | – | – | – | – | – | – | – | – |

League or status in 2026–27 Season:

| 2024–25 Thai League 1 teams |
| 2024–25 Thai League 2 teams |
| 2024–25 Thai League 3 teams |
| Thailand Semi-pro League teams |
| Defunct or dissolved teams |

== AFC Champions League Elite ==
=== Participations ===
| Team | Qualified | Group Stage Qualified | 2024–25 | 2025–26 |
|---|---|---|---|---|
| Buriram United | 2 Times | 2 Times | QF | QF |
| Bangkok United | 2 Times | 0 Time | Q | Q |

Q: Qualifying stage, GS: Group Stage, R16: Round of 16, QF: Quarterfinals, SF: Semifinal, RU: Runner-up, W: Winner

== Asian Champions League ==
=== Participations ===
A total of eleven clubs represented Thailand in the AFC Champions League which change name in 2024 (see: AFC Champions League Elite).

| Team | Qualified | Group Stage Qualified | 2002-03 | 2004 | 2005 | 2006 | 2007 | 2008 | 2009 | 2010 | 2011 | 2012 | 2013 | 2014 | 2015 | 2016 | 2017 | 2018 | 2019 | 2020 | 2021 | 2022 | 2023–24 |
|---|---|---|---|---|---|---|---|---|---|---|---|---|---|---|---|---|---|---|---|---|---|---|---|
| Provincial Electricity Authority/ Buriram United | 11 Times | 8 Times | | | | | | | Q | | | GS | QF | GS | GS | GS | | R16 | GS | Q | | Q | GS |
| BEC Tero Sasana | 3 Times | 3 Times | RU | GS | GS |
| Krung Thai Bank | 3 Times | 3 Times | | GS | GS | | | GS |
| Muangthong United | 7 Times | 2 Times | | | | | | | | Q | Q | | GS | Q | | Q | R16 | Q |
| Bangkok University/ Bangkok United | 4 Times | 2 Time | | | | | GS | | | | | | | | | | Q | | Q | | | | R16 |
| Chiangrai United | 5 Times | 3 Times | | | | | | | | | | | | | | | | Q | Q | GS | GS | GS |
| Chonburi | 4 Times | 1 Time | | | | | | GS | | | | | | Q | Q | Q |
| Osotsapa | 1 Time | 1 Time | GS |
| Sukhothai | 1 Time | 0 Time | | | | | | | | | | | | | | | Q |
| Port | 4 Times | 1 Time | | | | | | | | | | | | | | | | | | Q | GS | Q | Q |
| Bangkok Glass/BG Pathum United | 4 Times | 3 Times | | | | | | | | | | | | | Q | | | | | | R16 | QF | GS |

Q: Qualifying stage, GS: Group Stage, R16: Round of 16, QF: Quarterfinals, SF: Semifinal, RU: Runner-up, W: Winner

== Asian Club Championship ==
=== Participations ===
A total of seven clubs represented Thailand in the AFC Asian Club Championship which became defunct in 2002 (see: AFC Champions League).

| Team | Qualified | Seasons |
|---|---|---|
| Bangkok Bank | 9 Times | 1967, 1969, 1971, 1985-86, 1987-88, 1990-91, 1994-95, 1995-96, 1997-98 |
| Thai Farmers Bank | 5 Times | 1992-93, 1993-94 (W), 1994-95 (W), 1995-96, 1996-97 |
| BEC Tero Sasana | 2 Times | 1998-99, 2001-02 |
| Port Authority of Thailand | 2 Times | 1986-87, 1991-92 |
| Royal Thai Air Force | 2 Times | 1988-89, 2000-01 |
| Royal Thai Police | 1 Time | 1970 |
| Sinthana | 1 Time | 1999-2000 |

W: Winner

== AFC Champions League Two ==
=== Participations ===
| Team | Qualified | 2024–25 | 2025–26 |
|---|---|---|---|
| Bangkok United | 2 Time | R16 | QF |
| Port | 1 Time | R16 |
| Muangthong United | 1 Time | R16 |
| BG Pathum United | 1 Time | | GS |
| Ratchaburi | 1 Time | | QF |

GS: Group stage, R16: Round of 16, QF: Quarterfinals, SF: Semifinal, RU: Runner-up, W: Winner

== AFC Cup ==
=== Participations ===
Thai clubs history of playing in the AFC Cup, Osotsapa were the first side to take part since the competition started in 2004. After the revamping of the Champions League in 2009, Thai clubs once again entered.

| Team | Qualified | 2004 | 2005 | 2006 | 2007 | 2008 | 2009 | 2010 | 2011 | 2012 |
|---|---|---|---|---|---|---|---|---|---|---|
| Chonburi | 3 Time | | | | | | Q | | Q | S |
| Osotsapa | 1 Time | | | | G |
| Muangthong United | 2 Time | | | | | | | S | Q |
| PEA | 1 Time | | | | | | G |
| Thai Port | 1 Time | | | | | | | Q |

G: Group round, Q: Quarterfinals, S: Semifinal, R: Runner-up, W: Winner

== Asian Cup Winners Cup ==
=== Participations ===
The Asian Cup Winner Cup started in 1991, although Thai clubs did not enter until 1995. There was no Thai entrant in 1997. The competition became defunct in 2002. Thai clubs generally entered at the 2nd round.

| Team | Qualified | 1995 | 1996 | 1998 | 1999 | 2000 | 2001 | 2002 |
|---|---|---|---|---|---|---|---|---|
| TOT | 1 Time | S |
| Raj Pracha | 1 Time | | 2 |
| Royal Thai Air Force | 2 Times | | | 2 | | | | 2 |
| Sinthana | 1 Time | | | | 2 |
| Bangkok Bank | 1 Time | | | | | S |
| BEC Tero Sasana | 1 Time | | | | | | Q |

2: 2nd round, Q: Quarterfinals, S: Semifinal, R: Runner-up, W: Winner
