= 2009 Thai Division 1 League =

Thai Division 1 League
- Season: 2009
- Champions: Police United
- Promoted: Police United; Royal Thai Army; Sisaket
- Relegated: Surat Thani; Thai Airways-Ban Bueng; Nakhon Sawan
- Top goalscorer: Wutthipong Kerdkul (Rattana Bundit) (27)
- Biggest home win: Police United 16-1 Nakhon Sawan
- Biggest away win: Nakhon Sawan 0-8 Royal Thai Air Force
- Highest scoring: Police United 16-1 Nakhon Sawan

The 2009 Thai League Division 1 has 16 teams.

== Rules ==
- Teams play each other twice on a home and away basis
- 3 Points for a win
- 1 Point for a draw
- Teams finishing on same points at the end of the season use head-to-head record to determine finishing position.
- The top three teams will be promoted to Premier League.
- The top team as champions.
- The bottom three teams will be relegated to Division 2.

== Prize money ==
- Champion : 700,000 Baht
- Runner-up : 300,000 Baht
- Third Place : 200,000 Baht
- Fourth Place : 100,000 Baht
- Fifth Place : 50,000 Baht
- Sixth Place : 40,000 Baht
- Seventh Place : 20,000 Baht

== Member clubs ==
=== Stadia and locations ===
Locations of the 2009 Thai Division 1 League teams
Football clubs in Bangkok Metropolitan Region

Club	Province	Home stadium	Capacity	
Chanthaburi	Chanthaburi	Chanthaburi Province Stadium	3,500	
Khonkaen	Khon Kaen	Khon Kaen Province Stadium	?	
Nakhon Sawan	Nakhon Sawan	Nakhon Sawan Sport School Stadium		Army Welfare Department Promoted from 2008 Thailand Division 2 League Nakhon Sawan Reprieve after Army Welfare Department withdrew
Customs Department	Min Buri, Bangkok	Kasem Bundit University Stadium	2,000	Relegated from Thailand Premier League
Prachinburi	Prachinburi	Prachinburi Province Stadium	3,196	Promoted from 2008 Thailand Division 2 League
PTT	Chonburi	Chonburi Physical Education Institute Stadium	12,000	
Rattana Bundit	Bangkok	RBAC University Stadium	?	
Royal Thai Air Force	Pathum Thani	Thupatemee Stadium	20,000	
Royal Thai Army	Bangkok	Thai Army Sports Stadium	20,000	Relegated from Thailand Premier League
Police United	Bangkok	Klong Chan Sports Center		
Songkhla	Songkhla	Jiranakorn Stadium	20,000	Promoted from 2008 Thailand Division 2 League
Sisaket	Sisaket	Sri Nakhon Lamduan Stadium	9,773	Promoted from Thailand Division 2 League
Suphanburi	Suphan Buri	Suphanburi Municipality Stadium	25,000	
Surat Thani	Surat Thani	Surat Thani Province Stadium	10,000	
Thai Airways-Ban Bueng	Chonburi	Beer Chang Stadium	3,518	
Thai Honda	Bangkok	72-years Anniversary Stadium	5,000	Won pre-season Playoff

Bangkok Bank FC were relegated from the Thailand Premier League, but withdrew from the league and folded before the season began. The Thai FA decided that, in order to keep the league at 16 teams, they would run a pre-season competition featuring the four relegated clubs from the Thailand Division 1 League 2008 season: Thai Honda won the competition.

== Pre Season Playoff ==
The winners of the Pre Season Playoff would fill the void left by Bangkok Bank FC, after they withdrew from the league after being relegated from the Thailand Premier League.

The four semi finalist's in the play-offs, are the four relegated clubs from the 2008 season of the Thailand Division 1 League.

=== Bracket ===
Semi-finals
25 January 2009 – Bangkok
Thai Honda	1
Raj Vithi	0
25 January 2009 – Phichit
Phitsanulok	1
Nakhon Sawan	2

Final
1 February 2009 – Bangkok
Thai Honda	4
Nakhon Sawan	0

==== Semi finals ====
2009-01-25
18:00 UTC+7

Thai Honda	1-0	Raj Vithi

72-years Anniversary Stadium

2009-01-25
16:00 UTC+7

Phitsanulok	1-2	Nakhon Sawan

Phichit Stadium

==== Final ====
2009-02-01
18:00 UTC+7

Thai Honda	4-0	Nakhon Sawan
Sutin Anukoon 35'; Chommanan Sookkaserm 76', 79'; Prasert Rookprailee 85'

72-years Anniversary Stadium

== Final league table ==
Clubs outside Bangkok

Clubs from the greater area of Bangkok

Pos	Team	Pld	W	D	L	GF	GA	GD	Pts	Promotion or relegation
1	Police United	30	19	8	3	76	25	+51	65	Champion and promotion spot for the Premier League
2	Royal Thai Army (R)	30	18	8	4	55	18	+37	62	Promotion spot for the Premier League
3	Sisaket (P)	30	15	13	2	53	26	+27	58	Promotion spot for the Premier League
4	Khonkaen	30	16	7	7	49	36	+13	55	
5	Prachinburi (P)	30	13	5	12	34	30	+4	44	
6	Royal Thai Air Force	30	12	6	12	45	36	+9	42 (Note: Head to Head: draw 1-1)	
7	Songkhla (P)	30	10	12	8	32	29	+3	42	
8	Rattana Bundit	30	11	8	11	58	56	+2	41	
9	Customs Department (R)	30	9	11	10	33	36	−3	38	
10	PTT FC	30	9	9	12	53	49	+4	36 (Note: PTT win 4-2)	
11	Thai Honda	30	8	12	10	30	35	−5	36	
12	Suphanburi	30	9	6	15	40	50	−10	33	
13	Chanthaburi	30	8	8	14	50	61	−11	32	
14	Surat Thani	30	8	6	16	39	58	−19	30 (Note: Head to Head: Surat Thani win 4-1)	Relegation spots to Division 2
15	Thai Airways-Ban Bueng	30	7	9	14	36	50	−14	30	Relegation spots to Division 2
16	Nakhon Sawan	30	1	6	23	34	122	−88	9	Relegation spots to Division 2

Rules for classification: 1st points; 2nd head-to-head; 3rd match win; 4th goal difference; 5th goals scored
(P) Promoted; (R) Relegated

== Results ==
Home \ Away	NKS	CHB	CUS	KHK	PRB	PTT	RTB	RTA	ARM	POL	SKL	SIS	SPB	SUR	AIR	HON
Nakhon Sawan		2–7	0–3	1–6	1–1	2–2	2–3	0–8	0–5	0–3	0–0	3–5	2–3	1–3	1–1	0–3
Chanthaburi	4–3		1–1	4–2	3–2	5–3	1–1	1–0	2–2	2–3	1–2	1–3	2–1	3–2	2–2	1–2
Customs	3–1	2–0		0–2	1–0	1–1	3–2	1–1	0–0	0–0	1–1	0–0	0–1	2–2	4–2	2–0
Khonkaen	0–0	3–2	1–0		1–0	2–1	0–1	3–0	1–0	1–1	1–1	2–2	5–3	1–0	1–0	1–1
Prachinburi	5–0	1–0	1–0	0–1		1–0	3–1	0–0	1–0	1–0	1–0	2–0	1–0	1–0	1–1	2–0
PTT	6–1	1–1	5–1	3–4	2–3		2–1	0–3	0–2	2–3	1–1	0–0	2–1	3–0	3–1	1–1
Rattana Bundit	6–2	5–1	1–1	0–2	2–0	4–2		1–0	2–4	1–2	1–1	3–3	0–1	2–2	4–3	1–0
Air Force	4–3	3–1	0–1	2–0	1–0	4–1	2–0		1–1	2–3	1–0	0–4	0–0	2–0	1–1	5–1
Army	10–0	1–0	2–0	1–0	2–1	1–0	1–1	2–2		0–0	1–0	1–2	3–0	3–0	3–1	1–0
Police	16–1	3–0	3–1	3–1	3–0	2–2	2–1	2–0	2–1		3–0	1–2	2–0	4–1	1–1	2–0
Songkhla	4–1	1–1	0–0	2–1	2–1	1–0	2–2	0–1	1–1	3–1		1–1	1–0	1–0	1–0	1–1
Sisaket	2–1	0–0	5–1	2–2	3–1	0–0	5–1	3–0	0–0	1–1	0–0		1–0	3–1	1–0	0–0
Suphanburi	1–3	4–2	2–1	3–0	3–3	0–0	2–4	3–1	0–1	1–3	1–0	1–2		2–2	2–3	0–0
Surat Thani	2–2	2–2	0–2	2–3	0–0	2–3	5–4	1–0	0–1	0–7	1–2	2–0	4–2		2–0	0–1
Thai Airways	3–1	1–0	1–0	1–1	1–0	0–4	1–2	2–1	0–1	0–0	4–3	0–2	1–2	1–2		3–3
Thai Honda	3–0	3–0	1–1	0–1	2–1	1–3	1–1	1–0	1–4	0–0	1–0	1–1	1–1	0–1	1–1	

Source: Football Association of Thailand website
Legend: Blue = home team win; Yellow = draw; Red = away team win.

== Top scorers ==
Last updated October 17, 2009

Scorer	Goals	Team
(Thailand) Wutthipong Kerdkul	27	Rattana Bundit
(Thailand) Manit Noywech	24	Police United
(Thailand) Jirawut Saranan	20	PTT
(Thailand) Sirisak Musbu-ngor	17	Chanthaburi
(Thailand) Tatree Seeha	17	Royal Thai Army
(Thailand) Piroj Anantanarong	16	Sisaket
(Thailand) Arnon Buspha	13	Nakhon Sawan
(Thailand) Choklap Nilsang	12	Customs Department
(Thailand) Eakarthit Somjit	12	Police United
(Thailand) Sarawut Vichien	12	Khonkaen
(Thailand) Phuritad Jarikanon	11	Thai Airways-Ban Bueng
(Thailand) Rermrat Ngamchareon	11	Khonkaen
(Thailand) Witthawat Iamram	11	Songkhla
(Thailand) Mongkol Tossakrai	10	Royal Thai Army
(Thailand) Jakkrapong Somboon	9	Royal Thai Army
(Thailand) Sutin Anukoon	9	Thai Honda
(Thailand) Charin Bood-Hard	8	Khonkaen

== See also ==
- 2009 Thai Premier League
- 2009 Regional League Division 2
- 2009 Thai FA Cup
- 2009 Kor Royal Cup
