= 2008 Thailand League Division 2 (Group A) =

Thailand Division 2 League Group A 2008
- Season: 2008
- Champions: Prachinburi FC
- Promoted: Prachinburi FC; Songkhla FC
- Biggest home win: Nakhon Ratchasima FC 6-0 Cha Choeng Sao FC
- Biggest away win: Satun FC 1-6 Samut Prakan FC
- Highest scoring: Sakon Nakon FC 2-6 Satun FC 8 Goals

The 2008 Thailand League Division 2 Group A had 11 teams.

The league winners and runners up were promoted to Thailand Division 1 League. No teams would be relegated due to restructuring at the end of the season.

== Member clubs ==
- Cha Choeng Sao FC (Relegation from Thailand Division 1 League 2007 11th Group B)
- Chiang Mai FC
- Nakhon Ratchasima FC (Relegation from Thailand Division 1 League 2007 9th Group B)
- Narathiwat FC (Relegation from Thailand Division 1 League 2007 8th Group A)
- Prachinburi FC
- Raj Pracha FC (Promoted 2007-08 Khǒr Royal Cup (ถ้วย ข.) Winner)
- Ratchaburi FC (Relegation from Thailand Division 1 League 2007 12th Group A)
- Sakon Nakhon FC (Relegation from 2007 Thailand Division 1 League 10th Group A)
- Samut Prakan FC
- Satun FC
- Songkhla FC (promoted from Provincial League 2007 Runner Up)

== Stadium and locations ==
Locations of the 2008 Thailand League Division 2 (Group A) teams
Football clubs in Bangkok Metropolitan Region

Team	Location	Stadium	Capacity
Cha Choeng Sao	Chachoengsao	Chachoengsao Town municipality Stadium	?
Chiangmai United	Chiang Mai	Chiangmai Municipality Stadium	?
Nakhon Ratchasima	Nakhon Ratchasima	Nakhon Ratchasima Municipality Stadium	?
Narathiwat	Narathiwat	Narathiwat Province Stadium	?
Prachinburi	Prachinburi	Prachinburi Province Stadium	?
Raj Pracha	Huai Khwang, Bangkok	Thai Bev Huai Khwang football field	?
Ratchaburi	Ratchaburi	Ratchaburi Province Stadium	?
Samut Prakan	Samut Prakan	Sit Chaiyasam Football Field	?
Sakon Nakhon	Sakon Nakhon	Sakolrajwittayanukul School	?
Satun	Satun	Satun Province Stadium	?
Songkhla	Hat Yai, Songkhla	Jiranakorn Stadium	?

== Final league table ==
Pos	Team	Pld	W	D	L	GF	GA	GD	Pts
1	Prachinburi FC	20	12	5	3	39	18	+21	41
2	Songkhla FC	20	11	4	5	27	17	+10	37
3	Narathiwat FC	20	10	7	3	26	17	+9	37
4	Nakhon Ratchasima FC	20	9	4	7	36	19	+17	31
5	Samut Prakan FC	20	8	7	5	30	21	+9	31
6	Raj Pracha FC	20	8	7	5	21	20	+1	31
7	Ratchaburi FC	20	7	9	4	32	26	+6	30
8	Cha Choeng Sao FC	20	6	5	9	17	32	−15	23
9	Chiang Mai FC	20	3	6	11	25	34	−9	15
10	Satun FC	20	3	4	13	26	46	−20	13
11	Sakon Nakon FC	20	1	6	13	15	43	−28	9

Source: rsssf.com

== Results ==
Home \ Away	CCS	CGM	NKR	NRW	PRB	RPR	RTB	SNK	SPR	STN	SKL
Cha Choeng Sao FC		1–0	0–0	1–1	0–3	1–3	3–3	2–1	1–0	2–1	0–1
Chiang Mai FC	3–0		3–1	1–2	2–5	0–1	2–3	2–2	1–2	2–1	0–1
Nakhon Ratchasima FC	6–0	1–1		2–1	1–1	1–2	1–1	6–1	1–2	4–1	1–0
Narathiwat FC	1–0	2–1	1–0		0–2	1–1	1–1	3–0	1–0	1–0	1–2
Prachinburi FC	2–0	1–1	2–1	2–2		2–0	0–1	4–1	2–2	2–0	1–0
Raj Pracha FC	0–1	1–1	0–4	1–1	1–3		0–0	2–0	2–1	0–0	2–1
Ratchaburi FC	3–1	1–0	1–0	2–2	3–3	1–0		1–1	1–1	2–2	0–1
Sakon Nakon FC	0–0	2–2	0–2	0–1	0–1	0–2	3–2		0–3	2–6	0–1
Samut Prakan FC	0–0	3–1	2–1	0–1	1–0	0–0	2–1	1–1		1–3	2–2
Satun FC	2–3	1–1	1–2	0–2	0–3	2–3	0–4	1–1	1–6		2–1
Songkhla FC	2–1	3–1	0–1	1–1	2–0	0–0	3–1	1–0	1–1	4–2	

Legend: Blue = home team win; Yellow = draw; Red = away team win.

== See also ==
- 2008 Thailand Premier League
- 2008 Thailand League Division 1
- 2008 Thailand League Division 2
- 2008 Thailand League Division 2 (Group B)
- Thailand 2008 RSSSF
