= Prime Bangkok F.C. =

Thai football club

Prime Bangkok พราม แบงค็อก
- Full name: Prime Bangkok Football Club
- Nickname: The Thunder Eagles
- Founded: 2006; 20 years ago as Bangkok North Central ASSN; 2016; 10 years ago as Air Force Robinson; 2020; 6 years ago as Prime Bangkok
- Ground: NT Stadium; Lak Si, Bangkok, Thailand
- Capacity: 5,000
- Chairman: Kittiratt Na-Ranong
- Head coach: Thanyaphon Khlaykam
- League: Thai League 3
- 2025–26: Thai League 3, 1st of 11 in the Central region
Home colours	Away colours

Prime Bangkok Football Club (Thai: สโมสรฟุตบอลพราม แบงค็อก) is a Thai football club based in Bangkok, playing home games at the Ramkhamhaeng University Stadium. The club is currently member of the Thai League 3 Central region.

== History ==
Thai football records are hard to come by but recent records do show that Central Lions first came to prominence in the 2007 season playing in the Thailand Division 1 League which was at the 2nd level in the Thai football league system and played under the name Bangkok North Central ASSN. They started the 2007 season in 2007 Group B which featured 12 teams, of which 5 teams would be relegated. Bangkok North Central filled the last relegation spot tied on 29 points with 3 other teams. Goal difference would be the deciding factor in the league and Bangkok North Central would lose out by 1 goal to Nakhon Sawan.

For the 2008 season, Bangkok would start in the Division 2 Group B League which had just been expanded to feature two groups of 11 teams, the top two of which would be promoted. Group B was also a generally pro Bangkok league compared to Group A, therefore many of the sides would be either university or college sides. Bangkok would be a tough team to break down that season and only lost on four occasions, the hard part for them was scoring goals and converting draws into victories. They duly came 6th, 9 points behind the promotion places.

In 2009, Thai football was once again in a restructuring phase. The 2nd division would be renamed the Regional League Division 2 and Bangkok would start life in the Bangkok Area Division, again a league that generally features university and college sides. One promotion spot would be up for grabs as there would be 5 regional leagues in total. Bangkok would come 3rd, but a long way behind the league winners Raj Pracha. 2009 also saw Bangkok enter the FA Cup for the first time but they were knocked out of the first qualifying round by Thai Summit Samut Prakan who played in the Central/East regional league.

In 2010, it was to be a bad year for Bangkok, they came 12th out of 13 in the Bangkok regional league and also went out of the newly formed Thai League Cup in the first qualifying round. They were relegated from the 2010 Thai Division 2 League Bangkok & field Region league but came back to prominence in the 2012 Thai Division 2 League Bangkok & field Region and were known as Central Lions and played at the Rajamangala University of Technology in Thanyaburi District.

In 2016, this club was taken over by Air Force Central F.C. and this club is the reserve Air Force Central F.C. team.

In 2017, they came back to compete in the 2017 Thailand Amateur League Bangkok Metropolitan Region.

In 2020, this club was taken over and renamed to Prime Bangkok Football Club.

In 2022, Prime Bangkok competed in the Thai League 3 for the 2022–23 season. It is their 5th season in the professional league. The club started the season with a 2–1 away win over STK Muangnont and they ended the season with a 2–0 home win over STK Muangnont. The club has finished 4th place in the league of the Bangkok metropolitan region. In addition, in the 2022–23 Thai FA Cup Prime Bangkok was defeated 1–2 by Phrae United in the fourth round, causing them to be eliminated and in the 2022–23 Thai League Cup Prime Bangkok was defeated 1–2 by Nonthaburi United S.Boonmeerit in the second qualification round, causing them to be eliminated too.

=== Crest history ===
2020–Present

== Stadium and locations ==
Coordinates	Location	Stadium	Year
13°46′41″N 100°38′42″E	Bangkok (Bang Kapi)	Klong Chan Sports Center	2007
14°00′22″N 100°40′23″E	Pathum Thani (Thanyaburi)	North Bangkok University Stadium (Rangsit)	2008
14°01′41″N 100°43′33″E	Pathum Thani (Thanyaburi)	Queen Sirikit 60th Anniversary Stadium	2009
13°48′07″N 100°47′27″E	Bangkok (Min Buri)	72nd Anniversary Stadium (Min Buri)	2010
13°47′48″N 100°17′53″E	Nakhon Pathom	Rajamangala University of Technology Rattanakosin Stadium (Salaya)	2012
13°57′04″N 100°37′28″E	Pathum Thani (Lam Luk Ka)	Thupatemi Stadium	2012, 2018
13°52′06″N 100°50′49″E	Bangkok (Nong Chok)	BEC Tero Sasana Nong Chok Stadium	2012
14°10′09″N 100°31′44″E	Ayutthaya (Bang Sai)	Ratchakram Stadium	2016–2017
13°45′16″N 100°37′00″E	Bangkok (Bang Kapi)	Ramkhamhaeng University Stadium	2019–21, 2022–24
13°46′00″N 100°33′10″E	Bangkok (Din Daeng)	Thai-Japanese Stadium	2021–2022
13°52′02″N 100°34′39″E	Bangkok (Lak Si)	Boonyachinda Stadium	2024–present

== Seasons ==
Season	League									FA Cup	League Cup	T3 Cup	Top goalscorer	
Season	Division	P	W	D	L	F	A	Pts	Pos	FA Cup	League Cup	T3 Cup	Name	Goals
Bangkok North Central ASSN
2007	DIV1 B	22	9	2	11	30	35	29	8th	Opted out				
2008	DIV2 B	20	6	10	4	21	24	28	6th	Opted out				
2009	DIV2 Bangkok	18	2	4	12	18	36	10	10th	QR				
2010	DIV2 Bangkok	24	2	7	15	17	41	13	12th	Opted out	QR			
2011	Failing to meet licensing standard													
2012	DIV2 Bangkok	34	4	8	22	29	72	20	17th	Opted out	Opted out			
2013–2015	Request withdraw from competition for three years													
Air Force Robinson
2016	DIV2 Bangkok	20	2	5	13	17	36	11	11th	Opted out	Opted out			
2017	TA Bangkok	8	7	1	0	23	7	22	1st	Opted out	Ineligible		(Thailand) Patcharapon Usmali	4
2018	T4 Bangkok	22	6	5	11	16	27	23	9th	Opted out	QR1			
2019	T4 Bangkok	24	4	8	12	24	32	20	10th	Opted out	Opted out		(Thailand) Somprat Inthaphut	7
Prime Bangkok
2020–21	T3 Bangkok	20	8	9	3	26	24	33	5th	Opted out	Opted out		(Cameroon) Moussa Abakar	11
2021–22	T3 Bangkok	26	9	7	10	27	30	34	7th	R2	QRP		(Japan) Omae So	5
2022–23	T3 Bangkok	26	13	7	6	36	22	46	4th	R4	QR2		(Saint Kitts and Nevis) Tishan Tajahni Hanley	10
2023–24	T3 Bangkok	26	13	9	4	52	23	48	6th	R2	R1	QF	(Thailand) Chawanwit Saelao	24
2024–25	T3 Central	20	8	6	6	34	28	30	4th	R1	QRP	R16	(Thailand) Chawanwit Saelao	16
2025–26	T3 Central	20	14	5	1	47	14	47	1st	R3	QR1	R16	(Thailand) Chawanwit Saelao	18

Champions	Runners-up	Promoted	Relegated

== Players ==
=== Current squad ===
Note: Flags indicate national team as defined under FIFA eligibility rules; some limited exceptions apply. Players may hold more than one non-FIFA nationality.

No.	Pos.	Nation	Player
1	GK	THA	Thanaphat Promphat
3	DF	THA	Sumana Salapphet
7	MF	THA	Jiranat Sopaanan
8	FW	THA	Chawanwit Saelao
9	MF	THA	Tanabordee Thongsuk
11	FW	THA	Niphitphon Wongpanya
12	DF	THA	Yutthana Dasri
16	FW	THA	Kamin Kurakanok
24	DF	THA	Athicha Kathong

No.	Pos.	Nation	Player
27	MF	THA	Soravoot Chuncheed
28	FW	THA	Kanok Lertsomjit
36	MF	THA	Worawit Nuangsawak
39	FW	THA	Wachirawit Tupmuang
40	DF	THA	Saranyapong Niamson
41	MF	THA	Nathakrit Nuimad
42	DF	ZIM	Victor Kamhuka
44	MF	THA	Soraphat Kongun
47	FW	THA	Thanawat Kanyadee
49	GK	THA	Phijak Donwithai
56	DF	THA	Aekkaphong Phlmankasemsri
70	FW	BRA	Washington Brandão (on loan from Police Tero)
77	MF	THA	Chatchawal Pimmat
88	MF	THA	Nakarin Woochueku
99	GK	THA	Paradon Bunthanom

== Honours ==
=== Domestic leagues ===
- Thai League 3 Central Region
  - Winners: 2025–26
