= Anuchit Ngrnbukkol =

Thai footballer (born 1993)

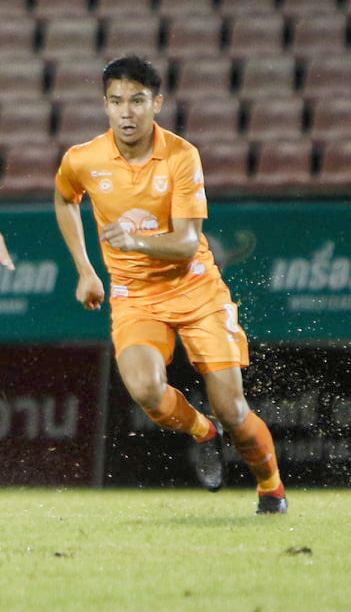
- Anuchit Ngrnbukkol playing for Sukhothai.

Personal information
- Full name: Anuchit Ngrnbukkol
- Date of birth: 23 June 1993 (age 33)
- Place of birth: Rayong, Thailand
- Position: Midfielder

Team information
- Current team: Songkhla
- Number: 30

Senior career*
| Years | Team | Apps | (Gls) |
| 2015–2016 | Sukhothai | 25 | (1) |
| 2018–2021 | Rayong | 42 | (3) |
| 2021–2025 | Sukhothai | 73 | (8) |
| 2025 | Chanthaburi | 9 | (0) |
| 2026– | Songkhla | 0 | (0) |
- * Club domestic league appearances and goals as of 1 April 2026

Anuchit Ngrnbukkol (Thai: อนุชิต เงินบุคคล; born 23 July 1993) is a Thai professional footballer who plays as a midfielder for Thai League 2 club Songkhla.
