= Kassiaty Gildas Labi =

Ivorian footballer (born 1984)

Personal information
- Full name: Kassiaty Gildas Aymard Labi
- Date of birth: May 6, 1984 (age 42)
- Place of birth: Abidjan, Côte d'Ivoire
- Height: 1.69 m (5 ft 6 1/2 in)
- Position: Midfielder

Youth career
- Africa Sports

Senior career*
Years	Team	Apps	(Gls)
2001–2006	Africa Sports		(42)
2007–2009	ASEC Mimosas		(13)
2009	Yangon United FC		(5)
2010	Delta United		(5)
2011	Chanthaburi		(11)
2012	Rayong United		(14)
2013–2014	Trat		(11)
2015	Krabi	28	(10)
- * Club domestic league appearances and goals

Kassiaty Gildas Aymard Labi (born May 6, 1984) is an Ivorian footballer.

== Career ==
Labi began his career in 2001 with Africa Sports as midfielder until 2006 and wore the club number 12. The former Africa Captain signed in 2007 for ASEC Mimosas as midfielder wearing club number 8. In January 2009, he left ASEC Mimosas before signing, in May 2009, for Yangon United FC. He played for striker wearing club number 19. In January 2010 he signed for Delta United as a midfielder wearing club number 8 he played in the Myanmar League for about a year and half. After getting a new contract he moved to Thailand and was signed to the first team for league Division 1 in 2011 with Chanthaburi F.C., as striker wearing club number 25. In 2012, he signed for a new team with Rayong United F.C., as striker in league Division 2. In January 2013, he moved to league Division 1 again and signed with Trat F.C. as midfielder wearing club number 23.
