= 2015 Regional League Division 2 Bangkok Metropolitan Region =

Regional League Bangkok Metropolitan Region
- Season: 2015
- Champions: Customs United
- Matches: 181
- Goals: 477 (2.64 per match)
- Biggest home win: Customs United 6–1 Rayong United (8 March 2015)
- Biggest away win: Kasem Bundit 0–6 North Bangkok (21 March 2015)
- Highest scoring: Rayong United 3–4 RSU (1 March 2015)

2015 Regional League Division 2 Bangkok Metropolitan Region is the 7th season of the League competition since its establishment in 2009. It is in the third tier of the Thai football league system.

== Changes from last season ==
=== Team changes ===
==== Promoted clubs ====
Thai Honda were promoted to the 2015 Thai Division 1 League.

==== Withdrawn clubs ====
Raj-Vithi and Samut Prakan United have withdrawn from the 2015 campaign.

=== Expansion clubs ===
BU Deffo, Dome and Army F.C. joined the newly expanded league setup.

=== Clubs serving bans ===
- Paknampho NSRU – 2015 campaign.

==== Returning clubs ====
Kasetsart University is returning to the league after a 1-year break.

== Stadium and locations ==
Locations of the 2015 Thai Division 2 League Bangkok & field Region teams
Football clubs in Bangkok Metropolitan Region

| Team | Location | Stadium | Capacity | Ref. |
|---|---|---|---|---|
| Army F.C. | Bangkok | Thai Army Sports Stadium | 20,000 | |
| Assumption United | Nonthaburi | SCG Stadium | 15,000 | |
| BCC Tero | Bangkok | PAT Stadium | 12,308 | |
| BU Deffo | Pathum Thani | Bangkok University Stadium (Rangsit) | 4,000 | |
| Chamchuri United | Bangkok | Chulalongkorn University Stadium | 20,000 | |
| Customs United | Samut Prakan | Lad Krabang 54 Stadium | 2,000 | |
| Dome FC | Pathum Thani | Thammasat Stadium | 20,000 | |
| Kasetsart University | Nakhon Pathom | Kasetsart University Kamphaeng Saen Campus Stadium | 4,000 | |
| Kasem Bundit University | Bangkok | Kasem Bundit University Stadium | 2,000 | |
| North Bangkok College | Pathum Thani | North Bangkok University Rangsit Campus Stadium | 1,000 | |
| Rangsit University | Pathum Thani | Rangsit University Stadium | 2,684 | |
| Pluak Daeng Rayong United | Rayong | Pattana Sport Club Stadium | ? | |
| RBAC | Bangkok | RBAC University Stadium | 1,000 | |
| Rangsit | Pathum Thani | Leo Stadium | 13,000 | |

== League table ==
| Pos | Team | Pld | W | D | L | GF | GA | GD | Pts | Qualification |
|---|---|---|---|---|---|---|---|---|---|---|
| 1 | Customs United (C, Q) | 26 | 16 | 5 | 5 | 46 | 25 | +21 | 53 | Champions League Round |
| 2 | Chamchuri United (Q) | 26 | 14 | 4 | 8 | 47 | 35 | +12 | 46 | Champions League Round |
| 3 | Assumption United | 26 | 12 | 6 | 8 | 39 | 30 | +9 | 42 | |
| 4 | Kasetsart University | 26 | 12 | 5 | 9 | 34 | 27 | +7 | 41 | |
| 5 | Kasem Bundit University | 26 | 12 | 4 | 10 | 41 | 40 | +1 | 40 | |
| 6 | Army F.C. | 26 | 11 | 6 | 9 | 31 | 25 | +6 | 39 | |
| 7 | Rangsit | 26 | 11 | 5 | 10 | 35 | 29 | +6 | 38 | |
| 8 | BCC Tero | 26 | 9 | 7 | 10 | 37 | 22 | +15 | 34 | |
| 9 | RSU | 26 | 8 | 8 | 10 | 27 | 31 | −4 | 32 (Note: RYU 3–4 RSU; RSU 4–4 RYU) | |
| 10 | Rayong United | 26 | 8 | 8 | 10 | 40 | 46 | −6 | 32 | |
| 11 | North Bangkok College | 26 | 6 | 10 | 10 | 26 | 31 | −5 | 28 | |
| 12 | BU.Deffo | 26 | 5 | 11 | 10 | 38 | 40 | −2 | 26 | |
| 13 | Ratchaburi Mitrphol RBAC | 26 | 6 | 4 | 16 | 26 | 58 | −32 | 22 | |
| 14 | Dome | 26 | 4 | 3 | 19 | 19 | 47 | −28 | 15 | |

Rules for classification: 1) points; 2) head-to-head points; 3) head-to-head goal difference; 4) head-to-head goals scored; 5) goal difference; 6) number of goals scored.
(C) Champions; (Q) Qualified for the phase indicated
Notes:
- BCC Tero deducted 15 points for fielding an ineligible player.

== See also ==
- 2015 Thai Premier League
- 2015 Thai Division 1 League
- 2015 Regional League Division 2
- 2015 Thai FA Cup
- 2015 Thai League Cup
- 2015 Kor Royal Cup
