= Sakon Nakhon Rajabhat University Stadium =

Coordinates: 17.190621°N 104.093056°E

- Interactive map of Sakon Nakhon Rajabhat University Stadium
- Location: Sakon Nakhon, Thailand
- Surface: Grass

Tenant
- Sakon Nakhon F.C.

Sakon Nakhon Rajabhat University Stadium (Thai: สนามมหาวิทยาลัยราชภัฎสกลนคร) is a multi-purpose stadium in Sakon Nakhon province, Thailand. It is currently used mostly for football matches and is the home stadium of Sakon Nakhon F.C.
