= Wutthipong Kerdkul =

Thai footballer

Personal information
- Full name: Wutthipong Kerdkul
- Date of birth: 14 March 1987 (age 39)
- Place of birth: Surat Thani, Thailand
- Height: 1.75 m (5 ft 9 in)
- Position: Striker

Youth career
- Surat Thani

Senior career*
Years	Team	Apps	(Gls)
2007–2008	Surat Thani	39	(11)
2009	RBAC	30	(27)
2010–2011	Bangkok Glass	0	(0)
2010	→ Bangkok United (loan)	16	(9)
2011	→ Hat Yai (loan)	18	(11)
2012	Osotspa Saraburi	5	(0)
2012	Hat Yai		
2013	Looktabfah		
2014	Pattani		
2016–	Trang		
- * Club domestic league appearances and goals as of 23 June 2008

Wutthipong Kerdkul (Thai: วุฒิพงษ์ เกิดกุล, born March 14, 1987) is a Thai former footballer. He was also the leading scorer of the Thai Division 1 League in season 2009 with 27 goals.
