= Police United F.C. =

Thai football club

Police United เพื่อนตำรวจ
- Full name: Police United Football Club สโมสรฟุตบอลเพื่อนตำรวจ
- Nicknames: The Cop; The Silver Shields (สุภาพบุรุษโล่เงิน)
- Founded: 1960; as Royal Thai Police Football Club
- Dissolved: 2017 (merged with BEC Tero Sasana)
- Ground: Boonyachinda Stadium; Bangkok, Thailand
- Capacity: 5,000
- Owner: Royal Thai Police
Home colours	Away colours

Police United Football club (Thai: สโมสรฟุตบอลเพื่อนตำรวจ) is a Thai defunct football club that was managed by the Royal Thai Police from 1960 to 2008. In 2017, the club merged with BEC Tero Sasana and changed the name to Police Tero at the beginning of season 2018.

== History ==
=== 1960–2009 ===
The club was founded as Police Sports Club in 1960. In 1965 the Association celebrated its first and only championship. After a period of inactivity, the club had recorded three relegations and 2 promotions in the last 10 years. They were promoted to the Thailand Premier League in 2006, followed in 2007 by a relegation. The following year, the club missed promotion by a margin of just 4 points of the season and finished in fourth place. Before the 2009 season, the club was renamed 'Royal Thai Police F.C.. This was due to the new requirements by the Thailand Premier League and the AFC, which provides that clubs act as companies and must also be registered as such.

=== 2009–2017 ===
The 2009 Thai Division 1 League was dominated from the outset by Police United. With 65 points from 30 games, the club gained their third promotion, to the Thai Premier League. The team scored a total of 76 goals. Manit Noywech, top striker of the club, reached 24 goals. After the end of the season the team had an awards reception. Chaiyong Khumpiam was named coach of the year, Sompong Yod-Ard as goalkeeper of the year and Manit Noywech striker of the year.

For the 2010 season, the policy could undertake two high-quality players. In midfield, they were reinforced with the experienced Narongchai Vachiraban and attacked with Nantawat Tansopa. The latter was the top scorer in the 2008 AFC Champions League. With Goran Zoric another striker was added. Zoric is the first Australian in the Thai Premier League.

In January 2010, the club signed a contract with the company Insee. For the amount of 60 million baht, over a period of three years, the club was nicknamed Insee Police Friends due to sponsorship agreements.

The official name of the club is Insee Police United. For the 2010 season, the stadium was changed again. The new home of the club is now the Thammasat Stadium in Pathum Thani Province north of Bangkok.

In 2011, the club signed Thawatchai Damrong-Ongtrakul, former coach of Pattaya United as a new coach.

In 2014, the club signed Anton Ferdinand, the brother of English Premier League Manchester United Defender Rio Ferdinand. He did not make an appearance for the club.

In 2017, The club was dissolved and merged with BEC Tero Sasana and became Police Tero Football Club.

== Stadium and locations by season records ==
Coordinates	Location	Stadium	Capacity	Year
13°31′55″N 99°48′50″E	Ratchaburi	Ratchaburi Stadium	10,000	2007
13°52′02″N 100°34′39″E	Bangkok	Boonyachinda Stadium	3,550	2008
13°46′40″N 100°38′41″E	Bang Kapi, Bangkok	Klong Chan Sports Center	?	2009
14°04′04″N 100°35′55″E	Pathumthani	Thammasat Stadium	25,000	2010–2014
13°52′02″N 100°34′39″E	Bangkok	Boonyachinda Stadium	3,550	2015

== Season by season record ==
Season	League									FA Cup	League Cup	Queen's Cup	Kor Royal Cup	ACL	AFC Cup	ASEAN Club	Top scorer	
Season	Division	P	W	D	L	F	A	Pts	Pos	FA Cup	League Cup	Queen's Cup	Kor Royal Cup	ACL	AFC Cup	ASEAN Club	Name	Goals
1996–97	TPL	34	13	11	10	53	39	50	10th	—N/a	–	—N/a	–	–	–	–	—N/a	—N/a
1997	TPL	22	4	10	8	19	25	22	11th	—N/a	–	—N/a	–	–	–	–	—N/a	—N/a
1998	DIV1	—N/a	—N/a	—N/a	—N/a	—N/a	—N/a	—N/a	—N/a	—N/a	–	–	–	–	–	–	—N/a	—N/a
1999	DIV1	—N/a	—N/a	—N/a	—N/a	—N/a	—N/a	—N/a	1st	—N/a	–	—N/a	–	–	–	–	Yordchay Dejleh	15
2000	TPL	22	6	8	8	25	27	26	7th	—N/a	–	—N/a	–	–	–	–	—N/a	—N/a
2001–02	TPL	22	4	7	11	16	24	19	11th	—N/a	–	—N/a	–	–	–	–	—N/a	—N/a
2002–03	DIV1	—N/a	—N/a	—N/a	—N/a	—N/a	—N/a	—N/a	—N/a	–	–	—N/a	–	–	–	–	—N/a	—N/a
2003–04	DIV1	—N/a	—N/a	—N/a	—N/a	—N/a	—N/a	—N/a	—N/a	–	–	—N/a	–	–	–	–	—N/a	—N/a
2004–05	DIV1	—N/a	—N/a	—N/a	—N/a	—N/a	—N/a	—N/a	—N/a	–	–	–	–	–	–	–	—N/a	—N/a
2006	DIV1	—N/a	—N/a	—N/a	—N/a	—N/a	—N/a	—N/a	1st	–	–	SF	–	–	–	–	—N/a	—N/a
2007	TPL	30	5	4	21	19	51	19	16th	–	–	–	–	–	–	–	Traore Adama	5
2008	DIV1	30	12	15	3	35	24	51	4th	–	–	–	–	–	–	–	Victot Paintsil	12
2009	DIV1	30	19	8	3	76	25	65	1st	R4	–	GR	–	–	–	–	Manit Noywech	24
2010	TPL	30	9	6	15	40	45	33	11th	R3	R2	QF	–	–	–	–	Chakrit Buathong	8+(3)^{(3 goals to Bec Tero)}
2011	TPL	34	11	11	12	36	40	44	9th	R5	SF	–	–	–	–	–	Surachat Sareepim	8
2012	TPL	34	10	12	12	37	38	42	11th	R4	R1	–	–	–	–	–	Leandro Dos Santos	9
2013	TPL	32	9	11	12	40	37	38	9th	SF	R3	–	–	–	–	–	Michaël Murcy	10
2014	TPL	38	11	10	17	58	64	43	16th	R3	R2	–	–	–	–	–	Michaël Murcy	10
2015	DIV1	38	24	8	6	84	30	80	1st	QF	SF	–	–	–	–	–	Tana Chanabut	25
2016	Banned																	

Champions	Runners-up	Third Place	Promoted	Relegated

- P = Played
- W = Games won
- D = Games drawn
- L = Games lost
- F = Goals for
- A = Goals against
- Pts = Points
- Pos = Final position
- Pos = Final position
- TPL = Thai Premier League
- QR1 = First Qualifying Round
- QR2 = Second Qualifying Round
- QR3 = Third Qualifying Round
- QR4 = Fourth Qualifying Round
- RInt = Intermediate Round
- R1 = Round 1
- R2 = Round 2
- R3 = Round 3
- R4 = Round 4
- R5 = Round 5
- R6 = Round 6
- GR = Group Stage
- QF = Quarter-finals
- SF = Semi-finals
- RU = Runners-up
- S = Shared
- W = Winners

=== Asian Club Championship ===
Team	GP	W	D	L	F	A	GD	PTS
Royal Thai Police	3	0	0	3	1	11	−10	0

==== Results ====
Season	Team 1	Score	Team 2
1970	(Thailand) Royal Thai Police	0–5	(Israel) Hapoel Tel Aviv
1970	(Thailand) Royal Thai Police	0–4	(Indonesia) PSMS Medan
1970	(Thailand) Royal Thai Police	1–2	(India) West Bengal

== Coaches ==
Coaches by Years (2006–present)

Name	Nat	Period	Honours
Chaiyong Khumpiam	(Thailand)	2006–2007	Champion 2006 Thai Division 1 League
Vithoon Kijmongkolsak	(Thailand)	2008	
Chaiyong Khumpiam	(Thailand)	2009–2010	Champion 2009 Thai Division 1 League
Thawatchai Damrong-Ongtrakul	(Thailand)	2011–2014	
Carlos Roberto	(Brazil)	2014	
Mika Lönnström	(Finland)	April 2014 – June 2014	
Thawatchai Damrong-Ongtrakul	(Thailand)	June 2014 – August 2014	
Attaphol Buspakom	(Thailand)	August 2014 – April 2015	
Totchtawan Sripan	(Thailand)	May 2015 – January 2016	Champion 2015 Thai Division 1 League

== Honours ==
- Thai Division 1 League
  - Winner: 1999, 2005, 2009, 2015
- Kor Royal Cup (Thai: ถ้วย ก.)
  - Winner: 1965
- Khǒr Royal Cup (Thai: ถ้วย ข.)
  - Winner: 1953–54
- League Cup (Thai: โตโยต้าคัพ)
  - Winner: 1989, 1991, 1993
