= Pluakdaeng United F.C. =

Association football club

Pluakdaeng United FC ปลวกแดง ยูไนเต็ด
- Full name: Pluakdaeng United Football Club สโมสรฟุตบอลปลวกแดง ยูไนเต็ด
- Nicknames: Elephant Warrior (นักรบช้างศึก)
- Founded: 2005 (as Prachinburi F.C.); 2012 (as Rayong United F.C.); 2014 (as Pluakdaeng Rayong United F.C.); 2019 (as Pluakdaeng United F.C.)
- Ground: C.K. Stadium; Rayong, Thailand
- Capacity: 1,000
- Chairman: Chaiyong Khupenwijittrakan
- Head Coach: Chayaphon Kotchasan
- League: Thai League 3
- 2025–26: Thai League 3, 8th of 12 in the Eastern region
- Website: pluak-daeng-united-fc.com
Home colours	Away colours

Pluakdaeng United Football Club (Thai สโมสรฟุตบอลปลวกแดง ยูไนเต็ด ) or formerly Prachinburi Football Club (Thai สโมสรฟุตบอลจังหวัดปราจีนบุรี ) is a Thailand professional football club based in Rayong Province after relocating from Prachinburi Province in 2012. The club is currently playing in the Thai League 3 Eastern region.

== History ==
The club was founded in 2005 but took their first steps on the Thai professional league setup in 2007 when they played in Division 2 which was at the time a league that was at step 3 and was a national league, unlike today's system of regional leagues at step 3. Prachinburi finished in third position in their debut season but missed out on promotion as only two clubs at the time were promoted.

In 2008, Prachniburi built on their debut season and won the 2008 Thailand Division 2 League (Group A) championship and the end of season playoff match against the Army Welfare team to be crowned overall champions and promotion to the 1st Division.

Afterward, the club finished 5th place in the 2009 Thai Division 1 League campaign, remaining clear of the relegation places, but not contending for promotion to the Thai Premier League.

But 2010 would see the lowest point in Prachinburi's history to date. The local authority entered a new club, Prachinburi United, into the Regional League more or less telling Prachinburi that they weren't welcome anymore. The off-field issues appeared to move on field as well and the club came in 13th, a position that would normally keep a team in the same division, but the Thai FA decided to introduce end-of-season playoffs to determine relegation and promotion between Division 1 and the Regional League as part of a league expansion shakeup.

In the playoff's, Prachinburi were drawn to play Rangsit University JW whom themselves had struggled in earlier playoff matches at Regional League level. Prachinburi duly lost 1:0 over two legs and were relegated.

With relegation confirmed, Prachinburi in theory should have joined the Regional League Central-East Division, but due to the football associations policy of one province per league, the club had to move into the Bangkok Area Division as Prachinburi United were already allocated the Central-East spot.

In early 2012 the club relocated to Rayong and would play at the Klaeng District Stadium. Thai web forums would also refer to the club as Prachinburi (Rayong United) FC, which would suggest that the club was preparing to play football in the province on a full-time basis. The move out of their home province seems to have been forced with the local government authority getting behind the Prachinburi United football club that was formed in 2010.

The relocation proved successful as they were promoted to Division 1 after finishing second in the Bangkok Regional league and then in the same place in the playoffs.

In 2021, the club used CK Stadium as its home ground. In addition, 2s Sport became its jersey sponsored.

In 2022, Pluakdaeng United competed in the Thai League 3 for the 2022–23 season. It is their 16th season in the professional league. The club started the season with a 1–2 home defeat to Pattaya Dolphins United and they ended the season with a 0–2 away defeat to Pattaya Dolphins United. The club has finished 7th place in the league of the Eastern region. In addition, in the 2022–23 Thai League Cup Pluakdaeng United was defeated 0–1 by Chiangmai United in the qualification play-off round, causing them to be eliminated.

== Honours ==
=== Domestic leagues ===
- Thai League 3 Eastern Region
  - Winners (1): 2020–21
- Thailand Division 2 League
  - Winners (1): 2008

== Stadium and locations ==
Coordinates	Location	Stadium	Year
14°03′53″N 101°22′30″E	Prachinburi	Prachinburi Province Stadium	2007–2010
14°01′45″N 101°31′52″E	Prachantakham, Prachinburi	Koh Loi Subdistrict Administrative Organization Stadium	2011
12°47′46″N 101°39′29″E	Klaeng, Rayong	Klaeng District Stadium	2012
12°40′49″N 101°14′08″E	Rayong	Rayong Province Stadium	2013
13°05′07″N 101°09′11″E	Rayong	Pattana Sport Club Stadium	2014–2015
12°40′49″N 101°14′08″E	Rayong	Rayong Province Stadium	2016–2017

== Season-by-season record ==
Season	League									FA Cup	League Cup	T3 Cup	Top goalscorer	
Season	Division	P	W	D	L	F	A	Pts	Pos	FA Cup	League Cup	T3 Cup	Name	Goals
2007	DIV2	22	12	7	3	41	22	43	3rd	Opted out				
2008	DIV2 A	20	12	5	3	39	18	41	1st	Opted out				
2009	DIV 1	30	13	5	12	34	30	44	5th	Opted out				
2010	DIV 1	30	10	5	15	29	36	35	13th	Opted out	Opted out			
2011	DIV2 Bangkok	30	13	10	7	44	30	49	4th	Opted out	Opted out			
2012	DIV2 Bangkok	34	19	10	5	54	29	67	2nd	Opted out	Opted out		(Ivory Coast) Kassiaty Gildas Laby	14
2013	DIV 1	34	6	9	19	37	57	27	18th	R2	Opted out		(Brazil) Valci Júnior	8
2014	DIV2 Bangkok	26	4	4	18	26	62	16	13th	Opted out	Opted out			
2015	DIV2 Bangkok	26	8	8	10	40	46	32	10th	Opted out	QR2			
2016	DIV2 Eastern	22	9	6	7	30	19	33	6th	R1	QR1			
2017	T4 East	27	12	10	5	36	23	46	3rd	R2	QR2		(Thailand) Pratya Narach	7
2018	T4 East	27	11	8	8	40	28	41	3rd	QR	QR2		(Thailand) Warut Trongkratok	8
2019	T4 East	28	8	8	12	35	39	32	5th	R2	QRP		(Thailand) Alongkorn Nuekmai	8
2020–21	T3 East	17	12	3	2	43	15	39	1st	R2	QR2		(Brazil) Alberto Moreira Gouvea	13
2021–22	T3 East	22	12	4	6	29	23	40	3rd	R1	R1		(Thailand) Warut Trongkratok	14
2022–23	T3 East	22	8	5	9	22	26	29	7th	Opted out	QRP		(Brazil) Thiago de Jesús dos Santos	7
2023–24	T3 East	20	9	7	4	36	20	34	3rd	Opted out	QR1	R1	(Thailand) Jakkarin Yaukyen	8
2024–25	T3 East	22	8	8	6	27	23	32	6th	Opted out	QR2	QF	(Thailand) Teerapong Malai	11
2025–26	T3 East	22	6	7	9	26	33	25	8th	Opted out	QR2	LP	(Thailand) Warut Trongkratok	6

Champions	Runners-up	Third place	Promoted	Relegated

- P = Played
- W = Games won
- D = Games drawn
- L = Games lost
- F = Goals for
- A = Goals against
- Pts = Points
- Pos = Final position
- TPL = Thai Premier League
- QR1 = First Qualifying Round
- QR2 = Second Qualifying Round
- QR3 = Third Qualifying Round
- QR4 = Fourth Qualifying Round
- RInt = Intermediate Round
- R1 = Round 1
- R2 = Round 2
- R3 = Round 3
- R4 = Round 4
- R5 = Round 5
- R6 = Round 6
- GR = Group stage
- QF = Quarter-finals
- SF = Semi-finals
- RU = Runners-up
- S = Shared
- W = Winners

== Players ==
=== Current squad ===
As of 20 September 2026

Note: Flags indicate national team as defined under FIFA eligibility rules; some limited exceptions apply. Players may hold more than one non-FIFA nationality.

No.	Pos.	Nation	Player
1	GK	THA	Nattan Plaidueng
2	DF	THA	Phongsakorn Phungkaew
4	DF	CAN	Nathan Walters-Harewood
5	DF	THA	Thammarat Waenmani
7	MF	THA	Jakkarin Yaukyen
8	MF	THA	Prin Prathummet
10	MF	KOR	Mun Te-su
11	FW	THA	Abdulkordiri Hamid
14	MF	THA	Sorawit Buacha
17	MF	THA	Amaradet Kittiphonpracha
18	MF	THA	Phongsiri Nada

No.	Pos.	Nation	Player
19	GK	THA	Theerachai Junjuea
20	MF	THA	Pipittanapong Buntom
21	MF	THA	Worachit Lanrob
25	FW	THA	Chinathip Phormthong
27	FW	THA	Muhamadasman Satoh
41	FW	THA	Warut Trongkratok
42	MF	THA	Suppasek Kaikaew
48	MF	THA	Peeraphat Takamfoo
54	MF	THA	Itthichet Meeprom
56	DF	THA	Jongrak Pakdee
63	GK	THA	Kittisak Foofung
66	MF	THA	Pisit Somjanthuek
88	FW	CAN	Kobe Liakat Dhanji
