= Sakon Nakhon F.C. =

Thai football club

Sakon Nakhon FC สกลนคร เอฟซี
- Full name: Sakon Nakhon Football Club สโมสรฟุตบอลจังหวัดสกลนคร
- Nickname: Singha Puphan
- Short name: SKONFC
- Founded: 2005; 20 years ago
- Ground: Sakon Nakhon City municipality Stadium; Sakon Nakhon, Thailand
- Capacity: 1,514
- Chairman: Chaimongkol Chairob
- Manager: Sakda Chayakrit
- League: Thailand Semi-pro League
- 2022–23: Thai League 3, 13th of 13 in the Northeastern region (relegated)
| Home colours | Away colours |

Sakon Nakhon Football Club (Thai สโมสรฟุตบอลจังหวัดสกลนคร), is a Thai semi professional football club based in Sakon Nakhon Province. The club currently plays in Thai League 3 Northeastern region.

== History ==
In 2022, Sakon Nakhon competed in the Thai League 3 for the 2022–23 season. It is their 17th season in the professional league. The club started the season with a 0–6 away defeat to Ubon Kruanapat and they ended the season with a 0–1 home defeat to Ubon Kruanapat. The club has finished 13th place in the league of the Northeastern region and relegated to the lower division in next season.

== Stadium and locations ==
| Coordinates | Location | Stadium | Year |
|---|---|---|---|
| 17°10′16″N 104°08′57″E | Sakon Nakhon | Sakolrajwittayanukul School | 2007–2009 |
| 17°08′46″N 104°09′25″E | Sakon Nakhon | Sakon Nakhon City municipality Stadium | 2010–2015 |
| 17°11′26″N 104°05′35″E | Sakon Nakhon | Sakon Nakhon Rajabhat University Stadium | 2016 |
| 17°12′05″N 104°06′21″E | Sakon Nakhon | Sakon Nakhon SAT Stadium (Sakon Nakhon Province Stadium) | 2017–present |

== Season by season record ==
| Season | League | | | | | | | | | FA Cup | League Cup | Top goalscorer | |
| Season | Division | P | W | D | L | F | A | Pts | Pos | FA Cup | League Cup | Name | Goals |
|---|---|---|---|---|---|---|---|---|---|---|---|---|---|
| 2005 | | | | | | | | | | | | | |
| 2006 | DIV1 | | | | | | | | 13th | | | | |
| 2007 | DIV1 | 22 | 4 | 12 | 6 | 20 | 32 | 24 | 10th | | | | |
| 2008 | DIV2 Group A | 20 | 1 | 6 | 13 | 15 | 43 | 9 | 11th | | | | |
| 2009 | DIV2 Northeast | 20 | 6 | 2 | 12 | 25 | 48 | 20 | 9th | | | | |
| 2010 | DIV2 Northeast | 30 | 11 | 5 | 14 | 39 | 56 | 38 | 8th | | | | |
| 2011 | DIV2 Northeast | 30 | 10 | 7 | 13 | 49 | 60 | 37 | 10th | | | | |
| 2012 | DIV2 Northeast | 30 | 5 | 5 | 20 | 31 | 67 | 20 | 14th | | QR2 | | |
| 2013 | DIV2 Northeast | 30 | 9 | 5 | 16 | 39 | 62 | 32 | 11th | | QR1 | | |
| 2014 | DIV2 Northeast | 26 | 3 | 6 | 17 | 20 | 52 | 15 | 13th | | QR1 | | |
| 2015 | DIV2 Northeast | 34 | 6 | 4 | 24 | 34 | 88 | 22 | 16th | Not Enter | | | |
| 2016 | DIV2 Northeast | 26 | 10 | 5 | 11 | 35 | 41 | 35 | 7th | Not Enter | QR1 | | |
| 2017 | T4 Northeast | 33 | 14 | 5 | 14 | 45 | 43 | 47 | 5th | Not Enter | Not Enter | (Thailand) Decha Sirifong | 12 |
| 2018 | T4 Northeast | 26 | 7 | 8 | 11 | 32 | 45 | 29 | 11th | Not Enter | QRP | (Thailand) Decha Sirifong | 8 |
| 2019 | T4 Northeast | 24 | 7 | 8 | 9 | 39 | 44 | 29 | 8th | Not Enter | Not Enter | (Thailand) Niyom Coomchompoo | 13 |
| 2020–21 | T3 Northeast | 16 | 2 | 6 | 8 | 15 | 25 | 12 | 10th | Not Enter | Not Enter | (Nigeria) Michael Wellington | 4 |
| 2021–22 | T3 Northeast | 24 | 8 | 8 | 8 | 38 | 35 | 32 | 8th | Not Enter | Not Enter | (Argentina) Nicolás Torres | 13 |
| 2022–23 | T3 Northeast | 24 | 0 | 6 | 18 | 18 | 60 | 6 | 13th | Not enter | Not enter | (Argentina) Nicolás Torres | 6 |

| Champions | Runners-up | Third place | Promoted | Relegated |

- P = Played
- W = Games won
- D = Games drawn
- L = Games lost
- F = Goals for
- A = Goals against
- Pts = Points
- Pos = Final position
- QR1 = First Qualifying Round
- QR2 = Second Qualifying Round
- R1 = Round 1
- R2 = Round 2
- R3 = Round 3
- R4 = Round 4
- R5 = Round 5
- R6 = Round 6
- QF = Quarter-finals
- SF = Semi-finals
- RU = Runners-up
- W = Winners

== Players ==
=== Current squad ===
As of 1 September 2022

Note: Flags indicate national team as defined under FIFA eligibility rules; some limited exceptions apply. Players may hold more than one non-FIFA nationality.

| No. | Pos. | Nation | Player |
|---|---|---|---|
| 1 | GK | THA | Pramot Chaiwinit |
| 2 | DF | THA | Thibat Prawanta |
| 5 | DF | THA | Saharath Auttiya |
| 6 | MF | THA | Worawut Butpha |
| 7 | MF | JPN | Shunsuke Furusho |
| 9 | FW | THA | Dacha Sirifong |
| 10 | DF | ARG | Torres Nicolás Emanuel |

| No. | Pos. | Nation | Player |
|---|---|---|---|
| 13 | FW | THA | Nattaphol Nguemphokwang |
| 14 | DF | THA | Sitichok Teecorngon |
| 16 | MF | THA | Santawee Seehawat |
| 21 | DF | THA | Wiwitchai U-kham |
| 23 | MF | ARG | Panigazzi Matias Ignacio |
| 26 | DF | THA | Kanok Kongsimma |
| 29 | GK | THA | Naphat Kongjandee |
| 39 | MF | THA | Surachet Wongsaprom |
| 66 | MF | THA | Voodthikai Thipsuwan |
