= Songkhla F.C. =

Thai football club

Songkhla สงขลา เอฟ.ซี.
- Full name: Songkhla Football Club (สโมสรฟุตบอลจังหวัดสงขลา)
- Nicknames: The Samila Mermaids (เงือกสมิหลา)
- Founded: 2018; 8 years ago
- Ground: Tinsulanonda Stadium; Songkhla, Thailand
- Capacity: 30,000
- Owner(s): Songkhla F.C. Co., Ltd.
- Chairman: Nicholas Siaw
- Manager: Phongsarun Inthusej
- Coach: Arnon Bandasak
- League: Thai League 2
- 2025–26: Thai League 2, 13th of 18
| Home colours | Away colours |

Songkhla Football Club (Thai สโมสรฟุตบอลจังหวัดสงขลา) is a Thai professional football club based in Songkhla Province, a province located in Southern Thailand.

They set to compete in Thai League 2 from 2025–26 season, the second tier of Thailand football after promotion from Thai League 3 in 2024–25 season.

== History ==
=== 1999–2011: Early history ===
Songkhla Football Club was established in 1999, and it then first played in the Thailand Provincial League, a former league, parallel to the Thai Premier League. In the founding year of the league, 1999, reached the eighth place in the league table.

| 1999–2007 | Provincial League | (Tier 3) |
| 2008 | Thailand Division 2 League | (Tier 3) |
| 2009–2012 | Thai Division 1 League | (Tier 2) |

In the years after it was found mostly back in the bottom of the table regions. In 2007, the club was runner-up of the Provincial League and played the following year in the Thailand Division 2 League. Surprisingly, it was the end of the season, again winning a second place and went on to the newly formed Thai Division 1 League.

In 2009 Thai Division 1 League, they finished a creditable 7th. They fared even better in 2010 Thai Division 1 League and just missed out on automatic promotion by 2 points. Their 4th-placed finished earned them a place in the Thai Premier League play-offs. Unfortunately the Bulls couldn't maintain their end off season form and finished bottom of their play-off group.

In this 2011 Thai Division 1 League, the team have an average attendance of around 18.000, with a peak of 23.000 people at Tinsulanonda Stadium during last matches. Highest attendance Songkhla 1–1 Buriram (36,715) (7 August 2011) . Their star and top striker with 17 scores is the Brazilian Chayene Santos.

=== Merging: Songkhla United and Songkhla ===
The club was dissolved and merged with Songkhla United in 2012.

=== 2018–present: A breath of hope ===
| 2018–2019 | Amateur League | (Tier 4) |
| 2020–2025 | Thai League 3 | (Tier 3) |
| 2025– | Thai League 2 | (Tier 2) |

Songkhla football club was come back and played in 2018 Thailand Amateur League Southern Region.

The Samila Mermaid won promotion from the fifth tier of the Thai football league system Thailand Amateur League Southern region in 2019 – beating Jantrangcee Saba Yoi City in the lower southern subregion final and beating Patong City in the southern region final. They qualified for the 2019 Thailand Amateur League championship stage as southern winner.

In 2022, Songkhla competed in the Thai League 3 for the 2022–23 season. It is their 3rd season in the professional league. The club started the season with a 2–0 home win over Wiang Sa Surat Thani City and they ended the season with a 0–0 away draw with Wiang Sa Surat Thani City. The club has finished 1st place in the league of the Southern region and advanced to the national championship stage. In addition, in the 2022–23 Thai FA Cup Songkhla was defeated 2–3 by Suphanburi in the second round, causing them to be eliminated and in the 2022–23 Thai League Cup Songkhla was defeated 1–2 by Lopburi City in the qualification play-off round, causing them to be eliminated too.

In 2024–25, Songkhla secure promotion to Thai League 2 for the first time in their history from next season after win aggregate 2–3 against North Bangkok University in Semi-final Promotion Play-off and runner-up of Thai League 3 after lost aggregate 1–5 against Rasisalai United.

== Crest ==
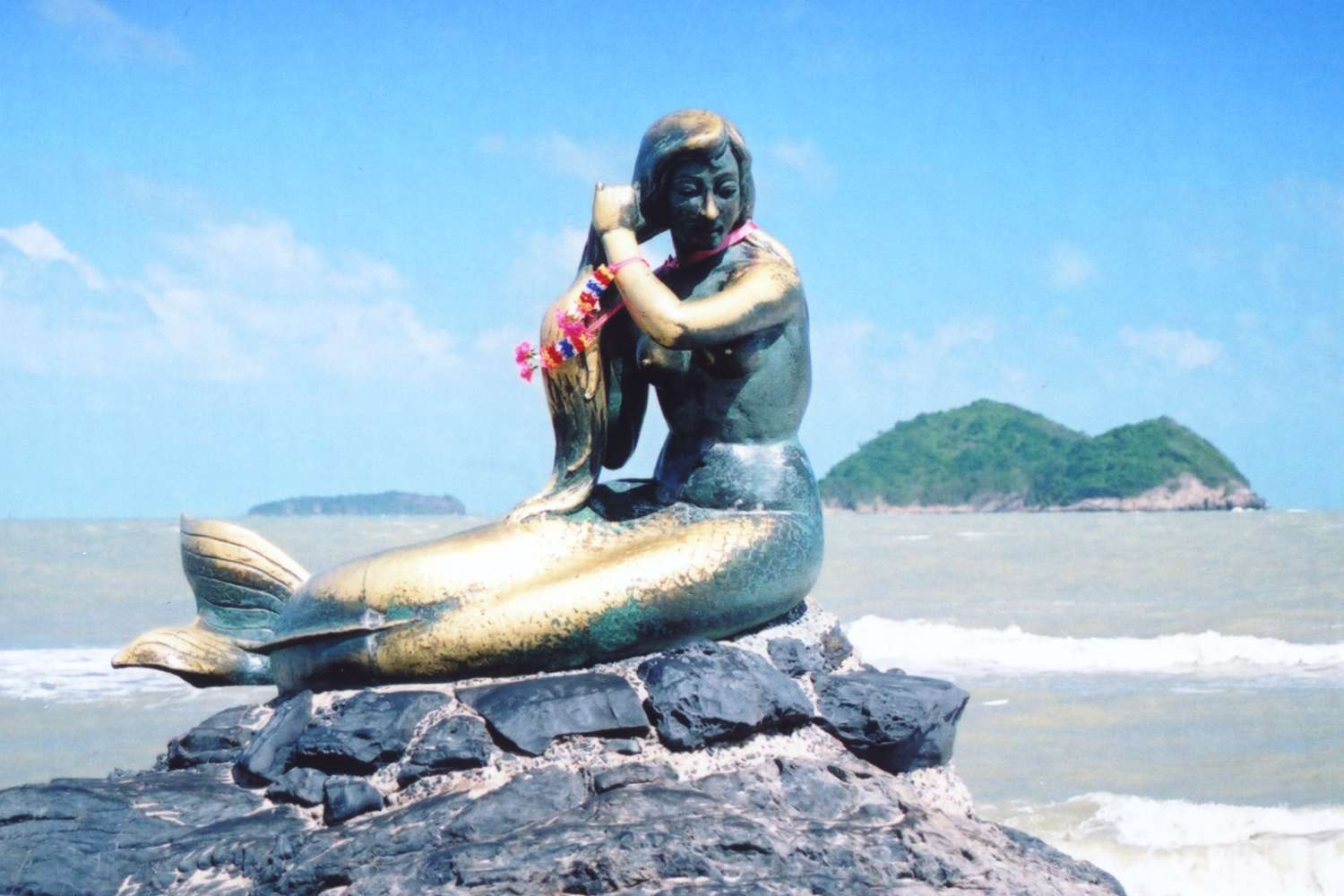
Mermaid statue at the Laem Samila beach serves as a symbol for the team

The club logo incorporates elements from the mermaid statue. Mermaid comes from the story Phra Aphai Mani by Sunthorn Phu.

== Stadium ==
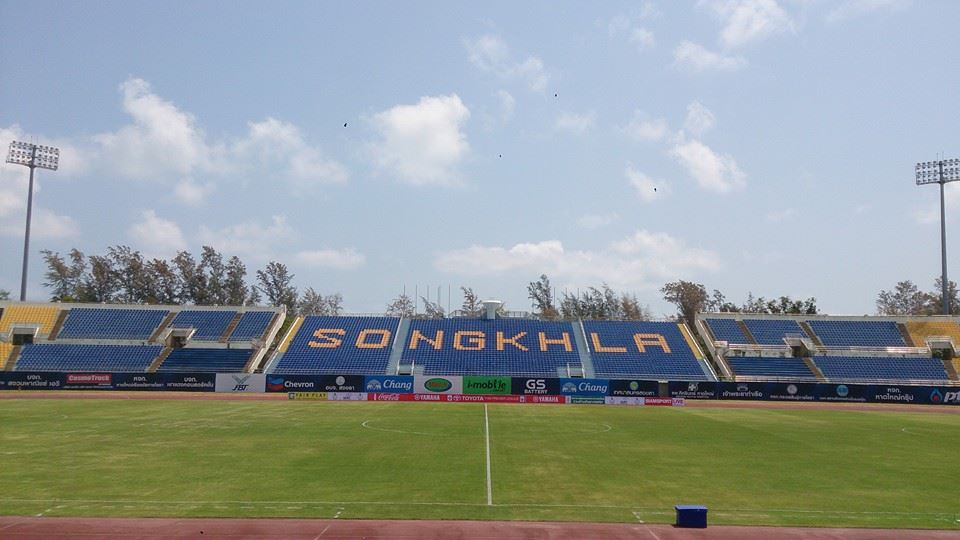
Tinsulanon Stadium

Tinsulanonda Stadium (Thai: สนามติณสูลานนท์, RTGS: Sanam Tinnasulanon) is a multi-purpose stadium in Songkhla, Thailand. Named after the Songkhla-born former Thai prime minister Prem Tinsulanonda, it is used mostly for football matches.

The stadium has a capacity of 45,000 but just 10,000 of those spaces are covered in a small single-tiered stand along one touchline. The rest of the stadium is a continuous curving tier. The stadium hosted one of the semi-finals in the 1998 Asian Games men's football tournament.

== Honours ==
Songkhla F.C. original

- Provincial League:
  - Runners-up (1): 2007
- Thai Division 2 League:
  - Runners-up (1): 2008

Songkhla F.C. new era

- Thai League 3 Southern Region:
  - Champions (4): 2020–21, 2022–23, 2023–24, 2024–25
- Thailand Amateur League:
  - Champions (1): 2019
- Thai League 3 Cup
  - Runners-up (1): 2024–25

== Stadium and locations ==
| Coordinates | Location | Stadium | Capacity | Year |
|---|---|---|---|---|
| 7°01′13″N 100°28′18″E | Hat Yai, Songkhla | Chira Nakhon Stadium | 25,000 | 2008–2010 |
| 6°44′00″N 100°41′31″E | Na Thawi, Songkhla | Na Thawi District Stadium | 3,000 | 2010 |
| 7°12′26″N 100°35′55″E | Songkhla | Tinsulanonda Stadium | 35,000 | 2011–2012 |
| 7°00′23″N 100°29′57″E | Hat Yai, Songkhla | Prince of Songkla University Stadium | 4,000 | 2018–2019 |
| 7°12′26″N 100°35′55″E | Songkhla | Tinsulanonda Stadium | 45,000 | 2020–present |

== Season by season record ==
| Season | League | | | | | | | | | FA Cup | League Cup | T3 Cup | Top scorer | |
| Season | Division | P | W | D | L | F | A | Pts | Pos | FA Cup | League Cup | T3 Cup | Name | Goals |
Songkhla F.C. - original
| 1999-00 | Pro League | 22 | 6 | 6 | 10 | 30 | 36 | 24 | 8th | | | | | |
| 2000-01 | Pro League | 22 | 4 | 5 | 13 | 25 | 54 | 17 | 12th | | | | | |
| 2002 | Pro League | 10 | 3 | 2 | 5 | 11 | 16 | 11 | 4th | | | | | |
| 2003 | Pro League | 22 | 3 | 6 | 13 | 26 | 54 | 15 | 11th | | | | | |
| 2004 | Pro League 2 | 4 | 1 | 1 | 2 | 4 | 8 | 4 | 4th | | | | | |
| 2005 | Suspended | | | | | | | | | | | | | |
| 2006 | Pro League 2 | 4 | 1 | 1 | 2 | 11 | 7 | 4 | 3rd | | | | | |
| 2007 | Pro League | 4 | 2 | 2 | 0 | 7 | 3 | 8 | 2nd | | | | | |
| 2008 | DIV2 | 20 | 11 | 4 | 5 | 27 | 17 | 37 | 2nd | | | | | |
| 2009 | DIV1 | 30 | 10 | 12 | 8 | 32 | 29 | 42 | 7th | R3 | | | (Thailand) Witthawat Iamram | 11 |
| 2010 | DIV1 | 30 | 14 | 9 | 7 | 47 | 34 | 51 | 4th | R2 | R1 | | (Thailand) Worawet Chanuthai | 12 |
| 2011 | DIV1 | 34 | 15 | 11 | 8 | 54 | 39 | 56 | 5th | SF | R1 | | (Brazil) Chayene Santos | 17 |
| 2012 | DIV1 | 34 | 9 | 10 | 15 | 38 | 51 | 37 | 14th | R4 | R2 | | | |
| 2013–2017 | Collapsed | | | | | | | | | | | | | |
Songkhla F.C. - new era
| 2018 | TA South | 2 | 0 | 1 | 1 | 3 | 4 | 1 | 3rd | | | | (Thailand) Chawalit Yuthong | 2 |
| 2019 | TA South | 5 | 4 | 0 | 1 | 15 | 5 | 12 | 1st | R1 | | | | |
| 2020–21 | T3 South | 16 | 12 | 1 | 3 | 29 | 16 | 37 | 1st | R3 | QR2 | | (Thailand) Abdussalam Saman | 12 |
| 2021–22 | T3 South | 24 | 14 | 6 | 4 | 40 | 18 | 48 | 3rd | QR | R2 | | (Brazil) Natan Oliveira | 17 |
| 2022–23 | T3 South | 22 | 16 | 5 | 1 | 46 | 10 | 53 | 1st | R2 | QRP | | (Brazil) Jardel | 20 |
| 2023–24 | T3 South | 22 | 17 | 5 | 0 | 46 | 7 | 56 | 1st | R3 | R2 | QF | (Nigeria) Ekene Victor Azike | 13 |
| 2024–25 | T3 South | 22 | 12 | 8 | 2 | 24 | 9 | 44 | 1st | Opted out | QR1 | RU | (Argentina) Ramiro Lizaso | 9 |
| 2025–26 | T2 | 34 | 11 | 8 | 15 | 37 | 46 | 41 | 13th | Opted out | QRP | – | | |

| Champions | Runners-up | Third Place | Promoted | Relegated |

- P = Played
- W = Games won
- D = Games drawn
- L = Games lost
- F = Goals for
- A = Goals against
- Pts = Points
- Pos = Final position
- DIV1 = Thai Division 1 League
- DIV2 = Thai Division 2 League
- Pro League = Provincial League
- TL = Thai League
- T1 = Thai League 1
- T2 = Thai League 2
- T3 = Thai League 3
- TA = Thailand Amateur League
- DQ = Disqualified
- PR = Preliminary Round
- QR1 = First Qualifying Round
- QR2 = Second Qualifying Round
- QR3 = Third Qualifying Round
- PO = Play-off
- R1 = Round 1
- R2 = Round 2
- R3 = Round 3
- R4 = Round 4
- R5 = Round 5
- R6 = Round 6
- GS = Group Stage
- KR = Knockout Round
- R16 = Round of 16
- QF = Quarter-finals
- SF = Semi-finals
- RU = Runners-up
- S = Shared
- W = Winners

== Players ==
=== Current squad ===
As of 1 June 2026

Note: Flags indicate national team as defined under FIFA eligibility rules; some limited exceptions apply. Players may hold more than one non-FIFA nationality.

| No. | Pos. | Nation | Player |
|---|---|---|---|
| 2 | DF | THA | Muhammadburhan Awae |
| 4 | DF | THA | Sitthichai Chimrueang |
| 5 | DF | THA | Abdulhafis Nibu (captain) |
| 6 | MF | THA | Nobparut Raksachum |
| 7 | FW | MTQ | Steeven Langil |
| 10 | FW | PHI | Chima Uzoka |
| 11 | FW | BRA | Mosquito |
| 15 | DF | THA | Abdulhafiz Bueraheng |
| 16 | MF | THA | Thirapong Yangdi |
| 18 | MF | THA | Rattasart Makasoot |
| 19 | FW | THA | Basree Sanron |
| 21 | MF | THA | Nassaron Heebenmad |
| 22 | FW | THA | Rungrot Madlah |

| No. | Pos. | Nation | Player |
|---|---|---|---|
| 23 | MF | THA | Phanitan Rakboon |
| 24 | MF | THA | Pardsakorn Sripudpong |
| 27 | DF | BRA | Alex Flávio |
| 28 | MF | THA | Amnuai Nueaoon |
| 30 | MF | THA | Anuchit Ngrnbukkol |
| 32 | FW | THA | Phukhachen Chandaeng |
| 45 | MF | THA | Bisrun Semuso |
| 46 | GK | THA | Sorawat Phosaman |
| 50 | GK | THA | Jedtarin Bunchod |
| 66 | FW | THA | Sanan Samala |
| 73 | FW | THA | Lennard Wurster |
| 99 | GK | THA | Fasin Silased |

== Club staff ==
| Position | Staff |
|---|---|
| Head coach | (Thailand) Arnon Bandasak |
| Assistant coach | (Thailand) Pattharaphon Molito (Thailand) Weerawat Chumwong |
| Goalkeeping coach | (Thailand) Thamrong Rangsi |
| Fitness coach | (Thailand) Wanarit Thiph-osot (Thailand) Anat Nureuang |
