= 2007 Thailand League Division 1 =

Thailand Division 1 League
- Season: 2007
- Champions: Customs Department
- Promoted: Coke-Bangpra; Chula-Sinthana; Samut Songkhram; Customs Department
- Relegated: Narathiwat; Air Force Training College; Sakon Nakhon; Bangkok Bravo; Ratchaburi; Bangkok North Central Association; Nakhon Ratchasima; Sisaket; Cha Choeng Sao; Royal Thai Marine College

The 2007 Thailand League Division 1 was played in two groups of 12 teams. The top two teams of each group were promoted and the bottom five teams of each group were relegated as the Thai football league system was in the process of being restructured.

Customs Department were crowned champions after winning the end of season championship finals played between the promoted sides.

== Member clubs in Group A ==
- Customs Depart
- Coke-Bangpra
- Rattana Bundit
- Khonkaen (move from 2006 Pro League 1 11th)
- Raj-Vithi
- Surat Thani (move from 2006 Pro League 1 7th)
- Thai Airways (from 2005–06 Khǒr Royal Cup (ถ้วย ข.) Runner-up)
- Narathiwat (move from 2006 Pro League 1 5th)
- Air Force Training College
- Sakon Nakhon (move from 2006 Pro League 1 13th)
- Bangkok Bravo (move from 2006 Pro League 1 9th)
- Ratchaburi (Promoted from 2006 Pro League 2 Champion)

== Member clubs in Group B ==
- Chula-Sinthana (Promoted from 2006 Thailand Division 2 League Champion)
- Samut Songkhram(Promoted from 2006 Pro League 2 Runner-up)
- Royal Thai Air Force
- Chanthaburi (move from 2006 Pro League 1 8th)
- Phitsanulok (move from 2006 Pro League 1 6th)
- Sriracha
- Nakhon Sawan (move from 2006 Pro League 1 4th)
- Bangkok North Central ASSN
- Nakhon Ratchasima (move from 2006 Pro League 1 10th)
- Sisaket (move from 2006 Pro League 1 12th)
- Chachoengsao (move from 2006 Pro League 1 14th)
- Royal Thai Marine (from 2005–06 Khǒr Royal Cup (ถ้วย ข.) Champion)

== Teams ==
Locations of the 2007 Thailand League Division 1 teams
2007 Thailand League Division 1 (Group A)
2007 Thailand League Division 1 (Group B)
Football clubs in Bangkok Metropolitan Region

=== Group A ===
| Team | Location | Stadium | Capacity |
|---|---|---|---|
| Air Force Training College | Pathum Thani | Thupatemee Stadium | 25,000 |
| Bangkok Bravo | Min Buri, Bangkok | 72nd Anniversary Stadium (Min Buri) | 10,000 |
| Customs Depart | Min Buri, Bangkok | Kasem Bundit University Stadium (Rom Klao) | 2,000 |
| Coke-Bangpra | Chonburi | Coke-Jamlong Smuewong Stadium | ? |
| Khonkaen | Khonkaen | Khon Kaen Province Stadium | ? |
| Narathiwat | Narathiwat | Narathiwat Municipal Stadium | ? |
| Raj-Vithi | Nong Chok, Bangkok | BEC Tero Sasana Nong Chok Stadium | 5,000 |
| Rattana Bundit | Bang Kapi, Bangkok | RBAC University Stadium | 1,000 |
| Ratchaburi | Ratchaburi | Ratchaburi Province Stadium | 10,000 |
| Sakon Nakhon | Sakon Nakhon | Sakolrajwittayanukul School | ? |
| Surat Thani | Surat Thani | Surat Thani Province Stadium | 10,000 |
| Thai Airways | Lat Krabang, Bangkok | King Mongkut's Institute of Technology Ladkrabang Stadium | ? |

=== Group B ===
| Team | Location | Stadium | Capacity |
|---|---|---|---|
| Bangkok North Central ASSN | Bang Kapi, Bangkok | Klong Chan Sports Center | ? |
| Chachoengsao | Chachoengsao | Chachoengsao PAO. Stadium | 10,000 |
| Chula-Sinthana | Bangkok | Chulalongkorn University Sports Stadium | 15,000 |
| Chanthaburi | Chanthaburi | Chanthaburi Province Stadium | 5,000 |
| Nakhon Sawan | Nakhon Sawan | Nakhon Sawan Province Stadium | ? |
| Nakhon Ratchasima | Nakhon Ratchasima | Pak Chong Municipal Stadium | ? |
| Phitsanulok | Phitsanulok | Pibulsongkram Rajabhat Stadium | ? |
| Royal Thai Marine | Sattahip, Chonburi | Sattahip Navy Stadium | 12,500 |
| Royal Thai Air Force | Pathum Thani | Thupatemee Stadium | 25,000 |
| Samut Songkhram | Samut Songkhram | Samut Songkhram Province Stadium | 5,000 |
| Sriracha | Chonburi | Princess Sirindhorn Stadium (Assumption College Sriracha Stadium) | ? |
| Sisaket | Sisaket | Sisaket Province Stadium | 10,000 |

== Final league standings ==
=== Group A ===
| Pos | Team | Pld | W | D | L | GF | GA | GD | Pts |
|---|---|---|---|---|---|---|---|---|---|
| 1 | Customs Depart | 22 | 12 | 9 | 1 | 33 | 16 | +17 | 45 |
| 2 | Coke-Bangpra | 22 | 11 | 8 | 3 | 30 | 14 | +16 | 41 |
| 3 | Rattana Bundit | 22 | 8 | 7 | 7 | 37 | 27 | +10 | 31 |
| 4 | Khonkaen | 22 | 7 | 8 | 7 | 25 | 25 | 0 | 29 |
| 5 | Raj-Vithi | 22 | 7 | 8 | 7 | 31 | 34 | −3 | 29 |
| 6 | Surat Thani | 22 | 7 | 7 | 8 | 31 | 42 | −11 | 28 |
| 7 | Thai Airways | 22 | 6 | 10 | 6 | 19 | 21 | −2 | 28 |
| 8 | Narathiwat | 22 | 7 | 6 | 9 | 31 | 28 | +3 | 27 |
| 9 | Air Force Training College | 22 | 6 | 7 | 9 | 32 | 33 | −1 | 25 |
| 10 | Sakon Nakhon | 22 | 4 | 12 | 6 | 20 | 32 | −12 | 24 |
| 11 | Bangkok Bravo | 22 | 5 | 8 | 9 | 27 | 35 | −8 | 23 |
| 12 | Ratchaburi | 22 | 5 | 4 | 13 | 31 | 40 | −9 | 19 |

=== Group B ===
| Pos | Team | Pld | W | D | L | GF | GA | GD | Pts |
|---|---|---|---|---|---|---|---|---|---|
| 1 | Chula-Sinthana | 22 | 14 | 4 | 4 | 45 | 21 | +24 | 46 |
| 2 | Samut Songkhram | 22 | 13 | 5 | 4 | 37 | 22 | +15 | 44 |
| 3 | Royal Thai Air Force | 22 | 12 | 6 | 4 | 41 | 2 | +39 | 42 |
| 4 | Chanthaburi | 22 | 8 | 7 | 7 | 37 | 27 | +10 | 31 |
| 5 | Phitsanulok | 22 | 7 | 8 | 7 | 29 | 26 | +3 | 29 |
| 6 | Sriracha | 22 | 7 | 8 | 7 | 20 | 20 | 0 | 29 |
| 7 | Nakhon Sawan | 22 | 6 | 11 | 5 | 26 | 30 | −4 | 29 |
| 8 | Bangkok North Central ASSN | 22 | 9 | 2 | 11 | 30 | 35 | −5 | 29 |
| 9 | Nakhon Ratchasima | 22 | 7 | 7 | 8 | 27 | 25 | +2 | 28 |
| 10 | Sisaket | 22 | 7 | 6 | 9 | 36 | 38 | −2 | 27 |
| 11 | Chachoengsao | 22 | 4 | 7 | 11 | 18 | 40 | −22 | 19 |
| 12 | Royal Thai Marine | 15 | 1 | 3 | 11 | 16 | 56 | −40 | 6 |

== Playoffs ==
=== Third place match ===
First Leg

| Coke-Bangpra | 3–1 | Samut Songkhram |

Second Leg

| Samut Songkhram | 0–1 | Coke-Bangpra |

Coke-Bangpra won 4–1 on aggregate.

=== Final ===
First Leg

| Customs Department | 4–2 | Chula-Sinthana |

Second Leg

| Chula-Sinthana | 4–2 1 – 4 p | Customs Department |

Customs Department won 1 – 4 on Penalties after Two Leg Draw 6–6 on aggregate.

== See also ==
- 2007 Thailand Premier League
- 2007 Thailand League Division 2
