= Provincial League =

Football league in Thailand from 1999 to 2008

- Sport: Football
- Founded: 1999
- Folded: 2008
- Organising body: Sports Authority of Thailand
- No. of teams: Vary
- Country: Thailand
- Last champion: Samut Prakan

Provincial League (formerly known as Professional League) also known as Pro League was the old regional Football league in Thailand in 1999–2008. It was founded in 1999 under the name "Provincial League" organized by Sports Authority of Thailand (SAT) and Ministry of Tourism and Sports. The name was changed to "Professional League" in 2004 and then changed back to "Provincial League" in 2007.

Before combining with Thailand Division 2 League in 2009, The Pro League was contested by clubs from provinces of Thailand divided into 5 regions. During 1999–2004, Provincial League was competed parallel with Thai Premier League (also see Thai football league system). The winners and runners-up from each regions will play in playoff matches in the tournament at the end of a season. The top two teams are promoted to Thailand Division 2 League.

== History ==
Provincial League was founded in 1999. The idea of Pro League came from two reasons: introducing the full professional football players and supporting the regional football clubs. Before the Pro League, many clubs in the Thai Premier League, another top national league, came from the government authorities, the military, and amateur clubs from big private companies. All of those clubs also located in Bangkok and regional clubs are not supported by the government. Then the Sports Authority of Thailand proposed a new league which includes teams from different provinces.

During 1999–2006, Pro League had two divisions, Pro League 1 and Pro League 2. Pro League 1 played in home-away format. The last two teams in the table are relegated into Pro League 2. The rest of the teams playing in Pro League 2 divided into 5 geographical regions. The winners and runners-up from each regions will play in the tournament format at the end of the season. The winner and runner-up of the tournament are promoted into Pro League 1.

In 2007, Pro League 1 was merged into Thai Premier League and Thailand Division 1 League. Then Pro League 2 changed the name to "Provincial League" again playing in the same format. The end-season tournament got the name of SAT Championship. The top two team are promoted into Thailand Division 2 League 2008.

In 2009, Provincial League was combined to 2009 Regional League Division 2 completely by the Football Association of Thailand.

== Championship History ==
#	Season	Winner	Runner up	Third place
1	1999-00	Sisaket	Suphanburi	Satun
2	2001	Nakhon Sawan	Suphanburi	Chonburi
3	2002	Suphanburi	Chonburi	Nakhon Sawan
4	2003	Nakhon Sawan	Suphanburi	Chonburi
5	2004	Suphanburi	Nakhon Sawan	Nakhon Pathom
6	2005	Chonburi	Suphanburi	Nakhon Pathom
7	2006	TOT	Port Authority 2	Nakhon Pathom
8	2007	Lopburi	Songkhla	Buriram; Krabi
9	2008	Samut Prakan United	Chaiyaphum	Angthong; Krabi

* The teams in bold typeface are promoted to Thailand Division 2 League.

== See also ==
- Thailand Football Records and Statistics
