= Bangkok Christian College F.C. =

Thai football club

BCC FC กรุงเทพคริสเตียน เอฟซี
- Full name: Bangkok Christian College Football Club สโมสรฟุตบอลกรุงเทพคริสเตียน
- Nicknames: Purple Cauldron (ชงโคสีม่วง)
- Founded: 1997
- Ground: Bangkok Christian College Field; Bangkok, Thailand
- Capacity: 5,000
- Owner: Bangkok Christian College
Home colours	Away colours

Bangkok Christian College Football Club (Thai: สโมสรฟุตบอลกรุงเทพคริสเตียน) is a Thai high school football club based in Bangkok. The name is derived from the school Bangkok Christian College.

In 2018, the club was suspended from professional football because it failed to pass its licensing process to play in the 2018 Thai League 4 Bangkok Metropolitan Region. The team was banned for 2 years and relegated to the 2020 Thailand Amateur League Bangkok Metropolitan Region. After that this club was appeal FA Thailand and pass to join 2018 Thailand Amateur League Bangkok Metropolitan Region.

The club continues to play under the name of Bangkok Christian College for high school football tournaments, such as the Jaturamitr Samakkee tournament and the Dailynews Cup, the latter of which the club became champions in the U18 tournament of 2026.

== Stadium and locations ==
Coordinates	Location	Stadium	Capacity	Year
13°45′01″N 100°34′01″E	Huai Khwang, Bangkok	Jarun Burapharat Stadium	?	2007–2008
13°45′16″N 100°36′59″E	Bang Kapi, Bangkok	Ramkhamhaeng University Stadium	6,000	2009
13°44′44″N 100°31′39″E	Pathum Wan, Bangkok	Thephasadin Stadium	6,378	2010–2012
13°42′54″N 100°33′35″E	Bangkok	PAT Stadium	12,308	2013
13°44′44″N 100°31′39″E	Pathum Wan, Bangkok	Thephasadin Stadium	6,378	2014
13°42′54″N 100°33′35″E	Bangkok	PAT Stadium	12,308	2015–2016
13°55′05″N 100°32′51″E	Lak Si, Bangkok	TOT Stadium Chaeng Watthana	5,000	2017
13°43′17″N 100°31′21″E	Bangkok	Bangkok Christian College Field	5,000	2018–2019

== Season by season record ==
Season	League									FA Cup	League Cup	Top goalscorer	
Season	Division	P	W	D	L	F	A	Pts	Pos	FA Cup	League Cup	Name	Goals
1997	Ngor Royal Cup	7	7			15	7	21	1st				
1998	Khor Royal Cup	7	7			10	3	21	1st				
1999	Khǒr Royal Cup	7	6			17	3	18	1st				
2000/2001	DIV1	20							2nd				
2001/2002	DIV1	20	14	3	3	44	14	45	1st				
2002/2003	TPL	18	2	3	13	16	44	9	10th				
2003/2004	DIV1	22							11th				
2005	Khǒr Royal Cup												
2006	DIV2	20	6	8	6	24	29	26	6th				
2007	DIV2	22	12	4	6	39	28	40	4th				
2008	DIV2 Group B	20	8	7	5	31	22	31	3rd				
2009	DIV2 Bangkok	18	7	3	8	27	25	24	5th				
2010	DIV2 Bangkok	24	11	8	5	34	20	41	6th				
2011	DIV2 Bangkok	30	10	11	9	41	34	41	9th				
2012	DIV2 Bangkok	34	5	13	16	28	53	28	16th				
2013	DIV2 Bangkok	26	14	4	8	35	27	46	3rd				
2014	DIV2 Bangkok	26	15	8	3	35	16	53	2nd				
2015	DIV2 Bangkok	26	9	7	10	37	22	34	8th	R1	QR1		
2016	DIV2 Bangkok	20	6	4	10	18	34	22	8th	R1	QR2		
2017	T4 Bangkok	30	12	9	9	49	37	45	4th	QR	QR2	Platel Remi	12
2018	TA Bangkok	2	0	2	0	2	2	2		Not Enter	Not Enter		
2019	TA Bangkok	5	1	1	3	5	12	4		Not Enter	Not Enter		

Champions	Runners-up	Promoted	Relegated

- P = Played
- W = Games won
- D = Games drawn
- L = Games lost
- F = Goals for
- A = Goals against
- Pts = Points
- Pos = Final position
- QR1 = First Qualifying Round
- QR2 = Second Qualifying Round
- R1 = Round 1
- R2 = Round 2
- R3 = Round 3
- R4 = Round 4
- R5 = Round 5
- R6 = Round 6
- QF = Quarter-finals
- SF = Semi-finals
- RU = Runners-up
- W = Winners

== Achievements ==
- Thailand Division 1 League: Winner 2001, Runners-up 2000
