= Air Force Welfare Department F.C. =

Thai football club

Air Force Welfare Department F.C. กรมสวัสดิการทหารอากาศ
- Full name: Thai Air Force Welfare Department Football Club สโมสรฟุตบอลกรมสวัสดิการทหารอากาศ
- Founded: 2011
- Ground: Thai Army Sports Stadium; Pathum Thani, Thailand
- Capacity: 20,000
- Chairman: Maj.Gen. Bunnawat Phakomon
- Head Coach: Lt.Col. Kwan Rattanarangsi
- League: 2018 Thailand Amateur League Bangkok Metropolitan Region

Thai Air Force Welfare Department Football Club (Thai สโมสรฟุตบอลกรมสวัสดิการทหารอากาศ), is a Thai professional football based in Pathum Thani Province. The club was founded in the name Air Force Welfare Department Football Club. They play in Regional League Division 2 Bangkok region from Promoted of Khǒr Cup.

In 2015 season they changed the club name to Royal Thai Army and changed logo after they promoted to division 2. This football club is Reserve team of Army United F.C.

In 2017 season The club is currently come back to play in the 2017 Thai League Amateur Tournament Bangkok Metropolitan Region.

In 2018 season The club play Thai FA Cup first time.

== Stadium and locations by season records ==
| Coordinates | Location | Stadium | Capacity | Year |
|---|---|---|---|---|
| 13°46′58″N 100°33′22″E | Bangkok | Thai Army Sports Stadium | 15,000 | (2007) 2015– |

== Season By Season record ==
| Season | League | | | | | | | | | FA Cup | League Cup | Top goalscorer | |
| Season | Division | P | W | D | L | F | A | Pts | Pos | FA Cup | League Cup | Name | Goals |
|---|---|---|---|---|---|---|---|---|---|---|---|---|---|
| 2015 | Bangkok | | | | | | | | | | | | |
| 2017 | T5 Bangkok | 6 | 4 | 1 | 1 | 18 | 7 | 13 | 5th – 6th | Not Enter | Can't Enter | | |
| 2018 | T5 Bangkok | | | | | | | | | R1 | Can't Enter | | |

| Champions | Runners-up | Promoted | Relegated |

- P = Played
- W = Games won
- D = Games drawn
- L = Games lost
- F = Goals for
- A = Goals against
- Pts = Points
- Pos = Final position
- QR1 = First Qualifying Round
- QR2 = Second Qualifying Round
- R1 = Round 1
- R2 = Round 2
- R3 = Round 3
- R4 = Round 4
- R5 = Round 5
- R6 = Round 6
- QF = Quarter-finals
- SF = Semi-finals
- RU = Runners-up
- W = Winners

== Honours ==
- Regional League Division 2
  - Runners-up : 2008
- Khǒr Royal Cup (ถ้วย ข.)
  - Champion : 2014
