= Thai League 2 =

National football league

- Organising body: Thai League Co., Ltd.
- Founded: 1997; 29 years ago
- Country: Thailand
- Confederation: AFC
- Number of clubs: 18
- Level on pyramid: 2
- Promotion to: Thai League 1
- Relegation to: Thai League 3
- Domestic cup: Thai FA Cup
- League cup: Thai League Cup
- Current champions: Rasisalai United (1st title) (2025–26)
- Most championships: Police United (4 titles)
- Website: thaileague.co.th/t2
- Current: 2026–27 Thai League 2

Thai League 2 (Thai: ไทยลีก 2), commonly known as the T2, formally called Thai Division 1 League, is the second-tier professional league in the Thai football league system. Seasons typically run from August to May, with each team playing 34 games : two against each other team, one home and one away. It is sponsored by BYD Auto and therefore officially known as the BYD Seal 5 League II. Champion, runner up and teams ranked 3rd – 6th qualified in play off for last spot in top tier promoted to Thai League 1 at the end of the season, whilst three are relegated to Thai League 3.

== History ==
For the 2008 season, the Football Association of Thailand (FAT) reduced the number of teams in the league to 16 teams. Previously there were two groups of 12 clubs. For the 2011 season the number of teams was increased to 18 teams, the Thai Division 1 League is a season run from March to October, with teams playing 34 games each totalling 306 games in the season. In 2016, the Khǒr Royal Cup became a trophy for Thai Division 1 League. In 2017 the Football Association of Thailand changed the name to Thai League 2.

== Promotion and relegation ==
Champion and runner up will be directly promoted to the Thai League 1, teams ranked 3rd – 6th qualified in play off for last spot in top tier next season.

The bottom three teams will be relegated to the Thai League 3.

== Stadiums and locations (2026–27) ==
Locations of the 2026–27 Thai League 2 teams
Football clubs in Bangkok Metropolitan Region

Team	Location	Stadium	Capacity
Chainat Hornbill	Chainat	Khao Plong Stadium	8,625
Chanthaburi	Chanthaburi	Chanthaburi Provincial Stadium	5,000
Chiangmai United	Chiang Mai	Chiang Mai Rajabhat University Mae Rim Campus Stadium	10,000
Kanchanaburi Power	Kanchanaburi	Kleeb Bua Stadium	13,000
Kasetsart	Bangkok (Chatuchak)	Insee Chantarasatit Stadium	3,275
Khonkaen United	Khon Kaen	Khonkaen PAO. Stadium	7,000
Mahasarakham	Mahasarakham	Mahasarakham Province Stadium	3,500
Muang Loei United	Loei	Loei Rjabhat University Stadium	7,000
Muangthong United	Nonthaburi (Pak Kret)	Thunderdome	13,000
Nakhon Pathom United	Nakhon Pathom	Nakhon Pathom Municipality Sport School Stadium	6,000
Nakhon Ratchasima	Nakhon Ratchasima	80th Birthday	25,000
Nongbua Pitchaya	Nongbua Lamphu	Pitchaya Stadium	6,000
Pattaya United	Chonburi (Bang Lamung)	Nong Prue Stadium	5,838
Phrae United	Phrae	Huai Ma Stadium	3,000
Police Tero	Bangkok (Lak Si)	NT Stadium	5,000
PT Satun	Satun	Satun PAO. Stadium	5,000
Songkhla	Songkhla	Tinsulanon Stadium	30,000
Uttaradit	Uttaradit	Uttaradit Provincial Stadium	3,245

=== Stadiums (2026–27) ===
Primary venues used in the Thai League 2:

Chainat Hornbill	Chanthaburi	Chiangmai United	Kanchanaburi Power	Kasetsart	Khon Kaen United
Khao Plong Stadium	Chanthaburi Province Stadium	Chiang Mai Rajabhat University Mae Rim Campus Stadium	Kleeb Bua Stadium	Insee Chantarasatit Stadium	Khonkaen PAO. Stadium
Capacity: 8,625	Capacity: 5,000	Capacity: 10,000	Capacity: 13,000	Capacity: 3,275	Capacity: 7,000
Mahasarakham	Muang Loei United	Muangthong United	Nakhon Pathom United	Nakhon Ratchasima	Nongbua Pitchaya
Mahasarakham Province Stadium	Loei Rjabhat University Stadium	Thunderdome Stadium	Nakhon Pathom School Stadium	Nakhon Si Thammarat Province Stadium	Pitchaya Stadium
Capacity: 5,500	Capacity: 7,000	Capacity: 13,000	Capacity: 6,000	Capacity: 25,000	Capacity: 6,000
Pattaya United	Phrae United	Police Tero	PT Satun	Songkhla	Uttaradit
Nong Prue Stadium	Huai Ma Stadium	NT Stadium	Satun PAO. Stadium	Tinsulanon Stadium	Uttaradit Provincial Stadium
Capacity: 5,500	Capacity: 2,500	Capacity: 5,000	Capacity: 5,000	Capacity: 30,000	Capacity: 3,245

== Championship history ==
=== Champions of the 2nd tier Thai football league system ===
#	Season	Champions	Runner-up	Third place
1	1997–98	Krung Thai Bank	Osotsapa	Thailand Tobacco Monopoly
2	1998–99	Bangkok Bank of Commerce	Assumption College Sriracha	Royal Thai Navy
3	1999–2000	Royal Thai Police	Royal Thai Navy	Rajpracha
4	2000–01	Tobacco Monopoly	Bangkok Christian College	Rajpracha
5	2001–02	Bangkok Christian College	Thai Military Bank	Bangkok University
6	2002–03	Bangkok University	Royal Thai Navy	Provincial Electricity Authority
7	2003–04	TOT	PEA	Royal Thai Army
8	2004–05	Royal Thai Army	Thai Honda	Royal Thai Police
9	2005–06	Royal Thai Police	Royal Thai Navy	Coke-Bangpra
10	2007	Customs Department	Chula-Sinthana	Coke-Bangpra
11	2008	Muangthong United	Sriracha	Royal Thai Navy
12	2009	Police United	Royal Thai Army	Sisaket
13	2010	Sriracha	Khon Kaen	Chiangrai United
14	2011	Songkhla	Chainat	BBCU
15	2012	Ratchaburi	Suphanburi	Bangkok United
16	2013	Air Force AVIA	Singhtarua	PTT Rayong
17	2014	Nakhon Ratchasima	Saraburi	Siam Navy
18	2015	Police United	Pattaya United	Sukhothai
19	2016	Thai Honda	Ubon UMT United	Port
20	2017	Chainat Hornbill	Air Force Central	PT Prachuap
21	2018	PTT Rayong	Trat	Chiangmai
22	2019	BG Pathum United	Police Tero	Rayong
#	Season	Champions	Runner-up	Play-off winner
23	2020–21	Nongbua Pitchaya	Chiangmai United	Khon Kaen United
24	2021–22	Lamphun Warriors	Sukhothai	Lampang
25	2022–23	Nakhon Pathom United	Trat	Uthai Thani
26	2023–24	Nakhon Ratchasima	Nongbua Pitchaya	Rayong
27	2024–25	Chonburi	Ayutthaya United	Kanchanaburi Power
28	2025–26	Rasisalai United	Sisaket United	Pattani
29	2026–27			

=== Number of wins ===
Club	Champions
Police United	4 (1999–2000, 2005–06, 2009, 2015)
Nakhon Ratchasima	2 (2014, 2023–24)
Krung Thai Bank	1 (1997–98)
Bangkok Bank of Commerce	1 (1998–99)
TTM	1 (2000–01)
Bangkok Christian College	1 (2001–02)
Bangkok University	1 (2002–03)
TOT	1 (2003–04)
Royal Thai Army	1 (2004–05)
Customs Department	1 (2007)
Muangthong United	1 (2008)
Sriracha	1 (2010)
Songkhla United	1 (2011)
Ratchaburi	1 (2012)
Air Force AVIA	1 (2013)
Thai Honda Ladkrabang	1 (2016)
Chainat Hornbill	1 (2017)
PTT Rayong	1 (2018)
BG Pathum United	1 (2019)
Nongbua Pitchaya	1 (2020–21)
Lamphun Warriors	1 (2021–22)
Nakhon Pathom United	1 (2022–23)
Chonburi	1 (2024–25)
Rasisalai United	1 (2025–26)

== Awards ==
=== Prize money ===
As of 2023-24 season

- Champion: 5,000,000 Baht
- Runner-up: 3,000,000
- Third place: 1,000,000
- Fourth place: 500,000
- Fifth place: 300,000
- Sixth place: 100,000
- Seventh place: 50,000

=== Top scorers ===
Season	Top scorer	Club	Goals
2008	(Thailand) Tanongsak Promdard	Raj-Vithi	18
2009	(Thailand) Wutthipong Kerdkul	Rattana Bundit	27
2010	(Thailand) Chainarong Tathong	Chula United	19
2011	(Thailand) Adisak Srikampang (Thailand) Phuwadol Suwannachart	PTT Rayong; Chainat	21
2012	(England) Lee Tuck	Bangkok	23
2013	(Brazil) Leandro	Singhtarua	24
2014	(Ivory Coast) Marc Landry Babo	Angthong	19
2015	(Brazil) Felipe Ferreira (Thailand) Tana Chanabut	Sukhothai; Police United	25
2016	(North Macedonia) Hristijan Kirovski	Prachuap	17
2017	(Brazil) Jonatan Ferreira Reis	Kasetsart	28
2018	(Brazil) Barros Tardeli	Trat	21
2019	(Brazil) Tiago Chulapa	Rayong	19
2020–21	(Brazil) Paulo Conrado	Khon Kaen United	25
2021–22	(Brazil) Thales Lima	Udon Thani (13) / Lamphun Warriors (9)	22
2022–23	(Brazil) Ricardo Santos	Uthai Thani	28
2023–24	(Brazil) Deyvison Fernandes	Nakhon Ratchasima	22
2024–25	(Brazil) Wellington Adão	Phrae United	23
2025–26	(Thailand) Arthit Boodjinda	Khon Kaen United	18

== See also ==
- Football records in Thailand
