= 2017 Thai League T1 =

Thai League
- Season: 2017
- Champions: Buriram United
- Relegated: Thai Honda Ladkrabang; Sisaket; Super Power Samut Prakan
- Qualified to 2018 ACL: Buriram United (group stage); SCG Muangthong United (Preliminary round 2); Chiangrai United (Preliminary round 2)
- Matches: 306
- Goals: 1,037 (3.39 per match)
- Top goalscorer: Dragan Boškovic (38 goals)
- Biggest home win: 8 goals Bangkok Glass 8–0 Super Power Samut Prakan (17 June 2017); SCG Muangthong United 9–1 Super Power Samut Prakan (30 June 2017)
- Biggest away win: 7 goals Super Power Samut Prakan 0–7 Buriram United (6 August 2017)
- Highest scoring: 11 goals Pattaya United 9–2 Super Power Samut Prakan (5 July 2017)
- Longest winning run: 11 matches Buriram United
- Longest unbeaten run: 21 matches Buriram United
- Longest winless run: 29 matches Super Power Samut Prakan
- Longest losing run: 27 matches Super Power Samut Prakan
- Highest attendance: 32,600; Buriram United 2–0 SCG Muangthong United (3 April 2017)
- Lowest attendance: 300; Super Power Samut Prakan 0–1 Thai Honda Ladkrabang (17 May 2017)
- Total attendance: 1,399,728
- Average attendance: 4,604
- All statistics correct as of 18 November 2017.

The 2017 Thai League T1 (also known as the Toyota Thai League for sponsorship reasons) was the 21st season of the Thai League, the top Thai professional league for association football clubs, since its establishment in 1996. A total of 18 teams will compete in the league. The season began on 11 February 2017. Fixtures for the 2017 season were announced on 12 January 2017.

Muangthong United are the defending champions, having won the Thai Premier League title the previous season. Thai Honda Ladkrabang, Ubon UMT United and Port have entered as the three promoted teams from the 2016 Thai League 2.

== Changes from last season ==
=== Team changes ===
==== From Thai League ====
Relegated to 2017 Thai League 2
- Army United
- Chainat Hornbill
- BBCU

==== To Thai League ====
Promoted from 2016 Thai Division 1 League
- Thai Honda Ladkrabang
- Ubon UMT United
- Port

=== Stadium changes ===
- BEC Tero Sasana used the Boonyachinda Stadium, a change from the previous season where they used the 72nd Anniversary Stadium as their home ground in 2016.
- Ubon UMT United used the UMT Stadium, a change from the previous season where they used the Tung Burapha Stadium as their home ground in 2016.

== Teams ==
There are 18 clubs in the league, with three promoted teams from Thai League 2 replacing the three teams that were relegated from Thai League T1 following the 2016 season. All clubs that secured Thai League status for the season were subject to approval by the AFC Club Licensing before becoming eligible to participate.

Army United, Chainat Hornbill and BBCU were relegated at the end of the 2016 season after finishing in the bottom three places of the table. They were replaced by 2016 Thai League 2 champions Thai Honda Ladkrabang, 2nd place Ubon UMT United and 3rd place Port, were promoted to bring the total teams in the league to 18.

Ubon UMT United was founded in 2015, they finishing as Thai League 2 runners up in 2016, and earned promotion to the Thai League T1 for the first time in their history.

=== Stadium and locations ===
Locations of the 2017 Thai League teams
Football clubs in Bangkok Metropolitan Region

Team	Location	Stadium	Capacity
Bangkok Glass	Pathum Thani	Leo Stadium	13,000
Bangkok Glass	Pathum Thani	Thupatemi Stadium (Temporary on 8 Nov. 2017)	25,000
Bangkok United	Pathum Thani	Thammasat Stadium	25,000
BEC Tero Sasana	Bangkok	Boonyachinda Stadium	3,550
Buriram United	Buriram	i-mobile Stadium	32,600
Chiangrai United	Chiangrai	Singha Stadium	11,354
Chonburi	Chonburi	Chonburi Stadium	8,680
Nakhon Ratchasima Mazda	Nakhon Ratchasima	80th Birthday Stadium	24,641
Navy	Chonburi	Sattahip Navy Stadium	6,000
Pattaya United	Chonburi	Nong Prue Stadium	5,500
Port	Bangkok	PAT Stadium	7,000
Ratchaburi Mitr Phol	Ratchaburi	Mitr Phol Stadium	10,000
SCG Muangthong United	Nonthaburi	SCG Stadium	14,890
SCG Muangthong United	Bangkok	Rajamangala Stadium (Temporary on 30 Jul. 2017)	49,722
Sisaket	Sisaket	Sri Nakhon Lamduan Stadium	10,000
Sukhothai	Sukhothai	Thung Thalay Luang Stadium	8,000
Super Power Samut Prakan	Samut Prakan	Samut Prakarn SAT Stadium (Keha Bang Phli)	5,100
Suphanburi	Suphanburi	Suphanburi Provincial Stadium	25,000
Thai Honda Ladkrabang	Bangkok	72nd Anniversary Stadium (Min Buri)	8,000
Ubon UMT United	Ubon Ratchathani	UMT Stadium	6,000

=== Sponsoring ===
Team	Kit manufacturer	Main sponsor
Bangkok Glass	Nike	Leo Beer
Bangkok United	Ari	True
BEC Tero Sasana	FBT	Chang
Buriram United	Made by club	Chang
Chiangrai United	Made by club	Singha Park
Chonburi	Nike	Chang
Nakhon Ratchasima Mazda	Made by club	Mazda
Navy	Made by club	HR-Pro
Pattaya United	Ari	SANWA
Port	Grand Sport	Muang Thai
Ratchaburi Mitr Phol	Ari	Mitr Phol
SCG Muangthong United	Grand Sport	SCG
Sisaket	Ari	Muang Thai
Sukhothai	Made by club	Chang
Super Power Samut Prakan	FBT	Loso-D
Suphanburi	Warrix	Chang
Thai Honda Ladkrabang	KELA	Honda
Ubon UMT United	Eureka Sports	UMT

=== Personnel ===
Note: Flags indicate national team as has been defined under FIFA eligibility rules. Players may hold more than one non-FIFA nationality.

Team	Manager	Head coach	Captain	Vice-captain
Bangkok Glass	Head coach as manager	(Australia) Aurelio Vidmar (Until Jul. 2017) (Thailand) Surachai Jaturapattarapong (Since Jul. 2017)	(Australia) Matt Smith	(Thailand) Peerapong Pichitchotirat
Bangkok United	(Thailand) Chanita Chanthratrap	(Brazil) Alexandré Pölking	(Thailand) Wittaya Madlam	(Thailand) Panupong Wongsa
BEC Tero Sasana	(Thailand) Thanya Wongnak	(Thailand) Uthai Boonmoh (Until Jun. 2017) (England) Mike Mulvey (Since Jun. 2017)	(Thailand) Datsakorn Thonglao	(Mali) Kalifa Cissé
Buriram United	(Thailand) Thadthep Pitakpulsin	(Serbia) Ranko Popović (Until Jun. 2017) (Montenegro) Božidar Bandović (Since Jun. 2017)	(Thailand) Suchao Nuchnum	(Thailand) Jakkaphan Kaewprom
Chiangrai United	(Thailand) Prach Malarat	(Brazil) Alexandre Gama	(Thailand) Tanaboon Kesarat	(Thailand) Pratum Chuthong
Chonburi	Head coach as manager	(Thailand) Therdsak Chaiman (Resigned at season end)	(Thailand) Chonlatit Jantakam	(Thailand) Therdsak Chaiman
Nakhon Ratchasima Mazda	(Thailand) Chairat Senaweenin	(Serbia) Miloš Joksić	(Thailand) Chalermpong Kerdkaew	(Thailand) Metee Taweekulkarn
Navy	(Thailand) Ratthatee Wachirasirisan	(Thailand) Somchai Chuayboonchum	(Thailand) Nataporn Phanrit	(Thailand) Seksan Chaothonglang
Pattaya United	(Thailand) Karn Chanrat	(Thailand) Surapong Kongthep	(South Korea) Lee Won-young	(Thailand) Chainarong Tathong
Port	(Thailand) Ong-art Kosinka	(Thailand) Jadet Meelarp (Until Jun. and since Sep. 2017) (Thailand) Kiatisuk Senamuang (Jun. to Sep. 2017)	(Spain) David Rochela	(Thailand) Wuttichai Tathong
Ratchaburi Mitr Phol	(Thailand) Thanawat Nitikarnchana	(Spain) Pacheta (Resigned at season end)	(Thailand) Apiwat Ngaolamhin	(Japan) Takafumi Akahoshi
SCG Muangthong United	(Thailand) Piansak Onsam-ang	(Thailand) Totchtawan Sripan	(Thailand) Teerasil Dangda	(Thailand) Kawin Thamsatchanan
Sisaket	(Thailand) Suriyan Cheamcheang	(Thailand) Dusit Chalermsan (Until Mar. 2017) (Bulgaria) Velizar Popov (Mar. to Aug. 2017) (Thailand) Chalermwoot Sa-ngapol (Since Aug. 2017)	(Thailand) Ekkapan Jandakorn	(Thailand) Theerachai Ngamcharoen
Sukhothai	(Thailand) Khetpong Kullanathsiri	(Thailand) Somchai Makmool (Until Mar. 2017) (Thailand) Pairoj Borwonwatanadilok (Since Mar. 2017)	(Thailand) Yuttapong Srilakorn	(Japan) Hiromichi Katano
Super Power Samut Prakan	(Thailand) Pokkich Klaipech	(Thailand) Chalermwoot Sa-ngapol (Until Mar. 2017) (England) Jason Withe (Mar. to Jun. 2017) (Thailand) Apisit Kaikaew (Jun. to Sep. 2017) (Thailand) Suksan Khunsuk (Since Sep. 2017)	(Thailand) Ekaphan Inthasen	(Thailand) Samart Phetnoo
Suphanburi	(Thailand) Kriangkrai Wuttipanich	(Brazil) Sérgio Farias (Until Apr. 2017) (Thailand) Worrawoot Srimaka (Apr. to May 2017) (Nigeria) Adebayo Gbadebo (Since May 2017)	(Thailand) Sinthaweechai Hathairattanakool	(Thailand) Adul Lahsoh
Thai Honda Ladkrabang	Head coach as manager	(Thailand) Sirisak Yodyardthai (Until Apr. 2017) (Brazil) Leonardo Neiva (Apr. to Jul. 2017) (Thailand) Aktaporn Chalitaporn (Since Jul. 2017)	(Thailand) Watchara Mahawong	(Thailand) Decha Sa-ardchom
Ubon UMT United	(Thailand) Tharadon Saengsuk	(England) Scott Cooper	(Brazil) Victor	(Thailand) Nikom Somwang

=== Managerial changes ===
Team	Outgoing manager	Manner of departure	Date of vacancy	Week	Table	Incoming manager	Date of appointment
Sukhothai	(Thailand) Somchai Chuayboonchum	Sacked	26 September 2016	Pre-season		(Thailand) Somchai Makmool	27 September 2016
Chiangrai United	(Thailand) Teerasak Po-on	Sacked	20 October 2016	Pre-season		(Brazil) Alexandre Gama	20 October 2016
Sisaket	(Japan) Masahiro Wada	End of Contract	27 October 2016	Pre-season		(Thailand) Dusit Chalermsan	27 October 2016
Navy	(Brazil) Stefano Cugurra	Sacked	3 November 2016	Pre-season		(Thailand) Somchai Chuayboonchum	3 November 2016
BEC Tero Sasana	(Thailand) Surapong Kongthep	End of Contract	20 December 2016	Pre-season		(Thailand) Uthai Boonmoh	2 February 2017
Pattaya United	(South Korea) Kim Hak-chul	End of Contract	20 December 2016	Pre-season		(Thailand) Surapong Kongthep	20 December 2016
Sisaket	(Thailand) Dusit Chalermsan	Sacked	2 March 2017	3	18th	(Bulgaria) Velizar Popov	15 March 2017
Super Power Samut Prakan	(Thailand) Chalermwoot Sa-Ngapol	Resign	9 March 2017	5	18th	(England) Jason Withe	9 March 2017
Sukhothai	(Thailand) Somchai Makmool	Sacked	10 March 2017	5	16th	(Thailand) Pairoj Borwonwatanadilok	12 March 2017
Suphanburi	(Brazil) Sérgio Farias	Mutual consent	16 April 2017	8	14th	(Thailand) Worrawoot Srimaka	
Thai Honda Ladkrabang	(Thailand) Sirisak Yodyardthai	Sacked	30 April 2017	12	15th	(Brazil) Leonardo Neiva	
Super Power Samut Prakan	(England) Jason Withe	Resigned	1 June 2017		18th	(Thailand) Apisit Kaikaew	
BEC Tero Sasana	(Thailand) Uthai Boonmoh	Resigned	3 June 2017		10th	(England) Mike Mulvey	5 June 2017
Port	(Thailand) Jadet Meelarp	Mutual consent	22 June 2017		9th	(Thailand) Kiatisuk Senamuang	23 June 2017
Buriram United	(Serbia) Ranko Popović	Resigned	13 June 2017		1st	(Montenegro) Božidar Bandović	13 June 2017
Bangkok Glass	(Australia) Aurelio Vidmar	Mutual consent	10 July 2017		5th	(Thailand) Surachai Jaturapattarapong	
Thai Honda Ladkrabang	(Brazil) Leonardo Neiva	Sacked	29 July 2017		17th	(Thailand) Aktaporn Chalitaporn	30 July 2017
Sisaket	(Bulgaria) Velizar Popov	Resigned	1 August 2017		16th		
Super Power Samut Prakan	(Thailand) Apisit Kaikaew	Sacked	12 September 2017		18th	(Thailand) Suksan Khunsuk	12 September 2017
Port	(Thailand) Kiatisuk Senamuang	Resigned	20 September 2017		11th	(Thailand) Jadet Meelarp	20 September 2017

=== Foreign players ===
Other foreign players.
AFC quota players.
No foreign player registered.

The number of foreign players is restricted to five per T1 team. A team can use four foreign players on the field in each game, including at least one player from the AFC member countries (3+1).

Note :
(substituted off) : players who released during summer transfer window;
(substituted in) : players who registered during summer transfer window.
↔: players who have dual nationality by half-caste or naturalization.
→: players who left club after registered during second leg.

Club	Leg	Player 1	Player 2	Player 3	Player 4	Player 5
Bangkok Glass	First	(Costa Rica) Ariel Rodríguez	(Bolivia) Jhasmani Campos	(Spain) Toti	(Japan) Jurato Ikeda	(England) ↔ (Australia) Matt Smith
Bangkok Glass	Second	(Costa Rica) Ariel Rodríguez	(Bolivia) Jhasmani Campos	(Spain) Toti	(Japan) Jurato Ikeda	(England) ↔ (Australia) Matt Smith
Bangkok United	First	(Brazil) Gilberto Macena (substituted off)	(Nigeria) ↔ (Bahrain) Jaycee John (substituted off)	(France) ↔ (Portugal) Yohan Tavares	(Serbia) ↔ (North Macedonia) Mario Gjurovski	(Montenegro) Dragan Boškovic
Bangkok United	Second	(Nigeria) ↔ (Germany) Chinedu Ede (substituted in)	(Iran) Mehrdad Pooladi (substituted in)	(France) ↔ (Portugal) Yohan Tavares	(Serbia) ↔ (North Macedonia) Mario Gjurovski	(Montenegro) Dragan Boškovic
BEC Tero Sasana	First	(Brazil) Tartá (substituted off)	(South Korea) Kim Dong-chan (substituted off)	(Spain) Mario	(France) Michaël N'dri	(France) ↔ (Mali) Kalifa Cissé
BEC Tero Sasana	Second	(Namibia) Sadney Urikhob (substituted in)	(Slovenia) ↔ (Palestine) Jaka Ihbeisheh (substituted in)	(Spain) Mario	(France) Michaël N'dri	(France) ↔ (Mali) Kalifa Cissé
Buriram United	First	(Brazil) Rogérinho (substituted off)	(Iceland) Sölvi Ottesen (substituted off)	(Brazil) Diogo	(Brazil) Jajá Coelho	(South Korea) Go Seul-ki
Buriram United	Second	(Brazil) Rafael Bastos (substituted in)	(Spain) ↔ (Venezuela) Andrés Túñez (substituted in)	(Brazil) Diogo	(Brazil) Jajá Coelho	(South Korea) Go Seul-ki
Chiangrai United	First	(Brazil) ↔ (Australia) Henrique Silva (substituted off)	(Brazil) Felipe Azevedo	(Brazil) Vander	(Brazil) Everton Gonçalves	(Brazil) ↔ (Syria) Rafael Coelho
Chiangrai United	Second	(Brazil) Jandson (substituted in)	(Brazil) Felipe Azevedo	(Brazil) Vander	(Brazil) Everton Gonçalves	(Brazil) ↔ (Syria) Rafael Coelho
Chonburi	First	(Brazil) André Luís (substituted off)	(Brazil) Renan Marques	(Ivory Coast) Fodé Diakité	(Ghana) Prince Amponsah	(Japan) Ryotaro Nakano
Chonburi	Second	(Brazil) Thiago Cunha (substituted in)	(Brazil) Renan Marques	(Ivory Coast) Fodé Diakité	(Ghana) Prince Amponsah	(Japan) Ryotaro Nakano
Nakhon Ratchasima; Mazda	First	(North Macedonia) Krste Velkoski (substituted off)	(Brazil) Antonio Pina	(Ghana) Dominic Adiyiah	(Nigeria) ↔ (Indonesia) Victor Igbonefo	
Nakhon Ratchasima; Mazda	Second	(Brazil) Paulo Rangel (substituted in)	(Brazil) Antonio Pina	(Ghana) Dominic Adiyiah	(Nigeria) ↔ (Indonesia) Victor Igbonefo	
Navy	First	(Germany) Björn Lindemann (substituted off)	(Nigeria) Julius Oiboh (substituted off)	(Brazil) Rodrigo Vergilio	(Nigeria) Adefolarin Durosinmi	(South Korea) Bang Seung-hwan
Navy	Second	(Brazil) André Luís (substituted in)	(Japan) Seiya Kojima (substituted in)	(Brazil) Rodrigo Vergilio	(Nigeria) Adefolarin Durosinmi	(South Korea) Bang Seung-hwan
Pattaya United	First	(Serbia) Milan Bubalo (substituted off)	(Brazil) Wellington Priori	(Serbia) Miloš Stojanović	(South Korea) Kim Tae-yeon	(South Korea) Lee Won-young
Pattaya United	Second	(Serbia) Aleksandar Jevtić (substituted in)	(Brazil) Wellington Priori	(Serbia) Miloš Stojanović	(South Korea) Kim Tae-yeon	(South Korea) Lee Won-young
Port	First	(Serbia) Andrija Kaluđerović (substituted off)	(Brazil) Josimar	(Spain) David Rochela	(Spain) Sergio Suárez	(Japan) Genki Nagasato
Port	Second	(Chile) ↔ (Palestine) Matías Jadue (substituted in)	(Brazil) Josimar	(Spain) David Rochela	(Spain) Sergio Suárez	(Japan) Genki Nagasato
Ratchaburi Mitr Phol	First		(Brazil) Carlos (substituted off)	(France) ↔ (Cameroon) Marcel Essombé	(France) ↔ (Morocco) Alharbi El Jadeyaoui	(Japan) Takafumi Akahoshi
Ratchaburi Mitr Phol	Second	(Paraguay) Javier Acuña (substituted in)	(France) ↔ (Democratic Republic of the Congo) Joël Sami (substituted in)	(France) ↔ (Cameroon) Marcel Essombé	(France) ↔ (Morocco) Alharbi El Jadeyaoui	(Japan) Takafumi Akahoshi
SCG Muangthong United	First		(Spain) Xisco (substituted off)	(Brazil) Célio	(Japan) Naoaki Aoyama	(South Korea) Lee Ho
SCG Muangthong United	Second	(Brazil) Leandro Assumpção (substituted in)	(Brazil) Heberty (substituted in)	(Brazil) Célio	(Japan) Naoaki Aoyama	(South Korea) Lee Ho
Sisaket	First	(Brazil) Leandro Assumpção (substituted off)	(Japan) Yusei Ogasawara (substituted off)	(Brazil) Denis Silva	(Democratic Republic of the Congo) ↔ (England) Leroy Lita	(Uganda) ↔ (Australia) Isaka Cernak
Sisaket	Second	(Argentina) Mariano Berriex (substituted in)	(Germany) Björn Lindemann (substituted in) →	(Brazil) Denis Silva	(Democratic Republic of the Congo) ↔ (England) Leroy Lita	(Uganda) ↔ (Australia) Isaka Cernak
Sukhothai	First	(Montenegro) Admir Adrović (substituted off)	(Kyrgyzstan) Anton Zemlianukhin (substituted off)	(Ivory Coast) Bireme Diouf	(Madagascar) John Baggio	(Japan) Hiromichi Katano
Sukhothai	Second	(Brazil) Rodrigo Maranhão (substituted in)	(South Korea) Jung Myung-oh (substituted in)	(Ivory Coast) Bireme Diouf	(Madagascar) John Baggio	(Japan) Hiromichi Katano
Super Power; Samut Prakan	First	(Namibia) Sadney Urikhob (substituted off)	(France) Anthony Moura (substituted off)	(Brazil) Moreira	(Bulgaria) Lyuben Nikolov	(South Korea) Lee Keon-pil
Super Power; Samut Prakan	Second	(Chile) Ramsés Bustos (substituted in)	(Laos) Ketsada Souksavanh (substituted in)	(Brazil) Moreira	(Bulgaria) Lyuben Nikolov	(South Korea) Lee Keon-pil
Suphanburi	First	(Costa Rica) Diego Madrigal (substituted off)	(Brazil) ↔ (Syria) Gilson Alves (substituted off)	(Argentina) Nicolás Vélez	(Brazil) Dellatorre	(Brazil) ↔ (Syria) Marcelo Xavier
Suphanburi	Second	(Brazil) Elizeu (substituted in)	(Namibia) Lazarus Kaimbi (substituted in)	(Argentina) Nicolás Vélez	(Brazil) Dellatorre	(Brazil) ↔ (Syria) Marcelo Xavier
Thai Honda Ladkrabang	First	(Brazil) Diego Assis (substituted off)	(Japan) Tatsuro Inui (substituted off)	(Brazil) Ricardo Jesus	(Brazil) Rafinha	(Japan) Michitaka Akimoto
Thai Honda Ladkrabang	Second	(Brazil) Gustavo Claudio (substituted in)	(Brazil) Roninho (substituted in)	(Brazil) Ricardo Jesus	(Brazil) Rafinha	(Japan) Michitaka Akimoto
Ubon UMT United	First	(Argentina) Mariano Berriex (substituted off)	(Brazil) Tiago Chulapa (substituted off)	(Brazil) Victor	(Kosovo) ↔ (Germany) Bajram Nebihi	(Japan) Kenta Yamazaki
Ubon UMT United	Second	(Brazil) Thiago (substituted in)	(Brazil) Carlão (substituted in)	(Brazil) Victor	(Kosovo) ↔ (Germany) Bajram Nebihi	(Japan) Kenta Yamazaki

== League table ==
=== Standings ===
Pos	Team	Pld	W	D	L	GF	GA	GD	Pts	Qualification or relegation
1	Buriram United (C, Q)	34	27	5	2	85	22	+63	86	Qualification to 2018 AFC Champions League Group stage
2	SCG Muangthong United (Q)	34	22	6	6	79	29	+50	72	Qualification to 2018 AFC Champions League Preliminary round 2
3	Bangkok United	34	21	3	10	97	57	+40	66	
4	Chiangrai United (Q)	34	18	6	10	67	42	+25	60	Qualification to 2018 AFC Champions League Preliminary round 2 (Note: Chiangrai United qualified for the 2018 AFC Champions League Preliminary round 2 as winners of the 2017 Thai FA Cup.)
5	Bangkok Glass	34	16	8	10	63	44	+19	56	
6	Ratchaburi Mitr Phol	34	16	7	11	63	49	+14	55	
7	Chonburi	34	15	8	11	59	59	0	53	
8	Pattaya United	34	15	6	13	60	53	+7	51	
9	Port	34	14	8	12	60	63	−3	50	
10	Ubon UMT United	34	12	11	11	55	54	+1	47	
11	Suphanburi	34	11	10	13	52	58	−6	43	
12	Nakhon Ratchasima Mazda	34	10	11	13	42	48	−6	41	
13	Navy	34	10	10	14	42	50	−8	40	
14	BEC Tero Sasana	34	10	9	15	42	57	−15	39	
15	Sukhothai	34	8	12	14	54	66	−12	36	
16	Thai Honda Ladkrabang (R)	34	8	4	22	43	68	−25	28	Relegation to the 2018 Thai League 2
17	Sisaket (R)	34	6	5	23	43	90	−47	23	Relegation to the 2018 Thai League 2
18	Super Power Samut Prakan (R)	34	1	3	30	31	128	−97	6	Relegation to the 2018 Thai League 2

Updated to match(es) played on 18 November 2017. Source: Thai League
Rules for classification: 1) Points; 2) Head-to-head points; 3) Head-to-head goals difference; 4) Head-to-head goals scored; 5) Overall goals difference; 6) Overall goals scored; 7) Fair play points; 8) Play-off without extra time;).
(C) Champions; (Q) Qualified for the phase indicated; (R) Relegated

=== Positions by round ===
The table lists the positions of teams after each week of matches. In order to preserve chronological evolvements, any postponed matches are not included in the round at which they were originally scheduled, but added to the full round they were played immediately afterwards. For example, if a match is scheduled for matchday 13, but then postponed and played between days 16 and 17, it will be added to the standings for day 16.

Team ╲ Round	1	2	3	4	5	6	7	8	9	10	11	12	13	14	15	16	17	18	19	20	21	22	23	24	25	26	27	28	29	30	31	32	33	34
Buriram United	8	5	4	3	2	3	3	3	3	2	2	2	2	2	2	2	2	1	1	1	1	1	1	1	1	1	1	1	1	1	1	1	1	1
SCG Muangthong United	2	3	2	1	1	1	2	1	1	1	1	1	1	1	1	1	1	2	2	2	2	2	2	2	2	2	2	2	2	2	2	2	2	2
Bangkok United	6	10	5	5	7	10	9	10	9	7	8	9	8	6	5	5	6	6	5	4	4	3	3	3	3	3	3	3	3	3	3	3	3	3
Chiangrai United	1	1	3	2	3	2	1	2	2	3	3	3	3	3	3	3	3	4	3	3	3	4	4	4	4	4	5	4	4	4	4	4	4	4
Bangkok Glass	17	14	7	6	6	5	4	5	4	4	4	4	4	4	4	4	4	3	4	5	5	5	5	5	5	5	4	5	5	5	5	5	5	5
Ratchaburi Mitr Phol	11	13	16	16	12	7	13	9	10	11	10	8	5	7	8	9	9	7	7	7	7	7	7	7	7	7	7	7	7	6	7	6	6	6
Chonburi	9	12	15	17	13	8	7	7	7	8	7	6	7	5	6	6	5	5	6	6	6	6	6	6	6	6	6	6	6	7	6	7	7	7
Pattaya United	15	11	14	10	15	12	10	12	13	13	14	14	13	14	14	14	14	14	15	15	15	13	12	9	8	8	8	8	8	8	8	8	8	8
Port	10	6	9	8	8	9	8	8	8	6	5	7	9	10	7	7	7	8	9	9	8	8	9	10	10	10	11	13	11	9	9	9	9	9
Ubon UMT United	4	2	1	4	4	4	5	4	6	9	9	10	10	9	10	8	8	9	8	10	9	9	8	8	9	9	9	9	9	10	10	10	10	10
Suphanburi	5	8	11	13	14	11	12	14	11	10	11	11	11	11	12	12	11	11	11	11	11	11	11	11	12	11	13	11	10	11	11	11	11	11
Nakhon Ratchasima Mazda	7	7	6	9	11	15	11	11	12	12	13	13	12	12	11	11	12	12	12	12	14	15	14	14	14	14	14	14	13	13	12	12	12	12
Navy	13	16	12	12	10	13	14	15	15	14	12	12	14	13	13	13	13	13	13	13	12	12	13	13	13	12	12	12	14	14	13	13	14	13
BEC Tero Sasana	3	4	8	7	5	6	6	6	5	5	6	5	6	8	9	10	10	10	10	8	10	10	10	12	11	13	10	10	12	12	14	14	13	14
Sukhothai	14	17	10	11	16	16	16	16	16	16	16	16	15	16	17	17	15	15	14	14	13	14	15	15	15	15	15	15	15	15	15	15	15	15
Thai Honda Ladkrabang	12	9	13	14	9	14	15	13	14	15	15	15	16	15	15	15	16	16	17	17	17	17	17	17	17	17	17	17	17	17	17	16	16	16
Sisaket	16	18	18	15	17	17	17	17	17	17	17	17	17	17	16	16	17	17	16	16	16	16	16	16	16	16	16	16	16	16	16	17	17	17
Super Power Samut Prakan	18	15	17	18	18	18	18	18	18	18	18	18	18	18	18	18	18	18	18	18	18	18	18	18	18	18	18	18	18	18	18	18	18	18

Leader and qualification to the 2018 AFC Champions League Group stage
Qualification to the 2018 AFC Champions League Preliminary round 2
Relegation to the 2018 Thai League 2

Source: Thai League

=== Results by match played ===
Team ╲ Round	1	2	3	4	5	6	7	8	9	10	11	12	13	14	15	16	17	18	19	20	21	22	23	24	25	26	27	28	29	30	31	32	33	34
Buriram United	D	W	W	W	W	D	W	D	W	W	W	L	L	W	W	D	W	W	W	W	W	W	D	W	W	W	W	W	W	W	W	W	W	W
SCG Muangthong United	W	W	W	W	W	W	L	W	W	D	W	W	W	L	L	L	W	D	W	W	D	W	D	W	D	W	W	W	W	D	L	W	L	W
Bangkok United	W	L	W	D	L	L	W	L	W	W	D	L	W	W	W	W	L	W	W	W	W	W	W	W	W	L	W	L	W	W	W	D	L	L
Chiangrai United	W	W	D	W	W	W	W	L	W	L	W	D	D	L	W	W	L	W	W	W	L	L	W	W	D	L	L	W	W	D	W	L	L	D
Bangkok Glass	L	D	W	W	D	W	W	L	W	W	L	W	D	W	W	L	W	W	D	L	W	L	W	W	D	D	W	L	D	W	D	L	L	L
Ratchaburi Mitr Phol	D	L	D	L	W	W	L	W	D	D	W	W	W	D	L	L	W	W	L	W	D	D	W	L	W	L	W	W	L	W	L	W	W	L
Chonburi	D	L	D	L	W	W	W	W	L	D	W	W	D	W	L	W	W	W	L	L	W	W	L	D	L	W	D	W	D	L	D	L	W	L
Pattaya United	L	W	L	D	L	W	W	L	L	L	L	W	W	L	L	W	L	L	L	W	D	W	W	W	W	W	D	D	L	W	D	W	D	W
Port	D	W	L	W	L	D	W	W	L	W	W	L	L	D	W	W	D	L	L	D	W	L	L	L	D	D	L	L	W	W	D	W	W	W
Ubon UMT United	W	W	W	D	L	W	L	D	L	L	W	L	D	W	L	W	W	L	D	L	D	D	W	L	D	D	D	D	D	L	L	W	W	W
Suphanburi	W	L	L	L	D	W	D	L	W	W	L	W	D	D	L	L	W	W	D	L	L	D	W	D	L	D	L	W	W	L	L	D	W	D
Nakhon Ratchasima Mazda	W	D	D	D	L	L	W	D	D	L	D	D	W	D	W	L	L	L	W	L	L	L	W	W	L	D	L	D	W	L	W	L	W	D
Navy	L	L	W	L	W	L	L	D	D	D	W	D	L	W	L	W	L	L	W	D	D	W	L	W	D	D	D	D	L	L	W	L	L	W
BEC Tero Sasana	W	D	L	W	W	L	D	W	D	W	L	W	D	L	D	L	L	W	L	W	L	D	L	L	D	L	W	D	L	D	L	L	W	L
Sukhothai	L	L	W	L	L	L	L	D	W	L	L	D	D	L	L	W	W	D	W	W	D	D	L	L	W	D	D	L	D	L	D	W	D	D
Thai Honda Ladkrabang	L	W	L	L	W	L	L	W	L	L	L	L	L	W	W	L	L	L	L	L	L	D	L	L	L	L	W	D	L	D	W	L	W	D
Sisaket	L	L	L	W	L	L	L	D	L	W	L	L	D	L	W	W	D	L	D	L	W	L	L	L	D	W	L	L	L	L	L	L	L	L
Super Power Samut Prakan	L	D	L	L	L	L	L	L	L	L	L	L	L	L	L	L	L	L	L	L	L	L	L	L	L	L	L	L	L	W	D	L	L	D

Source: Thai League
W = Win; D = Draw; L = Loss

== Results ==
Home \ Away	BKG	BKU	BEC	BRU	CRU	CHO	NAKR	RTN	PATU	POR	RAT	MTU	SIS	SUKH	SPSP	SUP	THL	UUMT
Bangkok Glass		3–2	4–0	2–1	2–1	3–0	1–0	3–0	2–5	0–0	3–2	0–4	6–0	2–2	8–0	2–1	0–1	1–0
Bangkok United	5–4		5–2	1–3	0–3	7–2	2–0	1–0	5–1	6–2	2–1	2–4	5–1	4–2	4–0	4–0	5–4	3–2
BEC Tero Sasana	1–2	2–0		2–2	3–1	1–3	3–1	0–0	2–0	2–1	0–0	0–1	1–0	1–1	3–1	2–2	3–2	2–1
Buriram United	1–0	2–1	4–0		1–0	2–2	4–0	2–0	2–0	1–0	3–4	2–0	3–0	5–2	3–0	3–0	2–0	4–0
Chiangrai United	3–0	0–2	1–1	1–2		3–1	1–0	3–2	4–1	1–3	4–0	0–1	3–1	6–0	4–0	2–0	3–1	1–1
Chonburi	1–1	1–5	5–1	1–2	3–1		0–0	0–0	1–0	2–1	2–0	0–3	1–0	3–2	3–1	1–1	5–0	1–1
Nakhon Ratchasima Mazda	2–1	0–0	1–1	0–2	0–1	5–2		1–1	2–2	0–0	1–1	0–1	3–0	1–1	4–0	2–2	1–0	2–1
Navy	2–3	2–1	0–0	1–2	2–0	2–2	0–0		2–2	2–2	1–0	1–2	1–0	3–1	3–1	0–1	1–0	3–2
Pattaya United	4–2	1–0	3–0	0–2	2–2	2–1	3–1	2–3		2–5	3–0	0–3	2–1	1–1	9–2	1–3	1–0	0–1
Port	0–3	0–3	2–1	0–0	1–2	1–3	3–1	1–0	0–2		1–1	1–1	5–3	3–3	5–3	3–2	3–1	1–0
Ratchaburi Mitr Phol	1–0	1–2	1–0	0–2	1–1	5–1	4–0	2–1	1–0	2–3		1–1	5–2	1–1	6–2	4–1	3–2	1–0
SCG Muangthong United	2–0	4–0	2–1	1–1	4–2	3–1	2–0	4–0	0–0	2–3	3–0		3–0	1–0	9–1	3–0	0–1	2–3
Sisaket	0–0	2–7	2–1	1–5	1–2	1–2	3–3	4–2	0–2	2–2	0–3	2–2		3–1	1–0	2–2	2–5	0–2
Sukhothai	1–1	1–4	2–0	1–3	2–2	3–1	0–1	1–1	2–0	2–3	0–3	2–2	2–1		5–1	2–3	1–0	3–3
Super Power Samut Prakan	0–0	2–5	1–2	0–7	2–2	1–4	0–5	3–2	1–3	1–3	1–5	1–4	1–3	0–4		1–3	0–1	0–1
Suphanburi	1–1	1–1	3–2	0–1	1–2	0–1	4–0	2–0	0–3	2–0	1–1	1–4	4–1	1–1	3–1		2–1	1–2
Thai Honda Ladkrabang	0–2	1–0	2–1	1–5	0–3	1–3	1–2	0–2	0–0	5–1	1–2	1–0	2–3	0–1	2–2	2–2		4–4
Ubon UMT United	1–1	3–3	1–1	1–1	1–2	0–0	1–3	2–2	2–3	2–1	4–1	2–1	2–1	2–1	2–1	2–2	3–1	

Updated to match(es) played on 18 November 2017. Source: Thai League
Legend: Blue = home team win; Yellow = draw; Red = away team win.

== Season statistics ==
=== Top scorers ===
As of 18 November 2017.

Rank	Player	Club	Goals
1	(Montenegro) Dragan Bošković	Bangkok United	38
2	(Brazil) Jajá	Buriram United	34
3	(Brazil) Renan Marques	Chonburi	27
4	(Brazil) Diogo	Buriram United	26
5	(Brazil) Leandro Assumpção	Sisaket (11); SCG Muangthong United (13)	24
6	(Cameroon) Marcel Essombé	Ratchaburi Mitr Phol	20
7	(Brazil) Felipe Azevedo	Chiangrai United	18
8	(North Macedonia) Mario Gjurovski	Bangkok United	17
9	(Serbia) Miloš Stojanović	Pattaya United	15
9	(Brazil) Rodrigo Vergilio	Navy	15
9	(Thailand) Teerasil Dangda	SCG Muangthong United	15

=== Hat-tricks ===
Player	For	Against	Result	Date
(Thailand) Thitipan Puangchan	Chiangrai United	Super Power Samut Prakan	4–0	12 February 2017
(Thailand) Teeratep Winothai^{4}	Bangkok United	Port	6–2	25 February 2017
(Thailand) Supachok Sarachat	Buriram United	Thai Honda Ladkrabang	5–1	4 March 2017
(Montenegro) Dragan Bošković	Bangkok United	Ubon UMT United	3–3	5 March 2017
(Brazil) Leandro Assumpção	Sisaket	Nakhon Ratchasima Mazda	3–3	8 April 2017
(Spain) Xisco Jiménez	SCG Muangthong United	Super Power Samut Prakan	4–1	8 April 2017
(Montenegro) Dragan Bošković	Bangkok United	Chonburi	5–1	18 April 2017
(Montenegro) Dragan Bošković^{5}	Bangkok United	Pattaya United	5–1	23 April 2017
(Cameroon) Marcel Essombé	Ratchaburi Mitr Phol	Super Power Samut Prakan	5–1	30 April 2017
(North Macedonia) Mario Gjurovski	Bangkok United	Super Power Samut Prakan	5–2	6 May 2017
(Brazil) Diogo Luís Santo	Buriram United	Sukhothai	3–1	13 May 2017
(Brazil) Rodrigo Vergilio	Navy	Super Power Samut Prakan	3–1	14 May 2017
(Brazil) Rafael Coelho	Chiangrai United	Pattaya United	4–1	17 May 2017
(Brazil) Leandro Assumpção	Sisaket	Navy	4–2	17 May 2017
(Brazil) Leandro Assumpção	Sisaket	Thai Honda Ladkrabang	3–2	20 May 2017
(Thailand) Chatree Chimtalay	Bangkok Glass	Super Power Samut Prakan	8–0	17 June 2017
(Montenegro) Dragan Bošković	Bangkok United	Bangkok Glass	5–4	5 July 2017
(Thailand) Surachat Sareepim	Bangkok Glass	Bangkok United	4–5	5 July 2017
(Brazil) Paulo Rangel	Nakhon Ratchasima Mazda	Super Power Samut Prakan	5–0	8 July 2017
(Cameroon) Marcel Essombé	Ratchaburi Mitr Phol	Chonburi	5–1	8 July 2017
(Brazil) Jajá Coelho	Buriram United	Ubon UMT United	4–0	29 July 2017
(Brazil) Leandro Assumpção	SCG Muangthong United	Super Power Samut Prakan	9–1	30 July 2017
(Montenegro) Dragan Bošković^{4}	Bangkok United	Chonburi	7–2	5 August 2017
(Brazil) Jajá Coelho^{4}	Buriram United	Super Power Samut Prakan	7–0	6 August 2017
(Brazil) Jajá Coelho	Buriram United	Sisaket	5–1	16 September 2017
(Thailand) Kabfah Boonmatoon	Sukhothai	Ubon UMT United	3–3	16 September 2017
(Brazil) Jandson dos Santos	Chiangrai United	Sukhothai	6–0	20 September 2017
(Brazil) Heberty Fernandes	SCG Muangthong United	Bangkok United	4–0	20 September 2017
(Brazil) Jajá Coelho	Buriram United	Sukhothai	5–2	14 October 2017
(Montenegro) Dragan Bošković	Bangkok United	Sisaket	7–2	14 October 2017
(Brazil) Ricardo Jesus^{4}	Thai Honda Ladkrabang	Sisaket	5–2	8 November 2017

== Attendance ==
=== Overall statistics ===
Pos	Team	Total	High	Low	Average	Change
1	Buriram United	236,137	32,600	8,316	13,890	−10.7%
2	SCG Muangthong United	140,929	12,500	3,730	8,808	−9.9%
3	Suphanburi	129,316	17,559	1,928	7,606	−15.3%
4	Chiangrai United	111,182	11,354	1,574	6,540	+20.9%
5	Nakhon Ratchasima Mazda	95,421	12,250	1,583	5,613	−51.3%
6	Bangkok Glass	90,171	12,278	2,025	5,304	−11.5%
7	Sukhothai	73,007	7,780	2,481	4,294	−24.7%
8	Port	67,361	6,905	1,229	4,210	+38.4%^{†}
9	Ratchaburi Mitr Phol	62,577	9,999	1,459	3,681	−16.4%
10	Chonburi	59,972	8,469	2,130	3,527	−29.8%
11	Pattaya United	59,817	5,838	1,380	3,518	+21.5%
12	Ubon UMT United	54,719	5,845	640	3,218	+69.6%^{†}
13	Bangkok United	48,540	9,539	819	2,855	−14.0%
14	Sisaket	46,364	8,565	627	2,727	−43.4%
15	Navy	42,846	4,762	1,717	2,520	−18.2%
16	BEC Tero Sasana	30,876	3,517	1,070	1,816	−7.1%
17	Thai Honda Ladkrabang	25,936	5,565	560	1,525	+147.6%^{†}
18	Super Power Samut Prakan	24,557	5,059	300	1,444	−37.5%
	League total	1,399,728	32,600	300	4,604	−15.2%

Updated to games played on 18 November 2017
Source: Thai League
Notes:
^{†} Teams played previous season in Division 1

=== Attendance by home match played ===
Team \ Match played	1	2	3	4	5	6	7	8	9	10	11	12	13	14	15	16	17	Total
Bangkok Glass	12,278	6,040	5,766	5,162	4,987	6,552	8,419	4,723	4,372	4,555	3,859	4,096	3,841	4,943	5,121	3,432	2,025	90,171
Bangkok United	2,598	3,047	3,506	2,490	2,287	9,539	2,036	2,277	1,622	1,406	3,011	2,002	3,024	1,766	819	2,553	4,557	48,540
BEC Tero Sasana	3,517	3,214	1,402	1,605	1,561	1,070	1,254	1,700	3,160	1,353	1,753	1,216	1,485	1,486	1,800	1,645	1,655	30,876
Buriram United	29,891	10,398	10,509	32,600	8,896	12,681	9,397	8,316	15,123	8,467	9,356	14,725	14,189	15,649	10,313	9,860	15,767	236,137
Chiangrai United	11,354	7,548	8,652	6,168	8,417	11,309	7,274	5,057	2,021	6,569	7,785	4,850	5,380	2,950	4,160	1,574	10,114	111,182
Chonburi	6,278	8,469	2,266	3,265	2,412	2,585	2,466	4,668	3,795	2,669	2,623	2,886	2,290	4,776	2,576	2,130	3,818	59,972
Nakhon Ratchasima Mazda	12,250	9,018	4,114	4,785	4,531	4,227	5,835	6,571	5,163	10,082	8,429	7,042	4,209	2,254	2,388	1,583	2,940	95,421
Navy	4,762	2,622	3,415	1,961	2,259	2,419	2,242	2,072	2,407	2,275	2,574	2,381	2,220	3,489	2,177	1,854	1,717	42,846
Pattaya United	4,954	5,568	2,678	2,684	1,953	1,380	3,354	2,834	5,838	1,689	2,135	4,128	4,831	3,869	4,862	3,215	3,845	59,817
Port	5,524	6,592	4,535	6,905	4,550	4,106	4,193	3,004	3,868	6,574	3,931	4,932	3,682	1,283	1,229	Ban.2	2,453	67,361
Ratchaburi Mitr Phol	6,368	4,198	2,289	9,999	3,029	3,827	2,506	2,951	2,869	2,509	3,928	3,280	1,789	6,342	1,959	1,459	3,275	62,577
SCG Muangthong United	10,562	10,732	8,754	12,279	8,209	Ban.1	10,123	10,012	9,097	10,076	8,579	12,500	3,730	7,914	8,467	3,872	6,023	140,929
Sisaket	8,565	2,730	4,498	2,748	1,944	2,263	1,075	2,582	3,031	2,026	2,241	3,539	3,413	3,040	1,053	989	627	46,364
Sukhothai	4,968	3,473	2,504	4,085	3,393	4,134	2,614	7,540	3,240	4,564	7,780	3,098	6,350	3,701	2,481	2,802	6,280	73,007
Super Power Samut Prakan	1,971	1,361	1,296	5,059	869	772	300	1,940	1,700	847	989	3,191	2,086	308	499	612	757	24,557
Suphanburi	12,816	16,736	8,059	7,522	8,640	3,632	7,502	4,119	5,553	5,262	4,242	6,018	1,928	12,285	3,594	17,559	3,849	129,316
Thai Honda Ladkrabang	1,345	4,436	1,547	1,317	1,167	1,450	5,565	1,638	560	660	950	1,059	763	890	893	673	1,023	25,936
Ubon UMT United	3,673	5,813	3,483	5,845	5,139	2,735	3,029	2,345	1,325	1,853	4,137	3,365	1,946	640	5,215	2,118	2,058	54,719

Source: Thai League
Note:
Ban.1 Attendances on the match SCG Muangthong United vs. Port (17 May 2017) had banned by FA Thailand.
Ban.2 Attendances on the match Port vs. SCG Muangthong United (22 October 2017) had banned by FA Thailand.

== See also ==
- 2017 Thai League 2
- 2017 Thai League 3
- 2017 Thai League 4
- 2017 Thailand Amateur League
- 2017 Thai FA Cup
- 2017 Thai League Cup
- 2017 Thailand Champions Cup
- Thai Premier League All-Star Football
- List of foreign Thai League 1 players
