= 2016 Thai Division 1 League =

Thai Division 1 League
- Season: 2016
- Champions: Thai Honda Ladkrabang
- Promoted: Thai Honda Ladkrabang; Ubon UMT United; Port
- Matches: 192
- Goals: 541 (2.82 per match)
- Top goalscorer: Hristijan Kirovski (17 Goals)
- Biggest home win: Port 6–1 Nakhon Pathom (3 April 2016)
- Biggest away win: Samut Songkhram 0–3 Port (30 March 2016); Lampang 0–3 Port (21 May 2016)
- Highest scoring: Port 6–1 Nakhon Pathom (3 April 2016)
- Longest winning run: 7 matches Thai Honda Ladkrabang
- Longest unbeaten run: 14 matches Thai Honda Ladkrabang
- Longest winless run: 11 matches Chiangmai
- Longest losing run: 5 matches Krabi
- Highest attendance: 6,880; Chiangmai 1–3 PTT Rayong (16 March 2016)
- Lowest attendance: 29; Thai Honda 5–1 Samut Songkhram (3 July 2016)
- Total attendance: 421,049
- Average attendance: 2,192

2016 Thai League Division 1 (known as Yamaha League Division 1 for sponsorship reasons) was the 19th season of the League since its establishment in 1997. It is the feeder league for the Thai League T1. A total of 16 teams competed in the league this season.

Following the death of King Bhumibol Adulyadej, the Football Association of Thailand cancelled the remaining league season on 14 October 2016, with two rounds remaining.

Thai Honda were therefore crowned champions with Ubon UMT United and Port also promoted. Thai Honda and Ubon were already promoted before the announcement.

The following day however (15 October), FAT appeared to do a U-turn and announced that further discussions with key stake holders would determine whether the league campaign would continue. Although these discussions were predominantly on the back of PLT league clubs, the ruling could also effect the whole footballing structure.

On the 16 October, after a meeting of all top flight league clubs it was announced that the original decision to cancel the remaining games would stay in place, therefore crowning Thai Honda as champions.

== Changes from last season ==
=== Team changes ===
==== From Division 1 ====
Promoted to Thai League T1

- Pattaya United
- Sukhothai
- BBCU

Relegated to Regional League Division 2

- Phichit
- Ayutthaya
- Phuket
- TTM
- Trat

==== To Division 1 ====
Relegated from Thai League T1

- Port

Promoted from Regional League Division 2

- Ubon UMT United
- Khon Kaen United
- Rayong
- Lampang

==== Withdrawn clubs ====
- Police United withdrew from the 2016 campaign due to financial problems.
- TOT folded due to financial problems.
- Khon Kaen United was suspended due to a criminal case with eight games remaining.

== Teams ==
=== Stadium and locations ===
Locations of the Thai Division 1 League 2016 teams
Football clubs in Bangkok Metropolitan Region

Team	Location	Stadium	Capacity	Ref.
Air Force Central	Pathum Thani	Thupatemee Stadium	20,000	
Angthong	Angthong	Angthong Administrative Organization Stadium	6,500	
Bangkok	Bangkok	Chalerm Phrakiat Bang Mod Stadium	8,000	
Chiangmai	Chiang Mai	700th Anniversary Stadium	25,000	
Khonkaen United	Khonkaen	Khonkaen PAO. Stadium	7,000	
Krabi	Krabi	Krabi Provincial Stadium	6,000	
Lampang	Lampang	Lampang Provincial Stadium	5,500	
Nakhon Pathom United	Nakhon Pathom	Nakhon Pathom Sport School Stadium	2,141	
Port	Bangkok	PAT Stadium	12,308	
Prachuap	Prachuap Khiri Khan	Sam Ao Stadium	7,000	
PTT Rayong	Rayong	PTT Stadium	20,000	
Rayong	Rayong	Rayong Stadium	7,500	
Samut Songkhram	Samut Songkhram	Samut Songkhram Stadium	6,000	
Songkhla United	Songkhla	Na Thawi District Stadium	2,000	
Thai Honda Ladkrabang	Bangkok	72nd Anniversary Stadium (Min Buri)	15,000	
Ubon UMT United	Ubon Ratchathani	Tung Burapha Stadium	3,000	

=== Personnel and sponsoring ===
Note: Flags indicate national team as has been defined under FIFA eligibility rules. Players may hold more than one non-FIFA nationality.

Team	Head coach	Captain	Kit manufacturer	Shirt sponsor
Air Force Central	(Thailand) Sasom Pobprasert	(Croatia) Aleksandar Kapisoda	KELA	Central
Angthong	(Germany) Reiner Maurer	(Thailand) Peeratat Phoruendee	Ego Sports	M Wrap
Bangkok	(Thailand) Sutee Suksomkit	(Thailand) Wattanaporn Donmongkun	KELA	M2F
Chiangmai	(Japan) Sugao Kambe	(Ivory Coast) Henri Jöel	Made by club	Leo Beer
Khonkaen United	(Serbia) Ljubomir Ristovski	(Thailand) Sarayuth Chaikamdee	Made by club	Chang
Krabi	(Thailand) Pol Chomchuen	(Thailand) Anuwat Promsakul	FBT	Bangkok Airways
Lampang	(Thailand) Surachai Jirasirichote	(Thailand) Sirisak Musbu-ngor	Deffo	Bangkok Airways
Nakhon Pathom United	(Thailand) Thawatchai Damrong-Ongtrakul	(Thailand) Panuwat Yimsa-ngar	Made by club	Chang
Port	(Thailand) Jadet Meelarp	(Spain) David Rochela	Grand Sport	Muang Thai
Prachuap	(Thailand) Dusit Chalermsan	(Thailand) Rangsarit Sutthisa	Sakka Sport	PT
PTT Rayong	(South Korea) Lee Jun-ki	(Thailand) Phuritad Jarikanon	Sakka Sport	PTT
Rayong	(Thailand) Chusak Sribhum	(Thailand) Piyawat Thongman	Warrix Sports	Gulf
Samut Songkhram	(Thailand) Vimol Jankam	(Thailand) Apisak Kong-on	Warrix Sports	R Airlines
Songkhla United	(Thailand) Nopporn Eksatra	(Thailand) Chairat Madsiri	FBT	I-Mobile
Thai Honda Ladkrabang	(Thailand) Sirisak Yodyardthai	(Thailand) Watchara Mahawong	Kappa	Honda
Ubon UMT United	(Republic of Ireland) Scott Cooper	(Brazil) Victor Cardozo	Made by club	Ubon UMT United

=== Foreign players ===
The number of foreign players is restricted to five per TPL team. A team can use four foreign players on the field in each game, including at least one player from the AFC country.

Club	Player 1	Player 2	Player 3	Player 4	AFC Player	Former Player
Air Force Central	(Brazil) Leandro	(Brazil) Valdo	(Croatia) Aleksandar Kapisoda	(Montenegro) Petar Vukčević		
Angthong	(Ghana) Isaac Honny	(Ivory Coast) Bernard Doumbia	(Ivory Coast) Marc Landry Babo	(Japan) Terukazu Tanaka	(Japan) Yusuke Kato	
Bangkok	(Brazil) Douglas	(Cape Verde) David Silva	(France) William Gros	(Serbia) Nebojša Bastajić	(Japan) Junki Yokono	
Chiangmai	(Brazil) Felipe Ferreira	(Ivory Coast) Henri Jöel	(Ivory Coast) Kouassi Hermann	(Spain) Borja Navarro	(Australia) Goran Šubara	(France) Romain Gasmi
Khonkaen United	(Brazil) Nelisson	(Ivory Coast) Dagno Siaka	(Netherlands) Melvin de Leeuw	(Spain) Gorka Unda	(South Korea) Jeong Su-ho	
Krabi	(Brazil) Barros Tardeli	(Cameroon) Isaac Mbengan	(Ivory Coast) Koné Seydou	(Namibia) Tangeni Shipahu	(Japan) Ryohei Maeda	
Lampang	(Brazil) Fernando de Abreu	(Brazil) Maycon Calijuri	(Ivory Coast) Nenebi Tra Sylvestre	(Morocco) El Mehdi Sidqy	(Japan) Ryuki Kozawa	
Nakhon Pathom United	(Brazil) Almir	(Brazil) Eliel	(Ghana) Lesley Ablorh	(Nigeria) Amara Jerry	(Japan) Yusei Ogasawara	
Port	(Brazil) Rodrigo Maranhão	(Brazil) Wagner Carioca	(Spain) David Rochela	(Timor-Leste) Thiago Cunha	(Japan) Genki Nagasato	
Prachuap	(Brazil) Neto	(North Macedonia) Hristijan Kirovski	(Serbia) Uroš Stojanov	(South Korea) Kim Geun-chul	(South Korea) Kwon Dae-hee	
PTT Rayong	(Brazil) Alex Ruela	(Ivory Coast) Amadou Ouattara	(Japan) Yukiya Sugita	(Montenegro) Janko Simovic	(Japan) Goshi Okubo	
Rayong	(Cameroon) David Bayiha	(Cameroon) Paul Ekollo	(Iran) Saeed Salarzadeh	(Ivory Coast) Camara Souleymand	(Japan) Atsushi Takahashi	
Samut Songkhram	(Brazil) David Bala	(Jamaica) Sean Fraser	(Madagascar) Guy Hubert	(South Korea) Cho Kwang-hoon	(South Korea) Chang Seung-weon	
Songkhla United	(Brazil) Willen	(Spain) Francis Suárez	(Spain) Rufo Sánchez	(Spain) Sergio Suárez	(Timor-Leste) Diogo Rangel	
Thai Honda Ladkrabang	(Brazil) Rafinha	(Brazil) Ricardo Jesus	(Japan) Michitaka Akimoto	(Japan) Yuki Bamba	(Japan) Daiki Higuchi	
Ubon UMT United	(Brazil) Victor	(Montenegro) Ivan Knežević	(Saint Kitts and Nevis) Febian Brandy	(Trinidad and Tobago) Darryl Roberts	(Japan) Kenta Yamazaki	

== Results ==
=== League table ===
Pos	Team	Pld	W	D	L	GF	GA	GD	Pts	Qualification or relegation
1	Thai Honda (C, P)	26	14	10	2	46	23	+23	52	Promotion to 2017 Thai League 1
2	Ubon UMT United (P)	26	14	7	5	38	23	+15	49	Promotion to 2017 Thai League 1
3	Port (P)	26	13	8	5	55	30	+25	47	Promotion to 2017 Thai League 1
4	Air Force Central	26	11	9	6	44	29	+15	42	
5	Angthong	26	11	8	7	38	30	+8	41	
6	Songkhla United	26	10	9	7	35	33	+2	39	
7	Prachuap	26	9	8	9	36	36	0	35	
8	PTT Rayong	26	10	5	11	42	43	−1	35	
9	Chiangmai	26	8	8	10	36	34	+2	32	
10	Krabi	26	7	8	11	27	26	+1	29	
11	Lampang	27	6	10	11	39	52	−13	28	
12	Nakhon Pathom United	26	6	10	10	29	42	−13	28	
13	Rayong	26	4	12	10	24	39	−15	24	
14	Bangkok	26	4	11	11	26	41	−15	23	
15	Samut Songkhram	27	4	7	16	26	61	−35	19	
16	Khonkaen United	0	0	0	0	0	0	0	0	Club suspended, record expunged

Updated to match(es) played on 24 September 2016. Source: League Division 1
Rules for classification: 1) points; 2) goal difference; 3) number of goals scored.
(C) Champions; (P) Promoted

=== Positions by round ===
Team ╲ Round	1	2	3	4	5	6	7	8	9	10	11	12	13	14	15	16	17	18	19	20	21	22	23	24	25	26	27	28
Thai Honda	12	13	13	10	10	9	9	7	5	5	4	5	3	4	4	4	4	3	2	2	2	2	2	1	1	1		
Ubon UMT United	3	6	6	3	1	2	1	2	2	4	6	4	2	2	3	2	1	1	1	1	1	1	1	2	2	2		
Port	1	4	8	4	2	1	2	1	1	1	1	1	1	1	1	1	2	2	3	3	3	3	3	3	3	3		
Air Force Central	7	5	5	8	7	7	7	6	10	9	8	6	7	8	10	11	10	8	8	7	6	6	4	4	4	4		
Ang Thong	2	1	1	1	4	5	5	4	4	3	3	3	4	3	2	3	3	4	4	5	4	5	5	6	6	5		
Songkhla United	6	9	9	11	11	10	8	9	7	7	5	7	6	8	6	6	5	5	5	4	6	7	8	5	5	6		
Prachuap	5	3	7	5	3	4	3	5	6	8	10	9	6	7	5	5	6	6	7	6	7	7	7	7	8	7		
PTT Rayong	16	8	4	2	5	6	6	8	8	10	9	10	10	10	11	12	12	10	11	10	8	6	6	7	7	8		
Chiangmai	14	7	3	7	6	3	4	3	3	2	2	2	5	5	7	7	7	9	9	11	9	8	9	9	9	9		
Krabi	4	2	2	6	8	8	10	11	11	11	11	13	12	12	12	10	11	12	10	9	10	10	10	10	10	10		
Lampang	11	15	14	14	14	14	14	15	15	12	13	14	14	16	13	13	14	13	13	13	13	13	13	11	11	11	11	
Nakhon Pathom	8	10	10	9	9	12	12	10	9	6	7	8	9	6	8	9	9	11	12	12	12	12	12	12	12	12		
Rayong	9	12	12	13	12	11	11	12	12	14	12	12	13	15	15	16	13	14	14	14	14	14	13	13	13	13		
Bangkok	15	16	16	16	15	15	16	16	14	16	16	15	15	13	14	15	16	16	16	16	16	15	14	14	14	14		
Samut Songkhram	10	11	11	12	13	13	13	14	13	15	15	16	16	14	16	14	15	15	15	15	15	15	15	15	15	15	15	

Leader and promotion to 2017 Thai Premier League
Promotion to 2017 Thai Premier League

Updated to match(es) played on 24 September 2016. Source: Thai Division 1 League

=== Result table ===
Home \ Away	AFA	ANG	BAN	CHI	KKU	KRA	LAM	NKP	POR	PUA	PTT	RAY	SAS	SON	THA	UBO
Air Force Central		1–0	5–0			0–0	4–1	1–1	2–3	3–2	3–1	4–1	3–2	2–1	1–1	0–1
Angthong	1–1		1–1	1–1			3–1	1–0	2–0	2–2	1–3	4–2	3–0	1–0		1–0
Bangkok	0–0	0–2		0–1		1–0	2–0	1–1	2–2	0–2	3–1	0–0	2–2	0–0	1–3	0–0
Chiangmai	3–3	2–0	2–1			1–2	1–1	1–0	5–1	0–0	1–3		4–0	1–3	1–1	4–2
Khonkaen United																
Krabi	0–2	0–0	3–0	0–1			1–0	1–2	0–2	0–0	4–1	1–0	5–1	1–2	2–1	0–1
Lampang	1–1	3–2	2–2	3–2		1–1		4–1	0–3	2–0	3–1	2–0	1–1	1–1		2–2
Nakhon Pathom United		1–1	1–1	1–1		1–1	2–1		2–1	2–1	1–2	2–0	2–0		1–1	1–2
Port	2–0	3–1	1–1	3–1			3–0	6–1		1–2	3–0	2–2	6–2	2–0	0–0	3–1
Prachuap	1–0	2–4	1–3	1–0		1–1	3–1	1–0	1–1		1–3	3–0	3–0	2–2	2–5	
PTT Rayong	1–2	1–1	3–2	2–1		1–1	2–2	4–1		2–1		2–2	2–0	0–1	1–2	0–2
Rayong	1–0	2–1		0–0		2–1	0–0	2–2	2–2	1–1	2–0		1–1	1–2	0–1	0–0
Samut Songkhram	0–2	1–2		1–1		1–0	3–1	1–1	0–3	2–1	0–0	2–2		1–0	1–2	1–2
Songkhla United	0–0	2–2	3–2	2–1		1–1	4–2	5–1	1–1		0–4	1–1	3–1		0–3	1–0
Thai Honda Ladkrabang	3–3	0–1	1–0	1–0		1–0	4–2	1–1	2–1	0–0	3–2	3–0	5–1	0–0		1–1
Ubon UMT United	2–1	1–0	4–1	2–0		2–1	2–2	1–0	0–0	1–2		2–0	4–1	2–0	1–1	

Updated to match(es) played on 24 September 2016. Source: Division 1
Legend: Blue = home team win; Yellow = draw; Red = away team win.

== Season statistics ==
=== Top scorers ===
As of 24 September 2016.

Rank	Player	Club	Goals
1	(North Macedonia) Hristijan Kirovski	Prachuap	17
2	(Ivory Coast) Marc Landry Babo	Angthong	13
2	(Brazil) Willen	Songkhla United	13
2	(Brazil) Ricardo Jesus	Thai Honda Ladkrabang	13
6	(Brazil) Valdo	Air Force Central	12
6	(Thailand) Sirisak Musbu-ngor	Lampang	12
8	(Trinidad and Tobago) Darryl Roberts	Ubon UMT United	10
8	(Brazil) Rodrigo Maranhão	Port	10
8	(Brazil) Leandro	PTT Rayong (5 Goals); Air Force Central (5 Goals)	10
8	(Thailand) Apiwat Pengprakone	Chiangmai	10
8	(Japan) Yusei Ogasawara	Nakhon Pathom United	10

=== Hat-tricks ===
Player	For	Against	Result	Date
(Brazil) Barros Tardeli	Krabi	Bangkok	3–0	9 March 2016
(Ghana) Isaac Honny	Angthong	Khonkaen United	4–1	16 March 2016
(North Macedonia) Hristijan Kirovski	Prachuap	Lampang	3–1	30 March 2016
(Brazil) Rodrigo Maranhão	Port	Samut Songkhram	3–0	30 March 2016
(North Macedonia) Hristijan Kirovski	Prachuap	Samut Songkhram	3–0	22 June 2016
(Brazil) Ricardo Jesus	Thai Honda Ladkrabang	Samut Songkhram	5–1	3 July 2016
(Thailand) Yod Chanthawong	Songkhla United	Chiangmai	3–1	3 July 2016
(Spain) Rufo Sánchez	Songkhla United	Samut Songkhram	3–1	17 July 2016
(Thailand) Jongrak Pakdee	Krabi	Samut Songkhram	5–1	17 September 2016

== Attendances ==
Pos	Team	Total	High	Low	Average	Change
1	Khonkaen United	53,790	5,895	3,795	4,890	n/a^{†}
2	Chiangmai	60,024	6,880	3,167	4,287	+101.4%
3	Port	42,609	4,258	360	3,043	−24.8%
4	Air Force Central	35,694	5,015	1,592	2,549	+4.2%
5	Angthong	29,488	5,616	824	2,268	+25.7%
6	Ubon UMT United	26,559	3,128	850	1,897	n/a^{†}
7	Bangkok	27,911	2,980	939	1,860	−32.7%
8	PTT Rayong	24,421	3,436	904	1,744	−12.0%
9	Songkhla United	20,396	2,714	1,052	1,456	−12.9%
10	Lampang	19,534	2,413	710	1,395	n/a^{†}
11	Rayong	16,474	2,228	600	1,176	n/a^{†}
12	Prachuap	14,409	2,571	722	1,108	+4.5%
13	Nakhon Pathom United	12,314	1,454	506	947	−44.7%
14	Krabi	13,481	1,394	471	898	−10.7%
15	Samut Songkhram	10,387	1,292	352	741	−25.8%
16	Thai Honda Ladkrabang	8,637	2,116	29	616	−52.8%
	League total	421,049	6,880	29	2,192	+26.0%

Updated to games played on 24 September 2016
Source: Division 1
Notes:
^{†} Teams played previous season in Division 2

== See also ==
- 2016 Thai League
- 2016 Regional League Division 2
- 2016 Football Division 3
- 2016 Thai FA Cup
- 2016 Thai League Cup
- 2016 Kor Royal Cup
- Thai Premier League All-Star Football
