= 2015 Thai Division 1 League =

Thai Division 1 League
- Season: 2015
- Champions: Police United
- Promoted: Pattaya United; Sukhothai; BBCU
- Relegated: Phichit; Ayutthaya; Phuket; TTM; Trat
- Matches played: 379
- Goals scored: 1,074 (2.83 per match)
- Top goalscorer: Tana Chanabut; Felipe Ferreira (25 goals)
- Biggest home win: Police United 7–0 Trat (22 April 2015)
- Biggest away win: Trat 0–5 PTT Rayong (4 July 2015)
- Highest scoring: Phichit 6–3 Phuket (5 July 2015)
- Longest winning run: 5 games Police United
- Longest unbeaten run: 14 games Police United
- Longest winless run: 13 games Chiangmai
- Longest losing run: 8 games Trat
- Highest attendance: 7,657; Sukhothai 2–0 Thai Honda (9 December 2015)
- Lowest attendance: 0 TTM 0–1 Phuket (28 October 2015)
- Total attendance: 659,219
- Average attendance: 1,739

2015 Thai League Division 1 (known as Yamaha League-1 for sponsorship reasons) was the 18th season of the League since its establishment in 1997. It is the feeder league for the Thai Premier League. A total of 20 teams competed in the league this season.

== Changes from last season ==
=== Team changes ===
==== From Division 1 ====
Promoted to Thai Premier League

- Nakhon Ratchasima Mazda
- Saraburi
- Navy

Relegated to Regional League Division 2

- Roi Et United
- Phitsanulok
- Khonkaen
- Sriracha Ban Bueng

==== To Division 1 ====
Relegated from Thai Premier League

- Police United
- PTT Rayong
- Songkhla United
- Air Force Central
- GSE Samut Songkhram

Promoted from Regional League Division 2

- Prachuap
- Thai Honda
- Sukhothai
- Phichit

== Teams ==
=== Stadium and locations ===
Locations of the 2015 Thai Division 1 League teams
Football clubs in Bangkok Metropolitan Region

Team	Location	Stadium	Capacity	Ref.
Air Force Central	Pathum Thani	Thupatemee Stadium	25,000	
Ang Thong	Ang Thong	Ang Thong Province Stadium	6,500	
Ayutthaya	Ayutthaya	Ayutthaya Province Stadium	6,000	
Bangkok	Bangkok	Chalerm Phrakiat Bang Mod Stadium	8,000	
BBCU	Nonthaburi	Chalerm Phrakiat Nonthaburi Youth Centre Stadium	6,000	
Chiangmai	Chiangmai	700th Anniversary Stadium	25,000	
Krabi	Krabi	Krabi Province Stadium	6,000	
Nakhon Pathom United	Nakhon Pathom	Nakhon Pathom Municipality Sport School Stadium	2,141	
Pattaya United	Pattaya	Nongprue Stadium	5,000	
Phichit	Phichit	Phichit Stadium	15,000	
Phuket	Phuket	Surakul Stadium	15,000	
Police United	Pathum Thani	Boonyachinda Stadium	3,500	
Prachuap	Prachuap Khiri Khan	Sam Ao Stadium	7,000	
PTT Rayong	Rayong	PTT Stadium	20,000	
Samut Songkhram BTU	Samut Songkhram	Samut Songkhram Stadium	6,000	
Songkhla United	Songkhla	Tinsulanon Stadium	35,000	
Sukhothai	Sukhothai	Thung Thalay Luang Stadium	8,000	
Thai Honda	Bangkok	72nd Anniversary Stadium (Min Buri)	15,000	
Trat	Trat	Trat Province Stadium	4,000	
TTM Customs	Samut Prakan	Lad Krabang 54 Stadium	2,000	

=== Personnel and sponsoring ===
Note: Flags indicate national team as has been defined under FIFA eligibility rules. Players may hold more than one non-FIFA nationality.

Team	Shirt sponsor	Kit manufacturer	Captain	Head coach
Air Force Central	Central	KELA	(Thailand) Sarayuth Chaikamdee	(Thailand) Sasom Pobprasert
Ang Thong	CP	Ego Sports	(Thailand) Santat Klinyeesun	(Germany) Reiner Maurer
Ayutthaya	Gulf	Svolme	(Thailand) Sorasak Kaewinta	Vacant
Bangkok	M2F	Lotto	(Japan) Suguru Hashimoto	(Serbia) Miloš Joksić
BBCU	3BB	Ego Sports	(Thailand) Kittikun Jamsuwan	(Japan) Tsuyoshi Takano
Chiangmai	Singha	Warrix Sports	(Thailand) Jaroonsak Somkong	(Netherlands) Wil Boessen
Krabi	Thai AirAsia	Ego Sports	(Thailand) Thaweephong Ja-reanroob	(Thailand) Vorawan Chitavanich
Nakhon Pathom	Chang	Kool	(Thailand) Narentorn Rasee	(England) Jason Withe
Pattaya United	Bang & Olufsen	Warrix Sports	(Thailand) Wattana Plainum	(South Korea) Lim Jong-heon
Phichit	Red Bull	FBT	(Thailand) Amnart Rakprasert	(Thailand) Vorakorn Wichanarong
Phuket	Chang	Grand Sport	(Japan) Yusuke Sato	(Thailand) Songyod Klinsrisook
Police United	Chang	Puma	(Thailand) Surachart Sareepim	(Thailand) Totchtawan Sripan
Prachuap	Sahaviriya Group	Tamudo	(Thailand) Rangsarit Sutthisa	(Thailand) Dusit Chalermsan
PTT Rayong	PTT Group	Grand Sport	(Thailand) Narongchai Vachiraban	(Brazil) José Alves Borges
Samut Songkhram	—	Kool	(Thailand) Saknarin Phusamsai	(Thailand) Samad Amartayakul
Songkhla United	I-Mobile	FBT	(Thailand) Chairat Madsiri	(Thailand) Somchai Makmool
Sukhothai	Bangkok Airways	Mawin	(Thailand) Thanawat Panchang	(Thailand) Somchai Chuayboonchum
Thai Honda	Honda	Kappa	(Japan) Daiki Higuchi	(Japan) Masami Taki
Trat	CP	Tamudo	(Thailand) Narej Karpkraikaew	(Thailand) Praphan Narkpong
TTM	TTM	Deffo	(Thailand) Jetsada Jitsawad	(Thailand) Narasak Boonkleng

=== Foreign players ===
The number of foreign players is restricted to five per TPL team, including a slot for a player from AFC countries. A team can use four foreign players on the field in each game, including at least one player from the AFC country.

Club	Player 1	Player 2	Player 3	Player 4	Asian Player
Air Force Central	(Brazil) Valdomiro Soares	(Ghana) Isaac Honny	(Ivory Coast) Kouassi Hermann	(South Korea) Lee Hyun-jin	(Japan) Yuji Funayama
Ang Thong	(Brazil) Alex Ruela	(Brazil) Rodrigo Gonçalves	(South Korea) Ho Seong-wook	(South Korea) Jeong Su-ho	(Japan) Nobuhito Takahashi
Ayutthaya	(Brazil) Valci Júnior	(Cameroon) Njie Divine	(Japan) Seiya Kojima	(Slovakia) Jozef Tirer	(Japan) Noguchi Pinto
Bangkok F.C.	(France) Flavien Michelini	(Japan) Suguru Hashimoto	(Montenegro) Radomir Đalović	(Serbia) Ivan Petrović	(South Korea) Ahn Byeong-keun
BBCU	(Brazil) Andre Araujo	(Cameroon) Dooh Moukoko	(Japan) Yuki Bamba	(South Korea) Chae Wan-Ji	(Japan) Yusuke Kato
Chiangmai	(Brazil) Rogerio Silva	(Morocco) El Mehdi Sidqy	(Spain) Rafael Wellington	(Zimbabwe) Terrance Mandaza	
Krabi	(Ivory Coast) Koné Seydou	(Ivory Coast) Laby Kassiaty	(Namibia) Tangeni Shipahu	(Namibia) Willy Stephanus	(Japan) Ryohei Maeda
Nakhon Pathom	(Brazil) Aron da Silva	(Cameroon) Jacques Nguemaleu	(Ghana) Lesley Ablorh	(Japan) Yusei Ogasawara	(South Korea) Jeong Woo-geun
Pattaya United	(Brazil) Wellington Priori	(North Korea) Ri Kwang-chon	(Serbia) Milan Bubalo	(Spain) Borja Navarro	(South Korea) Lee Won-young
Phichit	(Cameroon) Mbengen Isaac	(Ivory Coast) Ludovic Loic	(Ivory Coast) Nenebi Tra Sylvestre	(Liberia) Melvin Kicmett	(South Korea) Joo Sung-hwan
Phuket	(Australia) Trent McClenahan	(Brazil) Andrezinho	(Cameroon) Berlin Ndebe-Nlome	(Guinea) Moussa Sylla	(Japan) Yusuke Sato
Police United	(Brazil) Diego Barcelos	(Ivory Coast) Dagno Siaka	(Japan) Sho Shimoji	(Netherlands) Adnan Barakat	(Australia) Goran Šubara
Prachuap	(Brazil) Nascimento	(Cameroon) Munze Ulrich	(Curaçao) Sendley Bito	(South Korea) Kwon Dae-hee	(Kyrgyzstan) Edgar Bernhardt
PTT Rayong	(Australia) Kyle Nix	(Brazil) Douglas	(Haiti) Yves Desmarets	(Ivory Coast) Amadou Ouattara	(South Korea) Lee Sang-Ho
Samut Songkhram	(Brazil) Barros Tardeli	(Ivory Coast) Bernard Kouassi	(Ivory Coast) Marc Landry Babo	(Madagascar) Heritiana Thierry	(South Korea) Chang Seung-Weon
Songkhla United	(Serbia) Darko Rakočević	(Spain) Sergio Suárez	(Spain) Rufo Sánchez	(Timor-Leste) Paulo Martins	(Japan) Yugo Kobayashi
Sukhothai	(Brazil) Felipe Ferreira	(Cameroon) Bouba Abbo	(Japan) Yuto Nakagawa	(Madagascar) John Baggio	(Japan) Hiromichi Katano
Thai Honda	(Argentina) Gastón González	(Cameroon) Walther Henri	(Japan) Michitaka Akimoto	(Nigeria) Julius Oiboh	(Japan) Daiki Higuchi
Trat	(Japan) Seiya Sugishita	(North Macedonia) Borče Manevski	(Nigeria) Saidu Sani	(South Korea) Na Jin-seong	(South Korea) Yoon Si-ho
TTM	(Argentina) Lucas Daniel	(Argentina) Matías Recio	(Ivory Coast) Ali Diarra	(Trinidad and Tobago) Kendall Jagdeosingh	(South Korea) Nam Dae-shik

== League table ==
Pos	Team	Pld	W	D	L	GF	GA	GD	Pts	Qualification or relegation
1	Police United	38	24	8	6	84	30	+54	80	(Note: Police United was suspended for one year.)
2	Pattaya United (P)	38	18	11	9	77	40	+37	65	Promotion to 2016 Thai Premier League
3	Sukhothai (P)	38	17	11	10	71	52	+19	62	Promotion to 2016 Thai Premier League
4	BBCU (P)	38	17	9	12	50	42	+8	60	Promotion to 2016 Thai Premier League
5	Nakhon Pathom	38	17	8	13	58	47	+11	59	
6	Thai Honda	38	16	9	13	62	46	+16	57	
7	PTT Rayong	38	14	12	12	62	60	+2	54	
8	Prachuap Khiri Khan	38	15	9	14	56	54	+2	54	
9	Air Force Central	38	14	10	14	53	50	+3	52	
10	Ang Thong	38	12	15	11	48	41	+7	51	
11	Songkhla United	38	14	9	15	53	60	−7	51	
12	Samut Songkhram	38	13	11	14	55	53	+2	50	
13	Bangkok F.C.	38	14	7	17	44	49	−5	49 (Note: BAN 0–0 KRA; KRA 1–2 BAN)	
14	Krabi	38	12	13	13	46	47	−1	49	
15	Chiangmai	38	12	12	14	43	54	−11	48 (Note: CHI 1–1 PHI; PHI 1–2 CHI)	
16	Phichit (R)	38	12	12	14	59	63	−4	48	Relegation to the 2016 Regional League Division 2
17	Ayutthaya (R)	38	12	7	19	47	71	−24	43	Relegation to the 2016 Regional League Division 2
18	Phuket (R)	38	12	7	19	38	65	−27	43	Relegation to the 2016 Regional League Division 2
19	TTM (R)	38	10	10	18	34	51	−17	40	Relegation to the 2016 Regional League Division 2
20	Trat (R)	38	7	6	25	35	100	−65	27	Relegation to the 2016 Regional League Division 2

Updated to match(es) played on 10 February 2016. Source: Thai Premier League
Rules for classification: 1) points; 2) goal difference; 3) number of goals scored.
(P) Promoted; (R) Relegated

== Results ==
Home \ Away	AFA	ANG	AYT	BAN	BBC	CHI	KRA	NKP	PAT	PHI	PHU	POL	PUA	PTT	SAS	SON	SUK	THA	TRA	TTM
Air Force Central		0–0	3–1	0–0	1–3	3–2	0–0	2–0	2–0	1–1	2–0	2–2	2–1	2–1	1–2	3–4	1–1	3–0	5–0	1–1
Ang Thong	3–1		4–1	2–1	0–0	1–1	2–1	0–0	1–0	1–0	3–0	0–1	2–3	2–2	0–0	2–2	1–2	1–4	3–0	4–0
Ayutthaya	0–2	1–2		0–2	1–3	0–2	1–1	0–0	2–1	1–2	1–0	0–0	1–0	2–1	3–1	0–0	2–6	3–1	3–0	1–0
Bangkok F.C.	1–0	1–3	0–1		2–0	0–1	0–0	2–0	2–1	1–4	1–2	1–0	0–2	1–0	2–0	3–1	1–3	2–0	5–1	1–1
BBCU	3–1	0–0	1–0	3–0		2–0	1–0	3–2	1–1	2–1	1–0	0–3	3–0	1–2	2–2	0–0	1–0	1–3	4–3	1–0
Chiangmai	0–0	1–0	0–2	1–0	0–1		2–1	2–3	0–3	1–1	1–0	1–0	2–0	1–1	3–2	2–1	2–2	1–1	2–2	0–1
Krabi	1–2	2–0	2–1	1–2	0–0	1–0		1–1	1–0	1–0	1–1	3–1	1–1	2–3	2–2	3–2	2–1	0–1	0–2	5–1
Nakhon Pathom	2–0	1–0	3–1	1–0	0–0	3–1	2–1		3–2	2–3	3–0	2–2	1–1	2–2	2–1	2–0	1–2	1–2	3–0	3–0
Pattaya United	0–0	2–2	4–1	3–1	0–0	5–0	0–0	3–0		1–1	3–1	5–1	5–3	2–0	5–1	3–1	3–0	2–1	4–2	5–0
Phichit	4–1	2–2	4–2	2–2	2–1	1–2	3–1	2–2	0–1		6–3	0–3	0–3	3–1	0–2	1–1	1–2	2–2	3–0	1–0
Phuket	1–3	0–0	2–1	2–1	1–1	2–1	1–1	1–0	2–0	1–1		0–5	0–3	1–2	2–1	1–0	3–0	3–2	0–1	0–3
Police United	1–0	4–0	4–0	1–1	3–0	3–1	2–1	3–1	1–2	2–0	1–1		3–1	6–0	1–1	6–0	5–2	1–0	7–0	1–0
Prachuap	1–1	1–0	2–2	2–0	3–2	3–3	2–3	0–3	1–1	3–4	3–0	0–1		1–1	2–1	0–2	2–0	0–1	2–0	3–2
PTT Rayong	1–0	1–0	3–3	1–1	2–1	2–2	0–1	4–2	2–2	4–1	2–1	1–2	1–1		3–1	0–1	1–1	1–1	2–0	5–2
Samut Songkhram	0–2	0–2	1–1	2–0	2–1	1–1	4–0	0–1	1–1	1–0	0–0	0–1	3–2	3–0		4–1	4–3	0–0	6–2	0–0
Songkhla United	1–0	2–2	6–2	3–2	1–0	0–1	1–1	1–3	1–1	2–0	2–1	1–1	2–0	1–3	0–1		0–2	1–0	4–1	2–0
Sukhothai	4–0	1–1	5–2	1–2	2–1	1–1	1–1	1–0	1–0	2–2	5–2	0–0	0–1	1–1	2–1	3–1		2–0	7–1	0–1
Thai Honda	3–1	1–1	2–1	2–0	3–2	2–2	2–2	2–1	2–0	5–0	4–0	1–2	1–2	3–0	1–1	2–3	1–2		5–1	0–0
Trat	3–2	2–1	1–2	1–1	0–2	1–0	1–2	2–1	0–4	1–1	0–1	1–4	0–0	0–5	1–2	3–1	2–2	0–1		0–0
TTM F.C.	2–3	0–0	0–1	1–2	1–2	2–0	1–0	0–1	2–2	0–0	0–2	1–0	0–1	3–1	3–1	1–1	1–1	1–0	3–0	

Updated to match(es) played on 10 February 2016. Source: Thai Premier League
Legend: Blue = home team win; Yellow = draw; Red = away team win.

== Season statistics ==
=== Top scorers ===
As of 12 December 2015.

Rank	Player	Club	Goals
1	(Thailand) Tana Chanabut	Police United	25
1	(Brazil) Felipe Ferreira	Sukhothai	25
3	(Brazil) Valci Júnior	Ayutthaya	24
4	(South Korea) Jeong Woo-geun	Nakhon Pathom	20
4	(Serbia) Milan Bubalo	Pattaya United	20
6	(Ivory Coast) Marc Landry Babo	Samut Songkhram	18
7	(Argentina) Gastón González	Thai Honda	17
8	(Thailand) Surachat Sareepim	Police United	16
9	(Montenegro) Radomir Đalović	Bangkok	15
9	(Spain) Rufo Sánchez	Songkhla United	15
9	(Nigeria) Julius Oiboh	Air Force Central (8 Goals); Thai Honda (7 Goals)	15

== Hat-tricks ==
Player	For	Against	Result	Date
(Brazil) Alex Ruela	Ang Thong	TTM	4–0	28 February 2015
(Spain) Rufo Sánchez	Songkhla United	Ayutthaya	6–2	4 April 2015
(Serbia) Milan Bubalo	Pattaya United	Chiangmai	5–0	8 April 2015
(Thailand) Tana Chanabut	Police United	BBCU	3–0	26 April 2015
(Thailand) Tana Chanabut^{4}	Police United	Sukhothai	5–2	29 April 2015
(Ivory Coast) Marc Landry Babo	Samut Songkhram	Songkhla United	4–1	3 May 2015
(Afghanistan) Faysal Shayesteh	Songkhla United	Trat	4–1	6 May 2015
(Serbia) Rodoljub Paunović	Thai Honda	Phichit	5–0	9 May 2015
(Brazil) Erivaldo Oliveira	Prachuap	TTM	3–2	27 June 2015
(Brazil) Felipe Ferreira	Sukhothai	Trat	7–1	28 June 2015
(Thailand) Yod Chanthawong	Sukhothai	Trat	7–1	28 June 2015
(Thailand) Chayawat Srinawong	PTT Rayong	Trat	5–0	4 July 2015
(Ivory Coast) Marc Landry Babo	Samut Songkhram	Sukhothai	4–3	12 July 2015
(Serbia) Rodoljub Paunović	Thai Honda	Trat	5–1	12 July 2015
(Thailand) Alongkorn Jornnathong	Thai Honda	Air Force Central	3–1	8 August 2015
(Thailand) Surachat Sareepim^{4}	Police United	Songkhla United	6–0	23 August 2015
(Brazil) Valci Júnior	Ayutthaya	Trat	3–0	23 August 2015
(South Korea) Lee Won-young	Pattaya United	Prachuap	5–3	13 September 2015
(Curaçao) Sendley Bito	Prachuap	Phuket	3–0	27 September 2015
(Thailand) Teeratep Winothai	Police United	PTT Rayong	6–0	17 October 2015
(Brazil) Aron da Silva	Nakhon Pathom	Trat	3–0	18 October 2015
(Spain) Borja Navarro	Pattaya United	Ayutthaya	4–1	25 October 2015
(South Korea) Joo Sung-hwan	Phichit	Air Force Central	4–1	22 November 2015

== Attendances ==
Pos	Team	Total	High	Low	Average	Change
1	Sukhothai	70,400	7,657	1,674	3,911	n/a^{†}
2	Bangkok	52,515	3,831	1,829	2,763	n/a
3	Air Force Central	46,480	3,452	1,037	2,446	n/a
4	Pattaya United	44,358	4,352	1,176	2,334	n/a
5	Chiangmai	40,454	4,520	1,215	2,129	n/a
6	Phichit	38,921	3,650	800	2,048	n/a^{†}
7	Phuket	38,629	4,120	640	2,033	n/a
8	Ayutthaya	37,758	3,125	623	1,987	n/a
9	PTT Rayong	37,669	4,902	597	1,982	n/a
10	Ang Thong	34,299	5,248	1,018	1,805	n/a
11	Nakhon Pathom	32,540	2,562	832	1,712	n/a
12	Songkhla United	31,757	3,125	1,039	1,671	n/a
13	Thai Honda	24,809	3,540	584	1,305	n/a^{†}
14	Prachuap	20,152	1,960	589	1,060	n/a^{†}
15	Krabi	19,118	1,483	538	1,006	n/a
16	Samut Songkhram	18,974	2,682	385	998	n/a
17	Police United	18,701	1,588	550	984	n/a
18	BBCU	18,153	1,314	493	955	n/a
19	Trat	17,941	1,897	350	944	n/a
20	TTM	9,710	1,150	0	511	n/a
	League total	659,219	7,657	0	1,739	n/a

Updated to games played on 12 December 2015
Source: Thai Premier League
Notes:
^{†} Teams played previous season in Division 2

== See also ==
- 2015 Thai Premier League
- 2015 Regional League Division 2
- 2015 Thai FA Cup
- 2015 Thai League Cup
- 2015 Kor Royal Cup
- Thai Premier League All-Star Football
