= Borja Navarro =

Borja Navarro may refer to:

- Borja Navarro (footballer, born 1988) (Borja Navarro Landáburu), Spanish football defender
- Borja Navarro (footballer, born 1990) (Borja Navarro García), Spanish football forward
