= Somwang =

Somwang may refer to:

Somwang as a given name:

- Somwang Patamakanthin
- Murder of Somwang Yapapha
- Somwang Prompim, a woman who died on Cathay Pacific Flight 700Z and was a potential target of insurance fraud

Somwang as a family name:

- Nikom Somwang
