= Felipe Ferreira =

Felipe Ferreira may refer to:

- Felipe Ferreira (footballer, born 1988), Brazilian retired football midfielder
- Felipe Ferreira (footballer, born 1994), Brazilian football midfielder for Botafogo
