= Sirisak Yodyardthai =

Thai football manager (born 1969)

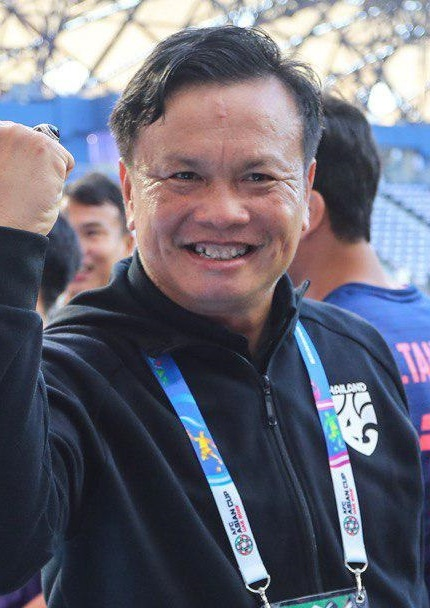
- Yodyardthai with Thailand in 2019

Personal information
- Full name: Sirisak Yodyardthai
- Date of birth: 29 March 1969 (age 57)
- Place of birth: Phayakkhaphum Phisai, Maha Sarakham, Thailand
- Height: 1.76 m (5 ft 9 1/2 in)
- Position: Winger

Senior career*
Years	Team	Apps	(Gls)
1988–1997	Osotspa		

International career
- Thailand

Managerial career
- 1998–2015: Osotspa (academy)
- 2015–2017: Thai Honda
- 2017–2019: Thailand (assistant)
- 2019: Thailand (caretaker)
- 2019: Ubon United
- 2020: Khon Kaen
- 2021: Udon Thani
- 2021–2022: Pattaya Dolphins United
- 2022–2024: Debsirin School
- 2024: Nakhon Pathom United
- 2024: Nakhon Pathom United (techinical director)
- 2025–2026: Chiangrai United
- 2026: Thailand U17
- 2026: Rasisalai United
- * Club domestic league appearances and goals

Sirisak Yodyardthai (Thai: ศิริศักดิ์ ยอดญาติไทย) is a Thai professional football manager who was most recently the head coach of Thai League 1 club Rasisalai United.

== Early life ==
When he was 15, Sirisak was given the chance to play with his football idol, which made him want to pursue a football career. Besides playing football, he also enjoyed running in torrid weather with his brother.

== Career ==
Under his tutelage, Thai Honda were promoted to the Thai League 1 for the 2017 season. The Bangkok University graduate believes that players should not undertake vigorous physical activity before a game as it will exhaust rather than energize the player.

He led his team to their first top-flight victory in 10 years when they beat Bangkok United 1–0.

Before he became coach of Thai Honda, he did multiple jobs for them including carrying their equipment, preparing food and even being a van driver for the club. Also, he has been an assistant coach for 17 years. In 2016, he replaced Takami Masami as coach.

His sacking as coach was announced in April 2017 after a 3–1 defeat to Chonburi. with 3 wins and 8 losses.

== Managerial statistics ==
As of match played 17 October 2026

Managerial record by team and tenure
Team	From	To	Record					Ref.
Team	From	To	P	W	D	L	Win %	Ref.
Thai Honda Ladkrabang	1 January 2016	29 April 2017	11	3	0	8	27.3	
Thailand (caretaker)	7 January 2019	14 June 2019	7	2	1	4	28.6	
Ubon United	28 September 2019	30 November 2019	3	1	0	2	33.3	
Khon Kaen	1 January 2020	6 March 2020	4	0	2	2	0.0	
Udon Thani	12 February 2021	31 March 2021	14	5	3	6	35.7	
Pattaya Dolphins United	1 November 2021	4 August 2022	6	4	0	2	66.7	
Nakhon Pathom United	11 September 2024	15 November 2024	8	1	2	5	12.5	
Chiangrai United	22 August 2025	30 June 2026	34	12	13	9	35.3	
Thailand U17 (caretaker)	1 April 2026	18 April 2026	3	1	0	2	33.3	
Rasisalai United	12 July 2026	17 October 2026	5	0	1	4	0.0	
Total			95	29	22	44	30.5	

== Honours ==
Thai Honda FC

- Thai Division 1 League: 2016

== Awards ==
For his efforts in taking Thai Honda FC to the Thai League 1 in 2016, he received an award for the best professional sports coach.

== Personal life ==
Sirisak has a brother and a sister. Now, he has two sons.
