= Mariano Berriex =

Argentine-Croatian footballer

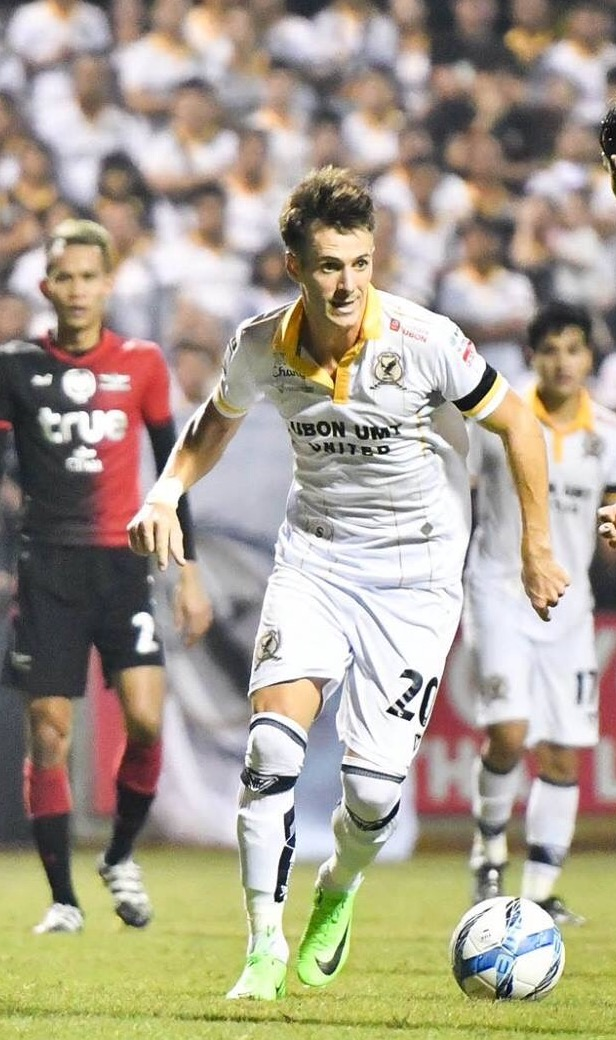

Personal information
- Full name: Mariano Berriex
- Date of birth: 29 April 1989 (age 37)
- Place of birth: Quilmes, Argentina
- Height: 1.79 m (5 ft 10 1/2 in)
- Position: Winger

Team information
- Current team: Real Potosí
- Number: 27

Senior career*
Years	Team	Apps	(Gls)
2009–2010	Independiente	0	(0)
2010	→ Ñublense (loan)	16	(1)
2011–2012	Deportes Concepción	39	(6)
2012–2013	Unión Temuco	44	(5)
2013–2014	Deportes Temuco	20	(3)
2014–2015	Alimos	19	(4)
2015–2016	Rangers	18	(1)
2016	Aris Limassol	5	(0)
2017	Ubon UMT United	16	(3)
2017	Sisaket	16	(4)
2018	PS TIRA	16	(1)
2019–	Real Potosí	12	(3)
- * Club domestic league appearances and goals as of 20:01, 22 July 2018 (UTC)

Mariano Berriex (born April 29, 1989, in Quilmes, Argentina) is an Argentine and Croatian professional footballer who currently plays as a winger for Club Real Potosí in Bolivia.
