= Watchara Mahawong =

Thai footballer (born 1983)

Personal information
- Full name: Watchara Mahawong
- Date of birth: 28 November 1983 (age 42)
- Place of birth: Nakhon Phanom, Thailand
- Height: 1.70 m (5 ft 7 in)
- Position: Full back

Senior career*
Years	Team	Apps	(Gls)
2008–2009	PEA	17	(1)
2010–2012	TTM Chiangmai	38	(6)
2010	→ Chanthaburi (loan)	10	(4)
2013	Songkhla United	12	(0)
2013	Pattaya United	9	(0)
2014	Singhtarua	26	(1)
2015	Nakhon Ratchasima	9	(0)
2015–2019	Thai Honda	42	(3)
2020–	Muangnont Bankunmae	0	(0)
- * Club domestic league appearances and goals as of 29 August 2011

Watchara Mahawong (Thai: วัชระ มหาวงศ์, born November 28, 1983) is a Thai professional footballer.

== Honours ==
=== Club ===
PEA

- Thailand Premier League Champions (1) : 2008

Thai Honda FC

Thai Division 1 League Champion; 2016
