= Kenta Yamazaki =

Japanese footballer (born 1987)

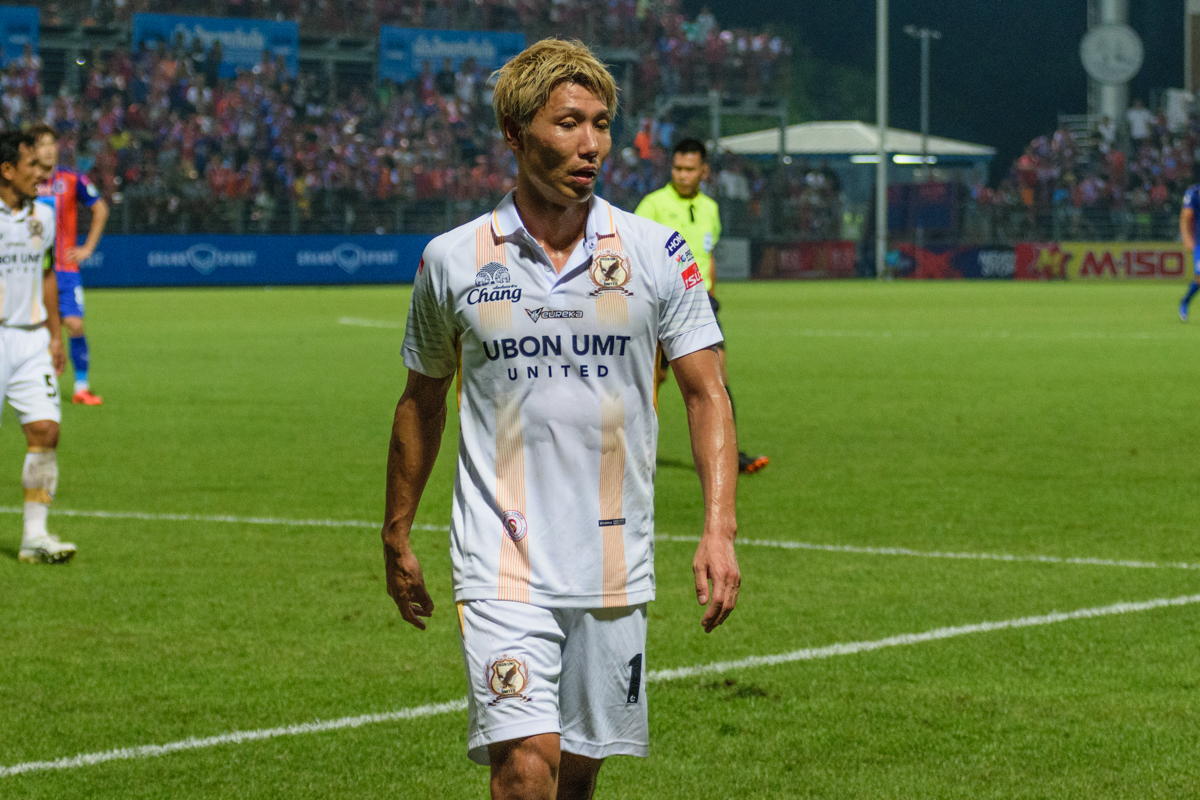

Personal information
- Full name: Kenta Yamazaki
- Date of birth: May 19, 1987 (age 39)
- Place of birth: Adachi, Tokyo, Japan
- Height: 1.74 m (5 ft 9 in)
- Position: Midfielder

Senior career*
Years	Team	Apps	(Gls)
2012	Tokyo 23 FC		
2013	TTM Customs		
2013–2014	Berane	2	(0)
2014–2015	OFK Grbalj	32	(1)
2015–2018	Ubon UMT United	89	(9)
2019–2021	Boeung Ket	0	(0)
- * Club domestic league appearances and goals

Kenta Yamazaki (Japanese: 山崎健太, born May 19, 1987) is a Japanese professional footballer.

In summer 2014, Yamazaki transferred from FK Berane, having played with them in the 2013–14 Montenegrin Second League, to OFK Grbalj, playing with them in the 2014–15 Montenegrin First League.

== Clubs ==
Youth

Year	Club
	Komazawa University

Senior

Year	Club	League
2012	Tokyo 23 FC	Kantō Soccer League
2013	TTM Customs F.C.	Thai Division 1 League
2013-2014	FK Berane	Montenegrin Second League
2014-2015	OFK Grbalj	Montenegrin First League
2015	Ubon UMT United	Regional League Division 2
2016	Ubon UMT United	Thai Division 1 League

== Honor ==
=== Ubon UMT United ===
- Regional League Division 2:
  - Winners : 2015
- Regional League North-East Division
  - Runner-up : 2015
