= Murder of Somwang Yapapha =

1995 murder of a Thai worker at a flatted factory in Singapore

Somwang Yapapha
- Born: Somwang Yapapha c. 1960; Thailand
- Died: 15 February 1995 (aged 35) or 16 February 1995 (aged 35); Defu Lane, Hougang, Singapore
- Cause of death: Fatal skull fractures
- Occupation: Construction worker
- Known for: Murder victim

On 16 February 1995, 35-year-old Thai worker Somwang Yapapha was battered to death by two of his compatriots during a drinking session at a Defu Lane flatted factory in Singapore. His murderers - Khampun Sriyotha and Samlee Prathumtree - were arrested soon after they killed Somwang, and they were charged with murder. Despite their differing accounts of the murder, Khampun and Samlee both put up a defence that there was a fight between them all while they were drinking, which caused the two defendants to bludgeon Somwang to death during the fight itself. However, the High Court rejected their defence, and the pair were hence found guilty of murdering Somwang and sentenced to death in November 1995. Both Samlee and Khampun lost their appeals, and they were jointly hanged on 4 July 1997.

== Murder and investigations ==
On 16 February 1995, the police received a report that a 35-year-old Thai construction worker died at a flatted factory in Defu Lane, Singapore.

The deceased Thai national, identified as 35-year-old Somwang Yapapha, was found with severe head injuries while he laid in a pool of blood, and his jaw was also smashed while his face and body were found with cuts caused by pieces of broken glass (some of which were embedded in the multiple open wounds). Shattered glass shards from a broken beer bottle were found scattered around the floor where Somwang's corpse was laid. On that same day, a 45-year-old Thai construction worker surrendered himself after he admitted to his employer that he was responsible for the murder, and the police report was thus made and the officers subsequently took him in for further probe and investigations. The police uncovered through first-stage investigations that the homicide likely happened between the suspect and the victim during a drunken argument while they were drinking heavily.

A forensic pathologist later examined Somwang's body, and it was found that there were not less than 20 injuries all over his body, and most of these injuries were concentrated on the neck and head. Among these injuries were four skull fractures, and two of them were sufficient in the ordinary course of nature to cause death. The injuries, according to the pathologist, were caused by a heavy object and there were no defensive injuries found on the victim. It was confirmed through police investigations that a sledgehammer was used to kill Somwang.

Altogether, after some investigations, the police arrested two Thai construction workers, including the 45-year-old man who surrendered, for the murder of Somwang. The two men, 45-year-old Samlee Prathumtree and 32-year-old Khampun Sriyotha, were charged in court with murder and subsequently remanded without bail while awaiting trial for murder.

== Murder trial and sentencing ==
On 17 August 1995, both Khampun Sriyotha and Samlee Prathumtree officially claimed trial for the murder of Somwang Yapapha. The trial, which took place at the High Court, was presided over by the late Justice T S Sinnathuray, a veteran Supreme Court judge who was notable for sentencing infamous child killer Adrian Lim to death for murdering two children in 1981, as well as British serial killer John Martin Scripps for killing and dismembering a South African tourist in 1995. Khampun was represented by James Bahadur Masih and Christopher Teh, while Samlee was represented by Low Tiang Hock and N K Rajarh, and the prosecution was led by Luke Tan Loke Yong and Wong Keen Onn.

The trial court was told that prior to the lethal sledgehammer attack, Samlee and Somwang did not have a good relationship with each other despite being neighbours back in Thailand. Samlee earlier told police that Somwang was previously incarcerated for a sexual crime, and he also engaged in petty offences like stealing cars. Somwang also proclaimed himself to be a hired professional killer who had killed many people for a living, and Somwang, who first came to Singapore in January 1995, about ten months later than Samlee (who first arrived in February 1994), often borrowed money from Samlee for gambling and alcohol. It was adduced from the men's statements that on 14 February 1995 (two days before the murder), Samlee had been threatened by a drunken Somwang with a hammer during a regular drinks session that he would be killed and have his body burnt, and although Somwang later apologized once he became sober, he continued to glare at him for the following day while at work. It was the prosecution's case that due to their interpersonal conflicts, Samlee intended to kill Somwang and Khampun, who was Samlee's close friend and employed at a neighbouring construction site, joined in the plot out of sympathy for Samlee and thus, it culminated into the murder of Somwang sometime between 9.30pm on 15 February and 1.30am on 16 February 1994.

In his defence, Samlee did not dispute the events that happened before the murder, but Samlee denied there was any intention or plan to kill Somwang. He said that on the same night when Somwang was killed, the two accused and the victim drank together, and in midst of their second session, an argument broke out between Khampun and Somwang, and it escalated into a fight between both Somwang and Khampun, who was hit with a beer bottle by Somwang. In retaliation, Khampun used a sledgehammer to batter Somwang, and Samlee thus escaped and went into hiding out of fear. Samlee, who pinpointed Khampun as the one who killed Somwang, admitted that after the end of the fight, he came out of his hiding place and saw Somwang lying face downwards on the floor motionless, and to confirm if Somwang had died, Samlee picked up the bloodstained sledgehammer and tapped once at the head of Somwang, in addition to a hard blow on the head as he recalled the death threat which Samlee spewed at him.

As for Khampun, his own version of events was that after they invited Somwang to have drinks, Somwang got aggressive with Samlee and argued with him, and Khampun also tried to restore peace between the two men, and yet the situation was aggravated further when Somwang hit him with a bottle, and Khampun thus used a clawhammer to bludgeon Somwang on the head, neck and jaw before he fled the scene, and the fight between Somwang and both the defendants ended with Somwang's death. Khampun also denied that he heard anything from Samlee about his interpersonal conflicts with Somwang. Despite the differing accounts from both men, the similarity in both version of events recounted by Samlee and Khampun was that the death of Somwang was unfortunately the result of a sudden but violent drunken brawl and there was no intent to commit murder in the first place, which formed the main crux of their defence in court.

On 28 November 1995, Justice T S Sinnathuray delivered his verdict. In his judgement, Justice Sinnathuray found that both Samlee and Khampun had the clear intention to cause the death of Somwang, especially Samlee who had the motive to commit the murder itself and thus roped his younger friend and confidant Khampun in the killing, and rejected the duo's defences in favour of the prosecution's submission. Justice Sinnathuray added that there was sufficient evidence to show that both Samlee and Khampun methodically lured Somwang to his death by inviting him for drinks, and attacked him after they started an argument on purpose, and thereafter used the sledgehammer to batter Somwang to death. The judge also noted that Samlee took steps to cover up the murder as one caused by a fight and he clearly did not tap but smashed the sledgehammer onto Somwang's head, and he also determined that both Khampun and Samlee had each took turns to hammer Somwang at least once, and the injuries which they intentionally inflicted on Somwang were sufficient in the ordinary course of nature to cause death, and these were also done in furtherance of their common intention to launch the concerted attack that ultimately took Somwang's life. On these grounds, Justice Sinnathuray concluded that the pair were ought to be convicted of the charges preferred against them for unlawfully causing Somwang's death.

As a result, both Samlee Prathumtree and Khampun Sriyotha, then aged 45 and 32 respectively, were found guilty of murder and sentenced to death by hanging. Prior to 2013, all four degrees of murder carried the mandatory death penalty in accordance to Section 302 of the Penal Code upon the conviction of an offender for murder.

== Appeal process ==
On 21 August 1996, the Court of Appeal dismissed the two men's appeals and confirmed their death sentences. The three appellate judges - Justice M Karthigesu, Justice Thean Lip Ping (L P Thean) and Justice Goh Joon Seng - found that both Khampun and Samlee had shared the common intention to cause grievous hurt to Somwang, which in turn had resulted in the murder of Somwang, and the evidence proved that both men had the premeditation and planning to lure Somwang out with an excuse of inviting him for drinks and later killed him. Justice Karthigesu, who delivered the judgement, cited the forensic findings that the victim died from two fatal skull fractures (either one alone would have also caused death), which were caused by the ruthless and intentional assault caused by the two appellants, who both did so in furtherance of the common intention to cause harm and even the death of Somwang. In turn, Justice Karthigesu pronounced that the two appellants' respective defences should be rejected in view of the evidence that were enough to convict them of murder. Hence, the Court of Appeal affirmed the death penalty and murder conviction of both Samlee and Khampun, leading to the two men failing to escape the gallows.

== Double execution ==
On the Friday morning of 4 July 1997, 34-year-old Khampun Sriyotha and 47-year-old Samlee Prathumtree were both hanged in Changi Prison for murdering Somwang Yapapha two years prior.

During that same morning, three more drug traffickers were hanged in the same prison alongside both Samlee and Khampun. Two of them, Singaporeans Abdul Rahman Yusof and La Abuhari La Odd Hamid, were convicted and sent to death row for to the joint trafficking of more than 590g of marijuana in August 1995, while the third, Singaporean Low Theng Gee (also spelt Low Theng Ghee), was found guilty of smuggling more than 31g of diamorphine in January 1996; in an unrelated case, Low notoriously masterminded the kidnapping of two police officers during that same year. Low was not tried for this abduction case since he was already on death row for drug trafficking, but his accomplice and convicted robber Abdul Nasir Amer Hamsah was alone found guilty of the kidnapping and given both caning and a life sentence on top of the 18 years he got for the other crime of robbing a Japanese woman (who died during the robbery bid).

Khampun and Samlee were one of the three Thais reported to be executed in Singapore during the year of 1997. Six months before their double executions, 30-year-old Thai citizen Pracha Thanomnin was hanged on 10 January 1997 for robbing and murdering a 47-year-old taxi driver Lee Kok Yin with three other Thais, two of whom remains at large till today and a third was convicted of attempted robbery and jailed for five years. Coupled with the executions of 11 drug traffickers and an infamous gunman Lim Chwee Soon, a total of 15 people were put to death in Singapore during the year of 1997.

== See also ==
- Capital punishment in Singapore
