= Denis Silva (footballer, born 1986) =

Brazilian footballer

Personal information
- Full name: Denis Viana da Silva
- Date of birth: 3 September 1986 (age 40)
- Place of birth: Cubatão, São Paulo, Brazil
- Height: 1.87 m (6 ft 2 in)
- Position: Defender

Senior career*
Years	Team	Apps	(Gls)
2004–2006	São Vicente	?	(?)
2008	Itapajé FC	?	(?)
2008	Jaboticabal	?	(?)
2008	Paraná	?	(?)
2009	Vitoria do Mar FC	?	(?)
2009	Mogi Mirim EC	?	(?)
2010	Morrinhos	?	(?)
2010	XV de Piracicaba	?	(?)
2010	Mogi Mirim EC	?	(?)
2010–2013	Bylis Ballsh	19	(0)
2010	→ KF Skënderbeu Korçë (loan)	3	(0)
2013–2014	KS Kastrioti	15	(1)
2015–2016	AFC United	25	(0)
2017	Sisaket	22	(1)
2018	Syrianska	27	(0)
- * Club domestic league appearances and goals as of 17 October 2018

Denis Viana da Silva (born 3 September 1986 in Cubatão, São Paulo), or more commonly Denis Silva, is a Brazilian footballer who most recently played for Syrianska FC as a defender.
