= Lee Keon-Pil =

South Korean footballer

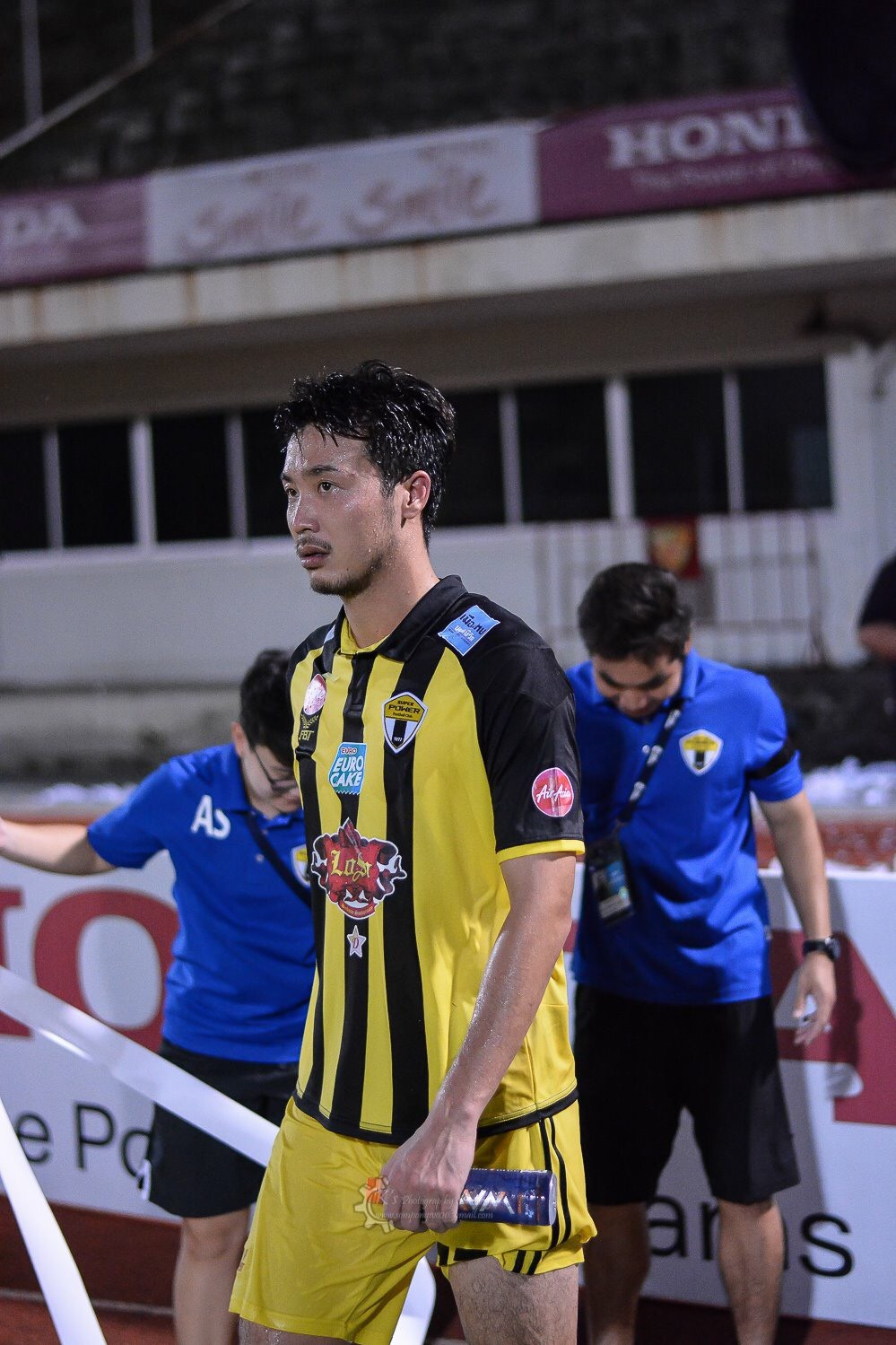

Personal information
- Full name: Lee Keon-Pil
- Date of birth: 22 July 1985 (age 41)
- Place of birth: South Korea
- Height: 1.83 m (6 ft 0 in)
- Positions: Midfielder; defender

Youth career
- 2008: Woosuk University

Senior career*
Years	Team	Apps	(Gls)
2008–2009	Busan TC	44	(2)
2011–2012	Gyeongju KHNP	23	(1)
2013–2015	Busan TC	57	(0)
2017	Super Power Samut Prakan	25	(1)
- * Club domestic league appearances and goals

Lee Keon-Pil (Korean: 이건필; born 22 July 1985) is a South Korean footballer. His previous clubs were Busan Transportation Corporation F.C. and Gyeongju Korea Hydro & Nuclear Power F.C.
