= UMT Stadium =

Football stadium in Thailand

Ubon UMT Stadium
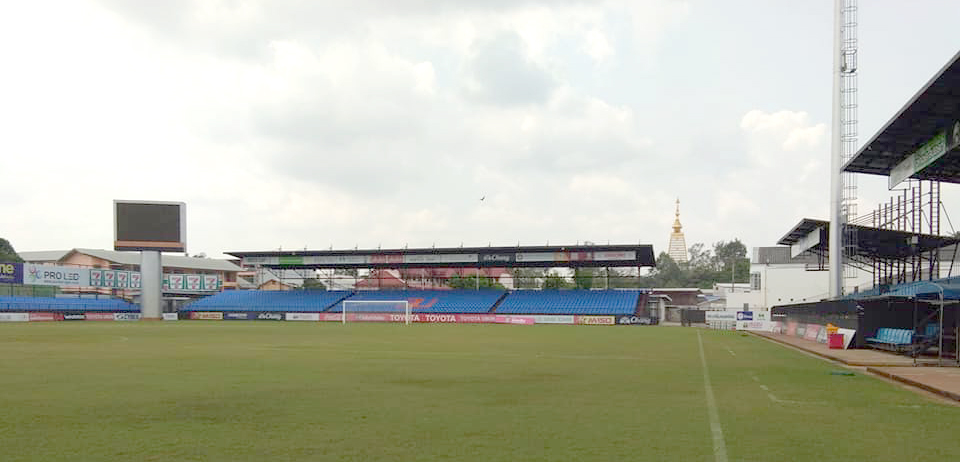
- Interactive map of Ubon UMT Stadium
- Full name: Ubon UMT Stadium
- Location: Nai Mueang, Mueang Ubon Ratchathani, Ubon Ratchathani, Thailand
- Coordinates: 15.263592°N 104.842982°E
- Owner: The Eastern University of Management and Technology
- Operator: The Eastern University of Management and Technology
- Capacity: 6,000
- Surface: Grass

Construction
- Built: 2016
- Opened: 4 February 2017

Tenant
- Ubon United

Ubon UMT Stadium (Thai: สนามยูเอ็มที สเตเดี้ยม) is a football stadium in Ubon Ratchathani, Thailand. The stadium was the home stadium of Ubon UMT United F.C. of Thai League 1 starting from 2017. The stadium has located in The Eastern University of Management and Technology (UMT) where it gains the name. It holds 6,000 people in the first phase and could be expanded later to 10,000.
