= Borja Navarro (footballer, born 1988) =

Spanish footballer

Personal information
- Full name: Borja Navarro Landáburu
- Date of birth: 13 May 1988 (age 38)
- Place of birth: Puçol, Spain
- Height: 1.80 m (5 ft 11 in)
- Position: Centre back

Youth career
- Valencia

Senior career*
Years	Team	Apps	(Gls)
2007–2009	Puçol	27	(0)
2009–2011	Valencia Mestalla	64	(1)
2011–2014	Betis B	54	(1)
2014	Săgeata Năvodari	5	(0)
2015–2020	Peña Deportiva	125	(3)
- * Club domestic league appearances and goals as of 1 March 2020

Borja Navarro Landáburu (born 13 May 1988) is a Spanish footballer who plays as a central defender.

== Club career ==
Born in Puçol, Valencia, Navarro graduated with Valencia CF's youth setup, but made his senior debuts with neighbouring UD Puçol in Tercera División. On 29 January 2009 he returned to the Che, being assigned to the B-team in Segunda División B. Despite being a regular starter, he suffered relegation during the 2009–10 season.

On 28 July 2011 Navarro joined another reserve team, Real Betis B, also in the third division; he also experienced another relegation with the Andalusians in 2013, and moved abroad in January 2014, joining Romanian Liga I side AFC Săgeata Năvodari.
