= Nikom Somwang =

Thai footballer (born 1983)

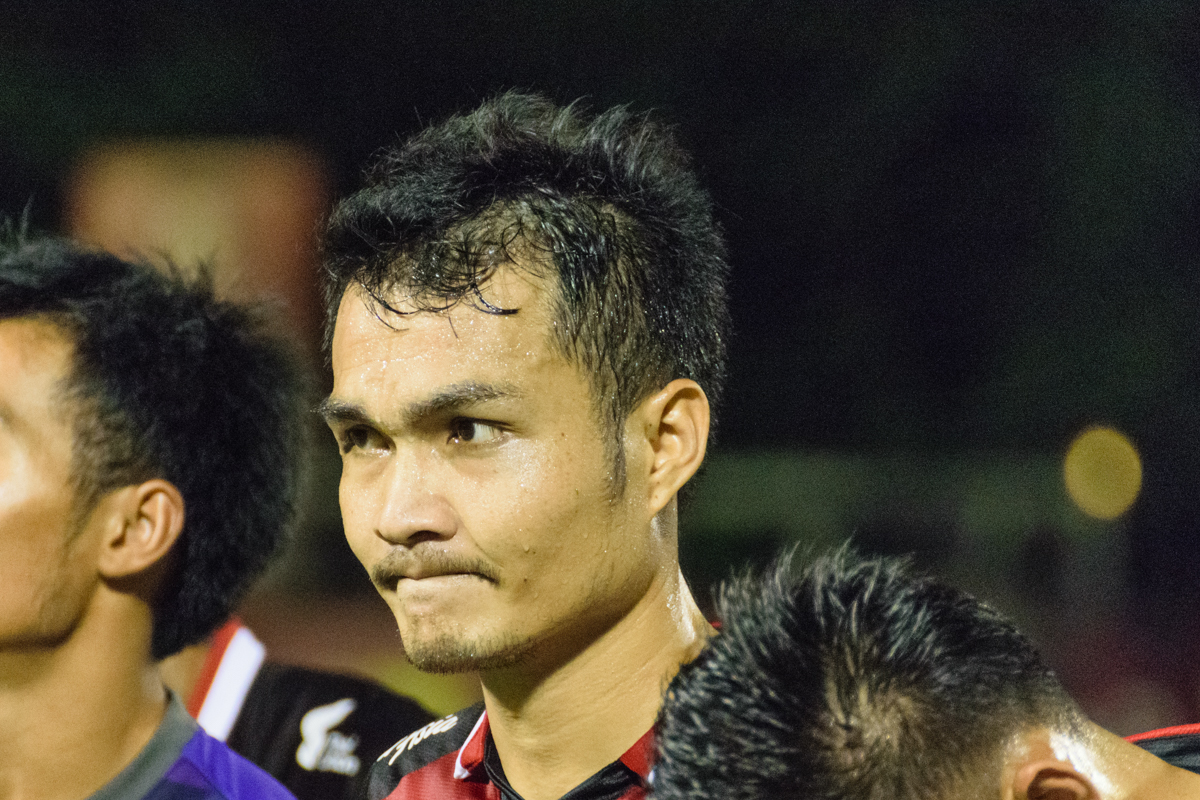

Personal information
- Full name: Nikom Somwang
- Date of birth: 18 August 1983 (age 43)
- Place of birth: Roi Et, Thailand
- Height: 1.75 m (5 ft 9 in)
- Position: Defender

Senior career*
Years	Team	Apps	(Gls)
2008	Globlex		
2009	Samut Prakan		
2010	Nonthaburi		
2011	Chiangmai		
2012	Nakhon Ratchasima		
2013–2014	Roi Et United		
2015–2017	Ubon UMT United	45	(3)
2018–2019	Police Tero	13	(0)
- * Club domestic league appearances and goals

Nikom Somwang (Thai: นิคม สมหวัง; born August 18, 1983), simply known as Aung (Thai: อั้ง), is a Thai professional footballer.

== Honours ==
Ubon UMT United

- Regional League Division 2
  - Winner : 2015
- Regional League North-East Division
  - Runner-up : 2015
