= Ari Football =

Thai company which sells football equipment

- Company type: Privately held company
- Industry: Sports equipment
- Founded: 2009; 17 years ago
- Headquarters: Bangkok, Thailand
- Area served: Thailand
- Products: Football equipment Shoes; Clothes

Ari Football or Ari is a Thai company which sells football equipment. It is known for its lifestyle focus, catering to enthusiasts, with over ten branches in Bangkok and elsewhere, as of 2016. The company was founded in 2009 by a group of friends with a passion for the sport. It started as a retail store, and later expanded to manufacturing custom items, supplying kits for Bangkok United beginning in 2014.

== Sponsorships ==
=== Football ===
==== Club teams ====
===== Asia =====
- (Thailand) Bangkok United
