= EUMT F.C. =

Thai football club

The Eastern University of Management and Technology มหาวิทยาลัยการจัดการและเทคโนโลยีอีสเทิร์น
- Full name: The Eastern University of Management and Technology Football Club สโมสรฟุตบอลมหาวิทยาลัยการจัดการและเทคโนโลยีอีสเทิร์น
- Nicknames: Ubon Eastern (อุบล อีสเทิร์น)
- Short name: EUMT
- Founded: 2015; 11 years ago as Ubon UMT United Football Club; 2018; 8 years ago as Ubon United Football Club; 2025; 1 year ago as The Eastern University of Management and Technology Football Club
- Ground: UMT Stadium; Ubon Ratchathani, Thailand
- Capacity: 6,000
- Owner(s): The Eastern University of Management and Technology
- Chairman: Wirasak Jinarat
- League: Thai League 3
- 2025–26: Thai League 3, 4th of 12 in the Northeastern region
Home colours	Away colours	Third colours

The Eastern University of Management and Technology Football Club (Thai: สโมสรฟุตบอลมหาวิทยาลัยการจัดการและเทคโนโลยีอีสเทิร์น), commonly known as EUMT F.C. or Ubon Eastern F.C., is a professional football club based in Ubon Ratchathani, Thailand. The club currently competes in the Thai League 3, the third tier of the Thai football league system, and plays in the Northeastern region.

The club represents the Eastern University of Management and Technology (EUMT). It was originally founded as Ubon UMT United Football Club, and later renamed Ubon United in 2018. The team was inactive during the 2019 season before being revived in 2025 under its current name, The Eastern University of Management and Technology F.C. (EUMT F.C.).

== History ==
In 2015, Assistant Professor Dr. Wirasak Jinarat, Chancellor of the Eastern University of Management and Technology (UMT), filed a request with the Football Association of Thailand to establish a new football club by separating from Ubon UMT F.C. The new club began competing in the Regional League Division 2 Northeast Zone in the 2015 season.

In 2016, the club won the Thai Division 1 League and earned promotion to the Thai League 1 for the first time in its history. A new stadium, the UMT Stadium, was constructed on the university campus and officially opened for the 2017 season.

At the end of 2018, the club changed its name and logo to Ubon United. However, it was dissolved at the end of the 2019 season after failing to pass the club licensing requirements due to wage-related issues.

In 2025, the team was revived under its new name, The Eastern University of Management and Technology F.C. (EUMT F.C.), and re-entered competition in the 2025 Thailand Semi-pro League, the fourth tier of Thai football. The club finished second in the Northeastern region. Although the position did not normally grant promotion, EUMT F.C. was promoted to the 2025–26 Thai League 3 Northeastern Region to fill the vacancy created by Rasisalai United's promotion to the 2025–26 Thai League 2.

== Stadium and locations ==
Coordinates	Location	Stadium	Capacity	Year
15°18′17″N 104°47′02″E	Ubon Rachathani	Tung Burapha Stadium	8,500	2015–2016
15°15′49″N 104°50′35″E	Ubon Rachathani	UMT Stadium	8,500	2017–2019

== Season By Season record ==
Season	League									FA Cup	League Cup	T3 Cup	Top goalscorer	
Season	Division	P	W	D	L	F	A	Pts	Pos	FA Cup	League Cup	T3 Cup	Name	Goals
2015	DIV 2 North-East	34	26	3	5	87	30	81	2nd	R1	R1		(Trinidad and Tobago) Darryl Roberts	28
2015	DIV 2 CL	10	6	3	1	21	12	21	Champions					
2016	DIV 1	26	14	7	5	38	23	49	2nd	R2	R3		(Brazil) Victor Mattos Cardozo	9
2017	T1	34	12	11	11	55	54	47	10th	R1	QF		(Kosovo) Bajram Nebihi	12
2018	T1	34	6	8	20	39	58	26	17th	R2	QF		(Thailand) Apiwat Pengprakon (Thailand) Somsak Musikaphan	5
2019	T2	34	8	6	20	31	56	30	17th	R2	R1		(Brazil) Rogerio	9
2025–26	T3 Northeast	22	7	12	3	28	16	33	4th	Opted out	QR2	Opted out	(Brazil) Osvaldo Nascimento dos Santos Neto	4

Champions	Runners-up	Promoted	Relegated

- P = Played
- W = Games won
- D = Games drawn
- L = Games lost
- F = Goals for
- A = Goals against
- Pts = Points
- Pos = Final position
- N/A = No answer
- TPL = Thai Premier League
- TL = Thai League 1
- QR1 = First Qualifying Round
- QR2 = Second Qualifying Round
- QR3 = Third Qualifying Round
- QR4 = Fourth Qualifying Round
- RInt = Intermediate Round
- R1 = Round 1
- R2 = Round 2
- R3 = Round 3
- R4 = Round 4
- R5 = Round 5
- R6 = Round 6
- GR = Group stage
- QF = Quarter-finals
- SF = Semi-finals
- RU = Runners-up
- S = Shared
- W = Winners

== Coaches ==
Coaches by years (2014–2019)

- (Thailand) Nopporn Eksatra 2014 –2015
- (Thailand) Jakarat Tonhongsa 2015
- (England) Scott Cooper 2015 –2017
- (Finland) Mixu Paatelainen 2018
- (Japan) Sugao Kambe 2018
- (Portugal) Eduardo Almeida 2018 –2019
- (Thailand) Thanaset Amornsinkittichote 2019
- (Thailand) Suriyan Jamchen 2019
- (Thailand) Sirisak Yodyardthai 2019

== Honours ==
- Thai Division 1 League
  - Runners-up (1): 2016
- Regional League Division 2
  - Winners (1): 2015
- Regional League North-East Division
  - Runners-up (1): 2015
