= Thai Honda F.C. =

Thai football club

Thai Honda ไทยฮอนด้า เอฟซี
- Full name: Thai Honda Football Club สโมสรฟุตบอลไทยฮอนด้า
- Nicknames: Fire Eagle (อินทรี อัคนี)
- Founded: 2000
- Dissolved: 2019
- Ground: 72nd Anniversary Stadium (Min Buri); Bangkok, Thailand
- Capacity: 10,000
- Owner: Honda Motorcycle Thailand
Home colours	Away colours	Third colours

Thai Honda Football Club (Thai: สโมสรฟุตบอลไทยฮอนด้า) was a Thai defunct football club last played in the Thai League 2 and sponsored by Honda Motorcycle Thailand. The club was dissolved at the end of the 2019 season.

== History ==
Honda Motorcycle Thailand, or A.P. Honda, started to send teams in the Samut Prakan Cup for the first time in 1971, by having factory employees play. In 2000, they established a football club "Thai Honda Ladkrabang Football Club". The club was promoted to Thai League 1. Some notable players for Thai Honda Ladkrabang were Prasert Choei-taisong, Tripob Chuenchuklin, and Thongchai Kuenkuntod. They were led by head coach Chalermwoot Sa-ngapol. In the next two years, the club was relegated to play in a lower league. To combat this, they changed their management to Phaya Insee Lat Krabang Company Limited on 22 January 2015. The first act of the company was inviting Masami Taki, a Japanese football coach, to cooperate with the club service system and manage the youth development program for the success of the club.

In 2019 Thai Honda decided to dissolve the club due to financial problems.

== Crest history ==
Thai Honda F.C. add text LADKRABANG into their logo in 2017 because Thai Honda factory was located in Ladkrabang and they changed their logo's background color from white to gold in 2017. In 2018 they decided to change the name of the club back to their original name "Thai Honda".

== Stadium ==
72nd Anniversary Stadium (Min Buri) is a home stadium of Thai Honda Football Club since 2007. The stadium holds 10,000 people.

=== Stadium and locations ===
Coordinates	Location	Stadium	Year
13°48′07″N 100°47′27″E	Min Buri, Bangkok	72nd Anniversary Stadium (Min Buri)	2007–2010
13°43′49″N 100°46′20″E	Lat Krabang, Bangkok	King Mongkut's Institute of Technology Ladkrabang Stadium	2010
13°48′07″N 100°47′27″E	Min Buri, Bangkok	72nd Anniversary Stadium (Min Buri)	2011
13°43′49″N 100°46′20″E	Lat Krabang, Bangkok	King Mongkut's Institute of Technology Ladkrabang Stadium	2012–2014
13°48′07″N 100°47′27″E	Min Buri, Bangkok	72nd Anniversary Stadium (Min Buri)	2015–2019

== Season-by-season record ==
Season	League									FA Cup	League Cup	Top scorer	
Season	Division	P	W	D	L	F	A	Pts	Pos	FA Cup	League Cup	Name	Goals
2004–2005	DIV 1								2nd				
2006	TPL	22	4	9	9	23	26	21	11th			Coulibaly Cheick Ismael	3
2007	TPL	30	7	8	15	26	38	29	14th			Ismail Faday Kamara	6
2008	DIV 1	30	9	7	14	29	38	34	13th				
2009	DIV 1	30	8	12	10	30	35	36	11th	R2		Sutin Anukoon	8
2010	DIV 1	30	11	7	12	32	32	40	8th	R2	R3	Nana Yaw Asamoah	6
2011	DIV 1	34	6	6	22	33	69	24	18th	withdrew	R2	Nana Yaw Asamoah	8
2012	DIV 2 Bangkok	34	21	8	5	57	33	71	1st	R2	R1		
2013	DIV 2 Bangkok	26	11	6	9	57	34	39	5th				
2014	DIV 2 Bangkok	26	21	4	1	63	16	67	1st	R3	QR1	Rodoljub Paunović	25+7
2015	DIV 1	38	16	9	13	62	46	57	6th	R4	R2	Gastón González	17
2016	DIV 1	26	14	10	2	46	23	52	1st	R1	R2	Ricardo Jesus	13
2017	T1	34	8	4	22	43	68	28	16th	R2	R1	Ricardo Jesus	9
2018	T2	28	8	8	12	32	39	32	12th	R1	Qualification play-off	Tawin Butsombat	11
2019	T2	34	13	12	9	52	40	51	6th	QF	Qualification play-off	Valdo	17

Champions	Runners-up	Promoted	Relegated

== Club achievements ==
- Thai Division 1 League
  - Winner: 2016
  - Runner-up: 2005
- Regional League Division 2
  - Runner-up: 2014
- Regional League Bangkok Area Division
  - Winner: 2012, 2014
- Khǒr Royal Cup (Tier 3) (ถ้วย ข.)
  - Winner: 2004
- Khor Royal Cup (Tier 4) (ถ้วย ค.)
  - Winner: 2003
- Ngor Royal Cup (ถ้วย ง.)
  - Runner-up: 2002
