= Tung Burapha Stadium =

Football stadium in Thailand

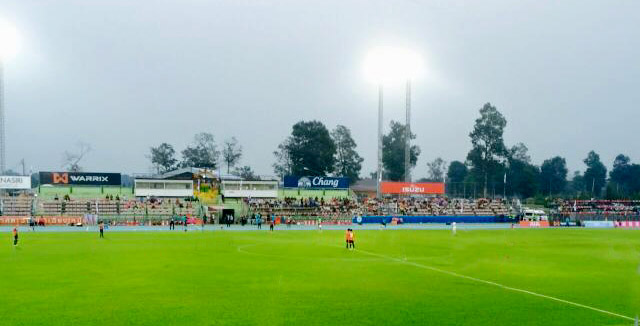
- Interactive map of Tung Burapha Stadium
- Full name: Tung Burapha Stadium
- Location: Jaeramair Municipality, Mueang Ubon Ratchathani, Ubon Ratchathani, Thailand
- Coordinates: 15.304772°N 104.783922°E
- Owner: Ubon Ratchathani Municipality
- Operator: Ubon Ratchathani Municipality
- Capacity: 10,000
- Surface: Grass

Tung Burapha Stadium (Thai: สนามกีฬาทุ่งบูรพา) is a football stadium in Ubon Ratchathani, Thailand. The stadium is used for football matches. The stadium holds 10,000 people.
