= Borja Navarro (footballer, born 1990) =

Spanish footballer

Personal information
- Full name: Borja Navarro García
- Date of birth: 14 May 1990 (age 36)
- Place of birth: Gijón, Spain
- Height: 1.75 m (5 ft 9 in)
- Position: Forward

Team information
- Current team: Caudal

Youth career
- 2001–2009: Sporting Gijón

Senior career*
Years	Team	Apps	(Gls)
2008–2011	Sporting B	43	(7)
2010	Sporting Gijón	2	(0)
2011–2012	Lemona	15	(1)
2012	Guijuelo	10	(0)
2012–2014	Caudal	40	(17)
2014–2015	Albacete	13	(2)
2014–2015	→ Compostela (loan)	27	(6)
2015	Pattaya United	12	(6)
2016	Almería B	8	(1)
2016	Chiangmai	9	(3)
2017–2020	Caudal	67	(14)
- * Club domestic league appearances and goals as of 12 November 2017

Borja Navarro García (born 14 May 1990) was a Spanish footballer who plays for Caudal Deportivo as a forward.

== Football career ==
Born in Gijón, Asturias, Navarro played youth football with local giants Sporting de Gijón. In November 2008, still a junior, he began appearing professionally with the B-team in Segunda División B.

Navarro made his main squad – and La Liga – debut on 7 February 2010, playing the last 13 minutes in a 1–3 away loss against UD Almería. After being released by Sporting he resumed his career in the third level, representing SD Lemona, CD Guijuelo, Caudal Deportivo and Albacete Balompié. With the latter he achieved promotion to Segunda División, appearing in 13 matches and scoring once.

On 19 August 2014 Navarro was loaned to SD Compostela, in the third level. On 3 August of the following year he moved abroad, joining Thai Division 1 League club Pattaya United F.C.
