= Felipe Ferreira (footballer, born 1988) =

Brazilian footballer

Personal information
- Full name: Felipe Ferreira de Moraes Honório
- Date of birth: 22 September 1988 (age 38)
- Place of birth: Brazil
- Height: 1.84 m (6 ft 0 in)
- Position: Midfielder

Senior career*
Years	Team	Apps	(Gls)
2009–2010	Volta Redonda		
2011–2013	Police United	24	(4)
2014	Siam Navy	24	(7)
2015	Sukhothai	33	(25)
2016	Siam Navy	11	(0)
2016	Chiangmai		
2017	Trat		
- * Club domestic league appearances and goals

Felipe Ferreira de Moraes Honório (born 22 September 1988) is a Brazilian former professional footballer who played as a midfielder.
