= Thai League 3 Cup =

- Organiser(s): Football Association of Thailand
- Founded: 2023; 3 years ago
- Region: Thailand
- Teams: 55
- Current champions: PT Satun (1st title)
- Most championships: Phatthalung, Thonburi United, PT Satun (1 title)
- Website: Official website
- 2026–27 Thai League 3 Cup

The Thai League 3 Cup, currently known as the BGC Muang Thai Insurance Cup for sponsorship reasons, is an annual knockout competition in men's domestic football in Thailand. Organized by the Football Association of Thailand (FA Thailand), it is open to any clubs within Thai League 3, the third tier of the Thai football league system.

== History ==
The Thai League 3 Cup was established in 2023 through a collaboration between the Football Association of Thailand, Thai League Company Limited, BG Container Glass Public Company Limited, and Muang Thai Insurance Public Company Limited. Launched under the name BGC Muang Thai Insurance Cup, the tournament is exclusively for football clubs competing in Thai League 3, the third tier of the Thai football league system.

In the 2023–24 season, the inaugural edition of the competition featured a traditional knockout format. All rounds were contested as single-leg ties, except for the semi-finals, which were played over two legs. The competition successfully established itself as a platform for Thai League 3 clubs to showcase their capabilities while competing for prestigious honors and substantial prize money.

In the 2024–25 season, the format underwent significant changes to further elevate the competitive nature of the tournament. The competition was divided into two phases:

- The League Phase, where clubs competed regionally with a fixed number of matches against randomly drawn opponents. This phase emphasized regional rivalries and ensured broader participation.
- The Knockout Phase, which retained the single-elimination format, starting from the Round of 16 and concluding with the final.

These changes reflect the organizers' continuous efforts to innovate and provide an engaging competition structure while maintaining the essence of a knockout tournament.

== Format ==
Thai League 3 Cup is open to all members of the Football Association of Thailand that compete in Thai League 3.

Starting in the 2024–25 season, the competition is divided into two distinct phases:

League Phase

- Clubs are grouped into six regions, mirroring the regional structure of Thai League 3.
- Each club plays four matches—two home and two away—against randomly assigned opponents within their region.
- The top two clubs from each region automatically qualify for the Knockout Phase, along with the four best third-placed clubs, determined by ranking across all regions.

Knockout Phase

- The phase starts from the Round of 16, progressing through the quarter-finals, semi-finals, and concluding with the final.
- Matches are played as single-leg ties, except for the semi-finals, which are conducted over two legs. In the semi-finals, the away goals rule is applied, and penalty shootouts are used if the aggregate score remains tied.

The final match is held at a neutral venue and is decided by a penalty shootout if the score remains level after extra time.

== Final ==
No.	Year	Winner	Score	Runners-up	Venue
1	2023–24	Phatthalung	1–0 (a.e.t.)	Maejo United	BG Stadium
2	2024–25	Thonburi United	0–0 (a.e.t.) (5–4 p)	Songkhla	BG Stadium
3	2025–26	PT Satun	3–2	Thonburi United	True BG Stadium

== Sponsorship ==
From 2023 to the present, the Thai League 3 Cup has attracted title sponsorship, the Thai League 3 Cup was named after its sponsor, giving it the following names:

Period	Sponsor	Name	Trophy
2023 to present	BG Container Glass (BGC) and Muang Thai Insurance (MTI)	BGC Muang Thai Insurance Cup	Sponsor designed
