= 2024–25 Thai League 3 Cup =

BGC Muang Thai Insurance Cup

Tournament details
- Country: Thailand
- Dates: 30 November 2024 – 19 April 2025
- Teams: 55

Final positions
- Champions: Thonburi United (1st title)
- Runners-up: Songkhla

Tournament statistics
- Matches played: 127
- Goals scored: 366 (2.88 per match)
- Top goal scorer(s): Bouda Henry Ismaël, Felipe Vasconcelos Paim, Lucas Gaudencio Moraes, Teerapong Malai (6 goals)

Awards
- Best player: Sirakorn Pimbaotham

The 2024–25 Thai League 3 Cup is the 2nd season of a Thailand's knockout football competition. Matches are organized into two phases: the league and the knockout phases. In the league phase, clubs compete in a regionally based format with a fixed number of matches per club, while the knockout phase follows a single-elimination structure. The competition retains its sponsorship by BG Container Glass (BGC) and Muang Thai Insurance (MTI), and it is officially named the BGC Muang Thai Insurance Cup (Thai: บีจีซี เมืองไทยประกันภัย คัพ). A total of 55 clubs from the 2024–25 Thai League 3 are participating, a decrease from 58 clubs in the inaugural season. The tournament commenced on 30 November 2024 and concluded with the final on 19 April 2025. The prize pool remains unchanged, with the champions awarded 3 million baht and the runners-up receiving 1 million baht.

== Calendar ==
Round	Date	Matches	Clubs	New entries this round
League phase	30 November – 26 December 2024	110	55 → 16	55 2023–24 Thai League 3
Round of 16	4–5 January 2025	8	16 → 8	
Quarter-finals	11–12 January 2025	4	8 → 4	
Semi-finals	12 February 2025 (1st leg); 5 March 2025 (2nd leg)	4	4 → 2	
Final	19 April 2025	1	2 → Champions	
Total				55 clubs

== Results ==
Note: N: Clubs from Northern region; NE: Clubs from Northeastern region; E: Clubs from Eastern region; C: Clubs from Central region; W: Clubs from Western region; S: Clubs from Southern region.

=== League phase ===
In the league phase, the 55 participating clubs are divided into six regions based on the 2024–25 Thai League 3 regional divisions. Unlike a traditional round-robin system, each club plays four matches (two at home and two away) against opponents randomly drawn by a computerized system within their region. Standings are maintained separately for each region. At the end of the league phase, the top two clubs from each region automatically qualify for the knockout phase. Additionally, the third-placed clubs from all six regions are ranked against each other, with the four best-performing clubs earning the remaining slots in the knockout phase.

==== Upper group ====
===== Northern region =====
Pos	Team	Pld	W	D	L	GF	GA	GD	Pts	Qualification
1	Northern Nakhon Mae Sot United	4	3	1	0	8	3	+5	10	Advance to round of 16
2	Phitsanulok	4	3	0	1	7	3	+4	9	Advance to round of 16
3	TPF Uttaradit	4	2	1	1	6	4	+2	7	
4	Phitsanulok Unity	4	2	1	1	5	4	+1	7	
5	Maejo United	4	2	0	2	4	5	−1	6	
6	Chiangmai	4	1	2	1	7	6	+1	5	
7	Nakhon Sawan See Khwae City	4	1	2	1	5	6	−1	5	
8	Chattrakan City	4	1	1	2	3	4	−1	4	
9	Khelang United	4	1	1	2	4	6	−2	4	
10	Chiangrai City	4	0	2	2	3	6	−3	2	
11	Kamphaengphet	4	0	1	3	2	7	−5	1	

Source: Thai League
Rules for classification: 1) Points; 2) Goal difference; 3) Goals scored; 4) Away goals scored; 5) Wins; 6) Away wins.

30 November 2024	Khelang United (N)	2–1	Phitsanulok Unity (N)	Mueang, Lampang
15:30 (UTC+7)	Thanachok Chitrak 21', 78'	Report	Athip Kaeochaeng 45'	Stadium: Stadium of Lampang Rajabhat University; Attendance: 68; Referee: Thanison Onjiw; Assistant referees: Siwakorn Singthana, Sumetee Khaokaew; Fourth official: Thanongsak Sutthi

30 November 2024	Chattrakan City (N)	1–3	Northern Nakhon Mae Sot United (N)	Mueang, Phitsanulok
15:30 (UTC+7)	Kazutaka Sato 81'	Report	Chatchai Narkwijit 6'; Thanat Tangnontanakorn 52', 87'	Stadium: Stadium of Pibulsongkram Rajabhat University; Attendance: 113; Referee: Chirawat Chomphoosee; Assistant referees: Kosit Laochaem, Pramote Boon-in; Fourth official: Prasert Arjpukdee

30 November 2024	Maejo United (N)	1–0	TPF Uttaradit (N)	Doi Saket, Chiang Mai
15:30 (UTC+7)	Sakeereen Teekasom 79'	Report; Highlight		Stadium: Stadium of Rajamangala University of Technology Lanna, Doi Saket Campus; Attendance: 56; Referee: Bongkod Tiansavang; Assistant referees: Panuwat Khuanpet, Tudsanee Khuanpet; Fourth official: Akkarachai Khanthalee

1 December 2024	Chiangrai City (N)	2–3	Phitsanulok (N)	Mueang, Chiang Rai
17:00 (UTC+7)	Sirachat Chanthima 26'; Chinngoen Phutonyong 46'	Report	Jakkit Niyomsuk 62'; Cho Woo-hyuk 78'; Ekene Victor Azike 86'	Stadium: Singha Chiangrai Stadium; Attendance: 61; Referee: Nattawut Pornchaiwirun; Assistant referees: Thanawat Sangkon, Chanin Cherdkamphaeng; Fourth official: Chalit Ploypech

1 December 2024	Chiangmai (N)	2–0	Kamphaengphet (N)	Doi Saket, Chiang Mai
18:00 (UTC+7)	Partchya Katethip 78'; Kittiphong Pluemjai 90'	Report; Highlight		Stadium: Stadium of Rajamangala University of Technology Lanna, Doi Saket Campus; Attendance: 493; Referee: Opars Oomsomsuai; Assistant referees: Kritsawaphong Khamta, Thanaporn Ouicharoen; Fourth official: Wuttichai Lo-in

7 December 2024	Northern Nakhon Mae Sot United (N)	2–1	Khelang United (N)	Mae Sot, Tak
15:30 (UTC+7)	Ekue Andre Houma 41', 69'	Report	Mathas Kajaree 34'	Stadium: Five Border Districts Stadium; Attendance: 112; Referee: Tanavit Prompet; Assistant referees: Thanapak Nualchan, Apipong Saehoe; Fourth official: Prasert Arjpukdee

7 December 2024	Nakhon Sawan See Khwae City (N)	2–2	Chiangmai (N)	Mueang, Nakhon Sawan
15:30 (UTC+7)	Nontawat Onsuebsai 42'; Thitiphan Khanoeinham 52'	Report; Highlight	Felipe Micael 56', 70'	Stadium: Nakhon Sawan Provincial Stadium; Attendance: 270; Referee: Akkarachai Khanthalee; Assistant referees: Warayut Jantakhun, Vithit Wilasphaingoen; Fourth official: Wuttichai Lo-in

7 December 2024	Phitsanulok (N)	3–0	Maejo United (N)	Mueang, Phitsanulok
18:00 (UTC+7)	Ekene Victor Azike 65', 70', 79'	Report; Highlight		Stadium: Phitsanulok PAO. Stadium; Attendance: 1,286; Referee: Chookiat Boonchoo; Assistant referees: Narapat Nittayachat, Pramote Boon-in; Fourth official: Thanison Onjiw

8 December 2024	Kamphaengphet (N)	1–1	Chiangrai City (N)	Mueang, Kamphaeng Phet
15:30 (UTC+7)	Kawin Nuanthat 78'	Report	Kotchakan Thammasut 65'	Stadium: Cha Kung Rao Stadium; Attendance: 90; Referee: Suchart Kuisue; Assistant referees: Pitak Lungyu, Kittinun Saiprang; Fourth official: Nattawut Pornchaiwirun

8 December 2024	Phitsanulok Unity (N)	1–0	Chattrakan City (N)	Mueang, Phitsanulok
18:00 (UTC+7)	Rachen Kunkhong 49'	Report		Stadium: Phitsanulok PAO. Stadium; Attendance: 115; Referee: Doungkaew Doungtawan; Assistant referees: Khachonphong Singthana, Jarin Champakpriew; Fourth official: Thanongsak Sutthi

14 December 2024	TPF Uttaradit (N)	2–0	Nakhon Sawan See Khwae City (N)	Mueang, Uttaradit
15:30 (UTC+7)	Timothy Chiemerie Okereke 7'; Kullawat Silae 79'	Report		Stadium: Uttaradit Provincial Stadium; Attendance: 182; Referee: Ekkachai Juywong; Assistant referees: Suttinan Kanchana, Pramote Boon-in; Fourth official: Chirawat Chomphoosee

14 December 2024	Khelang United (N)	1–1	Chiangmai (N)	Mueang, Lampang
15:30 (UTC+7)	Suksan Kaewpanya 88'	Report; Highlight	Nitiphon Prombut 12'	Stadium: Stadium of Lampang Rajabhat University; Attendance: 80; Referee: Chitchanuphong Ketsana; Assistant referees: Ronachai Raepang, Jonrak Sangcharern; Fourth official: Chookiat Boonchoo

14 December 2024	Phitsanulok (N)	0–1	Phitsanulok Unity (N)	Mueang, Phitsanulok
18:00 (UTC+7)		Report	Kunburus Sounses 60'	Stadium: Phitsanulok PAO. Stadium; Attendance: 1,542; Referee: Chalit Ploypech; Assistant referees: Thanapon Kanchanaudom, Narodom Phonprasit; Fourth official: Akkarachai Khanthalee

15 December 2024	Maejo United (N)	3–1	Kamphaengphet (N)	Doi Saket, Chiang Mai
15:30 (UTC+7)	Montree Siriwattanasuwan 68'; Thongchai Ampornwiman 89' (pen.); Douglas Mineiro 90+4'	Report; Highlight	Khwanchai Bunprakhom 54'	Stadium: Stadium of Rajamangala University of Technology Lanna, Doi Saket Campus; Attendance: 50; Referee: Prasert Arjpukdee; Assistant referees: Chanin Cherdkamphaeng, Thanapak Nualchan; Fourth official: Doungkaew Doungtawan

16 December 2024	Chiangrai City (N)	0–0	Chattrakan City (N)	Mueang, Chiang Rai
17:00 (UTC+7)		Report		Stadium: Singha Chiangrai Stadium; Attendance: 63; Referee: Supat Chaingam; Assistant referees: Saksit Jantain, Weera Banlengchai; Fourth official: Pitak Lungyu

18 December 2024	TPF Uttaradit (N)	1–1	Northern Nakhon Mae Sot United (N)	Mueang, Phrae
15:30 (UTC+7)	Saran Sridet 81' (pen.)	Report; Highlight	Ekue Andre Houma 42'	Stadium: Huai Ma Stadium; Attendance: 90; Referee: Suchart Kuisue; Assistant referees: Phattharawet Saesong, Apipong Saehoe; Fourth official: Ekkachai Juywong

18 December 2024	Phitsanulok Unity (N)	2–2	Nakhon Sawan See Khwae City (N)	Mueang, Phitsanulok
18:00 (UTC+7)	Luan Borges Machado Martins 12'; Premsak Chantum 54'	Report	Narong Jansawek 74', 77'	Stadium: Phitsanulok PAO. Stadium; Attendance: 50; Referee: Chirawat Chomphoosee; Assistant referees: Vithit Wilasphaingoen, Kittinun Saiprang; Fourth official: Chalit Ploypech

21 December 2024	Northern Nakhon Mae Sot United (N)	2–0	Chiangrai City (N)	Mae Sot, Tak
15:30 (UTC+7)	Ekue Andre Houma 9'; Cedrick Platini Kaham 67'	Report		Stadium: Five Border Districts Stadium; Attendance: 160; Referee: Chalit Ploypech; Assistant referees: Weera Banlengchai, Narapat Nittayachat; Fourth official: Wuttichai Lo-in

21 December 2024	Chiangmai (N)	2–3	TPF Uttaradit (N)	Doi Saket, Chiang Mai
15:30 (UTC+7)	Ritthidet Phensawat 45+1'; Nitiphon Prombut 89'	Report; Highlight	Kaison Roungreang 3', 52'; Ruslan Zaerko 26'	Stadium: Stadium of Rajamangala University of Technology Lanna, Doi Saket Campus; Attendance: 104; Referee: Supat Chaingam; Assistant referees: Nonthanan Khanthawong, Pramote Boon-in; Fourth official: Songrit Trakulchai

21 December 2024	Chattrakan City (N)	2–0	Khelang United (N)	Mueang, Phitsanulok
15:30 (UTC+7)	Rattanachai Nualkham 26'; Supakorn Narknoi 82'	Report		Stadium: Stadium of Pibulsongkram Rajabhat University; Attendance: 155; Referee: Akkarachai Khanthalee; Assistant referees: Suttinan Kanchana, Sumetee Khaokaew; Fourth official: Suphanat Yainta

21 December 2024	Nakhon Sawan See Khwae City (N)	1–0	Maejo United (N)	Mueang, Nakhon Sawan
15:30 (UTC+7)	Sattrawut Auppachai 55'	Report		Stadium: Stadium of Nakhon Sawan Sports School; Attendance: 21; Referee: Woottipong Ketkam; Assistant referees: Waranyoo Chomgoson, Kosit Laochaem; Fourth official: Ketdumrong Khemthong

22 December 2024	Kamphaengphet (N)	0–1	Phitsanulok (N)	Mueang, Kamphaeng Phet
15:30 (UTC+7)		Report	Wanchana Rattana 72'	Stadium: Cha Kung Rao Stadium; Attendance: 224; Referee: Doungkaew Doungtawan; Assistant referees: Pitak Lungyu, Suthipong Ontuwong; Fourth official: Jakkapong Pongpathet

===== Northeastern region =====
Pos	Team	Pld	W	D	L	GF	GA	GD	Pts	Qualification
1	Udon United	4	3	1	0	6	2	+4	10	Advance to round of 16
2	Khon Kaen	4	2	2	0	12	3	+9	8	Advance to round of 16
3	Muang Loei United	4	2	1	1	7	5	+2	7	Advance to round of 16
4	Ubon Kruanapat	4	2	1	1	5	3	+2	7	
5	Roi Et PB United	4	0	3	1	7	8	−1	3	
6	Suranaree Black Cat	4	0	1	3	2	7	−5	1	
7	Surin Khong Chee Mool	4	0	1	3	6	17	−11	1	

Source: Thai League
Rules for classification: 1) Points; 2) Goal difference; 3) Goals scored; 4) Away goals scored; 5) Wins; 6) Away wins.

30 November 2024	Udon United (NE)	1–0	Ubon Kruanapat (NE)	Mueang, Udon Thani
17:00 (UTC+7)	Thawatchai Aocharod 85'	Report		Stadium: Stadium of Thailand National Sports University, Udon Thani Campus; Attendance: 142; Referee: Pisal Motongsri; Assistant referees: Chinnawat Kottai, Jakkrit Nahuanin; Fourth official: Chaisiri Sonnam

1 December 2024	Suranaree Black Cat (NE)	1–3	Muang Loei United (NE)	Mueang, Nakhon Ratchasima
15:30 (UTC+7)	Christian Joseph Sacchini 3'	Report	Amporn Chaipong 53', 64'; Mitsada Saitaifah 60'	Stadium: Stadium of Fort Suranaree; Attendance: 43; Referee: Seksan Wongkam; Assistant referees: Payao Khuankhanueng, Surachart Thasungka; Fourth official: Nattapol Sararat

1 December 2024	Khon Kaen (NE)	2–2	Roi Et PB United (NE)	Mueang, Khon Kaen
18:00 (UTC+7)	Punyachotc Namjatturat 72', 75'	Report	Saichon Magmesoog 1'; Suphakrit Dongchan 86'	Stadium: Khon Kaen PAO. Stadium; Attendance: 570; Referee: Vitsawa Nanchana; Assistant referees: Thammanoon Sasen, Mitra Matarat; Fourth official: Anantip Phopan

7 December 2024	Roi Et PB United (NE)	1–2	Udon United (NE)	Mueang, Roi Et
15:30 (UTC+7)	Santirad Weing-in 5'	Report	Sakda Noppakdee 74'; Thawatchai Aocharod 90+5'	Stadium: Roi Et Provincial Stadium; Attendance: 755; Referee: Teerapak Saibun; Assistant referees: Kittiphan Kunlasing, Chinnawat Kaiyasit; Fourth official: Natthapol Sewakawihalee

7 December 2024	Muang Loei United (NE)	0–1	Khon Kaen (NE)	Mueang, Loei
18:00 (UTC+7)		Report; Highlight	Charin Boodhad 86'	Stadium: Stadium of Loei Rajabhat University; Attendance: 189; Referee: Yodsakorn Pakdeesuwan; Assistant referees: Surawut Nuanyoi, Tanawat Boonma; Fourth official: Theerawat Lodkhamtuy

8 December 2024	Ubon Kruanapat (NE)	2–0	Surin Khong Chee Mool (NE)	Mueang, Ubon Ratchathani
18:00 (UTC+7)	Oscar Plape 19'; Thakdanai Phamchungkung 73'	Report; Highlight		Stadium: Stadium of Ubon Ratchathani Rajabhat University; Attendance: 260; Referee: Watcharachat Loumpool; Assistant referees: Kittiwat Kittpaksakun, Athipbordee Seekhoaun; Fourth official: Nakarin Thongkerd

14 December 2024	Surin Khong Chee Mool (NE)	2–2	Roi Et PB United (NE)	Mueang, Roi Et
15:30 (UTC+7)	Aphiwat Chaenban 19', 90'	Report; Highlight	Santirad Weing-in 52', 66'	Stadium: Roi Et Provincial Stadium; Attendance: 475; Referee: Nakarin Thongkerd; Assistant referees: Thanapon Suwannaket, Chindanai Cha-umphan; Fourth official: Uthai Purase

14 December 2024	Khon Kaen (NE)	0–0	Suranaree Black Cat (NE)	Mueang, Khon Kaen
18:00 (UTC+7)		Report		Stadium: Khon Kaen PAO. Stadium; Attendance: 839; Referee: Kroekkiad Laosing; Assistant referees: Chaloemwong Sowannakan, Nawapon Roopsom; Fourth official: Kittichot Worasan

15 December 2024	Udon United (NE)	0–0	Muang Loei United (NE)	Mueang, Udon Thani
17:00 (UTC+7)		Report		Stadium: Stadium of Thailand National Sports University, Udon Thani Campus; Attendance: 222; Referee: Suparak Nilkad; Assistant referees: Thatchai Sitthikhotr, Natthaphong Saengsuwannarat; Fourth official: Natdanai Pongjit

18 December 2024	Surin Khong Chee Mool (NE)	1–9	Khon Kaen (NE)	Mueang, Surin
15:30 (UTC+7)	Aphiwat Chaenban 90'	Report	Ratthaphon Phoopharot 26'; Charin Boodhad 41'; Aphiwat Mitrak 47', 48', 65'; João Guimarães 74'; Kitchaphum Monthianart 84'; Worawaran Pholuea 88'; Suphakit Thongthawee 90+1'	Stadium: Sri Narong Stadium; Attendance: 35; Referee: Sittichai Saramai; Assistant referees: Saharat Juktirit, Setthawut Yothachan; Fourth official: Surachart Thasungka

18 December 2024	Ubon Kruanapat (NE)	1–0	Suranaree Black Cat (NE)	Mueang, Ubon Ratchathani
17:00 (UTC+7)	Phutawan Apilap 90+1' (o.g.)	Report; Highlight		Stadium: Stadium of Ubon Ratchathani Rajabhat University; Attendance: 217; Referee: Suriyawong Ramsri; Assistant referees: Sittisak Kaewkam, Chadmongkol Natanreep; Fourth official: Thinakorn Daensamsuan

21 December 2024	Roi Et PB United (NE)	2–2	Ubon Kruanapat (NE)	Mueang, Roi Et
15:30 (UTC+7)	Andrey Coutinho 11' (pen.); Nuttawut Chanachan 87'	Report	Wanchaiya Charoenloi 25'; Thakdanai Phamchungkung 53'	Stadium: Roi Et Provincial Stadium; Attendance: 365; Referee: Chairat Phooalai; Assistant referees: Teeramate Pooprang, Teerasauk Pengpidet; Fourth official: Thawatchai Sangsanit

21 December 2024	Suranaree Black Cat (NE)	1–3	Udon United (NE)	Mueang, Nakhon Ratchasima
15:30 (UTC+7)	Phuphat Pakare 7'	Report	Jirayu Saenap 31'; Sakda Noppakdee 45+3'; Luiz Júnior 70'	Stadium: Stadium of Fort Suranaree; Referee: Rutratchapoom Moolpong; Assistant referees: Setthawut Yothachan, Saharat Juktirit; Fourth official: Yodsakorn Pakdeesuwan

21 December 2024	Muang Loei United (NE)	4–3	Surin Khong Chee Mool (NE)	Mueang, Loei
15:30 (UTC+7)	Aliu Micheal Abdul 22' (pen.), 68'; Taveechai Kliangklao 39'; Amporn Chaipong 55'	Report; Highlight	Aphiwat Chaenban 5'; Pannawat Wichaiyo 49'; Chayapon Udornpan 83'	Stadium: Stadium of Loei Rajabhat University; Attendance: 230; Referee: Manut Pimol; Assistant referees: Komkrit Sawong, Phumirin Srisumang; Fourth official: Sutiwat Kaewkhunthong

===== Eastern region =====
Pos	Team	Pld	W	D	L	GF	GA	GD	Pts	Qualification
1	Navy	4	4	0	0	14	1	+13	12	Advance to round of 16
2	Pluakdaeng United	4	4	0	0	12	5	+7	12	Advance to round of 16
3	Saimit Kabin United	4	3	1	0	10	5	+5	10	Advance to round of 16
4	Bankhai United	4	3	0	1	10	5	+5	9	
5	BFB Pattaya City	4	2	2	0	4	2	+2	8	
6	Toko Customs United	4	2	0	2	11	9	+2	6	
7	Fleet	4	1	0	3	7	10	−3	3	
8	Samut Prakan	4	1	0	3	4	8	−4	3	
9	Chachoengsao Hi-Tek	4	1	0	3	3	8	−5	3	
10	Padriew City	4	1	0	3	3	10	−7	3	
11	Marines	4	0	1	3	1	10	−9	1	
12	ACDC	4	0	0	4	9	15	−6	0	

Source: Thai League
Rules for classification: 1) Points; 2) Goal difference; 3) Goals scored; 4) Away goals scored; 5) Wins; 6) Away wins.

30 November 2024	ACDC (E)	1–2	Bankhai United (E)	Sattahip, Chonburi
15:30 (UTC+7)	Krisnatee Kaewrakmuk 74'	Report	Lucas Daubermann 73'; Apichat Sarai 90+4'	Stadium: Battleship Stadium; Attendance: 129; Referee: Chaiwat Rupsa-at; Assistant referees: Premsak Rungrueang, Siravich Konngam; Fourth official: Pornthep Promsopa

30 November 2024	Chachoengsao Hi-Tek (E)	0–1	Padriew City (E)	Mueang, Chachoengsao
18:00 (UTC+7)		Report; Highlight	Natapon Srisawat 45'	Stadium: Chachoengsao Town Municipality Stadium; Attendance: 603; Referee: Nararit Srivorakul; Assistant referees: Kodcharat Rattanachot, Adisai Pongnairat; Fourth official: Chayapol Laosuphan

30 November 2024	Navy (E)	2–1	Toko Customs United (E)	Sattahip, Chonburi
18:00 (UTC+7)	Thanphisit Hempandan 5', 37'	Report	Teerawat Banchamek 40'	Stadium: Sattahip Navy Stadium; Referee: Palathip Homwarn; Assistant referees: Apidet Rawangton, Suwida Wongkraisorn; Fourth official: Panya Nawasimainam

1 December 2024	Fleet (E)	1–3	Samut Prakan (E)	Sattahip, Chonburi
15:30 (UTC+7)	Suraphon Potha 45+4'	Report; Highlight	Anothai Pongkan 24'; Tepasin Mueangsuk 44' (pen.); Siwa Sangsuk 73'	Stadium: Battleship Stadium; Attendance: 99; Referee: Kanakorn Teansawat; Assistant referees: Adisai Pongnairat, Weerayut Sittipeng; Fourth official: Panya Nawasimainam

1 December 2024	Marines (E)	1–2	Pluakdaeng United (E)	Sattahip, Chonburi
15:30 (UTC+7)	Nuttawut Onin 76' (pen.)	Report	Chinathip Phormthong 42'; Amondeth Kittipornpracha 62'	Stadium: Sattahip Navy Stadium; Attendance: 145; Referee: Niruch Panjontuk; Assistant referees: Kanathip Waithaisong, Peeyaporn Worachaikueakun; Fourth official: Anocha Praphatson

1 December 2024	BFB Pattaya City (E)	1–1	Saimit Kabin United (E)	Bang Lamung, Chonburi
17:00 (UTC+7)	Phadungkiad Koedphon 85'	Report	Sonkritsana Sirimanon 57'	Stadium: Nong Prue Stadium; Attendance: 208; Referee: Theerayut Radarit; Assistant referees: Ekkalak Muangkhotr, Thanadon Tantrakul; Fourth official: Puttipong Saensarn

7 December 2024	Pluakdaeng United (E)	2–0	Fleet (E)	Pluak Daeng, Rayong
15:30 (UTC+7)	Chinathip Phormthong 45+2'; Thiago Santos 90+6' (pen.)	Report		Stadium: CK Stadium; Attendance: 120; Referee: Watcharasak Intharak; Assistant referees: Weerayut Sittipeng, Monruedee Junmai; Fourth official: Kanakorn Teansawat

7 December 2024	Saimit Kabin United (E)	3–0	Marines (E)	Kabin Buri, Prachinburi
15:30 (UTC+7)	Sonkritsana Sirimanon 25'; Ademola Sodiq Adeyemi 56'; Wasan Mala 67'	Report		Stadium: Nomklao Maharat Stadium; Attendance: 200; Referee: Nararit Srivorakul; Assistant referees: Premsak Rungrueang, Jakkarin Pirunkan; Fourth official: Chaiwat Rupsa-at

8 December 2024	Samut Prakan (E)	1–2	Chachoengsao Hi-Tek (E)	Bang Sao Thong, Samut Prakan
15:30 (UTC+7)	Natthawut Srichan 28'	Report	Kittisak Bunmak 51'; Phuwadol Soma 57'	Stadium: Samut Prakan Stadium; Attendance: 100; Referee: Anocha Praphatson; Assistant referees: Adisai Pongnairat, Kanakorn Teansawat; Fourth official: Chaiyot Hapholdee

8 December 2024	Toko Customs United (E)	6–4	ACDC (E)	Bang Phli, Samut Prakan
16:30 (UTC+7)	Kueanun Junumpai 10', 53', 90'; Siratee Pusawasjaroen 16'; Noppaklao Damrongthai 43'; Siwakorn Tawasiko 90+4'	Report	Ratthathammanun Deeying 1'; Arthit Nongdai 31'; Artit Sankla 48'; Apisit Nonkrathok 60'	Stadium: Stadium of Customs Department, Lad Krabang 54; Attendance: 118; Referee: Pornthep Promsopa; Assistant referees: Wararit Suwanjira, Thanadon Tantrakul; Fourth official: Theerayut Radarit

8 December 2024	Padriew City (E)	0–3	Navy (E)	Mueang, Chachoengsao
18:00 (UTC+7)		Report; Highlight	Arthit Bua-ngam 50'; Panigazzi Matías Ignacio 59'; Thanphisit Hempandan 77'	Stadium: Chachoengsao Provincial Stadium; Attendance: 250; Referee: Niruch Panjontuk; Assistant referees: Jakkarin Pirunkan, Kanathip Waithaisong; Fourth official: Narit Mungtoemklang

8 December 2024	Bankhai United (E)	1–2	BFB Pattaya City (E)	Ban Khai, Rayong
18:00 (UTC+7)	Lucas Daubermann 90+2'	Report	Karuna Nattapong 33'; Baramee Dangtadthong 79'	Stadium: Wai Krong Stadium; Attendance: 266; Referee: Chayapol Laosuphan; Assistant referees: Chaiwat Rupsa-at, Peeyaporn Worachaikueakun; Fourth official: Panya Nawasimainam

14 December 2024	ACDC (E)	1–2	Saimit Kabin United (E)	Sattahip, Chonburi
15:30 (UTC+7)	Natchapol Jitkasem 88'	Report	Guilherme Moreira 69'; Wanthana Chaisawan 78'	Stadium: Battleship Stadium; Referee: Panya Nawasimainam; Assistant referees: Adisai Pongnairat, Samroeng Kamruang; Fourth official: Kanakorn Teansawat

14 December 2024	Chachoengsao Hi-Tek (E)	1–3	Pluakdaeng United (E)	Mueang, Chachoengsao
18:00 (UTC+7)	Tanakrit Lomnak 90+2'	Report	Warut Trongkratok 30' (pen.); Teerapong Malai 46'; Ahmed Saad Lotfy Elnoamany 57'	Stadium: Chachoengsao Town Municipality Stadium; Attendance: 189; Referee: Puttipong Saensarn; Assistant referees: Thanadon Tantrakul, Komsan Wantavee; Fourth official: Nararit Srivorakul

14 December 2024	Bankhai United (E)	3–1	Toko Customs United (E)	Ban Khai, Rayong
18:00 (UTC+7)	Aphirak Suankan 11'; Anucha Phantong 87', 90+1'	Report	Ronnachai Rangsiyo 89'	Stadium: Wai Krong Stadium; Attendance: 239; Referee: Theerapon Nakthong; Assistant referees: Siravich Konngam, Premsak Rungrueang; Fourth official: Anocha Praphatson

15 December 2024	Fleet (E)	3–1	Padriew City (E)	Sattahip, Chonburi
15:30 (UTC+7)	Osvaldo Nascimento dos Santos Neto 30'; Chayaphat Srirat 41'; Pedro Manzi 70'	Report; Highlight	Weerachai Paencokesung 62'	Stadium: Battleship Stadium; Attendance: 92; Referee: Chaiwat Rupsa-at; Assistant referees: Samroeng Kamruang, Siravich Konngam; Fourth official: Anocha Praphatson

15 December 2024	BFB Pattaya City (E)	1–0	Samut Prakan (E)	Bang Lamung, Chonburi
17:00 (UTC+7)	Thammathon Narikham 45+4'	Report		Stadium: Nong Prue Stadium; Attendance: 232; Referee: Theerayut Radarit; Assistant referees: Kanathip Waithaisong, Adisai Pongnairat; Fourth official: Narit Mungtoemklang

15 December 2024	Navy (E)	5–0	Marines (E)	Sattahip, Chonburi
18:00 (UTC+7)	Panigazzi Matías Ignacio 34', 62', 81'; Thanphisit Hempandan 69'; Thatchapol Chai-yan 90'	Report		Stadium: Sattahip Navy Stadium; Attendance: 200; Referee: Booncharoen Phochai; Assistant referees: Wararit Suwanjira, Premsak Rungrueang; Fourth official: Niruch Panjontuk

21 December 2024	Samut Prakan (E)	0–4	Navy (E)	Bang Sao Thong, Samut Prakan
15:30 (UTC+7)		Report	Arthit Bua-ngam 4'; Thanphisit Hempandan 15'; Chutikom Klinjumpasri 54'; Luan Santos 61'	Stadium: Samut Prakan Stadium; Attendance: 99; Referee: Panya Nawasimainam; Assistant referees: Watcharasak Intharak, Monruedee Junmai; Fourth official: Niruch Panjontuk

22 December 2024	Toko Customs United (E)	3–0	Chachoengsao Hi-Tek (E)	Bang Phli, Samut Prakan
15:30 (UTC+7)	Noppaklao Damrongthai 59'; Takuto Hirao 62'; Kueanun Junumpai 89'	Report		Stadium: Stadium of Customs Department, Lad Krabang 54; Attendance: 152; Referee: Puttipong Saensarn; Assistant referees: Tanongsak Singhawapee, Monruedee Junmai; Fourth official: Kanakorn Teansawat

22 December 2024	Pluakdaeng United (E)	5–3	ACDC (E)	Pluak Daeng, Rayong
15:30 (UTC+7)	Warut Trongkratok 37', 45+1'; Teerapong Malai 50', 72', 83'	Report	Pokpong Ninnawvarat 17', 53'; Artit Sankla 87'	Stadium: CK Stadium; Referee: Booncharoen Phochai; Assistant referees: Apidet Rawangton, Narit Mungtoemklang; Fourth official: Pornthep Promsopa

22 December 2024	Saimit Kabin United (E)	4–3	Fleet (E)	Kabin Buri, Prachinburi
15:30 (UTC+7)	Wanthana Chaisawan 16'; Pakornpat Phasook 26'; Lionel Frank Touko Nzola 37' (o.g.); Thanat Tangnontanakorn 47'	Report; Highlight	Wanusanun Thana 45+1'; Jakrayut Vivatvanit 57'; Anuson Thaloengram 87'	Stadium: Nomklao Maharat Stadium; Attendance: 150; Referee: Nararit Srivorakul; Assistant referees: Siravich Konngam, Palathip Homwarn; Fourth official: Chaiyot Hapholdee

22 December 2024	Padriew City (E)	1–4	Bankhai United (E)	Mueang, Chachoengsao
15:30 (UTC+7)	Jeremiah Kegbe 37'	Report	Erivelto 49' (pen.), 73'; Jakree Pankam 61'; Natthikorn Yaprom 62'	Stadium: Chachoengsao Town Municipality Stadium; Attendance: 250; Referee: Theerapon Nakthong; Assistant referees: Kanathip Waithaisong, Chaiwat Rupsa-at; Fourth official: Anocha Praphatson

22 December 2024	Marines (E)	0–0	BFB Pattaya City (E)	Sattahip, Chonburi
15:30 (UTC+7)		Report		Stadium: Sattahip Navy Stadium; Attendance: 175; Referee: Niruch Panjontuk; Assistant referees: Watcharasak Intharak, Peeyaporn Worachaikueakun; Fourth official: Theerayut Radarit

==== Lower group ====
===== Central region =====
Pos	Team	Pld	W	D	L	GF	GA	GD	Pts	Qualification
1	Prime Bangkok	4	3	0	1	14	5	+9	9	Advance to round of 16
2	Kasem Bundit University	4	3	0	1	9	3	+6	9	Advance to round of 16
3	Lopburi City	4	2	2	0	10	4	+6	8	Advance to round of 16
4	North Bangkok University	4	2	2	0	7	1	+6	8	
5	Saraburi United	4	1	2	1	2	5	−3	5	
6	PTU Pathum Thani	4	1	1	2	2	6	−4	4	
7	Angthong	4	0	3	1	0	2	−2	3	
8	Chamchuri United	4	1	0	3	4	13	−9	3	
9	AUU Inter Bangkok	4	0	0	4	2	11	−9	0	

Source: Thai League
Rules for classification: 1) Points; 2) Goal difference; 3) Goals scored; 4) Away goals scored; 5) Wins; 6) Away wins.

30 November 2024	Prime Bangkok (C)	5–1	Chamchuri United (C)	Lak Si, Bangkok
15:30 (UTC+7)	Chawanwit Saelao 36', 90+4'; Kamin Kurakanok 59'; Lars William Kvist 71'; Sumana Salapphet 85'	Report; Highlight	Nanthaphong Thaisri 37'	Stadium: Boonyachinda Stadium; Attendance: 316; Referee: Nattaphak Sawasdee; Assistant referees: Supakorn Ruangrit, Arpaporn Thaisoda; Fourth official: Wilawan Rattanakhot

30 November 2024	Angthong (C)	0–0	Lopburi City (C)	Mueang, Ang Thong
17:00 (UTC+7)		Report		Stadium: Angthong Provincial Stadium; Attendance: 387; Referee: Pichit Thongjanmoon; Assistant referees: Ukrit Bung-or, Pornpumin Chaiyo; Fourth official: Titima Wongkhan

1 December 2024	Kasem Bundit University (C)	0–2	PTU Pathum Thani (C)	Min Buri, Bangkok
15:30 (UTC+7)		Report	Anooruk Suepsunthon 48'; Krailas Panyaroj 68'	Stadium: Stadium of Kasem Bundit University; Attendance: 321; Referee: Kattiya Saphu; Assistant referees: Bukhori Lehnuh, Kokiat Bunchoo; Fourth official: Watchara Wongkhan

1 December 2024	North Bangkok University (C)	4–1	AUU Inter Bangkok (C)	Thanyaburi, Pathum Thani
15:30 (UTC+7)	Veeraphong Aon-pean 16'; Supakit Rodmuang 19' (o.g.); Mohamed Kouadio 70'; Chinnawat Pasuk 90+5'	Report; Highlight	Kitichai Tunnoofaeb 24'	Stadium: Stadium of North Bangkok University; Attendance: 150; Referee: Dassakhon Hokla; Assistant referees: Haroot Himbenmut, Phattrawuth Sunsri; Fourth official: Theerapon Nonthakhamjan

7 December 2024	AUU Inter Bangkok (C)	0–3	Prime Bangkok (C)	Khlong Luang, Pathum Thani
15:30 (UTC+7)		Report	Sumana Salapphet 40'; Taechita Charoenyos 45+1' (o.g.); Wachirawit Tupmuang 90+2'	Stadium: Stadium of Bangkok University; Attendance: 120; Referee: Pornpumin Chaiyo; Assistant referees: Ritthiphong Phimpapan, Ukrit Bung-or; Fourth official: Muhammadadika Lomae

7 December 2024	Saraburi United (C)	1–5	Kasem Bundit University (C)	Mueang, Saraburi
15:30 (UTC+7)	Atikan Phanprahas 71'	Report	Ozobialu Chinedu Kennedy 18', 42', 85'; Supakrit Petpon 47'; Supawit Aingklub 90+4'	Stadium: Saraburi Stadium; Attendance: 50; Referee: Pichit Thongjanmoon; Assistant referees: Sujin Rodart, Supakorn Ruangrit; Fourth official: Sopon Boonlest

8 December 2024	PTU Pathum Thani (C)	0–0	Angthong (C)	Bang Sai, Phra Nakhon Si Ayutthaya
15:30 (UTC+7)		Report		Stadium: Ratchakram Stadium; Attendance: 120; Referee: Jatupol Kidklang; Assistant referees: Phattarapon Racha, Haroot Himbenmut; Fourth official: Fa-is Sohdalae

8 December 2024	Lopburi City (C)	0–0	North Bangkok University (C)	Mueang, Lopburi
18:00 (UTC+7)		Report		Stadium: Phra Ramesuan Stadium; Attendance: 170; Referee: Danai Yommool; Assistant referees: Panuwat Weawkum, Jakkapong Saothaisong; Fourth official: Pichet Chumcha

14 December 2024	Angthong (C)	0–0	Saraburi United (C)	Mueang, Ang Thong
17:00 (UTC+7)		Report		Stadium: Angthong Provincial Stadium; Attendance: 324; Referee: Danai Yommool; Assistant referees: Nanthawat Chobsuan, Phattarapon Racha; Fourth official: Kokiat Bunchoo

15 December 2024	North Bangkok University (C)	3–0	PTU Pathum Thani (C)	Thanyaburi, Pathum Thani
15:30 (UTC+7)	Seo Min-guk 38'; Veeraphong Aon-pean 54', 55'	Report; Highlight		Stadium: Stadium of North Bangkok University; Attendance: 120; Referee: Pornpumin Chaiyo; Assistant referees: Theerapon Nonthakhamjan, Pichet Chumcha; Fourth official: Pichit Thongjanmoon

15 December 2024	Prime Bangkok (C)	3–4	Lopburi City (C)	Lak Si, Bangkok
15:30 (UTC+7)	Chawanwit Saelao 4', 42'; Lars William Kvist 66'	Report	Alex Mermoz Djatche Nandje 14'; Noppakhun Yingbamrung 33'; Lucas Massaro Garcia Gama 45+3'; Matheus Felipe Oliveira de Moraes 86'	Stadium: Boonyachinda Stadium; Attendance: 345; Referee: Kattiya Saphu; Assistant referees: Padsakorn Jaihom, Sutthira Hempandan; Fourth official: Supiree Testhomya

15 December 2024	Chamchuri United (C)	2–1	AUU Inter Bangkok (C)	Pathum Wan, Bangkok
15:30 (UTC+7)	Watcharapong Wanthong 8'; Amad Heembenmad 39' (pen.)	Report	Kitichai Tunnoofaeb 14'	Stadium: Thephasadin Stadium; Attendance: 150; Referee: Sopon Boonlest; Assistant referees: Fa-is Sohdalae, Arpaporn Thaisoda; Fourth official: Bukhori Lehnuh

18 December 2024	AUU Inter Bangkok (C)	0–2	Kasem Bundit University (C)	Min Buri, Bangkok
15:30 (UTC+7)		Report	Ozobialu Chinedu Kennedy 27'; Chinonso Kingsley Thomas 90+3'	Stadium: Stadium of Kasem Bundit University; Attendance: 200; Referee: Pichit Thongjanmoon; Assistant referees: Sukree Kurteng, Weerawat Chantawad; Fourth official: Theerapat Insena

18 December 2024	Chamchuri United (C)	0–1	Saraburi United (C)	Pathum Wan, Bangkok
15:30 (UTC+7)		Report	Adoo Daniel Ikuukunee 65'	Stadium: Thephasadin Stadium; Attendance: 100; Referee: Aidsara Gaedthai; Assistant referees: Chakrit Siripong, Teerasak Kantharak; Fourth official: Bukhori Lehnuh

22 December 2024	Lopburi City (C)	6–1	Chamchuri United (C)	Mueang, Lopburi
15:30 (UTC+7)	Alex Mermoz Djatche Nandje 29', 62'; Matheus Felipe Oliveira de Moraes 36', 84'; Visitsak Chatree 39'; Teeramate Sappasomboon 53'	Report; Highlight	Nattawut Suksamran 90+1'	Stadium: Phra Ramesuan Stadium; Attendance: 125; Referee: Pichit Thongjanmoon; Assistant referees: Ukrit Bung-or, Tanakorn Leechaisathaporn; Fourth official: Wilawan Rattanakhot

22 December 2024	PTU Pathum Thani (C)	0–3	Prime Bangkok (C)	Bang Sai, Phra Nakhon Si Ayutthaya
15:30 (UTC+7)		Report	Chawanwit Saelao 21'; Lars William Kvist 45'; Jonathan Ermias Tesfay Habte 79' (pen.)	Stadium: Ratchakram Stadium; Attendance: 249; Referee: Danai Yommool; Assistant referees: Nanthawat Chobsuan, Supakorn Ruangrit; Fourth official: Opas Intaviset

22 December 2024	Kasem Bundit University (C)	2–0	Angthong (C)	Min Buri, Bangkok
15:30 (UTC+7)	Sundy Wongderree 45+1'; Sontaya Thotam 57'	Report		Stadium: Stadium of Kasem Bundit University; Attendance: 250; Referee: Anucha Pinamon; Assistant referees: Panuwat Weawkum, Niracha Sangprasit; Fourth official: Tibeth Longtree

22 December 2024	Saraburi United (C)	0–0	North Bangkok University (C)	Mueang, Saraburi
15:30 (UTC+7)		Report		Stadium: Saraburi Stadium; Attendance: 103; Referee: Jatupol Kidklang; Assistant referees: Muhammadadika Lomae, Jakkapong Saothaisong; Fourth official: Pornpumin Chaiyo

===== Western region =====
Pos	Team	Pld	W	D	L	GF	GA	GD	Pts	Qualification
1	Thonburi United	4	4	0	0	12	1	+11	12	Advance to round of 16
2	Samut Sakhon City	4	3	0	1	8	2	+6	9	Advance to round of 16
3	Thap Luang United	4	2	2	0	9	5	+4	8	Advance to round of 16
4	Maraleina	4	2	1	1	7	6	+1	7	
5	VRN Muangnont	4	2	0	2	4	3	+1	6	
6	Hua Hin City	4	1	1	2	3	10	−7	4	
7	Nonthaburi United	4	1	0	3	5	9	−4	3	
8	Rajpracha	4	0	2	2	5	7	−2	2	
9	Samut Songkhram City	4	0	0	4	1	11	−10	0	

Source: Thai League
Rules for classification: 1) Points; 2) Goal difference; 3) Goals scored; 4) Away goals scored; 5) Wins; 6) Away wins.

30 November 2024	Nonthaburi United (W)	3–4	Thap Luang United (W)	Bang Yai, Nonthaburi
15:30 (UTC+7)	Thanadon Yankaew 53'; Vorraseth Saichan 59'; Rachan Kunjina 66'	Report	Kittiwut Bouloy 19', 84'; Phuwanet Thongkhui 63'; Akaporn Aaj-konghan 90+4'	Stadium: Nonthaburi Stadium; Attendance: 113; Referee: Amnat Rattanapakdee; Assistant referees: Montree Sukcharoenprasoet, Den Bunyakittakun; Fourth official: Saravut Suksalee

30 November 2024	Hua Hin City (W)	2–1	Rajpracha (W)	Hua Hin, Prachuap Khiri Khan
16:30 (UTC+7)	Sutin Iamsa-ard 9', 49'	Report	Nattawut Namthip 58'	Stadium: Hua Hin Town Municipality Stadium; Attendance: 170; Referee: Winai Riangwong; Assistant referees: Narakorn Sapsuksai, Arna Rattanabumchum; Fourth official: Wutthinan Jampawai

1 December 2024	VRN Muangnont (W)	0–1	Thonburi United (W)	Mueang, Nonthaburi
15:30 (UTC+7)		Report	Bouda Henry Ismaël 24'	Stadium: Nonthaburi City Municipality Stadium; Attendance: 460; Referee: Alongkorn Feemuechang; Assistant referees: Narong Chaitong, Kunathorn Ketchantra; Fourth official: Jirayu Jonganuruk

1 December 2024	Samut Songkhram City (W)	1–2	Maraleina (W)	Mueang, Samut Songkhram
15:30 (UTC+7)	Thanawin Tanthatemi 19'	Report	Jirapat Klimkaew 15'; Jaranin Promchaisee 48'	Stadium: Samut Songkhram Stadium; Attendance: 150; Referee: Kittichai Huthip; Assistant referees: Kittichok Huthip, Nutsin Boonrod; Fourth official: Piyawat Rittimunee

7 December 2024	Maraleina (W)	2–0	Hua Hin City (W)	Mueang, Phetchaburi
17:00 (UTC+7)	Pitchayut Chaiyosaeng 20'; Jaranin Promchaisee 61'	Report		Stadium: Stadium of Phetchaburi Rajabhat University; Attendance: 70; Referee: Tawan Suriyawong; Assistant referees: Patcharapon Losomsup, Sarawut Nenrod; Fourth official: Tanutpon Sunyapluem

7 December 2024	Samut Sakhon City (W)	0–1	VRN Muangnont (W)	Mueang, Samut Sakhon
17:00 (UTC+7)		Report; Highlight	Chanayut Srisawat 33'	Stadium: Stadium of Thailand National Sports University, Samut Sakhon Campus; Attendance: 380; Referee: Jirayu Jonganuruk; Assistant referees: Pichaya Kasem, Surasing Sukoubaoong; Fourth official: Narakorn Sapsuksai

8 December 2024	Thonburi United (W)	2–1	Nonthaburi United (W)	Nong Khaem, Bangkok
15:30 (UTC+7)	Bouda Henry Ismaël 79', 82'	Report	Chumpol Seekhiao 90+3'	Stadium: Thonburi Stadium; Attendance: 470; Referee: Wutthinan Jampawai; Assistant referees: Thanapong Chunhakam, Witsanu Phothisuwan; Fourth official: Ronnarong Kiratijumraen

8 December 2024	Thap Luang United (W)	3–0	Samut Songkhram City (W)	Kamphaeng Saen, Nakhon Pathom
18:00 (UTC+7)	Phuwanet Thongkhui 34', 60'; Kittiwut Bouloy 54'	Report; Highlight		Stadium: Stadium of Kasetsart University, Kamphaeng Saen Campus; Attendance: 207; Referee: Piyawat Rittimunee; Assistant referees: Pongsakorn Choosri, Nattasit Bunjan; Fourth official: Teerayut Chantakun

14 December 2024	Rajpracha (W)	2–2	Maraleina (W)	Mueang, Nonthaburi
15:30 (UTC+7)	Thitiwut Ngamprom 31'; Nattawut Namthip 90+2'	Report; Highlight	Kritsanai Panesana 10'; Rachata Prachasin 56'	Stadium: Nonthaburi City Municipality Stadium; Attendance: 86; Referee: Worapon Sanjan; Assistant referees: Den Bunyakittakun, Thanaphon Chaowanon; Fourth official: Weeraphong Chaiyasuk

14 December 2024	Hua Hin City (W)	1–1	Thap Luang United (W)	Hua Hin, Prachuap Khiri Khan
16:30 (UTC+7)	Songkran Pungnoy 82'	Report	Phuwanet Thongkhui 55'	Stadium: Hua Hin Town Municipality Stadium; Attendance: 150; Referee: Alongkorn Feemuechang; Assistant referees: Yanin Nanthakampira, Nutsin Boonrod; Fourth official: Ronnarong Kiratijumraen

15 December 2024	Nonthaburi United (W)	0–3	Samut Sakhon City (W)	Bang Yai, Nonthaburi
15:30 (UTC+7)		Report; Highlight	Prasit Pattanatanawisut 6'; Felipe Vasconcelos Paim 22', 90+4'	Stadium: Nonthaburi Stadium; Attendance: 195; Referee: Saravut Suksalee; Assistant referees: Pichaya Kasem, Patcharapon Losomsup; Fourth official: Surasing Sukoubaoong

15 December 2024	Samut Songkhram City (W)	0–3	Thonburi United (W)	Mueang, Samut Songkhram
15:30 (UTC+7)		Report	Kittipong Seanphong 30'; Emerson da Silva Tavares 60'; Bouda Henry Ismaël 63' (pen.)	Stadium: Samut Songkhram Stadium; Attendance: 200; Referee: Amnat Rattanapakdee; Assistant referees: Narong Chaitong, Atthaphon Somporncharoen; Fourth official: Teerayut Chantakun

18 December 2024	Rajpracha (W)	1–2	Samut Sakhon City (W)	Bang Yai, Nonthaburi
16:00 (UTC+7)	Chaimongkol Botnok 57' (o.g.)	Report; Highlight	Prasit Pattanatanawisut 21'; Jedsadakorn Kowngam 88'	Stadium: Nonthaburi Stadium; Attendance: 138; Referee: Saravut Suksalee; Assistant referees: Narakorn Sapsuksai, Arna Rattanabumchum; Fourth official: Sarawut Nenrod

18 December 2024	Maraleina (W)	1–3	VRN Muangnont (W)	Mueang, Phetchaburi
17:00 (UTC+7)	Pitchayut Chaiyosaeng 56'	Report	Jakapat Nuchkasae 14'; Tawat Boonsoi 29'; Pitchayut Chaiyosaeng 42' (o.g.)	Stadium: Stadium of Phetchaburi Rajabhat University; Attendance: 150; Referee: Winai Riangwong; Assistant referees: Kunathorn Ketchantra, Surasing Sukoubaoong; Fourth official: Alongkorn Feemuechang

21 December 2024	Thap Luang United (W)	1–1	Rajpracha (W)	Kamphaeng Saen, Nakhon Pathom
15:30 (UTC+7)	Suraphod Pankhruea 84'	Report	Poppol Zeemadee 8'	Stadium: Stadium of Kasetsart University, Kamphaeng Saen Campus; Attendance: 140; Referee: Pawara Seejen; Assistant referees: Watthana Chonchanakul, Sumate Peasiri; Fourth official: Amnat Rattanapakdee

21 December 2024	Thonburi United (W)	6–0	Hua Hin City (W)	Nong Khaem, Bangkok
15:30 (UTC+7)	Bouda Henry Ismaël 25', 40'; Kongpop Sroirak 64'; Phinit Phutong 78'; Thanawat Srilasak 90'; Emerson da Silva Tavares 90+2'	Report		Stadium: Thonburi Stadium; Attendance: 320; Referee: Noppadet Mangngam; Assistant referees: Chaowalit Poonprasit, Kunathorn Ketchantra; Fourth official: Jirayu Jonganuruk

21 December 2024	VRN Muangnont (W)	0–1	Nonthaburi United (W)	Mueang, Nonthaburi
15:30 (UTC+7)		Report	Kamin Muktharakosa 28'	Stadium: Nonthaburi City Municipality Stadium; Attendance: 150; Referee: Alongkorn Feemuechang; Assistant referees: Natthaphon Mala, Suriya Lee-intr; Fourth official: Winai Riangwong

21 December 2024	Samut Sakhon City (W)	3–0	Samut Songkhram City (W)	Mueang, Samut Sakhon
15:30 (UTC+7)	Prasit Pattanatanawisut 3' (pen.), 35'; Arnon Prasongporn 75'	Report; Highlight		Stadium: Stadium of Thailand National Sports University, Samut Sakhon Campus; Attendance: 350; Referee: Thapakorn Thongkon; Assistant referees: Phubes Lekpha, Binla Preeda; Fourth official: Weeraphong Chaiyasuk

===== Southern region =====
Pos	Team	Pld	W	D	L	GF	GA	GD	Pts	Qualification
1	Phatthalung	4	3	0	1	10	8	+2	9	Advance to round of 16
2	Songkhla	4	2	2	0	4	1	+3	8	Advance to round of 16
3	Muang Trang United	4	2	2	0	7	5	+2	8	
4	Satun	4	2	1	1	4	3	+1	7	
5	PSU Surat Thani City	4	1	1	2	3	4	−1	4	
6	Pattani	4	0	2	2	3	5	−2	2	
7	Krabi	4	0	0	4	2	7	−5	0	

Source: Thai League
Rules for classification: 1) Points; 2) Goal difference; 3) Goals scored; 4) Away goals scored; 5) Wins; 6) Away wins.

30 November 2024	Krabi (S)	1–2	Muang Trang United (S)	Mueang, Krabi
15:30 (UTC+7)	Arthitriw Songsayorm 90+5'	Report	Diogo Pereira 58'; Aphisit Nunthong 89'	Stadium: Krabi Provincial Stadium; Attendance: 200; Referee: Nattawut Sangpan; Assistant referees: Metawin Chujit, Winai Jansang; Fourth official: Pissanusak Sriyai

7 December 2024	Songkhla (S)	2–0	Krabi (S)	Mueang, Songkhla
17:30 (UTC+7)	Abdulhafis Nibu 73'; Anwa A-leemama 79'	Report		Stadium: Tinsulanon Stadium; Attendance: 243; Referee: Iffan Phanwang; Assistant referees: Kiadtisak Waianasen, Satira Yunyongkait; Fourth official: Farid Baenak

7 December 2024	Muang Trang United (S)	1–1	Satun (S)	Huai Yot, Trang
18:00 (UTC+7)	Flodyn Ruchelvy Ulrich Baloki 10'	Report	Arnuh Wongwaen 30'	Stadium: Muang Trang Stadium; Attendance: 892; Referee: Nirut Suetrong; Assistant referees: Mayunai Kueteh, Ameen Puteh; Fourth official: Montree Yeereem

11 December 2024	PSU Surat Thani City (S)	0–0	Pattani (S)	Mueang, Surat Thani
15:30 (UTC+7)		Report		Stadium: Stadium of Prince of Songkla University, Surat Thani Campus; Attendance: 100; Referee: Watcharin Nootong; Assistant referees: Sarayut Phaewsaart, U-ten Pankaew; Fourth official: Wacharawit Suwanraksa

14 December 2024	Krabi (S)	0–1	PSU Surat Thani City (S)	Mueang, Krabi
15:30 (UTC+7)		Report	Josimar Tiago da Silva 38'	Stadium: Krabi Provincial Stadium; Attendance: 32; Referee: Anon Lohlor; Assistant referees: Sakda Madmanang, Abdulloh Benhayimayo; Fourth official: Wilat Arunrat

14 December 2024	Pattani (S)	3–4	Phatthalung (S)	Mueang, Pattani
16:00 (UTC+7)	Marlon Henrique Brandão da Silva 22'; Muhammadnasay Kolaeh 38'; Felipe Nunes 52'	Report	Lucas Gaudencio Moraes 32', 45+3', 84', 86'	Stadium: Pattani PAO. Stadium; Attendance: 1,293; Referee: Nakarin Kanantai; Assistant referees: Hadis Kaesaman, Thanaphon Buraphong; Fourth official: Wisarut Damthaklong

14 December 2024	Satun (S)	0–1	Songkhla (S)	Mueang, Satun
16:00 (UTC+7)		Report	Pornthep Heemla 70'	Stadium: Satun PAO. Stadium; Attendance: 2,962; Referee: Anwa Hayiyusoh; Assistant referees: Heesham Doloh, Muhammadsaiyukee Seena; Fourth official: Abdulrohim Sitiloh

18 December 2024	Satun (S)	1–0	Pattani (S)	Mueang, Satun
16:00 (UTC+7)	Monchit Wanna 38'	Report		Stadium: Satun PAO. Stadium; Attendance: 1,941; Referee: Sarwan Karengsana; Assistant referees: Phipat Kongchamnan, Firhan Useng; Fourth official: Yod Damhai

18 December 2024	Muang Trang United (S)	3–2	Phatthalung (S)	Huai Yot, Trang
18:00 (UTC+7)	Diogo Pereira 44', 89' (pen.); Arnon Panmeethong 55'	Report	Lucas Gaudencio Moraes 27'; Pablo Matías Stupiski 62' (pen.)	Stadium: Muang Trang Stadium; Attendance: 1,200; Referee: Tiwakorn Sawangpong; Assistant referees: Pumipat Arwutpet, Wan-asmee Waesamaeh; Fourth official: Artit Srinoy

22 December 2024	Songkhla (S)	1–1	Muang Trang United (S)	Mueang, Songkhla
15:30 (UTC+7)	Kridsada Limseeput 29' (o.g.)	Report	Diogo Pereira 45+1' (pen.)	Stadium: Tinsulanon Stadium; Attendance: 232; Referee: Montree Yeereem; Assistant referees: Winai Jansang, Kiadtisak Waianasen; Fourth official: Pissanusak Sriyai

22 December 2024	Phatthalung (S)	2–1	Krabi (S)	Mueang, Phatthalung
15:30 (UTC+7)	Lucas Gaudencio Moraes 75'; Adel Gafaiti 88'	Report	Sirisak Promduang 90+2'	Stadium: Phatthalung PAO. Stadium; Attendance: 925; Referee: Aibroheem Sama; Assistant referees: Abdulloh Reebu, Sakri Mahama; Fourth official: Anas Poheng

22 December 2024	PSU Surat Thani City (S)	1–2	Satun (S)	Mueang, Surat Thani
15:30 (UTC+7)	Sinchai Bumpen 60'	Report; Highlight	Porncha Rodnakkaret 9'; Thapkhon Markmee 15'	Stadium: Stadium of Prince of Songkla University, Surat Thani Campus; Attendance: 500; Referee: Wichai Pannil; Assistant referees: Waranyu Janhor, Chanatip Chanpen; Fourth official: Nattapon Ninlawan

25 December 2024	Phatthalung (S)	2–1	PSU Surat Thani City (S)	Mueang, Phatthalung
18:00 (UTC+7)	Pablo Matías Stupiski 59'; Decha Hwattaen 66'	Report	Phongphan Srikate 89'	Stadium: Phatthalung PAO. Stadium; Attendance: 1,258; Referee: Mayara Day; Assistant referees: Fadeen Adae, Bunya Mahankrit; Fourth official: Aibroheem Sama

26 December 2024	Pattani (S)	0–0	Songkhla (S)	Mueang, Pattani
16:00 (UTC+7)		Report		Stadium: Pattani PAO. Stadium; Attendance: 1,653; Referee: Ameen Lorma; Assistant referees: Mayunai Kueteh, Alan Yakok; Fourth official: Watcharin Nootong

==== Ranking of third-placed clubs ====
===== Upper group =====
Pos	Regions	Team	Pld	W	D	L	GF	GA	GD	Pts	Qualification
1	Eastern	Saimit Kabin United	4	3	1	0	10	5	+5	10	Advance to round of 16
2	Northeastern	Muang Loei United	4	2	1	1	7	5	+2	7	Advance to round of 16
3	Northern	TPF Uttaradit	4	2	1	1	6	4	+2	7	

Source: Thai League
Rules for classification: 1) Points; 2) Goal difference; 3) Goals scored; 4) Away goals scored; 5) Wins; 6) Away wins.

===== Lower group =====
Pos	Regions	Team	Pld	W	D	L	GF	GA	GD	Pts	Qualification
1	Central	Lopburi City	4	2	2	0	10	4	+6	8	Advance to round of 16
2	Western	Thap Luang United	4	2	2	0	9	5	+4	8	Advance to round of 16
3	Southern	Muang Trang United	4	2	2	0	7	5	+2	8	

Source: Thai League
Rules for classification: 1) Points; 2) Goal difference; 3) Goals scored; 4) Away goals scored; 5) Wins; 6) Away wins.

=== Knockout phase ===
The knockout phase consists of 16 clubs: the 12 automatic qualifiers from the league phase and the four best third-placed clubs. The phase adopts a single-elimination format, starting from the Round of 16, followed by the quarter-finals, semi-finals, and the final. All matches in the knockout phase are single-legged except for the semi-finals, which are played over two legs. In the event of a tie in the semi-finals, the away goals rule applies, followed by penalty shootouts if necessary. The final is played as a single-leg match to determine the tournament champion.

Club	Qualified as
Upper group
Northern Nakhon Mae Sot United	Northern region winners
Udon United	Northeastern region winners
Navy	Eastern region winners
Phitsanulok	Northern region runners-up
Khon Kaen	Northeastern region runners-up
Pluakdaeng United	Eastern region runners-up
Saimit Kabin United	Best third-placed
Muang Loei United	2nd best third-placed
Lower group
Prime Bangkok	Central region winners
Thonburi United	Western region winners
Phatthalung	Southern region winners
Kasem Bundit University	Central region runners-up
Samut Sakhon City	Western region runners-up
Songkhla	Southern region runners-up
Lopburi City	Best third-placed
Thap Luang United	2nd best third-placed

==== Round of 16 ====
The round of 16 features 2 clubs from the Northern region, 3 clubs from the Northeastern region, 3 clubs from the Eastern region, 3 clubs from the Central region, 3 clubs from the Western region, and 2 clubs from the Southern region. The draw for this round took place on 23 December 2024. 17 goals were scored in this round.

Upper group

4 January 2025	Saimit Kabin United (E)	0–0 (a.e.t.) (7–6 p)	Udon United (NE)	Kabin Buri, Prachinburi
15:00 (UTC+7)		Report		Stadium: Nomklao Maharat Stadium; Attendance: 85; Referee: Nararit Srivorakul; Assistant referees: Adisai Pongnairat, Komsan Wantavee; Fourth official: Puttipong Saensarn
	Penalties
	Suwat Yadee (penalty scored); Wasan Mala (penalty missed); Guilherme Moreira (penalty scored); Noppanai Charoenrung (penalty scored); Natthachai Rakkamnoed (penalty scored); Thanat Tangnontanakorn (penalty scored); Thanachot Chomkhunthod (penalty scored); Ademola Sodiq Adeyemi (penalty scored)		(penalty scored) Thawatchai Aocharod; (penalty scored) Luiz Júnior; (penalty scored) Nuttawut Khamrin; (penalty scored) Surasak Somrat; (penalty missed) Poltawat Janntasree; (penalty scored) Sakda Noppakdee; (penalty scored) Nirun Chaokhao; (penalty missed) Thanathip Paengwong

4 January 2025	Navy (E)	1–1 (a.e.t.) (6–7 p)	Khon Kaen (NE)	Sattahip, Chonburi
18:00 (UTC+7)	Panigazzi Matías Ignacio 90+6'	Report	João Guimarães 51'	Stadium: Sattahip Navy Stadium; Referee: Booncharoen Phochai; Assistant referees: Wararit Suwanjira, Peeyaporn Worachaikueakun; Fourth official: Panya Nawasimainam
	Penalties
	Luan Santos (penalty scored); Thanathorn Chanphet (penalty scored); Panigazzi Matías Ignacio (penalty missed); Sitthisak Inyai (penalty scored); Wanmai Settanant (penalty scored); Thanphisit Hempandan (penalty scored); Baramee Limwattana (penalty scored); Thatchapol Chai-yan (penalty missed)		(penalty scored) Phommin Kaeosanga; (penalty scored) Anawat Pasotiyang; (penalty scored) Nutdanai Ketpaen; (penalty missed) Tadsawat Sriwilot; (penalty scored) Charin Boodhad; (penalty scored) Ratthaphon Phoopharot; (penalty scored) Aphiwat Mitrak; (penalty scored) Sarawin Saengra

5 January 2025	Northern Nakhon Mae Sot United (N)	1–2 (a.e.t.)	Pluakdaeng United (E)	Mae Sot, Tak
15:00 (UTC+7)	Cedrick Platini Kaham 90'	Report	Teerapong Malai 34'; Pipattanapong Buntom 119'	Stadium: Five Border Districts Stadium; Attendance: 138; Referee: Chookiat Boonchoo; Assistant referees: Pitak Lungyu, Sumetee Khaokaew; Fourth official: Anurak Sankaew

5 January 2025	Muang Loei United (NE)	0–1	Phitsanulok (N)	Mueang, Loei
18:00 (UTC+7)		Report; Highlight	Natthawut Nueamai 90+5'	Stadium: Stadium of Loei Rajabhat University; Attendance: 260; Referee: Anan Keawmuangkhun; Assistant referees: Yodtawee Ridsri, Mongkol Uthainang; Fourth official: Jakkrit Pratum

Lower group

4 January 2025	Prime Bangkok (C)	1–2	Thonburi United (W)	Lak Si, Bangkok
15:00 (UTC+7)	Lars William Kvist 78'	Report; Highlight	Piyaphong Phrueksupee 57'; Kittipong Seanphong 90'	Stadium: Boonyachinda Stadium; Attendance: 270; Referee: Pichit Thongjanmoon; Assistant referees: Tibeth Longtree, Pornpumin Chaiyo; Fourth official: Jasada Tongkam

4 January 2025	Lopburi City (C)	2–0	Thap Luang United (W)	Mueang, Lopburi
18:00 (UTC+7)	Alex Mermoz Djatche Nandje 2', 41'	Report		Stadium: Phra Ramesuan Stadium; Attendance: 300; Referee: Danai Yommool; Assistant referees: Ritthiphong Phimpapan, Tanakorn Leechaisathaporn; Fourth official: Surathat Sanont

5 January 2025	Samut Sakhon City (W)	4–1	Phatthalung (S)	Mueang, Samut Sakhon
17:00 (UTC+7)	Felipe Vasconcelos Paim 38' (pen.), 48', 62'; Patiphan Pinsermsootsri 45'	Report; Highlight	Pablo Matías Stupiski 88'	Stadium: Stadium of Thailand National Sports University, Samut Sakhon Campus; Attendance: 760; Referee: Wutthinan Jampawai; Assistant referees: Kittichok Huthip, Pichaya Kasem; Fourth official: Patcharapon Losomsup

5 January 2025	Songkhla (S)	1–0	Kasem Bundit University (C)	Mueang, Songkhla
18:00 (UTC+7)	Anwa A-leemama 60'	Report		Stadium: Tinsulanon Stadium; Attendance: 345; Referee: Pissanusak Sriyai; Assistant referees: Winai Jansang, Mayunai Kueteh; Fourth official: Sarwan Karengsana

==== Quarter-finals ====
The quarter-finals consist of 8 clubs, all advancing as winners from the Round of 16. These clubs include 1 club from the Northern region, 1 club from the Northeastern region, 2 clubs from the Eastern region, 1 club from the Central region, 2 clubs from the Western region, and 1 club from the Southern region. The draw for this round took place on 23 December 2024. 19 goals were scored in this round.

11 January 2025	Samut Sakhon City (W)	6–4	Pluakdaeng United (E)	Mueang, Samut Sakhon
17:00 (UTC+7)	Burnel Okana-Stazi 1'; Ratchapol Nawanno 43'; Felipe Vasconcelos Paim 48'; Prasit Pattanatanawisut 58'; Patiphan Pinsermsootsri 73'; Warayut Klomnak 90'	Report; Highlight	Amondeth Kittipornpracha 24', 85'; Teerapong Malai 77'; Muddasir Chedeng 86'	Stadium: Stadium of Thailand National Sports University, Samut Sakhon Campus; Attendance: 542; Referee: Saravut Suksalee; Assistant referees: Narakorn Sapsuksai, Arna Rattanabumchum; Fourth official: Surasing Sukoubaoong

11 January 2025	Phitsanulok (N)	2–1	Lopburi City (C)	Mueang, Phitsanulok
18:00 (UTC+7)	Wanchana Rattana 82', 90+1'	Report	Matheus Felipe Oliveira de Moraes 6'	Stadium: Phitsanulok PAO. Stadium; Attendance: 1,765; Referee: Chirawat Chomphoosee; Assistant referees: Suwit Kongtongnok, Michai Changhirai; Fourth official: Chookiat Boonchoo

12 January 2025	Saimit Kabin United (E)	1–2	Thonburi United (W)	Kabin Buri, Prachinburi
15:00 (UTC+7)	Wanthana Chaisawan 47'	Report; Highlight	Suradet Klankham 6'; Narathip Kruearanya 37'	Stadium: Nomklao Maharat Stadium; Attendance: 237; Referee: Niruch Panjontuk; Assistant referees: Kanathip Waithaisong, Tanongsak Singhawapee; Fourth official: Booncharoen Phochai

12 January 2025	Songkhla (S)	2–1 (a.e.t.)	Khon Kaen (NE)	Mueang, Songkhla
18:00 (UTC+7)	Sukree Etae 102', 114'	Report; Highlight	João Guimarães 108'	Stadium: Tinsulanon Stadium; Attendance: 354; Referee: Mayara Day; Assistant referees: Ameen Puteh, Abdulloh Benhayimayo; Fourth official: Anwa Hayiyusoh

==== Semi-finals ====
The semi-finals consist of 4 clubs, all advancing as winners from the quarter-finals. These clubs include 1 club from the Northern region, 2 clubs from the Western region, and 1 club from the Southern region. The draw for this round took place on 16 January 2025. 6 goals were scored in this round.

Team 1	Agg.	Team 2	1st leg	2nd leg
Samut Sakhon City (W)	1–2	Thonburi United (W)	0–1	1–1
Songkhla (S)	2–1	Phitsanulok (N)	2–1	0–0

1st leg

12 February 2025	Samut Sakhon City (W)	0–1	Thonburi United (W)	Mueang, Samut Sakhon
17:00 (UTC+7)		Report	Yannatat Wannatong 90+4'	Stadium: Stadium of Thailand National Sports University, Samut Sakhon Campus; Attendance: 520; Referee: Warintron Sassadee; Assistant referees: Komsan Kampan, Natthaphon Mala; Fourth official: Kittichai Huthip

12 February 2025	Songkhla (S)	2–1	Phitsanulok (N)	Mueang, Songkhla
18:00 (UTC+7)	Jhonatan Bernardo 11'; Ramiro Lizaso 52'	Report	Nattaphat Noynonmueng 43'	Stadium: Tinsulanon Stadium; Attendance: 335; Referee: Satchukorn Saenchu; Assistant referees: Kunathorn Ketchantra, Yanin Nanthakampira; Fourth official: Surasing Sukoubaoong

2nd leg

5 March 2025	Thonburi United (W)	1–1	Samut Sakhon City (W)	Nong Khaem, Bangkok
15:00 (UTC+7)	Piyaphong Phrueksupee 18'	Report; Highlight	Burnel Okana-Stazi 80'	Stadium: Thonburi Stadium; Attendance: 873; Referee: Winat Phophat; Assistant referees: Chotrawee Tongduang, Binla Preeda; Fourth official: Kriangkrai Thiphanunjarukorn

5 March 2025	Phitsanulok (N)	0–0	Songkhla (S)	Mueang, Phitsanulok
18:00 (UTC+7)		Report		Stadium: Phitsanulok PAO. Stadium; Attendance: 579; Referee: Wiwat Jumpaoon; Assistant referees: Tanate Chuchuen, Songrit Trakulchai; Fourth official: Panumas Phansamo

==== Final ====
The final consists of 2 clubs, all advancing as winners from the semi-finals. These clubs include one from the Western region and one from the Southern region. No goals were scored in this round.

19 April 2025	Thonburi United (W)	0–0 (a.e.t.) (5–4 p)	Songkhla (S)	Thanyaburi, Pathum Thani
18:00 (UTC+7)		Report; Highlight		Stadium: BG Stadium; Attendance: 2,327; Referee: Noppadet Mangngam; Assistant referees: Rawut Nakarit, Apichit Nophuan; Fourth official: Thapakorn Thongkon
	Penalties
	Kittipong Seangbong (penalty scored); Sirakorn Pimbaotham (penalty scored); Phinit Phuthong (penalty missed); Yannatat Wannatong (penalty scored); Sarawut Bunrod (penalty scored); Kongpop Sroirak (penalty scored)		(penalty scored) Pornthep Heemla; (penalty scored) Suttipong Yaifai; (penalty scored) Nobparut Raksachum; (penalty missed) Chanatip Krainara; (penalty scored) Sanan Samala; (penalty missed) Sukree Etae

== Tournament statistics ==
=== Top goalscorers ===
Rank	Player	Club	Goals
1	(Brazil) Lucas Gaudencio Moraes	Phatthalung	6
1	(Thailand) Teerapong Malai	Pluakdaeng United	6
1	(Brazil) Felipe Vasconcelos Paim	Samut Sakhon City	6
1	(Ivory Coast) Bouda Henry Ismaël	Thonburi United	6
5	(Cameroon) Alex Mermoz Djatche Nandje	Lopburi City	5
5	(Argentina) Panigazzi Matías Ignacio	Navy	5
5	(Thailand) Thanphisit Hempandan	Navy	5
5	(Thailand) Prasit Pattanatanawisut	Samut Sakhon City	5

=== Hat-tricks ===
Player	For	Against	Result	Date	Round
(Nigeria) Ozobialu Chinedu Kennedy	Kasem Bundit University (C)	Saraburi United (C)	5–1 (A)	7 December 2024	League phase Central region
(Nigeria) Ekene Victor Azike	Phitsanulok (N)	Maejo United (N)	3–0 (H)	7 December 2024	League phase Northern region
(Thailand) Kueanun Junumpai	Toko Customs United (E)	ACDC (E)	6–4 (H)	8 December 2024	League phase Eastern region
(Brazil) Lucas Gaudencio Moraes^{4}	Phatthalung (S)	Pattani (S)	4–3 (A)	14 December 2024	League phase Southern region
(Argentina) Panigazzi Matías Ignacio	Navy (E)	Marines (E)	5–0 (H)	15 December 2024	League phase Eastern region
(Thailand) Aphiwat Mitrak	Khon Kaen (NE)	Surin Khong Chee Mool (NE)	9–1 (A)	18 December 2024	League phase Northeastern region
(Thailand) Teerapong Malai	Pluakdaeng United (E)	ACDC (E)	5–3 (H)	22 December 2024	League phase Eastern region
(Brazil) Felipe Vasconcelos Paim	Samut Sakhon City (W)	Phatthalung (S)	4–1 (H)	5 January 2025	Round of 16

Notes: ^{4} = Player scored 4 goals; (H) = Home team; (A) = Away team

== See also ==
- 2024–25 Thai League 1
- 2024–25 Thai League 2
- 2024–25 Thai League 3
- 2024–25 Thai League 3 Northern Region
- 2024–25 Thai League 3 Northeastern Region
- 2024–25 Thai League 3 Eastern Region
- 2024–25 Thai League 3 Western Region
- 2024–25 Thai League 3 Southern Region
- 2024–25 Thai League 3 Central Region
- 2024–25 Thai FA Cup
- 2024–25 Thai League Cup
