= 2025 Thai League 3 Cup final =

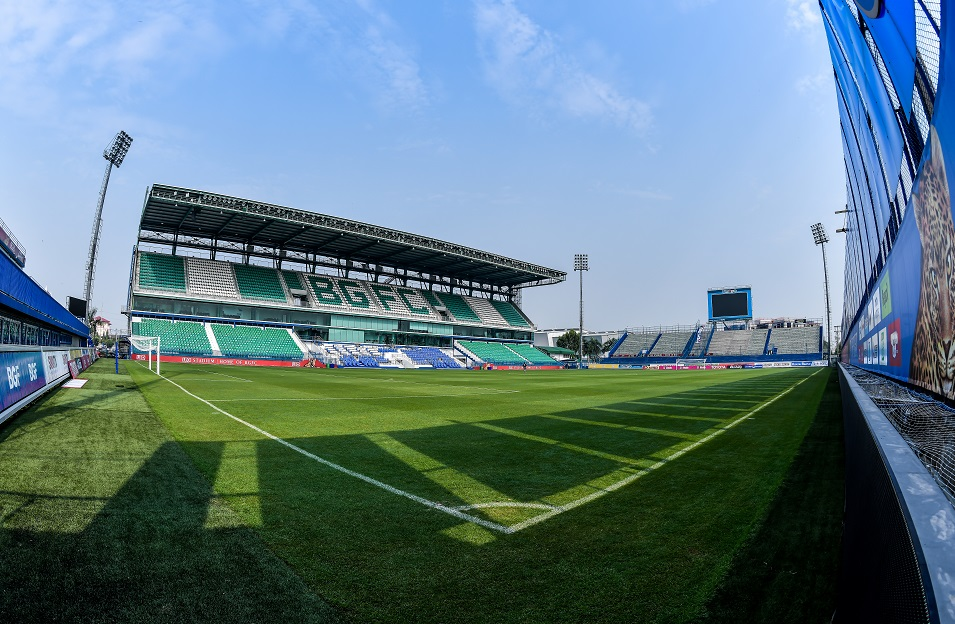
- The match took place at BG Stadium.
- Event: 2024–25 Thai League 3 Cup
Thonburi United	Songkhla
0	0
- After extra time Thonburi United won 5–4 on penalties
- Date: 19 April 2025
- Venue: BG Stadium, Thanyaburi, Pathum Thani
- Man of the Match: Sirakorn Pimbaotham (Thonburi United)
- Referee: Noppadet Mangngam (Thailand)
- Weather: Fair; 30 °C (86 °F) humidity 72%

The 2025 Thai League 3 Cup final was the culmination of the 2024–25 Thai League 3 Cup, the second edition of Thailand's knockout football competition organized by the Football Association of Thailand (FA Thailand). The final occurred at BG Stadium in Pathum Thani, Thailand, on 19 April 2025, featuring Thonburi United and Songkhla. This final also marked the first time that the Video assistant referee (VAR) system was implemented in the competition, adding an extra layer of officiating precision to the decisive match.

Thonburi United, despite being based in Bangkok, Thailand's capital, competed in the Western region of the 2024–25 Thai League 3 due to the league's regional balancing system. Their journey to the final was a testament to their resilience and tactical discipline. Songkhla, representing the Southern region, carried the pride of its namesake province into the decisive match, seeking to claim national recognition. This final brought together two teams from distinct regional backgrounds, each vying for the prestigious title and a place in the tournament's history.

== Route to the final ==
Note: In all results below, the score of the finalist is given first (H: home; A: away; N: Clubs from Northern region; C: Clubs from Central region; NE: Clubs from Northeastern region; E: Clubs from Eastern region; W: Clubs from Western region; S: Clubs from Southern region.

Thonburi United (W)				Round	Songkhla (S)			
Opponent	Result			League phase	Opponent	Result		
VRN Muangnont (W)	1–0 (A)			Matchday 1	Krabi (S)	2–0 (H)		
Nonthaburi United (W)	2–1 (H)			Matchday 2	Satun (S)	1–0 (A)		
Samut Songkhram City (W)	3–0 (A)			Matchday 3	Muang Trang United (S)	1–1 (H)		
Hua Hin City (W)	6–0 (H)			Matchday 4	Pattani (S)	0–0 (A)		
Western region winners: Pos / Team / Pld / Pts; 1 / Thonburi United / 4 / 12; 2 / Samut Sakhon City / 4 / 9; 3 / Thap Luang United / 4 / 8; 4 / Maraleina / 4 / 7; 5 / VRN Muangnont / 4 / 6; Source: Thai League				Final standings	Southern region runners-up: Pos / Team / Pld / Pts; 1 / Phatthalung / 4 / 9; 2 / Songkhla / 4 / 8; 3 / Muang Trang United / 4 / 8; 4 / Satun / 4 / 7; 5 / PSU Surat Thani City / 4 / 4; Source: Thai League			
Opponent	Result			Knockout 1 leg	Opponent	Result		
Prime Bangkok (C)	2–1 (A)			Round of 16	Kasem Bundit University (C)	1–0 (H)		
Saimit Kabin United (E)	2–1 (A)			Quarter-finals	Khon Kaen (NE)	2–1 (a.e.t.) (H)		
Opponent	Agg.	1st leg	2nd leg	Knockout 2 legs	Opponent	Agg.	1st leg	2nd leg
Samut Sakhon City (W)	2–1	1–0 (A)	1–1 (H)	Semi-finals	Phitsanulok (N)	2–1	2–1 (H)	0–0 (A)

=== Thonburi United ===
Thonburi United qualified for the knockout stage of the 2024–25 Thai League 3 Cup as the top team from the Western region. Despite being based in Bangkok, the club competed in the Western region due to the league's regional balancing system. They finished the league phase with a perfect record, winning all four matches and securing 12 points. In the league phase, Thonburi United began their campaign with a 1–0 away victory against VRN Muangnont, courtesy of a goal from Bouda Henry Ismaël. In their second match, they secured a 2–1 home win over Nonthaburi United, with both goals scored by Ismaël. They continued their dominance with a convincing 3–0 away win against Samut Songkhram City, where Kittipong Seanphong, Emerson da Silva Tavares, and Ismaël (via a penalty) found the net. Their final group-stage match was an emphatic 6–0 home victory against Hua Hin City, featuring goals from Ismaël (2), Kongpop Sroirak, Phinit Phutong, Thanawat Srilasak, and Tavares.

Advancing as the first seed from the Western region, Thonburi United entered the knockout stage in the round of 16, where they faced Prime Bangkok from the Central region. They secured a 2–1 away victory, with goals from Piyaphong Phrueksupee and Kittipong Seanphong. In the quarter-finals, Thonburi United traveled to face Saimit Kabin United from the Eastern region. They emerged victorious with a 2–1 win, thanks to goals from Suradet Klankham and Narathip Kruearanya. The semi-finals were played over two legs against fellow Western region side Samut Sakhon City. Thonburi United secured a crucial 1–0 away win in the first leg, with Yannatat Wannatong scoring the decisive goal. In the second leg, they drew 1–1 at home, with Phrueksupee finding the net. The aggregate score of 2–1 sent Thonburi United to the final.

=== Songkhla ===
Songkhla advanced to the knockout stage of the 2024–25 Thai League 3 Cup by finishing second in the Southern region, securing 8 points from two wins and two draws. Their league phase campaign began with a 2–0 home victory over Krabi, with goals from Abdulhafis Nibu and Anwa A-leemama. They followed up with a 1–0 away win against Satun, with the lone goal scored by Pornthep Heemla. In their third match, they played to a 1–1 home draw against Muang Trang United, with the equalizer coming from an own goal by Kridsada Limseeput. They concluded the group stage with a goalless draw away to Pattani.

Entering the knockout stage, Songkhla hosted Kasem Bundit University from the Central region in the round of 16, securing a narrow 1–0 victory through a goal from A-leemama. In the quarter-finals, Songkhla faced Khon Kaen from the Northeastern region. After a goalless draw in regular time, the match went into extra time, where Songkhla emerged with a 2–1 victory, thanks to two crucial goals from Sukree Etae. In the semi-finals, Songkhla played a two-legged tie against Phitsanulok from the Northern region. In the first leg at home, they won 2–1 with goals from Jhonatan Bernardo and Ramiro Lizaso. In the second leg away, they held Phitsanulok to a 0–0 draw, winning the tie 2–1 on aggregate to book their place in the final.

== Match ==
=== Details ===
19 April 2025
18:00 UTC+7

Thonburi United	0–0 (a.e.t.)	Songkhla
	Report; Highlight; Full match
Penalties
Kittipong Seangbong (penalty scored); Sirakorn Pimbaotham (penalty scored); Phinit Phuthong (penalty missed); Yannatat Wannatong (penalty scored); Sarawut Bunrod (penalty scored); Kongpop Sroirak (penalty scored)	5–4	(penalty scored) Pornthep Heemla; (penalty scored) Suttipong Yaifai; (penalty scored) Nobparut Raksachum; (penalty missed) Chanatip Krainara; (penalty scored) Sanan Samala; (penalty missed) Sukree Etae

BG Stadium,
Thanyaburi, Pathum Thani
Attendance: 2,327
Referee: Noppadet Mangngam (Thailand)

Thonburi United	Songkhla

Lineups:
GK	46	(Thailand) Phacharathon Chalermtit
RB	16	(Thailand) Sirakorn Pimbaotham
CB	17	(Thailand) Chatturong Longsriphum (c)	(yellow card) 64'
CB	4	(Thailand) Kittipong Seangbong
LB	66	(Thailand) Patchanon Saophet		(substituted off) 86'
DM	33	(Thailand) Kunanon Paothong		(substituted off) 106'
CM	7	(Thailand) Suradech Klankham	(yellow card) 70'	(substituted off) 115'
CM	25	(Thailand) Surat Suriyachai
RF	24	(Thailand) Narathip Kruearanya		(substituted off) 68'
CF	11	(Thailand) Tanasrap Srikotapach		(substituted off) 86'
LF	10	(Thailand) Piyaphong Phrueksupee	(yellow card) 27'	(substituted off) 111'
Substitutes:
GK	43	(Thailand) Pattarapong Patcharoon
DF	5	(Thailand) Sarayut Kongkool
DF	22	(Thailand) Peerapong Ngaowanphlop		(substituted on) 115'
DF	53	(Thailand) Sarawut Bunrod		(substituted on) 86'
MF	8	(Thailand) Thanakorn Woharnklong		(substituted on) 86'
MF	14	(Thailand) Aphichai Kopimpa
MF	19	(Thailand) Kongpop Sroirak		(substituted on) 106'
MF	23	(Thailand) Thanawat Srilasak
MF	31	(Thailand) Poramate Silorut
MF	67	(Thailand) Sirimongkon Khunpanperng
MF	89	(Thailand) Yannatat Wannatong		(substituted on) 68'
FW	28	(Thailand) Phinit Phuthong		(substituted on) 111'
Head Coach:
(Thailand) Petprasert Jangcham

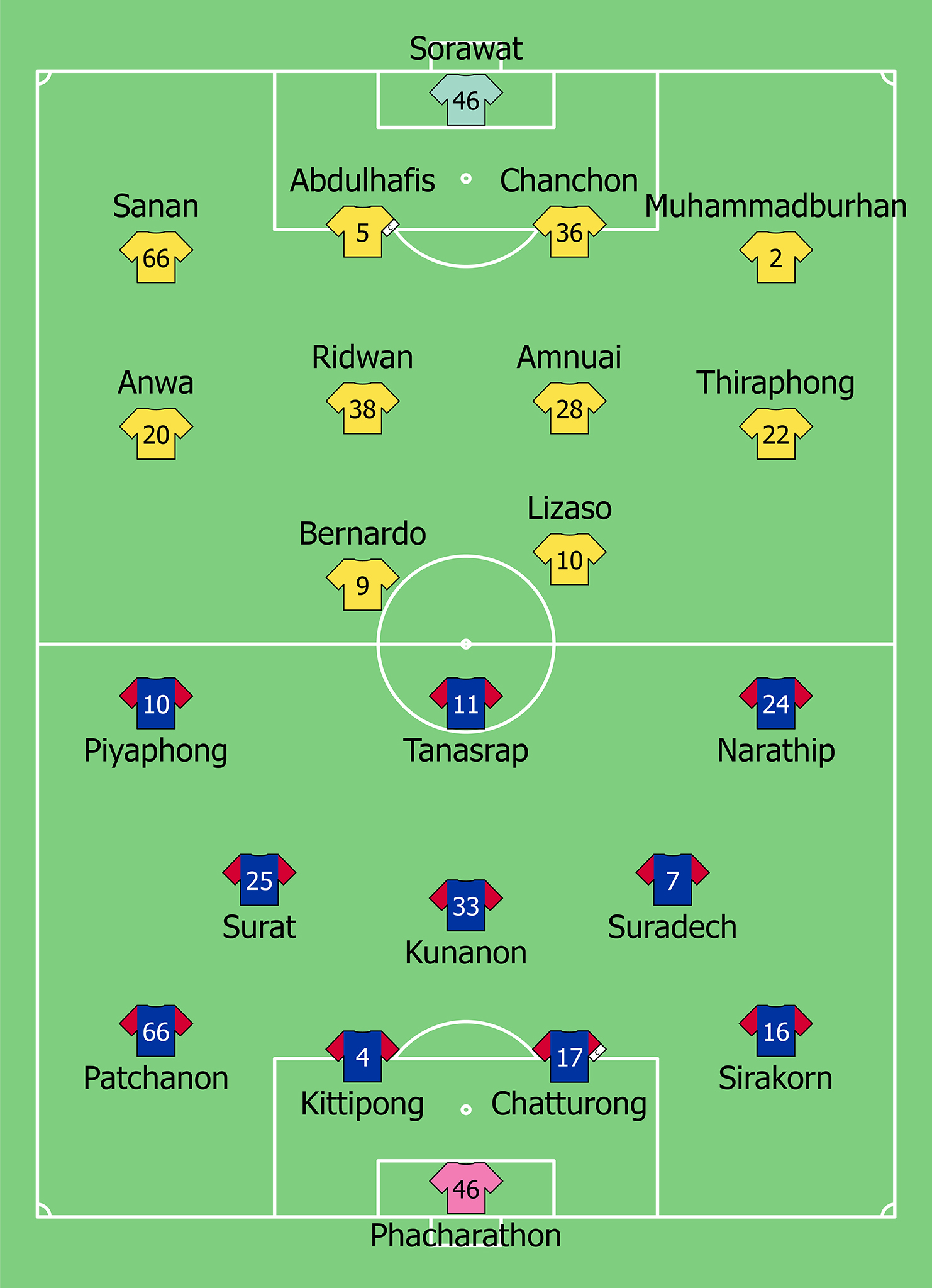

Lineups:
GK	46	(Thailand) Sorawat Phosaman
RB	66	(Thailand) Sanan Samala
CB	5	(Thailand) Abdulhafis Nibu (c)
CB	36	(Thailand) Chanchon Jomkao
LB	2	(Thailand) Muhammadburhan Awae	(yellow card) 93'
RM	20	(Thailand) Anwa A-leemama		(substituted off) 102'
CM	38	(Thailand) Ridwan Ruangchuai	(yellow card) 45+3'	(substituted off) 90+1'
CM	28	(Thailand) Amnuai Nueaoon	(red card) 105+1'
LM	22	(Thailand) Thiraphong Yangdi		(substituted off) 40'
SS	10	(Argentina) Ramiro Lizaso		(substituted off) 102'
CF	9	(Brazil) Jhonatan Bernardo		(substituted off) 90+1'
Substitutes:
GK	25	(Thailand) Nathaphat Wannamat
GK	50	(Thailand) Jedtarin Bunchod
DF	4	(Thailand) Sitthichai Chimrueang
DF	31	(Thailand) Supakon Phetrat
DF	42	(Thailand) Phanitan Peuangkeaw
DF	96	(Thailand) Chanatip Krainara		(substituted on) 102'
MF	6	(Thailand) Nobparut Raksachum		(substituted on) 102'
FW	7	(Thailand) Suttipong Yaifai		(substituted on) 90+1'
FW	11	(Thailand) Pornthep Heemla		(substituted on) 40'
FW	13	(Thailand) Sukree Etae		(substituted on) 90+1'
FW	91	(Thailand) Peerapat Kantha
Head Coach:
(Japan) Daiki Higuchi

Assistant referees:
(Thailand) Rawut Nakarit
(Thailand) Apichit Nophuan
Fourth official:
(Thailand) Thapakorn Thongkon
Assistant VAR:
(Thailand) Sivakorn Pu-udom
(Thailand) Natthaphon Mala
Match Commissioner:
(Thailand) Wisud Pruesapancha
Referee Assessor:
(Thailand) Nath Srisawvaluk
General Coordinator:
(Thailand) Pichaphon Suwannagood

MATCH RULES

- 90 minutes.
- 30 minutes extra-time if necessary.
- Penalty shoot-out if still necessary.
- Maximum of 6 substitutions (5 substitutions in 90 minutes and 1 substitution in 30 minutes extra-time).

== Winner ==
2024–25 Thai League 3 Cup
Winners
Thonburi United
First Title

=== Prizes for winner ===
- A champion trophy.
- 3,000,000 THB prize money.

=== Prizes for runners-up ===
- 1,000,000 THB prize money.

== See also ==
- 2024–25 Thai League 1
- 2024–25 Thai League 2
- 2024–25 Thai League 3
- 2024–25 Thai FA Cup
- 2024–25 Thai League Cup
- 2024–25 Thai League 3 Cup
