= 2026 Thai League 3 Cup final =

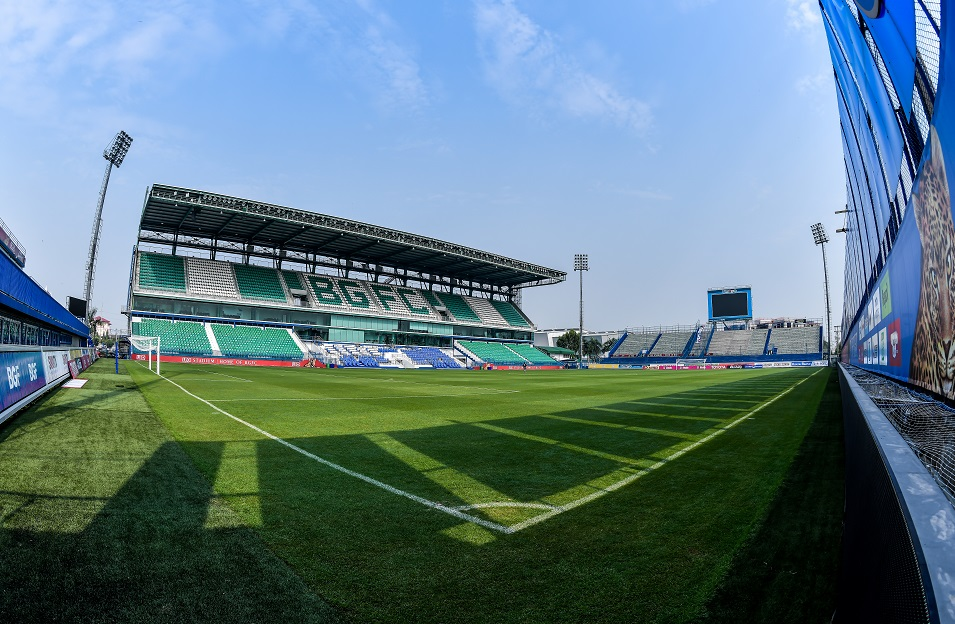
- The match took place at True BG Stadium.
- Event: 2025–26 Thai League 3 Cup
PT Satun	Thonburi United
3	2
- Date: 28 March 2026
- Venue: True BG Stadium, Thanyaburi, Pathum Thani
- Man of the Match: Caio da Conceição Silva (PT Satun)
- Referee: Alongkorn Khonwai (Thailand)
- Attendance: 2,223
- Weather: Fair; 31 °C (88 °F) humidity 64%

The 2026 Thai League 3 Cup final was the culmination of the 2025–26 Thai League 3 Cup, the third edition of Thailand's knockout football competition organized by the Football Association of Thailand (FA Thailand). The final took place at True BG Stadium in Pathum Thani, Thailand, on 28 March 2026, featuring PT Satun and Thonburi United. This match also used the Video assistant referee (VAR) system.

PT Satun, representing the Southern region, contested the final and sought national recognition for Satun province. Their appearance also continued the record of having at least one club from Southern Thailand reach the final in all three editions of the competition. Thonburi United, based in Bangkok, appeared in the final for the second consecutive season and entered as the defending champions. Under the league's regional balancing system, they competed in the Western region of the 2025–26 Thai League 3 and again aimed to secure the title and further strengthen their place in the tournament's history.

== Route to the final ==
Note: In all results below, the score of the finalist is given first (H: home; A: away; N: Clubs from Northern region; C: Clubs from Central region; NE: Clubs from Northeastern region; E: Clubs from Eastern region; W: Clubs from Western region; S: Clubs from Southern region.

PT Satun (S)				Round	Thonburi United (W)			
Opponent	Result			League phase	Opponent	Result		
Phuket Andaman (S)	2–2 (H)			Matchday 1	VRN Muangnont (W)	1–1 (H)		
PSU Surat Thani City (S)	4–2 (A)			Matchday 2	Samut Songkhram City (W)	0–1 (A)		
Muang Trang United (S)	4–0 (H)			Matchday 3	Thap Luang United (W)	2–0 (H)		
Samui United (S)	1–3 (A)			Matchday 4	Hua Hin City (W)	2–0 (A)		
Southern region runners-up: Pos / Team / Pld / Pts; 1 / Samui United / 4 / 8; 2 / PT Satun / 4 / 7; 3 / Nara United / 4 / 7; 4 / PSU Surat Thani City / 4 / 5; 5 / Phuket Andaman / 4 / 5; Source: Thai League				Final standings	Western region third-placed: Pos / Team / Pld / Pts; 1 / Samut Sakhon City / 4 / 12; 2 / Samut Songkhram City / 4 / 9; 3 / Thonburi United / 4 / 7; 4 / Thap Luang United / 4 / 7; 5 / Nonthaburi United / 4 / 4; Source: Thai League			
Opponent	Result			Knockout 1 leg	Opponent	Result		
Kasem Bundit University (C)	1–0 (A)			Round of 16	Samui United (S)	1–0 (A)		
Khon Kaen (NE)	4–2 (a.e.t.) (H)			Quarter-finals	Udon Banjan United (NE)	2–1 (a.e.t.) (A)		
Opponent	Agg.	1st leg	2nd leg	Knockout 2 legs	Opponent	Agg.	1st leg	2nd leg
Samut Sakhon City (W)	2–0	0–0 (H)	2–0 (A)	Semi-finals	Samut Songkhram City (W)	1–0	1–0 (A)	0–0 (H)

=== PT Satun ===
PT Satun advanced to the knockout stage of the 2025–26 Thai League 3 Cup by finishing second in the Southern region, collecting 7 points from two wins, one draw, and one defeat. They finished level on points with third-placed Nara United but progressed due to a superior goal difference. Their league phase campaign began with a 2–2 home draw against Phuket Andaman, with goals from Mairon Natan Pereira Maciel Oliveira and Caio da Conceição Silva. In their second match, they secured a 4–2 away victory over PSU Surat Thani City, with Oliveira and Lucas Gaudencio Moraes each scoring twice. They continued their strong form with a 4–0 home win against Muang Trang United, highlighted by a hat-trick from Silva and an additional goal from Anon Sanmad. However, they concluded the group stage with a 1–3 away defeat to Samui United, with Suttipong Yaifai scoring their only goal.

In the round of 16, PT Satun traveled to face Kasem Bundit University from the Central region and secured a narrow 1–0 victory, courtesy of Silva's goal. In the quarter-finals, they hosted Khon Kaen from the Northeastern region in a match that ended 2–2 in regular time, forcing extra time. PT Satun ultimately prevailed 4–2, with Silva scoring a hat-trick and Chaiyasit Popoon adding another goal. The semi-finals were played over two legs against Samut Sakhon City from the Western region. The first leg ended in a goalless draw at home, but PT Satun secured a decisive 2–0 away victory in the second leg, with goals from Silva and Pornthep Heemla. They advanced to the final with a 2–0 aggregate win.

=== Thonburi United ===
Thonburi United progressed to the knockout stage of the 2025–26 Thai League 3 Cup as one of the four best third-placed teams across all regions. Competing in the Western region, they finished third with 7 points from two wins, one draw, and one defeat, level on points with fourth-placed Thap Luang United but advancing on goal difference. Their league phase campaign began with a 1–1 home draw against VRN Muangnont, with Tanasrap Srikotapach scoring the equalizer. They then suffered a 0–1 away defeat to Samut Songkhram City. In their third match, they bounced back with a 2–0 home victory over Thap Luang United, with goals from Phurewat Aunthong and Narathip Kruearanya. They secured qualification with a 2–0 away win against Hua Hin City, thanks to goals from Ademola Sodiq Adeyemi and Kruearanya.

In the round of 16, Thonburi United traveled to face Samui United from the Southern region and secured a 1–0 victory, with Yannatat Wannatong scoring the decisive goal. In the quarter-finals, they faced Udon Banjan United from the Northeastern region. After a 1–1 draw in regular time, the match went into extra time, where Thonburi United emerged with a 2–1 win, with both goals scored by Kruearanya. In the semi-finals, they met fellow Western region side Samut Songkhram City in a two-legged tie. Thonburi United secured a crucial 1–0 away victory in the first leg through a goal from Adeyemi, before holding their opponents to a 0–0 draw at home in the second leg. They advanced to the final with a 1–0 aggregate win.

== Match ==
=== Details ===
28 March 2026
18:00 UTC+7

PT Satun	3–2	Thonburi United
Wellerson da Silva Machado Guimarães 21'; Phanthawat Khetchompu 33'; Caio da Conceição Silva 48'	Report; Highlight; Full match	Narathip Kruearanya 35'; Tanasrap Srikotapach 79'

True BG Stadium,
Thanyaburi, Pathum Thani
Attendance: 2,223
Referee: Alongkorn Khonwai (Thailand)

PT Satun	Thonburi United

Lineups:
GK	38	(Thailand) Wuttichai Panboot		(yellow card) 86'
RB	34	(Thailand) Kittikon Khetpara		(yellow card) 90+8'
CB	33	(Thailand) Anirut Buttoum			(substituted off) 83'
CB	24	(Thailand) Kantapon Sompittanurak
LB	21	(Thailand) Pornthep Heemla
RM	87	(Thailand) Phanthawat Khetchompu	33'		(substituted off) 83'
CM	17	(Thailand) Akkhadet Suksiri			(substituted off) 72'
CM	7	(Thailand) Chaiya Nakkaree
LM	70	(Thailand) Anon San-Mhard			(substituted off) 52'
CF	32	(Brazil) Wellerson da Silva Machado Guimarães	21'		(substituted off) 52'
CF	9	(Brazil) Caio da Conceição Silva (c)	48'	(yellow card) 45+3'
Substitutes:
GK	60	(Thailand) Watchara Buathong
DF	5	(Thailand) Thanakon Sathanphong			(substituted on) 83'
DF	49	(Thailand) Chaiyasit Popoon
MF	8	(Thailand) Thirawat Lertpitchapatch
MF	14	(Thailand) Suphakrit Matthochedi
MF	39	(Thailand) Ridwan Ruangchuai			(substituted on) 72'
MF	92	(Thailand) Airfan Cheali			(substituted on) 52'
FW	10	(Thailand) Chamsuddeen Sohteng
FW	11	(Brazil) Bruno Garcia Marcate			(substituted on) 52'
FW	16	(Thailand) Sakeereen Teekasom			(substituted on) 83'
FW	23	(Thailand) Kittiphong Khetpara
FW	71	(Thailand) Suttipong Yaifai
Head Coach:
(Thailand) Nirun Assawapakdee

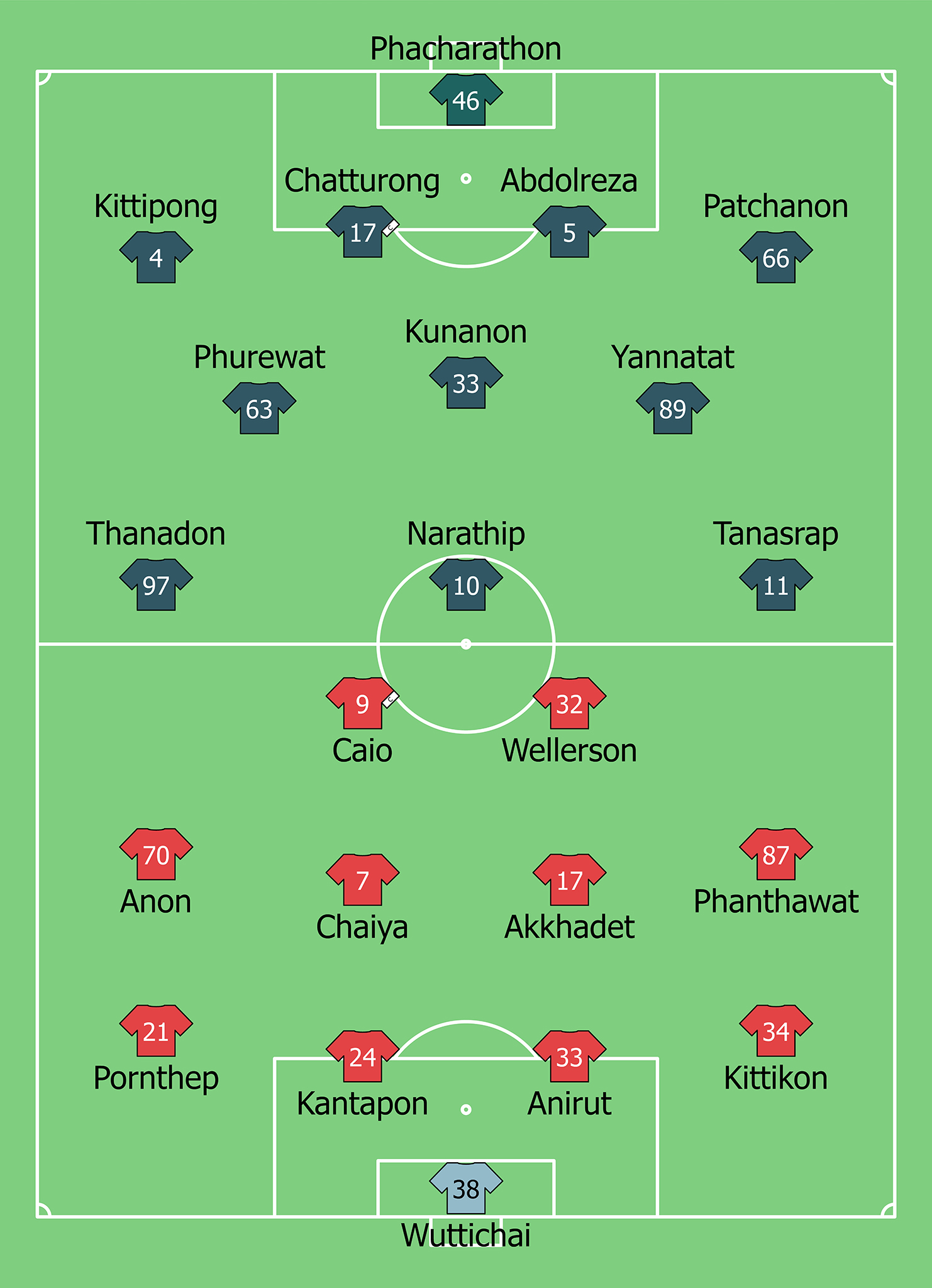

Lineups:
GK	46	(Thailand) Phacharathon Chalermtit
RB	4	(Thailand) Kittipong Seanphong
CB	17	(Thailand) Chatturong Longsriphum (c)			(substituted off) 46'
CB	5	(Iran) Abdolreza Zarei
LB	66	(Thailand) Patchanon Saophet
DM	33	(Thailand) Kunanon Paothong
CM	63	(Thailand) Phurewat Aunthong			(substituted off) 59'
CM	89	(Thailand) Yannatat Wannatong			(substituted off) 75'
RF	97	(Thailand) Thanadon Thongmuangiaung			(substituted off) 66'
CF	10	(Thailand) Narathip Kruearanya	35'
LF	11	(Thailand) Tanasrap Srikotapach	79'	(yellow card) 25'
Substitutes:
GK	29	(Thailand) Kittamed Sanubon
DF	20	(Thailand) Tawan Huntumlay			(substituted on) 75'
DF	99	(Thailand) Peerapong Ngaowanphlop
MF	6	(Thailand) Supakrit Piromnark
MF	16	(Thailand) Sirakorn Pimbaotham			(substituted on) 46'
MF	31	(Thailand) Poramate Silorut
FW	8	(Brazil) Breno Souza Dias			(substituted on) 66'
FW	19	(Thailand) Kongpop Sroirak
FW	28	(Thailand) Phinit Phuthong
FW	54	(Thailand) Kijtaphas Hnooyaem
FW	79	(Thailand) Sukit Fairee
FW	88	(Thailand) Phakhawat Sapphaso			(substituted on) 59'
Head Coach:
(Thailand) Petprasert Jangcham

Assistant referees:
(Thailand) Apichit Nophuan
(Thailand) Natthaphon Mala
Fourth official:
(Thailand) Kittichai Huthip
Assistant VAR:
(Thailand) Kitisak Pikunngoen
(Thailand) Torphong Somsing
Match Commissioner:
(Thailand) Katanyu Yaemniyomphan
Referee Assessor:
(Thailand) Chaiwat Kunsuta
General Coordinator:
(Thailand) Nuttapon Phaopanus

MATCH RULES

- 90 minutes.
- 30 minutes extra-time if necessary.
- Penalty shoot-out if still necessary.
- Maximum of 6 substitutions (5 substitutions in 90 minutes and 1 substitution in 30 minutes extra-time).

== Winner ==
PT Satun won the 2025–26 Thai League 3 Cup after defeating Thonburi United 3–2 in the final, securing their first title. The victory marked the second championship for a team from Southern Thailand and continued the region's record of having a representative in every final. Notably, this was the first final in the competition to be decided within 90 minutes.

2025–26 Thai League 3 Cup
Winners
PT Satun
First Title

=== Prizes for winner ===
- A champion trophy.
- 3,000,000 THB prize money.

=== Prizes for runners-up ===
- 1,000,000 THB prize money.

== See also ==
- 2025–26 Thai League 1
- 2025–26 Thai League 2
- 2025–26 Thai League 3
- 2025–26 Thai FA Cup
- 2025–26 Thai League Cup
- 2025–26 Thai League 3 Cup
