= 2024 Thai League 3 Cup final =

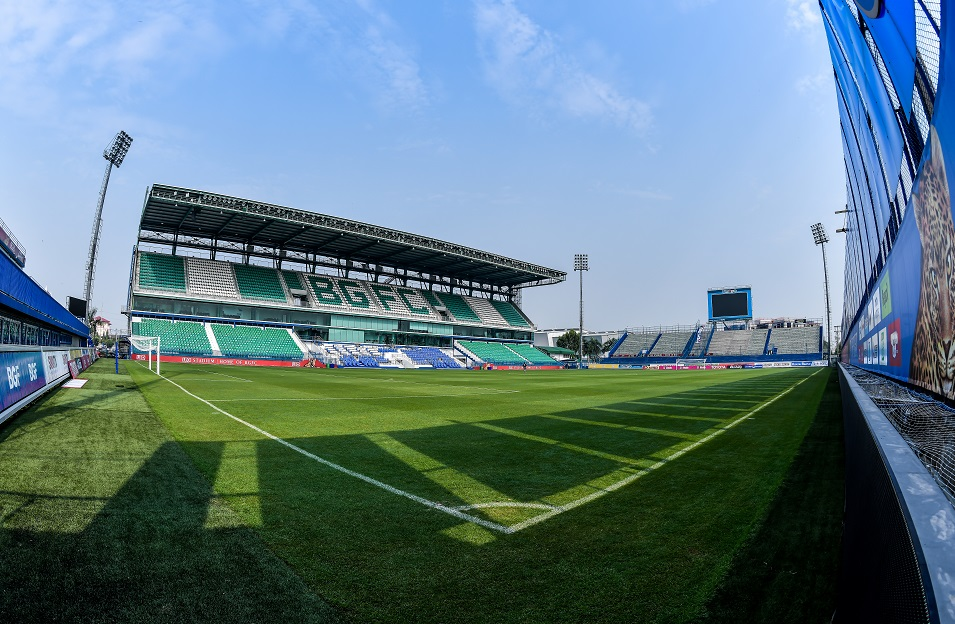
- The match took place at BG Stadium.
- Event: 2023–24 Thai League 3 Cup
| Phatthalung | Maejo United |
| 1 | 0 |
- After extra time
- Date: 3 March 2024
- Venue: BG Stadium, Thanyaburi, Pathum Thani
- Man of the Match: Jhonatan Bernardo (Phatthalung)
- Referee: Warintron Sassadee (Thailand)
- Attendance: 1,808
- Weather: Partly cloudy 34 °C (93 °F) humidity 57%

The 2024 Thai League 3 Cup final was the culmination of the 2023–24 Thai League 3 Cup, the inaugural edition of Thailand's knockout football competition organized by the Football Association of Thailand (FA Thailand). The final occurred at BG Stadium in Pathum Thani, Thailand, on 3 March 2024, featuring Phatthalung and Maejo United.

Phatthalung, representing the Southern region of the 2023–24 Thai League 3, carried the name and pride of Phatthalung Province into the final. Their journey to the decisive match was marked by disciplined performances and attacking strength. Meanwhile, Maejo United, hailing from the Northern region, is based in Chiang Mai Province. Their run to the final reflected a blend of technical ability and structured gameplay. This contest brought together two clubs from contrasting regions, each seeking to claim the first-ever Thai League 3 Cup title and secure their place in the history of the competition.

== Route to the final ==
Note: In all results below, the score of the finalist is given first (H: home; A: away; N: Clubs from Northern region; NE: Clubs from Northeastern region; E: Clubs from Eastern region; W: Clubs from Western region; S: Clubs from Southern region; BM: Clubs from Bangkok metropolitan region.

| Phatthalung (S) | | | | Round | Maejo United (N) | | | |
|---|---|---|---|---|---|---|---|---|
| Opponent | Result | | | Knockout 1 leg | Opponent | Result | | |
| Muang Trang United (S) | 3–1 (H) | | | Qualification | | | | |
| Thonburi United (BM) | 4–3 (A) | | | Round of 32 | Ubon Kruanapat (NE) | 1–0 (H) | | |
| Samut Prakan (BM) | 4–3 (A) | | | Round of 16 | Fleet (E) | 2–0 (H) | | |
| Surin City (NE) | 2–0 (A) | | | Quarter-finals | Songkhla (S) | 1–1 (a.e.t.) (4–3p) (A) | | |
| Opponent | Agg. | 1st leg | 2nd leg | Knockout 2 legs | Opponent | Agg. | 1st leg | 2nd leg |
| Uttaradit Saksiam (N) | 2–0 | 1–0 (A) | 1–0 (H) | Semi-finals | Lopburi City (W) | 6–5 | 3–1 (A) | 3–4 (H) |

== Match ==
=== Details ===
3 March 2024
16:30 UTC+7

| Phatthalung | 1–0 (a.e.t.) | Maejo United |
|---|---|---|
| Jhonatan Bernardo 101' | Report; Highlight; Full match |

BG Stadium,
Thanyaburi, Pathum Thani
Attendance: 1,808
Referee: Warintron Sassadee (Thailand)

| Phatthalung | Maejo United |

Lineups:
| GK | 30 | (Thailand) Wichaya Ganthong |
| RB | 23 | (Thailand) Taveechai Kliangklao | | (yellow card) 79' |
| CB | 4 | (Thailand) Zachary Singh Binrong | | (yellow card) 35' |
| CB | 5 | (Thailand) Eakaphong Thorchum |
| LB | 3 | (Thailand) Thanakorn Tomuai | | | (substituted off) 110' |
| DM | 24 | (Thailand) Chaiwat Ritthisak (c) | | | (substituted off) 96' |
| CM | 8 | (Laos) Mitsada Saitaifah |
| CM | 37 | (Thailand) Kongpop Artserm | | (yellow card) 116' | (substituted off) 119' |
| RF | 11 | (Brazil) Osvaldo Nascimento dos Santos Neto | | | (substituted off) 110' |
| CF | 19 | (Brazil) Jhonatan Bernardo | 101' | (yellow card) 101' (yellow-red card) 120+3' |
| LF | 31 | (Thailand) Decha Hwattaen | | | (substituted off) 73' |
Substitutes:
| GK | 1 | (Thailand) Surachat Suwantanon |
| DF | 2 | (Thailand) Thanakon Sathanpong |
| DF | 18 | (Thailand) Pongsakorn Klinsaowakon | | | (substituted on) 110' |
| DF | 33 | (Thailand) Sakareya Kolea |
| DF | 71 | (Thailand) Eakkaluk Lungnam |
| MF | 6 | (Thailand) Aphisit Chuayklab | | | (substituted on) 96' |
| MF | 97 | (Thailand) Amran Awae | | | (substituted on) 119' |
| FW | 13 | (Thailand) Thapkhon Markmee | | | (substituted on) 110' |
| FW | 17 | (Thailand) Fahal Bilteh | | | (substituted on) 73' |
Head Coach:
(Thailand) Piriya Chanpon

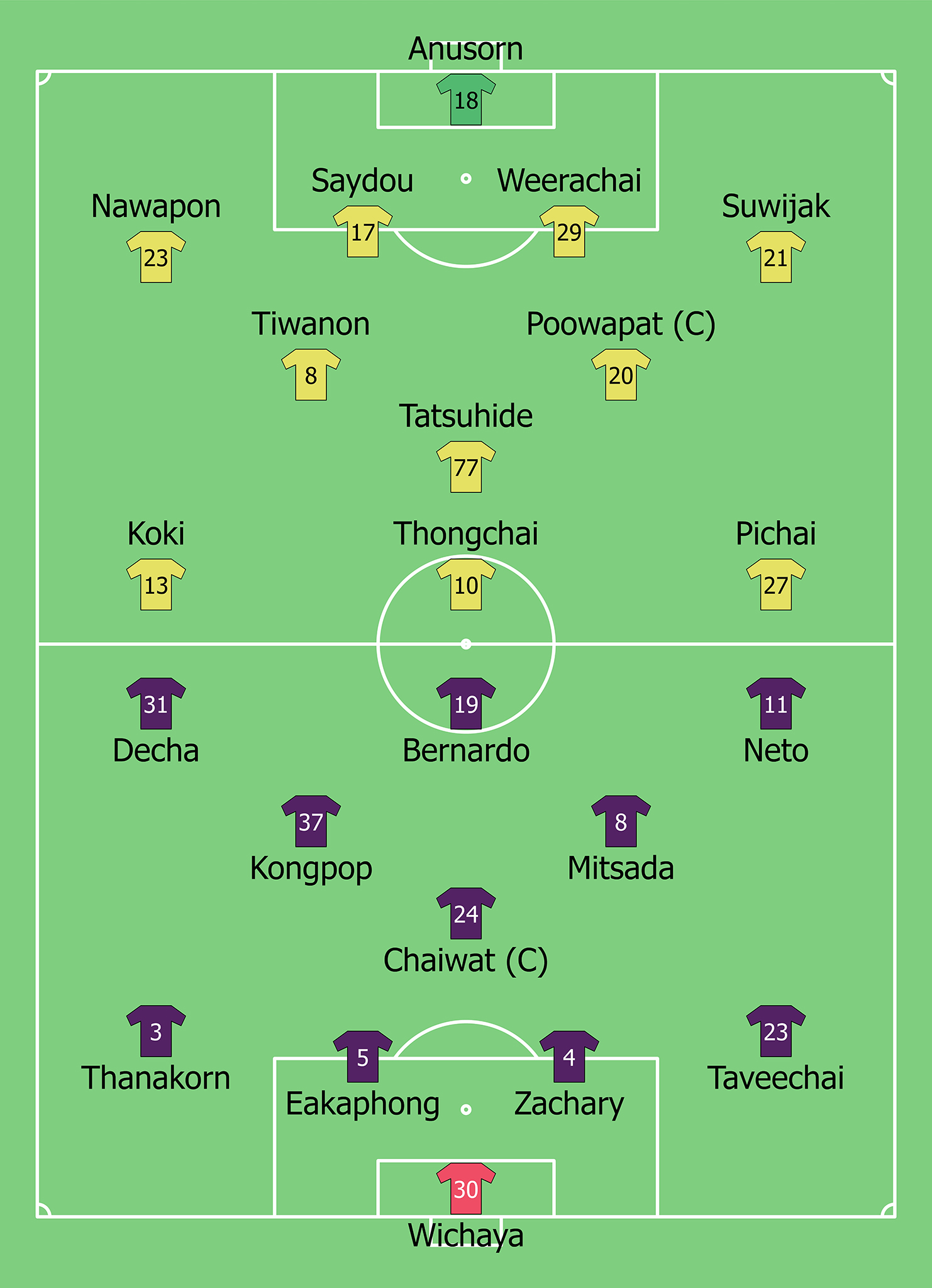

Lineups:
| GK | 18 | (Thailand) Anusorn Chansod |
| RB | 23 | (Thailand) Nawapon Krengkrad | (yellow card) 87' |
| CB | 17 | (Guinea) Maiga Diabate Ibrahima Saydou | (yellow card) 27' (yellow-red card) 109' |
| CB | 29 | (Thailand) Weerachai Takerngpol | | (substituted off) 65' |
| LB | 21 | (Thailand) Suwijak Moonkeaw |
| CM | 8 | (Thailand) Tiwanon Sopajan | | (substituted off) 62' |
| CM | 20 | (Thailand) Poowapat Netthip (c) | | (substituted off) 78' |
| AM | 77 | (Japan) Tatsuhide Shimizu |
| RF | 13 | (Japan) Koki Narita | | (substituted off) 100' |
| CF | 10 | (Thailand) Thongchai Ampornwiman | | (substituted off) 46' |
| LF | 27 | (Thailand) Pichai Thongvilas | | (substituted off) 46' |
Substitutes:
| GK | 28 | (Thailand) Supachai Kongpeam |
| DF | 3 | (Thailand) Songpon Tongthong |
| DF | 7 | (Thailand) Vichitnan Kruaythong | | (substituted on) 65' |
| DF | 30 | (Thailand) Nattapan Pansuchat |
| MF | 69 | (Thailand) Thustchaphon Manochompu | | (substituted on) 78' |
| FW | 11 | (Thailand) Kongphob Kamasit | | (substituted on) 46' |
| FW | 15 | (Thailand) Jaturaporn Senkham | | (substituted on) 100' |
| FW | 34 | (Thailand) Attaphon Kannoo | | (substituted on) 62' |
| FW | 71 | (Thailand) Ritthidet Phensawat | | (substituted on) 46' |
Head Coach:
(Thailand) Kriangsak Wankul

Assistant referees:
(Thailand) Chotrawee Tongduang
(Thailand) Poonsawat Samransuk
Fourth official:
(Thailand) Wichate Tainthong
Match Commissioner:
(Thailand) Natthakrit Chinabutr
Referee Assessor:
(Thailand) Sakchai Paebua
General Coordinator:
(Thailand) Wasutha Yangdiao

MATCH RULES

- 90 minutes.
- 30 minutes extra-time if necessary.
- Penalty shoot-out if still necessary.
- Maximum of 6 substitutions (5 substitutions in 90 minutes and 1 substitution in 30 minutes extra-time).

== Winner ==
2023–24 Thai League 3 Cup
Winners
Phatthalung
First Title

=== Prizes for winner ===
- A champion trophy.
- 3,000,000 THB prize money.

=== Prizes for runners-up ===
- 1,000,000 THB prize money.

== See also ==
- 2023–24 Thai League 1
- 2023–24 Thai League 2
- 2023–24 Thai League 3
- 2023–24 Thai FA Cup
- 2023–24 Thai League Cup
- 2023–24 Thai League 3 Cup
- 2023 Thailand Champions Cup
