= Krailas Panyaroj =

Thai footballer (born 1994)

Personal information
- Date of birth: 25 June 1994 (age 32)
- Place of birth: Ayutthaya, Thailand
- Height: 1.80 m (5 ft 11 in)
- Position: Right-back

Team information
- Current team: PTU Pathum Thani
- Number: 16

Youth career
- 2011–2013: Muangthong United

Senior career*
| Years | Team | Apps | (Gls) |
| 2013 | Nonthaburi | | |
| 2014 | MOF Customs United | | |
| 2015 | Thonburi City | | |
| 2016 | Rajpracha | | |
| 2017 | Ayutthaya | | |
| 2017–2018 | Angthong | | |
| 2018 | Pattaya United | 6 | (0) |
| 2019–2020 | Samut Prakan City | 8 | (0) |
| 2020–2021 | Chainat Hornbill | 15 | (1) |
| 2021 | Customs Ladkrabang United | 16 | (2) |
| 2022 | Songkhla | 11 | (3) |
| 2022 | Ayutthaya United | 14 | (2) |
| 2023 | Songkhla | 10 | (0) |
| 2023–2024 | Kasetsart | 13 | (0) |
| 2024– | PTU Pathum Thani | 16 | (0) |
- * Club domestic league appearances and goals as of 17 December 2025

Krailas Panyaroj (Thai: ไกรลาศ ปัญญาโรจน์; born June 25, 1994) is a Thai professional footballer who plays as a right-back.

== Honours ==
=== Club ===
Songkhla

- Thai League 3 Southern Region: 2022–23
