= Thawatchai Aocharod =

Thai footballer (born 2003)

Personal information
- Full name: Thawatchai Aocharod
- Date of birth: 20 January 2003 (age 23)
- Place of birth: Nong Bua Lamphu, Thailand
- Height: 1.70 m (5 ft 7 in)
- Position: Defensive midfielder

Team information
- Current team: Udon United
- Number: 23

Youth career
- 2015–2018: Nongbua Pitchaya
- 2019–2020: Leicester City
- 2021: Nongbua Pitchaya

Senior career*
Years	Team	Apps	(Gls)
2021–2024	Nongbua Pitchaya	30	(1)
2024–	Udon United	0	(0)

International career
2019	Thailand U16	1	(0)
2022–	Thailand U23	2	(0)
- * Club domestic league appearances and goals

Thawatchai Aocharod (Thai: ธวัชชัย โอชารส, born 20 January 2003) is a Thai professional footballer who plays as a defensive midfielder for Thai League 3 club Udon United.

== Club career ==
In October 2021, Thawatchai made his senior debut in Thai League 1 for Nongbua Pitchaya against Chiangrai United.
