= Narathip Kruearanya =

Thai footballer (born 1995)

Personal information
- Date of birth: 19 December 1995 (age 30)
- Place of birth: Bangkok, Thailand
- Height: 1.78 m (5 ft 10 in)
- Positions: Winger; forward

Team information
- Current team: Thonburi United
- Number: 10

Senior career*
Years	Team	Apps	(Gls)
2017	Krung Thonburi		
2018	Air Force United		
2019	Pattaya Discovery United	28	(17)
2020–2021	Chonburi	6	(0)
2021	Suphanburi	2	(0)
2021–2022	Thonburi United	11	(5)
2022	Pattaya Dolphins United	6	(0)
2023	Dragon Pathumwan Kanchanaburi	17	(3)
2023–2024	Customs United	25	(5)
2024	Pattaya United	9	(0)
2025–	Thonburi United	18	(2)
- * Club domestic league appearances and goals as of 22 March 2026

Narathip Kruearanya (Thai: นราธิป เครือรัญญา, born December 19, 1995) is a Thai professional footballer who plays as a winger and forward for Thai League 3 club Thonburi United.
