= True BG Stadium =

Stadium in Thanyaburi, Pathum Thani, Thailand

- True BG Stadium at 2026–27 AFC Women's Champions League preliminary stage in 2026.
- Interactive map of True BG Stadium
- Full name: True BG Stadium
- Former names: Leo Stadium (2010–2021); BG Stadium (2022–2025)
- Location: Bueng Yitho, Thanyaburi, Pathum Thani, Thailand
- Coordinates: 14°00′02″N 100°40′45″E
- Owner: BG Pathum United
- Operator: BG Pathum United
- Capacity: 14,814
- Surface: Grass
- Record attendance: 14,469 (BG Pathum United vs Buriram United, 29 December 2024)

Construction
- Opened: 2010 (after being renovated)
- Expanded: 2024 (fourth side stand)
- Cost: ฿625 million

Tenants
- BG Pathum United (2010–present); Bangkok United (2025–present)

True BG Stadium or Pathum Thani Stadium is a football stadium in Thanyaburi, Pathum Thani, Thailand, and the home of BG Pathum United and Bangkok United of the Thai League 1.

Previously known for its iconic three-sided main stand, the newly constructed fourth stand expanded the stadium's capacity to 14,814 spectators. The stadium has been certified by the International Association Football Federation (FIFA) and by the Asian Football Federation (AFC) as an A-Class football stadium. Since opening, the ground has been installed with high-quality artificial surface. However, from the season 2018 onward the stadium was replaced with real grass.

In addition to being the home of BG Pathum United, it was also used to organize international competitions for the Thailand national football team including the important football cup matches in Thailand.

== History ==
The stadium has also hosted 2021 AFC Champions League, 2022 AFC Champions League, 2023–24 AFC Champions League group stage, 2024–25 AFC Women's Champions League and 2026 AFC U-20 Women's Asian Cup matches.

On 3 April 2024, A new fourth side stand (Zone E stand) was added to the east side of the stadium after the Stadium had only three side stands for 14 years.

On 21 July 2024, the stadium reached its record attendance match (14,114) where BG Pathum United played a friendly exhibition match against 2023–24 UEFA Champions League finalist Borussia Dortmund where BG Pathum United went on to win 4–0.

Heading into the 2025/26 season, BG Stadium will be using the name True BG Stadium and the ground will be shared between BG Pathum United and Bangkok United due to sponsorship agreement with True Corporation.

== International football matches ==
Date	Competitions	Team 1	Final Score	Team 2
23 December 2016	Friendly	Thailand	0–0	Vietnam
10 October 2019	Friendly	Thailand	1–1	Congo
27 March 2022	Friendly	Thailand	1–0	Suriname
31 March 2022	Friendly	Thailand	1–2	Bahrain

== Domestic Cup Finals hosted at BG Stadium ==
Year	Champion	Final Score	Runner-up	Competitions
2019	Port	1–0	Ratchaburi	2019 Thai FA Cup final
2021–22	Buriram United	4–0	PT Prachuap	2022 Thai League Cup final
2023–24	Phatthalung	1–0	Maejo United	2024 Thai League 3 Cup final
