= 2015 SCG Muangthong United F.C. season =

SCG Muangthong United
2015 season
- Chairman: Pongsak Phol-Anan
- Manager: Dragan Talajić
- Stadium: SCG Stadium
- Thai Premier League: 2nd
- Thai FA Cup: Runners-up
- Thai League Cup: Round of 32
- Top goalscorer: League: Cleiton Silva (25); All: Cleiton Silva (32)
| Home colours | Away colours | Third colours |

The 2015 season was SCG Muangthong United's seventh season in the Thai Premier League of SCG Muangthong United Football Club. SCG Muangthong United has participated in the Thai Premier League since 2009.

== Pre-season and friendlies ==
| Date | Opponents | H / A | Result F–A | Scorers |
|---|---|---|---|---|
| 5 January 2015 | TOT | A | 2–1 | Cleiton 1', Thitipan 20' |
| 13 January 2015 | Army United | H | 1–0 | Cleiton 48' |
| 18 January 2015 | Udon Thani | A | 0–1 | |
| 25 January 2015 | (South Korea) Busan IPark | H | 0–1; Highlight | |
| 28 January 2015 | (South Korea) Jeonnam Dragons | H | 1–1 | Cleiton 32' |
| 8 February 2015 | Thonburi City | A | 2–0 | Cleiton 45', Teerasil 74' |
| 20 March 2015 | Phangnga | A | 3–1 | Cleiton (3) 64', 84', 88' |
| 22 March 2015 | Phuket | A | 2–2 | Seksit 45', Teerasil 80' |
| 28 March 2015 | Osotspa M-150 | H | 1–0 | Cleiton 80' |

== Thai Premier League ==
| Pos | Team | Pld | W | D | L | GF | GA | GD | Pts | Qualification or relegation |
|---|---|---|---|---|---|---|---|---|---|---|
| 1 | Buriram United (C, Q) | 34 | 25 | 9 | 0 | 98 | 24 | +74 | 84 | 2016 AFC Champions League group stage |
| 2 | Muangthong United (Q) | 34 | 21 | 8 | 5 | 81 | 35 | +46 | 71 | 2016 AFC Champions League Qualifying play-off (Note: The winners of the 2015 Thai FA Cup will also qualify for the play-off of the 2016 AFC Champions League. Since the FA Cup winners have already qualified to ACL through the championship and runners-up - because the Thai FA Cup Final is between Buriram and Muangthong - the spot will be awarded to the third-placed team.) |
| 3 | Suphanburi | 34 | 16 | 11 | 7 | 60 | 39 | +21 | 59 | |
| 4 | Chonburi (Q) | 34 | 15 | 12 | 7 | 62 | 44 | +18 | 57 (Note: CHO 1–0 BKU; BKU 1–1 CHO) | 2016 AFC Champions League Qualifying play-off |
| 5 | Bangkok United | 34 | 16 | 9 | 9 | 59 | 47 | +12 | 57 | |

Updated to match(es) played on 13 December 2015. Source: Thai Premier League
Rules for classification: 1) points; 2) head-to-head points; 3) head-to-head goal difference; 4) goal difference; 5) number of goals scored
(C) Champions; (Q) Qualified for the phase indicated
Notes:

| Date | Opponents | H / A | Result F–A | Scorers | League position |
|---|---|---|---|---|---|
| 15 February 2015 | Nakhon Ratchasima Mazda | A | 1–0; Highlight | Sarach 51' | 8th |
| 21 February 2015 | Buriram United | H | 1–1; Highlight | Mario 3' (pen.) | 8th |
| 28 February 2015 | Bangkok Glass | A | 0–0; Highlight | | 9th |
| 7 March 2015 | Port MTI | H | 1–0; Highlight | Cleiton 52' | 5th |
| 11 March 2015 | Sisaket | H | 1–0; Highlight | Cleiton 88' | 4th |
| 4 April 2015 | Suphanburi | A | 1–2; Highlight | Mario 70' | 7th |
| 26 April 2015 | Bangkok United | H | 1–1; Highlight | Cleiton 90' | 7th |
| 29 April 2015 | Navy | A | 4–1; Highlight | Thitipan 30', Chananan 33', Teerasil 45+3', Wuttichai 90+2' | 5th |
| 2 May 2015 | Osotspa M-150 | H | 2–1; Highlight | Chananan 3', Piyaphon 26' | 4th |
| 9 May 2015 | Chiangrai United | A | 2–1; Highlight | Teerasil 24', Cleiton 88' | 2nd |
| 21 June 2015 | TOT | H | 3–0; Highlight | Cleiton (3) 40' (pen.), 74', 80' | 2nd |
| 28 June 2015 | Chonburi | A | 1–2; Highlight | Mario 15' | 2nd |
| 5 July 2015 | Army United | H | 2–0; Highlight | Chananan 39', Wuttichai 81' | 3rd |
| 12 July 2015 | Chainat Hornbill | A | 1–0; Highlight | Teerasil 54' | 3rd |
| 15 July 2015 | Ratchaburi Mitr Phol | H | 3–0; Highlight | Chananan 16', Cleiton (2) 29', 85' | 2nd |
| 18 July 2015 | BEC Tero Sasana | A | 1–1; Highlight | Kasidech 90+5' | 2nd |
| 25 July 2015 | Gulf Saraburi | H | 2–0; Highlight | Mario 46', Kasidech 68' | 2nd |
| 1 August 2015 | Buriram United | A | 2–2; Highlight | Mario 16', Cleiton 85' | 2nd |
| 9 August 2015 | Bangkok Glass | H | 5–0; Highlight | Cleiton 2', Teerasil 8', Mario 57', Chananan (2) 87', 90' | 2nd |
| 19 August 2015 | Sisaket | A | 3–1; Highlight | Thitipan (2) 9', 25', Cleiton 71' | 1st |
| 13 September 2015 | Bangkok United | A | 5–3; Highlight | Cleiton (2) 30' (pen.), 75', Mario 47', Teerasil 84', Chananan 90+2' | 1st |
| 16 September 2015 | Port MTI | A | 2–1; Highlight | Teerasil 42', Thitipan 64' | 1st |
| 19 September 2015 | Navy | H | 7–0; Highlight | Mario 37', Teerasil (3) 38', 54', 90+4' (pen.), Chananan (2) 78', 85', Cleiton 90+2' | 1st |
| 26 September 2015 | Osotspa M-150 Samut Prakan | A | 5–1; Highlight | Thitipan 2', Cleiton (2) 23', 67', Mario 45+2' (pen.), Chananan 65' | 1st |
| 18 October 2015 | Chiangrai United | H | 4–1; Highlight | Aoyama 2', Mario (3) 26', 30', 75' | 1st |
| 24 October 2015 | TOT | A | 1–1; Highlight | Teerasil 22' | 2nd |
| 28 October 2015 | Chonburi | H | 4–2; Highlight | Mario (3) 21', 38', 77', Cleiton 52' | 2nd |
| 31 October 2015 | Army United | A | 1–2; Highlight | Cleiton 20' | 2nd |
| 15 November 2015 | Suphanburi | H | 2–2; Highlight | Cleiton (2) 48' (pen.), 71' | 2nd |
| 22 November 2015 | Chainat Hornbill | H | 2–3; Highlight | Sivakorn 75', Chananan 80' | 2nd |
| 29 November 2015 | Ratchaburi Mitr Phol | A | 4–0; Highlight | Mario 39', Cleiton (2) 45+1', 76', Teerasil 73' | 2nd |
| 6 December 2015 | BEC Tero Sasana | H | 1–2; Highlight | Mario 28' | 2nd |
| 9 December 2015 | Saraburi | A | 4–2; Highlight | Sarach 32', Cleiton (2) 51' (pen.), 90+5', Mario 84' | 2nd |
| 13 December 2015 | Nakhon Ratchasima Mazda | H | 2–2; Highlight | Mario (2) 12', 34' | 2nd |

== Thai FA Cup ==
Chang FA Cup

| Date | Opponents | H / A | Result F–A | Scorers | Round |
|---|---|---|---|---|---|
| 24 June 2015 | Khonkaen United | A | 2–0 | Cleiton 30', Mario 55' | Round of 64 |
| 29 July 2015 | Navy | H | 3–1; Highlight | Cleiton (3) 17' (pen.), 39', 90+2' (pen.) | Round of 32 |
| 12 August 2015 | Osotspa M-150 Samut Prakan | H | 1–0; Highlight | Cleiton 28' | Round of 16 |
| 23 September 2015 | Chiangrai United | H | 1–0; Highlight | Cleiton 79' (pen.) | Quarter-finals |
| 2 December 2015 | Army United | N | 2–1; Highlight | Mario 41', Teerasil 90+3' | Semi-finals |
| 26 December 2015 | Buriram United | N | 1–3; Highlight | Mario 81' | Final |

== Thai League Cup ==
Toyota League Cup

| Date | Opponents | H / A | Result F–A | Scorers | Round |
|---|---|---|---|---|---|
| 18 April 2015 | Songkhla United | A | 4–1; Highlight | Teerasil (2) 35', 60', Cleiton 45+2', Thitipan 58' | Round of 64 |
| 1 July 2015 | Police United | A | 0–2 (a.e.t.); Highlight | | Round of 32 |

== Squad statistics ==
| No. | Pos. | Name | League | | FA Cup | | League Cup | | Total | | Discipline | |
| No. | Pos. | Name | Apps | Goals | Apps | Goals | Apps | Goals | Apps | Goals | Yellow card | Red card |
|---|---|---|---|---|---|---|---|---|---|---|---|---|
| 1 | GK | (Thailand) Kawin Thamsatchanan | 29 | 0 | 5 | 0 | 1 | 0 | 35 | 0 | 0 | 0 |
| 4 | MF | (Thailand) Piyaphon Phanichakul | 16(5) | 1 | 3 | 0 | 2 | 0 | 21(5) | 1 | 4 | 0 |
| 5 | DF | (Japan) Naoaki Aoyama | 29(2) | 1 | 6 | 0 | 2 | 0 | 37(2) | 1 | 5 | 0 |
| 6 | DF | (South Korea) Kim Dong-Jin | 28 | 0 | 5 | 0 | 2 | 0 | 35 | 0 | 7 | 0 |
| 7 | MF | (Thailand) Datsakorn Thonglao (c) | 25(1) | 0 | 4 | 0 | 2 | 0 | 31(1) | 0 | 7 | 0 |
| 8 | DF | (Thailand) Artit Daosawang | 14(1) | 0 | 2 | 0 | 1 | 0 | 17(1) | 0 | 2 | 0 |
| 10 | FW | (Thailand) Teerasil Dangda (vc) | 34 | 11 | 6 | 1 | 1 | 2 | 41 | 14 | 1 | 0 |
| 11 | FW | (Thailand) Wuttichai Tathong | 0(10) | 2 | 1 | 0 | 0(1) | 0 | 1(11) | 2 | 1 | 0 |
| 14 | DF | (Thailand) Supravee Miprathang | 2 | 0 | 0 | 0 | 0 | 0 | 2 | 0 | 1 | 0 |
| 15 | MF | (Thailand) Seksit Srisai | 1(15) | 0 | 2(1) | 0 | 1(1) | 0 | 4(17) | 0 | 2 | 0 |
| 16 | MF | (Thailand) Sarach Yooyen | 32 | 2 | 4 | 0 | 1(1) | 0 | 37(1) | 2 | 5 | 0 |
| 17 | MF | (Thailand) Pathompol Charoenrattanapirom | 0 | 0 | 0 | 0 | 0(1) | 0 | 0(1) | 0 | 0 | 0 |
| 20 | MF | (North Macedonia) Mario Gjurovski | 29(2) | 20 | 5 | 3 | 2 | 0 | 36(2) | 23 | 3 | 0 |
| 21 | MF | (Thailand) Phitiwat Sukjitthammakul | 0(3) | 0 | 0 | 0 | 0 | 0 | 0(3) | 0 | 0 | 0 |
| 22 | FW | (Thailand) Chananan Pombuppha | 11(18) | 11 | 1(3) | 0 | 1(1) | 0 | 13(22) | 11 | 1 | 0 |
| 23 | FW | (Brazil) Cleiton Silva | 33 | 25 | 6 | 6 | 2 | 1 | 41 | 32 | 4 | 1 |
| 24 | MF | (Thailand) Kasidech Wettayawong | 9(13) | 2 | 4 | 0 | 0(1) | 0 | 13(14) | 2 | 2 | 0 |
| 25 | MF | (Thailand) Thitipan Puangchan | 31 | 5 | 3(1) | 0 | 2 | 1 | 36(1) | 6 | 6 | 0 |
| 26 | DF | (Thailand) Suphan Thongsong | 7(2) | 0 | 0(1) | 0 | 0 | 0 | 7(3) | 0 | 2 | 0 |
| 27 | DF | (Thailand) Sarawut Kanlayanabandit | 3(2) | 0 | 2 | 0 | 1 | 0 | 6(2) | 0 | 3 | 1 |
| 28 | DF | (Thailand) Suriya Singmui | 19 | 0 | 3(1) | 0 | 0 | 0 | 22(1) | 0 | 3 | 0 |
| 30 | GK | (Thailand) Jakree Nimnuan | 3 | 0 | 0 | 0 | 0 | 0 | 3 | 0 | 0 | 0 |
| 31 | MF | (Thailand) Sivakorn Tiatrakul | 0(11) | 1 | 0 | 0 | 0 | 0 | 0(11) | 1 | 2 | 0 |
| 35 | DF | (Thailand) Weerawut Kayem | 1(2) | 0 | 0 | 0 | 0 | 0 | 1(2) | 0 | 0 | 0 |
| 37 | DF | (Thailand) Suporn Peenagatapho | 16(3) | 0 | 3(1) | 0 | 0 | 0 | 19(4) | 0 | 5 | 0 |
| 39 | GK | (Thailand) Witsanusak Kaewruang | 2 | 0 | 1 | 0 | 1 | 0 | 4 | 0 | 0 | 0 |
| 40 | MF | (Thailand) Patiphan Pinsermsootsri | 0 | 0 | 0(3) | 0 | 0 | 0 | 0(3) | 0 | 0 | 0 |
| — | MF | (Thailand) Siwakorn Jakkuprasat | 0(5) | 0 | 0 | 0 | 0 | 0 | 0(5) | 0 | 1 | 0 |
| — | — | Own goals | – | 1 | – | 0 | – | 0 | – | 1 | – | – |

== Transfers ==
First Thai footballer's market is opening on 6 November 2014 to 28 January 2015

Second Thai footballer's market is opening on 3 June 2015 to 30 June 2015

=== In ===
| Date | Pos. | Name | From |
|---|---|---|---|
| 26 December 2014 | FW | (Thailand) Chananan Pombuppha | (Thailand) Osotspa M-150 |
| 26 December 2014 | MF | (Thailand) Wattana Playnum | (Thailand) Ayutthaya |
| 12 January 2015 | DF | (Japan) Naoaki Aoyama | (Japan) Ventforet Kofu |
| 12 January 2015 | MF | (Thailand) Peeradon Chamratsamee | (Thailand) Chamchuri United |

=== Out ===
| Date | Pos. | Name | To |
|---|---|---|---|
| 17 November 2014 | FW | (England) Jay Bothroyd | (Japan) Júbilo Iwata |
| 17 November 2014 | DF | (Spain) Aritz Borda | (Romania) Rapid București |
| 17 November 2014 | FW | (Serbia) Milan Bubalo | (Thailand) Pattaya United |
| 29 June 2015 | MF | (Thailand) Siwakorn Jakkuprasat | (Thailand) Port MTI |
| 13 July 2015 | FW | (Thailand) Wuttichai Tathong | (Thailand) Port MTI |
| 13 July 2015 | DF | (Thailand) Todsapol Lated | (Thailand) Port MTI |

=== Loan out ===
| Date from | Date to | Pos. | Name | To |
|---|---|---|---|---|
| 6 January 2015 | 31 December 2015 | FW | (Thailand) Chayawat Srinawong | (Thailand) PTT Rayong |
| 6 January 2015 | 31 December 2015 | FW | (Thailand) Chainarong Tathong | (Thailand) Osotspa Samut Prakan |
| 6 January 2015 | 3 June 2015 | MF | (Thailand) Woranat Thongkruea | (Thailand) Pattaya United |
| 6 January 2015 | 3 June 2015 | MF | (Thailand) Sarawut Masuk | (Thailand) Nakhon Ratchasima Mazda |
| 6 January 2015 | 3 June 2015 | MF | (Ivory Coast) Diarra Ali | (Thailand) Port |
| 3 June 2015 | 31 December 2015 | MF | (Thailand) Woranat Thongkruea | (Thailand) Nakhon Ratchasima Mazda |
| 3 June 2015 | 31 December 2015 | DF | (Thailand) Weerawut Kayem | (Thailand) PTT Rayong |
| 3 June 2015 | 31 December 2015 | MF | (Ivory Coast) Diarra Ali | (Thailand) TTM |
| 3 June 2015 | 31 December 2015 | MF | (Thailand) Pathompol Charoenrattanapirom | (Thailand) Ayutthaya |
