= 2011 Thai Division 1 League =

Thai Division 1 League
- Season: 2011
- Champions: Buriram (Takeover by Songkhla F.C. original)
- Promoted: Wuachon United (Rename from Buriram F.C.); Chainat; BBCU
- Relegated: SPCU; Chiangmai; RBAC; Thai Honda
- Matches played: 306
- Goals scored: 817 (2.67 per match)
- Top goalscorer: Adisak Srikampang, Phuwadol Suwannachart (21 goals)
- Biggest home win: Chainat 7-0 Air Force United (4 December 2011); Songkhla 7-0 Phuket (11 December 2011)
- Biggest away win: RBAC Mittraphap 0-4 Suphan Buri (19 March 2011)
- Highest scoring: Songkhla 7-1 Raj-Pracha (18 December 2011) (8 goals)
- Highest attendance: 36,715; Songkhla vs Buriram, August 7, 2011
- Lowest attendance: 0 Suphanburi vs Songkhla United; December 3, 2011
- Average attendance: 2,897

2011 Thai League Division 1 is the 14th season of the League since its establishment in 1997. It is the feeder league for the Thai Premier League. A total of 18 teams will compete in the league.

== League expansion ==
It was announced at the end of the 2010 season that the TPL would increase the number of teams for the start of the 2011 Thai Premier League season. Therefore, playoff games were arranged to promote more teams for the Regional League Division 2 and relegate less teams from the TPL. During these games, Nakhon Pathom were banned and therefore will fail to take their place in Division 1 for the next two seasons. This did mean that the league would only feature 17 teams for the season, but with less than 3 weeks before the start of the league campaign another round of playoffs was used to promote one more side, Saraburi.

== Changes from last season ==
=== Team changes ===
==== From Division 1 ====
Promoted to Thai Premier League

- Sriracha
- Khonkaen
- Chiangrai United

Relegated to Regional League Division 2

- Prachinburi
- Narathiwat

==== To Division 1 ====
Relegated from Thai Premier League

- Bangkok United

Promoted from Regional League Division 2

- Buriram
- F.C. Phuket
- Chiangmai
- Chainat
- Rangsit University JW
- Bangkok
- Saraburi

==== Clubs serving bans ====
- Nakhon Pathom - 2 years

== Teams ==
=== Stadia and locations ===
Locations of the Thai Division 1 League 2011 teams
Football clubs in Bangkok Metropolitan Region

Team	Location	Stadium	Capacity	Ref.
Air Force United	Pathum Thani	Thupatemee Stadium	20,000	
Bangkok	Thung Khru, Bangkok	72-years Anniversary Stadium (Bang Mod)	8,126	
Bangkok United	Din Daeng, Bangkok	Thai-Japanese Stadium	10,320	
Buriram	Buriram	I-Mobile Stadium	14,000	
BBCU	Phaya Thai, Bangkok	Thai Army Sports Stadium	20,000	
Chainat	Chainat	Khao Plong Stadium	5,574	
Cash Today Chanthaburi	Chanthaburi	Rambhai Barni Rajabhat University Stadium	8,800	
Chiangmai	Chiang Mai	700th Anniversary Stadium	25,000	
F.C. Phuket	Phuket	Surakul Stadium	15,000	
PTT Rayong	Rayong	Rayong Province Central Stadium PTT Stadium	7,500 12,161	
Raj Pracha F.C. Thailand	Nakhon Pathom	Mahidol University Salaya Campus Stadium	1,000	
J.W. Rangsit	Pathum Thani	Thupatemee Stadium	20,000	
RBAC	Bang Kapi, Bangkok	RBAC University Stadium	1,000	
Gulf Saraburi	Saraburi	Saraburi Provincial Administrative Organization Stadium	5,000	
Songkhla	Songkhla	Tinsulanon Stadium	35,000	
Suphanburi	Suphanburi	Suphan Buri Provincial Stadium	16,000	
Samut Prakan Customs United	Samut Prakan	Lad Krabang 54 Stadium	1,100	
Thai Honda	Min Buri, Bangkok	72nd Anniversary Stadium (Min Buri)	8,000	

=== Name changes ===
- Suvarnabhumi Customs were renamed Samut Prakan Customs United.
- Raj Pracha Nonthaburi were renamed Raj Pracha F.C. Thailand
- Chula United were renamed BBCU (Big Bang Chulalongkorn University)
- Rangsit University JW were renamed J.W. Rangsit
- PTT were renamed PTT Rayong

=== Ground changes ===
- Chanthaburi moved from the Chanthaburi Stadium to the Rambhai Barni Rajabhat University Stadium
- BBCU withdrew from the Chulalongkorn University Stadium after an internal dispute which also formed the new RL club Chamchuri United and ground shared with TPL side Army United at the Thai Army Sports Stadium
- Thai Honda moved from the KMITL Sport center football stadium to the Chalermprakiet 72 Sports Center stadium.

== League table ==
Pos	Team	Pld	W	D	L	GF	GA	GD	Pts	Promotion or relegation
1	Buriram	0	0	0	0	0	0	0	0	Promotion to 2012 Thai Premier League
2	Chainat (P)	34	21	3	10	68	42	+26	66	Promotion to 2012 Thai Premier League
3	BBCU (P)	34	18	9	7	39	25	+14	63	Promotion to 2012 Thai Premier League
4	PTT Rayong	34	17	8	9	54	28	+26	59	
5	Songkhla	34	15	11	8	54	39	+15	56	
6	Bangkok United	34	15	6	13	56	52	+4	51	
7	Gulf Saraburi	34	12	14	8	41	31	+10	50	
8	Raj Pracha F.C. Thailand	34	13	7	14	40	55	−15	46	
9	F.C. Phuket	34	11	12	11	45	47	−2	45	
10	Suphanburi	34	10	14	10	40	37	+3	44	
11	Bangkok F.C.	34	13	3	18	56	63	−7	42	
12	Cash Today Chanthaburi	34	11	8	15	39	48	−9	41	
13	J.W. Rangsit	34	10	10	14	31	42	−11	40	
14	Air Force United	34	10	10	14	36	53	−17	40	
15	Samut Prakan Customs United (R)	34	10	6	18	41	55	−14	36	Relegation to the 2012 Regional League Division 2
16	Chiangmai (R)	34	7	9	18	36	55	−19	30	Relegation to the 2012 Regional League Division 2
17	RBAC (R)	34	5	10	19	25	61	−36	25	Relegation to the 2012 Regional League Division 2
18	Thai Honda (R)	34	6	6	22	33	69	−36	24	Relegation to the 2012 Regional League Division 2

Updated to match(es) played on January 26, 2012. Source: Thai Premier League
Rules for classification: 1st points; 2nd head-to-head (only match result, not used aggregate); 3rd match win; 4th goal difference; 5th goals scored.
(P) Promoted; (R) Relegated

== Results ==
Home \ Away	AFU	BAN	BKU	BBC	BUR	CHA	CHN	CHI	PHU	PTT	RPT	JWR	RBA	SAR	SON	SUP	SPC	THO
Air Force United		2–1	2–3	0–1	0–1	1–3	3–2	3–2	1–1	1–1	1–0	2–2	0–1	3–3	0–2	0–0	2–0	0–0
Bangkok F.C.	3–0		1–3	4–1	1–4	3–1	1–2	2–2	5–2 (Note: The match was abandoned in the 82nd minute due to heavy rainfall. The remaining 8 minutes of the match where set to be played at another date, but Phuket decided not to make the 10 hour trip to Bangkok to play 8 minutes and 5–2 victory to Bangkok was ruled as the final result.)	1–2	2–4	2–1	1–1	0–1	1–2	1–2	2–3	3–1
Bangkok United	0–2	1–2		1–1	0–0	2–1	1–2	1–1	2–1	3–2	1–1	1–1	1–5	1–0	1–2	1–2	2–3	3–1
BBCU	3–0	2–1	2–1		0–2	0–1	1–0	1–0	2–1	1–0	2–0	0–0	0–0	1–0	0–0	1–0	4–2	0–0
Buriram	6–1	2–0	0–0	3–0		5–1	5–1	1–0	7–0	1–1	7–1	1–1	3–0	2–0	0–0	2–1	2–1	4–2
Chainat	7–0	1–2	4–2	1–2	2–1		5–0	3–1	3–0	1–0	4–0	2–0	1–0	1–2	2–2	1–1	3–0	5–1
Cash Today Chanthaburi	1–2	2–1	0–2	0–0	0–3	0–1		3–1	1–1	2–1	0–2	0–0	6–1	2–1	2–2	2–1	0–1	0–2
Chiangmai	1–1	1–2	1–1	0–1	2–2	1–2	1–1		1–1	1–2	0–2	2–0	0–1	1–0	2–4	1–1	1–0	1–0
F.C. Phuket	1–1	1–4	1–0	0–0	0–3	4–1	0–2	4–0		3–0	2–0 (Note: Phuket were awarded a 2–0 victory over Rajpracha after Rajpracha fielded 6 foreign players (the quota was 5). The original result was 1–1.)	3–1	2–0	0–2	0–0	0–1	1–0	6–1
PTT Rayong	2–1	1–2	1–2	2–1	0–0	1–1	0–1	1–0	1–0		1–1	0–1	5–0	0–0	5–0	1–0	2–1	6–0
Raj Pracha F.C. Thailand	1–1	1–2	2–4	2–1	0–2	0–1	2–1 (Note: Rajpracha were awarded a 2–0 victory over Chanthaburi after the latter squad left the field of play in the 89th minute and resfused to continue. The score at the time was 2–1 to Rajpracha.)	3–2	0–0	0–3		1–0	1–1	1–0	2–2	2–0	2–1	2–1
J.W. Rangsit	1–0	3–2	1–0	1–3	1–3	1–2	0–2	0–1	1–1	0–1	2–1		0–0	1–1	1–0	1–1	2–1	3–2
RBAC	0–1	0–2	2–2	0–1	0–2	0–1	1–1	1–2	0–1	0–5	0–1	3–2		0–2	1–0	0–4	1–1	0–0
Gulf Saraburi	1–0	3–0	1–1	0–1	0–0	3–1	1–1	1–1	2–2	1–1	1–1	1–0	5–2		1–2	1–1	0–0	1–0
Songkhla	0–2	4–0	0–2	1–1	1–1	1–0	1–0	2–3	0–1	1–1	3–0	2–0	3–0	2–2		1–0	5–1	3–2
Suphanburi	0–0	2–2	0–2	0–0	0–2	3–0	2–2	1–1	1–1	1–2	2–0	1–1	1–1	1–2	2–1		1–0	2–1
Samut Prakan Customs United	0–2	3–0	1–4	1–0	1–3	2–3	1–0	2–1	2–2	0–1	2–3	0–1	1–0	1–1	2–2	2–2		4–0
Thai Honda	3–1	0–1	0–1	1–5	0–2	1–2	1–0	3–1	2–2	0–2	2–1	0–1	3–3	0–0	1–3	0–1	1–2	

Updated to match(es) played on January 26, 2012. Source: Thai Premier League
Legend: Blue = home team win; Yellow = draw; Red = away team win.

== Top scorers ==
Rank	Player	Club	Goals
1	(Thailand) Adisak Srikampang	PTT Rayong	21
1	(Thailand) Phuwadol Suwannachart	Chainat	21
3	(Brazil) Chayene Santos	Songkhla	17
4	(Brazil) Douglas	Buriram	15
5	(Ghana) Samuel Kwaku Danquah	Bangkok	14
5	(Thailand) Suriya Domtaisong	Buriram	14
7	(France) Romain Gasmi	Bangkok United	13
8	(Thailand) Anusak Laosangthai	Air Force United	12
8	(Thailand) Chana Sonwiset	RBAC	12
8	(Thailand) Chainarong Tathong	BBCU	12
8	(Ivory Coast) Kouassi Yao Hermann	Air Force United	12
11	(Thailand) Jirawut Saranun	SPCU	11
11	(England) Lee Tuck	Bangkok	11
11	(Thailand) Rewat Meerian	Raj Pracha	11
11	(Thailand) Sumanya Purisai	Buriram	11
15	(Ivory Coast) Koné Seydou	Buriram	10
15	(Thailand) Narongchai Vachiraban	Chainat	10
17	(South Korea) Choi Jae Won	Saraburi	9
17	(Ivory Coast) Labi Kassiaty	Chanthaburi	9
17	(Thailand) Nantawet Chanuthai	Songkhla	9
17	(Thailand) Nawin Channgam	Raj Pracha	9
17	(Thailand) Pichet In-bang	Suphanburi	9
17	(Thailand) Rattaporn Saetan	Chanthaburi	9

== Attendance ==
Pos	Team	Total	High	Low	Average	Change
1	Songkhla	199,138	36,715	2,976	11,714	n/a
2	Chiangmai	147,637	15,600	4,665	8,685	n/a^{†}
3	Buriram	128,222	12,063	4,967	7,542	n/a^{†}
4	Phuket	83,351	12,420	1,500	4,903	n/a^{†}
5	Chainat	61,611	4,800	2,633	3,624	n/a^{†}
6	PTT Rayong	39,324	4,100	1,301	2,313	n/a
7	Suphanburi	38,835	3,500	0	2,284	n/a
8	Saraburi	35,960	3,622	1,081	2,115	n/a^{†}
9	Chanthaburi	30,197	4,230	940	1,776	n/a
10	Air Force United	23,133	3,370	229	1,361	n/a
11	Bangkok F.C.	15,592	2,000	250	917	n/a^{†}
12	Raj Pracha Thailand	14,825	1,500	450	872	n/a
13	BBCU	13,578	1,690	325	799	n/a
14	RBAC	13,145	4,000	150	773	n/a
15	SPCU	11,805	2,000	300	694	n/a
16	J.W. Rangsit	11,638	1,876	250	685	n/a^{†}
17	Bangkok United	10,568	1,130	155	622	n/a^{‡}
18	Thai Honda	7,838	1,400	120	461	n/a
	League total	886,397	36,715	0	2,897	n/a

Updated to games played on January 26, 2012
Source: Thai Premier League
Notes:
^{†} Team played previous season in Regional League D2.
^{‡} Team played previous season in Premier League.

== See also ==
- 2011 Thai Premier League
- 2011 Regional League Division 2
- 2011 Thai FA Cup
- 2011 Kor Royal Cup
