= 2018 Chiangrai United F.C. season =

Chiangrai United
2018 season
- Chairman: (Thailand) Mitti Tiyapairat
- Head coach: (Brazil) Alexandre Gama
- Stadium: Singha Stadium, Mueang Chiangrai, Chiangrai, Thailand
- Thai League: 5th
- Thai FA Cup: Winners
- Thai League Cup: Winners
- Thailand Champions Cup: Winners
- AFC Champions League: Play-off round
- Top goalscorer: League: Bill (9); All: Bill (22)
- All statistics correct as of 27 October 2018.

The 2018 season is Chiangrai United Football Club's 10th existence. It is the 3rd season in the Thai League and the club's 8th consecutive season in the top flight of the Thai football league system since promoted in the 2011 season.

== League by seasons ==
Season	League	Position	Notes
2009	Regional League Division 2 Northern region	1st	* Found * Promoted to Thai Division 1 League
2010	Thai Division 1 League	3rd	Promoted to Thai Premier League
2011	Thai Premier League	10th	
2012	Thai Premier League	9th	
2013	Thai Premier League	11th	
2014	Thai Premier League	7th	
2015	Thai Premier League	9th	
2016	Thai League	8th	Thai Premier League renamed to Thai League
2017	Thai League	4th	
2018	Thai League	5th	

== Competitions ==
=== Thailand Champions Cup ===
The 2018 Thailand Champions Cup. It features Buriram United the winners of the 2017 Thai League and Chiangrai United the winners of the 2017 Thai FA Cup. It features at Supachalasai Stadium.

Date	Opponents	H / A	Result F–A	Scorers
19 January 2018	Buriram United	N	2–2 (6–5p)	Sivakorn 45+2', Victor 67'

=== Thai League ===
Date	Opponents	H / A	Result F–A	Scorers	League position
10 February 2018	Chonburi	H	1–0	Victor 39'	6th
18 February 2018	Sukhothai	A	0–2		13th
25 February 2018	Police Tero	H	1–1	Nebihi 15'	10th
3 March 2018	SCG Muangthong United	A	1–1	Sivakorn 12'	12th
11 March 2018	Ratchaburi Mitr Phol	H	2–0	Nebihi (2) 29', 70'	8th
17 March 2018	Suphanburi	A	0–2		10th
28 March 2018	Chainat Hornbill	H	1–2	Cleiton 64'	12th
1 April 2018	Bangkok United	A	1–0	Victor 57'	10th
7 April 2018	Pattaya United	H	1–0	Victor 4'	9th
11 April 2018	Air Force Central	A	2–0	Cleiton 27', Kapisoda 78' (o.g.)	6th
22 April 2018	Buriram United	H	1–0	Victor 37'	3rd
25 April 2018	PT Prachuap	A	2–4	Cleiton 49' (pen.), Phitiwat 87'	5th
28 April 2018	Port	A	1–2	Cleiton 83' (pen.)	11th
5 May 2018	Bangkok Glass	H	1–1	Victor 21'	7th
12 May 2018	Navy	A	6–3	Apisorn 18', Victor 32', Panuwat 36' (o.g.), Piyaphon 40', Sivakorn 49', Cleiton 70' (pen.)	5th
18 May 2018	Ubon UMT United	A	3–0	Chaiyawat 32', Sivakorn 65', Suriya 72'	5th
26 May 2018	Nakhon Ratchasima Mazda	H	1–2	Chaiyawat 4'	6th
9 June 2018	Sukhothai	H	4–0	Sivakorn 54', Suriya 59', William 73', Akarawin 80'	6th
16 June 2018	Police Tero	A	1–1	Bill 77'	6th
24 June 2018	SCG Muangthong United	H	0–3		6th
1 July 2018	Ratchaburi Mitr Phol	A	4–0	Phitiwat 15', Bill 73', Sivakorn 78', Akarawin 89'	6th
8 July 2018	Suphanburi	H	2–1	Bill 23' (pen.), William 71'	6th
14 July 2018	Chainat Hornbill	A	1–0	Bill 28'	5th
21 July 2018	Bangkok United	H	1–2	Sivakorn 3'	6th
29 July 2018	Pattaya United	A	0–0		5th
4 August 2018	Air Force Central	H	1–1	Bill 46'	6th
5 September 2018	Buriram United	A	0–1		6th
9 September 2018	PT Prachuap	H	3–2	Victor 6', Chaiyawat 16', Akarawin 72'	6th
12 September 2018	Port	H	2–0	Phitiwat 4', Bill 90+1'	5th
15 September 2018	Bangkok Glass	A	0–0		5th
23 September 2018	Navy	H	2–2	Akarawin 5', Bill 70'	5th
30 September 2018	Ubon UMT United	H	4–1	Shinnaphat 25', Bill (2) 37', 81', Phitiwat 54'	5th
3 October 2018	Nakhon Ratchasima Mazda	A	1–1	Sarawut Masuk 45'	5th
7 October 2018	Chonburi	A	1–1	Sivakorn 27'	5th

Pos	Team	Pld	W	D	L	GF	GA	GD	Pts	Qualification or relegation
3	Port	34	19	4	11	73	45	+28	61	
4	Muangthong United	34	16	11	7	65	53	+12	59	
5	Chiangrai United (Q)	34	15	10	9	52	36	+16	55	Qualification to 2019 AFC Champions League Preliminary round 2 (Note: Chiangrai United qualified to the 2019 AFC Champions League Preliminary round 2 as winners of the 2018 Thai FA Cup.)
6	Prachuap	34	15	8	11	56	46	+10	53	
7	Nakhon Ratchasima	34	13	8	13	36	44	−8	47	

Source: Thai League
Rules for classification: 1) Points; 2) Head-to-head points; 3) Head-to-head goals difference; 4) Head-to-head goals scored; 5) Overall goals difference; 6) Overall goals scored; 7) Fair play points; 8) Play-off without extra time;).
(Q) Qualified for the phase indicated

=== Thai FA Cup ===
Date	Opponents	H / A	Result F–A	Scorers	Round
27 June 2018	Nakhon Ratchasima Mazda	A	1–0	Victor 41'	Round of 64
4 July 2018	Air Force Central	H	2–0	Bill (2) 8', 59' (pen.)	Round of 32
25 July 2018	SCG Muangthong United	H	0–0 (a.e.t.) (5–4p)		Round of 16
1 August 2018	Nara United	A	5–0	William 32', Sivakorn 35', Bill (2) 50', 85', Chaiyawat 84'	Quarter-finals
26 September 2018	Ratchaburi Mitr Phol	N	3–1 (a.e.t.)	Sarawut 89', William 112', Bill 120+1'	Semi-finals
27 October 2018	Buriram United	N	3–2	Bill (3) 2', 43' (pen.), 72'	Final

=== Thai League Cup ===
Date	Opponents	H / A	Result F–A	Scorers	Round
13 June 2018	Army United	A	6–1	Victor 2', Sarawut 12', Piyaphon 18', Yong-rae 43', Bill (2) 45+2', 72' (pen.)	Round of 32
11 July 2018	Police Tero	H	4–2	William 15', Bill (3) 29', 70', 75'	Round of 16
8 August 2018	Air Force Central	H	1–0	Sivakorn 69'	Quarter-finals
19 September 2018	Nakhon Ratchasima Mazda	N	1–1 (a.e.t.) (3–1p)	Chaiyawat 11'	Semi-finals
20 October 2018	Bangkok Glass	N	1–0	William 65'	Final

=== AFC Champions League ===
Qualifying play-offs

Date	Opponents	H / A	Result F–A	Scorers	Round
23 January 2018	(Indonesia) Bali United	H	2–1 (a.e.t.)	Akarawin 94', Pathompol 105'	Preliminary round 2
30 January 2018	(China) Shanghai SIPG	A	0–1		Play-off round
