= Tathong (disambiguation) =

Tathong may refer to:

- Tathong Channel, the eastern sea waters in Hong Kong leading into Victoria Harbour through Lei Yue Mun
- Chainarong Tathong, Thai footballer
- Wuttichai Tathong, Thai footballer
