= 2010 Thai Division 1 League =

Thai Division 1 League
- Season: 2010
- Champions: Sriracha
- Promoted: Sriracha; Khonkaen; Chiangrai United
- Relegated: Prachinburi; Narathiwat
- Matches: 240
- Goals: 669 (2.79 per match)
- Top goalscorer: (Thailand) Chainarong Tathong (19 goals)
- Biggest home win: Suvarnabhumi Customs 7–0 Narathiwat (29 September 2010); Sriracha 7–0 Narathiwat (23 October 2010)
- Biggest away win: PTT 0–5 Air Force United (18 April 2010); Raj Pracha-Nonthaburi 1–6 Chula United (19 June 2010)
- Highest scoring: Sriracha 5–2 Chula United (27 March 2010); Songkhla 2–5 Khonkaen (9 May 2010); Raj Pracha-Nonthaburi 1–6 Chula United (19 June 2010); RBAC Mittraphap 3–4 Nakhon Pathom (14 August 2010); PTT 4–3 Songkhla (17 August 2010); Suvarnabhumi Customs 4–3 RBAC Mittraphap (18 August 2010); Suvarnabhumi Customs 7–0 Narathiwat (29 September 2010); Nakhon Pathom 5–2 Narathiwat (2 October 2010); Suphanburi 4–3 Chula United (16 October 2010); Sriracha 7–0 Narathiwat (23 October 2010) (7 goals)

2010 Thai League Division 1 is the 13th season of the League since its establishment in 1997. It is the feeder league for the Thai Premier League. A total of 16 teams will compete in the league.

== League Expansion ==
It was announced at the end of the season that the TPL would increase the number of teams for the start of the 2011 Thai Premier League season. Therefore, at the end of season the three teams in the Thai Premier League that finished the season in the bottom three places (14th, 15th and 16th) would face the fourth, fifth and sixth teams from Division One in a promotion/relegation series.

The six teams will be divided into two groups of three. They will meet each other in their group on a home-and-away basis with the winner of each group earning spots in the top flight next season.

It was also announced somewhat belatedly that the teams that finished in the bottom four places, who would normally be relegated would play in an end of season promotion/relegation series against the teams coming 3rd and 4th in the 2010 Regional League Division 2 championship stage. Games would be played on a home and away basis to decide who would play in the 2011 Thai Division 1 League.

== Changes from last season ==
=== Team changes ===
==== From Division 1 ====
Promoted to Thai Premier League

- Police United
- Royal Thai Army
- Sisaket

Relegated to Regional League Division 2

- Nakhon Sawan
- Thai Airways-Ban Bueng
- Surat Thani

Relegated from Thai Premier League

- Sriracha
- Chula United
- Nakhon Pathom

Promoted from Regional League Division 2

- Raj Pracha-Nonthaburi
- Chiangrai United
- Narathiwat

== Teams ==
=== Stadia and locations ===
Locations of the Thai Division 1 League 2010 teams
Football clubs in Bangkok Metropolitan Region

Team	Location	Stadium	Capacity	Kit manufacturer	Shirt sponsor	Ref.
Air Force United	Pathum Thani	Thupatemee Stadium	20,000	Kela Sport	Group Avia	
Chanthaburi	Chanthaburi	Chanthaburi Province Stadium	5,000	Grand Sport	Cash Today	
Chiangrai United	Chiang Rai	Chiangrai Province Stadium	?		LEO Beer	
Chula United	Bangkok	Chulalongkorn University Sports Stadium	15,000		3BB	
Khonkaen	Khonkaen	Khon Kaen Stadium	10,000	Kool Sport	Chang Beer	
Nakhon Pathom	Nakhon Pathom	Kasetsart Kampangsan University Stadium	3,500	Pan	Victory Insurance	
Narathiwat	Narathiwat	Narathiwat Municipal Stadium	?	FBT	Air Asia	
Prachinburi	Prachinburi	Prachinburi Province Stadium	3,500	Tamudo	Euro Custard	
PTT Rayong	Rayong	Rayong Stadium	14,000	Pan	PTT	
Raj Pracha-Nonthaburi	Nonthaburi	Yamaha Stadium	18,000	Nigh Sports	Chang Beer	
RBAC Mittraphap	Bangkok	RBAC University Stadium	1,000	Deffo		
Songkhla	Songkhla	Chira Nakhon Stadium (1) Na Thawi District Stadium (2)	25,000 2,000	Diadora		
Sriracha	Chonburi	Sriracha Stadium	?	FBT	Chang Beer	
Suphanburi	Suphanburi	Suphanburi Sports School Stadium	25,000	Deffo	Lotus cement	
Suvarnabhumi Customs	Samut Prakan	Lad Krabang 54 Stadium	3,500	Deffo	Double A	
Thai Honda	Lat Krabang, Bangkok Min Buri, Bangkok	King Mongkut's Institute of Technology Ladkrabang Stadium 72nd Anniversary Stadium	3,000 10,000	Deffo	Honda	

=== Name Changes ===
- Customs Department were renamed Suvarnabhumi Customs.
- Rattana Bundit were renamed RBAC Mittraphap.
- Royal Thai Air Force rebranded and renamed Air Force United.

== League table ==
Pos	Team	Pld	W	D	L	GF	GA	GD	Pts	Promotion or relegation
1	Sriracha (C, P)	30	19	5	6	62	33	+29	62	Promotion to 2011 Thai Premier League
2	Khonkaen (P)	30	15	9	6	51	35	+16	54	Promotion to 2011 Thai Premier League
3	Chiangrai United (P)	30	15	8	7	44	32	+12	53	Promotion to 2011 Thai Premier League
4	Songkhla	30	14	9	7	47	34	+13	51	Qualification to the Promotion playoffs
5	Nakhon Pathom	30	12	15	3	55	36	+19	51	Qualification to the Promotion playoffs
6	Air Force United	30	13	9	8	48	33	+15	48	Qualification to the Promotion playoffs
7	Suvarnabhumi Customs	30	12	9	9	42	37	+5	45	
8	Thai Honda	30	11	7	12	32	32	0	40	
9	Raj Pracha-Nonthaburi	30	11	6	13	33	40	−7	39	
10	Chula United	30	10	8	12	59	48	+11	38	
11	PTT	30	9	11	10	47	51	−4	38	
12	Chanthaburi	30	9	10	11	38	40	−2	37	
13	Prachinburi	30	10	5	15	29	36	−7	35	Qualification to the Promotion/relegation playoffs
14	RBAC	30	7	6	17	35	65	−30	27	Qualification to the Promotion/relegation playoffs
15	Suphanburi	30	5	8	17	31	53	−22	23	Qualification to the Promotion/relegation playoffs
16	Nara United	30	4	3	23	16	64	−48	15	Qualification to the Promotion/relegation playoffs

Updated to match(es) played on 23 October 2010. Source: Thai Premier League Co., Ld
Rules for classification: 1st points; 2nd head-to-head (only match result, not used aggregate); 3rd match win; 4th goal difference; 5th goals scored.
(C) Champions; (P) Promoted

=== TPL/Division 1 Playoffs ===
==== Group A ====
Team	Pld	W	D	L	GF	GA	GD	Pts
Sisaket	4	2	2	0	4	1	+3	8
Nakhon Pathom (Note: Nakhon Pathom were suspended for two years following the final playoff game, all results stood.)	4	2	1	1	5	3	+2	7
Air Force United	4	0	1	3	2	7	−5	1

Notes:
27 November 2010
17:30 UTC+7

Air Force United	0–0	Sisaket

Thupatemee Stadium, Bangkok
Referee: Sakda Phansut
4 December 2010
15:30 UTC+7

Sisaket	2–0	Nakhon Pathom
Amaro 15'; Piyawat 48'

Sri Nakhon Lamduan Stadium, Sisaket
Referee: Badin Bounduelan
11 December 2010
16:00 UTC+7

Nakhon Pathom	3–0	Air Force United

Kasetsart Kampangsan University Stadium, Nakhon Pathom
Referee: Sumaet Saiwaew
18 December 2010
17:30 UTC+7

Air Force United	1–2	Nakhon Pathom
Kritsana 42'		Nirut 30'; Phuwadol 74'

Thupatemee Stadium, Bangkok
Referee: Surasak Kundiloksirodom
25 December 2010
16:00 UTC+7

Nakhon Pathom	0–0	Sisaket
Chalermsuk (yellow card) 58' (yellow-red card); Thanasith (yellow card) 80' (yellow-red card)		Divine (yellow card) 55' (yellow-red card)

Kasetsart Kampangsan University Stadium, Nakhon Pathom
Referee: Apisit Aonrak
31 December 2010
15:30 UTC+7

Sisaket	2–1	Air Force United
Wuttichai 36'; Y.D.Kim 48'		Yuttana J. 71'

Sri Nakhon Lamduan Stadium, Sisaket
Referee: Sura Sriart

==== Group B ====
Team	Pld	W	D	L	GF	GA	GD	Pts
Army United (Note: Royal Thai Army renamed to Army United)	4	2	2	0	5	1	+4	8
Bangkok United	4	1	2	1	3	3	0	5
Songkhla	4	0	2	2	2	6	−4	2

Notes:
27 November 2010
18:00 UTC+7

Bangkok United	0–2	Army United
Rungroj (red card) 67'		Trakoolchat 37'; Tatree 57'

Bangkok University Stadium, Bangkok
Attendance: 751
Referee: Apisit Aonrak
3 December 2010
18:00 UTC+7

Army United	2–0	Songkhla
Tatree 68'; Nipol 81'

Thai Army Sports Stadium, Bangkok
Referee: Surapol Sawangjit
9 December 2010
16:00 UTC+7

Songkhla	0–2	Bangkok United
		Kornwit 37'; Kittisak 42'

Nathawee Municipality Stadium, Songkhla
Referee: Sura Sriart
13 December 2010
18:00 UTC+7

Army United	0–0	Bangkok United

Thai Army Sports Stadium, Bangkok
Referee: Mongkolchai Pradsri
19 December 2010
18:00 UTC+7

Songkhla	1–1	Army United
Witthawat 6'		Nipol 65'

Nathawee Municipality Stadium, Songkhla
25 December 2010
17:00 UTC+7

Bangkok United	1–1	Songkhla
Paramed 20'		Chaiyarat 50'

Bangkok University Stadium, Bangkok
Referee: Prathan Nasawang

== Results ==
Winners over two legs progress to the 2011 Division One league season, losers go to the Regional League

Team 1	Agg.	Team 2	1st leg	2nd leg
Prachinburi	0–1	Rangsit University JW	0–1	0–0
Suphanburi	3–2	Saraburi	2–1	1–1
RBAC Mittraphap	4–2	Rayong	2–1	2–1
Narathiwat	2–11	Bangkok	1–7	1–4

== Results ==
Home \ Away	AFU	CHN	CHR	CHL	KHK	NKP	NAR	PRB	PTT	RPN	RBA	SON	SRR	SUP	SUV	HON
Air Force United		2–1	1–3	2–0	1–2	1–1	1–0	1–0	2–0	2–1	2–2	1–0	1–1	5–0	1–1	2–1
Chanthaburi	2–2		1–1	3–0	0–2	1–1	0–1	2–0	3–2	0–2	1–1	1–1	2–3	1–0	1–1	1–1
Chiangrai United	2–1	2–0		2–1	1–3	1–1	3–1	1–0	1–1	2–1	2–0	1–1	1–0	4–0	0–2	4–1
Chula United	0–1	2–3	3–0		1–1	2–2	4–1	3–3	2–2	1–0	3–0	0–0	2–1	5–1	6–0	1–1
Khonkaen	1–2	2–0	0–0	2–1		0–0	2–1	2–1	2–4	2–0	4–1	2–1	3–1	2–0	3–3	2–1
Nakhon Pathom	1–1	2–1	2–1	0–0	1–1		5–2	2–1	2–2	1–2	3–0	3–0	3–0	2–2	0–0	1–1
Narathiwat	2–1	1–3	0–1	1–0	1–0	1–3		0–1	0–0	0–1	1–3	2–2	1–2	0–0	0–1	0–1
Prachinburi	2–1	0–0	0–1	3–1	0–0	2–3	1–0		1–2	2–1	1–0	1–1	1–2	1–0	2–0	1–0
PTT Rayong	0–5	1–3	2–2	1–4	0–0	3–3	3–0	1–0		1–1	5–1	4–3	0–1	2–0	2–0	1–1
Raj Pracha	1–0	0–1	1–1	1–6	1–1	1–1	2–0	2–0	3–3		4–0	1–3	1–2	2–1	1–0	0–1
RBAC	1–3	3–3	2–1	4–2	1–3	3–4	1–0	1–1	2–0	1–2		1–1	1–5	1–0	1–1	0–0
Songkhla	3–2	1–0	2–0	2–1	2–5	2–1	3–0	2–0	2–2	4–0	1–0		1–1	2–0	2–1	3–1
Sriracha	1–1	3–1	3–0	5–2	4–0	3–2	7–0	3–2	2–1	0–0	3–0	1–0		1–0	1–2	1–2
Suphanburi	3–3	2–1	2–2	4–3	2–2	0–0	4–0	2–0	1–2	0–1	3–1	1–1	1–2		1–4	0–1
Suvarnabhumi Customs	0–0	0–0	0–3	1–1	1–0	1–3	7–0	2–2	2–0	3–0	4–3	1–0	1–2	1–0		0–1
Thai Honda	1–0	1–2	0–1	1–2	3–2	1–2	2–0	0–1	2–0	1–0	3–0	0–1	1–1	1–1	1–2	

Source: Thai Premier League Co., Ld
Legend: Blue = home team win; Yellow = draw; Red = away team win.

== Top scorers ==
Rank	Scorer	Club	Goals
1	(Thailand) Chainarong Tathong	Chula United	19
2	(Brazil) Aron da Silva	Chula United	15
2	(Thailand) Pornchai Ardjinda	Air Force United	15
4	(Argentina) Raúl Goález Gastón	Sriracha	14
5	(Thailand) Phuwadol Suwannachart	Nakhon Pathom	13
5	(Thailand) Wasan Natasan	Chiangrai United	13
7	(Thailand) Choklap Nilsang	Suvarnabhumi Customs	12
7	(Thailand) Nantawet Chanuthai	Songkhla	12
7	(Burkina Faso) Valéry Sanou	Sriracha	12

== See also ==
- 2010 Thai Premier League
- 2010 Regional League Division 2
- 2010 Thai FA Cup
- 2010 Kor Royal Cup
