= Thawiwatthana F.C. =

Thai football club

Thawiwatthana-Sriracha ทวีวัฒนา-ศรีราชา เอฟซี
- Full name: Thawiwatthana-Sriracha Football Club สโมสรฟุตบอลทวีวัฒนา-ศรีราชา
- Nicknames: Killer King Cobra (จงอางพิฆาต)
- Founded: 2005, as Srirachai-Sannibat Samutprakan Football Club
- Dissolved: 2018
- Ground: Suan Sunandha Rajabhat University Salaya Campus Stadium; Nakhon Pathom, Thailand
- Capacity: 3,000
Home colours	Away colours

Thawiwatthana Football Club (Thai: สโมสรฟุตบอลทวีวัฒนา), better known as old name Sriracha FC (Thai: สโมสรฟุตบอลศรีราชา), is a Thai defunct professional football club based in Nakhon Pathom.

The club played their home games at the Suan Sunandha Rajabhat University Salaya Campus Stadium in Nakhon Pathom. They traditionally played in pink and blue. The club's official logo had a king cobra, hence their nickname the Killer King Cobra.

== Yo-Yo club ==
The club has somewhat become known as a yo-yo club in the Thai football scene, being relegated and promoted to and from the top flight on five successive occasions between 2008 and 2012. The sequence was broken in 2012 when they finished one place off the promotion spots in the 2012 Division 1 race.

== Stadium and locations by season records ==
Coordinates	Location	Stadium	Year
13°09′49″N 100°56′25″E	Chonburi	Princess Sirindhorn Stadium; Assumption College Sriracha Stadium	2007–2009
13°10′20″N 100°55′41″E	Chonburi	Suzuki Stadium (Sriracha)	2010–2013
13°24′41″N 100°59′37″E	Chonburi	Institute of Physical Education Chonburi Campus Stadium	2014
13°52′05″N 100°16′13″E	Nakhon Pathom	Suan Sunandha Rajabhat University Salaya Campus Stadium	2015
13°46′10″N 100°20′44″E	Thawi Watthana, Bangkok	Bangkok-Thonburi University Stadium	2015–2016
13°52′05″N 100°16′13″E	Nakhon Pathom	Suan Sunandha Rajabhat University Salaya Campus Stadium	2017–2018

== Season by season record ==
Season	League									FA Cup	League Cup	Top goalscorer	
Season	Division	P	W	D	L	F	A	Pts	Pos	FA Cup	League Cup	Name	Goals
2007	DIV1	22	7	8	7	20	20	29	6th				
2008	DIV1	30	16	9	5	40	22	57	2nd			Raúl González Gastón	9
2009	TPL	30	8	8	16	28	34	30	14th	R4		Raúl González Gastón	7
2010	DIV1	30	19	5	6	62	33	62	1st	R4		Raúl González Gastón	14
2011	TPL	34	7	11	16	32	43	32	17th	QF		Aron da Silva	10
2012	DIV1	34	21	4	9	70	41	67	4th	R2		Anuwat Nakkaseam	18
2013	DIV1	34	10	7	17	48	53	37	15th	R2		Berlin Ndebe-Nlome	15
2014	DIV1	34	0	3	31	19	90	3	18th	R2		Boonkerd Chaiyasin	6
2015	Central & East	26	4	8	14	28	44	20	12th				1st Qualification
2016	Collapsed												
2017	TA Central	7	5	1	1	27	9	16	2nd	Not Enter			Can't Enter

Champions	Runners-up	Third place	Promoted	Relegated

- P = Played
- W = Games won
- D = Games drawn
- L = Games lost
- F = Goals for
- A = Goals against
- Pts = Points
- Pos = Final position
- TPL = Thai Premier League
- QR1 = First Qualifying Round
- QR2 = Second Qualifying Round
- QR3 = Third Qualifying Round
- QR4 = Fourth Qualifying Round
- RInt = Intermediate Round
- R1 = Round 1
- R2 = Round 2
- R3 = Round 3
- R4 = Round 4
- R5 = Round 5
- R6 = Round 6
- GR = Group stage
- QF = Quarter-finals
- SF = Semi-finals
- RU = Runners-up
- S = Shared
- W = Winners

== Honours ==
=== Domestic leagues ===
- Thailand Division 1 League:
  - Winners (1): 2010
  - Runners-up (1): 2008
