= Cleiton Silva =

Brazilian footballer (born 1987)

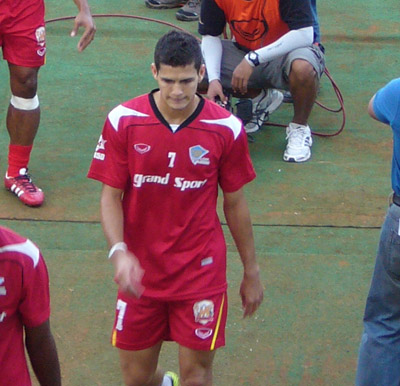

Personal information
- Full name: Cleiton Augusto Oliveira Silva
- Date of birth: 3 February 1987 (age 39)
- Place of birth: São Geraldo da Piedade, Minas Gerais, Brazil
- Height: 1.75 m (5 ft 9 in)
- Position: Forward

Youth career
- 2007–2008: Madureira

Senior career*
Years	Team	Apps	(Gls)
2008–2009	Madureira	57	(39)
2010–2011	Osotspa	38	(25)
2012–2013	BEC Tero Sasana	64	(45)
2013–2014	Delfines	8	(3)
2014–2017	Muangthong United	79	(57)
2017	Shanghai Shenxin	26	(17)
2018	Chiangrai United	17	(12)
2018	→ Suphanburi (loan)	12	(9)
2019	Suphanburi	30	(11)
2020–2022	Bengaluru	37	(16)
2022–2025	East Bengal	80	(27)
Total		448	(261)
- * Club domestic league appearances and goals as of 00:41, 7 July 2026 (UTC)

Cleiton Augusto Oliveira Silva (born 3 February 1987) is a Brazilian former professional footballer who most recently played as a forward. He is the third-highest all-time goal scorer in the Thai League 1.

== Career ==
=== BEC Tero Sasana ===
Silva's career took off in the 2012 season when incoming head coach Andrew Ord signed him to BEC Tero Sasana on a three-year deal. In his first season Cleiton won the 2012 Thai Premier League Golden boot with 24 goals with Teerasil Dangda.

In 2013 he won the 2013 Thai Premier League Player of the month march and the striker of the year award.

=== Muangthong United ===
After short unsuccessful spell with Delfines in Mexico, in late 2014 he signed for Muangthong United in Thai Premier League and scored five goals during the second leg of the 2014 Thai Premier League. With a hat-trick in a 3–0 win over in the 2016 season Silva became the first foreigner to score 100 league goals in Thailand.

=== Shanghai Shenxin ===
Silva transferred to China League One side Shanghai Shenxin.

=== Bengaluru FC ===
In June 2020, Silva signed for Indian Super League club Bengaluru FC for one-year deal, with an option to extend for another year.

=== East Bengal ===
In August 2022, Silva was announced as one of the five foreigners signed by East Bengal for the upcoming season.

On 28 August, he made his debut against Kolkata derby rival ATK Mohun Bagan in the Durand Cup, which ended in a narrow 1–0 loss. He came on as a half-time substitute for compatriot Eliandro. Six days later, he scored his first two goals for the club against Mumbai City, in a thrilling 4–3 win. He perfectly executed a free-kick and later the winner in the 81st-minute to hand East Bengal their first competitive win after seven months. On 16 April 2025 his contract was terminated by East Bengal after altercation with head coach Óscar Bruzón.

== Career statistics ==
As of match played 20 June 2024

Appearances and goals by club, season and competition
Club	Season	League			National cup (Note: Includes Copa MX, Thai FA Cup, Chinese FA Cup, Super Cup)		Continental		Other		Total	
Club	Season	Division	Apps	Goals	Apps	Goals	Apps	Goals	Apps	Goals	Apps	Goals
Madureira	2008	Série D	37	15	—		—		—		37	15
Madureira	2009	Série D	37	15	—		—		—		37	15
Osotspa	2010	Thai Premier League	15	7	—		—		—		15	7
Osotspa	2011	Thai Premier League	23	10	—		—		—		23	10
Osotspa	Total		38	17	—		—		—		38	17
BEC Tero; Sasana	2012	Thai Premier League	33	25	—		—		—		33	25
BEC Tero; Sasana	2013	Thai Premier League	31	20	—		—		—		31	20
BEC Tero; Sasana	Total		64	45	—		—		—		64	45
Delfines (loan)	2013–14	Ascenso MX	8	1	2	1	—		—		10	2
Muangthong; United	2014	Thai Premier League	14	4	—		—		—		14	4
Muangthong; United	2015	Thai Premier League	33	25	6	6	—		2 (Note: Appearances in Thai League Cup)	1	41	32
Muangthong; United	2016	Thai League T1	30	27	3	3	2 (Note: Appearances in AFC Champions League)	0	4	3	39	33
Muangthong; United	2017	Thai League T1	2	1	—		—		1 (Note: Appearances in Thailand Champions Cup)	2	3	3
Muangthong; United	Total		79	57	9	9	2	0	7	6	97	72
Shanghai Shenxin	2017	China League One	26	17	5	3	—		—		31	20
Chiangrai United	2018	Thai League 1	17	5	—		2	0	1	0	20	5
Suphanburi (loan)	2018	Thai League 1	12	9	—		—		—		12	9
Suphanburi	2019	Thai League 1	30	11	—		—		—		30	11
Bengaluru	2020–21	Indian Super League	18	7	—		1 (Note: Appearances in AFC Cup)	2	—		19	9
Bengaluru	2021–22	Indian Super League	19	9	—		4	1	—		23	10
Bengaluru	Total		37	16	—		5	3	—		42	19
East Bengal	2022–23	Indian Super League	20	12	3	0	—		2 (Note: Appearances in Durand Cup)	2	25	14
East Bengal	2023–24	Indian Super League	21	8	5	5	—		4	0	30	13
East Bengal	2024–25	Indian Super League	0	0	0	0	0	0	0	0	0	0
East Bengal	Total		41	20	8	5	—		6	2	55	27
Career total			389	213	24	18	9	3	14	8	436	242

== Honours ==
Muangthong United

- Thai League 1: 2016
- Thai League Cup: 2016
- Thailand Champions Cup: 2017

Chiangrai United

- Thailand Champions Cup: 2018

East Bengal

- Super Cup: 2024
- Durand Cup runner-up: 2023

Individual

- Thai Premier League Top Scorer: 2012, 2016
- Thai Premier League Striker of the Year: 2013
- Super Cup Highest Goalscorer: 2024
- Thai Premier League Player of the Month: March 2013
