= Tanongsak Promdard =

Thai footballer (born 1985)

Personal information
- Full name: Tanongsak Promdard
- Date of birth: 30 March 1985 (age 41)
- Place of birth: Nakhon Sawan, Thailand
- Height: 1.85 m (6 ft 1 in)
- Position: Striker

Team information
- Current team: Angthong
- Number: 22

Senior career*
Years	Team	Apps	(Gls)
2008	Raj-Vithi	27	(18)
2009	TTM Phichit	14	(2)
2010–2013	Chainat	24	(13)
2014–2015	Saraburi	11	(3)
2016	Lampang	19	(2)
2017	Air Force Central	12	(1)
2018	Pattaya United	0	(0)
2018	Angthong	0	(0)
2019–	Chainat United	14	(5)

International career
2004	Thailand	1	(0)
- * Club domestic league appearances and goals as of 27 July 2019

Tanongsak Promdard (Thai: ทนงศักดิ์ พรมดาด; born 30 March 1985), simply known as A (Thai: เอ), is a Thai professional footballer. He currently plays for Chainat United F.C. in the Thai League 4.

== International career ==
=== International ===
As of 12 November 2015

National team	Year	Apps	Goals
Thailand	2004	1	0
Thailand	Total	1	0

=== Individual ===
- Thailand Division 1 League Golden Boot: 2008
