= Naphat Jaruphatphakdee =

Thai footballer (born 1995)

Personal information
- Date of birth: 21 December 1995 (age 30)
- Place of birth: Sisaket, Thailand
- Height: 1.77 m (5 ft 9 1/2 in)
- Position: Centre-back

Team information
- Current team: Chainat Hornbill
- Number: 2

Youth career
- 2012–2015: Muangthong United

Senior career*
Years	Team	Apps	(Gls)
2016	Assumption United	14	(0)
2016	BBCU	10	(0)
2017	Bangkok		
2017	Samut Sakhon		
2018–2019	Ubon UMT	16	(0)
2020–2025	Rayong	68	(1)
2025	→ Chanthaburi (loan)	14	(0)
2025–2026	Chanthaburi	18	(0)
2026–	Chainat Hornbill	0	(0)
- * Club domestic league appearances and goals as of 10 April 2026

Naphat Jaruphatphakdee (Thai: ณภัทร จารุภัทรภักดี, born December 21, 1995) is a Thai professional footballer who plays as a centre-back. He currently plays for Chainat Hornbill in the Thai League 2.
