= Jarun Burapharat Stadium =

Multi-purpose venue in Bangkok, Thailand

Coordinates: 13.750398°N 100.567119°E

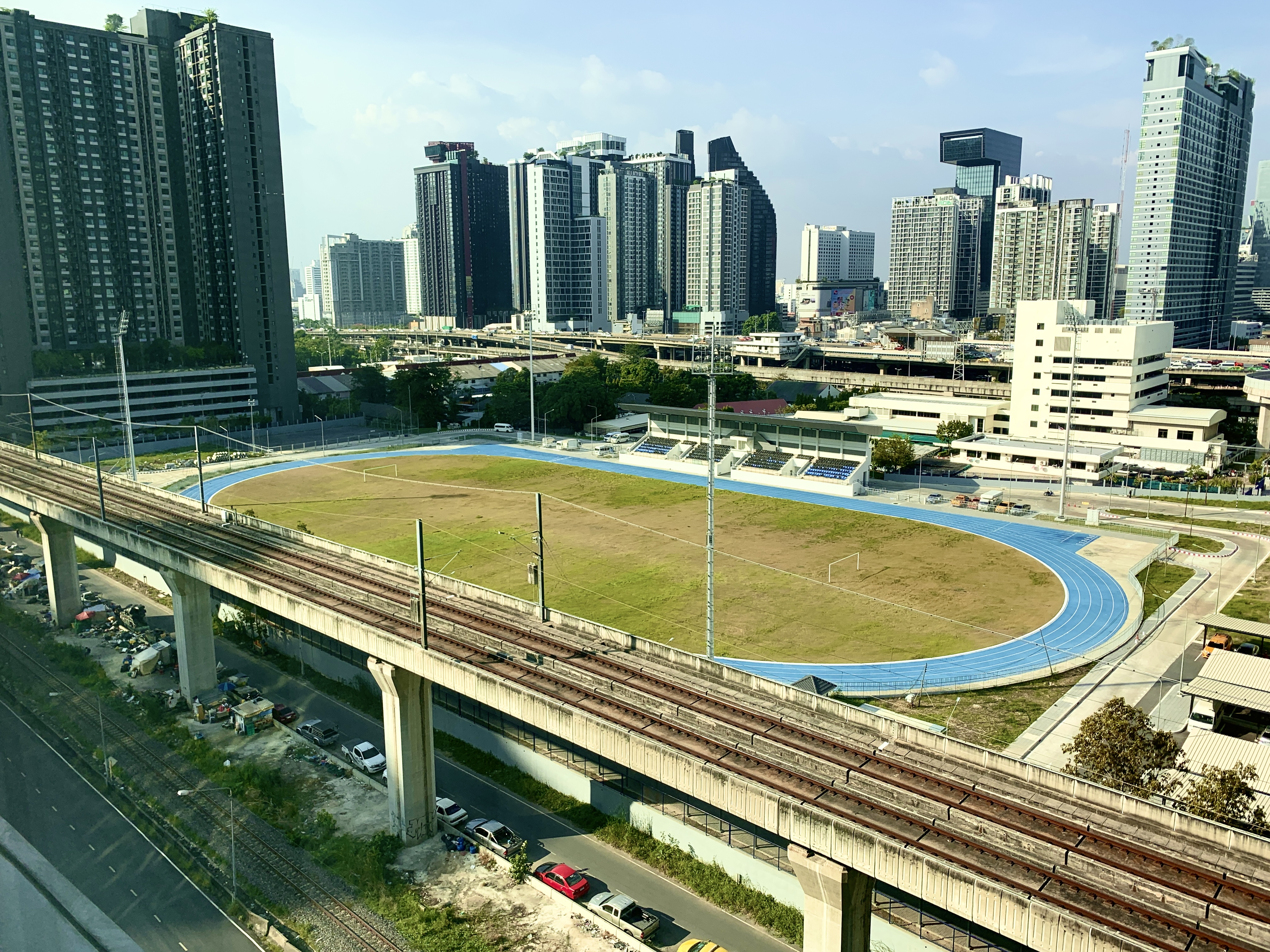
- Interactive map of Jarun Burapharat Stadium
- Location: Bangkok, Thailand
- Owner: Expressway Authority of Thailand
- Operator: Expressway Authority of Thailand
- Capacity: ?
- Surface: Grass

Jarun Burapharat Stadium (Thai: สนามจรัญบุรพรัตน์) is a multi-purpose venue in Bangkok, Thailand. It hosted matches of PTT F.C. in the 2008 Thailand League Division 1. In 2017, it is used for occasional music concerts such as the "Chang Music Connection Musictropolis".
