= Phuwadol Suwannachart =

Thai footballer

Personal information
- Full name: Phuwadol Suwannachart
- Date of birth: 20 June 1982 (age 44)
- Place of birth: Sisaket, Thailand
- Height: 1.76 m (5 ft 9 1/2 in)
- Position: Striker

Senior career*
Years	Team	Apps	(Gls)
2006–2008	TOT	56	(17)
2009	BEC Tero Sasana	9	(6)
2010	Muangkan	12	(5)
2010	Nakhon Pathom	9	(8)
2011–2013	Chainat	82	(24)
2014–2015	Ratchaburi Mitr Phol	34	(4)
2015–2016	Chiangmai	28	(10)
2016	Sisaket	24	(8)
2017	Krabi	13	(2)
2017	Samutsongkhram	4	(0)
2018	Ayutthaya United	8	(1)
2018	Ubon Ratchathani	3	(0)
2019	Chainat United	10	(1)
2020	Chiangrai City	5	(0)
2020	Surin City	9	(0)
Total		306	(86)

International career
2008–2013	Thailand	2	(0)
- * Club domestic league appearances and goals as of 14 November 2008

Phuwadol Suwannachart (Thai: ภูวดล สุวรรณชาติ, born June 20, 1982), is a Thai retired professional footballer who played as a striker.

== International career ==
In November 2013, he debuted for Thailand playing against Iran in the 2015 AFC Asian Cup qualification; he received a red card in the following game.

=== International ===
As of 12 November 2015

National team	Year	Apps	Goals
Thailand	2008	1	0
Thailand	2013	1	0
Thailand	Total	2	0

== Honours ==
=== Club ===
TOT S.C.

- Provincial League: 2006

=== Individual ===
- Thai Division 1 League top scorer: 2011
