= Apisorn Phumchat =

Thai footballer (born 1994)

Personal information
- Full name: Apisorn Phumchat
- Date of birth: 22 March 1994 (age 32)
- Place of birth: Bangkok, Thailand
- Height: 1.80 m (5 ft 11 in)
- Position: Attacking midfielder

Youth career
- 2012–2015: Bangkok Glass

Senior career*
Years	Team	Apps	(Gls)
2016–2017	BBCU		
2017	Chiangmai		
2017	→ Army United (loan)	11	(0)
2018	→ Chiangrai United (loan)	19	(1)
2019	Army United	32	(4)
2020–2021	Suphanburi	12	(1)
2021–2022	Khon Kaen United	18	(0)
2022–2025	Chiangrai United	16	(1)
- * Club domestic league appearances and goals as of 8 February 2025

Apisorn Phumchat (Thai: อภิศร ภูมิชาติ, born March 22, 1994) is a Thai professional footballer who plays as an attacking midfielder.
