= Suan Sunandha Rajabhat University Salaya Campus Stadium =

- Interactive map of Suan Sunandha Rajabhat University Salaya Campus Stadium
- Location: Nakhon Pathom, Thailand
- Coordinates: 13°52′05″N 100°16′13″E
- Owner: Suan Sunandha Rajabhat University
- Operator: Suan Sunandha Rajabhat University
- Surface: Grass

Suan Sunandha Rajabhat University Salaya Campus Stadium (Thai: สนาม มรภ.สวนสุนันทา ศาลายา) is a multi-purpose stadium in Nakhon Pathom Province, Thailand. The stadium holds 3,000 people.
