= Nawin Channgam =

Thai footballer (born 1983)

Personal information
- Full name: Nawin Channgam
- Date of birth: 9 December 1983 (age 42)
- Place of birth: Kanchanaburi, Thailand
- Height: 1.74 m (5 ft 8 1/2 in)
- Position: Attacking midfielder

Senior career*
Years	Team	Apps	(Gls)
2007–2010	TOT		
2011	Rajpracha		
2012–2013	Khon Kaen		
2014	BBCU		
2015	Ubon UMT United		
- * Club domestic league appearances and goals as of 14 January 2009 ‡ National team caps and goals as of 5 February 2009

Nawin Channgam (Thai นาวิน จันทร์งาม) is a Thai retired footballer.
