= São Geraldo da Piedade =

- Municipality
- Location in Brazil
- Coordinates: 18°50′9″S 42°17′16″W
- Country: Brazil
- Region: Southeast
- State: Minas Gerais
- Mesoregion: Vale do Rio Doce

Population (2022 Census)
  - Total: 3,305
  - Estimate (2025): 3,200
- Time zone: UTC−3 (BRT)

São Geraldo da Piedade is a municipality in the state of Minas Gerais in the Southeast region of Brazil.

== See also ==
- List of municipalities in Minas Gerais
