= 2008 Thailand League Division 1 =

Thailand Division 1 League
- Season: 2008
- Champions: Muang Thong United
- Promoted: Muang Thong United; Sriracha; Rajnavy Rayong
- Relegated: Thai Honda; Raj-Vithi; Nakorn Sawan; Phitsanulok
- Top goalscorer: (Thailand) Tanongsak Promdard (Raj-Vithi) (18)
- Biggest home win: Muang Thong United 6–1 Phitsanulok; PTT 6–1 Phitsanulok
- Biggest away win: Phitsanulok 0–3 Muang Thong United; Sriracha 0–3 Muang Thong United
- Highest scoring: Suphanburi 7–3 Phitsanulok (10 goals)

The 2008 Thailand League Division 1 has 16 teams.

== Rules ==
- Teams play each other twice on a home and away basis
- 3 Points for a win
- 1 Point for a draw
- Teams finishing on same points at the end of the season use head-to-head record to determine finishing position.
- The top three teams will be promoted to Thailand Premier League
- The top team as champions.
- The bottom four teams will be relegated to Thailand Division 2 League

== Member clubs ==
=== Stadiums and locations ===
Locations of the Thai Division 1 League 2008 teams
Football clubs in Bangkok Metropolitan Region

Club	Province	Home stadium	Capacity	
Chanthaburi	Chanthaburi	Chanthaburi Stadium		
Khonkaen	Khon Kaen	Khonkaen Stadium		
Muang Thong United	Nonthaburi	Mueang Thong Sport Stadium	5,000	Promoted from Thailand Division 2 League
Nakhon Sawan	Nakhon Sawan	Nakhon Sawan Stadium	15,000	
Phitsanulok	Phitsanulok	Pibulsongkram Rajabhat Stadium	3,000	
PTT	Bangkok	Jarun Burapharat Stadium Prachaniwet Sport Center	? ?	Promoted from Thailand Division 2 League
Raj Vithi	Bangkok	BEC Tero Sasana Nong Chok Stadium		
Rattana Bundit	Bangkok	Sai Rattana Bundit University Stadium		
Royal Thai Air Force	Pathum Thani	Thupatemee Stadium	20,000	
Royal Thai Navy	Chonburi	Sattahip Navy Stadium	10,000	Relegated from Thailand Premier League
Royal Thai Police	Bangkok	Boonyachinda Stadium	8,000	Relegated from Thailand Premier League
Sriracha-Sannibat	Chonburi	Assumption College Sriracha Stadium		
Suphanburi	Suphanburi	Suphan Buri Provincial Stadium		Relegated from Thailand Premier League
Surat Thani	Surat Thani	Surat Thani Stadium	10,000	
Thai Airways	Bang Kapi, Bangkok	Klong Chan Sports Center	?	
Thai Honda	Bangkok	72-years Anniversary Stadium	5,000	Relegated from Thailand Premier League

== Final league standings ==
Pos	Team	Pld	W	D	L	GF	GA	GD	Pts	Promotion or relegation
1	Muang Thong United (P)	30	19	8	3	58	17	+41	65	Champion and promotion spot for the Thailand Premier League
2	Sriracha	30	16	9	5	40	22	+18	57	Promotion spot for the Thailand Premier League
3	Rajnavy Rayong (R)	30	15	10	5	35	22	+13	55	Promotion spot for the Thailand Premier League
4	Royal Thai Police (R)	30	12	15	3	35	24	+11	51	
5	Chanthaburi	30	12	6	12	49	48	+1	42 (Note: Head to Head: PTT win 3-1)	
6	PTT (P)	30	10	11	9	38	29	+9	41	
7	Suphanburi (R)	30	11	8	11	48	47	+1	41	
8	Khonkaen	30	11	8	11	32	34	−2	41 (Note: Finish 8th on Head to Head)	
9	Rattana Bundit	30	10	10	10	46	48	−2	40 (Note: Head to Head: Rattana Bundit win 4-3)	
10	Royal Thai Air Force	30	10	10	10	40	32	+8	40	
11	Thai Airway	30	9	12	9	30	29	+1	39	
12	Surat Thani	30	10	7	13	36	38	−2	37	
13	Thai Honda (R)	30	9	7	14	29	38	−9	34	Relegation spots
14	Raj-Vithi	30	7	5	18	36	58	−22	26	Relegation spots
15	Nakorn Sawan	30	5	8	17	26	47	−21	23	Relegation spots
16	Phitsanulok	30	4	6	20	31	76	−45	18	Relegation spots

Rules for classification: 1st points; 2nd head-to-head; 3rd goal difference; 4th goals scored
(P) Promoted; (R) Relegated

== Results ==
Home \ Away	SUR	NAV	SRR	AIR	RVT	PTT	RTA	POL	HON	RTB	MTU	KHK	SPB	NAK	PHT	CHB
Surat Thani		2–0	0–1	2–3	2–0	0–2	1–0	0–0	1–0	3–1	0–1	1–0	1–2	1–2	3–0	4–0
Royal Thai Navy	0–0		2–2	0–0	2–0	1–0	2–1	0–0	0–1	1–1	1–0	2–1	0–0	3–1	4–1	1–0
Sriracha	2–0	2–0		1–0	2–0	1–0	0–0	2–0	2–0	0–0	0–3	1–0	2–0	0–0	4–2	1–2
Thai Airways	0–0	0–1	1–1		1–2	0–0	2–0	4–2	1–0	1–2	0–2	2–0	1–1	1–1	2–1	0–2
Raj-Vithi	1–2	0–2	1–3	2–0		1–1	0–2	0–1	0–1	1–2	1–2	1–2	4–2	1–0	3–1	2–3
PTT	0–0	0–0	0–2	2–2	4–5		0–1	0–1	0–0	3–1	0–1	2–1	2–0	2–0	6–1	2–2
Royal Thai Air Force	5–1	1–2	1–0	1–3	1–1	1–1		1–1	4–0	2–2	0–2	2–0	0–0	5–1	3–1	1–2
Royal Thai Police	2–2	1–0	0–0	0–0	2–1	1–0	2–0		1–1	2–2	0–0	1–1	3–3	2–1	2–0	1–0
Thai Honda	2–0	1–2	2–2	0–0	3–0	2–1	1–0	0–1		2–1	1–2	1–2	1–1	0–0	3–0	2–3
Rattana Bundit	1–2	2–2	2–2	2–1	2–2	0–1	2–1	3–2	3–0		1–1	2–2	1–0	1–0	3–2	0–1
Muang Thong United	2–0	2–0	0–1	1–1	4–0	0–1	1–1	1–1	2–1	3–1		3–0	2–0	4–0	6–1	5–2
Khonkaen FC	2–1	0–0	1–0	2–0	0–0	0–0	0–0	1–2	2–0	2–3	1–1		2–1	2–1	3–1	3–2
Suphanburi	3–2	1–3	1–0	0–2	6–3	1–1	1–1	0–0	5–2	3–2	0–2	1–0		1–0	7–3	3–2
Nakorn Sawan	1–0	1–2	2–3	0–1	1–1	2–3	1–1	0–0	0–1	0–0	2–2	2–0	0–2		1–2	4–3
Phitsanulok	3–3	1–1	1–1	0–0	1–3	0–2	1–2	0–3	1–1	2–1	0–3	1–1	2–1	0–1		2–0
Chanthaburi	2–2	0–1	1–2	1–1	3–0	2–2	1–2	1–1	1–0	4–2	0–0	0–1	3–2	3–1	3–0	

Legend: Blue = home team win; Yellow = draw; Red = away team win.

== Top scorers ==
Last updated October 6, 2008

Scorer	Goals	Team
(Thailand) Tanongsak Promdard	18	Raj-Vithi
(Ivory Coast) Moussa Sylla	17	Suphanburi
(Thailand) Witthaya Lhoareang	16	Chanthaburi
Victot Paintsil	12	Royal Thai Police
(Thailand) Rutthaporn Sae-tan	12	Chanthaburi
(Ivory Coast) Yaya Soumahoro	12	Muang Thong United
(Ivory Coast) Jacques Tioye	11	Muang Thong United
(Thailand) Issarapong Lilakorn	11	Khonkaen
Bayiha Naan David Martial	11	PTT
(Thailand) Mana Lakchum	10	Surat Thani
(Thailand) Watcharapong Channgam	9	Royal Thai Air Force
(Argentina) Gonzalez Gaston Raul	9	Sriracha

Witthaya Lhoareang

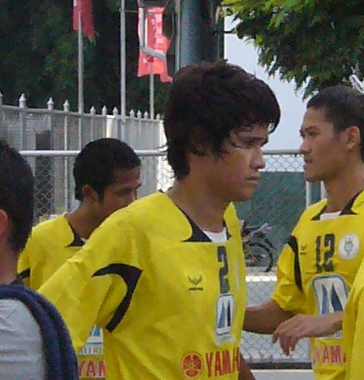
Rutthaporn Sae-tan

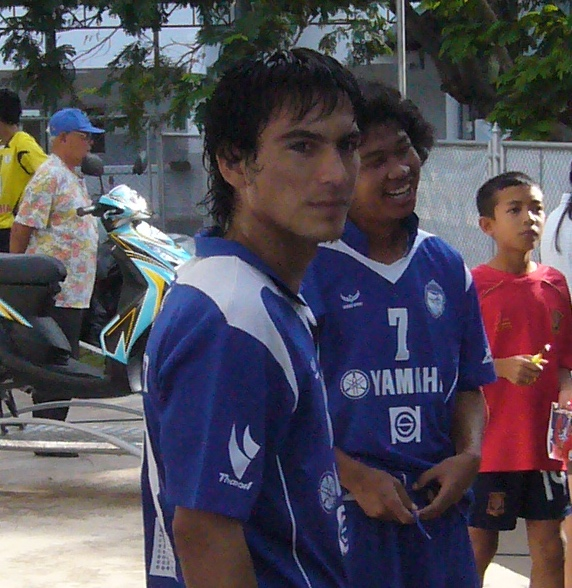
Gonzales Gaston Raul

== Prize money ==
- Champion : 700,000 Baht
- Runner-up : 300,000 Baht
- Third Place : 200,000 Baht
- Fourth Place : 100,000 Baht
- Fifth Place : 50,000 Baht
- Sixth Place : 40,000 Baht
- Seventh Place : 20,000 Baht

== See also ==
- 2008 Thailand Premier League
- 2008 Thailand League Division 2
