= PTT Rayong F.C. =

Thai football club

PTT Rayong พีทีที ระยอง
- Full name: PTT Rayong Football Club สโมสรฟุตบอล ปตท.ระยอง
- Nicknames: The Firepower (พลังเพลิง)
- Founded: 1998
- Dissolved: 2019
- Ground: PTT Stadium; Rayong, Thailand
- Capacity: 12,000
- Owner: PTT Group
Home colours	Away colours	Third colours

Petroleum Authority of Thailand Rayong Football Club, also referred to as simply PTT Rayong (Thai: สโมสรฟุตบอล ปตท.ระยอง), was a Thai defunct professional football club based in Rayong Province. They competed in Thai League 1 until 2019 after promotion as runner-up in 2007 from the Thailand Division 2 League. PTT FC is a company-sponsored sports club owned by the PTT Public Company Limited.

== History ==
PTT Public Company Limited had a football team founded in 1983 active in many competitions, both domestic and foreign. PTT Public Company Limited and Rayong Provincial Administrative Organization set up a football team to encourage the people of Rayong to see the benefits of football and improve the reputation of Rayong Province.

In 2012 the club built their own football stadium – PTT Stadium in Rayong, Thailand.

In 2019 PTT Public Company Limited decided to dissolve the team after talking with the executive board stated that the PTT group did not have enough expertise in running a professional football club. The club president, Chansilp Treinuchakorn, cited the low number of supporters as the reason for folding the club. Chansilp Treinuchakorn disclosed that the PTT Group aspired to develop a football club that truly represents the people residing in the Rayong province and one that deserves their support. From now on, the PTT group will focus on its youth football academy, hoping to assemble a side that fulfills the potential of local talents and wins the support of the local residents in the province.

== Crest history ==
PTT Rayong
to 2016

PTT Rayong
to 2019

== Stadium and locations ==
Coordinates	Location	Stadium	Capacity	Year
13°50′16″N 100°32′48″E	Bangkok	Prachaniwet Sport Centre	?	2007
13°45′01″N 100°34′02″E	Bangkok	Jarun Burapharat Stadium	?	2008
13°50′17″N 100°32′48″E	Bangkok	Prachaniwet Sport Center	?	2008
13°24′41″N 100°59′37″E	Chonburi	IPE Chonburi Stadium	12,000	2009
12°40′49″N 101°14′08″E	Rayong	Rayong Province Stadium	14,000	2010–2011
12°46′02″N 101°09′54″E	Rayong	PTT Stadium (Mabka Stadium)	12,161	2011–2019

== Season by season domestic record ==
Season	League									FA Cup	Queen's Cup	League Cup	ACL	Top scorer	
Season	Division	P	W	D	L	F	A	Pts	Pos	FA Cup	Queen's Cup	League Cup	ACL	Name	Goals
2007	DIV 2	22	14	4	4	41	16	46	2nd	–	–	–	–	—N/a	—N/a
2008	DIV 1	30	10	11	9	38	29	41	6th	–	–	–	–	David Bayiha	11
2009	DIV 1	30	9	9	12	53	49	36	10th	R3	–	–	–	Jirawoot Saranant	18
2010	DIV 1	30	9	11	10	47	51	38	11th	R2	–	R3	–	Rachanon Srinork	10
2011	DIV 1	34	17	8	9	54	28	59	4th	R3	–	R1	–	Adisak Srikampang	21
2012	DIV 1	34	19	5	10	61	33	62	5th	R4	–	R1	–	Adisak Srikampang	11
2013	DIV 1	34	17	13	4	44	27	64	3rd	QF	–	R3	–	Pipat Thonkanya	9
2014	TPL	38	10	12	16	49	60	42	17th	R4	–	QF	–	Amadou Ouattara	11
2015	DIV 1	38	14	12	12	62	60	54	7th	R2	–	R1	–	Yves Desmarets	12
2016	DIV 1	26	10	5	11	42	43	35	8th	R1	–	R2	–	Leandro	5
2017	T2	32	14	8	10	54	50	50	5th	QF	–	R2	–	Dennis Murillo	18
2018	T2	28	17	5	6	54	32	56	1st	R2	–	Qualification play-off	–	Dennis Murillo	14
2019	T1	30	9	8	13	33	46	35	11th	R2	–	Round 32	–	Ariel Rodríguez	9

Champions	Runners-up	Third place	Promoted	Relegated

- P = Played
- W = Games won
- D = Games drawn
- L = Games lost
- F = Goals for
- A = Goals against
- Pts = Points
- Pos = Final position
- N/A = No answer
- TPL = Thai Premier League
- QR1 = First Qualifying Round
- QR2 = Second Qualifying Round
- QR3 = Third Qualifying Round
- QR4 = Fourth Qualifying Round
- RInt = Intermediate Round
- R1 = Round 1
- R2 = Round 2
- R3 = Round 3
- R4 = Round 4
- R5 = Round 5
- R6 = Round 6
- GR = Group stage
- QF = Quarter-finals
- SF = Semi-finals
- RU = Runners-up
- S = Shared
- W = Winners

== Achievements ==
=== Domestic competitions ===
- Thai League 2
  - Winner: 2018
- Thailand Division 2 League
  - Runner-up (1): 2007

== See also ==
- PTT Public Company Limited
