= Worawet Chanuthai =

Thai footballer (born 1983)

Personal information
- Full name: Worawet Chanuthai
- Date of birth: 20 August 1983 (age 43)
- Place of birth: Songkhla, Thailand
- Height: 1.72 m (5 ft 7 1/2 in)
- Position: Striker

Team information
- Current team: Samut Songkhram
- Number: 15

Senior career*
Years	Team	Apps	(Gls)
2004–2007	Bangkok Bank	37	(6)
2008	PEA	17	(2)
2009–2010	Thai Port	25	(3)
2010	Songkhla	48	(26)
?–2012	Suphan Buri		
2013	Bangkok F.C.		
2014	Samut Songkhram		
2015	Lampang		
2016	Satun		
- * Club domestic league appearances and goals as of 11 October 2008

Worawet Chanuthai (Thai: วรเวศ จันทร์อุทัย) or formerly Nantawet Chanuthai (Thai: นันทเวศ จันทร์อุทัย) is a Thai footballer. He played for various teams in Thailand Premier League including Bangkok Bank FC, Provincial Electricity Authority FC (PEA), Thai Port FC and Samut Songkhram F.C. He won the Thailand Premier League in 2008 playing for PEA.

His other teams include Songkhla F.C., Suphanburi F.C., Lampang F.C., Satun United F.C.

He is currently retired from football and works at Songkhla Zoo.

== Honours ==
- Thailand Premier League 2008
