= Chainarong Tathong =

Thai footballer

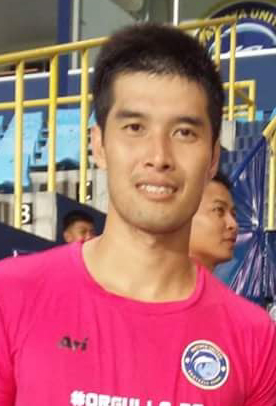

Personal information
- Full name: Chainarong Tathong
- Date of birth: 31 January 1987 (age 39)
- Place of birth: Sisaket, Thailand
- Height: 1.80 m (5 ft 11 in)
- Positions: Striker; winger

Youth career
- 2007–2008: BBCU

Senior career*
Years	Team	Apps	(Gls)
2009–2012	BBCU	78	(23)
2012–2016	Muangthong United	8	(2)
2013–2014	→ Army United (loan)	26	(9)
2015	→ Osotspa Samut Prakan (loan)	24	(3)
2016	→ BEC Tero Sasana (loan)	4	(1)
2016	→ PTT Rayong (loan)	10	(7)
2017–2018	Pattaya United	18	(3)
2018	→ PTT Rayong (loan)	21	(7)
2019	Simork	3	(1)
2019	Navy	10	(2)
Total		202	(58)

International career
2014	Thailand	3	(0)
Medal record
Thailand
Asean Football Championship
Winner	AFF Suzuki Cup 2014	2014
- * Club domestic league appearances and goals

Chainarong Tathong (Thai: ชัยณรงค์ ทาทอง, born 31 January 1987), simply known as Bie (Thai: บี้) is a Thai retired professional footballer who plays as a striker.

== Club career ==
At BBCU, Chainarong was the 2010 Thai Division 1 League top scorer with 19 goals. Muangthong United bought him from BBCU in 2012. In 2013, he was loaned to Army United. In the second leg of the 2013 Thai Premier League, Chainarong came back to Muangthong after impressive form with Army United. He scored his first Muangthong United goal against Samut Songkhram.

Later in the season, Chainarong scored his second goal for Muangthong against Suphanburi, marking his first goal at SCG Stadium. In recent seasons, he has again gone out on loan from Muangthong, spending 2015 with Osotspa Samut Prakan. He started 2016 on loan with BEC Tero Sasana, and is currently at PTT Rayong.

== International career ==
Chainarong was called up to the national team for the 2015 AFC Asian Cup qualification against Kuwait and Iran, but didn't get a chance to play. Chainarong was also part of Thailand's squad in the 2014 AFF Suzuki Cup.

=== International ===
Appearances and goals by national team and year
National team	Year	Apps	Goals
Thailand	2014	3	0
Thailand	Total	3	0

== Personal life ==
Chainarong's brother, Wuttichai Tathong, is also a footballer as a striker.

== Honours ==
=== International ===
Thailand

- ASEAN Football Championship (1): 2014

=== Individual ===
- Thai Division 1 League Top Scorer (1): 2010
