= Chainat Hornbill F.C. =

Thai professional association football club

Chainat Hornbill ชัยนาท ฮอร์นบิล
- Full name: Chainat Hornbill Football Club สโมสรฟุตบอลชัยนาท ฮอร์นบิล
- Nicknames: The Hornbills (นกใหญ่พิฆาต)
- Short name: CNHB
- Founded: 2009; 17 years ago
- Ground: Khao Plong Stadium; Chai Nat, Thailand
- Capacity: 9,000
- Chairman: Anucha Nakasai
- Head Coach: Laksana Kamruen
- League: Thai League 2
- 2025–26: Thai League 2, 6th of 18
- Website: chainathornbill.com
Home colours	Away colours	Third colours

Chainat Hornbill Football Club (Thai สโมสรฟุตบอลชัยนาท ฮอร์นบิล) is a Thai professional association football club based in Chai Nat province. The club plays in Thai League 2.

The club has won 1 Thai League 2 title and 1 Thai FA Cup in their history.

== History ==
=== Foundation ===
Chainat Hornbill Football Club is a professional football club founded in 2009 by Anucha Nakasai, a former Thai politician. The club was placed in the best management class as a result, and it has developed rapidly since its first season. In the 2009 Northern Regional Division 2 Regional League the club came third, playing 20 matches and winning 12, drawing 3 and losing 5 for a total of 39 points. Their top scorer was Sanogo Abou, with 15 goals. In 2012, the club was promoted to the top league, Thai League 1, for the first time.

=== Dennis Amato era ===
In 2016, club chairman, Anucha Nakasai announced the appointment of Dennis Amato as the new head coach of the club. In October 2017, the club came first winning the 2017 Thai League 2 with 67 points and was promoted to the 2018 Thai League 1.

After Chainat Hornbill's promotion to the top tier of Thai football, Amato briefly left the club to take up a role as a director of football at Ang Thong. The club announced the appointment of Drago Mamić as the new head coach of the club but Mamić left the club for personal reasons. However, Amato returned to Chainat again, but was faced with many problems, including a squad with a limited number of players, and strict financial constraints.

==== A Thai League Survival Campaign: Giant-killing ====
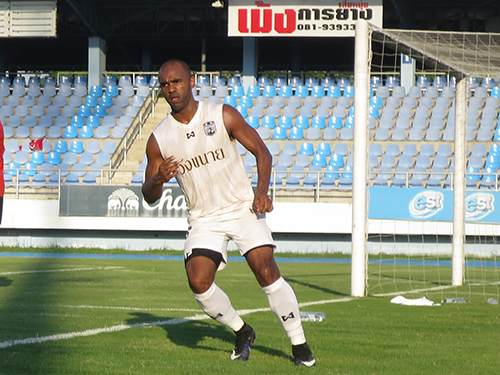
Florent Sinama Pongolle is the club's all-time top scorer (33)

In 2018, after a win against defending FA Cup champions Chiangrai United, the Hornbills defeated the defending Thai League 1 champions Buriram United 1–0 at the Chang Arena, which was the first time that Buriram United had failed to win a league game on their own home ground since the return of Bozidar Bandovic as coach. In the 2018 season, the club became well known as "giant-killing." (Thai: จอมล้มยักษ์). Under Amato's management, the Hornbills play a style of football based on maintaining possession, and trying to win the ball back after losing it, instead of regrouping into a defensive position.

In 2019, the Hornbills beat many Thai League 1 giants. In a home game at Khao Plong Stadium they beat Muangthong United 3–0, won against Bangkok United with a score of 2-1, and beat Buriram United 2–1.

== Stadium and locations by season ==
Coordinates	Location	Stadium	Capacity	Year
15°13′08″N 100°09′20″E	Chai Nat	Khao Plong Stadium	12,000	2009–present

== Season by season record ==
Season	League									FA Cup	League Cup	Top scorer	
Season	Division	P	W	D	L	F	A	Pts	Pos	FA Cup	League Cup	Name	Goals
2009	Div. 2 North	20	12	3	5	52	32	39	3rd	QR1	–	—N/a	—N/a
2010	Div. 2 North	30	22	5	3	54	13	71	2nd	Opted out	Opted out	—N/a	—N/a
2011	Div. 1	34	21	3	10	68	42	66	2nd	QF	R1	Phuwadol Suwannachart	21
2012	TPL	34	9	12	13	59	72	39	14th	R4	R1	Phuwadol Suwannachart	13
2013	TPL	32	10	8	14	42	43	38	10th	R3	R2	Sumanya Purisai	11
2014	TPL	38	10	14	14	43	50	44	14th	R3	QF	Nikola Nikezić; Park Jung-Soo; Sumanya Purisai	4
2015	TPL	34	9	10	15	42	53	37	12th	SF	R1	Alex	17
2016	TL	31	8	6	17	46	61	30	17th	W	R1	Florent Pongolle	13
2017	T2	32	20	7	5	64	40	67	1st	R1	R1	Florent Pongolle	14
2018	T1	34	11	9	14	46	52	42	13th	R1	R1	Bernard Doumbia	15
2019	T1	30	8	6	16	31	50	30	15th	R2	R2	Ricardo Santos	10
2020–21	T2	34	16	9	9	61	47	57	6th	R1	—	Warayut Klomnak	9
2021–22	T2	34	15	12	7	58	46	57	5th	R1	R2	Badar Ali	10
2022–23	T2	34	11	8	15	44	48	41	13th	R2	QPR	Diego Silva	14
2023–24	T2	34	9	10	15	32	46	37	14th	Opted out	Opted out	Thanayut Jittabud	9
2024–25	T2	32	8	11	13	32	34	35	14th	QR	R2	Thanayut Jittabud	13
2025–26	T2	34	12	10	12	50	46	46	6th	QR	R1	Amarildo	15
2026–27	T2									QR			

Champions	Runners-up	Third place	Promoted	Relegated

- P = Played
- W = Games won
- D = Games drawn
- L = Games lost
- F = Goals for
- A = Goals against
- Pts = Points
- Pos = Final position
- N/A = No answer
- TL = Thai League 1
- QR1 = First Qualifying Round
- QR2 = Second Qualifying Round
- QR3 = Third Qualifying Round
- QR4 = Fourth Qualifying Round
- RInt = Intermediate Round
- R1 = Round 1
- R2 = Round 2
- R3 = Round 3
- R4 = Round 4
- R5 = Round 5
- R6 = Round 6
- GR = Group stage
- QF = Quarter-finals
- SF = Semi-finals
- RU = Runners-up
- S = Shared
- W = Winners

== Players ==
=== First team squad ===
As of September 2026

Note: Flags indicate national team as defined under FIFA eligibility rules; some limited exceptions apply. Players may hold more than one non-FIFA nationality.

No.	Pos.	Nation	Player
2	DF	THA	Naphat Jaruphatphakdee
4	DF	THA	Tanin Kiatlerttham
6	DF	THA	Rachata Somporn
7	MF	THA	Mongkonchai Kongjumpa (Captain)
8	MF	THA	Anuwat Matarat
10	FW	USA	Elijah Douglas
11	MF	THA	Thanachot Sornsri
13	DF	THA	Warakorn Thongbai
14	MF	THA	Sirayos Dansakul
15	DF	THA	Phongraria Aimmongkol
17	FW	THA	Kandith Kaewchotchuangkool
18	MF	THA	Piyaruck Kwangkaew
19	FW	NGR	Mubarak Mohammed Ahmed
20	MF	THA	Anuwat Maharat
21	FW	THA	Tanasorn Chantharakhot

No.	Pos.	Nation	Player
24	MF	THA	Piyarot Kwangkaew
25	GK	THA	Phongsapat Sukkasem
27	DF	THA	Bazil Samakkij
29	FW	THA	Thitiwat Phranmaen (on loan from Sukhothai)
36	GK	THA	Kontee Sitthilersjanya
45	FW	THA	Pongpranod Kaewwichien
51	MF	THA	Phanupong Popsayai
55	DF	THA	Paphontee Sertsri
60	DF	THA	Wisarut Poomsrikaew
73	MF	THA	Akkharaphol Mongkhonsakhon
79	MF	THA	Nawinmet Cheawchan
89	FW	IND	Aryan Bose
90	FW	THA	Piyaphong Phrueksupee
95	GK	THA	Siraset Aekprathumchai
99	DF	FRA	Ousmane Badji

==== Out on loan ====
Note: Flags indicate national team as defined under FIFA eligibility rules; some limited exceptions apply. Players may hold more than one non-FIFA nationality.

No.	Pos.	Nation	Player
22	MF	THA	Surabadee Ratjarean (at (Thailand) Sakaeo)

== Coaches ==
Coaches by Years (2010–present)

- (Thailand) Issara Sritaro 2010–2012
- (Thailand) Surachai Jaturapattarapong 2012–2014
- (Thailand) Jadet Meelarp 2014
- (Thailand) Thawatchai Damrong-Ongtrakul 2014–2015
- (Thailand) Issara Sritaro 2015–2016
- (Japan) Koichi Sugiyama 2016
- (Germany) Dr. med. Björn Kliem 2016–2017
- (Germany) Dennis Amato 2017
- (Croatia) Drago Mamić 2017–2018
- (Germany) Dennis Amato 2018–2019
- (Germany) Ronald Boretti 2020–2021
- (Thailand) Sumeth Yooto 2021–2022
- (Argentina) Daniel Blanco 2022
- (Thailand) Sumeth Yooto 2022
- (Thailand) Pannarai Phansiri 2022–2023
- (Thailand) Sumeth Yooto 2023–2024
- (Thailand) Sarach Paungchup 2024–2025
- (Thailand) Laksana Kamruen 2025–

== Honours ==
=== Domestic competitions ===
==== League ====
- Thai League 2:
  - Winner: 2017
  - Runner-up: 2011
- Regional League Northern Division:
  - Runner-up (1): 2010

==== Cups ====
- Thai FA Cup
  - Champions: 2016
