= Wuttichai Tathong =

Thai footballer

Personal information
- Full name: Wuttichai Tathong
- Date of birth: 11 April 1985 (age 41)
- Place of birth: Sisaket, Thailand
- Height: 1.72 m (5 ft 7 1/2 in)
- Position: Striker

Youth career
- 2004–2006: Chula United

Senior career*
Years	Team	Apps	(Gls)
2006–2008	Chula United	46	(23)
2009–2010	BEC Tero Sasana	36	(15)
2010	→ Sisaket (loan)	16	(11)
2011–2012	Esan United	9	(5)
2013	Suphanburi	26	(9)
2014–2015	Muangthong United	37	(7)
2015–2017	Port	28	(4)
2018	Ubon UMT United	10	(1)
2018	Udon Thani	13	(1)
2019	Simork	6	(0)
2019	Navy	6	(1)
Total		233	(77)

International career
2007	Thailand U23	5	(2)
- * Club domestic league appearances and goals as of September 5, 2019

Wuttichai Tathong (Thai: วุฒิชัย ทาทอง; born April 11, 1985) is a Thai retired professional footballer who played as a striker.

== Honours ==
=== International ===
Thailand U-23

- Sea Games Gold Medal (1); 2007

== International career ==
Wuttichai won the 2007 Southeast Asian Games with Thailand national under-23 football team. In 2014, he was called up to the national team by Kiatisuk Senamuang to play in the 2015 AFC Asian Cup qualification, but did not make an appearance.

== Personal life ==
Wuttichai's brother Chainarong Tathong is also a footballer.

== Individual ==
- Thai League 1 Player of the Month (1): June 2013
- ASEAN All-Stars: 2014
