= 2010 BEC Tero Sasana F.C. season =

BEC Tero Sasana
2010 season
- Chairman: Brian Marcar
- Manager: Tawan Sripan
- Thai Premier League: 9th
- FA Cup: Fourth round
- Queen's Cup: Quarter-final
- League Cup: Second round
Home colours	Away colours

The 2010 season was BEC's 14th season in the top division of Thai football. This article shows statistics of the club's players in the season, and also lists all matches that the club played in the season.

== Chronological list of events ==
- 10 November 2009: The Thai Premier League 2010 season first leg fixtures were announced.
- January 2010: BEC announced that they will build an extra stand at the stadium in Nong Jork. The new stand will sit opposite the existing stand and will hold 2000 fans. It is expected to be completed in April
- January 2010: BEC announce that they will use the Thephasadin Stadium whilst the Nong Jork ground is expanded.
- 11 August 2010: BEC Tero Sasana were knocked out of the Thai FA Cup by Nakhon Pathom in the fourth round.
- 15 September 2010: BEC Tero Sasana were knocked out of the Thai League Cup by Sriracha in the second round due to away goals.
- 24 October 2010: BEC Tero Sasana finished in 9th place in the Thai Premier League.

== Squad ==
Note: Flags indicate national team as defined under FIFA eligibility rules; some limited exceptions apply. Players may hold more than one non-FIFA nationality.

No.	Pos.	Nation	Player
1	GK	THA	Pisan Dorkmaikaew
2	DF	THA	Noppol Pitafai
3	DF	THA	Thritthi Nonsrichai (captain)
4	FW	THA	Ekkachai Nuikao
5	DF	THA	Prat Samakrat
6	MF	THA	Chalakorn Sa-nguandee
7	MF	THA	Kittipol Paphunga
8	FW	THA	Wuttichai Tathong
9	FW	THA	Prompong Kansumrong
10	MF	CIV	Akassou Jean Bamptiste
11	FW	THA	Chakrit Buathong
13	FW	THA	Narej Karpkraikaew
15	MF	THA	Paisarn Sang-aroon
16	DF	THA	Narat Munin-noppamart

No.	Pos.	Nation	Player
17	FW	THA	Anon Sangsanoi
18	GK	THA	Intharat Apinyakool
19	FW	THA	Panai Kongpraphan
21	MF	THA	Hatthaporn Suwan
22	MF	THA	Kittipoom Paphunga
23	DF	THA	Tassana Cheamsa-art
24	FW	THA	Anon Budpa
25	DF	MAD	Guy Hubert
27	MF	THA	Kittitat Prajantasri
28	MF	THA	Pichit Jaiboon
29	FW	THA	Tuanglarb Kohthong
30	DF	BRA	Douglas Cobo
33	MF	BRA	Mario Caetano Neto
36	GK	THA	Worawut Kaewpook

=== Transfers ===
In

Note: Flags indicate national team as defined under FIFA eligibility rules; some limited exceptions apply. Players may hold more than one non-FIFA nationality.

No.	Pos.	Nation	Player
9	FW	THA	Prompong Kansumrong (Transferred from Nakhon Ratchasima FC)
36	GK	THA	Worawut Kaewmuk (Transferred from -)
21	MF	THA	Hatthaporn Suwan (Transferred from Muang Thong United FC)
22	MF	THA	Kittipoom Paphunga (Transferred from Chula United)
24	FW	THA	Anon Budpa (Transferred from Nakhon Sawan FC)
30	DF	BRA	Douglas Felipe Moreira Cobo (Transferred from Sriracha F.C.)
33	MF	BRA	Mario Caetano Neto (Transferred from Chula United)
--	FW	THA	Ekkachai Nuikao (Transferred from Ayutthaya FC)

Out

Note: Flags indicate national team as defined under FIFA eligibility rules; some limited exceptions apply. Players may hold more than one non-FIFA nationality.

No.	Pos.	Nation	Player
1	GK	THA	Sivaruck Tedsungnoen (Transferred to Buriram PEA)
4	MF	THA	Jakkraphan Kaewprom (Transferred to Muang Thong United)
9	FW	THA	Phuwadol Sankla (Transferred to TOT FC)

== Results ==
=== Thai Premier League ===
4 April 2010	Buriram PEA	1 - 1	BEC Tero Sasana	i-mobile Stadium, Buriram
				Referee: Sakda Pansut

10 April 2010	BEC Tero Sasana	3 - 1	Osotspa Saraburi	Thephasadin Stadium, Bangkok
				Referee: Prathan Nasawang

17 April 2010	Police United	1 - 2	BEC Tero Sasana	Bangkok
				Stadium: Thammasat Rangsit Stadium; Referee: Atthakorn Wetchakan

2 May 2010	Rajnavy Rayong	3 - 1	BEC Tero Sasana	Rayong
				Stadium: Rayong Stadium; Referee: Sura Sriart

23 May 2010	Muangthong United	2 - 0	BEC Tero Sasana	Nonthaburi
				Stadium: Yamaha Stadium; Referee: Prapod Didsomsri

28 May 2010	Bangkok United	1 – 1	BEC Tero Sasana	Bangkok
				Stadium: Thai-Japanese Stadium; Referee: Prathan Nasawang

5 June 2010	BEC Tero Sasana	2 – 1	Samut Songkhram	Bangkok
				Stadium: Thephasadin Stadium

12 June 2010	TOT-CAT	0 – 5	BEC Tero Sasana	Nonthaburi
				Stadium: Yamaha Stadium; Referee: Preecha Kangram

16 June 2010	BEC Tero Sasana	0 – 1	Bangkok Glass	Bangkok
				Stadium: Thephasadin Stadium; Referee: Sakda Pansut

20 June 2010	Sisaket	1 – 0	BEC Tero Sasana	Sisaket
				Stadium: Sri Nakhon Lamduan Stadium; Referee: Porached Wongkamdee

27 June 2010	BEC Tero Sasana	2 – 3	Pattaya United	Bangkok
				Stadium: Thephasadin Stadium

30 June 2010	Thai Port	1 – 0	BEC Tero Sasana	Bangkok
				Stadium: PAT Stadium; Referee: Chaiya Mahaprab

4 July 2010	BEC Tero Sasana	2 – 2	TTM Phichit	Bangkok
				Stadium: Thephasadin Stadium; Referee: Preecha Kangram

10 July 2010	Royal Thai Army	1 – 1	BEC Tero Sasana	Bangkok
				Stadium: Thai Army Sports Stadium; Referee: Apisit Aonrak

14 July 2010	BEC Tero Sasana	1 – 4	Chonburi	Bangkok
				Stadium: Thephasadin Stadium; Referee: Chaiya Mahaprab

18 July 2010	BEC Tero Sasana	3 – 0	Bangkok United	Bangkok
				Stadium: Thephasadin Stadium; Referee: Thanom Burikut

24 July 2010	Bangkok Glass	2 – 2	BEC Tero Sasana	Pathumthani
				Stadium: Leo Stadium; Referee: Preecha Kangram

28 July 2010	BEC Tero Sasana	1 – 4	Buriram PEA	Bangkok
				Stadium: Thephasadin Stadium; Referee: Porached Wongkamdee

8 August 2010	Osotspa Saraburi	0 – 0	BEC Tero Sasana	Saraburi
				Stadium: Saraburi Stadium; Referee: Mongkolchai Pradsri

14 August 2010	BEC Tero Sasana	2 – 0	Police United	Bangkok
				Stadium: Thephasadin Stadium

18 August 2010	Chonburi	2 – 0	BEC Tero Sasana	Chonburi
				Stadium: IPE Chonburi Stadium; Referee: Preecha Kangram

25 August 2010	BEC Tero Sasana	0 – 0	Rajnavy Rayong	Bangkok
				Stadium: Thephasadin Stadium; Referee: Chaiya Mahaprab

12 September 2010	BEC Tero Sasana	2 - 1	Royal Thai Army	Bangkok
18.00 UTC+7				Stadium: Thephasadin Stadium; Referee: Chanyut Pongpanomwet

25 September 2010	Samut Songkhram	1 - 0	BEC Tero Sasana	Samut Songkhram
16.30 UTC+7				Stadium: Samut Songkhram Stadium; Referee: Prapod Didsomsri

29 September 2010	BEC Tero Sasana	1 - 0	TOT-CAT	Bangkok
18.00 UTC+7				Stadium: Thephasadin Stadium

2 October 2010	BEC Tero Sasana	2 - 3	Sisaket	Bangkok
				Stadium: Thephasadin Stadium

11 October 2010	BEC Tero Sasana	0 - 1	Muangthong United	Bangkok
				Stadium: Thephasadin Stadium; Referee: Mongkolchai Pradsri

14 October 2010	BEC Tero Sasana	4 - 2	Thai Port	Bangkok
				Stadium: Thephasadin Stadium; Referee: Porached Wongkamdee

17 October 2010	Pattaya United	3 - 1	BEC Tero Sasana	Pattaya
				Stadium: Nongprue Municipality Football Field

==== League table ====
Pos	Team	Pld	W	D	L	GF	GA	GD	Pts
7	Osotspa M-150 Saraburi	30	10	12	8	32	30	+2	42
8	Samut Songkhram	30	11	9	10	27	32	−5	42
9	BEC Tero Sasana	30	9	8	13	39	42	−3	35
10	Rajnavy Rayong	30	8	9	13	35	52	−17	33
11	Police United	30	9	6	15	40	45	−5	33

Updated to match(es) played on 24 October 2010. Source: FIFA.com
Rules for classification: 1st points; 2nd head-to-head; 3rd match win; 4th goal difference; 5th number of goals scored

=== FA Cup ===
==== Third round ====
1 August 2010	Chiangrai United	1 – 1 (1 - 2 a.e.t)	BEC Tero Sasana	Chiangrai
				Stadium: Chiangrai Stadium

==== Fourth round ====
11 August 2010	BEC Tero Sasana	2 – 3	Nakhon Pathom	Bangkok
				Stadium: Thephasadin Stadium

=== League Cup ===
==== First round ====
===== 1st leg =====
29 August 2010	Rayong	0 - 1	BEC Tero Sasana	Rayong
				Stadium: Rayong Stadium

===== 2nd leg =====
1 September 2010	BEC Tero Sasana	3 - 1	Rayong	Bangkok
				Stadium: Thephasadin Stadium

==== Second round ====
===== 1st leg =====
8 September 2010	Sriracha	0 - 0	BEC Tero Sasana	Sriracha
				Stadium: Princess Sirindhorn Stadium

===== 2nd leg =====
15 September 2010	BEC Tero Sasana	3 - 3	Sriracha	Bangkok
				Stadium: Thephasadin Stadium

=== Queen's Cup ===
6 February 2010	BEC Tero Sasana	4 – 0	Raj Pracha-Nonthaburi	Chonburi
16:00 UTC+7	Anon 52'; Narej 60'; Hubert 76' (pen.); Noppol 87'			Stadium: Nongprue Municipality Stadium

8 February 2010	Air Force United	1 – 2	BEC Tero Sasana	Chonburi
16:00 UTC+7	Prasart 75'		Anon 45'; Prompong 70'	Stadium: Nongprue Municipality Stadium

10 February 2010	BEC Tero Sasana	3 – 2	Pattaya United	Chonburi
18:30 UTC+7	Christian 35'; Narej 60'; Anon B. 83'		Ludovick 72', 89'	Stadium: Nongprue Municipality Stadium

13 February 2010	BEC Tero Sasana	0 – 1	Police United	Nongprue Municipality Stadium, Chonburi
18:00 UTC+7		Report	Assaming 61'
