= 2010 TTM Phichit F.C. season =

TTM Phichit
2010 season
- Chairman: Surajit Kalayanamitr
- Manager: Prajuk Viengsong
- Thai Premier League: 13th
- FA Cup: Fourth Round
- League Cup: Second Round
| Home colours | Away colours |

The 2010 season was TTM's tenth season in the top division of Thai football. This article shows statistics of the club's players in the season, and also lists all matches that the club played in the season.

== Chronological list of events ==
- 10 November 2009: The Thai Premier League 2010 season first leg fixtures were announced.
- 5 September 2010: TTM Phichit were knocked out of the Thai FA Cup by Sisaket in the fourth round.
- 6 October 2010: TTM Phichit were knocked out of the Thai League Cup by Buriram PEA in the second round.
- 24 October 2010: TTM Phichit finished in 13th place in the Thai Premier League.

== Squad ==
As of 3 February 2010 Note: Flags indicate national team as defined under FIFA eligibility rules; some limited exceptions apply. Players may hold more than one non-FIFA nationality.

| No. | Pos. | Nation | Player |
|---|---|---|---|
| 2 | DF | THA | Pradit Taweechai |
| 4 | DF | THA | Tana Sripandorn |
| 5 | DF | CMR | Franck Adams |
| 6 | DF | JPN | Hiroyuki Yamamoto (captain) |
| 7 | DF | THA | Peeratat Phoruendee |
| 8 | MF | THA | Narong Jansawek |
| 11 | MF | THA | Santipap Siri |
| 13 | FW | THA | Supphakorn Ramkulabsuk |
| 14 | FW | THA | Kraikitti In-Utane |
| 15 | MF | THA | Jetsada Boonruangrod |
| 16 | MF | THA | Somchai Han-Iang |
| 17 | MF | BOL | Roland Vargas-Aguilera |
| 18 | GK | THA | Suchin Yen-arrom |
| 20 | FW | THA | Kwanchai Fuangprakob |
| 21 | FW | THA | Kittipong Moonpong |

| No. | Pos. | Nation | Player |
|---|---|---|---|
| 22 | MF | THA | Chatprapob Usaprom |
| 23 | MF | THA | Sakda Chutipakpong |
| 25 | MF | THA | Salahudin Arware |
| 26 | MF | THA | Kobdech Chobmanotham |
| 27 | MF | THA | Watchara Mahawong |
| 30 | FW | BRA | Valci Júnior |
| 31 | MF | BRA | Diego |
| 32 | DF | CIV | Leon N'Guatta |
| 33 | MF | THA | Nitipong Saiyasit |
| 34 | GK | THA | Todsaporn Sri-reung |
| 35 | FW | THA | Sakron Pinped |
| 36 | FW | THA | Kraisorn Sriyan |
| 37 | DF | THA | Niphol Panprom |
| 38 | GK | THA | Samuel P.Cunningham |

=== 2010 season transfers ===
In

Note: Flags indicate national team as defined under FIFA eligibility rules; some limited exceptions apply. Players may hold more than one non-FIFA nationality.

| No. | Pos. | Nation | Player |
|---|---|---|---|
| — | DF | JPN | Hiroyuki Yamamoto (from Sengkang Punggol) |
| — | FW | CIV | Kone Adama (loan from Muang Thong United) |
| — | MF | CIV | Brou Clement (loan from Muang Thong United) |
| — | FW | THA | Anusorn Srichaluang (loan from Muang Thong United) |
| — | MF | THA | Songwut Buapetch (from Samut Songkhram) |
| — | MF | THA | Santipap Siri (from Samut Songkhram) |
| — | MF | THA | Somjets Kesarat (from Thai Port FC) |
| — | GK | THA | Suchin Yen-arrom (from Bangkok Christian College) |
| — | FW | THA | Kittipong Moonpong (from TOT FC) |
| — | GK | THA | Todsaporn Sri-reung (from Samut Songkhram) |
| — | DF | THA | Adulchai Sansook (from Chula United) |
| — | GK | THA | Adisak Duangsri (from Chula United) |
| — | MF | THA | Nitipong Saiyasit (from Customs Department Phetchaburi F.C.) |

Out

Note: Flags indicate national team as defined under FIFA eligibility rules; some limited exceptions apply. Players may hold more than one non-FIFA nationality.

| No. | Pos. | Nation | Player |
|---|---|---|---|
| — | GK | THA | Mantehwa Lahmsombat (to Osotsapa Saraburi FC) |
| — | DF | THA | Panuwat Failai (to Bangkok Glass FC) |
| — | GK | THA | Kritsakorn Kerdpol (to Bangkok Glass FC) |
| — | MF | CIV | Camara Aly (to Samut Sakhon FC) |
| — | MF | THA | Chatprapob Usaprom (to Buriram PEA) |
| — | FW | THA | Anucha Chaiyawong (to Chiangmai FC) |
| — | DF | THA | Jakkapong Yaito (to Chanthaburi FC) |
| — | FW | THA | Tanongsak Promdard (to TOT FC) |
| — | GK | THA | Narong Wisetsri (to Thai Port FC) |
| — | FW | CMR | Bekombo Ekollo (to Bangkok Glass FC) |
| — | MF | THA | Anucha Chuaysri (to Chiangrai United) |
| — | MF | THA | Naruecha Yantrasri (to TOT FC) |

== Results ==
=== Thai Premier League ===
| 20 March 2010 | Rajnavy Rayong | 1–2 | TTM Phichit | Rayong |
| | | | | Stadium: Rayong Stadium; Referee: Atthakorn Wetchakan |

| 27 March 2010 | TTM Phichit | 0–1 | TOT-CAT | Phichit |
| | | | | Stadium: Phichit Stadium; Referee: Wirote On-koke |

| 4 April 2010 | TTM Phichit | 3–1 | Royal Thai Army | Phichit |
| | | | | Stadium: Phichit Stadium; Referee: Sura Sriart |

| 10 April 2010 | Chonburi | 5–1 | TTM Phichit | Chonburi |
| | | | | Stadium: IPE Chonburi Stadium; Referee: Prapoj Dissomsri |

| 18 April 2010 | TTM Phichit | 3–0 | Pattaya United | Phichit |
| | | | | Stadium: Phichit Stadium; Referee: Chaiya Mahapab |

| 25 April 2010 | Osotspa Saraburi | 1–1 | TTM Phichit | M-150 Saraburi Stadium, Saraburi |
| | | | | Referee: Porached Wongkamdee |

| 1 May 2010 | Bangkok United | 0–3 | TTM Phichit | Bangkok |
| | | | | Stadium: Thai-Japanese Stadium; Referee: Apisit Aonrak |

| 28 May 2010 | TTM Phichit | 0–0 | Thai Port | Phichit |
| | | | | Stadium: Phichit Stadium |

| 6 June 2010 | TTM Phichit | 0–1 | Police United | Phichit |
| | | | | Stadium: Phichit Stadium; Referee: Thaweep Inkeaw |

| 12 June 2010 | Bangkok Glass | 2–2 | TTM Phichit | Pathumthani |
| | | | | Stadium: Leo Stadium; Referee: Thanom Burikut |

| 19 June 2010 | TTM Phichit | 0–0 | Buriram PEA | Phichit |
| | | | | Stadium: Phichit Stadium; Referee: Chaiya Mahapab |

| 27 June 2010 | TTM Phichit | 0–0 | Sisaket | Phichit |
| | | | | Stadium: Phichit Stadium |

| 30 June 2010 | TTM Phichit | 0–2 | Muangthong United | Phichit |
| | | | | Stadium: Phichit Stadium; Referee: Thanom Burikut |

| 4 July 2010 | BEC Tero Sasana | 2–2 | TTM Phichit | Bangkok |
| | | | | Stadium: Thephasadin Stadium; Referee: Preecha Kangram |

| 10 July 2010 | Samut Songkhram | 0–0 | TTM Phichit | Samut Songkhram |
| | | | | Stadium: Samut Songkhram Stadium |

| 17 July 2010 | TTM Phichit | 0–2 | Rajnavy Rayong | Phichit |
| | | | | Stadium: Phichit Stadium |

| 24 July 2010 | TOT-CAT | 1–3 | TTM Phichit | Nonthaburi |
| | | | | Stadium: Yamaha Stadium; Referee: Thaweep Inkeaw |

| 30 July 2010 | Royal Thai Army | 3–2 | TTM Phichit | Nonthaburi |
| | | | | Stadium: Yamaha Stadium; Referee: Prayoon Veerapool |

| 7 August 2010 | TTM Phichit | 0–2 | Chonburi | Phichit |
| | | | | Stadium: Phichit Stadium; Referee: Preecha Kangram |

| 15 August 2010 | Pattaya United | 4–1 | TTM Phichit | Pattaya |
| | | | | Stadium: Pattaya Stadium; Referee: Prapoj Dissomsri |

| 18 August 2010 | TTM Phichit | 2–1 | Osotspa Saraburi | Phichit |
| | | | | Stadium: Phichit Stadium; Referee: Apisit Aonrak |

| 22 August 2010 | TTM Phichit | 2–1 | Bangkok United | Phichit |
| | | | | Stadium: Phichit Stadium; Referee: Badin Boundoulan |

| 11 September 2010 | TTM Phichit | 1–3 | Samut Songkhram | Phichit |
| 16.30 UTC+7 | | | | Stadium: Phichit Stadium; Referee: Chaiya Mahapab |

| 26 September 2010 | Police United | 4–1 | TTM Phichit | Pathumthani |
| | | | | Stadium: Thammasat Stadium; Referee: Prathan Nasawang |

| 29 September 2010 | TTM Phichit | 0–0 | Bangkok Glass | Phichit |
| 17.30 UTC+7 | | | | Stadium: Phichit Stadium |

| 3 October 2010 | Buriram PEA | 2–0 | TTM Phichit | Buriram |
| 17.00 UTC+7 | | | | Stadium: i-mobile Stadium; Referee: Sakda Pansut |

| 11 October 2010 | Thai Port | 1–1 | TTM Phichit | Bangkok |
| | | | | Stadium: PAT Stadium; Referee: Surasak Kundirolsirodom |

| 14 October 2010 | Muangthong United | 2–2 | TTM Phichit | Nonthaburi |
| 19.00 UTC+7 | Christian K. 8'; Koné 39' | | Kraisorn 71', 87' | Stadium: Yamaha Stadium (Thailand); Referee: Prapod Didsomsri |

| 17 October 2010 | Sisaket | 4–0 | TTM Phichit | Sisaket |
| | | | | Stadium: Sri Nakhon Lamduan Stadium; Referee: Sura Sriart |

| 24 October 2010 | TTM Phichit | 0–0 | BEC Tero Sasana | Phichit |
| 16.30 UTC+7 | | | | Stadium: Phichit Stadium; Referee: Chaiya Mahapab |

==== League table ====
| Pos | Team | Pld | W | D | L | GF | GA | GD | Pts | Qualification or relegation |
|---|---|---|---|---|---|---|---|---|---|---|
| 11 | Police United | 30 | 9 | 6 | 15 | 40 | 45 | −5 | 33 | |
| 12 | TOT-CAT | 30 | 9 | 6 | 15 | 23 | 42 | −19 | 33 | |
| 13 | TTM Phichit | 30 | 7 | 11 | 12 | 32 | 46 | −14 | 32 | |
| 14 | Sisaket | 30 | 6 | 8 | 16 | 36 | 54 | −18 | 26 | Promotion/relegation play-off |
| 15 | Bangkok United (R) | 30 | 5 | 9 | 16 | 25 | 52 | −27 | 24 | Promotion/relegation play-off |

Updated to match(es) played on 24 October 2010. Source: FIFA.com
Rules for classification: 1st points; 2nd head-to-head; 3rd match win; 4th goal difference; 5th number of goals scored
(R) Relegated

=== FA Cup ===
==== Third round ====
| 14 July 2010 | TTM Phichit | 0 – 0 (2 – 1 a.e.t.) | Police United | Phichit |
| | | | | Stadium: Phichit Stadium |

==== Fourth round ====
| 5 September 2010 | Sisaket | 3–0 | TTM Phichit | Sisaket |
| | | | | Stadium: Sri Nakhon Lamduan Stadium |

=== League Cup ===
==== First round ====
===== 1st leg =====
| 28 August 2010 | Ang Thong | 1–0 | TTM Phichit | Ang Thong |
| | | | | Stadium: Ang Thong Stadium |

===== 2nd leg =====
| 1 September 2010 | TTM Phichit | 3–1 | Ang Thong | Phichit |
| | | | | Stadium: Phichit Stadium |

==== Second round ====
===== 1st leg =====
| 22 September 2010 | Buriram PEA | 2–0 | TTM Phichit | Buriram |
| | | | | Stadium: i-mobile Stadium |

===== 2nd leg =====
| 6 October 2010 | TTM Phichit | 0–0 | Buriram PEA | Phichit |
| | | | | Stadium: Phichit Stadium |
