= 2010 TOT-CAT F.C. season =

TOT
2010 season
- Chairman: Piroj Suwannachavee
- Manager: Narong Suwannachot
- Thai Premier League: 12th
- FA Cup: Third Round
- Queen's Cup: Group stage
Home colours	Away colours

The 2010 season was TOT's 10th season in the top division of Thai football. This article shows statistics of the club's players in the season, and also lists all matches that the club played in the season.

== Chronological list of events ==
- 10 November 2009: The Thai Premier League 2010 season first leg fixtures were announced.
- 30 June 2010: TOT-CAT were knocked out of the FA Cup by Osotspa Saraburi in the third round.
- 24 October 2010: TOT-CAT finished in 12th place in the Thai Premier League.

== Squad ==
=== Current squad ===
Note: Flags indicate national team as defined under FIFA eligibility rules; some limited exceptions apply. Players may hold more than one non-FIFA nationality.

No.	Pos.	Nation	Player
1	GK	THA	Adisak Duangsri
2	DF	THA	Adulchai Sansook
3	MF	THA	Chalermwut Chaiyasol
4	MF	THA	Choosak Suwanna
5	DF	THA	Kanchit Chonlaratnomrit
6	DF	SVK	Marián Juhás
7	MF	THA	Naruecha Yantrasri
8	FW	THA	Wicha Nantasri
9	FW	SVK	Jozef Tirer
11	MF	THA	Sittisak Tarapan
12	MF	THA	Yuttana Chaikaew
13	DF	THA	Tewarit Junsom
15	FW	SVK	Tomáš Kozár
16	DF	THA	Theerachai Ngamcharoen

No.	Pos.	Nation	Player
17	FW	THA	Wichan Nantasri
18	GK	CMR	Jean-Marc Engoulou
21	MF	SVK	Anton Kubala
22	FW	SVK	Miroslav Tóth
23	DF	THA	Nakarin Fuplook
24	DF	THA	Polawat Wangkahart
25	GK	THA	Kittipong Pootaewchurk
26	DF	THA	Kittipat Wongsombat
27	DF	THA	Arthit Duangsawang
29	FW	THA	Suksamran Panthong
33	FW	THA	Amarin Sriyohajirachot
34	MF	THA	Attapon Thomma
36	MF	THA	Yuranan Ounsri
40	GK	THA	Chayanon Arbsuwan

* Players in bold have senior international caps.

=== 2010 Season transfers ===
In

Note: Flags indicate national team as defined under FIFA eligibility rules; some limited exceptions apply. Players may hold more than one non-FIFA nationality.

No.	Pos.	Nation	Player
—	FW	THA	Phuwadol Sankla (Transferred to BEC Tero Sasana F.C.)
—	GK	THA	Samuel P.Cunningham (Transferred to Buriram PEA F.C.)
—	GK	CMR	Jean-Marc Engoulou (Transferred to Chula United F.C.)
—	FW	THA	Wicharn Nantasri (Transferred to Loei City F.C.)
—	FW	THA	Wicha Nantasri (Transferred to Loei City F.C.)
—	FW	THA	Tanongsak Promdard (Transferred to TTM F.C. Phichit)
—	MF	THA	Naruecha Yantrasri (Transferred to TTM F.C. Phichit)

Out

Note: Flags indicate national team as defined under FIFA eligibility rules; some limited exceptions apply. Players may hold more than one non-FIFA nationality.

No.	Pos.	Nation	Player
—	MF	THA	Watcharapong Samarnthong (Transferred to Sisaket F.C.)
—	MF	THA	Suchao Nuchnum (Transferred to Buriram PEA F.C.)
—	FW	THA	Keerati Keawsombat (Transferred to Buriram PEA F.C.)
—	DF	THA	Pairat Tapketkaew (Transferred to Buriram PEA F.C.)
—	DF	THA	Sutad Injarern (Transferred to Buriram PEA F.C.)
—	MF	CIV	Kouadio Daniel N'Pascal (Transferred to Buriram PEA F.C.)
—	DF	CIV	Kone Seydou (Transferred to Buriram PEA F.C.)
—	MF	THA	Rattana Petch-aporn (Transferred to Buriram PEA F.C.)
—	GK	THA	Kittikun Jamsuwan (Transferred to Buriram PEA F.C.)
—	MF	THA	Kritsada Sakeaw (Transferred to Buriram PEA F.C.)
—	FW	THA	Kraisorn Sriyan (Transferred to Buriram PEA F.C.)
—	DF	THA	Wirajroj Chanteng (Transferred to Pattaya United F.C.)
—	GK	THA	Theerawat Pinpradub (Transferred to Muangthong United F.C.)
—	FW	THA	Kittipong Moonpong (Transferred to TTM F.C. Phichit)
—	FW	CMR	Madengue Moussina (Transferred to Royal Thai Army F.C.)
—	FW	BRA	Valci Junior (Transferred to Sisaket F.C.)
—	MF	BRA	Leandro Braga (Transferred to -)

== Results ==
=== Thai Premier League ===
27 March 2010	TTM Phichit	0 - 1	TOT-CAT	Phichit
				Stadium: Phichit Stadium; Referee: Wirote On-koke

3 April 2010	Sisaket	1 - 1	TOT-CAT	Sisaket
				Stadium: Sri Nakhon Lamduan Stadium

10 April 2010	TOT-CAT	2 - 0	Bangkok Glass	Nonthaburi
				Stadium: Yamaha Stadium; Referee: Sakda Pansut

17 April 2010	Buriram PEA	0 - 0	TOT-CAT	i-mobile Stadium, Buriram
				Referee: Porrached Wongkamdee

24 April 2010	TOT-CAT	2 - 1	Thai Port	Nonthaburi
				Stadium: Yamaha Stadium; Referee: Apisit Aonrak

2 May 2010	Police United	1 - 0	TOT-CAT	Bangkok
				Stadium: Thammasat Rangsit Stadium

8 May 2010	TOT-CAT	0 - 2	Chonburi	Nonthaburi
				Stadium: Yamaha Stadium; Referee: Thaweep Inkaew

16 May 2010	TOT-CAT	1 - 0	Rajnavy Rayong	Nonthaburi
				Stadium: Yamaha Stadium

22 May 2010	Osotspa Saraburi	1 - 0	TOT-CAT	M-150 Saraburi Stadium, Saraburi

29 May 2010	TOT-CAT	1 - 3	Pattaya United	Nonthaburi
				Stadium: Yamaha Stadium; Referee: Sura Sriart

5 June 2010	Royal Thai Army	0 - 1	TOT-CAT	Bangkok
				Stadium: Thai Army Sports Stadium

12 June 2010	TOT-CAT	0 - 5	BEC Tero Sasana	Nonthaburi
				Stadium: Yamaha Stadium

20 June 2010	Samut Songkhram	2 - 0	TOT-CAT	Samut Songkhram
				Stadium: Samut Songkhram Stadium

27 June 2010	TOT-CAT	1 - 0	Bangkok United	Nonthaburi
				Stadium: Yamaha Stadium

3 July 2010	Muangthong United	4 - 0	TOT-CAT	Nonthaburi
				Stadium: Yamaha Stadium

17 July 2010	Pattaya United	1 - 0	TOT-CAT	Pattaya
				Stadium: Pattaya Stadium

24 July 2010	TOT-CAT	1 - 3	TTM Phichit	Nonthaburi
				Stadium: Yamaha Stadium

28 July 2010	TOT-CAT	3 - 2	Sisaket	Nonthaburi
				Stadium: Yamaha Stadium

7 August 2010	Bangkok Glass	1 - 1	TOT-CAT	Pathumthani
				Stadium: Leo Stadium

14 August 2010	TOT-CAT	0 - 2	Buriram PEA	Nonthaburi
				Stadium: Yamaha Stadium

18 August 2010	Thai Port	1 - 1	TOT-CAT	Bangkok
				Stadium: PAT Stadium

21 August 2010	TOT-CAT	0 - 2	Police United	Nonthaburi
				Stadium: Yamaha Stadium

11 September 2010	Rajnavy Rayong	3 - 2	TOT-CAT	Rayong
				Stadium: Rayong Stadium

18 September 2010	TOT-CAT	0 - 0	Osotspa Saraburi	Nonthaburi
				Stadium: Yamaha Stadium

25 September 2010	TOT-CAT	0 - 0	Royal Thai Army	Nonthaburi
18.00 UTC+7				Stadium: Yamaha Stadium; Referee: Prayoon Veerapoon

29 September 2010	BEC Tero Sasana	1 - 0	TOT-CAT	Bangkok
18.00 UTC+7				Stadium: Thephasadin Stadium

3 October 2010	TOT-CAT	2 - 1	Samut Songkhram	Nonthaburi
18.00 UTC+7				Stadium: Yamaha Stadium

13 October 2010	Chonburi	2 – 0	TOT-CAT	Chonburi
19:00 UTC+7	Pipob 23', 66'			Stadium: IPE Chonburi Stadium

17 October 2010	Bangkok United	1 - 2	TOT-CAT	Bangkok
				Stadium: Thai-Japanese Stadium

24 October 2010	TOT-CAT	1 - 2	Muangthong United	Nonthaburi
16.30 UTC+7	Wichan 44'	report	Christian K. 71'; Dagno 88' (pen.)	Stadium: Yamaha Stadium (Thailand); Attendance: 12,570; Referee: Prapoj Dissomsri

==== League table ====
Pos	Team	Pld	W	D	L	GF	GA	GD	Pts	Qualification or relegation
10	Rajnavy Rayong	30	8	9	13	35	52	−17	33	
11	Police United	30	9	6	15	40	45	−5	33	
12	TOT-CAT	30	9	6	15	23	42	−19	33	
13	TTM Phichit	30	7	11	12	32	46	−14	32	
14	Sisaket	30	6	8	16	36	54	−18	26	Promotion/relegation play-off

Updated to match(es) played on 24 October 2010. Source: FIFA.com
Rules for classification: 1st points; 2nd head-to-head; 3rd match win; 4th goal difference; 5th number of goals scored

=== FA Cup ===
30 June 2010	TOT-CAT	1 - 1 (4 - 5 p.)	Osotspa Saraburi	Nonthaburi
18.00 UTC+7				Stadium: Yamaha Stadium; Referee: Porached Wongkamdee

=== League Cup ===
==== First round ====
===== 1st leg =====
28 August 2010	Kasem Bundit University	0 - 4	TOT-CAT	Bangkok
				Stadium: Kasem Bundit University Stadium

===== 2nd leg =====
1 September 2010	TOT-CAT	2 - 1	Kasem Bundit University	Nonthaburi
				Stadium: Yamaha Stadium

==== Second round ====
===== 1st leg =====
7 September 2010	Chanthaburi	1 - 2	TOT-CAT	Chanthaburi
				Stadium: Chanthaburi Stadium; Referee: Preecha Kangram

===== 2nd leg =====
14 September 2010	TOT-CAT	0 - 0	Chanthaburi	Nonthaburi
				Stadium: Yamaha Stadium

=== Queen's Cup ===
7 February 2010	TOT	0 – 0	Hakka-Sriracha	Rayong Stadium, Rayong
16:00 UTC+7

9 February 2010	TOT	0 – 1	Police United	Rayong Stadium, Rayong
16:00 UTC+7			Surapong 38'

11 February 2010	Rajnavy Rayong	0 – 1	TOT	Rayong Stadium, Rayong
18:30 UTC+7			Miloslav 56'
