= 2010 Bangkok Glass F.C. season =

Bangkok Glass
2010 season
- Chairman: Pavin Bhirom Bhakdi
- Head Coach: Surachai Jaturapattarapong
- Thai Premier League: 5th
- FA Cup: Third round
- League Cup: Quarter-final
- Singapore Cup: Champions

The 2010 season was Bangkok Glass's 2nd season in the top division of Thai football. This article shows statistics of the club's players in the season, and also lists all matches that the club played in the season.

== Chronological list of events ==
- 10 November 2009: The Thai Premier League 2010 season first leg fixtures were announced.
- 7 July 2010: Bangkok Glass is kicked out of the FA Cup in the third round by Rajnavy Rayong.
- 24 October 2010: Bangkok Glass finished in 5th place in the Thai Premier League.

== Squad ==
Note: Flags indicate national team as defined under FIFA eligibility rules; some limited exceptions apply. Players may hold more than one non-FIFA nationality.

No.	Pos.	Nation	Player
1	GK	THA	Kittisak Rawangpa
2	DF	THA	Polawat Wangkahart
3	DF	THA	Decha Phetakua
4	DF	THA	Wachira Sangsri
6	DF	THA	Amnaj Kaewkiew (captain)
7	MF	THA	Anon Boonsukco
8	DF	THA	Rungroj Sawangsri (1st vice captain)
9	FW	NGA	Ajayi Samuel
10	MF	THA	Sutee Suksomkit
11	MF	THA	Sarun Promkaew
12	FW	BRA	Ney Fabiano
13	FW	THA	Wutthipong Kerdkul
14	FW	CMR	Bekombo Ekollo
15	MF	THA	Anawin Jujeen

No.	Pos.	Nation	Player
16	MF	THA	Tanat Wongsuparak
17	DF	THA	Supachai Komsilp (2nd vice captain)
18	GK	THA	Kritsana Klanklin
20	MF	JPN	Hironori Saruta
21	DF	THA	Panuwat Failai
23	MF	THA	Peerapong Pichitchotirat
25	GK	THA	Kritsakorn Kerdpol
29	FW	THA	Chatree Chimtalay
30	MF	THA	Manus Hartwiset
31	MF	THA	Wichaya Dechmitr
33	MF	CIV	Koné Kassim
34	MF	THA	Surachet Ngamtip
35	DF	THA	Tanongsak Prajakkata

=== Transfers ===
In

Note: Flags indicate national team as defined under FIFA eligibility rules; some limited exceptions apply. Players may hold more than one non-FIFA nationality.

No.	Pos.	Nation	Player
—	GK	THA	Kittisak Rawangpa (Transferred from Osotsapa)
—	GK	THA	Kritsakorn Kerdpol (Transferred from TTM Phichit)
—	DF	THA	Panuwat Failai (Transferred from TTM Phichit)
—	MF	JPN	Hironori Saruta (Transferred from Sriracha)
—	FW	BRA	Ney Fabiano (Transferred from Melbourne Victory)
—	FW	THA	Wutthipong Kerdkul (Transferred from Chang Chiangmai RBAC)
—	MF	THA	Wichaya Dechmitr (Transferred from Tampines Rovers FC)
—	MF	THA	Sutee Suksomkit (Transferred from Melbourne Victory)
—	FW	CMR	Bekombo Ekollo (Transferred from TTM Phichit)

Out

Note: Flags indicate national team as defined under FIFA eligibility rules; some limited exceptions apply. Players may hold more than one non-FIFA nationality.

No.	Pos.	Nation	Player
—	GK	THA	Naratip Phanprom (Transferred to Bangkok United)
—	DF	THA	Tada Keelalai (Transferred to Chanthaburi F.C.)
—	DF	THA	Surachet Phupa (Transferred to Chanthaburi F.C.)
—	DF	THA	Supachai Phupa (Transferred to Chanthaburi F.C.)
—	MF	THA	Kittipong Rongrak (Transferred to-)
—	MF	THA	Nahathai Suksombat (Transferred to Osotsapa)
—	FW	CHI	Nelson San Martín (Transferred to Home United)
—	FW	THA	Metee Pungpoh (Transferred to Chiangrai United)
—	FW	THA	Nantawat Tansopa (Transferred to Police United FC)

=== Out on loan ===
Note: Flags indicate national team as defined under FIFA eligibility rules; some limited exceptions apply. Players may hold more than one non-FIFA nationality.

No.	Pos.	Nation	Player
—	DF	THA	Kraikiat Beadtaku (at Chanthaburi F.C.)

== Matches ==
=== League ===
24 March 2010	Bangkok Glass	1–0	Police United	Thanyaburi
	Supachai 76'			Stadium: Leo Stadium; Attendance: 7,000; Referee: Porrachet Wongkamdee

3 April 2010	Samut Songkhram	1–0	Bangkok Glass	Samut Songkhram
	Pichet 75'			Stadium: Samut Songkhram Stadium

10 April 2010	TOT-CAT	2–0	Bangkok Glass	Nonthaburi
	Tóth 31'; Kubala 40'			Stadium: Yamaha Stadium

18 April 2010	Bangkok Glass	3–1	Royal Thai Army	Thanyaburi
	Chatree 23'; Sutee 30', 55'		Mongkol 34'	Stadium: Leo Stadium; Referee: Thaweep Inkaew

24 April 2010	Bangkok Glass	1–0	Muangthong United	Thanyaburi
	Amnaj 90'			Stadium: Leo Stadium; Referee: Chaiya Mahapab

25 April 2010	Pattaya United	1–1	Bangkok Glass	Pattaya
	Jérémy 46'		Sutee 85'	Stadium: Nongprue Municipality Football Field; Referee: Surasak Kundiloksirodom

8 May 2010	Bangkok Glass	0–0	Osotspa Saraburi	Thanyaburi
				Stadium: Leo Stadium; Referee: Mongkolchai Pechsri

16 May 2010	Bangkok Glass	3–1	Sisaket	Thanyaburi
				Stadium: Leo Stadium; Referee: Sura Sriart

23 May 2010	Chonburi	2–1	Bangkok Glass	Chonburi
				Stadium: IPE Chonburi Stadium; Referee: Porrachet Wongkamdee

6 June 2010	Buriram PEA	3–1	Bangkok Glass	Buriram
				Stadium: i-mobile Stadium; Referee: Preecha Kangram

12 June 2010	Bangkok Glass	2–2	TTM Phichit	Thanyaburi
				Stadium: Leo Stadium; Referee: Thanom Burikut

19 June 2010	Bangkok United	1–4	Bangkok Glass	Bangkok
				Referee: Atthakorn Wetchakan

26 June 2010	Bangkok Glass	5–0	Rajnavy Rayong	Thanyaburi
				Stadium: Leo Stadium; Referee: Chaiya Mahapab

3 July 2010	Thai Port	2–1	Bangkok Glass	Bangkok
				Stadium: PAT Stadium

18 July 2010	Police United	3–2	Bangkok Glass	Pathumthani
				Stadium: Thammasat Stadium

24 July 2010	Bangkok Glass	2–2	BEC Tero Sasana	Pathumthani
				Stadium: Leo Stadium

28 July 2010	Bangkok Glass	3–1	Samut Songkhram	Pathumthani
				Stadium: Leo Stadium

7 August 2010	Bangkok Glass	1–1	TOT-CAT	Pathumthani
				Stadium: Leo Stadium

15 August 2010	Royal Thai Army	1–3	Bangkok Glass	Bangkok
				Stadium: Thai Army Sports Stadium

18 August 2010	Muangthong United	2–0	Bangkok Glass	Nonthaburi
				Stadium: Yamaha Stadium

21 August 2010	Bangkok Glass	3–1	Pattaya United	Pathumthani
				Stadium: Leo Stadium

11 September 2010	Sisaket	1–2	Bangkok Glass	Sisaket
				Stadium: Sisaket Stadium

19 September 2010	Bangkok Glass	0–0	Chonburi	Pathumthani
				Stadium: Leo Stadium

26 September 2010	Bangkok Glass	0–3	Buriram PEA	Pathumthani
				Stadium: Leo Stadium

29 September 2010	TTM Phichit	0–0	Bangkok Glass	Phichit
17.30 UTC+7				Stadium: Phichit Stadium

2 October 2010	Bangkok Glass	4–0	Bangkok United	Pathumthani
				Stadium: Leo Stadium

13 October 2010	Osotspa Saraburi	4–1	Bangkok Glass	Saraburi
				Stadium: M-150 Saraburi Stadium

17 October 2010	Rajnavy Rayong	3–3	Bangkok Glass	Rayong
17.oo UTC+7				Stadium: Rayong Stadium

==== League table ====
Pos	Team	Pld	W	D	L	GF	GA	GD	Pts	Qualification or relegation
3	Chonburi (Q)	30	17	9	4	57	28	+29	60	2011 AFC Cup Group stage round (Note: via FA Cup winners)
4	Thai Port	30	13	9	8	41	29	+12	48	
5	Bangkok Glass	30	12	9	9	48	38	+10	45	
6	Pattaya United	30	12	9	9	43	38	+5	45	
7	Osotspa M-150 Saraburi	30	10	12	8	32	30	+2	42	

Updated to match(es) played on 24 October 2010. Source: FIFA.com
Rules for classification: 1st points; 2nd head-to-head; 3rd match win; 4th goal difference; 5th number of goals scored
(Q) Qualified for the phase indicated

=== FA Cup ===
==== Third round ====
7 July 2010	Rajnavy Rayong	1–0	Bangkok Glass	Rayong
				Stadium: Rayong Stadium

=== League Cup ===
==== First round ====
===== 1st leg =====
29 August 2010	Nonthaburi	0–2	Bangkok Glass	Nonthaburi
				Stadium: King Rama 9 Commemorative Stadium

===== 2nd leg =====
1 September 2010	Bangkok Glass	4–0	Nonthaburi	Pathumthani
				Stadium: Leo Stadium

==== Second round ====
===== 1st leg =====
20 October 2010	Chonburi	0–2	Bangkok Glass	Chonburi
19.00 UTC+7				Stadium: IPE Chonburi Stadium; Referee: Prapod Didsomsri

===== 2nd leg =====
22 September 2010	Bangkok Glass	1–0	Chonburi	Pathumthani
19.00 UTC+7				Stadium: Leo Stadium; Referee: Apisit Aonrak

=== Singapore Cup ===
==== Round of 16 ====
May 27, 2010
19:45

SAFFC (Singapore)	3–5	(Thailand) Bangkok Glass
Wilkinson 6', 41'; Martinez 53' (pen.)	Preview; Details; Report	Anawin 4'; Sutee 59', 67'; Chatree 78'; Ekollo 90'

Choa Chu Kang Stadium
Attendance: 2,376
Referee: Leow Thiam Hoe

==== Quarter-final ====
===== 1st leg =====
October 5, 2010
19:30

South Melbourne (Australia)	1–3	(Thailand) Bangkok Glass
Vasilevski 20'		Sarun 60' Gbenga 70' Chatree 82'

Jalan Besar Stadium
Attendance: 1,045
Referee: Abas Daud

===== 2nd leg =====
October 8, 2010
19:30

Bangkok Glass (Thailand)	3–3	(Australia) South Melbourne
Chimtale 27', 41'; Ajayi 86'	Preview; Details	Gianni De Nittis 31', 74'; Fernando 37' (pen.)

Jalan Besar Stadium
Attendance: 931

Glass won 6–4 on aggregate.
