= 2010 Thai Port F.C. season =

Thai Port
2010 season
- Chairman: Pichet Mankong
- Manager: Sasom Pobprasert
- Thai Premier League: 4th
- FA Cup: Third round
- Queen's Cup: Group stage
- AFC Cup: Quarter finalist
- Kor Royal Cup: Runner-up
- League Cup: Winner
Home colours	Away colours

The 2010 season was Thai Port's 14th season in the top division of Thai football. This article shows statistics of the club's players in the season, and also lists all matches that the club played in the season.

Thai Port reached the quarterfinals of the AFC Cup, where they lost to Qadsia SC.

== Chronological list of events ==
- 10 November 2009: The Thai Premier League 2010 season first leg fixtures were announced.
- 23 June 2010: Thai Port were knocked out of the FA Cup by Pattaya United in the third round.
- 24 October 2010: Thai Port finished in 4th place in the Thai Premier League.

== Pre-season ==
20 December 2009	Chonburi	1 – 2	Thai Port	Chonburi
16:30 UTC+7	Suphasek.K 75'	(Report); Report	Teerawut.S 72'; Sarayoot.C 82' (pen.)	Stadium: Sirindhorn Stadium

26 December 2009	Thai Port	2 – 1	Thanh Hóa	Bangkok
17:00 UTC+7	Jakkrit.B 44'; Sarayoot.C 55'	(Report)		Stadium: PAT Stadium

9 January 2010	Thai Port	3 – 1	Chula United	Bangkok
16:30 UTC+7	Sarayoot.C 20', (?); Kiatjarern.R (?)	(Report)		Stadium: PAT Stadium

14 January 2010	Thai Port	1 – 2	Chainat	Bangkok
16:00 UTC+7	Pana.K (?)	(Report)		Stadium: PAT Stadium

15 January 2010	Thai Port	0 – 1	Thai Honda	Bangkok
16:00 UTC+7		(Report)		Stadium: PAT Stadium

23 January 2010	Muangkan	1 – 4	Thai Port	Kanchanaburi
16:30 UTC+7		(Report)	Sarayoot.C (?), (?); Songsak.C (?); Pitipong.K (?)	Stadium: Kleab Bua Stadium

24 January 2010	Nakhon Pathom	2 – 4	Thai Port	Nakhon Pathom
16:30 UTC+7		(Report)	Yai.N (?); Worawut.W (?); Own goal (?); Own goal (?)	Stadium: Kasetsart Kampangsan University Stadium

27 January 2010	Thai Port	2 – 2	Tampines Rovers	Bangkok
17:00 UTC+7	Sarayoot.C (?), (?)	(Report)	Qiu Li (?); Aleksander Duric (?)	Stadium: PAT Stadium

3 February 2010	Thai Port	4 – 1	Myanmar	Bangkok
17:00 UTC+7	Sarayoot.C 28'; Yai.N 51', 58'; Todsapol.L 81'	(Report)		Stadium: PAT Stadium

== League table ==
Pos	Team	Pld	W	D	L	GF	GA	GD	Pts	Qualification or relegation
2	Buriram PEA	30	17	12	1	51	19	+32	63	
3	Chonburi (Q)	30	17	9	4	57	28	+29	60	2011 AFC Cup Group stage round (Note: via FA Cup winners)
4	Thai Port	30	13	9	8	41	29	+12	48	
5	Bangkok Glass	30	12	9	9	48	38	+10	45	
6	Pattaya United	30	12	9	9	43	38	+5	45	

Updated to match(es) played on 24 October 2010. Source: FIFA.com
Rules for classification: 1st points; 2nd head-to-head; 3rd match win; 4th goal difference; 5th number of goals scored
(Q) Qualified for the phase indicated

== Matches ==
=== League ===
21 March 2010	Samut Songkhram	1 – 0	Thai Port	Samut Songkhram Stadium, Samut Songkhram

28 March 2010	Osotspa Saraburi	1 – 0	Thai Port	M-150 Saraburi Stadium, Saraburi

3 April 2010	Thai Port	3 – 2	Police United	Thanyaburi
				Stadium: Leo Stadium; Referee: Prathan Nasawang

11 April 2010	Thai Port	1 – 4	Muangthong United	Bangkok
				Stadium: Suphachalasai Stadium; Referee: Chaiya Mahapab

24 April 2010	TOT-CAT	2 – 1	Thai Port	Nonthaburi
				Stadium: Yamaha Stadium; Referee: Apisit Aonrak

2 May 2010	Thai Port	2 – 0	Sisaket	Bangkok
				Stadium: Suphachalasai Stadium; Referee: Prathan Nasawang

5 May 2010	Thai Port	3 – 0	Rajnavy Rayong	Bangkok
				Stadium: PAT Stadium; Referee: Thaweep Inkaew

16 May 2010	Buriram PEA	0 – 0	Thai Port	Buriram
				Stadium: i-mobile Stadium; Referee: Chaiya Mahapab

28 May 2010	TTM Phichit	0 – 0	Thai Port	Phichit
				Stadium: Phichit Stadium

6 June 2010	Thai Port	3 – 2	Bangkok United	Bangkok
				Stadium: PAT Stadium

13 June 2010	Chonburi	2 – 1	Thai Port	Chonburi
				Stadium: IPE Chonburi Stadium

20 June 2010	Thai Port	2 – 0	Pattaya United	Bangkok
				Stadium: PAT Stadium

27 June 2010	Royal Thai Army	0 – 2	Thai Port	Bangkok
				Stadium: Thai Army Sports Stadium

30 June 2010	Thai Port	1 – 0	BEC Tero Sasana	Bangkok
				Stadium: PAT Stadium

3 July 2010	Thai Port	2 – 1	Bangkok Glass	Bangkok
				Stadium: PAT Stadium

17 July 2010	Thai Port	1 – 0	Samut Songkhram	Bangkok
				Stadium: PAT Stadium

25 July 2010	Thai Port	1 – 1	Osotspa Saraburi	Bangkok
				Stadium: PAT Stadium

28 July 2010	Police United	0 – 1	Thai Port	Bangkok
				Stadium: Thammasat Stadium

8 August 2010	Muangthong United	1 – 0	Thai Port	Nonthaburi
				Stadium: Yamaha Stadium

15 August 2010	Rajnavy Rayong	2 – 4	Thai Port	Rayong
				Stadium: Rayong Stadium

18 August 2010	Thai Port	1 – 1	TOT-CAT	Bangkok
				Stadium: PAT Stadium

22 August 2010	Sisaket	1 – 1	Thai Port	Sisaket
				Stadium: Sri Nakhon Lamduan Stadium

11 September 2010	Thai Port	0 – 0	Buriram PEA	Bangkok
				Stadium: PAT Stadium

26 September 2010	Bangkok United	1 – 1	Thai Port	Bangkok
				Stadium: Thai-Japanese Stadium

29 September 2010	Thai Port	1 – 2	Chonburi	Bangkok
				Stadium: PAT Stadium

2 October 2010	Pattaya United	0 – 1	Thai Port	Pattaya
				Stadium: Nongprue Municipality Football Field

11 October 2010	Thai Port	1 – 1	TTM Phichit	Bangkok
				Stadium: PAT Stadium

14 October 2010	BEC Tero Sasana	4 – 2	Thai Port	Bangkok
				Stadium: Thephasadin Stadium

17 October 2010	Thai Port	5 – 0	Royal Thai Army	Bangkok
				Stadium: PAT Stadium

=== FA Cup ===
==== Third round ====
23 June 2010	Thai Port	2 – 3	Pattaya United	Bangkok
				Stadium: PAT Stadium; Referee: Preecha Kangram

=== League Cup ===
==== First round ====
===== 1st leg =====
29 August 2010	Bangkok	0 – 3	Thai Port	Bangkok
				Stadium: 72-years Anniversary Stadium

===== 2nd leg =====
1 September 2010	Thai Port	1 – 3	Bangkok	Bangkok
				Stadium: PAT Stadium

==== Second round ====
===== 1st leg =====
8 September 2010	Roi Et United	1 – 0	Thai Port	Roi Et
				Stadium: Roi Et Stadium

===== 2nd leg =====
15 September 2010	Thai Port	2 – 0	Roi Et United	Bangkok
				Stadium: PAT Stadium

=== Isuzu Cup ===
29 January 2010	Thai Port	2 – 1	Songkhla	Trang
16:30 UTC+7	Pitipong.K (?); Own goal (?)	(Report)		Stadium: Trang Stadium

31 January 2010	Thai Port	5 – 1	Phuket	Trang
18:30 UTC+7	Pitipong.K (?), (?), (?); Itthipol.N (?); Ekkachai.S (?)	(Report)		Stadium: Trang Stadium

=== Kor Royal Cup ===
20 February 2010	Muangthong United	2 – 0	Thai Port	Bangkok
17:00 UTC+7	Koné; Siaka			Stadium: Suphachalasai Stadium; Referee: Attakorn Vetchakarn

=== Queen's Cup ===
6 February 2010	Thai Port	4 – 4	Samut Songkhram	Saraburi
16:00 UTC+7	Jakkrit.B 34'; Sarayoot.C 39', 47', 67' (pen.)	(Report)	Jirawat.K 5'; Apinan.K 17'; Bireme Diouf 45'; Sittipan.C 83'	Stadium: Saraburi Central Stadium

8 February 2010	Royal Thai Army	2 – 0	Thai Port	Saraburi
16:00 UTC+7	88'; 93'	(Report)		Stadium: Saraburi Central Stadium

10 February 2010	Osotspa Saraburi	1 – 3	Thai Port	Saraburi
18:30 UTC+7	Suradetch.T 14'	(Report)	Songsak.C 10', 30'; Edvaldo 53'	Stadium: Saraburi Central Stadium

=== AFC Cup ===
==== Group stage ====
24 February 2010
17:00 UTC+7

Thai Port (Thailand)	2 – 3	(Vietnam) Đà Nẵng
Jirawat 18'; Pitipong 90+2'	Report	Merlo 29'; Hernández 59'; Phan Thanh Hưng 84'

Suphachalasai Stadium, Bangkok
Attendance: 400
Referee: Fan Qi (China)

17 March 2010
20:00 UTC+8

NT Realty Wofoo Tai Po (Hong Kong)	0 – 1	(Thailand) Thai Port
		Pitipong 48'

Tseung Kwan O Sports Ground, Hong Kong

24 March 2010
17:00 UTC+7

Thai Port (Thailand)	2 – 2	(Singapore) Geylang United
Jirawat (?); Sompong (?)		Moise (?); Tomko (?)

Suphachalasai Stadium, Bangkok

6 April 2010
19:30 (UTC+8)

Geylang United (Singapore)	0 – 1	(Thailand) Thai Port
	Report	Kiatjarern 58'

Jalan Besar Stadium, Singapore
Attendance: 1,120
Referee: Matsuo Hajime (Japan)

20 April 2010
16:00 UTC+7

Đà Nẵng (Vietnam)	0 – 0	(Thailand) Thai Port

Chi Lăng Stadium, Da Nang

27 April 2010
18:30 UTC+7

Thai Port (Thailand)	2 – 0	(Hong Kong) NT Realty Wofoo Tai Po

Surakul Stadium, Phuket Province

==== Round of 16 ====
12 May 2010
16:00 (UTC+7)

Sriwijaya (Indonesia)	1 – 4	(Thailand) Thai Port
Obiora 7'	Report	Sarayoot 36', 49', 76'; Sompong 45'

Jakabaring Stadium, Palembang
Attendance: 9,000
Referee: Shamsuzzaman Tayeb Hasan (Bangladesh)

==== Quarter-finals ====
===== 1st leg =====
14 September 2010
18:30 (UTC+7)

Thai Port (Thailand)	0 – 0	(Kuwait) Al-Qadsia

Suphachalasai Stadium, Bangkok
Referee: Peter Green (referee) (Australia)

===== 2nd leg =====
21 September 2010
19:45 (UTC+3)

Al-Qadsia (Kuwait)	3 – 0	(Thailand) Thai Port

Mohammed Al-Hamad Stadium, Hawally
Referee: Masoud Moradi (Iran)
