= 2010 Buriram PEA F.C. season =

Buriram PEA
2010 season
- Chairman: Surajit Kalayanamitr
- Manager: Prajuk Viengsong
- Thai Premier League: 2nd
- FA Cup: Fourth Round
- League Cup: Runner Up
Home colours	Away colours

The 2010 season was PEA's 6th season in the top division of Thai football. This article shows statistics of the club's players in the season, and also lists all matches that the club played in the season.

== Chronological list of events ==
- 10 November 2009: The Thai Premier League 2010 season first leg fixtures were announced.
- 26 August 2010: Buriram PEA were knocked out of the Thai FA Cup by Royal Thai Army in the fourth round.
- 24 October 2010: Buriram PEA finished in 2nd place in the Thai Premier League.

== Squad ==
As of 1 August 2010

=== Current squad ===
Note: Flags indicate national team as defined under FIFA eligibility rules; some limited exceptions apply. Players may hold more than one non-FIFA nationality.

No.	Pos.	Nation	Player
1	GK	THA	Umarin Yaodam
2	DF	THA	Theeratorn Boonmatan
3	MF	THA	Weerayut Jitkuntod
4	DF	THA	Pairat Tapketkaew
5	MF	CIV	Kouadio Pascal
7	MF	THA	Rangsan Viwatchaichok (vice captain)
8	MF	THA	Suchao Nuchnum
10	FW	THA	Keerati Keawsombat
11	DF	THA	Apichet Puttan (captain)
15	DF	CMR	Henri Jöel
16	MF	THA	Rattana Petch-Aporn
17	FW	BRA	Dudu

No.	Pos.	Nation	Player
18	GK	THA	Sivaruck Tedsungnoen
19	FW	THA	Suriya Domtaisong
20	FW	CIV	Seydou Koné
21	DF	THA	Songsak Chaisamak
22	FW	THA	Kaneung Buransook
23	DF	THA	Sutad Injarern
25	GK	THA	Kittikun Jamsuwan
26	MF	THA	Phonlawut Donjui
27	FW	BRA	Douglas
28	DF	BRA	Lexe
29	FW	THA	Pipat Thonkanya
30	MF	BRA	Simão Wellington

=== 2010 Season transfers ===
In

Note: Flags indicate national team as defined under FIFA eligibility rules; some limited exceptions apply. Players may hold more than one non-FIFA nationality.

No.	Pos.	Nation	Player
—	GK	THA	Sivaruck Tedsungnoen (Transferred from BEC Tero Sasana F.C.)
—	MF	THA	Salahudin Arware (Transferred from Muangthong United F.C.)
—	MF	THA	Chatprapob Usaprom (Transferred from TTM Phichit)
—	MF	THA	Suchao Nuchnum (Transferred from TOT-CAT F.C.)
—	FW	THA	Keerati Keawsombat (Transferred from TOT-CAT F.C.)
—	DF	THA	Pairat Tapketkaew (Transferred from TOT-CAT F.C.)
—	DF	CIV	Kone Seydou (Transferred from TOT-CAT F.C.)
—	DF	CIV	Kouadio Daniel N'Pascal (Transferred from TOT-CAT F.C.)
—	MF	THA	Rattana Petch-aporn (Transferred from TOT-CAT F.C.)
—	DF	THA	Sutad Injarern (Transferred from TOT-CAT F.C.)
—	MF	THA	Kritsada Sakeaw (Transferred from TOT-CAT F.C.)
—	FW	THA	Kraisorn Sriyan (Transferred from TOT-CAT F.C.)
—	GK	THA	Kittikun Jamsuwan (Transferred from TOT-CAT F.C.)
—	GK	THA	Ukrit Wongmeema (Transferred from Muangthong United F.C.)

Out

Note: Flags indicate national team as defined under FIFA eligibility rules; some limited exceptions apply. Players may hold more than one non-FIFA nationality.

No.	Pos.	Nation	Player
—	DF	THA	Panupong Wongsa (Transferred to Muangthong United F.C.)
—	MF	THA	Apipu Suntornpanavej (Transferred to Osotspa Saraburi F.C.)
—	MF	THA	Chaiwut Wattana (Transferred to Chainat F.C.)
—	MF	THA	Narongchai Vachiraban (Transferred to Police United F.C.)
—	FW	LAO	Lamnao Singto (Transferred to -)
—	DF	THA	Patiparn Phetphun (Transferred to Bangkok United F.C.)
—	MF	THA	Sattrupai Sri-narong (Transferred to Bangkok United F.C.)
—	MF	THA	Watchara Mahawong (Transferred to Chanthaburi F.C.)
—	GK	THA	Witsanusak Kaewruang (Transferred to Songkhla F.C.)
—	GK	THA	Samuel P.Cunningham (Transferred to TOT-CAT F.C.)
—	FW	GHA	Victor Mansah (Transferred to Buriram F.C.)
—	GK	THA	Ukrit Wongmeema (Transferred to Buriram F.C.)

== Results ==
=== Thai Premier League ===
27 March 2010	Buriram PEA	3–1	Samut Songkhram	Buriram
				Stadium: i-mobile Stadium

4 April 2010	Buriram PEA	1–1	BEC Tero Sasana	Buriram
				Stadium: i-mobile Stadium

17 April 2010	Buriram PEA	0–0	TOT-CAT	Buriram
				Stadium: i-mobile Stadium; Referee: Porrachet Wongkamdee

25 April 2010	Pattaya United	3–3	Buriram PEA	Pattaya
				Stadium: Nongprue Municipality Football Field; Referee: Chai

5 May 2010	Muangthong United	0–0	Buriram PEA	Nonthaburi
			Pascal (red card) 90+2'	Stadium: Yamaha Stadium; Referee: Sura Sriart

9 May 2010	Buriram PEA	3–1	Royal Thai Army	Buriram
	Rangsan 2', 7'; Kaneung 58'; Dudu (red card) 90'		Jakkrapong 37' (pen.) (red card) 90'; Wittaya (red card) 71'	Stadium: i-mobile Stadium; Attendance: 12,784; Referee: Prathan Nasawang

16 May 2010	Buriram PEA	0–0	Thai Port	Buriram
				Stadium: i-mobile Stadium; Referee: Chaiya Mahapab

22 May 2010	Rajnavy Rayong	0–0	Buriram PEA	Rayong
				Stadium: Rayong Stadium; Referee: Chaiya Mahapab

28 May 2010	Buriram PEA	2–0	Osotspa Saraburi	Buriram
				Stadium: i-mobile Stadium; Referee: Atthakorn Wechakan

1 June 2010	Buriram PEA	0–0	Bangkok United	Buriram
				Stadium: i-mobile Stadium

6 June 2010	Buriram PEA	3–1	Bangkok Glass	Buriram
				Stadium: i-mobile Stadium

13 June 2010	Buriram PEA	1–0	Sisaket	Buriram
				Stadium: i-mobile Stadium; Referee: Sura Sriart

19 June 2010	TTM Phichit	0–0	Buriram PEA	Phichit
				Stadium: Phichit Stadium

26 June 2010	Buriram PEA	3–1	Chonburi	Buriram
				Stadium: i-mobile Stadium; Referee: Thanom Burikut

3 July 2010	Police United	1–1	Buriram PEA	Pathumthani
				Stadium: Thammasat Stadium; Referee: Sura Sriart

17 July 2010	Osotspa Saraburi	0–1	Buriram PEA	Saraburi
				Stadium: Saraburi Stadium; Referee: Prathan Nasawang

24 July 2010	Samut Songkhram	0–0	Buriram PEA	Samut Songkhram
				Stadium: Samut Songkhram Stadium

28 July 2010	BEC Tero Sasana	1–4	Buriram PEA	Bangkok
				Stadium: Thephasadin Stadium

7 August 2010	Bangkok United	2–0	Buriram PEA	Bangkok
				Stadium: Rangsit Stadium

14 August 2010	TOT-CAT	0–2	Buriram PEA	Nonthaburi
18.00 UTC+7				Stadium: TOT Stadium Chaeng Watthana

18 August 2010	Buriram PEA	3–1	Pattaya United	Buriram
				Stadium: i-mobile Stadium

22 August 2010	Buriram PEA	1–0	Muangthong United	Buriram
18.00 UTC+7				Stadium: i-mobile Stadium

11 September 2010	Thai Port	0–0	Buriram PEA	Bangkok
17.00 UTC+7				Stadium: PAT Stadium; Referee: Prapoj Dissomsri

18 September 2010	Buriram PEA	4–2	Rajnavy Rayong	Buriram
17.00 UTC+7				Stadium: i-mobile Stadium

26 September 2010	Bangkok Glass	0–3	Buriram PEA	Pathumthani
18.00 UTC+7				Stadium: Leo Stadium

3 October 2010	Buriram PEA	2–0	TTM Phichit	Buriram
17.00 UTC+7				Stadium: i-mobile Stadium

13 October 2010	Royal Thai Army	0–2	Buriram PEA	Bangkok
18.00 UTC+7				Stadium: Thai Army Sports Stadium; Referee: Thaweep Inkaew

17 October 2010	Chonburi	2–2	Buriram PEA	Chonburi
18.00 UTC+7				Stadium: IPE Chonburi Stadium

20 October 2010	Sisaket	0–3	Buriram PEA	Sisaket
15.30 UTC+7				Stadium: Sri Nakhon Lamduan Stadium

24 October 2010	Buriram PEA	4–2	Insee Police United	Buriram
16.30 UTC+7				Stadium: i-mobile Stadium; Referee: Sura Sriart

==== League table ====
Pos	Team	Pld	W	D	L	GF	GA	GD	Pts	Qualification or relegation
1	Muangthong United (C, Q)	30	20	7	3	64	19	+45	67	2011 AFC Champions League play-off round
2	Buriram PEA	30	17	12	1	51	19	+32	63	
3	Chonburi (Q)	30	17	9	4	57	28	+29	60	2011 AFC Cup Group stage round (Note: via FA Cup winners)
4	Thai Port	30	13	9	8	41	29	+12	48	
5	Bangkok Glass	30	12	9	9	48	38	+10	45	

Updated to match(es) played on 24 October 2010. Source: FIFA.com
Rules for classification: 1st points; 2nd head-to-head; 3rd match win; 4th goal difference; 5th number of goals scored
(C) Champions; (Q) Qualified for the phase indicated

=== FA Cup ===
==== Third round ====
16 June 2010	Buriram PEA	6–0	Raj-Vithi	Buriram
				Stadium: i-mobile Stadium

==== Fourth round ====
26 August 2010	Royal Thai Army	1–0	Buriram PEA	Bangkok
18.00 UTC+7				Stadium: Thai Army Sports Stadium; Referee: Sura Sriart

=== League Cup ===
==== First round ====
===== 1st leg =====
28 August 2010	Kalasin	0–1	Buriram PEA	Kalasin
				Stadium: Kalasin Stadium

===== 2nd leg =====
15 September 2010	Buriram PEA	10–0	Kalasin	Buriram
				Stadium: i-mobile Stadium

==== Second round ====
===== 1st leg =====
22 September 2010	Buriram PEA	2–0	TTM Phichit	Buriram
				Stadium: i-mobile Stadium

===== 2nd leg =====
6 October 2010	TTM Phichit	0–0	Buriram PEA	Phichit
				Stadium: Phichit Stadium
