= 2010 Royal Thai Army F.C. season =

Royal Thai Army
2010 season
- Chairman: Supanut Kaewhirun
- Manager: Kwan Rattanarungsee
- Thai Premier League: 20th
- Queen's Cup: Quarter-finals
- League Cup: Second round
Home colours	Away colours

The 2010 season was the Royal Thai Army's 1st season back in the top division of Thai football after promotion from the 1st division. This article shows statistics of the club's players in the season, and also lists all matches that the club played in the season.

== Chronological list of events ==
- 10 November 2009: The Thai Premier League 2010 season first leg fixtures were announced.
- 6 October 2010: Royal Thai Army were knocked out of the Thai League Cup by Nong Khai in the second round.
- 13 October 2010: Royal Thai Army were relegated from the Thai Premier League on their 1st season back.
- 24 October 2010: Royal Thai Army finished in 20th place in the Thai Premier League.

== Current squad ==
Note: Flags indicate national team as defined under FIFA eligibility rules; some limited exceptions apply. Players may hold more than one non-FIFA nationality.

No.	Pos.	Nation	Player
1	GK	THA	Supachat Apichatyanon
2	DF	THA	Sarawut Thongsawad
3	DF	THA	Dawut Dinket
4	DF	THA	Wittaya Po-Yord
5	DF	THA	Chaiwat Nark-Iam (captain)
6	DF	THA	Nipol Kamthong
7	MF	THA	Jakkrapong Somboon
8	MF	THA	Samreng Sittiyotee
9	DF	THA	Tatree Sing-Ha
10	FW	THA	Somporn Tanyajarern
11	MF	THA	Mongkol Tossakrai
12	MF	THA	Trakoolchat Thongbai
13	MF	THA	Tanakorn Dangthong
14	DF	THA	Chatchai Mokkasem
15	DF	THA	Wanchana Rattana

No.	Pos.	Nation	Player
16	MF	JPN	Yoshitaka Komari
17	MF	THA	Weerapong Moolkamsan
18	GK	THA	Suriya Ahasime
19	FW	THA	Rattakit Chanana
20	GK	THA	Suriya Arhasimae
22	MF	THA	Jakkrit Reangsantere
25	MF	CMR	David Bayiha
27	MF	THA	Thitinan Ditcharoen
28	DF	THA	Pinichpong Jangploy
29	FW	JPN	Yuya Iwadate
30	DF	THA	Dusit Chumchairat
31	MF	THA	Anuwat Noichernphan
33	DF	JPN	Kato Yasuhiro
35	GK	JPN	Kochi Jun

== Results ==
=== Thai Premier League ===
Source: RSSSF

21 March 2010	Chonburi	3–0	Royal Thai Army	Chonburi
18:00 UTC+7	Ekaphan 15'; Arthit 58'; Therdsak 87'			Stadium: IPE Chonburi Stadium; Attendance: 8,124; Referee: Apisit Aonrak

28 March 2010	Royal Thai Army	2–2	Sisaket	Bangkok
				Stadium: Thai Army Sports Stadium; Referee: Sura Sriart

4 April 2010	TTM Phichit	3–1	Royal Thai Army	Phichit
				Stadium: Phichit Stadium

11 April 2010	Royal Thai Army	0–2	Pattaya United	Bangkok
				Stadium: Thai Army Sports Stadium; Referee: Preecha Kangram

18 April 2010	Bangkok Glass	3–1	Royal Thai Army	Thanyaburi
				Stadium: Leo Stadium; Referee: Thaweep Inkaew

24 April 2010	Royal Thai Army	1–1	Bangkok United	Bangkok
				Stadium: Thai Army Sports Stadium

1 May 2010	Osotspa Saraburi	0–1	Royal Thai Army	M-150 Saraburi Stadium, Saraburi
			Thittinan 15'	Referee: Chaiya Mahapab

9 May 2010	Buriram PEA	3–1	Royal Thai Army	Buriram
	Rangsan 2', 7'; Kaneung 58'; Dudu (red card) 90'		Jakkrapong 37' (pen.) (red card) 90'; Wittaya (red card) 71'	Stadium: i-mobile Stadium; Attendance: 12,784; Referee: Prathan Nasawang

23 May 2010	Police United	0–0	Royal Thai Army	Bangkok
				Stadium: Thammasat Rangsit Stadium; Referee: Apisit Aonrak

5 June 2010	Royal Thai Army	0–1	TOT-CAT	Bangkok
				Stadium: Thai Army Sports Stadium

13 June 2010	Samut Songkhram	4–2	Royal Thai Army	Samut Songkhram
				Stadium: Samut Songkhram Stadium

20 June 2010	Royal Thai Army	2–2	Muangthong United	Bangkok
				Stadium: Thai Army Sports Stadium

27 June 2010	Royal Thai Army	0–2	Thai Port	Bangkok
				Stadium: Thai Army Sports Stadium

4 July 2010	Rajnavy Rayong	2–1	Royal Thai Army	Rayong
				Stadium: Rayong Stadium

10 July 2010	Royal Thai Army	1–1	BEC Tero Sasana	Bangkok
				Stadium: Thai Army Sports Stadium

18 July 2010	Royal Thai Army	1–0	Chonburi	Bangkok
				Stadium: Thai Army Sports Stadium

24 July 2010	Sisaket	0–1	Royal Thai Army	Sisaket
				Stadium: Sri Nakhon Lamduan Stadium

30 July 2010	Royal Thai Army	3–2	TTM Phichit	Bangkok
				Stadium: Thai Army Sports Stadium

7 August 2010	Pattaya United	1–0	Royal Thai Army	Pattaya
				Stadium: Pattaya Stadium

15 August 2010	Royal Thai Army	1–3	Bangkok Glass	Bangkok
				Stadium: Thai Army Sports Stadium

18 August 2010	Bangkok United	0–1	Royal Thai Army	Bangkok
				Stadium: Thai-Japanese Stadium

21 August 2010	Royal Thai Army	0–1	Osotspa Saraburi	Bangkok
				Stadium: Thai Army Sports Stadium

12 September 2010	BEC Tero Sasana	2–1	Royal Thai Army	Bangkok
				Stadium: Thephasadin Stadium

19 September 2010	Royal Thai Army	1–2	Police United	Bangkok
				Stadium: Thai Army Sports Stadium

25 September 2010	TOT-CAT	0–0	Royal Thai Army	Nonthaburi
				Stadium: Yamaha Stadium

29 September 2010	Royal Thai Army	2–3	Samut Songkhram	Bangkok
				Stadium: Thai Army Sports Stadium

8 October 2010	Muangthong United	3–3	Royal Thai Army	Nonthaburi
19.00 UTC+7				Stadium: Yamaha Stadium (Thailand); Referee: Apisit Aonrak

13 October 2010	Royal Thai Army	0–2	Buriram PEA	Bangkok
				Stadium: Thai Army Sports Stadium

17 October 2010	Thai Port	5–0	Royal Thai Army	Bangkok
				Stadium: PAT Stadium

==== League table ====
Pos	Team	Pld	W	D	L	GF	GA	GD	Pts	Qualification or relegation
12	TOT-CAT	30	9	6	15	23	42	−19	33	
13	TTM Phichit	30	7	11	12	32	46	−14	32	
14	Sisaket	30	6	8	16	36	54	−18	26	Promotion/relegation play-off
15	Bangkok United (R)	30	5	9	16	25	52	−27	24	Promotion/relegation play-off
16	Royal Thai Army	30	5	7	18	27	54	−27	22	Promotion/relegation play-off

Updated to match(es) played on 24 October 2010. Source: FIFA.com
Rules for classification: 1st points; 2nd head-to-head; 3rd match win; 4th goal difference; 5th number of goals scored
(R) Relegated

=== FA Cup ===
==== Third round ====
23 June 2010	Suphanburi	1–2	Royal Thai Army	Suphanburi
				Stadium: Suphanburi Municipality Stadium

==== Fourth round ====
26 August 2010	Royal Thai Army	0–0 (1 – 0 a.e.t)	Buriram PEA	Bangkok
				Stadium: Thai Army Sports Stadium; Referee: Sura Sriart

==== Quarter-final ====
15 September 2010	Royal Thai Army	4–1	Nakhon Pathom	Bangkok
				Stadium: Thai Army Sports Stadium

=== League Cup ===
==== First round ====
===== 1st leg =====
28 August 2010	Sukhothai	0–1	Royal Thai Army	Sukhothai
				Stadium: Sukhothai Stadium

===== 2nd leg =====
1 September 2010	Royal Thai Army	6–1	Sukhothai	Bangkok
				Stadium: Thai Army Sports Stadium

==== Second round ====
===== 1st leg =====
22 September 2010	Nong Khai	1–1	Royal Thai Army	Nong Khai
				Stadium: Nong Khai Stadium

===== 2nd leg =====
6 October 2010	Royal Thai Army	2–3	Nong Khai	Bangkok
				Stadium: Thai Army Sports Stadium

=== Queen's Cup ===
6 February 2010	Osotspa Saraburi	1–1	Royal Thai Army	Saraburi
18:30 UTC+7	Wanmai 17'		Bayiha 39'	Stadium: Saraburi Central Stadium

8 February 2010	Royal Thai Army	2–0	Thai Port	Saraburi
16:00 UTC+7	?' ?'	(Report)		Stadium: Saraburi Central Stadium

10 February 2010	Samut Songkhram	2–2	Royal Thai Army	Saraburi
16:00 UTC+7	Tripob 56'; Sittipan 88'		Tanakorn 62', 85'	Stadium: Saraburi Central Stadium

14 February 2010	Krung Thai Bank-BG	1–0	Royal Thai Army	Saraburi
18:00 UTC+7	Rungroj 2'	Report		Stadium: Saraburi Central Stadium
