= 2011 Buriram F.C. season =

Season of football team

== Players ==
=== First team squad ===
As of February 16, 2011 Note: Flags indicate national team as defined under FIFA eligibility rules; some limited exceptions apply. Players may hold more than one non-FIFA nationality.

No.	Pos.	Nation	Player
1	GK	THA	Umarin Yaodam
2	DF	THA	Piyarat Lajungreed
3	MF	THA	Weerayut Jitkuntod
4	MF	THA	Thanusorn Ketmanee
5	MF	THA	Rattana Petch-Aporn
7	MF	THA	Sumanya Purisai
8	MF	THA	Kaneung Buransook
9	FW	THA	Suriya Domtaisong
10	MF	GHA	Kwadwo Boabah
11	FW	BRA	Douglas
12	MF	CMR	Chakrit Rawanprakone
13	GK	CMR	
14	MF	THA	Rattapon Piyawuttisakun

No.	Pos.	Nation	Player
16	MF	THA	
17	MF	CMR	Antonie Clement Bayema
18	FW	THA	Supakit Jinajai
18		THA	Songsak Chaisamak
19	FW	THA	Chutipol Thongthae
20	DF	CIV	Koné Seydou
21	GK	THA	Ukrit Wongmeema
23	MF	CMR	Bayema Clement Antonie
31	DF	THA	Durongrit Srila
25	FW	THA	Somjet Sattabud
26	DF	CIV	Henri Jöel
—	MF	THA	Ekkachai Sumrei
—	MF	THA	Jirawat Makarom

== League table ==
Pos	Team	Pld	W	D	L	GF	GA	GD	Pts	Promotion or relegation
1	Buriram	0	0	0	0	0	0	0	0	Promotion to 2012 Thai Premier League
2	Chainat (P)	34	21	3	10	68	42	+26	66	Promotion to 2012 Thai Premier League
3	BBCU (P)	34	18	9	7	39	25	+14	63	Promotion to 2012 Thai Premier League
4	PTT Rayong	34	17	8	9	54	28	+26	59	
5	Songkhla	34	15	11	8	54	39	+15	56	
6	Bangkok United	34	15	6	13	56	52	+4	51	
7	Gulf Saraburi	34	12	14	8	41	31	+10	50	
8	Raj Pracha F.C. Thailand	34	13	7	14	40	55	−15	46	
9	F.C. Phuket	34	11	12	11	45	47	−2	45	
10	Suphanburi	34	10	14	10	40	37	+3	44	
11	Bangkok F.C.	34	13	3	18	56	63	−7	42	
12	Cash Today Chanthaburi	34	11	8	15	39	48	−9	41	
13	J.W. Rangsit	34	10	10	14	31	42	−11	40	
14	Air Force United	34	10	10	14	36	53	−17	40	
15	Samut Prakan Customs United (R)	34	10	6	18	41	55	−14	36	Relegation to the 2012 Regional League Division 2
16	Chiangmai (R)	34	7	9	18	36	55	−19	30	Relegation to the 2012 Regional League Division 2
17	RBAC (R)	34	5	10	19	25	61	−36	25	Relegation to the 2012 Regional League Division 2
18	Thai Honda (R)	34	6	6	22	33	69	−36	24	Relegation to the 2012 Regional League Division 2

Updated to match(es) played on January 26, 2012. Source: Thai Premier League
Rules for classification: 1st points; 2nd head-to-head (only match result, not used aggregate); 3rd match win; 4th goal difference; 5th goals scored.
(P) Promoted; (R) Relegated

== Competitions ==
Win Draw Loss

=== FA Cup ===
22 June 2011 R2	Air Force United	0 – 2	Buriram	Thupatemee Stadium
18:00

17 August 2011 R3	Army United	2 – 1	Buriram	Thupatemee Stadium
18:00

=== League Cup ===
2 July 2011 R1	Buriram	2 – 1	Chainat	i-mobile Stadium
18:00

17 August 2011 R2	Buriram PEA	1 – 1(5-3)	Buriram	Thunder Castle Stadium
18:00
