= 2010 Queen's Cup =

Tournament details
- Dates: 6 February - 18 February
- Teams: 16
- Venues: 4 (in 4 host cities)

Final positions
- Champions: (Thailand) Krung Thai Bank-BG (1st title)
- Runners-up: (Thailand) Police United

The 2010 Queen's Cup was the 34th edition of a Thai domestic football cup competition.

It was an invitational competition, and it was jointly hosted by Chonburi football club and the Football Association of Thailand.

Unlike the Thai Premier League, clubs didn't have to be public limited companies, so former football clubs in the Thai football league system could enter.

The champions received 300,000 baht while the runners-up got 150,000 baht.

The draw was made on 26 January 2010.

== Group stages ==
=== Group A ===
Team	Pld	W	D	L	GF	GA	GD	Pts
BEC Tero Sasana	3	3	0	0	9	3	+6	9
Pattaya United	3	2	0	1	5	3	+2	6
Air Force United	3	1	0	2	5	6	−1	3
Raj Pracha-Nonthaburi	3	0	0	3	3	10	−7	0

6 February 2010
16:00 UTC+7

BEC Tero Sasana	4 – 0	Raj Pracha-Nonthaburi
Anon S. 52'; Narej 60'; Hubert 76' (pen.); Noppol 87'	Report

Nongprue Municipality Stadium, Chonburi

6 February 2010
18:30 UTC+7

Air Force United	0 – 1	Pattaya United
	Report	Ludovick 81'

Nongprue Municipality Stadium, Chonburi

8 February 2010
16:00 UTC+7

Air Force United	1 – 2	BEC Tero Sasana
Prasart 75'	Report	Anon S. 45'; Prompong 70'

Nongprue Municipality Stadium, Chonburi

8 February 2010
18:30 UTC+7

Raj Pracha-Nonthaburi	0 – 2	Pattaya United
	Report	Patiphon 34'; Tana 71'

Nongprue Municipality Stadium, Chonburi

10 February 2010
16:00 UTC+7

Raj Pracha-Nonthaburi	3 – 4	Air Force United
Rewat 8', 36'; Narakorn 84'	Report	Anuwat 4'; Prasart 59'; Watcharapong 65', 80'

Nongprue Municipality Stadium, Chonburi

10 February 2010
18:30 UTC+7

Pattaya United	2 – 3	BEC Tero Sasana
Ludovick 72', 89'	Report	Christian 35'; Narej 60'; Anon B. 83'

Nongprue Municipality Stadium, Chonburi

=== Group B ===
Team	Pld	W	D	L	GF	GA	GD	Pts
Rajnavy Rayong	3	1	1	1	5	4	+1	4
Police United	3	1	1	1	3	2	+1	4
TOT	3	1	1	1	1	1	0	4
Hakka-Sriracha	3	1	1	1	2	3	−1	4

7 February 2010
16:00 UTC+7

TOT	0 – 0	Hakka-Sriracha
	Report

Rayong Stadium, Rayong

7 February 2010
18:30 UTC+7

Police United	2 – 2	Rajnavy Rayong
Ek-arthit 47'; Nantawat 48'	Report	Suttinan 71'; Tinnapob 88'

Rayong Stadium, Rayong
Referee: Atthakorn Wetchakan

9 February 2010
16:00 UTC+7

Police United	1 – 0	TOT
Surapong 38'	Report

Rayong Stadium, Rayong

9 February 2010
18:30 UTC+7

Hakka-Sriracha	1 – 3	Rajnavy Rayong
Sanou 9'	Report	Somjet 23'; Alex 44'; Suttinan 87' (pen.)

Rayong Stadium, Rayong
Referee: Atthakorn Wetchakan

11 February 2010
16:00 UTC+7

Hakka-Sriracha	1 – 0	Police United
Beckenbauer 44'	Report

Rayong Stadium, Rayong

11 February 2010
18:30 UTC+7

Rajnavy Rayong	0 – 1	TOT
	Report	Miloslav 56'

Rayong Stadium, Rayong

=== Group C ===
Team	Pld	W	D	L	GF	GA	GD	Pts
Samut Songkhram	3	1	2	0	8	6	+2	5
Royal Thai Army	3	1	2	0	5	3	+2	5
Thai Port	3	1	1	1	7	7	0	4
Osotspa Saraburi	3	0	1	2	2	6	−4	1

6 February 2010
16:00 UTC+7

Thai Port	4 – 4	Samut Songkhram
Jakkrit 34'; Sarayoot 39', 47', 67' (pen.)	Report	Jirawat 5'; Apinan 17'; Bireme Dioue 45'; Sittipan 83'

Saraburi Central Stadium, Saraburi

6 February 2010
18:30 UTC+7

Royal Thai Army	1 – 1	Osotspa Saraburi
Bayiha 39'	Report	Wanmai 17'

Saraburi Central Stadium, Saraburi

8 February 2010
16:00 UTC+7

Royal Thai Army	2 – 0	Thai Port
Jakkrapong 87', 90+1'	Report

Saraburi Central Stadium, Saraburi

8 February 2010
18:30 UTC+7

Samut Songkhram	2 – 0	Osotspa Saraburi
Pichet 36'; Michel 90+3'	Report

Saraburi Central Stadium, Saraburi

10 February 2010
16:00 UTC+7

Samut Songkhram	2 – 2	Royal Thai Army
Tripob 56'; Sittipan 88'	Report	Tanakorn 62', 85'

Saraburi Central Stadium, Saraburi

10 February 2010
18:30 UTC+7

Osotspa Saraburi	1 – 3	Thai Port
Suradetch 14'	Report	Songsak 10', 30'; Edvaldo 53'

Saraburi Central Stadium, Saraburi
Referee: Chaireag Ngmsom

=== Group D ===
Team	Pld	W	D	L	GF	GA	GD	Pts
Krung Thai Bank-BG	3	3	0	0	14	1	+13	9
Chonburi	3	2	0	1	7	4	+3	6
Sinthana	3	1	0	2	4	11	−7	3
Raj-Vithi	3	0	0	3	0	9	−9	0

7 February 2010
16:00 UTC+7

Krung Thai Bank-BG	7 – 1	Sinthana
Saruta 22', 30'; Tanat 26'; Chatree 40'; Sutee 45', 76'; Ekollo 68'	Report	Chakrit 66'

Sirindhorn Stadium, Chonburi

7 February 2010
18:30 UTC+7

Raj-Vithi	0 – 3	Chonburi
	Report	Therdsak 14' (pen.); Bénié 85'; Ekaphan 90+4'

Sirindhorn Stadium, Chonburi

9 February 2010
16:00 UTC+7

Raj-Vithi	0 – 4	Krung Thai Bank-BG
	Report	Chatree 35'; Tanat 67'; Ajayi 85'; Supachai 88'

Sirindhorn Stadium, Chonburi

9 February 2010
18:30 UTC+7

Sinthana	1 – 4	Chonburi
Rattasart 53'	Report	Ekaphan 38', 73'; Bénié 82'; Rangsan 88'

Sirindhorn Stadium, Chonburi

11 February 2010
16:00 UTC+7

Sinthana	2 – 0	Raj-Vithi
Anucha 9'; Pongsakorn 83'	Report

Sirindhorn Stadium, Chonburi

11 February 2010
18:30 UTC+7

Chonburi	0 – 3	Krung Thai Bank-BG
	Report	Chatree 81'; Sutee 82'; Ajayi 90'

Sirindhorn Stadium, Chonburi

== Knockout stages ==
=== Quarter-finals ===
13 February 2010
18:00 UTC+7

BEC Tero Sasana	0 – 1	Police United
	Report	Assaming 61'

Nongprue Municipality Stadium, Chonburi

13 February 2010
18:00 UTC+7

Rajnavy Rayong	2 – 2 (a.e.t.)	Pattaya United
Suttinan 46', 56'	Report	Patiphon 25'; Ludovick 50'
Penalties
	10 – 9

Rayong Stadium, Rayong

14 February 2010
18:00 UTC+7

Samut Songkhram	0 – 2	Chonburi
	Report	Rangsan 66', 86'

Sirindhorn Stadium, Chonburi

14 February 2010
18:00 UTC+7

Krung Thai Bank-BG	1 – 0	Royal Thai Army
Rungroj 2'	Report

Thai Army Sports Stadium, Bangkok

=== Semi-finals ===
16 February 2010
17:00 UTC+7

Police United	1 – 0	Chonburi
Nantawat 8'	Report

IPE Chonburi Stadium, Chonburi

16 February 2010
19:30 UTC+7

Rajnavy Rayong	1 – 2	Krung Thai Bank-BG
Wuttichai 56'	Report	Ney Fabiano 31'; Supachai 90+1'

IPE Chonburi Stadium, Chonburi

=== Final ===
18 February 2010
18:00 UTC+7

Police United	1 – 4	Krung Thai Bank-BG
Tanapat 62'	Report	Paul 48'; Anawin 53', 69'; Ajayi 75'

IPE Chonburi Stadium, Chonburi
Referee: Prathan Nasawang
