= Itthipol Nonsiri =

Thai footballer (born 1980)

Personal information
- Full name: Itthipol Nonsiri
- Date of birth: April 15, 1979 (age 47)
- Place of birth: Ubon Ratchathani, Thailand
- Height: 1.74 m (5 ft 8 1/2 in)
- Position: Defender

Youth career
- 1998–1999: Port Authority of Thailand

Senior career*
Years	Team	Apps	(Gls)
2000–2012	Thai Port	118	(1)
2012–2014	Yasothon	29	(0)

Managerial career
- 2019: Port B
- 2021–2022: Trang
- 2022: Kasetsart (interim)
- 2023: STK Muangnont
- 2023–: Marines
- * Club domestic league appearances and goals

Itthipol Nonsiri (Thai: อิทธิพล นนท์ศิริ; born 15 April 1980) is a former Thai footballer. He was played for Thai Port FC and he was named club captain for the 2009 season.

He came on as a substitute in the 2010 Thai League Cup final and won a winner's medal after Thai Port defeated Buriram PEA F.C. 2–1.
