= Rungsak Kothcharak =

Thai footballer (born 1993)

Personal information
- Full name: Rungsak Kothcharak
- Date of birth: 24 November 1993 (age 32)
- Place of birth: Thailand
- Position: Left-back

Team information
- Current team: Trat
- Number: 30

Senior career*
Years	Team	Apps	(Gls)
2015–2017	Army United	7	(0)
2018	Royal Thai Army		
2019–	Trat		
- * Club domestic league appearances and goals

Rungsak Kothcharak (born 24 November 1993), is a Thai professional footballer who plays as a left-back for Thai League 1 club Trat.
