= Kiatjarern Ruangparn =

Thai footballer (born 1987)

Personal information
- Full name: Kiatjarern Ruangparn
- Date of birth: 9 April 1982 (age 44)
- Place of birth: Udon Thani, Thailand
- Height: 1.68 m (5 ft 6 in)
- Position: Midfielder

Senior career*
Years	Team	Apps	(Gls)
2005–2016	Port	104	(10)
2016–2017	Air Force Central	19	(0)
- * Club domestic league appearances and goals as of 14 November 2008

Kiatjarern Ruangparn (Thai: เกียรติเจริญ เรืองปาน; born 9 April 1987) is a retired professional footballer from Thailand. He played in the 2010 Thai League Cup final and won a winner's medal after Thai Port defeated Buriram PEA F.C. 2-1.

== Honours ==
=== Club ===
Thai Port F.C.

- Thai FA Cup winner (1) : 2009
- Thai League Cup winner (1) : 2010
