= 2010 Thai League Cup =

Tournament details
- Country: Thailand
- Dates: 4 August 2010 – 21 November 2010
- Teams: 89

Final positions
- Champions: Thai Port (1st title)
- Runners-up: Buriram PEA

Tournament statistics
- Top goal scorer(s): Cleiton Silva (9 goals)

Awards
- Best player: Sarayuth Chaikamdee

The 2010 Thai League Cup kicked off on 4 August 2010 with the Bangkok & field regional qualifiers. The Thai League Cup was readmitted back into Thai football after a 10-year absence. This edition was sponsored by Toyota thus naming it Toyota League Cup. The prize money for this prestigious award is said to be around 5 million baht and the runners-up will be netting 1 million baht.

The prize money was not the only benefit of this cup, the team winning the fair play spot wins a Hilux Vigo. The MVP of the competition got a Toyota Camry Hybrid Car. The winner of the cup earned the right to participate on a cup competition in Japan.

This was the first edition of the competition and the qualifying round was played in regions featuring clubs from the Regional League Division 2.

== Calendar ==
Round	Date	Matches	Clubs	New entries this round
Qualifying Round	4 August 2010; 11 August 2010; 18 August 2010	25	50 → 25	50
First Round	28 August 2010; 29 August 2010; 31 August 2010; 1 September 2010; 2 September 2010	32 + 32	25 + 39 → 32	39
Second Round	7 September 2010; 8 September 2010; 14 September 2010; 15 September 2010; 22 September 2010; 4 October 2010; 6 October 2010; 13 October 2010; 20 October 2010	16 + 16	32 → 16	
Third Round	20 October 2010	8 + 8	16 → 8	
Quarter-finals		4 + 4	8 → 4	
Semi-finals		2 + 2	4 → 2	
Final	21 November 2010	1	2 → Champions	

== Qualifying round ==
Team 1	Score	Team 2
4 August 2010
Rose Asia United Thanyaburi	0–1	Nakhon Sawan Rajabhat University
Thai Summit Samut Prakan	2–2 (4–6)	University of North Bangkok
Rangsit University	1–2	Thai Air Look Isan
Kasetsart University	0–2 ^{1}	Nonthaburi
Raj-Vithi	(w/o) ^{2}	Bangkok
Bangkok North Central ASSN	0–2	Kasem Bundit University
11 August 2010
Samut Prakan	8–7	Muangkan
Rayong	4–2	Sa Kaeo United
Nakhon Nayok	1–0	Kabinburi
Ang Thong	4–1	Prachinburi United
Nakhon Ratchasima	3–1	Loei City
Nong Khai	6–2	Surin
Chaiyaphum United	3–1	Mahasarakham City
Roi Et United	3–0	Ubon Tiger
Ratchaburi	2–0	Samut Sakhon
Singburi	3–2	Chiangrai
Phetchaburi	2–1	Pathum Thani
18 August 2010
Phattalung	0–0 (5–6)	Hat Yai
Mukdahan	0–0 (2–5)	Sakon Nakhon
Nakhon Si Thammarat	1–2	Trang
Phitsanulok	3–0	Uttaradit
Phrae United	1–0	Kamphaeng Phet
Tak	1–0	Phayao
Phichit	2–3	Sukhothai
Phang Nga	(w/o) ^{3}	Chumphon

^{1} Nonthaburi won 2-0 because Kasetsart University walked off the pitch during the middle of the game.
^{2} Raj-Vithi withdrew.
^{3}Chumphon withdrew.

== First round ==
Team 1	Agg.	Team 2	1st leg	2nd leg
Kalasin	0–11	Buriram PEA	0–1	0–10
Uthai Thani Forest	3–4	Pattaya United	2–3	1–1
Sukhothai	1–7	Royal Thai Army	0–1	1–6
Ang Thong	2–3	TTM Phichit	1–0	1–3
Nakon Ratchasima	0–8	Samut Songkhram	0–1	0–7
Nakhon Sawan Rajabhat University	0–2	Police United	0–1	0–1
Kasem Bundit University	1–6	TOT-CAT	0–4	1–2
Phetchaburi	1–1	Rajnavy Rayong	1–1	0–0
Sakon Nakhon	4–4	Narathiwat	4–1	0–3
Phang Nga	0–2	Nakhon Pathom	0–1	0–1
Nong Khai	5–4	Suphanburi	4–2	1–2
Chaiyaphum United	1–3	PTT Rayong	1–3	0–0
Ratchaburi	2–4	Chiangrai United	1–1	1–3
Nakhon Nayok	0–2	RBAC Mittraphap	0–0	0–2
Phrae United	1–4	Prachinburi	1–4	0–0
Yala	0–6	Chula United	0–2	0–4
Nonthaburi	0–6	Bangkok Glass	0–2	0–4
Samut Prakan	2–3	Muangthong United	1–2	1–1
Bangkok	3–4	Thai Port	0–3	3–1
Phuket	2–5	Osotspa Saraburi	1–2	1–3
Hat Yai	0–10	Bangkok United	0–3	0–7
Tak	0–5	Sisaket	0–2	0–3
Phitsanulok	1–5	Chonburi	0–2	1–3
Rayong	1–4	BEC Tero Sasana	0–1	1–3
Trang	0–2	Thai Honda	0–1	0–1
University of North Bangkok	1–2	Air Force United	0–0	1–2
Singburi	1–4	Chanthaburi	0–2	1–2
Phetchabun	1–3	Suvarnabhumi Customs	0–1	1–2
Chachoengsao	2–3	Khonkaen	1–1	1–2
Thai Air Look Isan	2–5	Sriracha	1–3	1–2
Roi Et United	2–1	Raj Pracha-Nonthaburi	0–0	2–1
Nakhon Phanom	(w/o) ^{1}	Songkhla	2–0	–

^{1} Songkhla withdrew after the first leg.

== Second round ==
Team 1	Agg.	Team 2	1st leg	2nd leg
Chanthaburi	1–2	TOT-CAT	1–2	0–0
Roi Et United	1–2	Thai Port	1–0	0–2
Air Force United	3–4	Muangthong United	2–0	1–4
Thai Honda	2–2	Suvarnabhumi Customs	1–0	1–2
Nakhon Pathom	3–6	Rajnavy Rayong	2–3	1–3
PTT Rayong	2–2	Prachinburi	1–0	1–2
Chula United	3–4	Samut Songkhram	0–2	3–2
Chiangrai United	1–2	Pattaya United	1–1	0–1
Sriracha	3–3	BEC Tero Sasana	0–0	3–3
Police United	4–8	Osotspa Saraburi	1–1	3–7
RBAC Mittraphap	3–2	Khonkaen	2–1	1–1
Narathiwat	2–9	Bangkok United	0–4	2–5
Nakhon Phanom	5–10	Sisaket	2–2	3–8
Buriram PEA	2–0	TTM Phichit	2–0	0–0
Nong Khai	4–3	Royal Thai Army	1–1	3–2
Chonburi	0–3	Bangkok Glass	0–2	0–1

== Third round ==
Team 1	Agg.	Team 2	1st leg	2nd leg
TOT-CAT	0–7	Buriram PEA	0–0	0–7
Sisaket	3–0	Muangthong United	1–0	2–0
PTT Rayong	2–5	Osotspa Saraburi	1–0	1–5
Thai Honda	1–5	Pattaya United	1–4	0–1
Sriracha	2–8	Rajnavy Rayong	0–3	2–5
Nong Khai	2–8	Bangkok Glass	2–5	0–3
RBAC Mittraphap	1–2	Bangkok United	1–1	0–1
Samut Songkhram	1–2	Thai Port	0–0	1–2

== Quarter-final ==
Team 1	Agg.	Team 2	1st leg	2nd leg
Sisaket	2–7	Buriram PEA	2–4	0–3
Osotspa Saraburi	6–1	Pattaya United	4–1	2–0
Rajnavy Rayong	2–2	Bangkok Glass	0–0	2–2
Bangkok United	3–3	Thai Port	2–2	1–1

== Semi-final ==
Team 1	Agg.	Team 2	1st leg	2nd leg
Osotspa Saraburi	3–8	Buriram PEA	2–6	1–2
Rajnavy Rayong	4–5 (a.e.t.)	Thai Port	3–1	1–4

== Final ==
Team 1	Score	Team 2
21 November 2010
Thai Port	2–1	Buriram PEA
