= Nitipong Saiyasit =

Thai footballer (born 1980)

Personal information
- Full name: Nitipong Saiyasit
- Date of birth: January 28, 1980 (age 46)
- Place of birth: Phitsanulok, Thailand
- Height: 1.74 m (5 ft 8 1/2 in)
- Position: Defender

Team information
- Current team: Samut Songkhram

Senior career*
Years	Team	Apps	(Gls)
2007–2008	Bangkok Bank		
2009–present	Samut Songkhram		
- * Club domestic league appearances and goals as of 22 June 2008

Nitipong Saiyasit (Thai นิติพงษ์ ไสยสิทธิ์ ) is a Thai footballer. He plays for Thailand Premier League clubside Samut Songkhram FC.
