= Theerachai Ngamcharoen =

Thai footballer (born 1983)

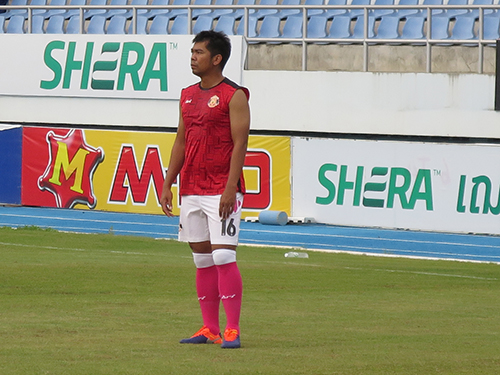

Personal information
- Full name: Theerachai Ngamcharoen
- Date of birth: 5 July 1983 (age 43)
- Place of birth: Sisaket, Thailand
- Height: 1.74 m (5 ft 8 1/2 in)
- Positions: Left back; left winger

Senior career*
Years	Team	Apps	(Gls)
2008–2010	TOT-CAT	58	(2)
2011–2013	Sisaket	27	(1)
2013	→ Muangthong United (loan)	1	(0)
2014	Chainat Hornbill	18	(0)
2015–2017	Sisaket	51	(0)
Total		155	(3)
- * Club domestic league appearances and goals as of 01:44, 24 November 2017 (UTC)

Theerachai Ngamcharoen (Thai: ธีรชัย งามเจริญ, born July 5, 1983) is a Thai former professional footballer who played as a left back.

== Match fixing scandal and ban ==
On February 21, 2017, Theerachai was accused of match-fixing in several league games. He was arrested by Royal Thai Police and banned from football for life.
