= Kittipat Wongsombat =

Thai footballer (born 1990)

Personal information
- Full name: Kittipat Wongsombat
- Date of birth: 18 October 1990 (age 36)
- Place of birth: Thailand
- Height: 1.71 m (5 ft 7 1/2 in)
- Position: Right midfielder

Team information
- Current team: North Bangkok University
- Number: 80

Senior career*
Years	Team	Apps	(Gls)
2014	Thai Honda		
2016	Udon Thani	24	(0)
2017	Lampang		
2018–2019	Nakhon Ratchasima	6	(1)
2019–2023	Chiangmai United	71	(2)
2023–	North Bangkok University	27	(0)
- * Club domestic league appearances and goals as of 7 April 2024

Kittipat Wongsombat (Thai: กิตติภัทร วงศ์สมบัติ) is a Thai professional footballer who plays as a right midfielder.
