= Kittipol Paphunga =

Thai footballer (born 1983)

Personal information
- Full name: Kittipol Paphunga
- Date of birth: 2 November 1983 (age 42)
- Place of birth: Roi Et, Thailand
- Height: 1.67 m (5 ft 5 1/2 in)
- Position: Attacking midfielder

Youth career
- 2002–2004: Chula United

Senior career*
Years	Team	Apps	(Gls)
2005–2008	Chula United	56	(9)
2009–2010	BEC Tero Sasana	34	(7)
2010–2012	Muangthong United	0	(0)
2011	→ Suphanburi (loan)	6	(0)
2013	Bangkok United	4	(0)
2014	Air Force Central	0	(0)
2014	Chiangmai	19	(2)
2015	Ubon UMT United	16	(1)
Total		135	(19)
- * Club domestic league appearances and goals as of 22 June 2008

Kittipol Paphunga (Thai: กิตติพล ปาภูงา, born November 2, 1983) is a former professional footballer from Thailand. He is the brother of Kittipoom Paphunga.

== Honours ==
=== Club ===
Muangthong United

- Thai Premier League Champions (2) : 2010, 2012
