= Kittipoom Paphunga =

Thai footballer

Personal information
- Full name: Kittipoom Paphunga
- Date of birth: 25 December 1986 (age 39)
- Place of birth: Roi Et, Thailand
- Height: 1.68 m (5 ft 6 in)
- Positions: Striker; attacking midfielder

Youth career
- 2004–2006: Chula United

Senior career*
Years	Team	Apps	(Gls)
2006–2009	Chula United		
2010	BEC Tero Sasana		
2011–2012	Nakhon Ratchasima		
2013	Ayutthaya		
2013–2014	Air Force Central		
2014–2015	Thai Honda		
- * Club domestic league appearances and goals as of 22 June 2008

Kittipoom Paphunga (Thai: กิตติภูมิ ปาภูงา, born December 25, 1986) is a former professional footballer from Thailand.

== Personal life ==
Kittipoom's brother Kittipol Paphunga is also a footballer.

== Match fixing scandal and ban ==
On February 21, 2017 Kittipoom was accused of match-fixing on several league games. He was arrested by Royal Thai Police and banned from football for life.

== Honours ==
=== Club ===
Chula United

- Regional League Division 2 Champions (1) : 2006

Air Force Central

- Thai Division 1 League Champions (1) : 2013
