= Kunlaphon Yantrasri =

Thai footballer (born 1977)

Personal information
- Full name: Naruecha Yantrasri
- Date of birth: 27 January 1977 (age 49)
- Place of birth: Bangkok, Thailand
- Height: 1.72 m (5 ft 7 1/2 in)
- Position: Defensive midfielder

Senior career*
| Years | Team | Apps | (Gls) |
| 2001–2006 | BEC Tero Sasana | | |
| 2007–2010 | TTM Samut Sakhon | | |
| 2010–2011 | TOT | | |
| 2012 | Rajpracha | | |
| 2012 | Phang Nga | | |
| 2013 | Assumption United | | |
| 2014 | Lampang | | |
- * Club domestic league appearances and goals as of 14 November 2008

Kunlaphon Yantrasri or formerly Sakchai Yantrasri. is a retired professional footballer from Thailand.
