= Rattana Petch-Aporn =

Thai footballer (born 1982)

Personal information
- Full name: Rattana Petch-Aporn
- Date of birth: 15 July 1982 (age 44)
- Place of birth: Bangkok, Thailand
- Height: 1.69 m (5 ft 6 1/2 in)
- Position: Defensive midfielder

Senior career*
Years	Team	Apps	(Gls)
2004–2008	Army United	38	(7)
2009	TOT	16	(2)
2010	Buriram United	2	(0)
2011	Buriram	25	(5)
2012–2015	Ratchaburi Mitr Phol	109	(7)
2016	Suphanburi	7	(0)
2017	Samut Sakhon	16	(1)
2017	Air Force Central	12	(1)
2018–2019	MOF Customs United	31	(2)

International career
2012	Thailand	3	(1)
- * Club domestic league appearances and goals as of November 17, 2012

Rattana Petch-Aporn (Thai: รัตนะ เพ็ชรอาภรณ์, born July 15, 1982), simply known as Na (Thai: นะ), is a Thai retired professional footballer who played as a defensive midfielder. He was also a member of the Thailand national team.

== International career ==
In September, 2012 Rattana was called up in a friendly match against Laos

=== International ===
As of 12 November 2015

National team	Year	Apps	Goals
Thailand	2012	3	1
Thailand	Total	3	1

== International goals ==
#	Date	Venue	Opponent	Score	Result	Competition
1.	14 November 2012	Thai-Japanese Stadium, Thailand	Bhutan	5–0	5–0	International Friendly

== Honours ==
Buriram

- Thai Division 1 League: 2011

Ratchaburi

- Thai Division 1 League: 2012
