= Narej Karpkraikaew =

Thai footballer

Personal information
- Full name: Narej Karpkraikaew
- Date of birth: 1 September 1983 (age 43)
- Place of birth: Khon Kaen, Thailand
- Height: 1.70 m (5 ft 7 in)
- Position: Striker

Senior career*
Years	Team	Apps	(Gls)
2009–2010	BEC Tero Sasana	16	(2)
2011–2014	PTT Rayong	14	(1)
2015–2016	Trat	22	(4)
2016–2017	Phuket	19	(2)
2017	Songkhla United	14	(1)
- * Club domestic league appearances and goals as of 23 June 2008

Narej Karpkraikaew (Thai: นะเรศ กาพย์ไกรแก้ว, born September 1, 1983) is a retired professional footballer from Thailand.
