= Anton Kubala =

Slovak Footballer (born 1981)

Personal information
- Full name: Anton Kubala
- Date of birth: 4 December 1981 (age 44)
- Place of birth: Levice, Czechoslovakia
- Height: 1.86 m (6 ft 1 in)
- Position: Midfielder

Youth career
- Slovan Levice

Senior career*
Years	Team	Apps	(Gls)
1998–2000	Slovan Levice	41	(3)
2000–2001	AS Trenčín	6	(0)
2001–2003	Slovan Levice	34	(4)
2004	PKNS	26	(3)
2006–2007	Eldus Močenok	28	(4)
2007–2009	Dunajská Streda	25	(6)
2010	TOT-CAT	28	(2)

International career
1996–1999	Slovakia U15 - Slovakia U18	45	(4)
- * Club domestic league appearances and goals as of 19 November 2012

Anton Kubala (born 4 December 1981) is a Slovak Footballer.

Kubala was a member of the Slovakia youth teams, appearing for the Slovakia national U15, U16, U17, U18.
