= Panuwat Failai =

Thai footballer (born 1986)

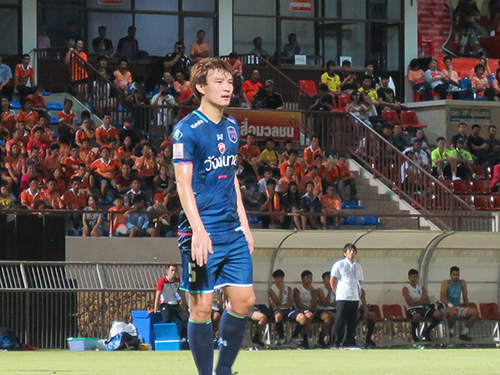

Personal information
- Full name: Panuwat Failai
- Date of birth: 15 March 1986 (age 40)
- Place of birth: Udon Thani, Thailand
- Height: 1.80 m (5 ft 11 in)
- Position: Defender

Team information
- Current team: Trat
- Number: 5

Senior career*
Years	Team	Apps	(Gls)
2007–2008	Customs Department	46	(4)
2009	TTM Samut Sakhon	25	(2)
2010–2013	Bangkok Glass	14	(0)
2013	Osotspa Saraburi	25	(0)
2014–2016	Chainat Hornbill	54	(1)
2017–2018	Navy	51	(0)
2019–2021	Sisaket	57	(3)
2021–	Trat	50	(2)

International career
2013	Thailand	2	(0)
- * Club domestic league appearances and goals as of 30 April 2023

Panuwat Failai (Thai: ภานุวัฒน์ ไฟไหล, born March 15, 1986), simply known as Top (Thai: ท็อป), is a Thai professional footballer who plays as a defender for Thai League 2 club Trat.

== International career ==
In 2013 Panuwat was called up to the national team by Surachai Jaturapattarapong to the 2015 AFC Asian Cup qualification.

=== International ===
As of 12 November 2015

National team	Year	Apps	Goals
Thailand	2013	2	0
Thailand	Total	2	0

== Honours ==
Customs Department

- Thai Division 1 League: 2007
