= Kritsakorn Kerdpol =

Thai footballer (born 1985)

Personal information
- Full name: Kritsakorn Kerdpol
- Date of birth: 21 January 1985 (age 41)
- Place of birth: Phetchaburi, Thailand
- Height: 1.82 m (5 ft 11 1/2 in)
- Position: Goalkeeper

Youth career
- 2005–2006: BBCU

Senior career*
Years	Team	Apps	(Gls)
2007	BBCU	19	(0)
2008	PEA	5	(0)
2009	TTM Phichit	29	(0)
2010–2012	Bangkok Glass	37	(0)
2013–2015	Chainat Hornbill	63	(0)
2015	→ Air Force Central (loan)	19	(0)
2016	Prachuap	16	(0)
2017	Navy	0	(0)
2017	Sukhothai	0	(0)
2018	Air Force Central	10	(0)
Total		198	(0)

Managerial career
- 2023: Samut Prakan City
- * Club domestic league appearances and goals as of 11 October 2008

Kritsakorn Kerdpol (Thai: กฤษกร เกิดผล, born January 21, 1985) is a retired professional footballer from Thailand.

== Honours ==
=== Club ===
PEA F.C.

- Thai Premier League Champions (1) : 2008
