= Pavarit Saensook =

Thai footballer (born 1987)

Personal information
- Full name: Pavarit Saensook
- Date of birth: 8 May 1987 (age 39)
- Place of birth: Bangkok, Thailand
- Height: 1.70 m (5 ft 7 in)
- Position: Left back

Youth career
- 2005: Chula United

Senior career*
Years	Team	Apps	(Gls)
2006–2008	Chula United	36	(4)
2009–2010	TTM Phichit	12	(2)
2010–2013	TOT	26	(3)
2014	Air Force Central	14	(1)
2015–2017	BBCU	41	(3)
2017	Angthong	16	(0)
Total		145	(13)
- * Club domestic league appearances and goals as of 21 February 2012

Pavarit Saensook (Thai: ปวริศย์ แสนสุข, born May 8, 1987), is a Thai retired professional footballer who played as a left back.

== Personal life ==
Pavarit has a brother Pakasit Saensook is also a footballer as a defender.

== Honours ==
=== Clubs ===
Chula United

- Regional League Division 2: 2006
