= Sittipan Chumchuay =

Thai footballer (born 1988)

Personal information
- Full name: Sittipan Chumchuay
- Date of birth: April 25, 1988 (age 38)
- Place of birth: Bangkok, Thailand
- Height: 1.71 m (5 ft 7 1/2 in)
- Position: Striker

Youth career
- Samut Songkhram

Senior career*
Years	Team	Apps	(Gls)
2009–2010	Samut Songkhram	32	(8)
2011	Chanthaburi		
2011	TTM Phichit		
2012	Samut Songkhram	15	(1)
2012–2013	Esan United		
2014	Ang Thong		
2014	Bangkok Glass	2	(0)
2015	Air Force Central		
2016	Samut Sakhon		
- * Club domestic league appearances and goals as of 22 April 2010

Sittipan Chumchuay (Thai: สิทธิพันธ์ ชุมช่วย, born April 25, 1988) is a former professional footballer from Thailand.
