= Kraisorn Sriyan =

Thai footballer (born 1983)

Personal information
- Full name: Kraisorn Sriyan
- Date of birth: 16 November 1983 (age 42)
- Place of birth: Sisaket, Thailand
- Height: 1.68 m (5 ft 6 in)
- Position: Striker

Senior career*
Years	Team	Apps	(Gls)
2007–2010	Buriram PEA	2	(0)
2011	→ TTM Phichit (loan)	8	(1)
2012	Army United	19	(3)
2013	BBCU	2	(0)
2014	PTT Rayong	2	(0)
2015	Krabi	13	(1)
2016–2017	Royal Thai Army	39	(14)
2018–2019	MOF Customs United		
- * Club domestic league appearances and goals

Kraisorn Sriyan (Thai: ไกรสรณ์ ศรียันต์, born November 16, 1983) is a Thai retired professional footballer who plays as a striker.

== Honours ==
=== Club ===
Buriram PEA

- Thai Premier League (1): 2008
