= Apisit Aonrak =

Thai football referee

- Born: 16 March 1976 (age 50); Samut Prakran, Thailand

Domestic
Years	League	Role
2000–2012	Thai Premier League	Referee

International
Years	League	Role
2009–2012	FIFA listed	Referee

Apisit Aonrak (Thai: อภิสิทธิ์ อ้นรักษ์, born March 16, 1976) is a Thai former football referee who has been a full international referee for FIFA.

He was also a 4th official at the 2010 AFC Champions League.

He was preselected as a 4th official for the 2010 AFF Suzuki Cup.

On November 21, 2010, Aonrak will be the referee for the Final match of the 2010 Toyota League Cup, Buriram PEA vs. Thai Port at the National Stadium in Bangkok.

On December 19, 2010, Aonrak will be the 4th official for the Semi-Final match of the 2010 AFF Suzuki Cup, Indonesia vs. Philippines at the Bung Karno Stadium in Central Jakarta.

He served as a referee for 2014 World Cup qualifying, officiating the opening-round match between Bangladesh and Lebanon.
