= Chaiya Mahapab =

Thai former football referee (born 1976)

- Full name: Chaiya Alee Mahapab
- Born: 21 September 1976 (age 50); Ayutthaya, Thailand

Domestic
Years	League	Role
1998–2016	Thai Premier League	Referee
2013	CSL	Referee
2013	Chinese FA Cup	Referee

International
Years	League	Role
2007–2014	FIFA listed	Referee

Chaiya Alee Mahapab (Thai: ชัยยะ มหาปราบ, born 21 September 1976) is a Thai former football referee. He referees in the Thai Premier League, Chinese Super League and Chinese FA Cup.

He became a FIFA elite referee class in 2007. He refereed at 2010 AFF Suzuki Cup, 2014 FIFA World Cup qualifiers, and more international competitions.

In April 2016 Chaiya along with another official named Thanom Borikut were suspended by the AFC Disciplinary Committee for alleged match-fixing.
