= Songsak Chaisamak =

Thai footballer (born 1983)

Personal information
- Full name: Songsak Chaisamak
- Date of birth: 10 July 1983 (age 43)
- Place of birth: Maha Sarakham, Thailand
- Height: 1.81 m (5 ft 11 1/2 in)
- Position: Defender

Senior career*
Years	Team	Apps	(Gls)
2008–2009	Thai Port	3	(0)
2010	Buriram PEA	0	(0)
2011	PTT Rayong		
2012	Udon Thani	7	(0)

International career
1998–1999	Thailand U17		
- * Club domestic league appearances and goals

Songsak Chaisamak (Thai: ทรงศักดิ์ ชัยสมัคร), born 10 July 1983, is a Thai former professional footballer.

== Clubs ==
- Thai Port FC - 2009
- Buriram PEA - 2010
- Udon Thani - 2012

== Honours ==
- 2010 Regional League Division 2 Champions With Buriram FC
- 2011 Thai Division 1 League Champions With Buriram FC
