= Rayong Province Stadium =

Stadium in Thailand

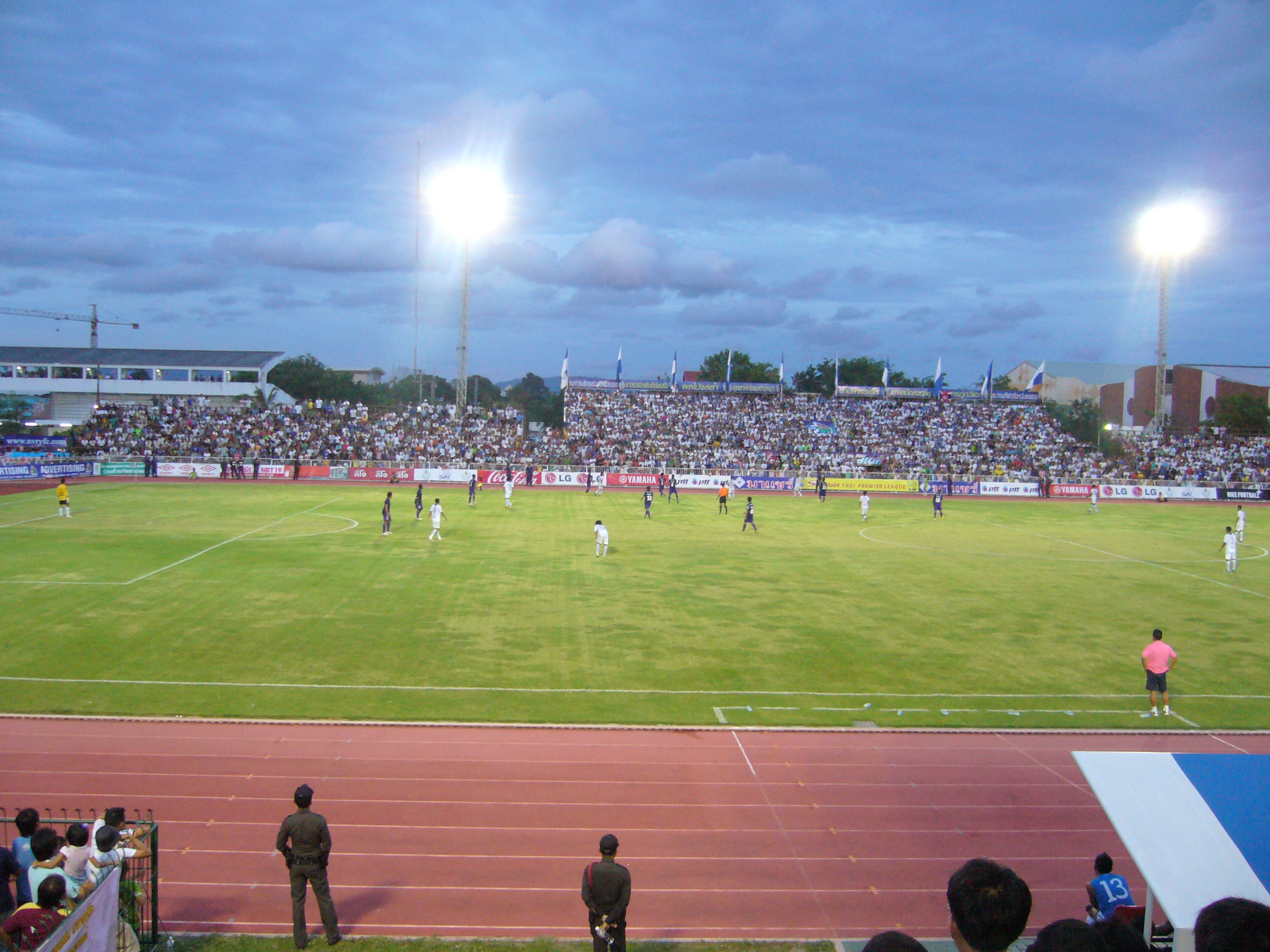
- Interactive map of Rayong Province Stadium
- Location: Rayong, Thailand
- Coordinates: 12°40′49″N 101°14′08″E
- Owner: Rayong Provincial Administrative Organization
- Operator: Rayong Provincial Administrative Organization
- Capacity: 7,500
- Surface: Grass

Construction
- Opened: N/A

Tenants
- Rayong F.C. Pluakdaeng Rayong United F.C.

Rayong Province Stadium (Thai: สนามกีฬากลางจังหวัดระยอง) is a stadium in Mueang Rayong district, Rayong, Thailand. It is currently used for football matches and is the home stadium of Rayong F.C. of the Thai League 1. The stadium holds 7,500 spectators.
