= 2010 Thai FA Cup =

Tournament details
- Country: Thailand
- Dates: 17 March – 28 November 2010
- Teams: 66

Final positions
- Champions: Chonburi (1st title)
- Runners-up: Muangthong United

Tournament statistics
- Top goal scorer(s): Ronnachai Rangsiyo; Pipob On-Mo 5 goal

The Thai FA Cup 2010 (Thai: มูลนิธิไทยคม เอฟเอคัพ) is the 17th season of Thailand knockout football competition. The tournament is organized by the Football Association of Thailand.

The cup winner were guaranteed a place in the 2011 AFC Cup.

== Calendar ==
Round	Date	Matches	Clubs	New entries this round
Qualifying round	17 March 2010; 24 March 2010	2	4 → 2	4
First round	17 March 2010; 24 March 2010; 31 March 2010; 7 April 2010; 21 April 2010	16	2+30 → 16	30
Second round	12 May 2010; 19 May 2010; 26 May 2010; 30 May 2010; 2 June 2010; 9 June 2010	16	16+16→ 16	16
Third round	16 June 2010; 23 June 2010; 30 June 2010; 7 July 2010; 11 July 2010; 14 July 2010; 31 July 2010; 1 August 2010	16	16+16→ 16	16
Fourth round	11 August 2010; 25 August 2010; 26 August 2010; 5 September 2010; 7 September 2010	8	16 → 8	–
Quarter-finals	15 September 2010; 27 October 2010	4	8 → 4	–
Semi-finals	30 October 2010	2	4 → 2	–
Final	28 November 2010	1	2 → Champions	–

== Qualifying round ==
Team 1	Score	Team 2
17 March 2010
Kamphaeng Phet	1 – 1 (4 – 2 p)	Ampur Ta Chang
24 March 2010
Wat Suthiwararam AA	1 – 1 (5 – 3 p)	Pattaya City Hot Tuna

== First round ==
Team 1	Score	Team 2
17 March 2010
Samut Sakhon JK FC	5 – 1	Vongchavalitkul University AA
24 March 2010
Rayong	4 – 1	Dhummanusorn Foundation
Bangkok IPE – Sananrak Municipality	3 – 1	Krungkao SA
31 March 2010
FC Phuket	2 – 1	Nakhon Ratchasima
Thonglor FC	3 – 1	Tak
Ratchaburi	4 – 1	Nakhon Sawan Rajabhat University
Pattaya FC	1 – 0	Nakhon Sawan
7 April 2010
Nakhon Ratchasima Sports School	0 – 0 (4 – 5 p)	Bangkok Christian College
Samut Prakan	2 – 1	Kasem Bundit University
Hat Yai	0 – 1	Raj-Vithi
Cha Choeng Sao	2 – 2 (2 – 5 p)	Kamphaeng Phet
Ban Beung-Nawa nakhon	1 – 0	Wat Suthiwararam AA
21 April 2010
Mahasarakham City	2 – 2 (5 – 7 p)	Bangkok
Thai Airways-Look Isan	1 – 3	Personnel of Globlex Securities
University of North Bangkok	3 – 2	Ayutthaya
Ang Thong	2 – 1	Surin

== Second round ==
Team 1	Score	Team 2
12 May 2010
Samut Prakan	1 – 2	FC Phuket
Raj-Vithi	2 – 1	Ang Thong
Kamphaeng Phet	1 – 3	Ratchaburi
19 May 2010
Thonglor FC	0 – 2	Ban Beung-Nawa nakhon
Khonkaen	2 – 1	Thai Honda
Rayong	1 – 1; 3 – 1(a.e.t.)	Nakhon Pathom
26 May 2010
University of North Bangkok	1 – 3	Prachinburi
Chiangrai United	4 – 0	Personnel of Globlex Securities
Raj Pracha-Nonthaburi	4 – 0	Bangkok Sananruka IPE
30 May 2010
Chula United	4 – 1	Bangkok Christian College
Pattaya FC	1 – 5	RBAC Mittraphap
Sriracha	1 – 0	Songkhla
2 June 2010
Suphanburi	1 – 0	Chanthaburi
Air Force United	1 – 1 (4 – 3 p)	Bangkok
9 June 2010
Samut Sakhon JK FC	1 – 1 (5 – 4 p)	PTT

== Third round ==
Team 1	Score	Team 2
16 June 2010
Samut Songkhram	1 – 1; 3 – 1(a.e.t.)	Phuket
Buriram PEA	6 – 0	Raj-Vithi
Muangthong United	11 – 0	Ban Beung-Nawa nakhon
23 June 2010
Suphanburi	1 – 2	Royal Thai Army
Thai Port	2 – 3	Pattaya United
30 June 2010
Chula United	1 – 1 (5 – 6 p)	Sisaket
Sriracha	4 – 0	Ratchaburi
TOT-CAT	1 – 1 (4 – 5 p)	Osotspa Saraburi
7 July 2010
Rajnavy Rayong	0 – 0; 1 – 0(a.e.t.)	Bangkok Glass
Chonburi	1 – 0	Samut Sakhon
11 July 2010
Nakhon Pathom	2 – 1	Suvarnabhumi Customs
RBAC Mittraphap	0 – 1	Air Force United
Raj Pracha-Nonthaburi	3 – 1	Prachinburi
14 July 2010
TTM Phichit	0 – 0; 2 – 1(a.e.t.)	Police United
31 July 2010
Bangkok United	4 – 2	Khonkaen
1 August 2010
Chiangrai United	1 – 1; 1 – 2(a.e.t.)	BEC Tero Sasana

== Fourth round ==
Team 1	Score	Team 2
11 August 2010
BEC Tero Sasana	2 – 3	Nakhon Pathom
Pattaya United	1 – 0	Osotspa Saraburi
25 August 2010
'Raj Pracha-Nonthaburi	2 – 0	Sriracha
Chonburi	4 – 1	Samut Songkhram
26 August 2010
Royal Thai Army	0 – 0; 1 – 0(a.e.t.)	Buriram PEA
Muangthong United	4 – 0	Air Force United
5 September 2010
Sisaket	3 – 0	TTM Phichit
7 September 2010
Rajnavy Rayong	3 – 1	Bangkok United

== Quarter-finals ==
Team 1	Score	Team 2
15 September 2010
Rajnavy Rayong	2 – 1	Sisaket
Royal Thai Army	4 – 1	Nakhon Pathom
Pattaya United	0 – 2	Chonburi
26 October 2010
Muangthong United	4–0	Raj Pracha-Nonthaburi

== Semi-finals ==
Team 1	Score	Team 2
30 October 2010
Rajnavy Rayong	0 – 1	Muangthong United
Royal Thai Army	0 – 2	Chonburi

== Finals ==
Team 1	Score	Team 2
28 November 2010
Muangthong United	1–2	Chonburi
