= Khao Kradong Stadium =

Football stadium in Buriram, Thailand

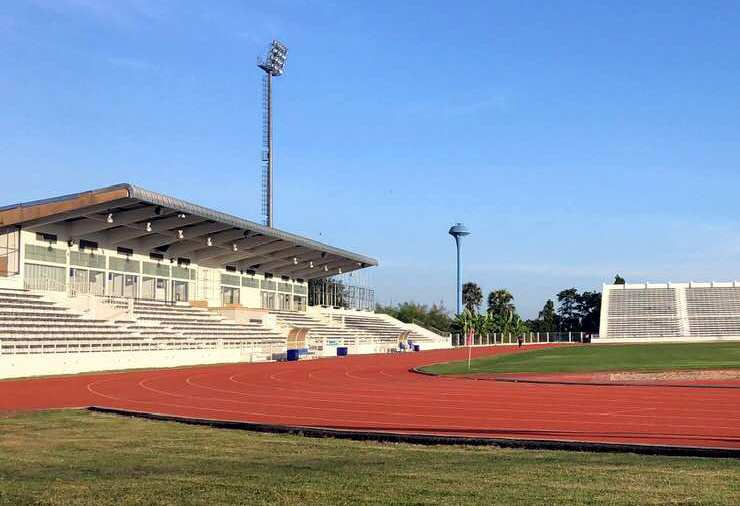
- Interactive map of Khao Kradong Stadium
- Full name: Khao Kradong Stadium
- Location: Buriram, Thailand
- Coordinates: 14°56′45″N 103°06′13″E
- Owner: Buriram Municipality
- Operator: Buriram Municipality
- Capacity: 8,000
- Surface: Grass

Construction
- Opened: N/A

Khao Kradong Stadium (Thai: สนามกีฬาเขากระโดง), or Buriram City Stadium, is a football stadium in Buriram, Thailand. It is used for football matches. The stadium's capacity is 8,000 spectators and is currently used mostly for football matches, serving as the home stadium to Buriram United Academy.

== Events ==
=== Notable events ===
- 2022 AFC Champions League group stage

Date	Home	Results	Away	Attendances
15 April 2022	Shandong Taishan (China)	0–7	(South Korea) Daegu FC	272
18 April 2022	Daegu FC (South Korea)	0–3	(Singapore) Lion City Sailors	237
21 April 2022	Shandong Taishan (China)	0–0	(Singapore) Lion City Sailors	225
24 April 2022	Urawa Red Diamonds (Japan)	0–0	(South Korea) Daegu FC	436
27 April 2022	Urawa Red Diamonds (Japan)	6–0	(Singapore) Lion City Sailors	313
30 April 2022	Shandong Taishan (China)	0–5	(Japan) Urawa Red Diamonds	393
