= Saraburi =

Coordinates: 14°31′43″N 100°54′41″E

Saraburi สระบุรี
- City
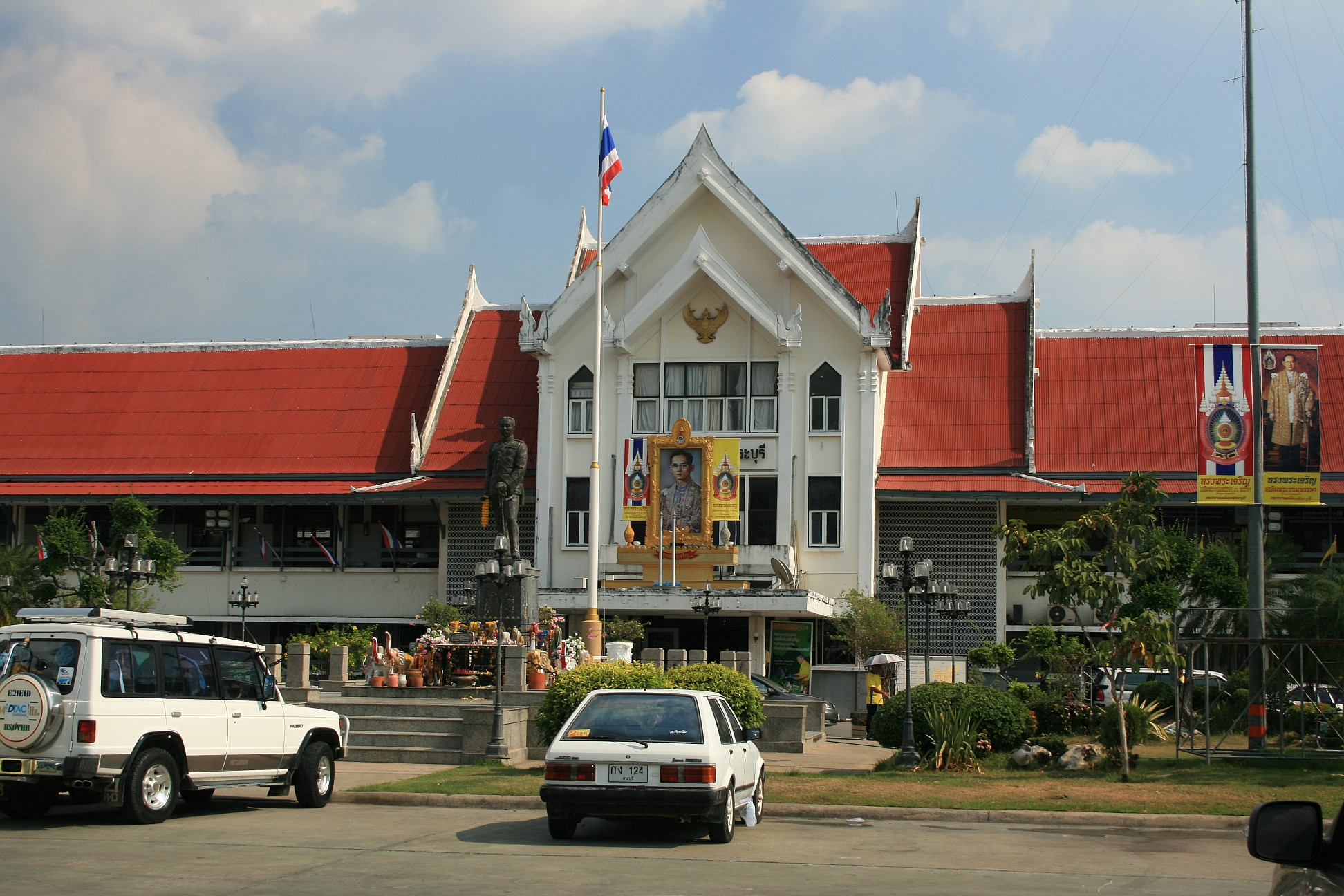

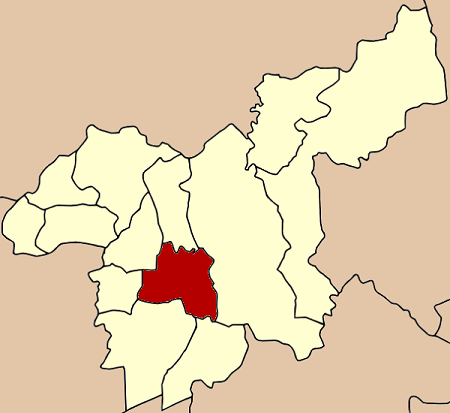
- Location in Saraburi Province
- Country: Thailand
- Province: Saraburi Province
- District: Amphoe Mueang Saraburi

Area
  - Land: 7.8 sq mi (20.1 km^{2})

Population (2020)
  - Total: 60,809
- Time zone: UTC+7 (ICT)
- Postal code: 18000
- Website: http://www.tmsbr.go.th

Saraburi City (thesaban mueang) is the provincial capital of Saraburi Province in central Thailand. In 2020, it had a population of 60,809 people, and covers the complete tambon Pak Phriao of the Mueang Saraburi district.

== Location ==
Saraburi sits on the banks of the Pa Sak River, around 60 km upstream from the confluence with the Chao Phraya River and around 60 km downstream from the Pasak Chonlasit Dam.

The city is around 100 km northeast of Bangkok, 40 km northeast of Phra Nakhon Sri Ayutthaya, and 50 km west of Khao Yai National Park.

== History ==
Saraburi was founded in 1549 as a base for troop recruitment by King Maha Chakkraphat due to the threat of the growing Burmese Toungoo Dynasty.

In 1624, Wat Phra Phutthabat was built by King Songtham of Ayutthaya on the city.

The royal decree established the Saraburi Municipality on 10 December 1835 with an area of 5 square kilometers.

== Demographics ==
Since 2005, the population of Saraburi has been fluctuating up and down, however, the city's population in 2005 is greater than what it is as of 2020.

Estimation date	31 Dec 2005	31 Dec 2010	31 Dec 2015	31 Dec 2019
Population	61,900	63,554	61,840	60,809
