= Royal Thai Army Stadium =

Multi-purpose football stadium in Bangkok, Thailand

Royal Thai Army Stadium สนามกีฬากองทัพบก
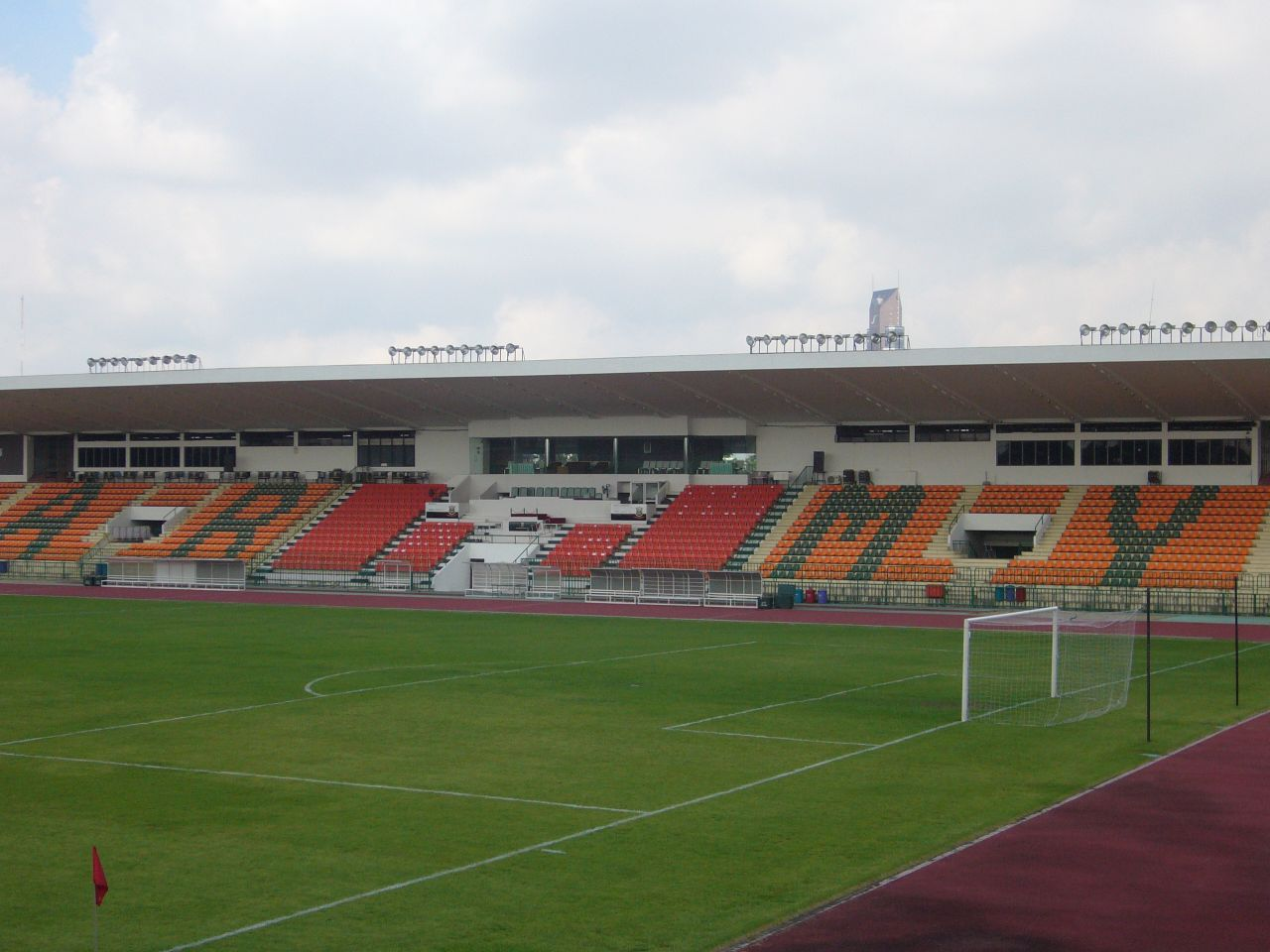
- Interactive map of Royal Thai Army Stadium สนามกีฬากองทัพบก
- Full name: Royal Thai Army Stadium
- Location: Phaya Thai, Bangkok, Thailand
- Coordinates: 13°46′58″N 100°33′22″E
- Owner: Royal Security Command
- Capacity: 20,000
- Surface: grass

Construction
- Built: 1968
- Opened: 1970
- Renovated: 2015

The Royal Thai Army Stadium (Thai: สนามกีฬากองทัพบก) is a multi-purpose stadium on Vibhavadi Rangsit Road in the Phaya Thai of north Bangkok, Thailand. It is currently used mostly for football matches. The stadium holds 20,000 and has a single stand with covered seating on one side and terracing on three sides. An athletics track surrounds the pitch. It is often used by Thai club sides in international football competitions and was used by Bangkok University FC in the 2007 AFC Champions League and Osotsapa FC in the 2007 AFC Cup. Additionally, it has been used for matches involving national sides in international tournaments hosted by Thailand where the hosts are not involved.

Other stadiums in Bangkok include National Stadium, Rajamangala National Stadium, the Thai-Japanese Stadium, and Chulalongkorn University Stadium.

== History ==
Royal Thai Army Stadium was approved to be built in 1966 when Field Marshal Sarit Thanarat is the Commander in Chief of the Royal Thai Army. The construction started in 1968 and completed in 1970 on an area of 61 rai consisting of a football stadium with a capacity of 12,500 people (at that time) and also built 4 chord tennis courts, 4 petanque courts, 1 boxing practice center and the athlete's residence 4 floors, amount 1 unit along the way.

With the transfer of the 1st Infantry Regiment, which operates the stadium, to the Royal Security Command, the stadium no longer belongs to the Royal Thai Army, and as a result of Army United FC no longer plays there.
