= Royal Thai Army F.C. =

Thai football club

Royal Thai Army ทหารบก เอฟซี
- Full name: Royal Thai Army Football Club สโมสรฟุตบอลทหารบก
- Nickname: Thai Army
- Founded: 2011; 15 years ago (as Army Welfare Department); 2015; 11 years ago (as Royal Thai Army)
- Ground: Thai Army Sports Stadium; Bangkok, Thailand
- Capacity: 20,000
- Owner: Royal Thai Army
- Chairman: Lt.Gen. Bunnawat Makomon
- Manager: Col. Somsakul Vijitraparb
- Coach: Lt. Adul Chumsaeng
- League: Thai League 3
- 2025–26: Thai League 3, 8th of 11 in the Western region
Home colours	Away colours

Royal Thai Army Football Club (Thai: สโมสรฟุตบอลทหารบก) is a Thailand football club under the stewardship of Royal Thai Army based in Bangkok. The team plays their home matches at Thai Army Sports Stadium. The club is currently playing in the Thai League 3 Bangkok metropolitan region.

Prior to 2015 the club was called "Army Welfare Department F.C.". After it was promoted from winner Khǒr Royal Cup to Regional League Division 2, the club changed its name to Royal Thai Army F.C..

== History ==
In 2022, Royal Thai Army competed in the Thai League 3 for the 2022–23 season. It is their 8th season in the professional league. The club started the season with a 0–1 home defeat to Royal Thai Air Force and they ended the season with a 1–3 away defeat to Royal Thai Air Force. The club has finished 9th place in the league of the Bangkok metropolitan region.

== Stadium and locations by season records ==
Coordinates	Location	Stadium	Capacity	Year
13°46′58″N 100°33′22″E	Bangkok	Thai Army Sports Stadium	15,000	2015–2017

== Season by season record ==
Season	League									FA Cup	League Cup	T3 Cup	Top goalscorer	
Season	Division	P	W	D	L	F	A	Pts	Pos	FA Cup	League Cup	T3 Cup	Name	Goals
2015	Bangkok	26	11	6	9	31	25	39	6th	Opted out	R1			
2016	Bangkok	20	9	6	5	30	28	33	4th	Opted out	R1			
2017	T3 Lower	28	13	6	9	46	39	45	4th	R1	Opted out		(Thailand) Kraisorn Sriyan	14
2018	T3 Lower	26	10	5	11	30	31	35	7th	R2	Opted out		(Thailand) Nattapong Kumnaet (Thailand) Noppadon Kasaen	6
2019	T3 Lower	26	4	7	15	29	45	19	13th	R1	Opted out		(Thailand) Nattapong Kumnaet	5
2020–21	T3 Bangkok	20	5	7	8	18	33	22	10th	Opted out	Opted out		(Thailand) Niphon Kamthong (Thailand) Sattra Phokham (Thailand) Atikan Koakaew	3
2021–22	T3 Bangkok	26	7	12	7	24	23	33	9th	Opted out	Opted out		(Thailand) Krismy Seungtrakoolchai (Thailand) Noppadon Kasaen	4
2022–23	T3 Bangkok	26	8	6	12	25	39	30	9th	Opted out	Opted out		(Thailand) Surat Suriyachai	7
2023–24	T3 Bangkok	26	5	6	15	27	59	21	9th	Opted out	Opted out	Opted out	(Thailand) Rungsak Kothcharak (Thailand) Sukrit Kuninthanee	4
2024–25	T3 West	22	2	9	11	23	40	15	11th	Opted out	Opted out	Opted out	(Thailand) Kanokphol Nuchrungrueang	4
2025–26	T3 West	20	4	9	7	19	24	21	8th	Opted out	Opted out	Opted out	(Thailand) Atikan Koakaew	7

Champions	Runners-up	Promoted	Relegated

- P = Played
- W = Games won
- D = Games drawn
- L = Games lost
- F = Goals for
- A = Goals against
- Pts = Points
- Pos = Final position
- QR1 = First Qualifying Round
- QR2 = Second Qualifying Round
- R1 = Round 1
- R2 = Round 2
- R3 = Round 3
- R4 = Round 4
- R5 = Round 5
- R6 = Round 6
- QF = Quarter-finals
- SF = Semi-finals
- RU = Runners-up
- W = Winners

== Players ==
=== Current squad ===
As of 30 September 2024

Note: Flags indicate national team as defined under FIFA eligibility rules; some limited exceptions apply. Players may hold more than one non-FIFA nationality.

No.	Pos.	Nation	Player
5	MF	THA	Tanapon Sintam
6	MF	THA	Narongsak Saekaw
7	MF	THA	Atikan Koakaew
8	MF	THA	Anusorn Phrmprasit
9	MF	THA	Phisit Supattanakul
10	FW	THA	Kanokphol Nuchrungrueang
13	FW	THA	Noppadon Kasaen
14	MF	THA	Chanawat Sukkasem
17	MF	THA	irayut Promthawee
18	MF	THA	Kornwat Kumkaew
19	DF	THA	Rungradid Drchuppakarn
20	MF	THA	Chatchana Sripho
22	DF	THA	Chatchai Mokkasem
23	DF	THA	Siwarorn Yaekkhoksung
27	MF	THA	Phakphoom Sopa

No.	Pos.	Nation	Player
29	DF	THA	Pornchai Ilnnok
30	GK	THA	Ratchanon Khunphrom
33	DF	THA	Thanapat Jumpahom
36	MF	THA	Phuvasit Khamkten
39	GK	THA	Natthawut Thaongoen
42	GK	THA	Banleusak Khakhai
47	DF	THA	Dejthanakorn Treecha
62	MF	THA	Wathanyou Promsophar
63	MF	THA	Titiwat Boonrapang
64	DF	THA	Wasawat Madadam
66	DF	THA	Danusorn Somchob
69	DF	THA	Suphod Bujaraikhing
70	MF	THA	Apirak Dawrueng
88	MF	THA	Thanarat Thumsaen
99	DF	THA	Wasin Tiammuang

== Honours ==
- Khǒr Royal Cup
  - Winners (1): 2014
