= 2010 Samut Songkhram F.C. season =

Samut Songkhram
2010 season
- Chairman: Somchai Tanprasert
- Manager: Somchai Chuayboonchum
- Thai Premier League: 8th
- FA Cup: Fourth round
- Queen's Cup: Quarter-finals
Home colours	Away colours

The 2010 season was Samut Songkhram's 3rd season in the top division of Thai football. This article shows statistics of the club's players in the season, and also lists all matches that the club played in the season.

== Chronological list of events ==
- 10 November 2009: The Thai Premier League 2010 season first leg fixtures were announced.
- 25 August 2010: Samut Songkhram were knocked out by Chonburi in the FA Cup fourth round.
- 24 October 2010: Samut Songkhram finished in 8th place in the Thai Premier League.

== Players ==
=== Current squad ===
Updated 18 January 2010 Note: Flags indicate national team as defined under FIFA eligibility rules; some limited exceptions apply. Players may hold more than one non-FIFA nationality.

No.	Pos.	Nation	Player
1	GK	THA	Puthasas Boonpok (vice captain)
6	MF	THA	Annop Chaipan
8	MF	THA	Ekkapoom Potharungroj
10	MF	THA	Panuwat Yimsa-ngar
11	FW	THA	Pichet In-bang
13	MF	THA	Patcharin Sooksai
14	FW	THA	Jirawat Kaewboran (captain)
18	GK	THA	Chayoot Nakchamnarn
19	MF	THA	Tripob Shushuenklin

No.	Pos.	Nation	Player
21	DF	THA	Kantapol Sompittayanurak
27	FW	CIV	Bireme Dioue
28	MF	CMR	Michel Charlin Tcheumaleu
29	DF	THA	Ekkasak Buabao
30	MF	CMR	Tchoumi Houmi Elvis
31	MF	THA	Sittipan Chumchuay
32	DF	THA	Prasarn Pansamlee
33	DF	THA	Suksayam Chanmaneewech

=== 2010 Season transfers ===
In

Note: Flags indicate national team as defined under FIFA eligibility rules; some limited exceptions apply. Players may hold more than one non-FIFA nationality.

No.	Pos.	Nation	Player
—	MF	THA	Ekkapoom Potharungroj (from Nakhon Pathom FC)
—	MF	THA	Panuwat Yimsa-ngar (from Nakhon Pathom FC)
—	FW	THA	Pichet In-bang (from Sriracha FC)
—	MF	THA	Weerayut Suebsai (from Udon Thani FC)

Out

Note: Flags indicate national team as defined under FIFA eligibility rules; some limited exceptions apply. Players may hold more than one non-FIFA nationality.

No.	Pos.	Nation	Player
—	MF	THA	Songwut Buapetch (to TTM Phichit)
—	DF	THA	Korawit Namwiset (to Bangkok United)
—	GK	THA	Todsaporn Sriruang (to TTM Phichit)
—	DF	THA	Patipat Rorbru (to Police United FC)
—	MF	THA	Santipap Siri (to TTM Phichit)
—	DF	THA	Chompon Buangam (to Pattaya United)
—	DF	THA	Kittipong Loon-jak (to Ranong FC)
—	MF	THA	Atthapol Poonarae (to -)
—	MF	THA	Kittiraj Sanor (to -)
—	MF	THA	Wittaya Nontalee (to -)
—	MF	THA	Samkhan Promsombut (to -)
—	DF	THA	Prasert Choei-Taisong (to -)

== Results ==
=== Thai Premier League ===
21 March 2010	Samut Songkhram	1–0	Thai Port	Samut Songkhram Stadium, Samut Songkhram

27 March 2010	Buriram PEA	3–1	Samut Songkhram	i-mobile Stadium, Buriram

3 April 2010	Samut Songkhram	1–0	Bangkok Glass	Samut Songkhram
				Stadium: Samut Songkhram Stadium

11 April 2010	Police United	1–2	Samut Songkhram	Bangkok
				Stadium: Thammasat Rangsit Stadium

24 April 2010	Samut Songkhram	1–0	Rajnavy Rayong	Samut Songkhram Stadium, Samut Songkhram

2 May 2010	Chonburi	0–0	Samut Songkhram	Chonburi
18:00 UTC+7				Stadium: IPE Chonburi Stadium; Attendance: 10,097

9 May 2010	Sisaket	1–1	Samut Songkhram	Sisaket
				Stadium: Sri Nakhon Lamduan Stadium

23 May 2010	Pattaya United	2–0	Samut Songkhram	Pattaya
				Stadium: Nongprue Municipality Football Field

1 June 2010	Samut Songkhram	0–1	Osotspa Saraburi	Samut Songkhram Stadium, Samut Songkhram

5 June 2010	BEC Tero Sasana	2–1	Samut Songkhram	Thephasadin Stadium, Bangkok

13 June 2010	Samut Songkhram	4–2	Royal Thai Army	Samut Songkhram Stadium, Samut Songkhram

20 June 2010	Samut Songkhram	2–0	TOT-CAT	Samut Songkhram Stadium, Samut Songkhram

26 June 2010	Muangthong United	5–0	Samut Songkhram	Yamaha Stadium, Nonthaburi

4 July 2010	Samut Songkhram	0–2	Bangkok United	Samut Songkhram Stadium, Samut Songkhram

10 July 2010	Samut Songkhram	0–0	TTM Phichit	Samut Songkhram Stadium, Samut Songkhram

17 July 2010	Thai Port	1–0	Samut Songkhram	PAT Stadium, Bangkok

24 July 2010	Samut Songkhram	0–0	Buriram PEA	Samut Songkhram Stadium, Samut Songkhram

28 July 2010	Bangkok Glass	3–1	Samut Songkhram	Leo Stadium, Pathumthani

7 August 2010	Samut Songkhram	1–1	Police United	Samut Songkhram Stadium, Samut Songkhram

15 August 2010	Osotspa Saraburi	0–0	Samut Songkhram	M-150 Saraburi Stadium, Saraburi

18 August 2010	Rajnavy Rayong	0–0	Samut Songkhram	Rayong Stadium, Rayong

22 August 2010	Samut Songkhram	0–2	Chonburi	Samut Songkhram Stadium, Samut Songkhram

11 September 2010	TTM Phichit	1–3	Samut Songkhram	Phichit Stadium, Phichit

19 September 2010	Samut Songkhram	2–0	Pattaya United	Samut Songkhram Stadium, Samut Songkhram

25 September 2010	Samut Songkhram	1–0	BEC Tero Sasana	Samut Songkhram Stadium, Samut Songkhram

29 September 2010	Royal Thai Army	2–3	Samut Songkhram	Bangkok
				Stadium: Thai Army Sports Stadium

3 October 2010	TOT-CAT	2–1	Samut Songkhram	Nonthaburi
18.00 UTC+7				Stadium: Yamaha Stadium

10 October 2010	Samut Songkhram	1–0	Sisaket	Samut Songkhram Stadium, Samut Songkhram

22 October 2010	Samut Songkhram	0–0	Muangthong United	Samut Songkhram Stadium, Samut Songkhram

==== League table ====
Pos	Team	Pld	W	D	L	GF	GA	GD	Pts
6	Pattaya United	30	12	9	9	43	38	+5	45
7	Osotspa M-150 Saraburi	30	10	12	8	32	30	+2	42
8	Samut Songkhram	30	11	9	10	27	32	−5	42
9	BEC Tero Sasana	30	9	8	13	39	42	−3	35
10	Rajnavy Rayong	30	8	9	13	35	52	−17	33

Updated to match(es) played on 24 October 2010. Source: FIFA.com
Rules for classification: 1st points; 2nd head-to-head; 3rd match win; 4th goal difference; 5th number of goals scored

=== FA Cup ===
==== Third round ====
16 June 2010	Samut Songkhram	1–1 (3 – 1 a.e.t)	Phuket	Samut Songkhram Stadium, Samut Songkhram

==== Fourth round ====
25 August 2010	Chonburi	4–1	Samut Songkhram	IPE Chonburi Stadium, Chonburi

=== League Cup ===
==== First round ====
===== 1st leg =====
28 August 2010	Nakhon Ratchasima	0–1	Samut Songkhram	5 December Stadium, Nakhon Ratchasima

===== 2nd leg =====
1 September 2010	Samut Songkhram	7–0	Nakhon Ratchasima	Samut Songkhram Stadium, Samut Songkhram

==== First round ====
===== 1st leg =====
8 September 2010	Chula United	0–2	Samut Songkhram	Chulalongkorn University Sports Stadium, Bangkok

===== 2nd leg =====
15 September 2010	Samut Songkhram	2–3	Chula United	Samut Songkhram Stadium, Samut Songkhram

=== Queen's Cup ===
6 February 2010	Thai Port	4–4	Samut Songkhram	Saraburi
16:00 UTC+7	Jakkrit 34'; Sarayoot 39', 47', 67'		Jirawat 5'; Apinan 17'; Diouf 45'; Sitthiphan 83'	Stadium: Saraburi Central Stadium

8 February 2010	Osotspa Saraburi	0–2	Samut Songkhram	Saraburi
18:30 UTC+7			Pichet 36'; Michel 90+3'	Stadium: Saraburi Central Stadium

10 February 2010	Samut Songkhram	2–2	Royal Thai Army	Saraburi
16:00 UTC+7	Tripob 56'; Sittipan 88'		Tanakorn 62', 85'	Stadium: Saraburi Central Stadium

14 February 2010	Samut Songkhram	0–2	Chonburi	Chonburi
18:00 UTC+7			Rangsan 66', 86'	Stadium: Sirindhorn Stadium
