= 2015 Port F.C. season =

Port MTI
2015 season
- Chairman: Nualphan Lamsam
- Manager: Somchai Subpherm
- Stadium: PAT Stadium
- Thai Premier League: ?
- Thai FA Cup: Round of 16
- Thai League Cup: Round of 32
- Top goalscorer: League: Wuttichai Tathong (3); All: Gorka Unda (4); Lee Ho (4)
Home colours	Away colours

The 2015 season was Port MTI 's 19th season in the Thai Premier League of Port F.C. Football Club.

== Thai Premier League ==
Pos	Team	Pld	W	D	L	GF	GA	GD	Pts	Qualification or relegation
14	Saraburi	34	8	11	15	41	56	−15	35	Club resigned and folded
15	Navy	34	10	5	19	42	65	−23	35	
16	BEC Tero Sasana	34	7	14	13	42	51	−9	35	
17	Port (R)	34	10	3	21	31	49	−18	33	Relegation to the 2016 Thai Division 1 League
18	TOT (R)	34	3	7	24	25	71	−46	16	Relegation to the 2016 Thai Division 1 League

Updated to match(es) played on 13 December 2015. Source: Thai Premier League
Rules for classification: 1) points; 2) head-to-head points; 3) head-to-head goal difference; 4) goal difference; 5) number of goals scored
(R) Relegated

Date	Opponents	H / A	Result F–A	Scorers
14 February 2015	Buriram United	A	2-0	
21 February 2015	Gulf Saraburi	H	2-1	Saruta 14', Suradej 86'
28 February 2015	BEC Tero Sasana	A	2-0	
7 March 2015	SCG Muangthong United	A	1-0	
11 March 2015	Suphanburi	H	0-2	
4 April 2015	Sisaket	A	2-1	Rachanon 90'
25 April 2015	Chiangrai United	H	2-1	McGrath 42', Unda 70'
29 April 2015	Chonburi	A	4-1	McGrath 20'
3 May 2015	Navy	H	2-1	Unda 42'
9 May 2015	Bangkok United	A	2-0	
21 June 2015	Ratchaburi Mitr Phol	H	0-1	
28 June 2015	Army United	A	1-0	
5 July 2015	TOT	H	2-0	Unda 77', Lee Ho 90'
11 July 2015	Osotspa M-150	A	1-0	
15 July 2015	Nakhon Ratchasima Mazda	H	1-2	Nirut 90'
18 July 2015	Chainat Hornbill	A	1-0	
25 July 2015	Bangkok Glass	H	0-1	
2 August 2015	Gulf Saraburi	A	2-2	Lee Ho 48', Wuttichai 90'
9 August 2015	BEC Tero Sasana	H	2-0	Wuttichai 24', Jirawat 65'
19 August 2015	Suphanburi	A	2-1	Wuttichai 52'
13 September 2015	Chiangrai United	A	0-0	

== Thai FA Cup ==
Chang FA Cup

Date	Opponents	H / A	Result F–A	Scorers	Round
24 June 2015	BBCU	H	3-1	Vincent 27', Unda 78', Rochela 89'	Round of 64
29 July 2015	TOT	H	3–3 (8–7p)	Lee Ho 37', Wasan 88'(o.g.), McGrath 102'	Round of 32
12 August 2015	Army United	A	2-1	Sunny 45'(o.g.)	Round of 16

== Thai League Cup ==
Toyota League Cup

Date	Opponents	H / A	Result F–A	Scorers	Round
19 April 2015	Kabin United	H	6-0	Lee Ho 27', McGrath 39', Saruta 61', Adisorn 67', Ekkapoom 77', Suchon 86'	Round of 64
1 July 2015	Pattaya United	A	2-1	Ekkapoom 61'	Round of 32

== Squad statistics ==
No.	Pos.	Name	League		FA Cup		League Cup		Total		Discipline	
No.	Pos.	Name	Apps	Goals	Apps	Goals	Apps	Goals	Apps	Goals	Yellow card	Red card
1	GK	(Thailand) Weera Koedpudsa	0	0	0	0	0	0	0	0	0	0
3	DF	(Thailand) Prakasit Sansook	0	0	0	0	0	0	0	0	0	0
4	MF	(Thailand) Naronrit Samonpan	0	0	0	0	0	0	0	0	0	0
5	DF	(Thailand) Suradej Saotaisong	0	0	0	0	0	0	0	0	0	0
6	MF	(Thailand) Ratchanat Bamrungchart	0	0	0	0	0	0	0	0	0	0
7	MF	(Thailand) Ittipol Poolsap	0	0	0	0	0	0	0	0	0	0
8	MF	(Thailand) Ekkapoom Potharungroj	0	0	0	0	0	0	0	0	0	0
10	MF	(Japan) Hironori Saruta	0	0	0	0	0	0	0	0	0	0
11	DF	(Thailand) Suchon Sa-nguandee	0	0	0	0	0	0	0	0	0	0
12	MF	(Thailand) Jirawat Makarom (vc)	0	0	0	0	0	0	0	0	0	0
13	MF	(Thailand) Adisorn Daeng-rueng	0	0	0	0	0	0	0	0	0	0
14	FW	(Thailand) Sompong Soleb	0	0	0	0	0	0	0	0	0	0
16	MF	(Thailand) Nattakit Fongwitoo	0	0	0	0	0	0	0	0	0	0
17	MF	(Spain) Gorka Unda	0	0	0	0	0	0	0	0	0	0
19	MF	(Thailand) Siwakorn Jakkuprasat	0	0	0	0	0	0	0	0	0	0
21	FW	(New Zealand) Kayne Vincent	0	0	0	0	0	0	0	0	0	0
22	DF	(Spain) David Rochela	0	0	0	0	0	0	0	0	0	0
23	FW	(Thailand) Wuttichai Tathong	0	0	0	0	0	0	0	0	0	0
24	DF	(Thailand) Nantachot Pona	0	0	0	0	0	0	0	0	0	0
26	DF	(Thailand) Todsapol Lated	0	0	0	0	0	0	0	0	0	0
27	MF	(Thailand) Kiatjarern Ruangparn (c)	0	0	0	0	0	0	0	0	0	0
28	DF	(South Korea) Lee Ho	0	0	0	0	0	0	0	0	0	0
32	DF	(Thailand) Piyachart Tamaphan	0	0	0	0	0	0	0	0	0	0
34	DF	(Thailand) Pongpipat Kamnuan	0	0	0	0	0	0	0	0	0	0
36	GK	(Thailand) Worawut Kaewpook	0	0	0	0	0	0	0	0	0	0
38	GK	(Thailand) Narong Wisetsri	0	0	0	0	0	0	0	0	0	0
40	DF	(Thailand) Nitipong Selanon	0	0	0	0	0	0	0	0	0	0
—	FW	(Australia) Brent McGrath	0	0	0	0	0	0	0	0	0	0
—	MF	(Thailand) Assaming Mae	0	0	0	0	0	0	0	0	0	0
—	MF	(Thailand) Kantapol Sompittayanurak	0	0	0	0	0	0	0	0	0	0
—	FW	(Thailand) Pichet In-bang	0	0	0	0	0	0	0	0	0	0
—	DF	(Thailand) Suksayam Chanmaneewech	0	0	0	0	0	0	0	0	0	0
—	—	Own goals	–	–	–	–	–	–	–	–	–	–

== Transfers ==
First Thai footballer's market is opening on 6 November 2014 to 28 January 2015

Second Thai footballer's market is opening on 3 June 2015 to 30 June 2015

=== In ===
Date	Pos.	Name	From
6 November 2014	GK	(Thailand) Worawut Kaewpook	(Thailand) Bangkok
6 November 2014	DF	(Thailand) Suchon Sa-nguandee	(Thailand) Bangkok
23 December 2014	MF	(Spain) Gorka Unda	(Thailand) Sisaket
23 December 2014	DF	(Thailand) Kittiphan Jantatum	(Thailand) BEC Tero Sasana
23 December 2014	MF	(Thailand) Assaming Mae	(Thailand) Police United
23 December 2014	MF	(Thailand) Ratchanat Bamrungchart	(Thailand) Samut Songkhram BTU
23 December 2014	MF	(Thailand) Kantapol Sompittayanurak	(Thailand) Samut Songkhram BTU
23 December 2014	DF	(Thailand) Suksayam Chanmaneewech	(Thailand) Samut Songkhram BTU
23 December 2014	MF	(Thailand) Adisorn Daeng-rueng	(Thailand) Samut Songkhram BTU
4 January 2015	GK	(Thailand) Adisak Duangsri	(Thailand) Phuket
4 January 2015	MF	(Thailand) Ittipol Poolsap	(Thailand) Police United
13 January 2015	MF	(Thailand) Naronrit Samonpan	(Thailand) Air Force Central
13 January 2015	GK	(Thailand) Narong Wisetsri	
19 January 2015	DF	(Thailand) Pongpipat Kamnuan	(Thailand) Samut Songkhram BTU
19 January 2015	DF	(South Korea) Lee Ho	(South Korea) Daejeon Citizen
23 January 2015	FW	(Thailand) Pichet In-bang	(Thailand) PTT Rayong
3 June 2015	MF	(Thailand) Jirawat Makarom	(Thailand) BEC Tero Sasana
3 June 2015	DF	(Thailand) Piyachart Tamaphan	(Thailand) Bangkok Glass
27 June 2015	MF	(Thailand) Siwakorn Jakkuprasat	(Thailand) Muangthong United
13 July 2015	GK	(Thailand) Weera Koedpudsa	(Thailand) TOT
13 July 2015	FW	(Thailand) Wuttichai Tathong	(Thailand) Muangthong United
13 July 2015	DF	(Thailand) Todsapol Lated	(Thailand) Muangthong United

=== Out ===
Date	Pos.	Name	To
4 November 2014	MF	(Thailand) Warut Sap-so	(Thailand) Chonburi
13 November 2014	MF	(Thailand) Suradej Saotaisong	(Thailand) BEC Tero Sasana
13 November 2014	DF	(Thailand) Yordrak Namuangrak	(Thailand) Chainat Hornbill
1 December 2014	DF	(Thailand) Sarawut Khongchareon	(Thailand) PTT Rayong
13 December 2014	DF	(Thailand) Visaroot Vaingan	(Thailand) Chonburi
13 December 2014	MF	(South Korea) Kim Geun-Chul	(Thailand) PTT Rayong
13 December 2014	DF	(South Korea) Lee Sang-Ho	(Thailand) PTT Rayong
3 January 2015	FW	(Brazil) Leandro Oliveira	(Thailand) Bangkok Glass
3 January 2015	DF	(Thailand) Sammas Phednuh	(Thailand) Prachuap
3 June 2015	FW	(Thailand) Pichet In-bang	(Thailand) Udon Thani
3 June 2015	DF	(Thailand) Suksayam Chanmaneewech	(Thailand) Udon Thani
3 June 2015	MF	(Thailand) Suphachai Manjitt	(Thailand) Bangkok
3 June 2015	MF	(Thailand) Kantapol Sompittayanurak	(Thailand) TTM
21 Juiy 2015	MF	(Thailand) Assaming Mae	(Thailand) Chainat Hornbill
21 Juiy 2015	FW	(Thailand) Rachanon Srinok	(Thailand) TOT
21 Juiy 2015	GK	(Thailand) Adisak Duangsri	(Thailand) TOT

=== Loan in ===
Date from	Date to	Pos.	Name	To
15 January 2015	31 December 2015	DF	(Thailand) Suradej Saotaisong	(Thailand) BEC Tero Sasana
24 January 2015	26 July 2015	DF	(Australia) Brent McGrath	(Thailand) Chonburi
24 January 2015	31 December 2015	DF	(Thailand) Prakasit Sansook	(Thailand) Bangkok United
24 January 2015	26 July 2015	DF	(Ivory Coast) Diarra Ali	(Thailand) Muangthong United
3 June 2015	31 December 2015	DF	(Thailand) Nitipong Selanon	(Thailand) Buriram United
3 June 2015	31 December 2015	FW	(New Zealand) Kayne Vincent	(Thailand) Buriram United
3 June 2015	31 December 2015	DF	(Spain) David Rochela	(Thailand) Buriram United
25 July 2015	31 December 2015	FW	(Thailand) Sompong Soleb	(Thailand) Bangkok United

=== Loan out ===
Date from	Date to	Pos.	Name	To
3 June 2015	31 December 2015	FW	(Thailand) Nirut Kumsawad	(Thailand) TTM
