= 2017 Thai League 2 =

Thai League 2
- Season: 2017
- Champions: Chainat Hornbill
- Promoted: Chainat Hornbill; Air Force Central; PT Prachuap
- Relegated: to Thai League 3: Songkhla United; Bangkok to Thai League 4: Nakhon Pathom United; Samut Songkhram
- Matches played: 272
- Goals scored: 876 (3.22 per match)
- Top goalscorer: (Brazil) Jonatan Reis (28 goals)
- Biggest home win: 5 goals Chiangmai 5–0 Trat (8 March 2017); Air Force Central 5–0 Army United (2 July 2017); Rayong 5–0 Chiangmai (20 September 2017); Prachuap 7–2 Samut Songkhram (20 September 2017)
- Biggest away win: 5 goals Bangkok 0–5 Angthong (20 September 2017)
- Highest scoring: 10 goals Trat 6–4 Nongbua Pitchaya (15 October 2017)
- Longest winning run: 11 matches Air Force Central
- Longest unbeaten run: 18 matches Chainat Hornbill
- Longest winless run: 16 matches Kasetsart (Cancelled 1 match against BBCU)
- Longest losing run: 5 matches Songkhla United
- Highest attendance: 4,489; Air Force Central 0–2 Chainat Hornbill (20 September 2017)
- Lowest attendance: 170; Bangkok 0–5 Angthong (20 September 2017)
- Total attendance: 395,210
- Average attendance: 1,396

The 2017 Thai League 2 (known as the M-150 Championship for sponsorship reasons) is the 20th season of the League since its establishment in 1997. It is the feeder league for the Thai League T1. A total of 18 teams will compete in the league this season.

== Changes from last season ==
=== Team changes ===
==== From Thai League 2 ====
Promoted to 2017 Thai League
- Thai Honda Ladkrabang
- Ubon UMT United
- Port

==== To Thai League 2 ====
Relegated from 2016 Thai League T1
- Army United
- Chainat Hornbill
- BBCU

Promoted from 2016 Regional League Division 2
- Trat
- Kasetsart
- Nongbua Pitchaya

==== Withdrawn Clubs ====
- BBCU dissolved team. This team is automatically banned 2 years, recover damage subsidy and relegated to 2020 Thai League 4 Bangkok Metropolitan Region.

== Teams ==
=== Stadium and locations ===
Note: Club dissolved during season would shown by grey background.

Locations of the 2017 Thai League 2
Football clubs in Bangkok Metropolitan Region
Dissolved team

| Team | Location | Stadium | Capacity |
|---|---|---|---|
| Air Force Central | Pathum Thani | Thupatemee Stadium | 20,000 |
| Angthong | Angthong | Angthong Provincial Stadium | 6,000 |
| Army United | Bangkok | Thai Army Sports Stadium | 20,000 |
| Bangkok | Bangkok | Bang Mod Honorary Stadium | 8,000 |
| BBCU | Nonthaburi | Nonthaburi Municipality Honorary Stadium | 6,000 |
| Chainat Hornbill | Chainat | Khao Plong Stadium | 12,000 |
| Chiangmai | Chiangmai | Chiangmai 700th Anniversary Stadium (Until 13 May); Chiangmai Municipality Stadium (Since 18 June) | 25,000; 2,500 |
| Kasetsart | Bangkok | TOT Stadium Chaeng Watthana | 5,000 |
| Krabi | Krabi | Krabi Provincial Stadium | 6,000 |
| Lampang | Lampang | Lampang Provincial Stadium | 5,500 |
| Nakhon Pathom United | Nakhon Pathom | Nakhon Pathom Municipality Sport School Stadium | 3,500 |
| Nongbua Pitchaya | Nongbua Lamphu | Nongbua Lamphu Provincial Stadium | 4,500 |
| Prachuap | Prachuap Khirikhan | Sam Ao Stadium | 7,000 |
| PTT Rayong | Rayong | PTT Stadium | 20,000 |
| Rayong | Rayong | Rayong Provincial Stadium | 7,500 |
| Samut Songkhram | Samut Songkhram | Samut Songkhram PAO. Stadium | 6,000 |
| Songkhla United | Songkhla | Na Thawi Municipality Stadium (Until 9 July); Tinsulanon Stadium (Since 6 August) | 2,000; 45,000 |
| Trat | Trat | Trat Provincial Stadium | 6,000 |

=== Sponsoring ===
Note: Club dissolved during season would shown by grey background.

| Team | Kit manufacturer | Shirt sponsor |
|---|---|---|
| Air Force Central | KELA | Central |
| Angthong | EGO Sport | M Wrap |
| Army United | Sakka Sport | Chang |
| Bangkok | Marz | – |
| BBCU | EGO Sport | 3BB |
| Chainat Hornbill | Warrix Sports | Wangkanai |
| Chiangmai | Volt | Leo Beer |
| Kasetsart | Grand Sport | Tanaosree Traditional Chicken |
| Krabi | Poom Planet | Bangkok Airways |
| Lampang | Deffo | Bangkok Airways |
| Nakhon Pathom United | Made by club | Chang |
| Nongbua Pitchaya | Eureka | DURO |
| Prachuap | Gear Athletics | PTG Energy |
| PTT Rayong | Sakka Sport | PTT Group |
| Rayong | Volt | Gulf |
| Samut Songkhram | Volt | Chang |
| Songkhla United | KELA | Muang Thai Insurance |
| Trat | EGO Sport | CP |

=== Personnel ===
Note: Flags indicate national team as has been defined under FIFA eligibility rules. Players may hold more than one non-FIFA nationality; Club dissolved during season would shown by grey background.

| Team | Manager | Head coach | Captain | Vice-captain |
|---|---|---|---|---|
| Air Force Central | (Thailand) Napon Ruechaikarm | (Thailand) Sasom Pobprasert | (Croatia) Aleksandar Kapisoda | (Thailand) Tana Sripandorn |
| Angthong | (Thailand) Paradon Pitsananantakul | (Germany) Reiner Maurer | (Thailand) Kamol Phothong | (Thailand) Sirachat Preedaboon |
| Army United | (Thailand) Kittichet Mahothorn | (Thailand) Thanis Areesngarkul (Until March 2017) (Thailand) Rangsiwut Chaloempathum (March – July 2017) (Argentina) Daniel Blanco (Since July 2017) | (Thailand) Dawuth Dinkhet | (Thailand) Apichet Puttan |
| Bangkok | (Thailand) Yutthana Thaweesappasuk | (Thailand) Supachart Manakij (Until March 2017) (Thailand) Sarawut Treephan (March – July 2017) (Thailand) Uthai Boonmoh (Since July 2017) | (Thailand) Kittisak Hochin | (Thailand) Nithirot Sokuma |
| BBCU | (Thailand) Weerayut Potharamik | (Thailand) Pairoj Borwonwatanadilok (Until March 2017) (Thailand) Worachai Surinsirirat (March – April 2017) | (Thailand) Patiparn Phetphun | (Thailand) Witsanusak Unnoi |
| Chainat Hornbill | (Thailand) Anurut Nakasai | (Germany) Björn Kliem (Until April 2017) (Germany) Dennis Amato (Since April 2017) | (Thailand) Anuwat Noicheunphan | (France) Florent Sinama Pongolle |
| Chiangmai | (Thailand) Phatthadon Chaiyachot | (Japan) Sugao Kambe (Until March 2017) (Thailand) Apisit Im-ampai (March – April 2017) (Thailand) Choketawee Promrut (Since April 2017) | (Thailand) Suwannapat Kingkkaew | (Thailand) Kritsana Klanklin |
| Kasetsart | (Thailand) Chanthanu Sattayawattana | (Thailand) Yuthapong Boon-amporn (Until April 2017) (Thailand) Chusak Sriphum (April – August 2017) (Thailand) Adul Luekijna (Since August 2017) | (Thailand) Niweat Siriwong | (Thailand) Chindanai Wongpraset |
| Krabi | (Thailand) Wichai Limwattanakul | (Thailand) Pol Chomchuen (Until April 2017) (Thailand) Jetniphat Rachatachalermroj (April – September 2017) (Thailand) Wirat Keayiwa (Since September 2017) | (Thailand) Thaweepong Jaroenrup | (Ivory Coast) Koné Seydou |
| Lampang | (Thailand) Sunee Sommee | (Thailand) Surachai Jirasirichote (Until July 2017) (Thailand) Sutee Suksomkit (Since July 2017) | (Thailand) Jirawat Makarom | (Thailand) Kittikun Jamsuwan |
| Nakhon Pathom United | (Thailand) Panuwat Sasomsap | (Thailand) Phayong Khunnaen | (Thailand) Anon Sangsanoi | (Thailand) Wutthisak Maneesook |
| Nongbua Pitchaya | (Thailand) Chatchai Paholpat | (Thailand) Theerawekin Seehawong | (Thailand) Jakkapong Somboon | (Brazil) Victor Amaro |
| Prachuap | (Thailand) Seksan Muangchantaburi | (Thailand) Thawatchai Damrong-Ongtrakul | (Thailand) Adul Muensamaan | (Thailand) Sompob Nilwong |
| PTT Rayong | (Thailand) Kamonwan Wongwilai | (Thailand) Teerasak Po-on | (Thailand) Apipoo Suntornpanavech | (Thailand) Arthit Sunthornpit |
| Rayong | (Thailand) Pramot Chanthamit | (Thailand) Songyot Klinsrisuk | (Thailand) Nantapol Supathai | (Thailand) Anuchit Ngrnbukkol |
| Samut Songkhram | (Italy) Nicolas Rognoni | (Thailand) Vimol Jankam | (Thailand) Peeratat Phoruendee | (Thailand) Trakoolchat Thongbai |
| Songkhla United | (Thailand) Watchara Tochanakan | (Thailand) Wasan Sangkhaphan (Until May 2017) (Thailand) Nopphorn Ekasatra (Since May 2017) | (Thailand) Yuttana Chaikaew | (Thailand) Jakapong Yaito |
| Trat | (Thailand) Manas Chalalai | (Thailand) Somkiat Fongpech (Until June 2017) (Thailand) Worakorn Wichanarong (Since June 2017) | (Thailand) Pornpreecha Jarunai | (Thailand) Sittichai Masbu-ngor |

=== Foreign players ===
| Other foreign players. |
| AFC quota players. |
| ASEAN quota players. |
| No foreign player registered. |

The number of foreign players is restricted to five per T2 team. A team can use five foreign players on the field in each game, including at least one player from the AFC member countries and one player from nine countries member of ASEAN (3+1+1).

Note : BBCU had withdrawn since 29 April 2017. So they had registered their players only first leg.
(substituted off) : players who released during summer transfer window;
(substituted in) : players who registered during summer transfer window.
↔: players who have dual nationality by half-caste or naturalization.

| Club | Leg | Player 1 | Player 2 | Player 3 | Player 4 | Player 5 |
|---|---|---|---|---|---|---|
| Air Force Central | First | (Montenegro) Petar Vukčević (substituted off) | (Brazil) Valdo | (Croatia) Aleksandar Kapisoda | (Japan) Kazumichi Takagi | (New Zealand) ↔ (Japan) Kayne Vincent |
| Air Force Central | Second | (Brazil) Bruno Correa (substituted in) | (Brazil) Valdo | (Croatia) Aleksandar Kapisoda | (Japan) Kazumichi Takagi | (New Zealand) ↔ (Japan) Kayne Vincent |
| Angthong | First | (Ivory Coast) Bernard Doumbia | (Ivory Coast) Marc Landry Babo | (Ghana) Isaac Honny | (Japan) Terukazu Tanaka | (Germany) ↔ (Philippines) Mike Ott |
| Angthong | Second | (Ivory Coast) Bernard Doumbia | (Ivory Coast) Marc Landry Babo | (Ghana) Isaac Honny | (Japan) Terukazu Tanaka | (Germany) ↔ (Philippines) Mike Ott |
| Army United | First | (Netherlands) Melvin de Leeuw (substituted off) | (Japan) Kai Hirano (substituted off) | (Brazil) Marcos Vinícius | (Brazil) Rodrigo Frauches | (Slovakia) Zdenko Kaprálik |
| Army United | Second | (Brazil) Diego (substituted in) | (Iran) Milad Zeneyedpour (substituted in) | (Brazil) Marcos Vinícius | (Brazil) Rodrigo Frauches | (Slovakia) Zdenko Kaprálik |
| Bangkok | First | (Brazil) Diego (substituted off) | (Brazil) João Paulo | (Cameroon) Theodore Yuyun | (Japan) Satoshi Nagano | (South Korea) Yoo Jae-ho |
| Bangkok | Second | (Ivory Coast) Kouassi Yao Hermann (substituted in) | (Brazil) João Paulo | (Cameroon) Theodore Yuyun | (Japan) Satoshi Nagano | (South Korea) Yoo Jae-ho |
| BBCU | First | (Brazil) André Araújo (substituted off) | (France) Romain Gasmi (substituted off) | (South Korea) Ryu Beom-hee (substituted off) | (South Korea) Ma Sang-hoon (substituted off) | (Singapore) Hafiz Abu Sujad (substituted off) |
| BBCU | Second | Dissolved during season | | | | |
| Chainat Hornbill | First | (Uzbekistan) Javlon Guseynov (substituted off) | (Uruguay) Diego Silva | (France) Sinama Pongolle | (South Korea) Park Jong-oh | (Afghanistan) Mustafa Azadzoy |
| Chainat Hornbill | Second | (Spain) Gorka Unda (substituted in) | (Uruguay) Diego Silva | (France) Sinama Pongolle | (South Korea) Park Jong-oh | (Afghanistan) Mustafa Azadzoy |
| Chiangmai | First | (Ivory Coast) Kouassi Yao Hermann (substituted off) | (South Korea) Jo Tae-keun (substituted off) | (Brazil) Wellington Bruno | (Costa Rica) Yendrick Ruiz | (North Macedonia) Hristijan Kirovski |
| Chiangmai | Second | (South Korea) Kim Hyo-jin (substituted in) | (South Korea) Jung Dae-sun (substituted in) | (Brazil) Wellington Bruno | (Costa Rica) Yendrick Ruiz | (North Macedonia) Hristijan Kirovski |
| Kasetsart | First | (Brazil) Daniel Melo (substituted off) | (South Korea) Noh Hyeong-cheol (substituted off) | (Brazil) Jonatan Reis | (Ivory Coast) Aboubacar Sidiki Koné | (Brazil) ↔ (Vietnam) Kesley Alves |
| Kasetsart | Second | (Brazil) Tiago Chulapa (substituted in) | (South Korea) Kim Chan-young (substituted in) | (Brazil) Jonatan Reis | (Ivory Coast) Aboubacar Sidiki Koné | (Brazil) ↔ (Vietnam) Kesley Alves |
| Krabi | First | (Namibia) Tangeni Shipahu (substituted off) | (France) ↔ (Cambodia) Thierry Bin (substituted off) | (Ivory Coast) Koné Seydou | (Cameroon) Isaac Mbengan | (Japan) Ryohei Maeda |
| Krabi | Second | (Brazil) Aron da Silva (substituted in) | (Brazil) Almir (substituted in) | (Ivory Coast) Koné Seydou | (Cameroon) Isaac Mbengan | (Japan) Ryohei Maeda |
| Lampang | First | (Japan) Ito Kohei (substituted off) | (Japan) Ryuki Kozawa (substituted off) | (Brazil) Pedro Paulo | (Brazil) David Bala | (Morocco) El Mehdi Sidqy |
| Lampang | Second | (Netherlands) Melvin de Leeuw (substituted in) | (Japan) Kai Hirano (substituted in) | (Brazil) Pedro Paulo | (Brazil) David Bala | (Morocco) El Mehdi Sidqy |
| Nakhon Pathom United | First | (Argentina) Gaston Castaño (substituted off) | (Morocco) Youssef Adnane (substituted off) | (Ivory Coast) Henri Jöel | (Ghana) Lesley Ablorh | (Japan) Yuki Bamba |
| Nakhon Pathom United | Second | (Cameroon) Berlin Ndebe-Nlome (substituted in) | (England) Evenson James (substituted in) | (Ivory Coast) Henri Jöel | (Ghana) Lesley Ablorh | (Japan) Yuki Bamba |
| Nongbua Pitchaya | First | (Brazil) Nelisson (substituted off) | (Chile) Ramsés Bustos (substituted off) | (Brazil) Andrey Coutinho | (Brazil) Victor Amaro | (South Korea) Dai Min-joo |
| Nongbua Pitchaya | Second | (Brazil) Jardel Capistrano (substituted in) | (Japan) Masaya Jitozono (substituted in) | (Brazil) Andrey Coutinho | (Brazil) Victor Amaro | (South Korea) Dai Min-joo |
| PT Prachuap | First | (Montenegro) Aleksandar Vujačić (substituted off) | (Brazil) Neto | (Brazil) Laércio | (Brazil) Willen Mota | (South Korea) Kwon Dae-hee |
| PT Prachuap | Second | (Japan) Yusei Ogasawara (substituted in) | (Brazil) Neto | (Brazil) Laércio | (Brazil) Willen Mota | (South Korea) Kwon Dae-hee |
| PTT Rayong | First | (Brazil) Leandro Tatu (substituted off) | (Brazil) Dennis Murillo | (Ivory Coast) Amadou Ouattara | (Japan) Kazuki Murakami | (South Korea) Woo Geun-jeong |
| PTT Rayong | Second | (France) Anthony Moura (substituted in) | (Brazil) Dennis Murillo | (Ivory Coast) Amadou Ouattara | (Japan) Kazuki Murakami | (South Korea) Woo Geun-jeong |
| Rayong | First | (Paraguay) Anggello Machuca (substituted off) | (Brazil) Harrison Cardoso | (Cameroon) David Bayiha | (Japan) Seiya Sugishita | (Iran) Saeid Salarzadeh |
| Rayong | Second | (Montenegro) Ivan Bošković (substituted in) | (Brazil) Harrison Cardoso | (Cameroon) David Bayiha | (Japan) Seiya Sugishita | (Iran) Saeid Salarzadeh |
| Samut Songkhram | First | (Cameroon) Berlin Ndebe-Nlome (substituted off) | (Japan) Yuya Wada (substituted off) | (Brazil) Thiago Santos | (Madagascar) Olivier Razafindramboa | (Togo) Andre Houma |
| Samut Songkhram | Second | (Brazil) André Araújo (substituted in) | (South Korea) Kim Moon-ju (substituted in) | (Brazil) Thiago Santos | (Madagascar) Olivier Razafindramboa | (Togo) Andre Houma |
| Songkhla United | First | (Spain) Gorka Unda (substituted off) | (Spain) Francis Suárez | (Cape Verde) David Silva | (Georgia (country)) Giorgi Tsimakuridze | (South Korea) Whoo Hyun |
| Songkhla United | Second | (Brazil) Diego Lima (substituted in) | (Spain) Francis Suárez | (Cape Verde) David Silva | (Georgia (country)) Giorgi Tsimakuridze | (South Korea) Whoo Hyun |
| Trat | First | (Brazil) Caio (substituted off) | (Zambia) Noah Chivuta (substituted off) | (Brazil) Erivaldo | (Brazil) Barros Tardeli | (South Korea) Yoon Si-ho |
| Trat | Second | (Brazil) Felipe Ferreira (substituted in) | (Brazil) Douglas Cobo (substituted in) | (Brazil) Erivaldo | (Brazil) Barros Tardeli | (South Korea) Yoon Si-ho |

== League table ==
=== Standings ===
| Pos | Team | Pld | W | D | L | GF | GA | GD | Pts | Qualification or relegation |
|---|---|---|---|---|---|---|---|---|---|---|
| 1 | Chainat Hornbill (C, P) | 32 | 20 | 7 | 5 | 64 | 40 | +24 | 67 | Promotion to 2018 Thai League |
| 2 | Air Force Central (P) | 32 | 18 | 8 | 6 | 61 | 40 | +21 | 62 | Promotion to 2018 Thai League |
| 3 | Prachuap (P) | 32 | 18 | 5 | 9 | 58 | 40 | +18 | 59 | Promotion to 2018 Thai League |
| 4 | Angthong | 32 | 15 | 8 | 9 | 65 | 46 | +19 | 53 | |
| 5 | PTT Rayong | 32 | 14 | 8 | 10 | 54 | 50 | +4 | 50 | |
| 6 | Lampang | 32 | 13 | 8 | 11 | 45 | 47 | −2 | 47 | |
| 7 | Nakhon Pathom United (R) | 32 | 10 | 12 | 10 | 43 | 38 | +5 | 42 | Relegation to 2018 Thai League 4 (Note: Nakhon Pathom United and Samut Songkhram administratively relegated to 2018 Thai League 4 by FA Thailand because they did not send documents about club licensing in time.) |
| 8 | Nongbua Pitchaya | 32 | 10 | 11 | 11 | 45 | 47 | −2 | 41 | |
| 9 | Army United | 32 | 10 | 9 | 13 | 53 | 57 | −4 | 39 (Note: Army United ahead on head-to-head record; Army United 6 pts, Chiangmai 0 pts.) | |
| 10 | Chiangmai | 32 | 12 | 3 | 17 | 46 | 52 | −6 | 39 | |
| 11 | Rayong | 32 | 10 | 8 | 14 | 55 | 56 | −1 | 38 (Note: Krabi ahead on head-to-head record; Krabi 3 pts and Rayong 3 pts were equivalent. Rayong ahead on overall goals difference; Krabi -12 and Rayong -1.) | |
| 12 | Krabi | 32 | 10 | 8 | 14 | 50 | 62 | −12 | 38 | |
| 13 | Kasetsart | 32 | 8 | 13 | 11 | 61 | 72 | −11 | 37 | |
| 14 | Samut Songkhram (R) | 32 | 9 | 8 | 15 | 42 | 57 | −15 | 35 | Relegation to 2018 Thai League 4 |
| 15 | Trat (Note: Trat was docked 3 points due to decision of FIFA about dispute between Trat and Norohiro Kawakami.) | 32 | 9 | 10 | 13 | 49 | 59 | −10 | 34 (Note: Trat ahead on head-to-head record; Trat 4 pts, Songkhla United 1 pt.) | |
| 16 | Songkhla United (R) | 32 | 9 | 7 | 16 | 38 | 49 | −11 | 34 | Relegation to 2018 Thai League 3 |
| 17 | Bangkok (R) | 32 | 8 | 5 | 19 | 47 | 64 | −17 | 29 | Relegation to 2018 Thai League 3 |
| 18 | BBCU | 0 | 0 | 0 | 0 | 0 | 0 | 0 | 0 | Dissolved team |

Updated to match(es) played on 21 October 2017. Source: Thai League 2
Rules for classification: 1) Points; 2) Head-to-head points; 3) Head-to-head goals difference; 4) Head-to-head goals scored; 5) Overall goals difference; 6) Overall goals scored; 7) Fair play points; 8) Play-off without extra time;).
(C) Champions; (P) Promoted; (R) Relegated

=== Positions by round ===
| Leader and promotion to the 2018 Thai League. |
| Promotion to the 2018 Thai League. |
| Relegation to the 2018 Thai League 3. |
| Relegation to the 2018 Thai League 4. |
| Last position by withdrawal. |

The table lists the positions of teams after each week of matches. In order to preserve chronological evolvements, any postponed matches are not included in the round at which they were originally scheduled, but added to the full round they were played immediately afterwards. For example, if a match is scheduled for matchday 13, but then postponed and played between days 16 and 17, it will be added to the standings for day 16.

| Team \ Round | 1 | 2 | 3 | 4 | 5 | 6 | 7 | 8 | 9 | 10 | 11 | 12 | 13 | 14 | 15 | 16 | 17 | 18 | 19 | 20 | 21 | 22 | 23 | 24 | 25 | 26 | 27 | 28 | 29 | 30 | 31 | 32 | 33 | 34 |
|---|---|---|---|---|---|---|---|---|---|---|---|---|---|---|---|---|---|---|---|---|---|---|---|---|---|---|---|---|---|---|---|---|---|---|
| Chainat Hornbill | 2 | 3 | 5 | 5 | 3 | 1 | 1 | 1 | 3 | 3 | 3 | 3 | 7 | 5 | 3 | 2 | 3 | 3 | 2 | 1 | 1 | 1 | 2 | 2 | 2 | 2 | 2 | 2 | 2 | 1 | 1 | 1 | 1 | 1 |
| Air Force Central | 1 | 1 | 2 | 1 | 4 | 4 | 5 | 5 | 6 | 6 | 6 | 7 | 6 | 7 | 7 | 5 | 5 | 4 | 4 | 4 | 2 | 2 | 1 | 1 | 1 | 1 | 1 | 1 | 1 | 2 | 2 | 2 | 2 | 2 |
| Prachuap | 6 | 2 | 1 | 4 | 1 | 2 | 3 | 4 | 4 | 5 | 4 | 5 | 2 | 4 | 2 | 1 | 2 | 2 | 1 | 3 | 4 | 3 | 3 | 3 | 3 | 3 | 3 | 3 | 3 | 3 | 3 | 3 | 3 | 3 |
| Angthong | 10 | 11 | 6 | 6 | 6 | 8 | 6 | 6 | 5 | 4 | 5 | 4 | 4 | 3 | 5 | 6 | 4 | 5 | 5 | 5 | 5 | 5 | 5 | 4 | 5 | 5 | 4 | 4 | 4 | 4 | 4 | 4 | 4 | 4 |
| PTT Rayong | 3 | 4 | 3 | 2 | 5 | 5 | 2 | 3 | 2 | 2 | 1 | 1 | 1 | 1 | 1 | 3 | 1 | 1 | 3 | 2 | 3 | 4 | 4 | 5 | 4 | 4 | 5 | 5 | 5 | 5 | 5 | 5 | 5 | 5 |
| Lampang | 5 | 8 | 4 | 3 | 2 | 3 | 4 | 2 | 1 | 1 | 2 | 2 | 3 | 2 | 4 | 4 | 6 | 6 | 6 | 6 | 6 | 6 | 6 | 6 | 6 | 6 | 6 | 6 | 6 | 6 | 6 | 6 | 6 | 6 |
| Nakhon Pathom United | 11 | 12 | 15 | 7 | 9 | 9 | 10 | 12 | 9 | 7 | 9 | 8 | 8 | 10 | 11 | 9 | 8 | 7 | 9 | 8 | 7 | 9 | 11 | 10 | 10 | 10 | 7 | 7 | 7 | 7 | 7 | 7 | 7 | 7 |
| Nongbua Pitchaya | 9 | 16 | 17 | 10 | 10 | 11 | 14 | 10 | 12 | 14 | 14 | 14 | 11 | 12 | 13 | 14 | 12 | 14 | 11 | 9 | 9 | 11 | 8 | 9 | 7 | 7 | 8 | 9 | 11 | 11 | 9 | 8 | 11 | 8 |
| Army United | 12 | 17 | 12 | 15 | 12 | 13 | 13 | 15 | 11 | 8 | 11 | 9 | 10 | 8 | 9 | 11 | 10 | 10 | 12 | 12 | 13 | 13 | 14 | 14 | 13 | 11 | 9 | 10 | 10 | 10 | 10 | 9 | 8 | 9 |
| Chiangmai | 16 | 9 | 13 | 13 | 7 | 6 | 7 | 9 | 10 | 11 | 10 | 10 | 12 | 11 | 8 | 10 | 9 | 9 | 7 | 7 | 8 | 7 | 7 | 8 | 9 | 8 | 12 | 8 | 8 | 9 | 11 | 11 | 9 | 10 |
| Krabi | 4 | 5 | 9 | 12 | 16 | 16 | 12 | 14 | 15 | 16 | 15 | 15 | 16 | 13 | 14 | 15 | 13 | 13 | 10 | 11 | 11 | 8 | 10 | 11 | 12 | 12 | 11 | 12 | 9 | 13 | 13 | 14 | 13 | 11 |
| Rayong | 7 | 6 | 11 | 14 | 8 | 7 | 8 | 7 | 7 | 9 | 7 | 6 | 5 | 6 | 6 | 7 | 7 | 8 | 8 | 10 | 10 | 12 | 9 | 7 | 8 | 9 | 10 | 11 | 12 | 8 | 8 | 10 | 10 | 12 |
| Kasetsart | 17 | 18 | 18 | 17 | 17 | 17 | 17 | 18 | 18 | 18 | 18 | 18 | 18 | 18 | 18 | 18 | 17 | 17 | 17 | 15 | 14 | 14 | 13 | 12 | 11 | 13 | 14 | 14 | 13 | 12 | 12 | 13 | 12 | 13 |
| Samut Songkhram | 13 | 14 | 14 | 16 | 13 | 14 | 9 | 8 | 8 | 10 | 8 | 11 | 9 | 9 | 10 | 8 | 11 | 11 | 13 | 13 | 12 | 10 | 12 | 13 | 14 | 14 | 15 | 13 | 15 | 15 | 15 | 16 | 16 | 14 |
| Trat | 18 | 10 | 10 | 8 | 11 | 12 | 15 | 16 | 14 | 15 | 12 | 13 | 13 | 14 | 15 | 13 | 15 | 15 | 16 | 17 | 15 | 16 | 17 | 16 | 16 | 16 | 16 | 16 | 16 | 16 | 16 | 15 | 14 | 15 |
| Songkhla United | 14 | 15 | 8 | 11 | 14 | 15 | 16 | 11 | 13 | 13 | 16 | 12 | 14 | 15 | 12 | 12 | 14 | 12 | 14 | 14 | 16 | 15 | 16 | 15 | 15 | 15 | 13 | 15 | 14 | 14 | 14 | 12 | 15 | 16 |
| Bangkok | 8 | 13 | 16 | 18 | 18 | 18 | 18 | 17 | 17 | 17 | 17 | 17 | 17 | 17 | 17 | 17 | 16 | 16 | 15 | 16 | 17 | 17 | 15 | 17 | 17 | 17 | 17 | 17 | 17 | 17 | 17 | 17 | 17 | 17 |
| BBCU | 15 | 7 | 7 | 9 | 15 | 10 | 11 | 13 | 16 | 12 | 13 | 16 | 15 | 16 | 16 | 16 | 18 | 18 | 18 | 18 | 18 | 18 | 18 | 18 | 18 | 18 | 18 | 18 | 18 | 18 | 18 | 18 | 18 | 18 |

Source: Thai League 2

Note:

Position of each teams and league table had changed by cut results against BBCU out, because BBCU had withdrawn and they had putted to last position since 23 May 2017 by decision of FA Thailand.
Nakhon Pathom United and Samut Songkhram administratively relegated to Thai League 4 by the FA Thailand. Because they cannot send documents about club licensing in time.

=== Results ===
| Home \ Away | AFC | ANG | AMU | BKK | BBC | CHIH | CMI | KST | KBI | LAM | NPU | NBP | PCH | PTT | RYG | SSKH | SKHU | TRT |
|---|---|---|---|---|---|---|---|---|---|---|---|---|---|---|---|---|---|---|
| Air Force Central | | 1–0 | 5–0 | 1–0 | | 0–2 | 2–1 | 6–2 | 1–1 | 1–0 | 2–2 | 2–2 | 1–0 | 1–1 | 2–1 | 2–1 | 3–2 | 5–1 |
| Angthong | 2–1 | | 4–4 | 4–1 | | 3–0 | 2–1 | 6–2 | 4–2 | 3–2 | 2–1 | 2–1 | 4–3 | 1–1 | 2–3 | 3–1 | 1–1 | 3–3 |
| Army United | 0–0 | 1–4 | | 1–0 | | 2–2 | 2–0 | 1–1 | 1–2 | 1–1 | 2–1 | 1–2 | 2–3 | 2–1 | 5–1 | 3–0 | 1–0 | 6–2 |
| Bangkok | 1–2 | 0–5 | 1–0 | | | 1–2 | 1–2 | 1–2 | 3–3 | 2–0 | 1–1 | 1–2 | 3–1 | 1–2 | 2–1 | 2–1 | 3–0 | 2–1 |
| BBCU | | | | | | | | | | | | | | | | | | |
| Chainat Hornbill | 3–1 | 2–1 | 1–1 | 3–1 | | | 4–1 | 3–1 | 4–1 | 1–0 | 2–0 | 4–0 | 2–0 | 4–2 | 3–4 | 2–1 | 3–2 | 1–1 |
| Chiangmai | 3–0 | 2–0 | 0–2 | 4–2 | | 1–2 | | 2–0 | 0–0 | 3–1 | 1–1 | 1–3 | 1–3 | 2–1 | 2–1 | 4–0 | 0–1 | 5–0 |
| Kasetsart | 1–1 | 0–2 | 3–1 | 2–2 | | 4–2 | 3–2 | | 4–5 | 1–1 | 0–3 | 3–3 | 1–1 | 2–2 | 3–2 | 3–1 | 2–2 | 4–2 |
| Krabi | 0–3 | 2–1 | 3–1 | 1–5 | | 1–1 | 1–2 | 4–3 | | 2–3 | 0–0 | 1–0 | 1–3 | 0–1 | 5–2 | 2–2 | 2–1 | 2–1 |
| Lampang | 1–1 | 2–1 | 1–1 | 1–0 | | 0–1 | 2–1 | 5–3 | 3–2 | | 1–0 | 1–1 | 1–0 | 3–2 | 3–3 | 2–1 | 2–1 | 1–1 |
| Nakhon Pathom United | 2–3 | 0–0 | 3–0 | 3–1 | | 1–1 | 3–1 | 0–0 | 2–2 | 1–1 | | 0–0 | 1–2 | 4–2 | 1–0 | 2–1 | 4–1 | 2–1 |
| Nongbua Pitchaya | 1–1 | 1–1 | 3–1 | 1–1 | | 3–0 | 0–1 | 0–0 | 2–1 | 1–2 | 1–1 | | 1–0 | 1–3 | 3–1 | 2–1 | 2–1 | 0–0 |
| Prachuap | 2–1 | 0–1 | 2–1 | 4–1 | | 3–0 | 2–1 | 2–2 | 0–1 | 4–2 | 1–0 | 3–2 | | 0–0 | 1–1 | 7–2 | 1–0 | 2–1 |
| PTT Rayong | 2–3 | 2–0 | 1–0 | 4–3 | | 2–2 | 1–0 | 4–1 | 3–2 | 1–0 | 3–1 | 1–0 | 1–3 | | 1–4 | 2–2 | 2–1 | 3–2 |
| Rayong | 1–2 | 2–2 | 2–2 | 0–0 | | 0–2 | 5–0 | 3–1 | 2–0 | 4–1 | 0–1 | 2–2 | 2–0 | 2–2 | | 2–1 | 0–0 | 0–2 |
| Samut Songkhram | 3–2 | 2–0 | 2–3 | 3–1 | | 1–1 | 0–0 | 2–2 | 1–0 | 1–0 | 2–1 | 3–1 | 1–1 | 1–0 | 0–3 | | 1–1 | 2–0 |
| Songkhla United | 1–2 | 1–0 | 3–3 | 3–2 | | 1–2 | 3–1 | 0–4 | 1–1 | 0–1 | 4–1 | 1–0 | 1–2 | 2–1 | 1–0 | 2–1 | | 0–0 |
| Trat | 1–3 | 1–1 | 3–2 | 4–2 | | 0–2 | 4–1 | 1–1 | 2–0 | 2–1 | 0–0 | 6–4 | 1–2 | 0–0 | 4–1 | 1–1 | 1–0 | |

Updated to match(es) played on 21 October 2017. Source: Thai League 2
Legend: Blue = home team win; Yellow = draw; Red = away team win.

== Season statistics ==
=== Top scorers ===
As of 21 October 2017.

| Rank | Player | Club | Goals |
|---|---|---|---|
| 1 | (Brazil) Jonatan Reis | Kasetsart | 28 |
| 2 | (Brazil) João Paulo | Bangkok | 23 |
| 2 | (Thailand) Supot Jodjam | Krabi | 23 |
| 4 | (Brazil) David Bala | Lampang | 18 |
| 4 | (Brazil) Dennis Murillo | PTT Rayong | 18 |
| 4 | (Brazil) Marcos Vinícius | Army United | 18 |
| 4 | (Brazil) Barros Tardeli | Trat | 18 |
| 8 | (Brazil) Willen | Prachuap | 17 |
| 9 | (Ivory Coast) Bernard Doumbia | Angthong | 16 |
| 10 | (Cameroon) Berlin Ndebe-Nlome | Samut Songkhram (12), Nakhon Pathom United (2) | 14 |
| 10 | (Brazil) Harrison Cardoso | Rayong | 14 |
| 10 | (Brazil) Erivaldo Oliveira | Trat | 14 |
| 10 | (France) Sinama Pongolle | Chainat Hornbill | 14 |

=== Hat-tricks ===
| Player | For | Against | Result | Date |
|---|---|---|---|---|
| (Brazil) Dennis Murillo | PTT Rayong | Kasetsart | 4–1 | 11 February 2017 |
| (North Macedonia) Hristijan Kirovski^{5} | Chiangmai | Trat | 5–0 | 8 March 2017 |
| (Cameroon) Berlin Ndebe-Nlome | Samut Songkhram | Bangkok | 3–1 | 19 March 2017 |
| (Thailand) Supot Jodjam | Krabi | Kasetsart | 4–3 | 18 April 2017 |
| (Brazil) Barros Tardeli | Trat | Army United | 3–2 | 18 April 2017 |
| (Brazil) David Bala | Lampang | PTT Rayong | 3–2 | 13 May 2017 |
| (Ivory Coast) Bernard Doumbia | Angthong | Bangkok | 4–1 | 14 May 2017 |
| (Brazil) João Paulo | Bangkok | Krabi | 3–3 | 17 May 2017 |
| (Brazil) Willen Mota | Prachuap | Bangkok | 4–1 | 20 May 2017 |
| (Cameroon) Berlin Ndebe-Nlome | Samut Songkhram | Nongbua Pitchaya | 3–1 | 21 May 2017 |
| (Netherlands) Melvin de Leeuw | Lampang | Krabi | 3–2 | 6 August 2017 |
| (Thailand) Tanakorn Dangthong | Army United | Trat | 6–2 | 6 September 2017 |
| (Brazil) Jonatan Reis | Kasetsart | Krabi | 4–5 | 6 September 2017 |
| (Thailand) Supot Jodjam | Krabi | Kasetsart | 5–4 | 6 September 2017 |
| (Brazil) Willen Mota | Prachuap | Samut Songkhram | 7–2 | 20 September 2017 |
| (Japan) Yuki Bamba | Nakhon Pathom United | PTT Rayong | 4–2 | 15 October 2017 |
| (Brazil) Erivaldo Oliveira | Trat | Nongbua Pitchaya | 6–4 | 15 October 2017 |
| (Brazil) Barros Tardeli | Trat | Nongbua Pitchaya | 6–4 | 15 October 2017 |

== Attendances ==
=== Overall statistical table ===
| Pos | Team | Total | High | Low | Average | Change |
|---|---|---|---|---|---|---|
| 1 | Air Force Central | 61,826 | 4,489 | 1,896 | 3,636 | +42.6% |
| 2 | Chiangmai | 45,101 | 4,170 | 1,532 | 2,653 | −38.1% |
| 3 | Nongbua Pitchaya | 31,891 | 2,484 | 1,360 | 1,875 | n/a^{†} |
| 4 | PTT Rayong | 31,500 | 3,735 | 631 | 1,852 | +6.2% |
| 5 | Lampang | 25,974 | 2,807 | 1,020 | 1,623 | +16.3% |
| 6 | Rayong | 25,363 | 2,630 | 507 | 1,585 | +34.8% |
| 7 | Prachuap | 23,193 | 2,954 | 800 | 1,449 | +30.8% |
| 8 | Chainat Hornbill | 23,373 | 2,129 | 1,012 | 1,374 | −22.2% |
| 9 | Songkhla United | 18,420 | 1,560 | 960 | 1,151 | −20.9% |
| 10 | Angthong | 17,834 | 1,609 | 538 | 1,114 | −50.9% |
| 11 | Nakhon Pathom United | 17,448 | 1,535 | 803 | 1,090 | +15.1% |
| 12 | Trat | 16,472 | 1,627 | 501 | 968 | n/a^{†} |
| 13 | BBCU | 3,959 | 896 | 726 | 791 | −48.6% |
| 14 | Army United | 11,496 | 1,261 | 374 | 718 | −68.7% |
| 15 | Kasetsart | 11,095 | 1,052 | 420 | 693 | n/a^{†} |
| 16 | Krabi | 10,705 | 1,103 | 361 | 669 | −25.5% |
| 17 | Bangkok | 10,004 | 1,824 | 170 | 625 | −66.4% |
| 18 | Samut Songkhram | 9,556 | 1,063 | 290 | 597 | −19.4% |
| | League total | 395,210 | 4,489 | 170 | 1,396 | −36.3% |

Updated to games played on 21 October 2017
Source: Thai League 2
Notes:
^{†} Teams played previous season in Division 2

=== Attendances by home match played ===
| Date | Matches each team against BBCU since 29 April 2017. |

Since 29 April 2017 BBCU had withdrawn. But statistics of attendances are continue counting.

| Team \ Match played | 1 | 2 | 3 | 4 | 5 | 6 | 7 | 8 | 9 | 10 | 11 | 12 | 13 | 14 | 15 | 16 | 17 | Total |
|---|---|---|---|---|---|---|---|---|---|---|---|---|---|---|---|---|---|---|
| Air Force Central | 3,890 | 3,975 | 3,989 | 4,170 | 3,620 | 3,753 | 3,944 | 4,062 | 2,356 | 3,463 | 3,116 | 1,896 | 3,489 | 4,335 | 4,056 | 3,223 | 4,489 | 61,826 |
| Angthong | 1,609 | 1,419 | 954 | 1,276 | 1,575 | 853 | 1,017 | 1,196 | 1,145 | 981 | 1,230 | 1,152 | 897 | 1,233 | 24 Sep | 759 | 538 | 17,834 |
| Army United | 812 | 858 | 1,261 | 815 | 737 | 800 | 557 | 374 | 712 | 648 | 645 | 767 | 656 | 602 | 17 Sep | 742 | 510 | 11,496 |
| Bangkok | 1,824 | 1,032 | 1,040 | 705 | 384 | 574 | 863 | 405 | 440 | 320 | 280 | 270 | 3 Sep | 457 | 170 | 627 | 613 | 10,004 |
| BBCU | 896 | 823 | 765 | 726 | 749 | 7 May | 17 May | 28 May | 11 Jun | 18 Jun | 2 Jul | 9 Jul | 6 Aug | 6 Sep | 9 Sep | 20 Sep | 8 Oct | 3,959 |
| Chainat Hornbill | 2,129 | 1,689 | 1,479 | 1,224 | 1,500 | 1,490 | 1,080 | 1,436 | 1,183 | 1,390 | 1,197 | 1,198 | 1,049 | 1,209 | 1,074 | 1,012 | 2,034 | 23,373 |
| Chiangmai | 4,170 | 3,227 | 3,972 | 3,534 | 2,567 | 3,319 | 2,595 | 3,525 | 1,780 | 2,335 | 2,257 | 2,125 | 1,812 | 1,532 | 1,624 | 2,518 | 2,209 | 45,101 |
| Kasetsart | 520 | 820 | 780 | 920 | 530 | 940 | 822 | 720 | 640 | 420 | 5 Jul | 520 | 570 | 420 | 779 | 1,052 | 642 | 11,095 |
| Krabi | 1,103 | 965 | 671 | 667 | 458 | 584 | 552 | 20 May | 536 | 571 | 927 | 614 | 568 | 403 | 361 | 675 | 1,050 | 10,705 |
| Lampang | 1,441 | 1,500 | 1,188 | 1,542 | 1,365 | 1,676 | 1,870 | 2,104 | 1,570 | 2,807 | 2,095 | 25 Jun | 2,137 | 1,288 | 1,020 | 1,283 | 1,088 | 25,974 |
| Nakhon Pathom United | 1,220 | 1,500 | 825 | 1,232 | 832 | 830 | 14 May | 1,139 | 1,069 | 1,102 | 1,200 | 1,132 | 827 | 803 | 1,002 | 1,200 | 1,535 | 17,448 |
| Nongbua Pitchaya | 2,275 | 2,391 | 1,516 | 1,736 | 1,850 | 2,484 | 1,644 | 1,394 | 1,700 | 1,746 | 2,100 | 2,259 | 1,877 | 1,891 | 1,999 | 1,360 | 1,669 | 31,891 |
| Prachuap | 800 | 1,520 | 1,705 | 1,200 | 1,885 | 1,095 | 1,057 | 1,097 | 1,536 | 1,567 | 1,550 | 1,422 | 1,366 | 949 | 1,490 | 15 Oct | 2,954 | 23,193 |
| PTT Rayong | 2,093 | 1,764 | 1,556 | 1,835 | 2,515 | 1,968 | 2,100 | 631 | 2,114 | 2,016 | 2,085 | 1,292 | 3,735 | 1,933 | 1,623 | 1,018 | 1,222 | 31,500 |
| Rayong | 1,292 | 1,647 | 1,860 | 2,630 | 1,980 | 2,360 | 2,183 | 1,297 | 1,583 | 1,385 | 1,483 | 1,680 | 1,830 | 800 | 507 | 846 | 21 Oct | 25,363 |
| Samut Songkhram | 1,063 | 913 | 494 | 691 | 767 | 672 | 586 | 530 | 483 | 557 | 342 | 30 Jul | 475 | 513 | 290 | 290 | 890 | 9,556 |
| Songkhla United | 1,160 | 1,350 | 1,160 | 1,056 | 1,115 | 29 Apr | 960 | 1,056 | 1,018 | 1,215 | 1,008 | 1,108 | 1,560 | 1,112 | 1,236 | 1,160 | 1,146 | 18,420 |
| Trat | 1,181 | 1,129 | 839 | 881 | 1,150 | 1,035 | 625 | 768 | 1,025 | 1,592 | 1,155 | 1,627 | 501 | 565 | 528 | 920 | 951 | 16,472 |

Source: Thai League 2

== See also ==
- 2017 Thai League
- 2017 Thai League 3
- 2017 Thai League 4
- 2017 Thailand Amateur League
- 2017 Thai FA Cup
- 2017 Thai League Cup
- 2017 Thailand Champions Cup
