= 2010 Chonburi F.C. season =

Chonburi
2010 season
- Chairman: Wittaya Khunpluem
- Head Coach: Jadet Meelarp
- Thai Premier League: 3rd
- Thai FA Cup: Winners
- Thai League Cup: Second round
- Queen's Cup: Semi-finals
- Top goalscorer: League: Pipob, Therdsak (10); All: Therdsak (16)
Home colours	Away colours	Third colours

The 2015 season is Chonburi's 5th season in the Thai Premier League of Chonburi Football Club.

== Team kit ==
The team kit for the 2010 season is produced by FBT and Chang Beer remain as the main sponsor.

Home colours	Away colours	Third colours

== Squad statistics ==
No.	Pos.	Name	League		FA Cup		League Cup		Queen's Cup		Total		Discipline	
No.	Pos.	Name	Apps	Goals	Apps	Goals	Apps	Goals	Apps	Goals	Apps	Goals	Yellow card	Red card
1	GK	(Thailand) Sujin Naknayom	0	0	0	0	0	0	0	0	0	0	0	0
2	DF	(Thailand) Suree Sukha	0	0	0	0	0	0	0	0	0	0	0	0
3	DF	(Thailand) Natthaphong Samana	0	0	0	0	0	0	0	0	0	0	0	0
4	DF	(Thailand) Kiatprawut Saiwaeo	0	0	0	0	0	0	0	0	0	0	0	0
5	MF	(Thailand) Phanuwat Jinta	0	0	0	0	0	0	0	0	0	0	0	0
6	DF	(Thailand) Suttinan Phuk-hom	0	0	0	0	0	0	0	0	0	0	0	0
7	MF	(Thailand) Arthit Sunthornpit	0	0	0	0	0	0	0	0	0	0	0	0
8	MF	(Thailand) Ekaphan Inthasen	0	0	0	0	0	0	0	0	0	0	0	0
9	FW	(Cameroon) Jules Baga	0	0	0	0	0	0	0	0	0	0	0	0
10	FW	(Thailand) Pipob On-Mo (c)	0	0	0	0	0	0	0	0	0	0	0	0
13	MF	(Thailand) Therdsak Chaiman (vc)	0	0	0	0	0	0	0	0	0	0	0	0
14	MF	(Cameroon) Ronald Kufoin	0	0	0	0	0	0	0	0	0	0	0	0
15	MF	(Thailand) Phuritad Jarikanon	0	0	0	0	0	0	0	0	0	0	0	0
16	FW	(Canada) Dave Simpson	0	0	0	0	0	0	0	0	0	0	0	0
17	MF	(Thailand) Kriangkrai Pimrat	0	0	0	0	0	0	0	0	0	0	0	0
18	GK	(Thailand) Sinthaweechai Hathairattanakool	0	0	0	0	0	0	0	0	0	0	0	0
19	MF	(Thailand) Adul Lahsoh	0	0	0	0	0	0	0	0	0	0	0	0
20	DF	(Thailand) Chawarit Kheawcha-oum	0	0	0	0	0	0	0	0	0	0	0	0
21	FW	(Thailand) Sukree Etae	0	0	0	0	0	0	0	0	0	0	0	0
22	FW	(Thailand) Rangsan Roobmoh	0	0	0	0	0	0	0	0	0	0	0	0
23	DF	(Thailand) Phaisan Pona	0	0	0	0	0	0	0	0	0	0	0	0
24	DF	(Nigeria) Kenneth Akpueze	0	0	0	0	0	0	0	0	0	0	0	0
25	DF	(Thailand) Chonlatit Jantakam	0	0	0	0	0	0	0	0	0	0	0	0
26	FW	(Cameroon) Berlin Ndebe-Nlome	0	0	0	0	0	0	0	0	0	0	0	0
28	GK	(Thailand) Hatsachai Sankla	0	0	0	0	0	0	0	0	0	0	0	0
29	DF	(Thailand) Jetsadakorn Hemdaeng	0	0	0	0	0	0	0	0	0	0	0	0
30	MF	(Thailand) Apisit Khuankwai	0	0	0	0	0	0	0	0	0	0	0	0
31	FW	(Thailand) Nurul Sriyankem	0	0	0	0	0	0	0	0	0	0	0	0
34	DF	(Thailand) Noppanon Kachaplayuk	0	0	0	0	0	0	0	0	0	0	0	0
37	DF	(Thailand) Adisorn Sap-So	0	0	0	0	0	0	0	0	0	0	0	0
38	FW	(Brazil) Ney Fabiano	0	0	0	0	0	0	0	0	0	0	0	0
39	MF	(Thailand) Suppasek Kaikaew	0	0	0	0	0	0	0	0	0	0	0	0
40	FW	(Thailand) Wanit Chaisan	0	0	0	0	0	0	0	0	0	0	0	0
—	MF	(Wales) Michael Byrne	0	0	0	0	0	0	0	0	0	0	0	0
—	FW	(Ivory Coast) Jean Benie	0	0	0	0	0	0	0	0	0	0	0	0
—	—	Own goals	–	–	–	–	–	–	–	–	–	–	–	–

== Transfers ==
=== In ===
Date	Pos.	Name	From
2010	MF	(Thailand) Therdsak Chaiman	Singapore Armed Forces
2010	MF	(Thailand) Suphasek Kaikaew	(Thailand) Bangkok United
2010	FW	(Cameroon) Jules Baga	(Ukraine) Zorya Luhansk
2010	MF	(Cameroon) Ronald Kufoin	Free agent
2010	GK	(Thailand) Hatsachai Sankla	(Thailand) Thai Airways-Look Isan
2010	FW	(Thailand) Sukree Etae	(Thailand) Narathiwat
2010	MF	(Nigeria) Kenneth Akpueze	Free agent
2010	FW	(Canada) Dave Simpson	(Sweden) Enköping
2010	FW	(Cameroon) Berlin Ndebe-Nlome	Free agent
2010	FW	(Brazil) Ney Fabiano	(Thailand) Bangkok Glass

- Total spending: ▼ ~ ฿0

=== Out ===
Date	Pos.	Name	To
2010	FW	(Brazil) Joílson	Free agent
2010	MF	(Thailand) Piyapol Bantao	(Thailand) Muangthong United
2010	FW	(Ivory Coast) Mohamed Koné	(Thailand) Muangthong United
2010	DF	(Japan) Yoshiaki Maruyama	(Thailand) Thai Port
2010	MF	(Wales) Michael Byrne	(Thailand) Bangkok Glass
2010	FW	(Ivory Coast) Jean Benie	(Thailand) Samut Songkhram

- Total income: ▲ ~ ฿3 million

=== Loans in ===
Date	Pos.	Name	From
2010	FW	(Thailand) Rangsan Roobmoh	(Thailand) Pattaya United

=== Loans out ===
Date	Pos.	Name	To
2009	FW	(Ivory Coast) Koné Mohamed	(Myanmar) Yangon United
2010	MF	(Thailand) Sarawut Janthapan	(Thailand) Chanthaburi
2010	MF	(Thailand) Teerasak Po-on	(Thailand) Chanthaburi
2010	MF	(Thailand) Attapong Nooprom	(Thailand) Sriracha

== Matches ==
=== Pre-season ===
8 December 2009	Chonburi	2 – 2	Đồng Tháp	Chonburi
16:00 UTC+7	Pipob 45'; Byrne 76'	(Report)	Văn Ngân 44'; Văn Mộc 62'	Stadium: IPE Chonburi Stadium

15 December 2009	Chonburi	1 – 0	Kelantan FA	Chonburi
16:00 UTC+7	Hattori 18'	(Report)		Stadium: IPE Chonburi Stadium

20 December 2009	Chonburi	1 – 2	Thai Port	Chonburi
18:00 UTC+7	Suphasek 75'	(Report)	Teerawut 72'; Sarayoot 82' (pen.)	Stadium: Sirindhorn Stadium

19 January 2010	Chonburi	1 – 2	Hyundai Dolphin	Chonburi
16:00 UTC+7	Pipob 58'	(Report)	J.M. Lee 25'; S.M. Kim 37'	Stadium: IPE Chonburi Stadium

21 January 2010	Chonburi	1 – 2	Narathiwat	Chonburi
16:00 UTC+7	Kaneung 82'	(Report)	Sudrimarn 27'; Hasan 87'	Stadium: IPE Chonburi Stadium

27 January 2010	Chonburi	1 – 3	Pattaya United	Chonburi
16:00 UTC+7

29 January 2010	Nakhon Ratchasima	0 – 3	Chonburi	Nakhon Ratchasima
16:00 UTC+7				Stadium: 80th Birthday Anniversary Stadium

31 January 2010	Nakhon Ratchasima	3 – 4	Chonburi	Nakhon Ratchasima
16:00 UTC+7		(Report)	Morita 54', 86'; Ekaphan 81'; Suphasek 88'	Stadium: 80th Birthday Anniversary Stadium

=== League table ===
Pos	Team	Pld	W	D	L	GF	GA	GD	Pts	Qualification or relegation
1	Muangthong United (C, Q)	30	20	7	3	64	19	+45	67	2011 AFC Champions League play-off round
2	Buriram PEA	30	17	12	1	51	19	+32	63	
3	Chonburi (Q)	30	17	9	4	57	28	+29	60	2011 AFC Cup Group stage round (Note: via FA Cup winners)
4	Thai Port	30	13	9	8	41	29	+12	48	
5	Bangkok Glass	30	12	9	9	48	38	+10	45	

Updated to match(es) played on 24 October 2010. Source: FIFA.com
Rules for classification: 1st points; 2nd head-to-head; 3rd match win; 4th goal difference; 5th number of goals scored
(C) Champions; (Q) Qualified for the phase indicated

==== Results by round ====
Round	1	2	3	4	5	6	7	8	9	10	11	12	13	14	15	16	17	18	19	20	21	22	23	24	25	26	27	28	29	30
Ground	H	A	H	H	H	A	H	A	A	H	A	A	H	H	A	A	H	H	A	A	H	A	A	A	H	A	H	H	H	A
Result	W	W	W	W	D	W	W	L	W	W	W	L	D	W	W	L	D	D	W	W	W	W	L	D	D	W	D	W	D	D
Position	1	1	1	1	1	1	1	2	1	2	1	2	2	2	2	2	2	2	2	2	2	2	2	2	2	2	2	2	2	3

A = Away; H = Home; W = Win; D = Draw; L = Loss

=== League ===
21 March 2010	Chonburi	3 – 0	Royal Thai Army	Chonburi
18:00 UTC+7	Ekaphan 15'; Arthit 58'; Therdsak 87'			Stadium: IPE Chonburi Stadium; Attendance: 8,124; Referee: Apisit Aonrak

4 April 2010	Pattaya United	1 – 2	Chonburi	Chonburi
17:00 UTC+7	Ludovick 8'		Therdsak 52' (pen.); Ekaphan 82'	Stadium: Nongprue Football Field; Attendance: 3,750; Referee: Chawarit Sa-nanwai

10 April 2010	Chonburi	5 – 1	TTM Phichit	Chonburi
	Therdsak 33' (pen.), 86'; Arthit 40'; Pipob 44'; Byrne 49'		Vargas-Aguilera 49'	Stadium: IPE Chonburi Stadium; Referee: Prapod Didsomsri

18 April 2010	Chonburi	3 – 1	Sisaket	Chonburi
18:00 UTC+7	Pipob 48', 59'; Arthit 55'		Y.D. Kim 61'	Stadium: IPE Chonburi Stadium; Attendance: 9,121; Referee: Prathan Nasawang

2 May 2010	Chonburi	0 – 0	Samut Songkhram	Chonburi
18:00 UTC+7				Stadium: IPE Chonburi Stadium; Attendance: 10,097; Referee: Preecha Kangram

8 May 2010	TOT-CAT	0 – 2	Chonburi	Nonthaburi
18:00 UTC+7			Pipob 15'; Therdsak 45'	Stadium: Yamaha Stadium; Referee: Thaweep Inkeaw

23 May 2010	Chonburi	2 – 1	Bangkok Glass	Chonburi
18:00 UTC+7	Ekaphan 11'; Therdsak 35' (pen.)		Panuwat (red card) 35'; Chatree 43'	Stadium: IPE Chonburi Stadium; Referee: Porached Wongkamdee

28 May 2010	Muangthong United	4 – 1	Chonburi	Nonthaburi
18:00 UTC+7	Siaka 32' (pen.), 71'; Mohamed 52'; Yaya 68'		Piyachart 2' (o.g.)	Stadium: Yamaha Stadium; Referee: Chaiya Mahaprab

5 June 2010	Rajnavy Rayong	0 – 4	Chonburi	Rayong
16:00 UTC+7			Bénié 52', 86'; Therdsak 68'; Ekaphan 75'	Stadium: Rayong Stadium; Referee: Anan Pa-yong

13 June 2010	Chonburi	2 – 1	Thai Port	Chonburi
18:00 UTC+7	Bénié 38'; Sukree 90'		Sarayoot 1'	Stadium: IPE Chonburi Stadium; Referee: Thaweep Inkeaw

19 June 2010	Police United	0 – 4	Chonburi	Bangkok
18:00 UTC+7			Phanuwat 10'; Jules Baga 17'; Kawamura 55' (o.g.); Ekaphan 87'	Stadium: Thammasat Stadium; Referee: Apisit Aonrak

26 June 2010	Buriram PEA	3 – 1	Chonburi	Buriram
17:00 UTC+7	Rangsan 20'; Dudu 30'; Suriya 71'		Arthit 43'; Cholratit (yellow card) 78' (yellow-red card)	Stadium: i-mobile Stadium; Attendance: 20,066; Referee: Thanom Burikut

4 July 2010	Chonburi	0 – 0	Osotspa Saraburi	Chonburi
18:00 UTC+7				Stadium: IPE Chonburi Stadium; Referee: Atthakorn Wetchakan

13 June 2010	Chonburi	2 – 1	Bangkok United	Chonburi
18:00 UTC+7	Therdsak 2' (pen.); Jules Baga 32'		Paramed 78'	Stadium: IPE Chonburi Stadium; Referee: Thaweep Inkeaw

14 July 2010	BEC Tero Sasana	1 – 4	Chonburi	Bangkok
18:00 UTC+7	Chakrit 90' (pen.)		Byrne 38', 40', 70'; Jules Baga 43'; Suree (red card) 90'	Stadium: Thephasadin Stadium; Referee: Chaiya Mahaprab

18 July 2010	Royal Thai Army	1 – 0	Chonburi	Bangkok
18:00 UTC+7	Bayiha 36'			Stadium: Thai Army Sports Stadium; Referee: Sura Sriart

25 July 2010	Chonburi	0 – 0	Muangthong United	Chonburi
18:00 UTC+7				Stadium: IPE Chonburi Stadium; Attendance: 12,180; Referee: Prapod Didsomsri

28 July 2010	Chonburi	2 – 2	Pattaya United	Chonburi
18:00 UTC+7	Jetsadakorn 68'; Simpson 71'		Ludovick 48'; Patipol 89'	Stadium: IPE Chonburi Stadium; Referee: Chawarit Sa-nanwai

7 August 2010	TTM Phichit	0 – 2	Chonburi	Phichit
16:30 UTC+7			Therdsak 51'; Pipob 90'	Stadium: Phichit Stadium; Referee: Preecha Kangram

14 August 2010	Sisaket	0 – 1	Chonburi	Sisaket
16:00 UTC+7			Berlin 5'	Stadium: Sri Nakhon Lamduan Stadium; Attendance: 14,678; Referee: Srichote Srikerd

18 August 2010	Chonburi	2 – 0	BEC Tero Sasana	Chonburi
19:00 UTC+7	Ney Fabiano 10'; Ekaphan 45'			Stadium: IPE Chonburi Stadium; Referee: Preecha Kangram

22 August 2010	Samut Songkhram	0 – 3	Chonburi	Samut Songkhram
16:00 UTC+7			Ney Fabiano 69', 78', 88'	Stadium: Samut Songkhram Stadium; Referee: Preecha Kangram

12 September 2010	Bangkok United	3 – 1	Chonburi	Bangkok
17:00 UTC+7	Sarif 12'; Maxime 26'; Kraison 34'		Therdsak 75' (pen.)	Stadium: Bangkok University Stadium; Referee: Apisit Aonrak

19 September 2010	Bangkok Glass	0 – 0	Chonburi	Pathum Thani
18:00 UTC+7			Suttinan (yellow card) 84' (yellow-red card)	Stadium: Leo Stadium; Referee: Preecha Kangram

25 September 2010	Chonburi	1 – 1	Rajnavy Rayong	Chonburi
18:00 UTC+7	Ney Fabiano 25'		Suttinan 26'	Stadium: IPE Chonburi Stadium; Referee: Thaweep Inkaew

29 September 2010	Thai Port	1 – 2	Chonburi	Bangkok
17:00 UTC+7	Sarayoot 68' (pen.)		Pipob 24'; Ney Fabiano 60' (pen.)	Stadium: PAT Stadium; Referee: Sura Sriart

3 October 2010	Chonburi	3 – 3	Police United	Chonburi
18:00 UTC+7	Ekaphan 44'; Suree 45'; Phuritad 90'; Cholratit (red card) 90'		Chakrit 11', 49', 59'	Stadium: IPE Chonburi Stadium; Referee: Mongkolchai Pradsri

13 October 2010	Chonburi	2 – 0	TOT-CAT	Chonburi
19:00 UTC+7	Pipob 23', 66'			Stadium: IPE Chonburi Stadium; Referee: Sakda Pansut

17 October 2010	Chonburi	2 – 2	Buriram PEA	Chonburi
18:00 UTC+7	Pipob 5', 25'		Douglas 54'; Seydou 69'	Stadium: IPE Chonburi Stadium; Attendance: 12,100; Referee: Srichote Srikerd

24 October 2010	Osotspa Saraburi	1 – 1	Chonburi	Saraburi
16:30 UTC+7	Jetsada 56'		Phaisan (red card) 45'; Cholratit (red card) 55'; Adul Lahso 77'	Stadium: Saraburi Stadium; Referee: Porached Wongkamdee

=== FA Cup ===
7 June 2010 Round 3	Chonburi	1 – 0	Samut Sakhon	Chonburi
18:30 UTC+7	Jetsadakorn 39'			Stadium: IPE Chonburi Stadium; Referee: Porached Wongkamdee

25 August 2010 Round 4	Chonburi	4 – 1	Samut Songkhram	Chonburi
19:00 UTC+7	Therdsak 5', 69' (pen.); Pipob 38'; Suree 81'		Jirawat 77'	Stadium: IPE Chonburi Stadium; Referee: Thaweep Inkeaw

15 September 2010 Quarter	Pattaya United	0 – 2	Chonburi	Chonburi
19:00 UTC+7			Pipob 38'; Therdsak 89'	Stadium: Nongprue Football Field; Referee: Preecha Kangram

30 October 2010 Semi	Royal Thai Army	0 – 2	Chonburi	Bangkok
17:00 UTC+7			Pipob 6', 34'	Stadium: Thai Army Sports Stadium

28 November 2010 Final	Muangthong United	1 – 2	Chonburi	Bangkok
16:00 UTC+7	Datsakorn 59'		Therdsak 44'; Pipob 120'	Stadium: Suphachalasai Stadium; Referee: Sura Sriart

=== League Cup ===
29 August 2010 Round 1	Phitsanulok	0 – 2	Chonburi	Phitsanulok
17:30 UTC+7			Pipob 35'; Adul 44'	Stadium: Phitsanulok Central Stadium

2 September 2010 Round 1	Chonburi	3 – 1	Phitsanulok	Chonburi
19:00 UTC+7	Berlin 61', 90'; Therdsak 85'		Weerawut 45'	Stadium: IPE Chonburi Stadium

22 September 2010 Round 2	Bangkok Glass	1 – 0	Chonburi	Pathum Thani
19:30 UTC+7	Anawin 68'			Stadium: Leo Stadium; Referee: Apisit Aonrak

20 October 2010 Round 2	Chonburi	0 – 2	Bangkok Glass	Chonburi
19:00 UTC+7			Ajayi 3'; Sutee 55'	Stadium: IPE Chonburi Stadium

=== Queen's Cup ===
7 February 2010 Group	Raj-Vithi	0 – 3	Chonburi	Chonburi
18:30 UTC+7		(Report)	Therdsak 14' (pen.); Bénié 85'; Ekaphan 90+4'	Stadium: Sirindhorn Stadium

9 February 2010 Group	Sinthana	1 – 4	Chonburi	Chonburi
18:30 UTC+7	Rattasart 53'	(Report)	Ekaphan 38', 73'; Bénié 82'; Rangsan 88'	Stadium: Sirindhorn Stadium

11 February 2010 Group	Chonburi	0 – 3	Krung Thai Bank-BG	Chonburi
18:30 UTC+7		(Report)	Chatree 81'; Sutee 82'; Ajayi 90'	Stadium: Sirindhorn Stadium

14 February 2010 Quarter	Samut Songkhram	0 – 2	Chonburi	Chonburi
18:00 UTC+7		(Report)	Rangsan 66', 86'	Stadium: Sirindhorn Stadium

16 February 2010 Semi	Police United	1 – 0	Chonburi	Chonburi
17:00 UTC+7	Nantawat 8'	(Report)		Stadium: IPE Chonburi Stadium
