= 2003 AFF Futsal Championship =

AFF Futsal Championship Malaysia 2003

Tournament details
- Host country: Malaysia
- City: Kuantan
- Dates: 1–6 July
- Teams: 6 (from 1 confederation)
- Venue: 1 (in 1 host city)

Final positions
- Champions: Thailand (2nd title)
- Runners-up: Malaysia
- Third place: Indonesia
- Fourth place: Cambodia

Tournament statistics
- Matches played: 17
- Goals scored: 156 (9.18 per match)
- Top scorer(s): (Thailand) Joe Nuengkord (14 goals)

The 2003 AFF Futsal Championship was held in Kuantan, Malaysia from 1 to 6 July 2003. Cambodia were the original hosts for this edition of the tournament but were unable to get their venue ready in time. Subsequently, the ASEAN Football Federation requested Malaysia to take over as hosts.

Defending champions Thailand, have sent a reserve team for this tournament as their main players were left behind to prepare for the AFC Futsal Championship which took place at the end of the month.

== Tournament ==
=== Group stage ===
Team	Pld	W	D	L	GF	GA	GD	Pts
Thailand	5	5	0	0	49	11	+38	15
Malaysia	5	4	0	1	29	15	+14	12
Indonesia	5	3	0	2	24	19	+5	9
Cambodia	5	1	0	4	23	35	−12	3
Brunei	5	1	0	4	19	34	−15	3
Philippines	5	1	0	4	8	31	−23	3

1 July 2003
16:00

Cambodia	7 – 8	Brunei

Sukpa Indoor Stadium, Kuantan
1 July 2003
18:00

Philippines	2 – 6	Indonesia

Sukpa Indoor Stadium, Kuantan
1 July 2003
20:00

Malaysia	1 – 6	Thailand

Sukpa Indoor Stadium, Kuantan

2 July 2003
16:00

Indonesia	7 – 5	Cambodia

Sukpa Indoor Stadium, Kuantan

2 July 2003
18:00

Thailand	11 – 2	Brunei
Anucha Munjarern (?); Joe Nuengkord (?); Sermphan Khumthinkaew (?); Kittisak Tanasuwan (?); Prasert Innui (?); Pongpipat Kamnuan (?)	Report	Muhammad Hardyman Lamit 5', 6'

Sukpa Indoor Stadium, Kuantan

2 July 2003
20:00

Philippines	1 – 6	Malaysia
Jimmy Doña 13'	Report	Jamhuri Zainuddin 2' (pen.), 16'; J. Arasan 5'; Mohd Saiful Mohd Noor 16'; Mohamad Feroz Karnim 30'; Addie Azwan Zainal 32'

Sukpa Indoor Stadium, Kuantan
Referee: Jeffrey Goh (Singapore)

3 July 2003
16:00

Indonesia	3 – 6	Thailand

Sukpa Indoor Stadium, Kuantan
3 July 2003
18:00

Brunei	4 – 5	Malaysia
Sabtu Lupat 4'; Muhammad Hardyman Lamit (?), 32'; Khairol Anwar 36'	Report	Mohd Saiful Mohd Noor 10'; Addie Azwan Zainal 13', 30'; Mohamad Feroz Abdul Karnim 29', 38'

Sukpa Indoor Stadium, Kuantan

3 July 2003
20:00

Cambodia	4 – 1	Philippines

Sukpa Indoor Stadium, Kuantan

4 July 2003
16:00

Brunei	2 – 4	Philippines
Awangku Mohammad Shahril 13'; Norazmiezul Maipaizan Amidon 18'	Report	Jimmy Doña 10', 33', 38'; Roger Lastimado 39'

Sukpa Indoor Stadium, Kuantan

4 July 2003
18:00

Thailand	13 – 4	Cambodia
Sermphan Kumthinkaew (?); Anucha Munjarern (?); Joe Nuengkord (?); Jadet Punpoem (?); Prasert Innui (?); Pongpipat Kamnuan (?)	Report	Chan Arunreath (?); Chan Veasna (?)

Sukpa Indoor Stadium, Kuantan

4 July 2003
20:00

Malaysia	3 – 1	Indonesia
Mohamed Faizul Abdul Ghaffar 3', 29'; Mohd Saiful Mohd Noor 35'	Report	Felix Ariffin 6'

Sukpa Indoor Stadium, Kuantan

5 July 2003
16:00

Indonesia	7 – 3	Brunei

Sukpa Indoor Stadium, Kuantan
5 July 2003
18:00

Philippines	0 – 13	Thailand

Sukpa Indoor Stadium, Kuantan
5 July 2003
20:00

Malaysia	6 – 3	Cambodia

Sukpa Indoor Stadium, Kuantan

=== Third place play-off ===
6 July 2003
18:00

Indonesia	5 – 3	Cambodia
	Report

Sukpa Indoor Stadium, Kuantan

=== Final ===
6 July 2003
20:00

Thailand	4 – 0	Malaysia

Sukpa Indoor Stadium, Kuantan

== Winner ==
2003 AFF Futsal Championship winners

Thailand
2nd title

== Goalscorers ==
The following is the list of goalscorers and the amount each scored in the tournament. It unknown in which games each player scored. Only the given information above for each match is known.

14 goals

- (Thailand) Joe Nuengkord

12 goals

- (Cambodia) Chan Veasna

9 goals

- (Thailand) Anucha Munjarern

8 goals

- (Thailand) Sermphan Khumthinkaew

7 goals

- (Brunei) Muhammad Hardyman Lamit
- (Cambodia) Chan Arunreath
- (Thailand) Lertchai Issarasuwipakorn

6 goals

- (Indonesia) Andri Irawan
- (Indonesia) Felix Arifin
- (Indonesia) Vennard Vonarza Victor
- (Philippines) Jimmy Doña
- (Thailand) Prasert Innui

4 goals

- (Brunei) Sabtu Lupat
- (Cambodia) Koa Kiri
- (Indonesia) Andrian Asuri
- (Thailand) Jadet Punpoem

3 goals

- (Cambodia) Ek Sovanara
- (Indonesia) Akbar Mallarangan
- (Malaysia) Mohamad Feroz Abdul Karnim
- (Malaysia) Mohd Saiful Mohd Noor
- (Thailand) Pongpipat Kamnuan

2 goals

- (Brunei) Khairol Anwar Yaakub
- (Cambodia) Tun Dimong
- (Indonesia) Edward Amaludin
- (Malaysia) Jamhuri Zainuddin
- (Malaysia) Mohamed Faizul Abdul Ghaffar
- (Thailand) Kittisak Tanasuwan

1 goal

- (Brunei) Norazmiezul Maipaizan Amidon
- (Brunei) Sumardi Taib
- (Brunei) Mohammad Shahril Ismail
- (Cambodia) Kim Chanbunrith
- (Indonesia) Achmad Ramdani
- (Indonesia) Tommy Yulian Sabruni
- (Malaysia) J.Arasan
- (Malaysia) Zainodin Kasmidim
- (Malaysia) Morgan Veloo
- (Philippines) Roger Lastimado
- (Philippines) Goni Tongson
