= 2012 Wuachon United F.C. season =

Wuachon United
2012 season
- Owner: Songkhla Football Co.Utd
- Chairman: Nipon Boonyamanee
- Manager: Jadet Meelarp
- Ground: Tinsulanon Stadium
- Thai Premier League: -
- FA Cup: -
- League Cup: -
Home colours	Away colours	Third colours

The 2012 Season is Wuachon United's run season in the Thai Premier League.

== Players ==
=== Current squad ===
As of March 9, 2012 Note: Flags indicate national team as defined under FIFA eligibility rules; some limited exceptions apply. Players may hold more than one non-FIFA nationality.

No.	Pos.	Nation	Player
1	GK	THA	Umarin Yaodam
3	MF	THA	Weerayut Jitkuntod
4	DF	THA	Samsem Nima (vice-captain)
5	DF	THA	Kraikiat Beadtaku
6	DF	THA	Rachanon Kanyathong
7	MF	THA	Chaiyarat Madsiri (captain)
8	MF	THA	Sarawut Janthapan
9	MF	GHA	Kwadwo Boabah
10	MF	THA	Arthit Sunthornpit
11	FW	CMR	Jules Baga
13	MF	THA	Kriangkhai Pimrat
15	DF	JPN	Daiki Higuchi
16	MF	THA	Phuritad Jarikanon
17	MF	CMR	Antonie Clement Bayema

No.	Pos.	Nation	Player
18	GK	THA	Chayoot Nakchamnarn
19	DF	THA	Jeera Jarernsuk
20	DF	CIV	Koné Seydou
21	MF	THA	Manop Sornkaew
22	MF	THA	Witthawat Iamram
24	FW	THA	Kirati Keawsombat
25	GK	THA	Dol-Loh Ma-I
26	FW	BRA	Aron da Silva
27	MF	THA	Suphasek Kaikaew
28	DF	THA	Kittipong Rongrak
29	DF	THA	Jetsadakorn Hemdaeng
38	FW	BRA	Ney Fabiano
39	MF	THA	Ekkalak Thongmak

== Competitions ==
=== Pre-season/friendly ===
14 February 2012 Friendly	Sriracha Suzuki	2 – 1	Wuachon United	Chonburi
16:00		report(Thai)		Stadium: Suzuki Stadium

18 February 2012 Friendly	TOT	0 – 2	Wuachon United	Bangkok
16:00		report(Thai)	Kwadwo Boabah 67'; Witthawat Iamram 87'	Stadium: TOT Stadium Chaeng Watthana

25 February 2012 Friendly	Wuachon United	1 – 0	Buriram United	Songkhla
17:00	Aron da Silva 45'	report(Thai)		Stadium: Jiranakorn Stadium

4 March 2012 Friendly	Phattalung	0 – 3	Wuachon United	Phattalung
18:00		report(Thai)	Ney Fabiano 3'; Kwadwo Boabah 25'; Koné Seydou 69'	Stadium: Phattalung Stadium

7 March 2012 Friendly	Wuachon United	0 – 1	SCG Muangthong United	Songkhla
18:00		[www.siamsport.co.th/sport_football/120307_283.html report(Thai)]	Datsakorn 72'	Stadium: Jiranakorn Stadium

=== Thai Premier League ===
==== League table ====
Pos	Team	Pld	W	D	L	GF	GA	GD	Pts
11	Police United	34	10	12	12	37	38	−1	42
12	TOT	34	10	12	12	43	46	−3	42
13	Wuachon United	34	9	14	11	46	54	−8	41
14	Chainat	34	9	12	13	59	72	−13	39
15	Pattaya United	34	9	10	15	35	47	−12	37

Updated to match(es) played on 28 October 2012. Source: Thai Premier League
Rules for classification: 1st points; 2nd head-to-head (only match result, not used aggregate); 3rd match win; 4th goal difference; 5th goals scored.

==== Match Stats ====
18 March 2012 1	Bangkok Glass	2 – 0	Wuachon United	Leo Stadium
18:00	Sarun 45+1'; Teerathep 72'	report(Thai)		Attendance: 7,900; Referee: Prapoj Dissomsri

24 March 2012 2	Chainat	1 – 1	Wuachon United	Chainat Stadium
18:00	Phuwadol 31'	report(Thai)	Bayema 42'	Attendance: 4,274; Referee: Chaiya Mahapab

28 March 2012 3	TOT	3 – 3	Wuachon United	TOT Stadium Chaeng Watthana
18:00	Warut 2'; Thanakorn 40'; Kawamura 54'	report(Thai)	Aron 45'; Arthit 45+1'; Sarawut 80'	Attendance: 549; Referee: Thanom Burikut

1 April 2012 4	Esan United	1 - 2	Wuachon United	Tung Burapha Stadium
16:00	Somporn 51'	report(Thai)	Keerathi 59'; Weerayut 80'	Referee: Chaireag Ngamsom

8 April 2012 5	Wuachon United	2 - 2	BBCU	Tinsulanon Stadium
18:00	Keerathi 50', 64'		Adisak G. 40'; Sylla 76'

21 April 2012 6	Osotspa Saraburi	1-2	Wuachon United	Saraburi Stadium
18:00	Suebyim 90+3'	report(Thai)	Aron da Silva 24', 38'	Attendance: 2,374

29 April 2012 7	Wuachon United	v	Army United	Tinsulanon Stadium
18:00

7 May 2012 8	Buriram United	v	Wuachon United	Thunder Castle Stadium
18:00

=== Top goalscorers ===
3 goal

- Aron da Silva

2 goal

- Jules Baga
- Kirati Keawsombat

1 goal

- Antonie Clement Bayema
- Arthit Sunthornpit
- Sarawut Janthapan
- Weerayut Jitkuntod
