= Sirisak Musbu-ngor =

Thai footballer

Personal information
- Full name: Sirisak Musbu-ngor
- Date of birth: 18 December 1986 (age 39)
- Place of birth: Chanthaburi, Thailand
- Height: 1.69 m (5 ft 6 1/2 in)
- Position: Left winger

Youth career
- Chanthaburi

Senior career*
Years	Team	Apps	(Gls)
2010	Chanthaburi	?	(26)
2011	Rayong		
2012–2013	Trat		
2014	Sukhothai		
2015	Chanthaburi		
2016	Lampang		
2017–2019	Trat	11	(0)
2019	JL Chiangmai	14	(1)
2020–2021	Lamphun Warrior	15	(1)
2021	Banbueng	15	(1)
2022	Chanthaburi	0	(0)
- * Club domestic league appearances and goals

Sirisak Musbu-ngor (Thai: ศิริศักดิ์ มัสบูงอ) is a Thai professional footballer who is currently playing as a left-winger.

== Honour ==
Lamphun Warrior

- Thai League 3 (1): 2020-2021

== Personal life ==
Sirisak has a brother, Sittichai Masbu-ngor, who is also a professional footballer.
