= Ramthep Chaipan =

Thai footballer (born 1977)

Personal information
- Full name: Ramthep Chaipan
- Date of birth: 4 January 1977 (age 49)
- Place of birth: Trang, Thailand
- Height: 1.65 m (5 ft 5 in)
- Position: Defensive midfielder

Youth career
- 1995–1997: Assumption School Bangkok

Senior career*
Years	Team	Apps	(Gls)
1997–2010	Bangkok United	105	(13)
2011	Ayutthaya		
2011	Trang		
2012	Phang Nga		
2012	Krabi		
2013	Nakhon Si Heritage		
Total		105	(13)
- * Club domestic league appearances and goals as of 14 November 2008

Ramthep Chaipan (Thai: รามเทพ ชัยแป้น, born 4 January 1977) is a Thai retired professional footballer who played as a defensive midfielder.

== Personal life ==
Ramthep's brother Annop Chaipan is also a footballer and plays as a defensive midfielder.

== Club career ==
He previously played for Bangkok University FC in the 2007 AFC Champions League group stage.
