= Marcus Vinicius =

Marcus Vinicius may refer to:

- Marcus Vinicius (consul 19 BC), Roman consul and general
- Marcus Vinicius (consul 30), Roman consul
- Marcus Vinícius (footballer, born 1963), Brazilian footballer
- Marcus Vinícius Cesário (born 1986), Brazilian footballer
- Marcus Vinicius D'Almeida (born 1998), Brazilian archer
- Marcus Vinicius de Souza (born 1984), Brazilian basketball player
- Marcus Vinicius de Morais (born 1974), Brazilian footballer
- Marcus Vinícius da Cruz Alves Nóbrega (born 1983), Brazilian footballer
- Marcus Vinícius Dias (1923–1992), Brazilian basketball player
- Marcus Vinícius Simões Freire (born 1962), Brazilian former volleyball player
- Marcus Vinicius Urban Toledo dos Reis (born 1986), Brazilian/Spanish basketball player
- Marcus Vinícius Lima da Silva (born 1990), Brazilian footballer
- Vinicius de Moraes (Marcus Vinicius da Cruz de Mello Moraes, 1913–1980), Brazilian musician
- Marcus Vinicius da Silva de Oliveira, Brazilian footballer
- Marcus Vinícius Vidal Cunha (born 1992), Brazilian footballer
- Marcus Vinicius Molinari Reis (1997–2021), Brazilian footballer

== See also ==
- Marcos Vinícius (disambiguation)
