= Ekkasak Buabao =

Thai footballer (born 1985)

Personal information
- Full name: Ekkasak Buabao
- Date of birth: 11 May 1985 (age 41)
- Place of birth: Ratchaburi, Thailand
- Height: 1.72 m (5 ft 7 1/2 in)
- Position: Defender

Team information
- Current team: Ayutthaya United
- Number: 29

Senior career*
Years	Team	Apps	(Gls)
2007–2010	Samut Songkhram		
2011	Chanthaburi		
2012	TTM Chaingmai		
2012–2014	Samut Songkhram	33	(0)
2015–2016	Samut Sakhon		
2017–	Ayutthaya United		
- * Club domestic league appearances and goals as of 22 June 2008

Ekkasak Buabao (Thai: เอกศักดิ์ บัวเบา, born May 11, 1985), simply known as Ekk (Thai: เอก), is a Thai professional footballer who plays as a defender for Thai League 3 club Ayutthaya United.
