= Kittipong Loon-jak =

Thai footballer (born 1986)

Personal information
- Full name: Kittipong Loon-jak
- Date of birth: January 15, 1986 (age 40)
- Place of birth: Sakon Nakhon, Thailand
- Height: 1.68 m (5 ft 6 in)
- Position: Striker

Senior career*
| Years | Team | Apps | (Gls) |
| 2007–2009 | Samut Songkhram | | |
| 2010–2012 | Ranong | | |
| 2013–? | Singburi Bangrajun F.C. | | |
- * Club domestic league appearances and goals as of 22 June 2008

Kittipong Loon-jak (Thai กิตติพงษ์ ลุนจักร) is a Thai footballer. He played for Samut Songkhram FC including the 2008 and 2009 season when the club was competing in Thailand Premier League which he helped the team and finished 7th in the league in 2008.

He played for Ranong F.C. during 2010-2012 season. In a home game against Trang F.C., Kittipong was handed red card for hitting referee while the team manager claimed that the referee was backpedaling and hit Kittipong and fell and mistakenly thought he was attacked by Kittipong. Fans of the team protested the ruling, causing 5–7 minutes of delay in the game. He was suspended for the remaining of 2010 season and fined 30,000 Baht for the intentionally hitting referee and the lack of sportsmanship. He played in U League (Thailand University League) for Institute of Technology Ayothaya during the suspension period.

He has retired from professional football and works in health care in Samut Songkhram province.

== Clubs ==
- Samut Songkhram F.C. - 2007–2009
- Ranong F.C. - 2010–2012
- Singburi Bangrajun F.C. - 2013–?
