= Nantapol Supathai =

Thai footballer

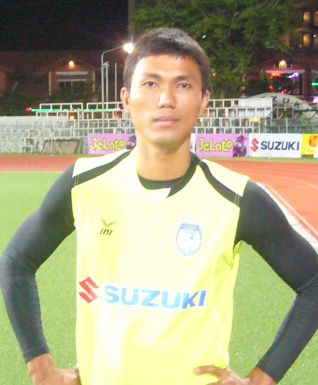

Personal information
- Full name: Nantapol Supathai
- Date of birth: January 9, 1982 (age 44)
- Place of birth: Chonburi, Thailand
- Height: 1.84 m (6 ft 1/2 in)
- Position: Goalkeeper

Team information
- Current team: Phrae United
- Number: 18

Senior career*
Years	Team	Apps	(Gls)
2008–2012	Sriracha	96	(0)
2013	Suphanburi	0	(0)
2014	Songkhla United	16	(0)
2015	Siam Navy	2	(0)
2016–2017	Rayong	19	(0)
2017–	Phrae United	45	(0)
- * Club domestic league appearances and goals as of 30 April 2023

Nantapol Supathai (Thai: นันทพล ศุภไทย) is a Thai professional footballer who plays for Phrae United in the Thai League 3. He was voted the best goalkeeper in the 2010 Thai Division 1 League.
