= Marcos Vinícius =

Marcos Vinícius may refer to:

- Marcos Vinícius Bento (born 1992), Brazilian footballer commonly known as Marquinhos
- Marcos Vinicius (fighter) (born 1979), Brazilian fighter
- Marcos Vinícius da Silva Santos (born 1997), Brazilian footballer
- Marcos Vinícius de Jesus Araújo (born 1994), Brazilian footballer
- Marcos Vinícius dos Santos Gonçalves (born 1979), Brazilian football manager commonly known as Marquinhos Santos
- Marcos Vinícius Gomes de Lima, a Brazilian footballer commonly known as Dimba
- Marcos Vinícius Gomes Nascimento (born 1991), Brazilian footballer
- Marcos Vinícius Santos Miranda, a Brazilian footballer commonly known as Marcos Miranda
- Marcos Vinicius Viana Ribeiro (born 1989), Brazilian footballer commonly known as Araruama
- Marcus Vinícius Acácio, Brazilian volleyball player

== See also ==
- Marcus Vinicius (disambiguation)
