= Suchon Sa-nguandee =

Thai footballer (born 1982)

Personal information
- Full name: Suchon Sa-nguandee
- Date of birth: 10 March 1982 (age 44)
- Place of birth: Nakhon Pathom, Thailand
- Height: 1.77 m (5 ft 9 1/2 in)
- Positions: Left back; winger

Team information
- Current team: Kasem Bundit University
- Number: 11

Youth career
- 2006–2007: BEC Tero Sasana

Senior career*
Years	Team	Apps	(Gls)
2008–2011	BEC Tero Sasana	28	(5)
2012–2014	Suphanburi	38	(0)
2014	→ Bangkok (loan)	4	(0)
2015–2017	Port	31	(0)
2017–2018	Nongbua Pitchaya	39	(1)
2019	Simork	4	(0)
2019	Air Force United	15	(0)
2020–2021	Uthai Thani	28	(0)
2021–2022	Pathumthani University	23	(1)
2022–	Kasem Bundit University	6	(0)

International career
2005	Thailand U23		
- * Club domestic league appearances and goals as of 1 December 2022

Suchon Sa-nguandee (Thai: สุชนม์ สงวนดี; born March 10, 1982) or formerly Chalakorn Sa-nguandee (Thai: ชลากร สงวนดี), simply known as Chon (Thai: ชล), is a Thai professional footballer who plays as a left back for Thai League 3 club Kasem Bundit University.

== Honours ==
=== International ===
Thailand U-23

- Sea Games Gold Medal (1); 2005
