= Weera Koedpudsa =

Thai footballer

Personal information
- Full name: Weera Koedpudsa
- Date of birth: 1 July 1984 (age 42)
- Place of birth: Nan, Thailand
- Height: 1.82 m (6 ft 0 in)
- Position: Goalkeeper

Youth career
- 1996–2001: Patumkongka School

Senior career*
Years	Team	Apps	(Gls)
2002–2004	Bangkok Bank	38	(0)
2004–2010	Bangkok United	131	(0)
2011	Muangthong United	28	(0)
2012–2015	TOT	53	(0)
2013	→ Muangthong United (loan)	18	(0)
2015–2017	Port	5	(0)
2016	→ Sisaket (loan)	24	(0)
2017	Nakhon Ratchasima	16	(0)
Total		313	(0)

International career
2007	Thailand U23	6	(0)
2007	Thailand	1	(0)
Medal record
Thailand under-23
Southeast Asian Games men's football
Gold medal – first place	2007 Nakhon Ratchasima	Team
- * Club domestic league appearances and goals as of 00:14, 21 November 2017 (UTC)

Weera Koedpudsa (Thai: วีระ เกิดพุดซา, born 1 July 1984), simply known as Ra (Thai: ระ) is a Thai former professional footballer who plays as a goalkeeper.

== International career ==
=== International ===
As of 12 November 2015

National team	Year	Apps	Goals
Thailand	2007	1	0
Thailand	Total	1	0

== Honours ==
=== Club ===
Bangkok United

- Thai Premier League (1): 2006

=== International ===
Thailand U-23

- Sea Games Gold Medal (1); 2007

== Match fixing scandal and ban ==
On February 21, 2017, Weera was accused of match-fixing on several league games. He was arrested by Royal Thai Police and banned from football for life.
