= Santipap Siri =

Thai footballer (born 1985)

Personal information
- Full name: Santipap Siri
- Date of birth: April 4, 1985 (age 41)
- Place of birth: Bangkok, Thailand
- Height: 1.69 m (5 ft 6 1/2 in)
- Position: Attacking midfielder

Senior career*
Years	Team	Apps	(Gls)
2007–2012	Samut Songkhram		
2013–2014	Air Force Central	7	(0)
2014	Samut Songkhram	6	(0)
2015	Trat		
2015	Bangkok		
2016	Looktabfah		
2017	Kasem Bundit University		
- * Club domestic league appearances and goals as of 22 June 2008

Santipap Siri (Thai: สันติภาพ ศิริ, born April 4, 1985) is a retired professional footballer from Thailand.
