= Sittichai Masbu-ngor =

Thai footballer

Sittichai Musbu-ngor
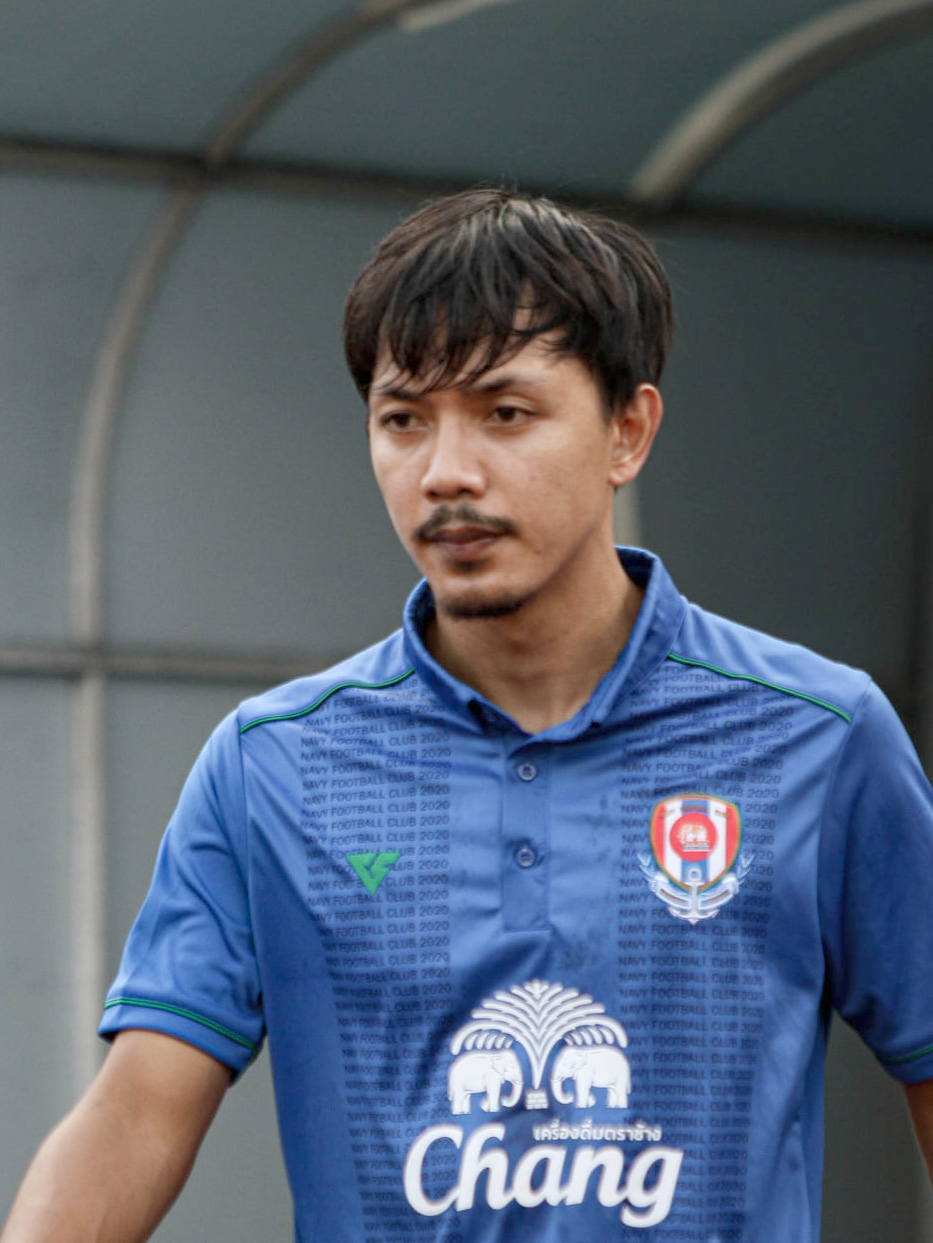

Personal information
- Full name: Sittichai Musbu-ngor
- Date of birth: 13 October 1984 (age 42)
- Place of birth: Thailand
- Height: 1.68 m (5 ft 6 in)
- Position: Attacking midfielder

Senior career*
Years	Team	Apps	(Gls)
2016	Lampang		
2017–2019	Trat	7	(0)
2020–2021	Navy	31	(1)
2021–2022	Chanthaburi	21	(2)
- * Club domestic league appearances and goals

Sittichai Musbu-ngor (Thai: สิทธิชัย มัสบูงอ) is a Thai professional footballer who is currently playing as an attacking midfielder.

== Personal life ==
Sittichai has a brother, Sirisak Musbu-ngor, who is also a professional footballer.
