= Assaming Mae =

Thai footballer (born 1988)

Personal information
- Full name: Assaming Mae
- Date of birth: 13 June 1988 (age 38)
- Place of birth: Narathiwat, Thailand
- Height: 1.67 m (5 ft 5 1/2 in)
- Position: Midfielder

Senior career*
Years	Team	Apps	(Gls)
2011–2014	Police United	44	(6)
2015	Port	0	(0)
2015–2016	Chainat Hornbill	14	(0)
2017	Nara United	16	(0)

International career
2011	Thailand	1	(0)
- * Club domestic league appearances and goals

Assaming Mae (Thai: อัสมิง แม; born 13 June 1988) is a Thai retired professional footballer who played as a midfielder.

== International career ==
In July, 2011 Assaming debuted for Thailand in a friendly match against Myanmar.

=== International ===
As of 12 November 2015

National team	Year	Apps	Goals
Thailand	2011	1	0
Thailand	Total	1	0
