= Kittisak Tanasuwan =

Thai footballer (born 1980)

Personal information
- Full name: Kittisak Tanasuwan
- Date of birth: 8 December 1980 (age 45)
- Place of birth: Thailand
- Height: 1.73 m (5 ft 8 in)
- Position: Midfielder

Senior career*
Years	Team	Apps	(Gls)
2001–2008	Port Authority of Thailand		
2009	Thai Port		

International career
2007	Thailand	1	(0)
- * Club domestic league appearances and goals

Kittisak Tanasuwan (born 8 December 1980) is a Thai retired footballer who played for Port Authority of Thailand (2001–2008) and Thai Port (2009). He played one competitive match for the Thailand national team, as a first-half substitute in a 2010 World Cup qualifying match against Macau. Kittisak also played for his country in a non-FIFA match against Iraq in 2006.
