= Prasarn Pansamlee =

Thai footballer (born 1982)

Personal information
- Full name: Prasarn Pansamlee
- Date of birth: 26 March 1982 (age 44)
- Place of birth: Suphan Buri, Thailand
- Height: 1.70 m (5 ft 7 in)
- Position: Full back

Youth career
- Suphanburi

Senior career*
Years	Team	Apps	(Gls)
2003–2008	Suphanburi	85	(6)
2009–2010	Samut Songkhram	38	(4)
2011	Chanthaburi		
2012	Ranong United		
2014	Samut Sakhon		
- * Club domestic league appearances and goals as of 22 April 2010

Prasarn Pansamlee (Thai: ประสาร พันธ์สำลี) is a Thai retired footballer. He played for Samut Songkhram F.C. in the Thai Premier League. In 2012, playing for Rayong United F.C., he received a lifetime ban from the Football Association of Thailand for attempted assault against the referee during a match. The ban was later reduced to two years.
