= Sirachat Preedaboon =

Thai footballer

Personal information
- Full name: Sirachat Preedaboon
- Date of birth: 1 September 1983 (age 43)
- Place of birth: Kanchanaburi, Thailand
- Height: 1.75 m (5 ft 9 in)
- Position: Goalkeeper

Senior career*
Years	Team	Apps	(Gls)
2010	Air Force Central	9	(0)
2011–2014	Pattaya United	10	(0)
2015–2021	Angthong	57	(0)
- * Club domestic league appearances and goals as of 21 September 2021

Sirachat Preedaboon (Thai: ศิรชัช ปรีดาบุญ; born September 1, 1983) is a Thai professional footballer.
