= Michel Charlin Tcheumaleu =

Cameroonian footballer (born 1975)

Michel Tcheumaleu
Personal information
- Full name: Michel Charlin TCHEUMALEU
- Date of birth: April 21, 1975 (age 51)
- Place of birth: Ebolowa, Cameroon
- Height: 1.70 m (5 ft 7 in)
- Position: Defensive midfielder

Team information
- Current team: Samut Songkhram FC
- Number: 37

Youth career
- Les Brasseries du Cameroon
- Rail FC Douala
- Avignon (1995), Montaigu (1997)

Senior career*
Years	Team	Apps	(Gls)
1996–1997	Rail FC Douala		
1997–2000	Stade FC Bandjoun		
2000–2002	Sable FC		
2002–2005	Renaissance FC Ngoumou		
2006	Samut Prakan F.C.		
2006–2007	Raj-Vithi F.C.		
2007–2008	Osotspa Saraburi F.C.	25	(0)
2009–present	Samut Songkhram FC/Custom United FC		
- * Club domestic league appearances and goals

Michel Charlin Tcheumaleu (born 21 April 1975 in Ebolowa) is a Cameroonian footballer, who plays for Thailand Premier League club side Samut Songkhram FC.
