= Suradej Saotaisong =

Thai footballer (born 1981)

Personal information
- Full name: Suradej Saotaisong
- Date of birth: 3 May 1981 (age 45)
- Place of birth: Maha Sarakham, Thailand
- Height: 1.78 m (5 ft 10 in)
- Position: Defender

Senior career*
Years	Team	Apps	(Gls)
2007–2010	Rajnavy Rayong	57	(4)
2011	Chainat	19	(0)
2014	Singhtarua	16	(1)
2015	BEC Tero Sasana	0	(0)
2015	→ Port (loan)	1	(1)
2016	Prachuap	28	(2)
2017	Royal Thai Fleet	15	(0)
- * Club domestic league appearances and goals as of 07:03, 17 September 2017 (UTC)

Suradej Saotaisong (Thai: สุรเดช เสาไธสง, born May 3, 1981) is a former professional footballer from Thailand.
