= Atthapol Poonarae =

Thai footballer (born 1987)

Personal information
- Full name: Atthapol Poonarae
- Date of birth: September 6, 1987 (age 39)
- Place of birth: Kalasin, Thailand
- Height: 1.80 m (5 ft 11 in)
- Position: Midfielder

Team information
- Current team: Samut Songkhram
- Number: 5

Senior career*
Years	Team	Apps	(Gls)
2007–present	Samut Songkhram		
- * Club domestic league appearances and goals as of 22 June 2008

Atthapol Poonarae (Thai อัฐพล ภูนาแร่ ) is a Thai footballer. He plays for Thailand Premier League clubside Samut Songkhram FC. as midfielder.

== Clubs ==
- Samut Songkhram FC - 2007–present
