= Tripob Shushuenklin =

Thai footballer (born 1979)

Personal information
- Full name: Tripob Shushuenklin
- Date of birth: 12 June 1979 (age 47)
- Place of birth: Rayong, Thailand
- Height: 1.65 m (5 ft 5 in)
- Position: Midfielder

Senior career*
Years	Team	Apps	(Gls)
2001–2004	Stock Exchange of Thailand	65	(2)
2005–2007	Bangkok Bank	41	(0)
2008	Krung Thai Bank	16	(0)
2009–2010	Samut Songkhram	35	(4)
2011	Chanthaburi		
- * Club domestic league appearances and goals as of 14 October 2008

Tripob Shushuenklin is a Thai retired footballer.
