= Patcharin Sooksai =

Thai footballer (born 1981)

Personal information
- Date of birth: November 29, 1981 (age 44)
- Place of birth: Trang, Thailand
- Height: 1.72 m (5 ft 7 1/2 in)
- Position: Midfielder

Senior career*
Years	Team	Apps	(Gls)
2006–2011	TTM Phichit	94	(7)
2011	Samut Songkhram	20	(0)
2011	Chanthaburi		
2012	Saraburi		
2013–2014	Samut Songkhram		
2014–2016	Ayutthaya		
2017	Navy		
- * Club domestic league appearances and goals as of 22 April 2010

Patcharin Sooksai (Thai: พัชรินทร์ สุกใส; born November 29, 1981) is a retired professional footballer from Thailand.
