= Warut Wongdee =

Thai footballer (born 1986)

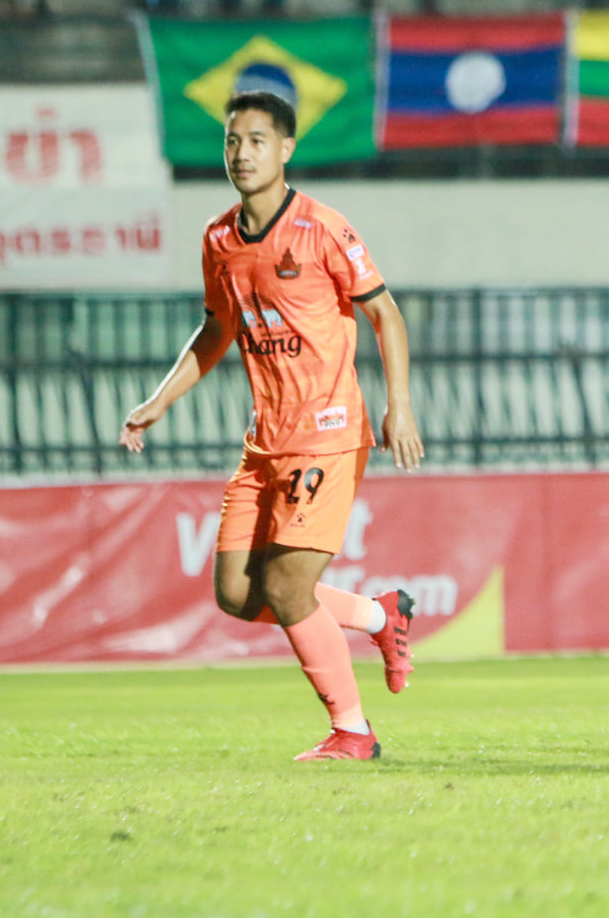
- Warut Wongdee playing for Udon Thani.

Personal information
- Date of birth: 29 March 1986 (age 40)
- Place of birth: Chiang Mai, Thailand
- Height: 1.78 m (5 ft 10 in)
- Position: Midfielder

Team information
- Current team: Pattaya Dolphins United
- Number: 86

Senior career*
Years	Team	Apps	(Gls)
2013	TOT	17	(0)
2014–2015	Ratchaburi	9	(0)
2016	Krabi		
2017	Khon Kaen		
2018	Samut Sakhon		
2018	Sisaket		
2019–2020	Lamphun Warrior	11	(0)
2020	Uthai Thani	1	(0)
2021–2022	Udon Thani	32	(0)
2022–	Pattaya Dolphins United	25	(1)
- * Club domestic league appearances and goals as of 20 May 2023

Warut Wongdee (Thai: วรุตม์ วงศ์ดี, born March 29, 1986) is a Thai professional footballer who plays as a midfielder for Thai League 3 club Pattaya Dolphins United.

== Honours ==
=== Club ===
Pattaya Dolphins United

- Thai League 3 Eastern Region: 2022–23
