= Nattakit Fongwitoo =

Thai footballer

Personal information
- Full name: Nattakit Fongwitoo
- Date of birth: 4 January 1993 (age 33)
- Place of birth: Bangkok, Thailand
- Height: 1.70 m (5 ft 7 in)
- Position: Forward

Senior career*
Years	Team	Apps	(Gls)
2011	Uthai Thani		
2012–2015	Bangkok United		
2013	→ Chamchuri United (loan)		
2014	→ RSU (loan)		
2015	→ Krung Thonburi (loan)		
2016	Port	6	(0)
2016	→ Lampang (loan)		
2017	Kasetsart		
2018	Nakhon Pathom		
2019–2020	MOF Customs United	9	(0)
2020–2021	Songkhla	3	(0)
2021–2023	Pathumthani University	31	(2)
- * Club domestic league appearances and goals as of 19 March 2023

Nattakit Fongwitoo (Thai: ณัฐกิจ ฟองวิทู), (born 4 January 1993) is a Thai professional footballer who plays as a forward. He played six times for Port F.C. during the 2015 Thai Premier League season.
