= Panuwat Yimsa-ngar =

Thai footballer (born 1982)

Personal information
- Full name: Panuwat Yimsa-ngar
- Date of birth: 16 January 1982 (age 44)
- Place of birth: Nakhon Pathom, Thailand
- Height: 1.75 m (5 ft 9 in)
- Position: Attacking midfielder

Youth career
- 2001–2004: IPE Samut Sakhon

Senior career*
Years	Team	Apps	(Gls)
2005–2009	Nakhon Pathom	93	(16)
2010–2011	Samut Songkhram	15	(7)
2012	BEC Tero Sasana	1	(0)
2012–2013	Ratchaburi Mitr Phol	7	(0)
2013–2015	Saraburi	20	(0)
2016	Nakhon Pathom United	26	(4)
2017	Ayutthaya	21	(3)
2018	IPE Samut Sakhon United	11	(2)
Total		194	(32)
- * Club domestic league appearances and goals as of 22 April 2010

Panuwat Yimsa-ngar (Thai: พานุวัฒ ยิ้มสง่า, born January 16, 1982) is a retired professional footballer from Thailand.

== Honours ==
=== Club ===
Ratchaburi F.C.

- Thai Division 1 League Champions (1) : 2012
