= Kittiraj Sanor =

Thai footballer (born 1987)

Personal information
- Full name: Kittiraj Sanor
- Date of birth: January 24, 1987 (age 39)
- Place of birth: Sisaket, Thailand
- Height: 1.69 m (5 ft 6 1/2 in)
- Position: Midfielder

Team information
- Current team: Sisaket
- Number: 12

Senior career*
Years	Team	Apps	(Gls)
2008–2009	Samut Songkhram		
2010	Prachinburi		
2013–	Sisaket		
- * Club domestic league appearances and goals as of 14 October 2008

Kittiraj Sanor (Thai: กิตติราช เสนาะ) is a Thai footballer. He played for Thai Premier League clubside Sisaket, and is currently a free agent.
