= Annop Chaipan =

Thai footballer (born 1983)

Personal information
- Full name: Annop Chaipan
- Date of birth: 6 July 1983 (age 43)
- Place of birth: Trang, Thailand
- Height: 1.76 m (5 ft 9 1/2 in)
- Position: Defensive midfielder

Senior career*
Years	Team	Apps	(Gls)
2010	Chanthaburi		
2011	Trang		
2012	TTM Chaingmai		
2013–2014	Samutsongkhram	15	
2014	Phang Nga		
2015	Ubon UMT United		
2015–2016	Samut Sakhon		
2017	Trang		
- * Club domestic league appearances and goals as of 22 April 2017

Annop Chaipan (Thai: อรรณพ ชัยแป้น, born July 6, 1983) is a Thai retired professional footballer who played as a defensive midfielder.

== Personal life ==
Annop's brother Ramthep Chaipan is also a footballer as a defensive midfielder.
