= Narong Wisetsri =

Thai footballer

Personal information
- Full name: Narong Wisetsri
- Date of birth: 1 October 1976 (age 50)
- Place of birth: Bangkok, Thailand
- Height: 1.72 m (5 ft 7 1/2 in)
- Position: Goalkeeper

Team information
- Current team: AUU Inter Bangkok
- Number: 69

Senior career*
Years	Team	Apps	(Gls)
2009–2012	Thai Port	21	(0)
2013	Nakhon Pathom United	2	(0)
2014	Osotspa Saraburi	0	(0)
2015–2016	Port	9	(0)
2017	Super Power Samut Prakan	11	(0)
2018	Deffo		
2020–2022	Kanjanapat	32	(0)
2023–	AUU Inter Bangkok	7	(0)
- * Club domestic league appearances and goals as of 3 March 2024

Narong Wisetsri (Thai: ณรงค์ วิเศษศรี, born October 1, 1976) is a Thai professional footballer who currently plays for AUU Inter Bangkok in the Thai League 3. He once played for Thailand national beach soccer team.

== Honours ==
=== Club ===
Thai Port F.C.

- Thai FA Cup winner (1) : 2009
- Thai League Cup winner (1) : 2010
