= Berlin Ndebe-Nlome =

Cameroonian footballer

Personal information
- Date of birth: 29 October 1987 (age 38)
- Place of birth: Douala, Cameroon
- Height: 1.76 m (5 ft 9 1/2 in)
- Position: Striker

Senior career*
Years	Team	Apps	(Gls)
2003–2005	Westerlo		
2006–2007	Portsmouth	0	(0)
2007	Crawley Town	1	(0)
2008	Constancia		
2009	Atlético Monzón		
2010	P. Ferreira	3	(0)
2010–2011	Chonburi		
2012–2013	Sriracha		(15)
2014	Ayutthaya		(13)
2015–2016	Phuket		
2017	Samutsongkhram	15	(12)
2017	Nakhon Pathom		
2018	Chachoengsao Hi-Tek		
2019–	Phuket City		
- * Club domestic league appearances and goals as of 11:03, 11 November 2019 (UTC)

Berlin Ndebe-Nlome is a Cameroonian footballer. He played three matches in the Primeira Liga of Portugal for P. Ferreira in 2010.

== Career ==
Whilst on trial at Portsmouth he became somewhat of an enigma around the club, playing in numerous pre-season friendlies with only his name known to players and fans and was eventually offered a contract at the club, finally receiving a work permit six weeks after signing.

Prior to signing for Portsmouth he was contracted to Belgian First Division club K.V.C. Westerlo. After his release from Portsmouth, Berlin signed for Crawley Town on a short-term deal from Portsmouth in November 2007, lasting less than a month before being allowed to move on.

In July 2009 he was offered a chance to impress on trial at Swindon Town F.C. and appeared in two pre-season friendlies before moving on. He went on to play in Portugal for P. Ferreira in 2010, although he only featured in three league matches before moving clubs again.
