= Suksayam Chanmaneewech =

Thai footballer (born 1985)

Personal information
- Full name: Suksayam Chanmaneewech
- Date of birth: 8 December 1985 (age 40)
- Place of birth: Nan, Thailand
- Height: 1.68 m (5 ft 6 in)
- Position: Left back

Team information
- Current team: Samut Sakhon
- Number: 37

Senior career*
Years	Team	Apps	(Gls)
2007–2008	Thai Port	25	(2)
2009–2014	Samut Songkhram	36	(0)
2015	Port	3	(0)
2015	Udon Thani	17	(0)
2016	Kasetsart	0	(0)
2016–2018	Samut Sakhon	37	(0)
2018–	Sisaket	0	(0)
- * Club domestic league appearances and goals as of 22 June 2008

Suksayam Chanmaneewech (Thai สุขสยาม ชาญมณีเวช) is a Thai footballer. He plays for Thai League 2 clubside Samut Sakhon.
