= Jules Baga =

Cameroonian football player

Personal information
- Full name: Jules Yves Stephane Baga
- Date of birth: June 14, 1987 (age 39)
- Place of birth: Yaoundé, Cameroon
- Height: 1.85 m (6 ft 1 in)
- Position: Striker

Team information
- Current team: Eding Sport

Youth career
- 2001–2005: Poumie Football Academy

Senior career*
Years	Team	Apps	(Gls)
2006–2008	Chonburi		
2008–2009	Zorya Luhansk	18	(1)
2010–2011	Chonburi	27	(3)
2011	Persidafon		
2012–2013	Songkhla United	22	(3)
2014	Chainat Hornbill	14	(2)
2015	Krabi	17	(6)
2016–2017	UMS de Loum		
2017–	Eding Sport		

International career
	Cameroon U20	8	(3)
- * Club domestic league appearances and goals

Jules Yves Stephane Baga (born 14 June 1987 in Yaoundé) is a Cameroonian football player, who plays for Eding Sport FC.

== Honours ==
- Chonburi - 2007 Thailand Premier League
- Chonburi - 2010 Thai FA Cup
