= Princess Sirindhorn Stadium =

Sports stadium in Si Racha, Thailand

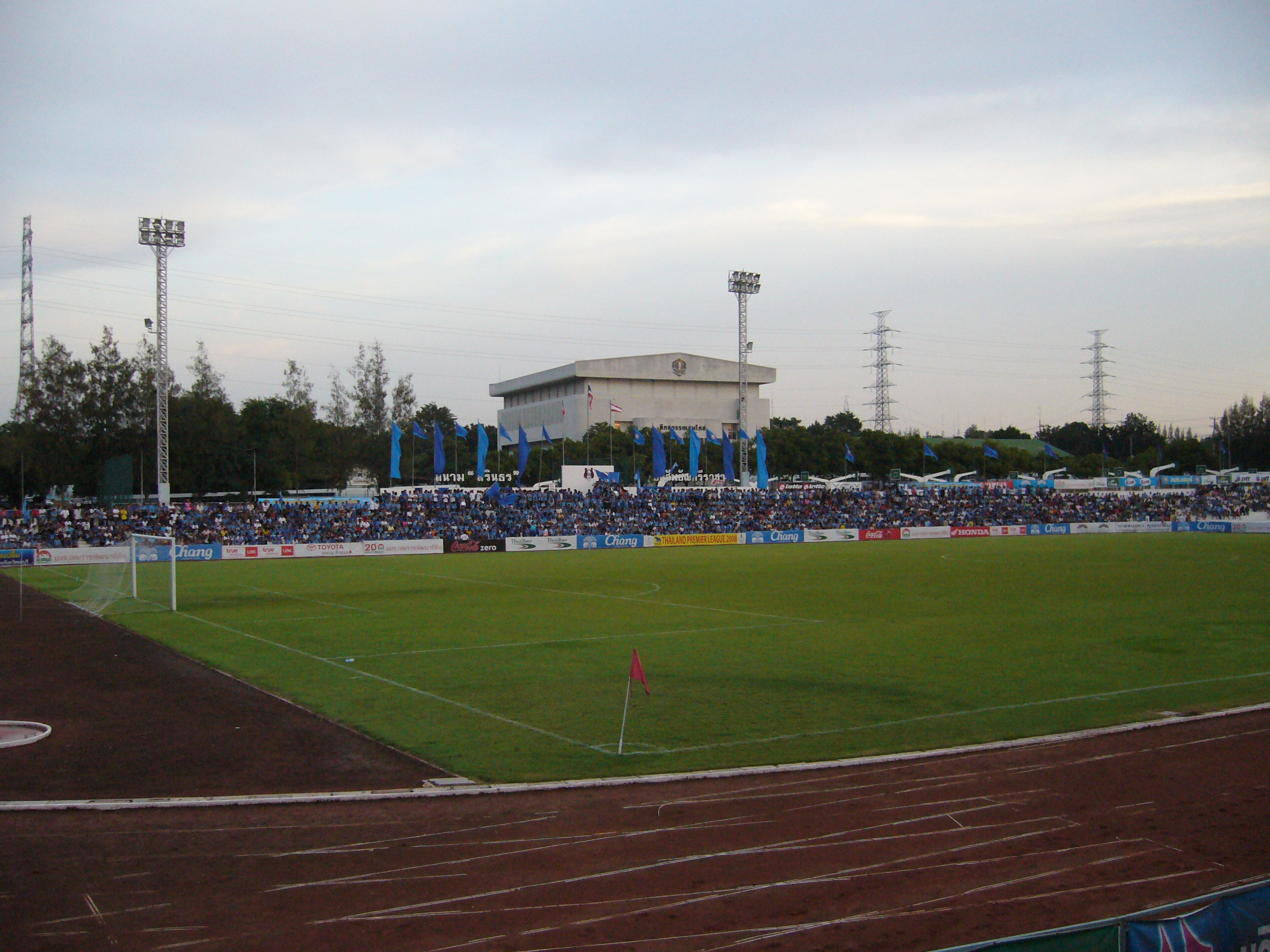
- Princess Sirindhorn Stadium in 2008
- Interactive map of Princess Sirindhorn Stadium
- Former names: Assumption College Sriracha Stadium
- Location: Si Racha, Chonburi, Thailand
- Coordinates: 13°09′49″N 100°56′25″E
- Owner: Assumption College Sriracha
- Operator: Assumption College Sriracha
- Capacity: 8,000
- Surface: Grass

Princess Sirindhorn Stadium (Thai: สนามกีฬาสิรินธร or สนามกีฬาอัสสัมชัญศรีราชา) is a sports stadium in Si Racha, Chonburi Province, Thailand. Named after Princess Sirindhorn, Princess Royal of Thailand, the stadium currently used mostly for football matches. It is the former home stadium of Sriracha FC and before that of Chonburi FC. The stadium has a capacity of 8,000. It is located near the city centre, on the ground of the Assumption College Sriracha. As well as a football field, the stadium has a running track, a common feature of stadiums in Thailand. It is fitted with floodlights, enabling evening matches to be played.
