= Jirawat Kaewboran =

Thai footballer

Personal information
- Full name: Jirawat Kaewboran
- Date of birth: November 13, 1981 (age 44)
- Place of birth: Loei, Thailand
- Height: 1.74 m (5 ft 8 1/2 in)
- Position: Striker

Senior career*
Years	Team	Apps	(Gls)
2001–2004	Bangkok University	35	(6)
2006–2010	Samutsongkhram	95	(23)
2011–2012	Chanthaburi	0	(0)
2013	Samutsongkhram	7	(0)
2014–2015	Phang Nga	19	(2)
- * Club domestic league appearances and goals as of 22 June 2008

Jirawat Kaewboran (Thai จิรวัฒน์ แก้วโบราณ) is a Thai retired footballer.
