= Pichet In-bang =

Thai footballer

Personal information
- Full name: Pichet In-bang
- Date of birth: 25 December 1982 (age 43)
- Place of birth: Ratchaburi, Thailand
- Height: 1.72 m (5 ft 7 1/2 in)
- Positions: Forward; attacking midfielder

Youth career
- 2000–2001: Ratchaburi

Senior career*
Years	Team	Apps	(Gls)
2002–2004	Ratchaburi	31	(11)
2005–2008	Nakhon Pathom	55	(14)
2009	Muangthong United	6	(1)
2009	Sriracha	8	(0)
2010	Samut Songkhram	7	(1)
2010	Police United	26	(6)
2011	Suphanburi	12	(9)
2012–2013	BBCU	19	(10)
2014	Sisaket	7	(5)
2014	PTT Rayong	9	(1)
2015	Port	3	(0)
2015	Udon Thani	6	(1)
2016	Nonthaburi	10	(1)
2016	Rayong	8	(3)
2017	Nonthaburi	5	(1)
2017	Rayong	6	(0)
Total		218	(64)
- * Club domestic league appearances and goals as of 22 June 2008

Pichet In-bang (Thai พิเชษฐ์ อินทร์บาง) is a Thai retired footballer who played as a forward and attacking midfielder. Previously he played in the Thai League 1 for several clubs.
