= Rangsan Roobmoh =

Thai footballer

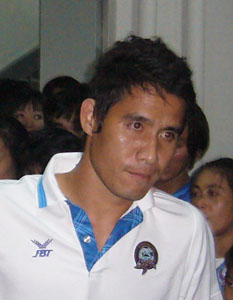

Personal information
- Full name: Rangsan Roobmoh
- Date of birth: 11 June 1982 (age 44)
- Place of birth: Sakon Nakhon, Thailand
- Height: 1.92 m (6 ft 3 1/2 in)
- Position: Striker

Senior career*
Years	Team	Apps	(Gls)
2007–2008	Thai Airways	37	(17)
2009–2010	Pattaya United	14	(1)
2010	→ Chonburi (loan)	2	(0)
2011	RBAC		
2012	Rayong United		
2012	Wuachon United	2	(1)
2013	Air Force Central		
2014	Udon Thani	12	(1)
- * Club domestic league appearances and goals as of 28 June 2008

Rangsan Roobmoh (Thai: รังสันติ์ รูปเหมาะ) is a Thai retired footballer.

Roobmoh has previously played for Pattaya United in Thai Premier League.
