= Gorka Unda =

Spanish footballer

Personal information
- Full name: Gorka José Unda Velasco
- Date of birth: 16 June 1987 (age 39)
- Place of birth: Madrid, Spain
- Height: 1.79 m (5 ft 10 1/2 in)
- Position: Midfielder

Team information
- Current team: Chainat Hornbill
- Number: 8

Youth career
- Rayo Majadahonda

Senior career*
Years	Team	Apps	(Gls)
2006–2007	Rayo Majadahonda		
2007–2009	Real Madrid B	10	(0)
2009	→ Guadalajara (loan)	7	(0)
2009–2010	Real Madrid C	1	(0)
2010–2011	Getafe B	14	(0)
2011–2012	Rayo Majadahonda		
2012–2013	St. Pölten	32	(1)
2013–2014	Rayo Majadahonda	16	(0)
2014	Sisaket	35	(3)
2015	Port	33	(5)
2016	Khon Kaen United	3	(0)
2017	Songkhla United	13	(1)
2017	Chainat Hornbill	14	(1)
2018	Angthong		
2019–	Chainat Hornbill	4	(0)
- * Club domestic league appearances and goals

Gorka José Unda Velasco (born 16 June 1987 in Madrid) is a Spanish professional footballer who plays for Thai club Angthong FC as a midfielder.
