= Pongpipat Kamnuan =

Thai footballer (born 1983)

Personal information
- Full name: Pongpipat Kamnuan
- Date of birth: 19 March 1983 (age 43)
- Place of birth: Nakhon Phanom, Thailand
- Height: 1.75 m (5 ft 9 in)
- Position: Left back

Senior career*
Years	Team	Apps	(Gls)
2009–2012	Thai Port	31	(2)
2013	Bangkok United	11	(0)
2014	Samut Songkhram	17	(0)
2015–2016	Port	4	(0)
2016	Nakhon Phanom	16	(0)
Total		79	(2)
- * Club domestic league appearances and goals

Pongpipat Kamnuan (Thai: พงศ์พิพัฒน์ คำนวณ; born March 19, 1983) is a former professional footballer from Thailand.

== Honours ==
=== Club ===
Thai Port F.C.

- Thai FA Cup winner (1) : 2009
- Thai League Cup winner (1) : 2010
