= 2010 Police United F.C. season =

Police United
2010 season
- Chairman: Worrapong Chewpreecha
- Manager: Chaiyong Kumpiam
- Thai Premier League: 11th
- FA Cup: Third Round
- Queen's Cup: Runner Up
- League Cup: Second Round
| Home colours | Away colours |

The 2010 season was Police United's 8th season in the top division of Thai football. This article shows statistics of the club's players in the season, and also lists all matches that the club played in the season.

== Chronological list of events ==
- '26 November 2009: Police announce that they will re-locate to the Thammasat Stadium in Rangsit for the 2010 campaign
- 10 November 2009: The Thai Premier League 2010 season first leg fixtures were announced.
- 14 July 2010: Police United were knocked out by TTM Phichit in the FA Cup third round.
- 22 September 2010: Police United were knocked out by Osotspa Saraburi in the League Cup second round.
- 24 October 2010: Police United finished in 11th place in the Thai Premier League.

== Current squad ==
Note: Flags indicate national team as defined under FIFA eligibility rules; some limited exceptions apply. Players may hold more than one non-FIFA nationality.

| No. | Pos. | Nation | Player |
|---|---|---|---|
| 3 | DF | THA | Krissadee Prakobkong |
| 4 | DF | KOR | Whoo Hyun |
| 5 | DF | THA | Payungsak Pannarat |
| 6 | MF | JPN | Takahiro Kawamura |
| 7 | DF | THA | Pradit Sawangsri |
| 8 | MF | THA | Tanapat Na Tarue |
| 9 | FW | THA | Surachart Sareepim |
| 10 | MF | THA | Narongchai Vachiraban (captain) |
| 11 | FW | THA | Pichet In-bang |
| 12 | DF | NGA | Amara Jerry |
| 13 | FW | KOR | Lee Ho-Jin |
| 14 | MF | THA | Nimit Chuayted |
| 15 | FW | KOR | Lee Seung Hyun |
| 16 | MF | THA | Wutthipan Pantalee |
| 17 | FW | THA | Nantawat Tansopa |
| 18 | GK | THA | Chalermkiat Sombutpan |
| 19 | DF | THA | Mongkol Namnuad |

| No. | Pos. | Nation | Player |
|---|---|---|---|
| 20 | MF | BRA | Felipe |
| 21 | MF | THA | Jakkraphan Pornsai |
| 22 | MF | THA | Ek-arthit Somjit |
| 23 | DF | THA | Saranyu Intaraat |
| 24 | DF | THA | Arnisong Jarerntham |
| 26 | GK | THA | Intharat Apinyakool |
| 25 | MF | THA | Surapong Thammawongsa |
| 27 | MF | THA | Singkorn Mungkud |
| 29 | FW | THA | Jatuchok Viriyapongchai |
| 30 | MF | THA | Decha Sa-ardchom |
| 31 | GK | THA | Sompong Yod-ard |
| 32 | FW | THA | Chakrit Buathong |
| 33 | DF | KOR | Won Chang Seung |
| 34 | MF | THA | Assaming Mae |
| 35 | GK | THA | Narathip Phanprom |
| -- | FW | THA | Chayanan Pombuppha |

== Results ==
=== Thai Premier League ===
| 24 March 2010 | Bangkok Glass | 1 - 0 | Police United | Thanyaburi |
| | | | | Stadium: Leo Stadium; Attendance: 7,000; Referee: Porrached Wongkamdee |

| 28 March 2010 | Police United | 1 - 1 | Bangkok United | Bangkok |
| | | | | Stadium: Thammasat Rangsit Stadium |

| 3 April 2010 | Thai Port | 3 - 2 | Police United | Thanyaburi |
| | | | | Stadium: Leo Stadium; Referee: Prathan Nasawang |

| 11 April 2010 | Police United | 1 - 2 | Samut Songkhram | Bangkok |
| | | | | Stadium: Thammasat Rangsit Stadium |

| 17 April 2010 | Police United | 1 - 2 | BEC Tero Sasana | Bangkok |
| | | | | Stadium: Thammasat Rangsit Stadium; Referee: Atthakorn Wetchakan |

| 25 April 2010 | Sisaket | 2 - 4 | Police United | Sisaket |
| | | | | Stadium: Sri Nakhon Lamduan Stadium |

| 2 May 2010 | Police United | 1 - 0 | TOT-CAT | Bangkok |
| | | | | Stadium: Thammasat Rangsit Stadium |

| 9 May 2010 | Rajnavy Rayong | 1 - 0 | Police United | Rayong |
| | Somjet 30' | | | Stadium: Rayong Stadium; Referee: Chaiya Mahapab |

| 23 May 2010 | Police United | 0 - 0 | Royal Thai Army | Bangkok |
| | | | | Stadium: Thammasat Rangsit Stadium; Referee: Apisit Aonrak |

| 6 June 2010 | TTM Phichit | 0 - 1 | Police United | Phichit |
| | | | | Stadium: Phichit Stadium |

| 12 June 2010 | Pattaya United | 2 - 0 | Police United | Pattaya |
| | | | | Stadium: Pattaya Stadium |

| 19 June 2010 | Police United | 0 - 4 | Chonburi | Pathumthani |
| | | | | Stadium: Thammasat Stadium |

| 27 June 2010 | Osotspa Saraburi | 2 - 1 | Police United | Saraburi |
| | | | | Stadium: M-150 Saraburi Stadium |

| 3 July 2010 | Police United | 1 - 1 | Buriram PEA | Pathumthani |
| | | | | Stadium: Thammasat Stadium |

| 10 July 2010 | Police United | 1 - 0 | Muangthong United | Pathumthani |
| | | | | Stadium: Thammasat Stadium |

| 18 July 2010 | Police United | 3 - 2 | Bangkok Glass | Pathumthani |
| | | | | Stadium: Thammasat Stadium |

| 24 July 2010 | Bangkok United | 0 - 4 | Police United | Bangkok |
| | | | | Stadium: Thai-Japanese Stadium |

| 28 July 2010 | Police United | 0 - 1 | Thai Port | Pathumthani |
| | | | | Stadium: Thammasat Stadium |

| 7 August 2010 | Samut Songkhram | 1 - 1 | Police United | Samut Songkhram |
| | | | | Stadium: Samut Songkhram Stadium |

| 14 August 2010 | BEC Tero Sasana | 2 - 0 | Police United | Bangkok |
| | | | | Stadium: Thephasadin Stadium |

| 18 August 2010 | Police United | 0 - 1 | Sisaket | Pathumthani |
| | | | | Stadium: Thammasat Stadium |

| 21 August 2010 | TOT-CAT | 0 - 2 | Police United | Nonthaburi |
| | | | | Stadium: Yamaha Stadium |

| 11 September 2010 | Muangthong United | 1 - 0 | Police United | Nonthaburi |
| | | | | Stadium: Yamaha Stadium |

| 19 September 2010 | Royal Thai Army | 1 - 2 | Police United | Bangkok |
| | | | | Stadium: Thai Army Sports Stadium |

| 26 September 2010 | Police United | 4 - 1 | TTM Phichit | Pathumthani |
| | | | | Stadium: Thammasat Stadium |

| 29 September 2010 | Police United | 2 - 2 | Pattaya United | Pathumthani |
| | | | | Stadium: Thammasat Stadium |

| 3 October 2010 | Chonburi | 3 - 3 | Police United | Chonburi |
| 18.oo UTC+7 | Ekaphan 44'; Suree 45'; Phuritad 90'; Cholratit (red card) 90' | | Chakrit 11', 49', 59' | Stadium: IPE Chonburi Stadium |

| 10 October 2010 | Police United | 2 - 3 | Rajnavy Rayong | Pathumthani |
| | | | | Stadium: Thammasat Stadium |

| 17 October 2010 | Police United | 1 - 2 | Osotspa Saraburi | Pathumthani |
| | | | | Stadium: Thammasat Stadium |

| 24 October 2010 | Buriram PEA | 4 - 2 | Police United | Buriram |
| | | | | Stadium: Chang Arena |

==== League table ====
| Pos | Team | Pld | W | D | L | GF | GA | GD | Pts |
|---|---|---|---|---|---|---|---|---|---|
| 9 | BEC Tero Sasana | 30 | 9 | 8 | 13 | 39 | 42 | −3 | 35 |
| 10 | Rajnavy Rayong | 30 | 8 | 9 | 13 | 35 | 52 | −17 | 33 |
| 11 | Police United | 30 | 9 | 6 | 15 | 40 | 45 | −5 | 33 |
| 12 | TOT-CAT | 30 | 9 | 6 | 15 | 23 | 42 | −19 | 33 |
| 13 | TTM Phichit | 30 | 7 | 11 | 12 | 32 | 46 | −14 | 32 |

Updated to match(es) played on 24 October 2010. Source: FIFA.com
Rules for classification: 1st points; 2nd head-to-head; 3rd match win; 4th goal difference; 5th number of goals scored

=== FA Cup ===
==== Third round ====
| 14 July 2010 | TTM Phichit | 0 - 0 (2 - 1 a.e.t) | Police United | Phichit |
| | Jetsada B. 96'; Kraikitti 118' | Report | Krissadee P. 114' | Stadium: Phichit Stadium |

=== League Cup ===
==== First round ====
===== 1st leg =====
| 28 August 2010 | Nakhon Sawan Rajabhat University | 0 - 1 | Police United | Bangkok |
| | | | | Stadium: Nakhon Sawan Rajabhat University Stadium |

===== 2nd leg =====
| 1 September 2010 | Police United | 1 - 0 | Nakhon Sawan Rajabhat University | Bangkok |
| | | | | Stadium: Thephasadin Stadium |

==== Second round ====
===== 1st leg =====
| 15 September 2010 | Police United | 1 - 1 | Osotspa Saraburi | Bangkok |
| | | | | Stadium: Thammasat Stadium |

===== 2nd leg =====
| 22 September 2010 | Osotspa Saraburi | 7 - 3 | Police United | Saraburi |
| | | | | Stadium: Saraburi Stadium |

=== Queen's Cup ===
| 7 February 2010 | Police United | 2 – 2 | Rajnavy Rayong | Rayong Stadium, Rayong |
| 18:30 UTC+7 | Ek-arthit 47'; Nantawat 48' | | Suttinan 71'; Tinnapob 88' |

| 9 February 2010 | Police United | 1 – 0 | TOT | Rayong Stadium, Rayong |
| 16:00 UTC+7 | Surapong 38' |

| 11 February 2010 | Hakka-Sriracha | 1 – 0 | Police United | Rayong Stadium, Rayong |
| 16:00 UTC+7 | Beckenbauer 44' |

| 13 February 2010 | BEC Tero Sasana | 0 – 1 | Police United | Nongprue Municipality Stadium, Chonburi |
| 18:00 UTC+7 | | Report | Assaming 61' |

| 16 February 2010 | Police United | 1 – 0 | Chonburi | Chonburi |
| 17:00 UTC+7 | Nantawat 8' | | | Stadium: IPE Chonburi Stadium |

| 18 February 2010 | Police United | 1 – 4 | Krung Thai Bank-BG | Chonburi |
| 17:00 UTC+7 | Tanapat 62' | | Paul 48'; Anawin 53', 69'; Ajayi 75' | Stadium: IPE Chonburi Stadium |
