= 2010 Rajnavy Rayong F.C. season =

Rajnavy Rayong
2010 season
- Chairman: Chatcharin Chusri
- Manager: Jirawat seamritthirong
- Thai Premier League: 10th
- Queen's Cup: Semi-final
| Home colours | Away colours |

The 2010 season was Rajnavy's eighth season in the top division of Thai football. This article shows statistics of the club's players in the season, and also lists all matches that the club played in the season.

== Chronological list of events ==
- 10 November 2009: The Thai Premier League 2010 season first leg fixtures were announced.
- 24 October 2010: Rajnavy Rayong finished in 10th place in the Thai Premier League.

== Current squad ==
Updated 7 January 2010 Note: Flags indicate national team as defined under FIFA eligibility rules; some limited exceptions apply. Players may hold more than one non-FIFA nationality.

| No. | Pos. | Nation | Player |
|---|---|---|---|
| 1 | GK | THA | Chinnakorn Deesai |
| 2 | MF | THA | Udorn Pimpak |
| 3 | DF | THA | Sarayut Kiewprae |
| 4 | DF | THA | Sarawut Jomkamsing |
| 5 | DF | THA | Suradej Saotaisong |
| 9 | FW | THA | Somjet Sattabud (captain) |
| 10 | FW | THA | Kongsak Santaweesook |
| 11 | MF | THA | Suttinan Nontee |
| 12 | MF | THA | Danusorn Puisangjan |
| 13 | DF | THA | Panuwat Kongchan |
| 14 | DF | CMR | Georges Yannick |
| 15 | DF | THA | Seksan Chaothonglang |
| 16 | DF | THA | Maroot Dokmalipar |
| 17 | DF | THA | Supachai Kamsab |

| No. | Pos. | Nation | Player |
|---|---|---|---|
| 18 | GK | THA | Sittipong Manaowarn |
| 19 | FW | THA | Wuttichai Asuweewa |
| 20 | FW | THA | Tinnapob Srisathit |
| 21 | MF | THA | Arthit Tabtimmai |
| 23 | DF | THA | Jetsada Ngam-muang (vice captain) |
| 24 | FW | THA | Rattaporn Saetan |
| 27 | MF | THA | Pisansil Za-in |
| 28 | MF | THA | Sangphet Hongviangchan |
| 29 | MF | THA | Somsong Khemla |
| -- | DF | BRA | Alex Avila |
| -- | MF | BRA | Vilson Dos Santos |
| -- | FW | CMR | Akabar Moussa |
| -- | MF | KOR | Kim Tae-Kung |
| -- | MF | KOR | Jang Jin-Young |

== Results ==
=== Thai Premier League ===
| 20 March 2010 | Rajnavy Rayong | 1–2 | TTM Phichit | Rayong |
| | | | | Stadium: Rayong Stadium; Referee: Atthakorn Wetchakan |

| 28 March 2010 | Pattaya United | 3–1 | Rajnavy Rayong | Pattaya |
| | | | | Stadium: Nongprue Municipality Football Field; Referee: Apisit Aonrak |

| 3 April 2010 | Muangthong United | 1–0 | Rajnavy Rayong | Nonthaburi |
| | | | | Stadium: Yamaha Stadium; Referee: Porached Wongkamdee |

| 10 April 2010 | Rajnavy Rayong | 4–3 | Sisaket | Rayong |
| | | | | Stadium: Rayong Stadium; Referee: Thaweep Inkaew |

| 24 April 2010 | Samut Songkhram | 1–0 | Rajnavy Rayong | Samut Songkhram Stadium, Samut Songkhram |

| 2 May 2010 | Rajnavy Rayong | 3–1 | BEC Tero Sasana | Rayong |
| | | | | Stadium: Rayong Stadium; Referee: Sura Sriart |

| 5 May 2010 | Thai Port | 3–0 | Rajnavy Rayong | Bangkok |
| | | | | Stadium: PAT Stadium; Referee: Thaweep Inkaew |

| 9 May 2010 | Rajnavy Rayong | 1–0 | Police United | Rayong |
| | | | | Stadium: Rayong Stadium; Referee: Chaiya Mahapab |

| 16 May 2010 | TOT-CAT | 1–0 | Rajnavy Rayong | Nonthaburi |
| | | | | Stadium: Yamaha Stadium |

| 22 May 2010 | Rajnavy Rayong | 0–0 | Buriram PEA | Rayong |
| | | | | Stadium: Rayong Stadium; Referee: Chaiya Mahapab |

| 5 June 2010 | Rajnavy Rayong | 0–4 | Chonburi | Rayong |
| | | | | Stadium: Rayong Stadium |

| 12 June 2010 | Bangkok United | 0–0 | Rajnavy Rayong | Bangkok |
| | | | | Stadium: Thai-Japanese Stadium; Referee: Apisit Aonrak |

| 19 June 2010 | Rajnavy Rayong | 1–2 | Osotspa Saraburi | Rayong |
| | | | | Stadium: Rayong Stadium; Referee: Sura Sriart |

| 26 June 2010 | Bangkok Glass | 5–0 | Rajnavy Rayong | Pathumthani |
| | | | | Stadium: Leo Stadium; Referee: Chaiya Mahapab |

| 4 July 2010 | Rajnavy Rayong | 2–1 | Royal Thai Army | Rayong |
| | | | | Stadium: Rayong Stadium; Referee: Prayoon Veerapoon |

| 17 July 2010 | TTM Phichit | 0–2 | Rajnavy Rayong | Phichit |
| | | | | Stadium: Phichit Stadium |

| 25 July 2010 | Rajnavy Rayong | 1–1 | Pattaya United | Rayong |
| | | | | Stadium: Rayong Stadium; Referee: Mongkolchai Phedsri |

| 28 July 2010 | Rajnavy Rayong | 1–2 | Muangthong United | Rayong |
| | | | | Stadium: Rayong Stadium; Referee: Apisit Aonrak |

| 7 August 2010 | Sisaket | 4–1 | Rajnavy Rayong | Sisaket |
| | | | | Stadium: Sri Nakhon Lamduan Stadium |

| 15 August 2010 | Rajnavy Rayong | 2–4 | Thai Port | Rayong |
| | | | | Stadium: Rayong Stadium; Referee: Thanom Burikut |

| 18 August 2010 | Rajnavy Rayong | 0–0 | Samut Songkhram | Rayong |
| | | | | Stadium: Rayong Stadium; Referee: Thaweep Inkaew |

| 25 August 2010 | BEC Tero Sasana | 0–0 | Rajnavy Rayong | Bangkok |
| | | | | Stadium: Thephasadin Stadium; Referee: Chaiya Mahapab |

| 12 September 2010 | Rajnavy Rayong | 3–2 | TOT-CAT | Rayong |
| 17.oo UTC+7 | | | | Stadium: Rayong Stadium; Referee: Thanom Burikut |

| 18 September 2010 | Buriram PEA | 4–2 | Rajnavy Rayong | Buriram |
| | | | | Stadium: i-mobile Stadium |

| 25 September 2010 | Chonburi | 1–1 | Rajnavy Rayong | Chonburi |
| 18.oo UTC+7 | | | | Stadium: IPE Chonburi Stadium; Referee: Thaweep Inkaew |

| 29 September 2010 | Rajnavy Rayong | 1–1 | Bangkok United | Rayong |
| 17.oo UTC+7 | | | | Stadium: Rayong Stadium |

| 3 October 2010 | Osotspa Saraburi | 1–1 | Rajnavy Rayong | Saraburi |
| | | | | Stadium: M-150 Saraburi Stadium |

| 10 October 2010 | Police United | 2–3 | Rajnavy Rayong | Pathumthani |
| | | | | Stadium: Thammasat Stadium |

| 17 October 2010 | Rajnavy Rayong | 3–3 | Bangkok Glass | Rayong |
| 17.oo UTC+7 | | | | Stadium: Rayong Stadium |

==== League table ====
| Pos | Team | Pld | W | D | L | GF | GA | GD | Pts |
|---|---|---|---|---|---|---|---|---|---|
| 8 | Samut Songkhram | 30 | 11 | 9 | 10 | 27 | 32 | −5 | 42 |
| 9 | BEC Tero Sasana | 30 | 9 | 8 | 13 | 39 | 42 | −3 | 35 |
| 10 | Rajnavy Rayong | 30 | 8 | 9 | 13 | 35 | 52 | −17 | 33 |
| 11 | Police United | 30 | 9 | 6 | 15 | 40 | 45 | −5 | 33 |
| 12 | TOT-CAT | 30 | 9 | 6 | 15 | 23 | 42 | −19 | 33 |

Updated to match(es) played on 24 October 2010. Source: FIFA.com
Rules for classification: 1st points; 2nd head-to-head; 3rd match win; 4th goal difference; 5th number of goals scored

=== FA Cup ===
==== Third round ====
| 7 July 2010 | Rajnavy Rayong | 0–0 (1–0 a.e.t) | Bangkok Glass | Rayong |
| | Somjet 115' | | Ney (red card) 100' | Stadium: Rayong Stadium; Referee: Nittipoom Kunlabut |

==== Fourth round ====
| 7 September 2010 | Rajnavy Rayong | 3–1 | Bangkok United | Rayong |
| | Suttinan N. 16'; Somjet 28', 90+5' | | Wutthipong 45+3'; Patiparn (red card) 90+2' | Stadium: Rayong Stadium; Referee: Chaiya Mahapab |

==== Quarter-final ====
| 15 September 2010 | Rajnavy Rayong | 2–1 | Sisaket | Rayong |
| | | | | Stadium: Rayong Stadium |

=== League Cup ===
==== First round ====
===== 1st leg =====
| 28 August 2010 | Phetchaburi | 1–1 | Rajnavy Rayong | Phetchaburi |
| | | | | Stadium: Phechaburi Stadium |

===== 2nd leg =====
| 1 September 2010 | Rajnavy Rayong | 0–0 | Phetchaburi | Rayong |
| | | | | Stadium: Rayong Stadium |

==== Second round ====
===== 1st leg =====
| 22 September 2010 | Nakhon Pathom | 2–3 | Rajnavy Rayong | Nakhon Pathom |
| | | | | Stadium: Nakhon Pathom Stadium |

===== 2nd leg =====
| 6 October 2010 | Rajnavy Rayong | 3–1 | Nakhon Pathom | Rayong |
| | | | | Stadium: Rayong Stadium |

==== Third round ====
===== 1st leg =====
| 20 October 2010 | Sriracha | 0–3 | Rajnavy Rayong | Chonburi |
| | | | | Stadium: Princess Sirindhorn Stadium |

===== 2nd leg =====
| 27 October 2010 | Rajnavy Rayong | v | Sriracha | Rayong |
| | | | | Stadium: Rayong Stadium |

=== Queen's Cup ===
| 7 February 2010 | Police United | 2 – 2 | Rajnavy Rayong | Rayong Stadium, Rayong |
| 18:30 UTC+7 | Ek-arthit 47'; Nantawat 48' | | Suttinan 71'; Tinnapob 88' |

| 9 February 2010 | Hakka-Sriracha | 1 – 3 | Rajnavy Rayong | Rayong Stadium, Rayong |
| 18:30 UTC+7 | Sanou 9' | | Somjet 23'; Alex 44'; Suttinan 87' (pen.) |

| 11 February 2010 | Rajnavy Rayong | 0 – 1 | TOT | Rayong Stadium, Rayong |
| 18:30 UTC+7 | | | Miloslav 56' |

| 13 February 2010 | Rajnavy Rayong | 2 – 2 (a.e.t.) (10 – 9 p) | Pattaya United | Rayong Stadium, Rayong |
| 18:00 UTC+7 | Suttinan 46', 56' | Report | Patiphon 25'; Ludovick 50' |

| 16 February 2010 | Rajnavy Rayong | 1 – 2 | Krung Thai Bank-BG | Chonburi |
| 19:00 UTC+7 | Wuttichai 52' | | Ney Fabiano 28'; Supachai 89' | Stadium: IPE Chonburi Stadium |
