= 2007 Hassanal Bolkiah Trophy =

Tournament details
- Host country: Brunei
- Dates: 3–12 March
- Teams: 8
- Venues: 3 (in 1 host city)

Final positions
- Champions: Thailand (2nd title)
- Runners-up: Myanmar
- Third place: Cambodia; Malaysia (shared)

Tournament statistics
- Matches played: 15
- Goals scored: 65 (4.33 per match)

The 2007 Hassanal Bolkiah Trophy is the third edition of the invitational tournament hosted by Brunei. The tournament take place in Brunei from 3–12 March 2007. Eight teams from the ASEAN Football Federation participate in the tournament for under the age of 22.

Thailand emerged as the champion after beating Myanmar by 5–4 in the final penalty shoot-out, while both Cambodia and Malaysia shared the third place.

== Venues ==
Hassanal Bolkiah National Stadium	Berakas Sports Complex	Track & Field Sports Complex
4°55′44″N 114°56′42″E	4.9369°N 114.9400°E	4.9312280°N 114.9470584°E
Capacity: 30,000	Capacity: 5,000	Capacity: 1,700

== Group stage ==
- All times are Brunei Darussalam Time (BNT) – UTC+8.

=== Tie-breaking criteria ===
The teams are ranked according to points (3 points for a win, 1 point for a tie, 0 points for a loss) and tie breakers are in following order:

1. Greater number of points obtained in the group matches between the teams concerned;
2. Goal difference resulting from the group matches between the teams concerned;
3. Greater number of goals scored in the group matches between the teams concerned;
4. Result of direct matches;
5. Drawing of lots.

=== Group A ===
Team	Pld	W	D	L	GF	GA	GD	Pts
Thailand	3	3	0	0	11	1	+10	9
Malaysia	3	1	1	1	4	5	−1	4
Vietnam	3	0	2	1	1	6	−5	2
Singapore	3	0	1	2	0	4	−4	1

4 March
20:00 UTC+8

Singapore	0 – 2	Thailand
	Report	Sakarin 50'; Anawin 87'

Berakas Sports Complex, Bandar Seri Begawan
4 March
20:00 UTC+8

Malaysia	1 – 1	Vietnam
Fakri 57'	Report	Đào Công Luân 90+2'

Track & Field Sports Complex, Bandar Seri Begawan

6 March
20:00 UTC+8

Malaysia	1 – 4	Thailand
Nazrin 60'	Report	Alef 24'; Sakarin 35'; Anawin 69'; Supachai 72'

Berakas Sports Complex, Bandar Seri Begawan
6 March
20:00 UTC+8

Vietnam	0 – 0	Singapore
	Report

Track & Field Sports Complex, Bandar Seri Begawan

8 March

Singapore	0 – 2	Malaysia
	Report	Akmal 39'; Ahmad Aminuddin 47'

Berakas Sports Complex, B. S. Begawan
8 March

Thailand	5 – 0	Vietnam
Đinh Vũ Hàn Phong 3' (o.g.); Wisoot 5' (pen.); Choklap 12', 87'; Chainarong 78'	Report

Track & Field Sports Complex, B. S. Begawan

=== Group B ===
Team	Pld	W	D	L	GF	GA	GD	Pts
Myanmar	3	3	0	0	19	2	+17	9
Cambodia	3	1	1	1	8	9	−1	4
Brunei	3	1	1	1	6	7	−1	4
Philippines	3	0	0	3	3	18	−15	0

3 March

Myanmar	9 – 1	Philippines
Hla Aye Htwe 3', 14'; Si Thu Than 27', 66'; Htoo Kyaw 34'; Yaza Win Thein 60'; Zaw Htet Aung 69'; Pyae Phyo Oo 76'; Ye Wai Yan Soe 84'	Report	P. Younghusband 46'

Berakas Sports Complex, B. S. Begawan
3 March

Brunei	2 – 2	Cambodia
Khairol Anwar 15'; Najib 18'	Report	Chhaya 25'; Sokumpheak 71'

Hassanal Bolkiah National Stadium, B. S. Begawan

5 March

Philippines	2 – 3	Brunei
Fabroada 4'; P. Younghusband 42' (pen.)	Report	Helmi 84'; Abdul Hafiz 88'; Kamarul Ariffin 90'

Berakas Sports Complex, B. S. Begawan
5 March

Cambodia	0 – 7	Myanmar
	Report	Si Thu Than 29'; Aung Myo Thet 32', 56'; Htoo Kyaw 67'; Pyae Phyo Oo 68', 73'; Ye Wai Yan Soe 75'

Track & Field Sports Complex, B. S. Begawan

7 March

Myanmar	3 – 1	Brunei
Si Thu Than 29'; Pyae Phyo Oo 68', 73'; Kyaw Htay Oo 78'	Report	Aung Kyaw Oo 88' (o.g.)

Berakas Sports Complex, B. S. Begawan
7 March

Philippines	0 – 6	Cambodia
	Report	Chhaya 10', 73', 86'; Sokumpheak 23'; Sopheaknimoul 32'; Gustilo 41' (o.g.)

Track & Field Sports Complex, B. S. Begawan

== Knockout stage ==
Semi-finals
10 March – B. S. Begawan
Thailand	10
Cambodia	1
20 March – B. S. Begawan
Myanmar	2
Malaysia	0

Final
12 March – B. S. Begawan
Thailand	0 (5)
Myanmar	0 (4)

=== Semi-finals ===
10 March
20:00 UTC+8

Thailand	10 – 1	Cambodia
Pollawut 4'; Anawin 39', 66'; Wisoot 42', 47', 57'; Naruphol 54'; Choklap 56'; Sakarin 73'; Chainarong 80'	Report	Chhaya 20'

Hassanal Bolkiah National Stadium, B. S. Begawan
10 March
20:00 UTC+8

Myanmar	2 – 0	Malaysia
Aung Myo Thet 21'; Si Thu Than 27'	Report

Hassanal Bolkiah National Stadium, B. S. Begawan

=== Final ===
13 March
20:15 UTC+8

Thailand	0 – 0 (a.e.t.)	Myanmar
	Report
Penalties
Wisoot Bunpeng (penalty missed); Supachai Phupa (penalty scored); Choklap Nilsang (penalty scored); Alef Poh-ji (penalty scored); Anawin Jujeen (penalty scored); Naruphol Ar-romsawa (penalty scored)	5 – 4	(penalty missed) Aung Myo Thet; (penalty scored) Khin Maung Lwin; (penalty scored) Yaza Win Thein; (penalty scored) Kyaw Htay Oo; (penalty scored) Moe Win; (penalty missed) Si Thu Than

Hassanal Bolkiah National Stadium
Referee: Hadiman Shahbuddin (Brunei)

Thailand
Myanmar

Thailand:
GK	1	Sompong Yod-Ard
DF	2	Supachai Phupa	(yellow card) 23'
DF	4	Anisong Chareantham
DF	5	Chokchai Chuchai (c)	(yellow card) 62'
DF	20	Chompoo Sangpo
MF	6	Alef Poh-ji	(yellow card) 109'
MF	7	Anawin Jujeen
MF	8	Wisoot Bunpeng
MF	16	Naruphol Ar-romsawa
FW	12	Pollawut Donjui
FW	17	Sakarin Chanyotha	(substituted off) 55'
Substitutes:
GK	18	Chayanon Arbsuwan
DF	19	Surachet Phupa
DF	23	Chalermsak Kaewsooktae
DF	25	Tanasak Srisai
FW	9	Choklap Nilsang	(substituted on) 55'
FW	10	Chainarong Tathong
FW	19	Suriasit Khunchan
Coach:
(Thailand) Kawin Kachendecha

Myanmar:
GK	1	Kyaw Zin Htet
DF	3	Moe Win (c)
DF	4	Zaw Htet Aung
DF	5	Khin Maung Lwin	(yellow card) 45+2'
DF	6	Kyaw Htay Oo
MF	7	Yaza Win Thein
MF	8	Aung Myo Thet	(yellow card) 7'
MF	9	Hla Aye Htwe	(substituted off) 75'
MF	13	Htoo Kyaw	(substituted off) 116'
FW	10	Si Thu Than	(yellow card) 103'
FW	16	Pyae Phyo Oo	(substituted off) 91'
Substitutes:
GK	18	Thiha Sithu
DF	2	Chan Chan	(substituted on) 116'
DF	12	Aye San
DF	15	Nay Win	(substituted on) 91'	(yellow card) 98'
MF	14	Aung Kyaw Oo
MF	17	Ye Wai Yan Soe	(substituted on) 75'	(yellow card) 94' (yellow-red card) 100'
FW	11	Paing Soe
Coach:
(Myanmar) Soe Myint Lwin

Man of the Match: Sompong Yod-Ard

2007 Hassanal Bolkiah Trophy
(Thailand)
Thailand
Second title

== Goalscorers ==
5 goals

- (Cambodia) Chan Chhaya
- (Myanmar) Pyae Phyo Oo
- (Myanmar) Si Thu Than

4 goals

- (Thailand) Anawin Jujeen
- (Thailand) Wisoot Bunpeng

3 goals

- (Myanmar) Aung Myo Thet
- (Thailand) Choklap Nilsang
- (Thailand) Sakarin Chanyotha

2 goals

- (Cambodia) Kouch Sokumpheak
- (Philippines) Phil Younghusband
- (Myanmar) Hla Aye Htwe
- (Myanmar) Htoo Kyaw
- (Myanmar) Ye Wai Yan Soe
- (Thailand) Chainarong Tathong

1 goal

- (Brunei) Abdul Hafiz Ahad
- (Brunei) Helmi Zambin
- (Brunei) Kamarul Ariffin Ramlee
- (Brunei) Khairul Anwar Yaakob
- (Brunei) Najib Tarif
- (Cambodia) Phea Sopheaknimoul
- (Malaysia) Ahmad Aminuddin Shaharudin
- (Malaysia) Akmal Noor
- (Malaysia) Fakri Saarani
- (Malaysia) Nazrin Baharudin
- (Myanmar) Kyaw Htay Oo
- (Myanmar) Yaza Win Thein
- (Myanmar) Zaw Htet Aung
- (Philippines) Eliezer Fabroada
- (Thailand) Alef Poh-ji
- (Thailand) Naruphol Ar-romsawa
- (Thailand) Supachai Phupa
- (Thailand) Pollawut Donjui
- (Vietnam) Đào Công Luân

Own goals

- (Myanmar) Aung Kyaw Oo (for Brunei)
- (Philippines) Francis Gustilo (for Cambodia)
- (Vietnam) Đinh Vũ Hàn Phong (for Thailand)

== Team statistics ==
As per statistical convention in football, matches decided in extra time are counted as wins and losses, while matches decided by penalty shoot-outs are counted as draws.

Pos	Team	Pld	W	D	L	GF	GA	GD
1	Thailand	5	4	1	0	21	2	+19
2	Myanmar	5	4	1	0	21	2	+19
3	Malaysia	4	1	1	2	4	7	−3
3	Cambodia	4	1	1	2	9	19	−10
4	Brunei	3	1	1	1	6	7	−1
5	Vietnam	3	0	2	1	1	6	−5
6	Singapore	3	0	1	2	0	4	−4
7	Philippines	3	0	0	3	3	18	−15
