= 2010 Queen's Cup Final =

Thai football cup championship match

- Event: 2010 Queen's Cup
Police United	Krung Thai Bank-BG
1	4
- Date: 18 February 2010
- Venue: IPE Chonburi Stadium, Chonburi
- Referee: Prathan Nasawang

The 2010 Queen's Cup Final was the final match of the 2010 Queen's Cup, the 34th season of the Queen's Cup. The match was played at IPE Chonburi Stadium on 18 February 2010. It was contested by Police United and Krung Thai Bank-BG.

For winning the cup, Krung Thai Bank-BG won 300,000 baht and Police United won 150,000 as the runner-up. The final and both semi-finals was broadcast live on Siamsport TV.

== Path to the final ==
Police United			Round	Krung Thai Bank-BG		
Police United	2–2	Rajnavy Rayong	Group stage	Krung Thai Bank-BG	7–1	Sinthana
Police United	1–0	TOT	Group stage	Raj-Vithi	0–4	Krung Thai Bank-BG
Hakka-Sriracha	1–0	Police United	Group stage	Chonburi	0–3	Krung Thai Bank-BG
BEC Tero Sasana	0–1	Police United	Quarter-final	Krung Thai Bank-BG	1–0	Royal Thai Army
Police United	1–0	Chonburi	Semi-final	Rajnavy Rayong	1–2	Krung Thai Bank-BG

== Match ==
=== Summary ===
The first half of the final was dominated by defense, ending in a scoreless tie. Shortly before halftime, an off-ball scuffle led to red cards for one player on each team, and the rest of the match was played 10-on-10.

The second half was more offensive; Samuel Ajayi subbed in for Krung Thai at the start of the half, and minutes later fed a pass to Paul Ekollo to take a 1-0 lead. After Krung Thai scored again five minutes later, Police got one back to make it 2-1. That was as close as Police would come; Krung Thai scored two more goals, including one by the subbed-in Ajayi, to reach the 4-1 final score.

=== Details ===
18 February 2010
18:00 UTC+7

Police United	1 – 4	Krung Thai Bank-BG
Tanapat 62'	Report	Paul 48'; Anawin 53', 69'; Ajayi 75'

IPE Chonburi Stadium, Chonburi
Referee: Prathan Nasawang

Police United	Krung Thai Bank-BG

POLICE UNITED:
GK	1	(Thailand) Chalermkiat Sombutpan
DF	5	(Thailand) Payungsak Pannarat	(red card) 41'
DF	3	(Thailand) Krissadee Prakobkong
DF	4	(Thailand) Anon Nanok (c)
MF	24	(Thailand) Arnisong Jarerntham	(yellow card) 88'
MF	25	(Thailand) Surapong Thammawongsa
MF	14	(Thailand) Nimit Chuayted		Substituted off
MF	8	(Thailand) Tanapat Na Tarue	(yellow card) 45'
MF	21	(Thailand) Jakkraphan Pornsai
FW	15	(Thailand) Manit Noywech		Substituted off
FW	9	(Thailand) Surachart Sareepim
Manager:
(Thailand) Chaiyong Kumpiam

KRUNG THAI BANK-BG:
GK	1	(Thailand) Kittisak Rawangpa
DF	6	(Thailand) Amnaj Kaewkiew (c)
DF	21	(Thailand) Panuwat Failai
DF	35	(Thailand) Tanongsak Prajakkata
DF	17	(Thailand) Supachai Komsilp
MF	7	(Thailand) Anon Boonsukco
MF	10	(Thailand) Sutee Suksomkit		(substituted off) 85'
MF	15	(Thailand) Anawin Jujeen
MF	11	(Thailand) Sarun Promkaew		(substituted off) 45'
FW	12	(Brazil) Ney Fabiano	(red card) 41'
FW	14	(Cameroon) Paul Ekollo	(yellow card) 43'
Manager:
(Thailand) Surachai Jaturapattarapong

MATCH RULES

- 90 minutes.
- 30 minutes of extra-time if necessary.
- Penalty shoot-out if scores still level.
- Maximum of three substitutions.
