= Supachai =

Supachai or Suphachai (Thai: ศุภชัย; from Sanskrit: śubha + jaya) is a Thai masculine given name. People with the name include:

- Supachai Kamsab, Thai footballer
- Supachai Komsilp, Thai footballer
- Supachai Koysub, Thai athlete
- Supachai Panitchpakdi, Thai politician
- Supachai Phupa, Thai footballer
- Supachai Tangwongsan, Thai computer scientist
- Suphachai Chearavanont, CEO of Charoen Pokphand Group
- Supachai Jaided, Thai footballer
- Suphachai Phosu, Thai politician
