= Helmi Zambin =

Bruneian footballer

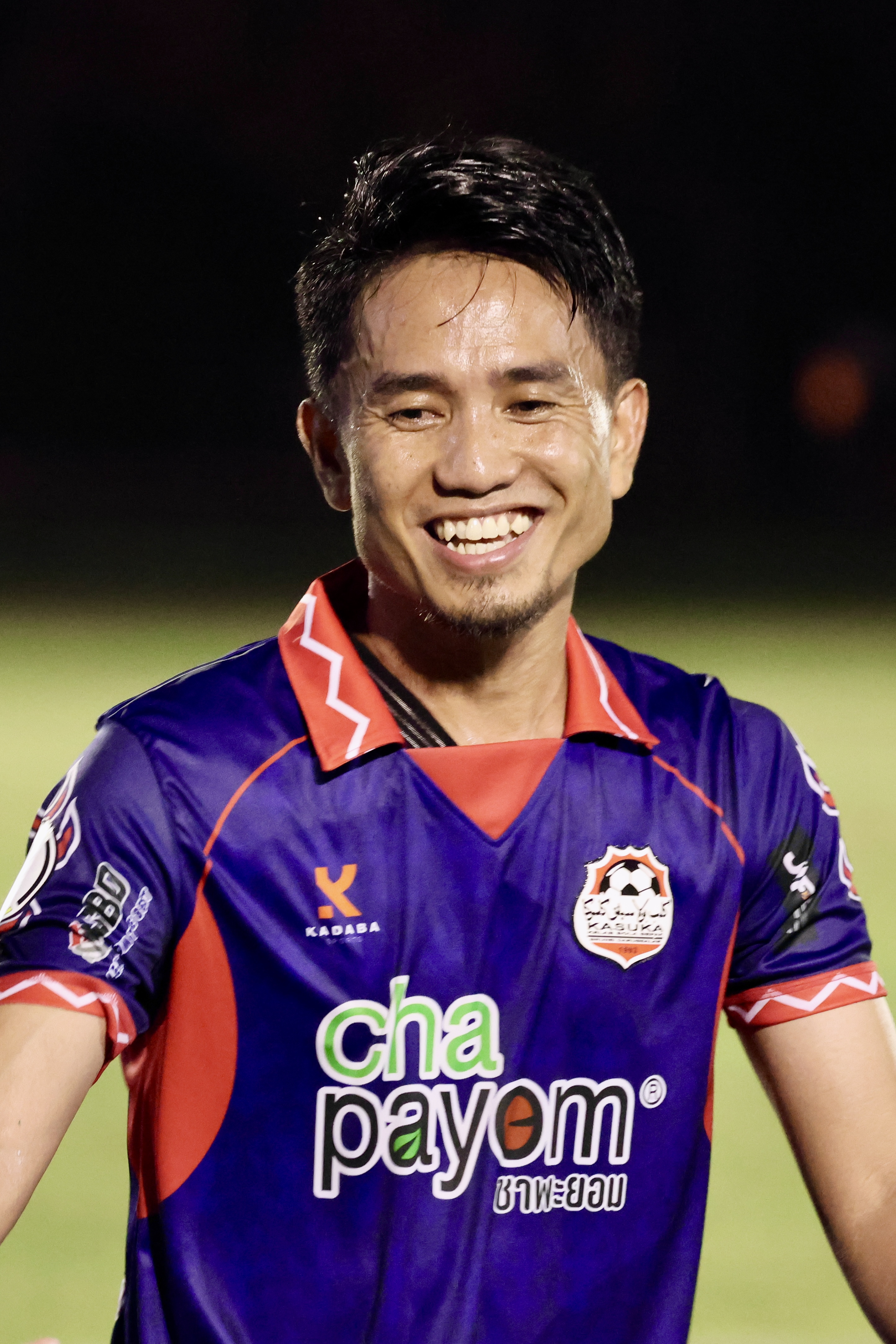
- Helmi with Kasuka in 2024

Personal information
- Full name: Mohammad Helmi bin Haji Zambin
- Date of birth: 30 March 1987 (age 39)
- Place of birth: Brunei
- Height: 1.64 m (5 ft 5 in)
- Positions: Midfielder; right-back

Team information
- Current team: Kasuka FC
- Number: 30

Senior career*
Years	Team	Apps	(Gls)
2004–2008	AH United		
2009–2024	DPMM	176	(4)
2010–2012	→ Indera (loan)		
2024–	Kasuka	12	(2)

International career^{‡}
2007	Brunei U21	2	(0)
2008	Brunei U23		
2008–2022	Brunei	17	(1)
- * Club domestic league appearances and goals as of 4 November 2026 ‡ National team caps and goals as of 10 October 2024

Mohammad Helmi bin Haji Zambin is a Bruneian footballer who plays as a right-sided full-back or midfielder for Kasuka FC of the Brunei Super League.

== Club career ==
Helmi began his career with AH United from 2004 to 2008. The following year he was selected to play for Brunei's sole professional club, DPMM FC. He went to Indera SC on loan for the two seasons the FIFA ban on Brunei was in effect.

After the appointment of Steve Kean, Helmi only made 5 appearances in the 2014 S.League. Kean converted him to a right-sided full-back in the following season to help him gain more playing time. He made 15 appearances as DPMM won their first S.League title.

With Rene Weber at the helm, Helmi established himself as the first-choice right-back for the club in the 2018 season. He scored his first league goal in five years slotting a rebound against Geylang International in a 2–6 victory on 10 June. With DPMM dominating the competition wherever they play, Helmi won the 2019 Singapore Premier League as well as the 2022 Brunei FA Cup playing for the royalty-owned club. He was released from the club on 7 February 2024, bringing an end to a 15-year affiliation.

Helmi subsequently signed for Kasuka FC who gained entry to the preliminary stage of the 2024–25 Shopee Cup as Bruneian league champions. He made his debut on 24 July 2024 as a substitute in the play-offs second leg against Shan United of Myanmar where the Bruneian club succumbed to a 3–1 defeat.

Helmi became a league champion with Kasuka at the 2024–25 Brunei Super League with an unbeaten record in 13 games. That run extended well until the final game of the 2025–26 season, a showdown between the two undefeated sides Kasuka and Indera SC. At the end of the game, Indera prevailed 3–2 over their more fancied opponents.

== International career ==
=== Youth ===
Helmi was selected for the Brunei under-21 team that competed in the 2007 Hassanal Bolkiah Trophy. He was a starter for the host's first match which was a 2–2 draw against Cambodia on 3 March 2007. Two days later against the Philippines, Helmi scored six minutes from time to spark a comeback for the Young Wasps and win the match 2–3 from 2–0 down after an equaliser from Abdul Hafiz Ahad and a winner through Kamarul Ariffin Ramlee just a minute into injury time.

Helmi made appearances for Brunei under-23 at the 2008 Sukma Games football tournament, netting the first goal in a 3–1 win against Sarawak.

=== Senior ===
Helmi made his full international debut for the Wasps in a 0–1 loss against the Philippines on 13 May 2008 at the 2008 AFC Challenge Cup qualification. He scored his first international goal against Cambodia in the group stage of the 2012 AFF Suzuki Cup qualification.

Helmi was a late addition to the Brunei national team squad for the 2016 AFC Solidarity Cup held in Kuching, Malaysia. He started the first match at right-back in a 4–0 win over Timor-Leste. He kept his place for the rest of the tournament, playing four games.

Helmi's consistent club form led to an international callup for the 2018 AFF Suzuki Cup qualification matches against Timor-Leste in early September. He started the first leg in Kuala Lumpur which was a 3–1 defeat to the Wasps. He kept his place at right-back seven days later in a 1–0 victory for Brunei, unfortunately the score was not enough for the Wasps to qualify for the Suzuki Cup tournament proper.

Helmi accepted another callup in June 2019 for the two-legged 2022 World Cup qualification matches against Mongolia, despite several of his teammates pulling out at late notice. He played at right-back for both matches, which resulted in a 2-3 aggregate loss and early elimination for Brunei.

His last involvement for the Wasps was in March 2022 for a friendly away against Laos where he was an unused substitute.

== International goals ==
Goal	Date	Venue	Opponent	Score	Result	Competition
1.	9 October 2012	Thuwunna Stadium, Yangon, Myanmar	Cambodia	2–1	3–2	2012 AFF Suzuki Cup qualification

== Honours ==
AH United

- Brunei FA Cup: 2005–06

DPMM

- S.League: 2014 runner-up, 2015
- Singapore Premier League: 2019
- Singapore League Cup: 2009, 2012, 2014
- Brunei FA Cup: 2022

Kasuka

- Brunei Super League: 2024–25
