= Phupa =

Phupa may be,

- Phupa language
- Supachai Phupa
- Surachet Phupa
