= Sawangsri =

Sawangsri is a surname. Notable people with the surname include:

- Pradit Sawangsri (born 1978), Thai footballer
- Rungroj Sawangsri (born 1981), Thai footballer
