= Beckenbauer (surname) =

Beckenbauer (German pronunciation: [ˈbɛkŋ̍ˌbaʊɐ]) is a German surname. The surname comes from Middle High German becke (baker) and būre/būr (farmer, villager), referring to a farmer who also worked as a baker. There are 144 people with this surname in Germany, mostly in Bavaria. Beckerbauer and Bäckerbauer are related surnames.

Notable people with the surname include:

- Franz Beckenbauer (1945–2024), German footballer
- Stephan Beckenbauer (1968–2015), German footballer, son of Franz Beckenbauer

== See also ==
- Franz Beckenbauer Cup, an annual friendly association football match
- Beckenbauer Seur-In (born 1980), Thai footballer
