= Seksan =

- Pronunciation: Thai: [seːk̚.san]
- Gender: Male
- Language: Thai

Origin
- Origin: Pali + Khmer
- Meaning: Choose to do as they want
- Region of origin: Thailand

Seksan is a Thai masculine first name and may refer to:

- Seksan Chaothonglang (born 1983), Thai footballer
- Seksan Piturat (born 1976), Thai footballer
- Seksan Prasertkul (born 1949), a student leader of the October 1973 uprising in Thailand
- Seksan Sukpimai (born 1974), (a.k.a. Sek Loso) the singer-guitarist of the Thai rock band Loso
