= Jimmy Fraser =

Australian retired football player

Personal information
- Full name: James Fraser
- Date of birth: 28 April 1948 (age 78)

Youth career
- Goalkeeper: Polonia 1969-1969

Senior career*
Years	Team	Apps	(Gls)
1970–1976	St. George Budapest		

International career
1973	Australia	8	(0)

Managerial career
- Balgownie
- Sydney FC (goalkeeping coach)
- 2014: Philippines U21
- 2015: Philippines U23
- 2022: Philippines (women) (goalkeeping coach)
- * Club domestic league appearances and goals

Jimmy Fraser (born 28 April 1948) is an Australian retired football (soccer) player. Fraser played ten matches for Australia.

== Playing career ==
Fraser played for 1st Dulwich Hill Scouts in the 1960s.

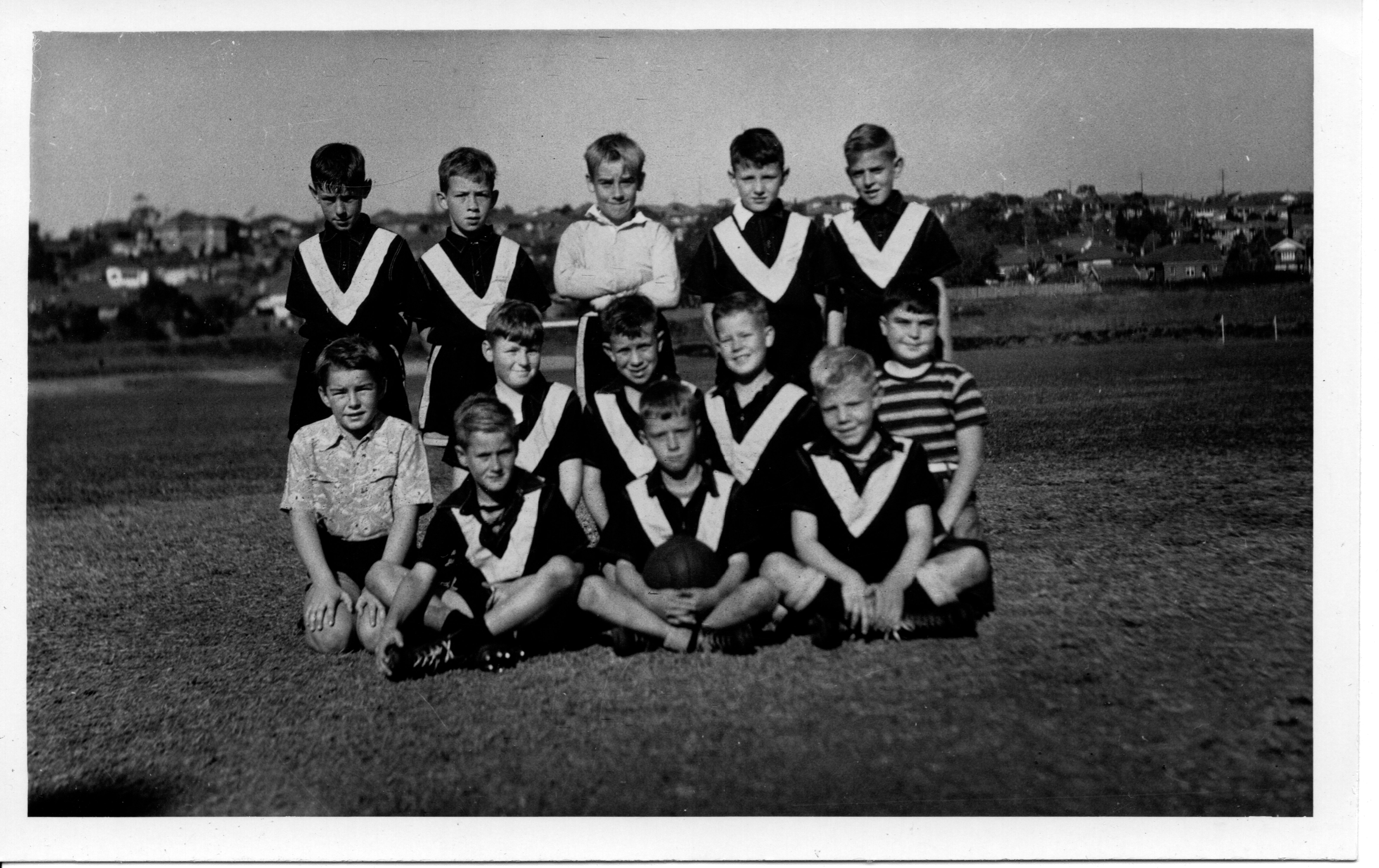

=== Club career ===
Fraser played forPolonia FC 1968-1969 St. George Budapest in the New South Wales first division between 1970 and 1976.

=== International career ===
Fraser played his ten matches for Australia in the qualification matches for the 1974 FIFA World Cup.Plus two A Internationals against Bulgaria Reresnted NSW 10 Appearances
