= Abdul Hafiz Ahad =

Bruneian footballer

Abdul Hafiz
Personal information
- Full name: Abdul Hafiz bin Ahad
- Date of birth: 21 March 1987 (age 39)
- Place of birth: Brunei
- Positions: Defender; midfielder

Senior career*
Years	Team	Apps	(Gls)
2007–2008	AM Gunners		
2024–2025	MS ABDB	4	(0)

International career^{‡}
2007	Brunei U21	3	(1)
2008	Brunei	3	(0)
- * Club domestic league appearances and goals as of 17 October 2025 ‡ National team caps and goals as of 22 October 2024

Bintara Abdul Hafiz bin Ahad (born 21 March 1987) is a Bruneian former footballer who played as a defender or midfielder.

== Career ==
In 2007, Abdul Hafiz played for AM Gunners, the Brunei Premier League club with links to Prince Mateen, winning the second tier championship. He was also a member of the Brunei under-21 team competing as hosts for the 2007 Hassanal Bolkiah Trophy, managing to score against the Philippines in his three appearances.

His league performances led to his selection for the Brunei national football team at the 2008 AFC Challenge Cup qualification matches held in the Philippines in May. Kwon Oh-son started Abdul Hafiz in all three matches, managing a 1–1 draw against Bhutan in between two defeats against the hosts and Tajikistan.

Abdul Hafiz returned to league football at the age of 37 playing for MS ABDB of the Brunei Super League in the 2024–25 season.

== Honours ==
- Brunei Premier League II: 2008
