= Naruphol Ar-romsawa =

Thai footballer (born 1988)

Personal information
- Full name: Naruphol Ar-romsawa
- Date of birth: 16 September 1988 (age 38)
- Place of birth: Kalasin, Thailand
- Height: 1.72 m (5 ft 8 in)
- Positions: Attacking midfielder; winger

Youth career
- 2003–2007: Assumption College Thonburi
- 2007–2008: Everton

Senior career*
| Years | Team | Apps | (Gls) |
| 2008–2009 | Home United | 43 | (6) |
| 2010–2011 | Muangthong United | 23 | (6) |
| 2012 | BEC Tero Sasana | 6 | (0) |
| 2012–2013 | Ratchaburi | 28 | (0) |
| 2014 | BEC Tero Sasana | 17 | (3) |
| 2015–2016 | Buriram United | 9 | (0) |
| 2016 | → Chonburi (loan) | 6 | (0) |
| 2017–2022 | Nakhon Ratchasima | 112 | (6) |
| 2022–2024 | Khon Kaen United | 18 | (0) |
| Total | | 262 | (21) |

International career
| 2005–2007 | Thailand U19 | 6 | (0) |
| 2010 | Thailand U23 | 4 | (0) |
| 2010 | Thailand | 2 | (0) |
- * Club domestic league appearances and goals

Naruphol Ar-romsawa (Thai: นฤพล อารมณ์สวะ, born September 16, 1988), simply known as Duong (Thai: ดวง), is a Thai former professional footballer who plays as an attacking midfielder.

== International career ==
Naruphol is a part of Thailand's squad in the 2010 AFF Suzuki Cup.

=== International ===
As of 12 November 2015

| National team | Year | Apps | Goals |
|---|---|---|---|
| Thailand | 2010 | 2 | 0 |
| Thailand | Total | 2 | 0 |

== Honours ==
=== Club ===
Buriram United

- Thai League 1: 2015
- Thai FA Cup: 2015
- Thai League Cup: 2015
- Kor Royal Cup: 2015
- Mekong Club Championship: 2015
