= Wutthipan Pantalee =

Thai footballer (born 1985)

Personal information
- Full name: Wutthipan Pantalee
- Date of birth: 30 April 1985 (age 41)
- Place of birth: Kalasin, Thailand
- Height: 1.72 m (5 ft 7 1/2 in)
- Position: Attacking midfielder

Senior career*
Years	Team	Apps	(Gls)
2007–2008	Sriracha	32	(5)
2009–2012	Bangkok United	9	(3)
2013–2015	Chiangmai	32	(5)
2016–2017	Prachuap	17	(2)
2017	Trat		
- * Club domestic league appearances and goals as of 14 November 2008

Wutthipan Pantalee (Thai: วุฒิพันธ์ พันธะลี, born April 30, 1985) is a Thai professional footballer who currently plays for Trat in the Thai League 2.
