= Sarawut Jomkamsing =

Thai footballer (born 1984)

Personal information
- Full name: Sarawut Jomkamsing
- Date of birth: July 16, 1984 (age 42)
- Place of birth: Roi Et, Thailand
- Height: 1.71 m (5 ft 7 1/2 in)
- Position: Defender

Team information
- Current team: Rajnavy Rayong
- Number: 4

Senior career*
Years	Team	Apps	(Gls)
2009–present	Rajnavy Rayong		
- * Club domestic league appearances and goals as of 14 November 2008

Sarawut Jomkamsing is a Thai professional footballer. He currently plays for Rajnavy Rayong in the Thailand Premier League.
