= Danusorn Puisangjan =

Thai footballer (born 1984)

Personal information
- Full name: Danusorn Puisangjan
- Date of birth: July 31, 1984 (age 42)
- Place of birth: Chaiyaphum, Thailand
- Height: 1.69 m (5 ft 6 1/2 in)
- Position: Midfielder

Team information
- Current team: PTT Rayong F.C.

Senior career*
Years	Team	Apps	(Gls)
2009–2010	Rajnavy Rayong		
2011	PTT Rayong		
- * Club domestic league appearances and goals as of 14 November 2008

Danusorn Puisangjan is a professional footballer from Thailand who plays for PTT Rayong in the Thai Division 1 League.
