= Wisoot Bunpeng =

Thai footballer (born 1988)

Personal information
- Full name: Wisoot Bunpeng
- Date of birth: 10 January 1988 (age 38)
- Place of birth: Chiang Rai, Thailand
- Height: 1.75 m (5 ft 9 in)
- Position: Midfielder

Youth career
- 2005–2007: Assumption College Thonburi

Senior career*
Years	Team	Apps	(Gls)
2008	Raj Pracha		
2009	Thai Port		
2009	Viva Kerala		
2010	Muangkan United		
2010	Bangkok		
2011	Phichit		
2012	Phitsanulok		
2012	Phichit		
2013	Nakhon Sawan		
2014	Lampang		
2015	Nakhon Sawan		
2015	Ubon UMT United		
2016	Raj Pracha		

International career
2006–2007	Thailand U19		
- * Club domestic league appearances and goals

Wisoot Bunpeng (Thai: วิสูตร บุญเป็ง; born 10 January 1988), simply known as Da (Thai: ดา), is a Thai retired professional footballer. He was the runner-up of Pepsi World Challenge 2006 with Anawin Jujeen. He had a short spell at Indian I-League club Viva Kerala in 2009. After first phase of the league, he was released due to injury.

Bunpeng played international football for Thailand at under-18 and under-19 levels.

== Honours ==
Ubon UMT United

- Regional League Division 2: 2015
- Regional League North-East Division: Runner-up 2015
