= Chinnakorn Deesai =

Thai footballer

Personal information
- Full name: Chinnakorn Deesai
- Date of birth: 22 September 1983 (age 43)
- Place of birth: Ubon Ratchatani, Thailand
- Height: 1.76 m (5 ft 9 1/2 in)
- Position: Goalkeeper

Senior career*
Years	Team	Apps	(Gls)
2009–2014	Rajnavy Rayong	67	(0)
2015	Ubon UMT United	6	(0)
2016	Prachuap Khiri Khan	19	(0)
2017–2018	Navy	0	(0)
- * Club domestic league appearances and goals as of 14 November 2008

Chinnakorn Deesai is a retired professional footballer from Thailand.

== Honor ==
Ubon UMT United

- Regional League Division 2:
  - Winners : 2015
- Regional League North-East Division
  - Runner-up : 2015
