= Kritchana Yod-Ard =

Thai footballer

Personal information
- Full name: Kritchana Yod-Ard
- Date of birth: 7 June 1988 (age 38)
- Place of birth: Samut Prakan, Thailand
- Height: 1.76 m (5 ft 9 1/2 in)
- Position: Goalkeeper

Senior career*
Years	Team	Apps	(Gls)
2009–2015	Police United	18	(0)
2014	→ Ayutthaya (loan)	16	(0)
2016	Nakhon Pathom United	21	(0)
2017–2018	Chainat Hornbill	1	(0)
2019–2020	MOF Customs United	0	(0)
- * Club domestic league appearances and goals as of 8 October 2011

Kritchana Yod-Ard (Thai: กฤษชนะ ยอดอาจ, born 7 June 1988) is a Thai professional footballer.

== Honours ==
=== Club ===
Police United

- Thai Division 1 League Champions (1) : 2009
