= Alef Poh-ji =

Thai footballer (born 1987)

Personal information
- Full name: Alef Poh-ji
- Date of birth: 13 April 1987 (age 39)
- Place of birth: Narathiwat, Thailand
- Height: 1.78 m (5 ft 10 in)
- Position: Midfielder

Senior career*
Years	Team	Apps	(Gls)
2003–2009	Nara United	68	(5)
2009–2010	Thai Port	42	(2)
2011	Buriram	19	(2)
2012–2013	Bangkok United	5	(0)
2013–2015	Phuket	19	(2)
2016	Navy	24	(0)
2017	Ubon UMT United	0	(0)
2017	Nara United	11	(1)
2018	Phrae United	15	(0)
2018	Nara United	10	(0)
2019	Pattani	12	(0)
Total		225	(12)
- * Club domestic league appearances and goals as of 04:17, 20 February 2022 (UTC)

Alef Poh-ji (Thai: อาลีฟ เปาะจิ, born 13 April 1987), or simply known as Lef (Thai: ลีฟ) is a Thai retired professional footballer who plays as a midfielder.

== Honours ==
=== Club ===
Thai Port

- Thai FA Cup: 2009
- Thai League Cup: 2010

Buriram

- Thai Division 1 League: 2011
