= Zaw Htet Aung =

Burmese footballer

Personal information
- Date of birth: 5 November 1987 (age 38)
- Place of birth: Mandalay, Burma
- Height: 1.70 m (5 ft 7 in)
- Position: Defender

Youth career
- 2004–2007: Kanbawza FC

Senior career*
Years	Team	Apps	(Gls)
2007–2010	Ministry of Energy		
2010–	Yangon United FC	120	(5)

International career^{‡}
2006–	Myanmar	28	(1)
Medal record
Men's football
Representing Myanmar
Southeast Asian Games
Silver medal – second place	2007 Kuala Lumpur	Team
- * Club domestic league appearances and goals ‡ National team caps and goals as of 8 October 2016

Zaw Htet Aung (Burmese: ဇော်ထက်အောင်; born 27 December 1988) is a Burmese footballer.

== International ==
In 2007, he represented the Myanmar U-23s team in the final of 2007 SEA Games, losing to Thailand.
