= Ahmad Aminuddin Shaharudin =

Malaysian footballer

Personal information
- Full name: Ahmad Aminuddin bin Shaharudin
- Date of birth: 21 March 1990 (age 36)
- Place of birth: Selangor, Malaysia
- Height: 1.78 m (5 ft 10 in)
- Position: Striker

Team information
- Current team: DRB-Hicom F.C.

Youth career
- 2006: Selangor FA President Cup

Senior career*
Years	Team	Apps	(Gls)
2007–2010	Harimau Muda A		
2010	Perlis		
2011	Negeri Sembilan	10	(0)
2012	Felda United FC		
2013	Sarawak		
2014	Malacca United	7	(0)
2015	DRB-Hicom F.C.		

International career^{‡}
2006–2007	Malaysia U-19		
2008–2010	Malaysia U-21	12	(1)
- * Club domestic league appearances and goals as of 13 December 2013 ‡ National team caps and goals as of 13 December 2013

Ahmad Aminuddin Shaharudin (born 21 March 1990 in Selangor) is a Malaysian footballer currently playing for DRB-Hicom F.C. in the 2014 Malaysia FAM League.

He had played for Harimau Muda (with whom he won the 2009 Malaysia Premier League title), Perlis, Negeri Sembilan, Felda United and Sarawak. Aminuddin was included in the Malaysia u19 team and the Malaysia u21 team.
