= Pollawut Kwasena =

Thai footballer (born 1988)

Personal information
- Full name: Pollawut Kwasena
- Date of birth: 3 July 1988 (age 38)
- Place of birth: Kanchanaburi, Thailand
- Height: 1.80 m (5 ft 11 in)
- Position: Left winger

Senior career*
| Years | Team | Apps | (Gls) |
| 2008–2009 | PEA | 19 | (3) |
| 2009–2016 | Bangkok United | 16 | (0) |
| 2015–2016 | → Bangkok (loan) | 6 | (0) |
| 2017 | Udon Thani | 16 | (0) |
| 2017–2020 | Air Force United | 19 | (0) |
| 2020–2021 | Muangkan United | | |

International career
| 2011 | Thailand U23 | | |
- * Club domestic league appearances and goals as of 11 October 2008

Pollawut Kwasenai (Thai: พลวุฒิ ขวาเสนา, born March 7, 1988), formerly Pollawut Donjui (Thai: พลวุฒิ ดอนจุ้ย) is a Thai professional footballer who plays as a left winger. He won the Thailand Premier League in 2008.

== Honours ==
=== Club ===
PEA

- Thai Premier League (1): 2008
