= Whoo Hyun =

South Korean footballer

Personal information
- Date of birth: January 5, 1987 (age 39)
- Place of birth: Seoul, South Korea
- Height: 1.87 m (6 ft 1 1/2 in)
- Position: Defender

Youth career
- Taesung High School
- Jeonju University

Senior career*
Years	Team	Apps	(Gls)
2008	Seoul Pabal FC		
2009	Bucheon FC 1995	20	(4)
2010–2012	Police United	133	(14)
2012–2013	Port	30	(4)
2014	Air Force Central	27	(2)
2016	Daejeon Citizen	4	(0)
2017	Songkhla United	30	(2)
2018	Preah Khan Reach Svay Rieng	30	(4)
2019–	JL Chiangmai United	22	(1)
- * Club domestic league appearances and goals as of 12 February 2017

- Whoo Hyun
- Hangul: 우현
- Hanja: 禹賢
- RR: U Hyeon
- MR: U Hyŏn

Whoo Hyun (Korean: 우현; Hanja: 禹賢; born January 5, 1987) is a South Korean football player, last signed to Chiangmai United F.C.
