= Philippines national under-21 football team =

Philippines U-21
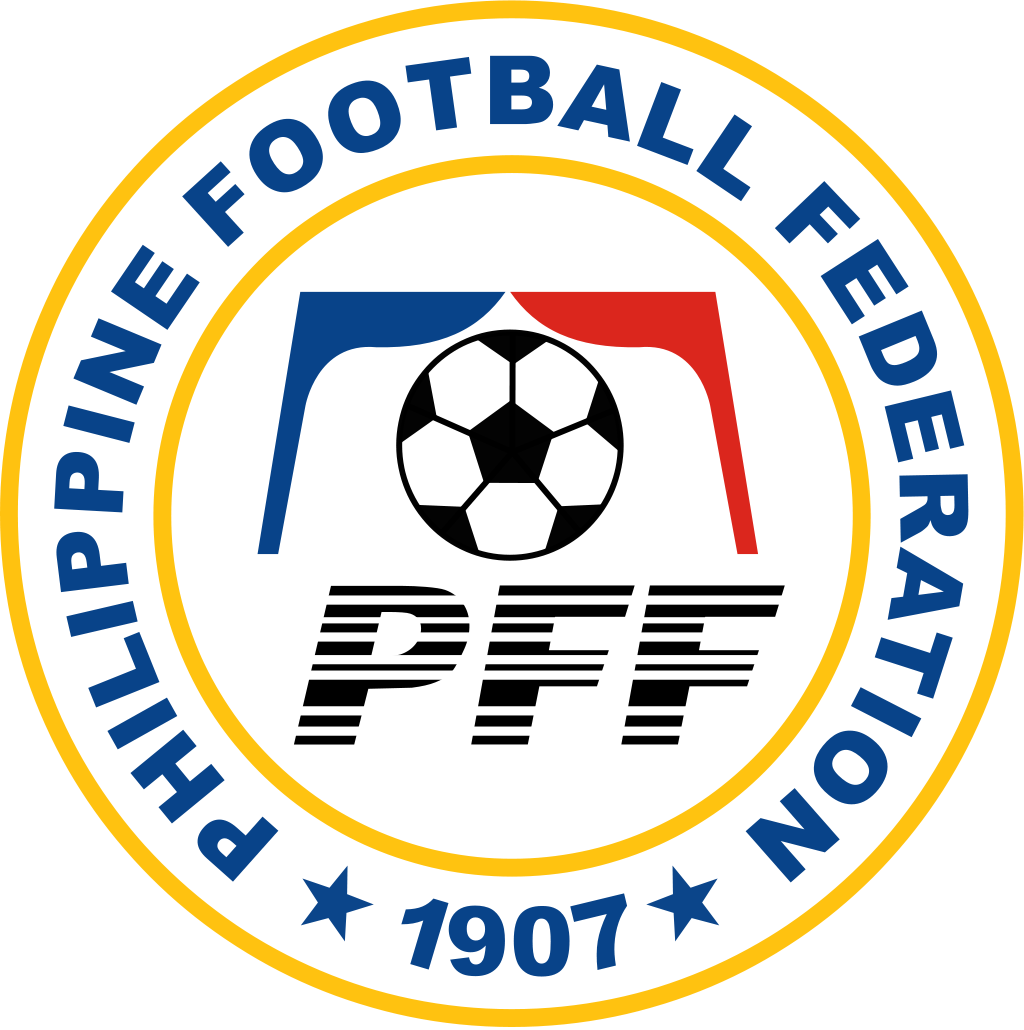
- Association: Philippine Football Federation
- Confederation: AFC (Asia)
- Sub-confederation: AFF (Southeast Asia)
- Home stadium: PFF National Training Center
- FIFA code: PHI

Biggest defeat
- Indonesia 10–0 Philippines (Bandar Seri Begawan, Brunei; 16 August 2002)

The Philippines national under-21 football team represents the Philippines in international youth football competitions.

== Coaches ==
- (Serbia) Zoran Đorđević (2012)
- (Australia) Jim Fraser (2014-)

== Tournament records ==
=== Hassanal Bolkiah Trophy ===
The Philippines' Hassanal Bolkiah Trophy Record
Year	Round	Position	GP	W	D	L	GS	GA
(Brunei) 2002	Group stage	5th in group	4	0	0	4	1	21
(Brunei) 2005	Group stage	5th in group	4	0	1	3	1	8
(Brunei) 2007	Group stage	4th in group	3	1	1	1	3	18
(Brunei) 2012	Group stage	5th in group	4	0	0	4	4	16
(Brunei) 2014	Group stage	3rd in group	4	1	1	2	6	8
(Brunei) 2018	Did not participate							
Total	–	–	19	2	3	14	15	71

== See also ==
- Azkals Development Academy
- Football in the Philippines
- Philippines national football team
- Philippines national under-23 football team
- Philippines national under-19 football team
- Philippines national under-17 football team
- Philippines women's national football team
- Philippines women's national under-20 football team
