= Assumption College Thonburi =

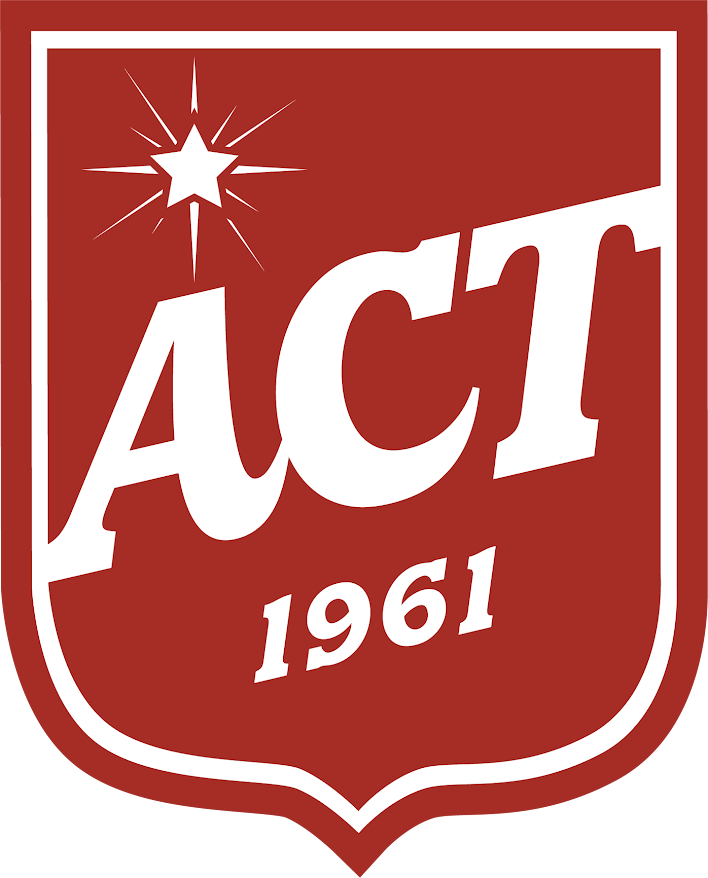
- 92 Assumption Rd. Bang Khae, Bangkok; Thailand

Information
- Type: Private Roman Catholic Non-profit coeducational Basic (Primary and Secondary) education institution
- Motto: Labor Omnia Vincit (Latin); Labor Conquers All Things
- Religious affiliations: Roman Catholic (Gabrielite Brothers)
- Established: 1961; 65 years ago
- Founder: Bro. John Mary Jesus Salas Esquiroz, f.s.g.
- Director: Bro. Weerayut Boonpram, f.s.g.
- Language: Thai, English, Mandarin Chinese, Japanese
- Colors: Red and white
- Website: www.act.ac.th

Assumption College Thonburi (Thai: โรงเรียนอัสสัมชัญธนบุรี) is a private Catholic school located in Bangkok, Thailand. It is the eighth private school founded by the St. Gabriel Foundation in Thailand. The school was founded by Bro. John Mary Jesus Salas Esquiroz of the Saint Gabriel foundation in 1961.

The school provides education to students from grade 1 through 12 (K-1 to K-12).

== History ==
Assumption College Thonburi was established in 1961 by the Brothers of St. Gabriel to address the growing student population in Bangkok, which the existing school could no longer accommodate. Brother Angel Infante (อาซีเนียว อานเกล อินฟานเต) served as the first chancellor, with Brother Martin Prateep Komonmart (ประทีป โคมลมาศ) acting as the first headmaster. Upon opening, the school offered education for grades 1 through 9.

In 1963, the school introduced a music program, which saw many of its graduates continuing their studies at institutions such as Trinity College of Music and Chulalongkorn University. The school's band gained recognition in 1966 when it won a singing competition and received a certificate from Princess Maha Chakri Sirindhorn (ศาสตราจารย์กิตติมศักดิ์ ดอกเตอร์ พลเอกหญิง พลเรือเอกหญิง พลอากาศเอกหญิง สมเด็จพระเทพรัตนราชสุดา เจ้าฟ้ามหาจักรีสิรินธร รัฐสีมาคุณากรปิยชาติ สยามบรมราชกุมารี).

The school has its first sports competition with St. Gabriel's School on July 12, 1971.

Between 1972 and 1995, the campus underwent significant modification and infrastructure development. In 1994, Assumption College Thonburi partnered with the United Kingdom's Bell Education Trust to improve its educational offerings.

In 2002, the National Library of Thailand recognized the school's library for its excellence, with the collection currently holding approximately 3,000 books. In the same year, the school's football team was appointed as the Asian representative for the "Manchester United Premier Cup 2003 World Final" in Oregon, United States, where they finished 5th out of 20 teams. The school also participated in environmental projects in conjunction with the Knoten Weimar Institute of Germany.

The school opened its English Program in 2004, later expanding this program in 2012 with an agreement with the University of Oregon to have presumptive teachers trained annually there.

In 2009, the school changed its policies, allowing girls to be admitted to the school for the first time.

Since 2012, the school director has been Brother Dr. Weerayut Bunpram, f.s.g. (ภาดา ดร. วีระยุทธ บุญพราหมณ์).

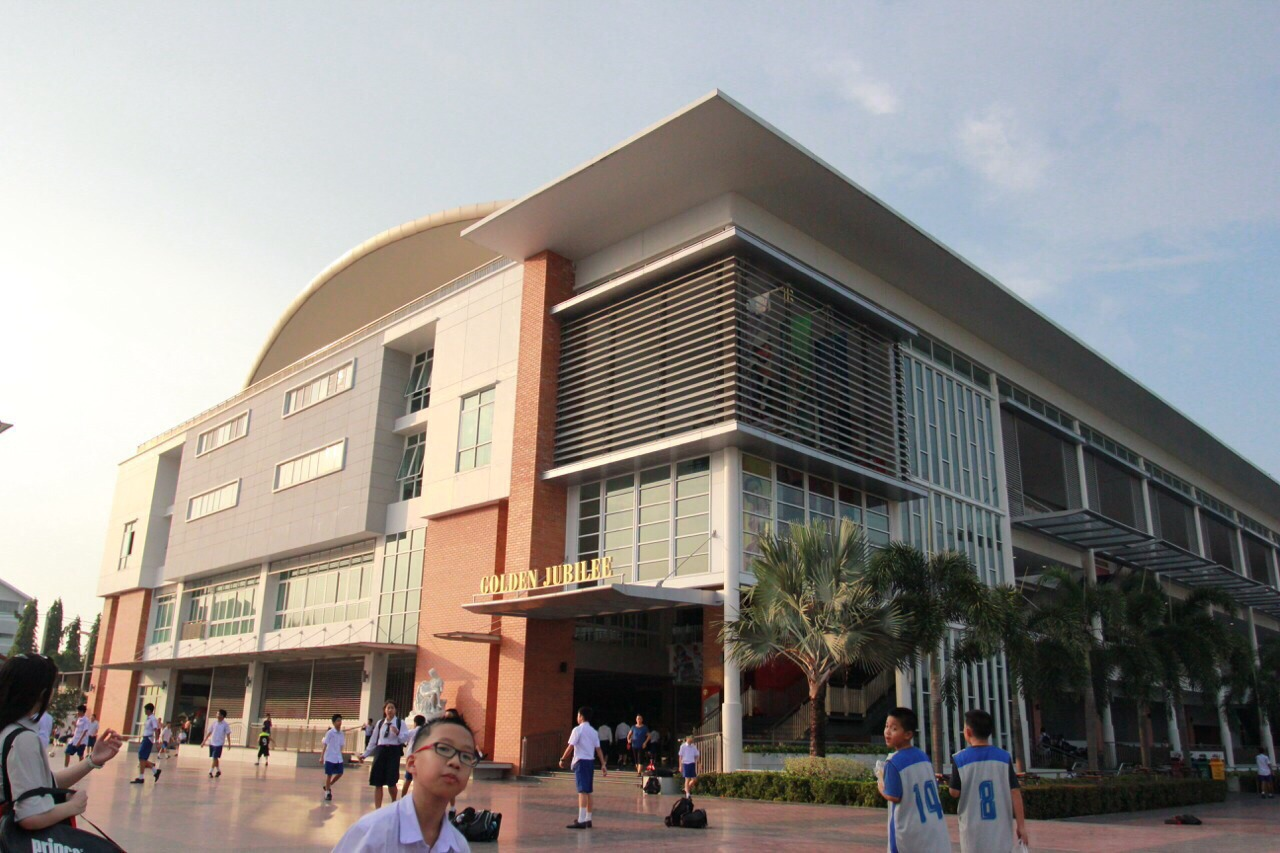
The Fitness Center, Cafeteria and Gymnasium (Golden Jubilee)

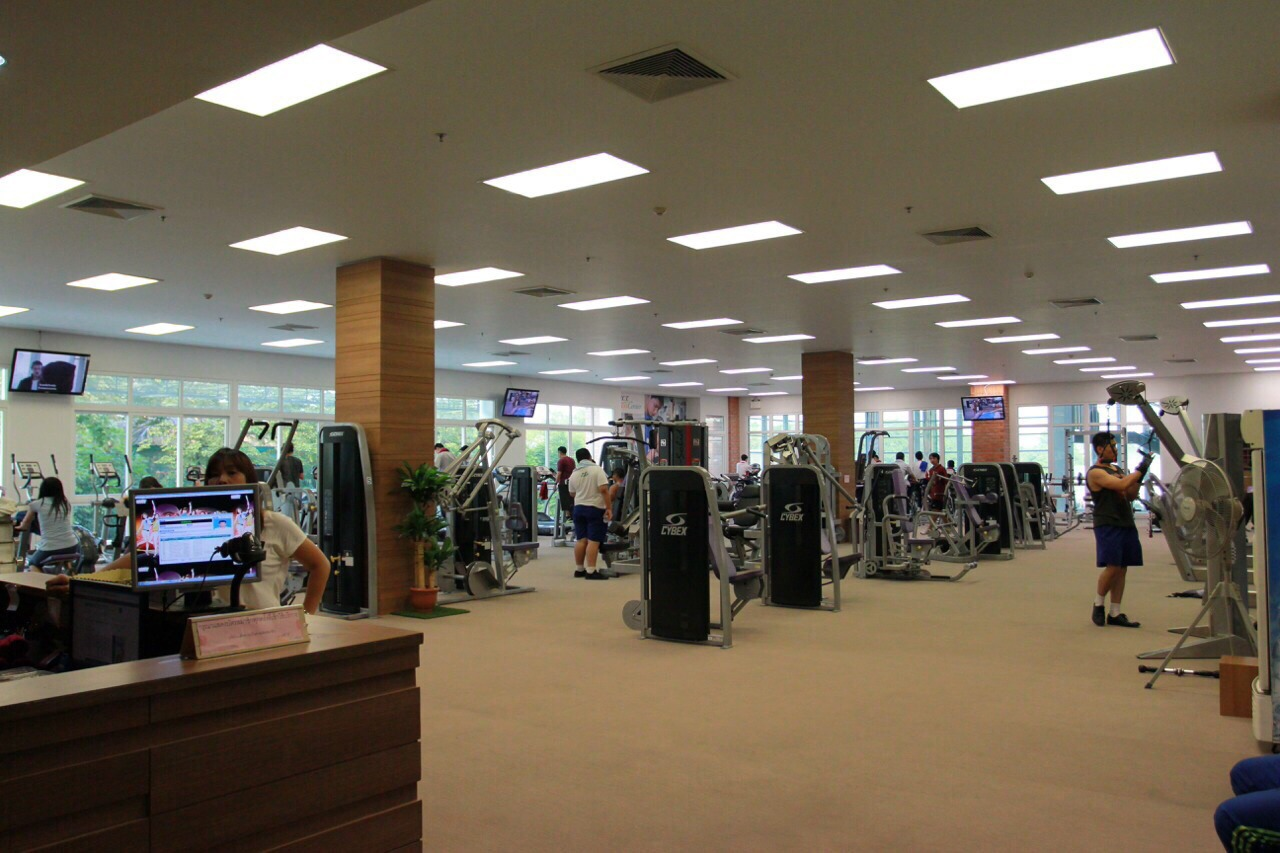
The interior of the Fitness Center and Gymnasium building. (Golden Jubilee)

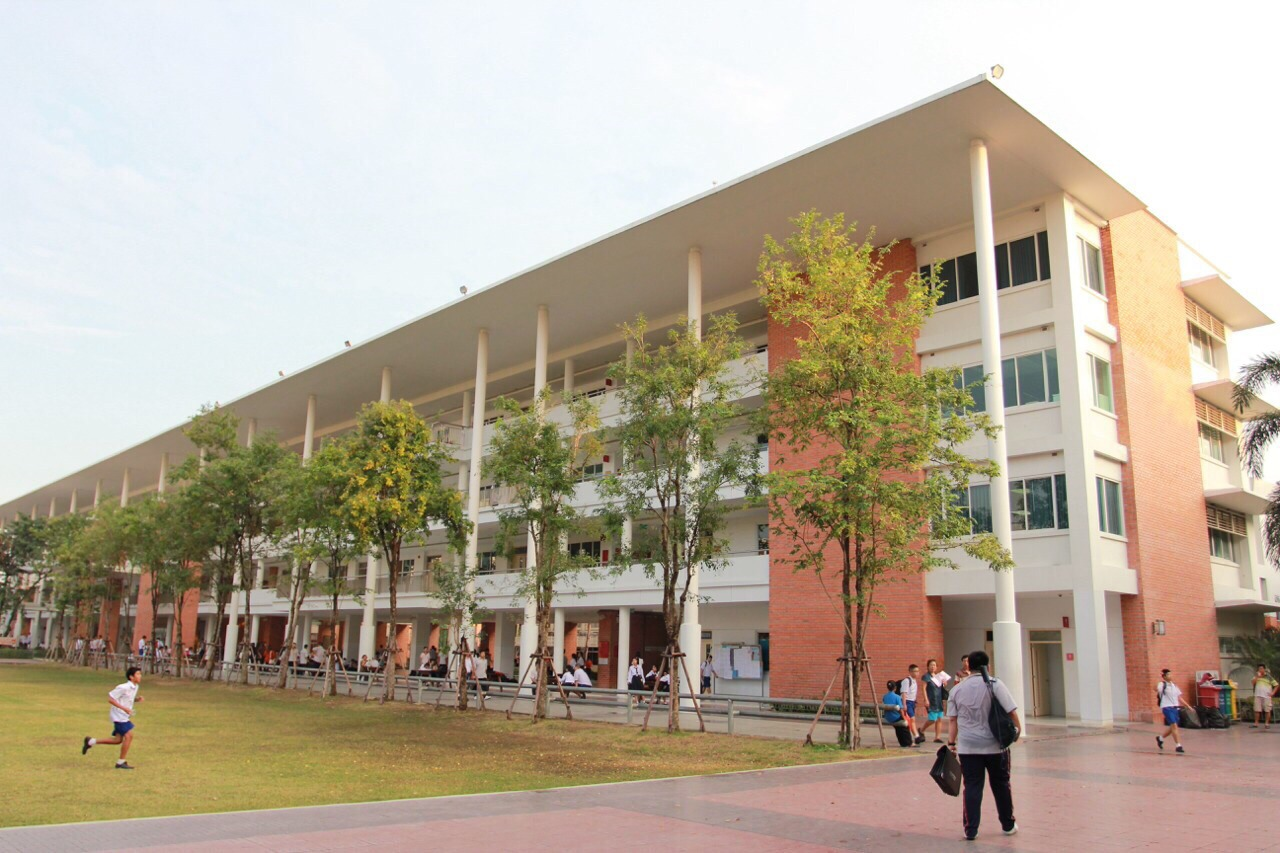
The St. Peter building

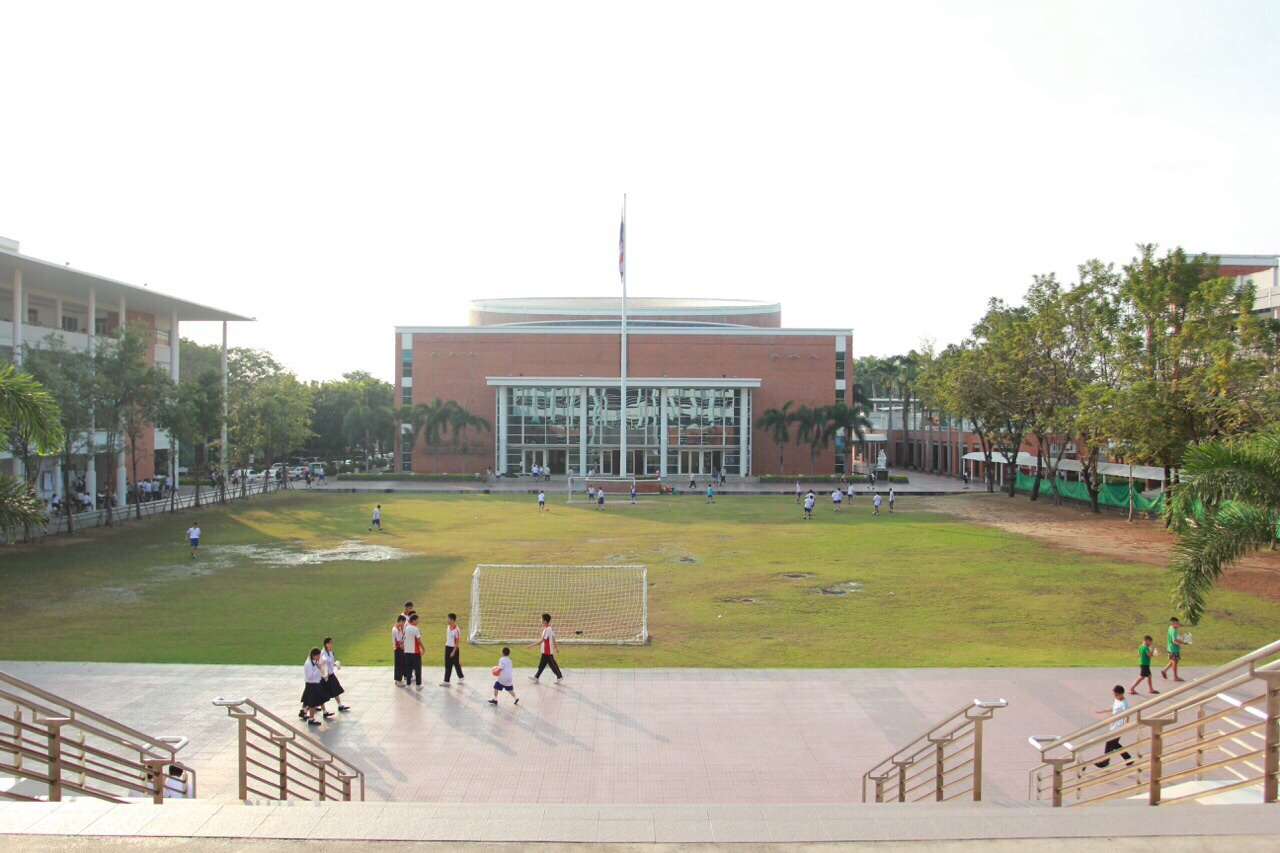
The Louis Mary de Monfort building.

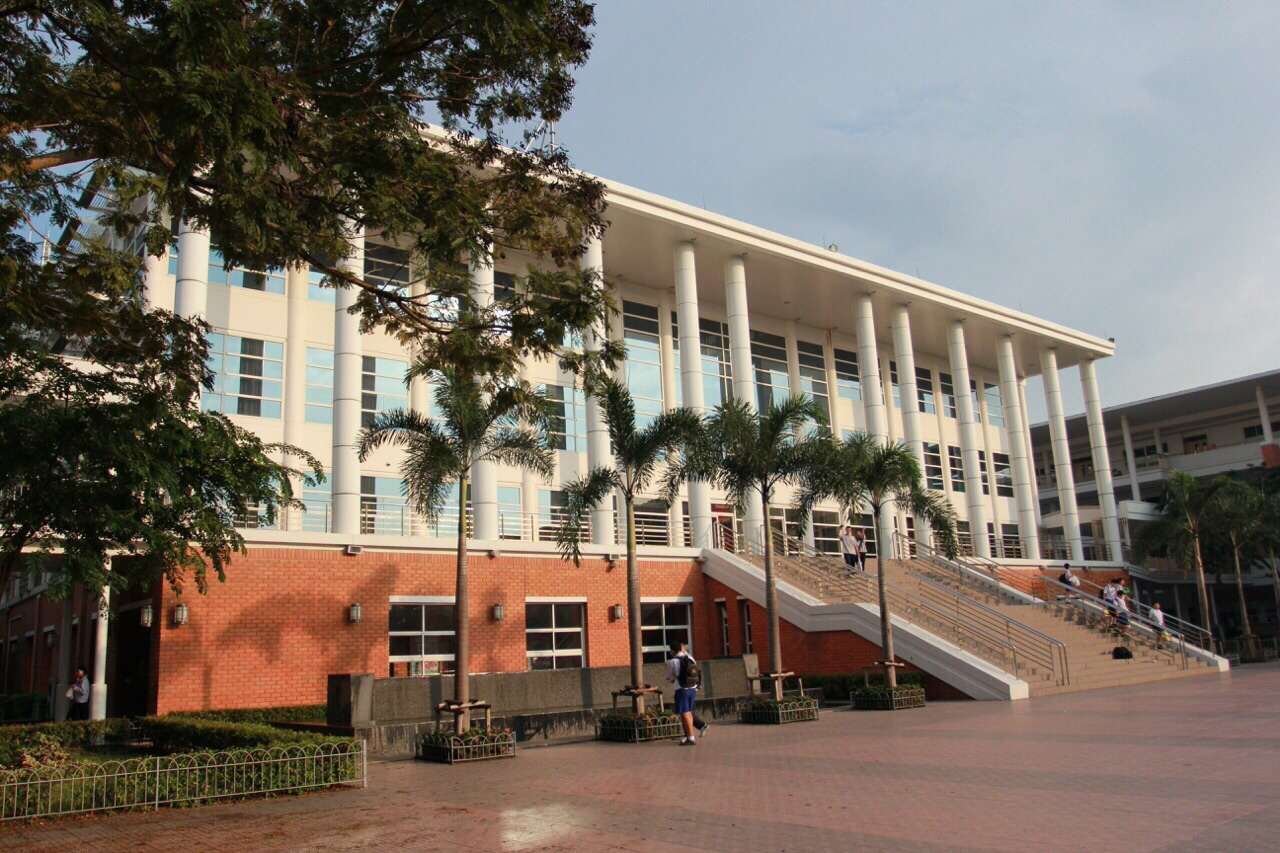
The Ratanabunnakarn building

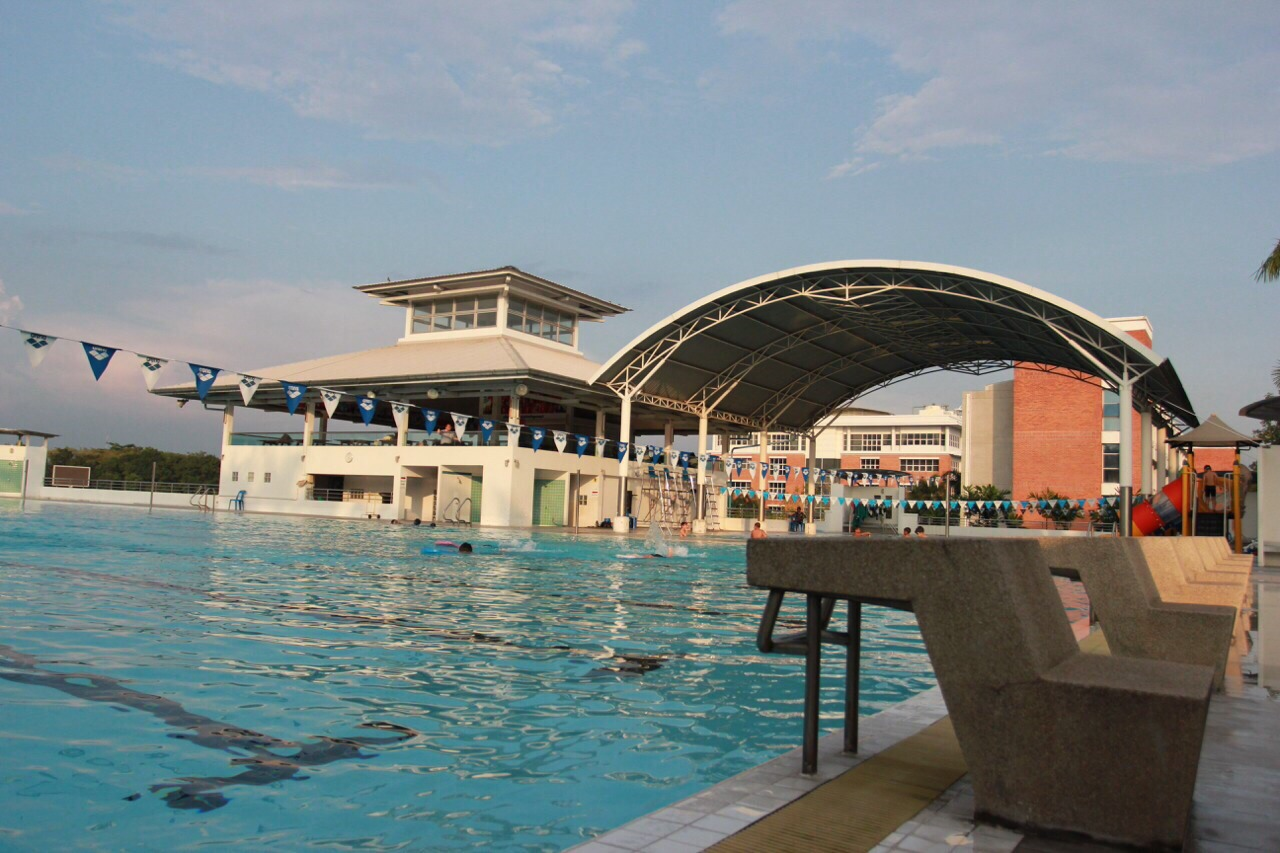
Inside the Terd-Tepparat 36 building

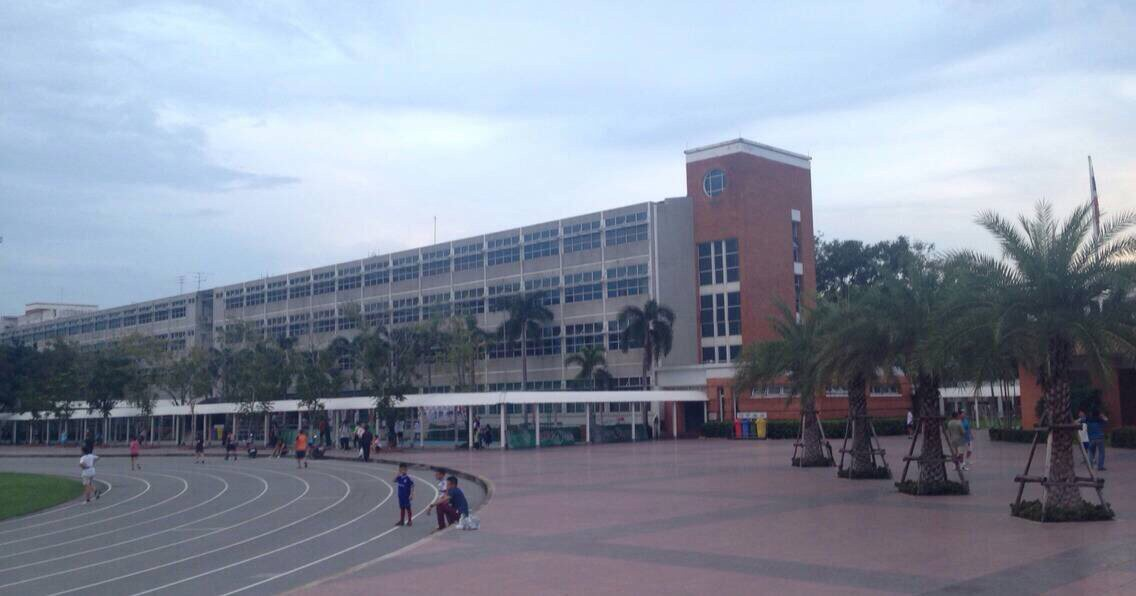
The Assumption building

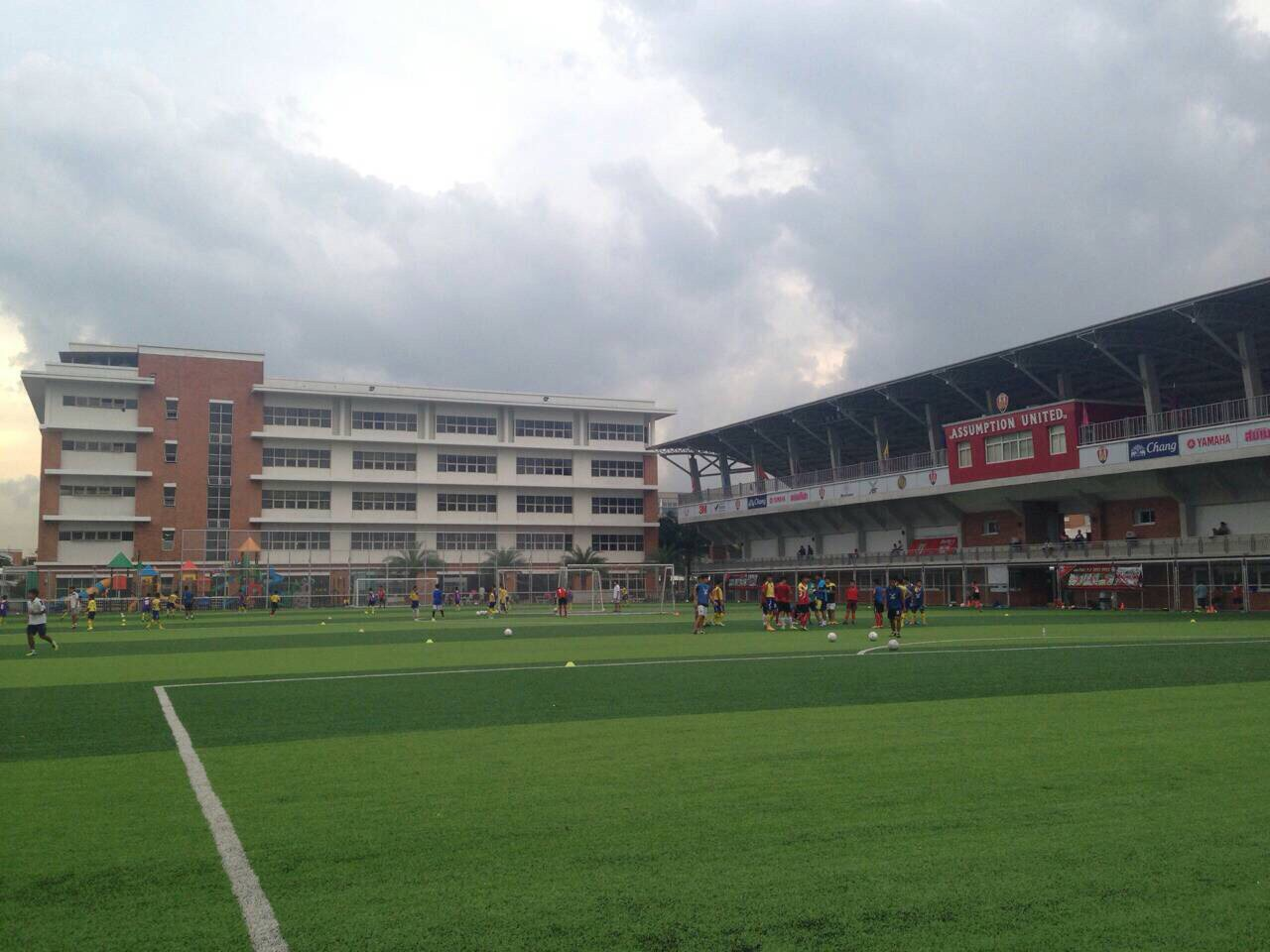
The football field at the east of the Raphael building

== Logo ==
The logo is in the shape of a red shield with the acronym "ACT", for Assumption College Thonburi. The year "1961" underneath "ACT" signifies the year of the foundation of the school. The logo also features a star in the top left corner.

== Founder ==
The college was founded by Bro. John Mary Jesus Salas Esquiroz. Born on the 26th of December, 1914, in Tafalia Naverra, Spain, he came to Thailand on 6 February 1936. He became the director of St. Louis School in 1953 and later the director of St. Gabriel School in 1960.

Esquiroz has built and set up multiple schools, such as Assumption College Thonburi (which he became the chancellor of in 1955), Assumption Lumpang, and Assumption Rayong. He was also involved in the building of the students' and teachers' dispensary at Assumption College Sriracha.

Historical List of Directors
No.	Name - Surname	Positions	Term (Buddhist Era)
1	Reverend Brother Arsenio Ángel Infante (Passed Away)	Director	2504
2	Reverend Brother Ildefonso Mary Cecilia (Passed Away)	Director	2505 2506 2507
3	Reverend Brother Philip Amnuay Pinratana (Passed Away)	Director	2508
4	Reverend Brother Andrew Arom Worasilp (Passed Away)	Director	2508 2509 2510
5	Reverend Brother Dr. Vishith Srivichairat	Director	2511 2512 2513 2514 2515 2516
6	Reverend Brother Dr. Bancha Saenghiran	Director	2517 2518 2519 2520
7	Reverend Brother Sompong Srisura	Director	2521 2522 2523 2524 2526
8	Reverend Brother Misak Wongprachanukul	Director	2527 2528 2529 2530 2531 2532 2533 2534
9	Reverend Brother Dr. Anant Prichavudhi	Director	2535 2536 2537 2538 2539 2540
10	Reverend Brother Dr. Lerdchai Lavasut	Director	2541 2542 2543
11	Reverend Brother Dr. Dechachai Sripicharn	Director	2544 2545 2546
12	Reverend Brother Ajin Tengtrakul	Director	2547 2548 2549
13	Reverend Brother Dr. Chamnan Laoruckphon (1st Term)	Director	2550 2551 2552 2553 2554 2555
14	Reverend Brother Dr. Weerayut Bunpram (1st Term)	Director	2556 2557 2558 2559 2560 2561
15	Reverend Brother Dr. Chamnan Laoruckphon (2nd Term)	Director	2562 2563 2564
16	Reverend Brother Sakda Sakonthawat (Passed Away)	Director	2565 2566 2567
17	Reverend Brother Dr. Weerayut Bunpram (2nd Term)	Director	2568 Present

== Main buildings ==
Assumption College Thonburi has 17 buildings, six of which are used for academic purposes.

- Ratanabunnakarn Building is a learning building and was named by Princess Maha Chakri Sirindhorn (ศาสตราจารย์กิตติมศักดิ์ ดอกเตอร์ พลเอกหญิง พลเรือเอกหญิง พลอากาศเอกหญิง สมเด็จพระเทพรัตนราชสุดา เจ้าฟ้ามหาจักรีสิรินธร รัฐสีมาคุณากรปิยชาติ สยามบรมราชกุมารี). It houses rooms such as the Tawee Punya Library Ratanabunnakarn, the director's residence, audiovisual aids rooms, A learning space for students, amongst others.
- The Louis Mary Building was constructed in honour of St. Louis-Marie Grignion de Monfort, the founder of the Monfort Brothers of St. Gabriel. It is a multi-purpose building whose upper floors are used for exhibitions, conferences or the playing of indoor sports. The ground floor is home to the ACT Music Center.
- The Assumption Building was built to mark the ACT's 30th anniversary celebrations and is home to grades 5 to 8.
- The Raphael Building was built to honour Brother Pakde Tummakanon and houses grades 1 to 4.
- The TerdTepparat 36 building was built to mark the occasion of the 36th birthday of Princess Maha Chakri Sirindhorn in 1991. It contains an Olympic-sized pool and a 25-metre training pool. ACT's sports facilities are also kept here. The school's First aid room and canteen are also located here.
- The St. Gabriel Building was originally called the Science Building but its function was changed as the school's student numbers increased. The school has since constructed a dedicated science building.
- The John Mary Building was built to mark the contribution to school of Bro. John Mary who was the founder of Assumption College Thonburi.
- The St. Marie Building was originally named the Saint Louis building but the name was changed during the time of Brother Lerchai Lavasud.
- The St. Martin Building is home to dormitories and it accommodates the sport students during camps.
- St. Andrew's Building is the residence of foreign teachers and was named to honour Brother Andrew Arrom, a former chancellor of Assumption College Thonburi.
- The Golden Jubilee houses the ACT Fitness Centre and gymnasium. It is used for dancing room, tennis, golf, taekwondo, and yoga. The ground floor has a large canteen for ACT students and teachers. Its third floor is a conference centre.
- The Ildefonso Building is a learning building for English Program (EP) Students ranging from grade 6 to 12 and is also home to the EP Bell Office which is used for foreign teachers who teach at English Program (EP).

== Famous alumni ==
=== Football Athletes ===
- Theerathon Bunmathan – Football player
- Teerasil Dangda – Football player
- Kawin Thamsatchanan – Football player
- Sarach Yooyen - Football player
- Narubadin Weerawatnodom - Football player
- Kirati Keawsombat - Football player
- Prakit Deeprom - Football player
- Verot Pombuppha - Football player
- Wisoot Bunpeng - Football player
- Sorawit Panthong - Football player
- Suphan Thongsong - Football player

=== Badminton Athletes ===
- Ratchanok Inthanon - Badminton player
- Kunlavut Vitidsarn - Badminton player
- Pisit Poodchalat - Badminton player
- Sudket Prapakamol - Badminton player
- Patapol Ngernsrisuk - Badminton player

=== Entertainment Industry ===
- Sarunchana Apisamaimongkol (Aye) - singer, actress
- Yardthip Rajpal - actress, model
