= Valéry Sanou =

Burkinabe footballer

Valérie Sanou
Personal information
- Full name: Valérie Sanou
- Date of birth: December 19, 1989 (age 36)
- Place of birth: Ouagadougou, Burkina Faso
- Height: 1.70 m (5 ft 7 in)
- Position: Midfielder

Team information
- Current team: State Envoys FC
- Number: 10

Youth career
- 2003–2004: EFO

Senior career*
Years	Team	Apps	(Gls)
2005–2009	EFO	56	(12)
2009	Muangthong United F.C.	10	(4)
2009	Yadanabon FC	4	(0)
2009–2011	Sriracha F.C.	3	(0)
2011–	State Envoys FC		
- * Club domestic league appearances and goals

Valéry Sanou (born 19 December 1989) is a Burkinabé footballer who plays for State Envoys FC.

== Career ==
Sanou began his career with Etoile Filante Ouagadougou who won in his first professional season 2007/2008 the Burkinabé SuperCup and Coupe du Faso. He signed than in March 2009 for Muangthong United F.C. in the Thai Premier League who played between June 2009 now played one month for Yadanabon FC in the Myanmar National League, before in July 2009 signed for Sriracha FC. In summer 2011 returned to Africa and signed with Ghanaian Poly Tank Division One League Kumasi based State Envoys FC.

== Honours ==
- 2005: Burkinabé SuperCup
- 2006: Coupe du Faso
- 2008: Burkinabé Premier League
- 2008: Coupe du Faso
