= Sittipong Manaowarn =

Thai footballer

Personal information
- Full name: Sittipong Manaowarn
- Date of birth: 18 February 1982 (age 44)
- Place of birth: Chaiyaphum, Thailand
- Height: 1.81 m (5 ft 11 1/2 in)
- Position: Goalkeeper

Senior career*
| Years | Team | Apps | (Gls) |
| 2009–2013 | Royal Thai Navy | 96 | (0) |
| 2014 | → PTT Rayong (loan) | 31 | (0) |
| 2015 | Khon Kaen United | 3 | (0) |
- * Club domestic league appearances and goals as of 14 November 2008

Sittipong Manaowarn (Thai: สิทธิพงษ์ มะนาวหวาน) is a retired professional footballer from Thailand.
