= Maroot Dokmalipar =

Thai footballer (born 1983)

Personal information
- Full name: Maroot Dokmalipar
- Date of birth: April 16, 1983 (age 43)
- Place of birth: Kanchanaburi, Thailand
- Height: 1.72 m (5 ft 7 1/2 in)
- Position: Midfielder

Team information
- Current team: Rajnavy Rayong
- Number: 16

Senior career*
Years	Team	Apps	(Gls)
2009–present	Rajnavy Rayong		
- * Club domestic league appearances and goals as of 14 November 2008

Maroot Dokmalipar is a Thai professional footballer who currently plays for Rajnavy Rayong in the Thailand Premier League.
