= Choklap Nilsang =

Thai professional footballer

Personal information
- Full name: Choklap Nilsang
- Date of birth: 12 May 1987 (age 39)
- Place of birth: Thailand
- Height: 1.77 m (5 ft 9 1/2 in)
- Position: Forward

Senior career*
| Years | Team | Apps | (Gls) |
| 2007 | Muangthong United | 16 | (4) |
| 2008–2010 | Suvarnabhumi Customs | 39 | (12) |
| 2011 | Samutsongkhram | 22 | (6) |
| 2013–2016 | Chiangrai United | 85 | (7) |
| 2016 | → Chiangmai (loan) | | |
| 2017 | Super Power Samut Prakan | 22 | (1) |
| 2018–2020 | Lampang | | |
- * Club domestic league appearances and goals

Choklap Nilsang (Thai: โชคลาภ นิลแสง) is a retired professional footballer from Thailand. He played as a forward.
