= Supachai Tangwongsan =

Thai computer scientist (born 1947)

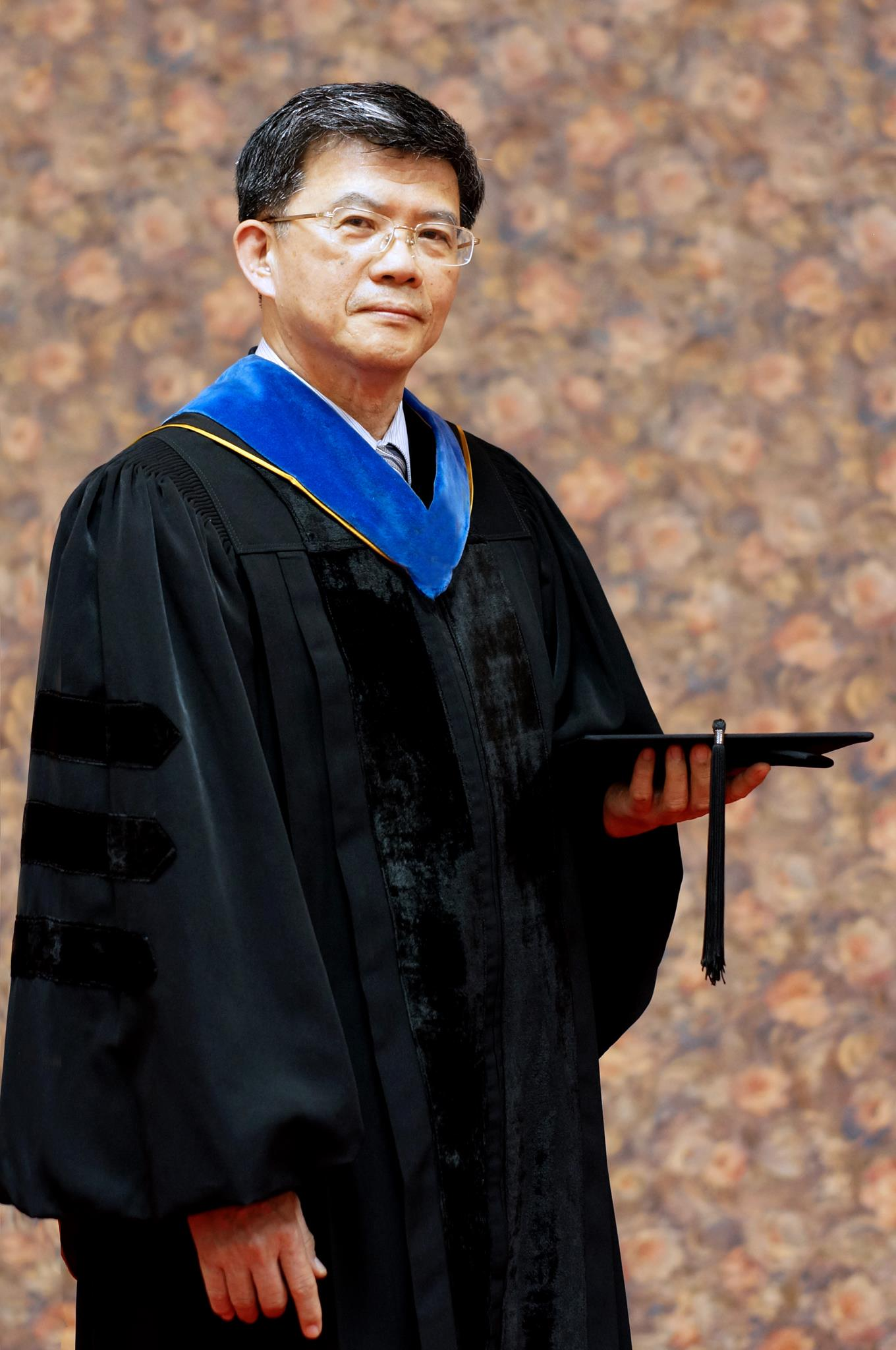
- Supachai in 2015
- Born: 18 December 1947 (age 78)
- Education: Chulalongkorn University; Purdue University
- Known for: BUDSIR
- Awards: Distinguished Service Award (1993) from UC Berkeley
- Scientific career
- Fields: Computer science
- Workplaces: Mahidol University

Supachai Tangwongsan (Thai: ศุภชัย ตั้งวงศ์ศานต์, born 18 December 1947) is a Thai emeritus professor of computer science at Mahidol University, Thailand. He received his Doctor of Philosophy degree in electrical engineering at Purdue University with the Royal support of King Ananda Mahidol Foundation scholarship.

In working experience, Dr. Tangwongsan recently was Chairman of the Executive Board of National Software Industry Promotion Agency of Thailand in 2010–2014. He hold the title of University Vice-President for Academic Infrastructures and Chief Information Officer (CIO) from 1998 to 2007. He was assigned to pioneer an establishment of the Computing Center, Mahidol University and he held the title of Director from 1986 to 1999. For academic affairs, in 1989, he was the founder of Department of Computer Science and served as a Chairman in 1989–1997. In 2003, he also established Faculty of ICT, Mahidol University.

His best known work is Buddhist Scripture Information Retrieval (BUDSIR), the first computerized Buddhist Scripture of the world. BUDSIR had been continuously developed with computerized transliteration in Thai and other eight scripts. BUDSIR was granted an outstanding award for MU innovative work, by the National Research Council of Thailand in 1989, as well as "Distinguished Service Award" by the UC Berkeley in 1993. Another achievement in 2003 earned him "The ICT Innovation Award 2003", a national award for winning first prize for Mahidol University’s Intra-Phone, presented by the National Information Communication Technology Committee.

== Education ==
- Ph.D. in electrical engineering at Purdue University, US in 1976.
- M.S. in electrical engineering at Purdue University, US in 1972.
- B.Eng. in communication electrical engineering (First Class Honors) at Chulalongkorn University, Thailand in 1970.

== Working experience ==
- 1980 - Founder of Computing Center of Mahidol University.
- 1980-1999 - Director of Computing Center, Mahidol University.
- 1989 - Founder of Department of Computer Science, Faculty of Science, Mahidol University.
- 1989-1997 - Chairman, Department of Computer Science, Mahidol University.
- 1990 - Associate professor in computer science at Mahidol University.
- 1998-2007 - Chief information officer (CIO) of Mahidol University.
- 1999-2007 - Vice president for academic infrastructures and facilitation of Mahidol University.
- 2003 - Founder of Faculty of Information and Communications Technology (ICT), Mahidol University.
- 2004 - Acting director of Library Center, Mahidol University.
- 2009–present - Senior advisor of Faculty of ICT, Mahidol University.
- 2010-2014 - Chairman of the executive board of National Software Industry Promotion Agency of Thailand
- 2012 - Professor of computer science at Mahidol University.
- 2013–present - Emeritus professor of computer science at Mahidol University.

== Awards and honors ==
- 1970 - King Bhumipol Scholarship and the gold medal award, Faculty of Engineering, Chulalongkorn University.
- 1971-1977 - Anandamahidol Foundation Scholarship for pursue graduate degrees.
- 1973-1976 - Research grants from National Science Foundation (NSF), US.
- 1989 - Outstanding award of Mahidol University for the pioneer, Project : "Buddhist Scriptures Computerization".
- 1989 - Premier Invention Award from National Research Council of Thailand for the pioneer project : "Buddhist Scriptures Computerization"
- 1993 - Distinguished Service Award from the UC Berkeley, US for the project "Electronic Pali Canon".
- 1997 - Outstanding Contribution to Buddhism Award from Department of Religious Affairs, Ministry of Education.
- 2003 - The ICT Innovation Award 2003 from the National Information Communication Technology Committee for Mahidol University’s Intra-Phone.
- 2010 - Mahidol's Award for the Distinguished Book titled "Information Storage and Retrieval Systems".

== Books ==
- Supachai Tangwongsan, "Information Storage and Retrieval Systems", 3rd Edition, Bangkok Thailand, 2015.
- Supachai Tangwongsan, "Managing ICT Projects", Bangkok Thailand, 2015.
