= Tanapat Na Tarue =

Thai footballer (born 1981)

Personal information
- Full name: Tanapat Na Tarue
- Date of birth: 3 July 1981 (age 45)
- Place of birth: Phang Nga, Thailand
- Height: 1.76 m (5 ft 9 1/2 in)
- Position: Defensive midfielder

Youth career
- 2003: Bangkok Christian College

Senior career*
Years	Team	Apps	(Gls)
2002–2004	Bangkok Christian College	47	(1)
2004–2008	Bangkok United	77	(5)
2009	Muangthong United	3	(0)
2010–2014	Police United	97	(0)
2015–2016	Army United	31	(0)
2016	Pattaya United	20	(0)
2017	Kasetsart	4	(0)
2017	Bangkok Christian College	10	(0)
Total		289	(6)

International career^{‡}
2009	Thailand	1	(0)

Managerial career
- 2023: Bangkok Christian College
- 2025–: Thailand U23 (assistant)
- * Club domestic league appearances and goals as of 02:02, 12 September 2017 (UTC) ‡ National team caps and goals as of 02:02, 12 September 2017 (UTC)

Tanapat Na Tarue (Thai: ธนพัต ณ ท่าเรือ, born 3 July 1981), simply known as Beer (Thai: เบียร์), is a Thai retired professional footballer who played as a defensive midfielder, who is the assistant coach of Thailand U23.

== Honours ==
Bangkok United

- Thai Premier League: 2006

Muangthong United

- Thai Premier League: 2009
