= Seksan Chaothonglang =

Thai footballer (born 1983)

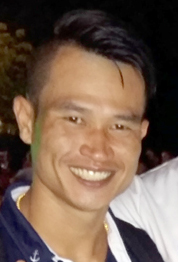
- Seksan Chaothonglang

Personal information
- Full name: Seksan Chaothonglang
- Date of birth: 10 September 1983 (age 43)
- Place of birth: Khon Kaen, Thailand
- Height: 1.77 m (5 ft 9 1/2 in)
- Position: Defender

Senior career*
| Years | Team | Apps | (Gls) |
| 2009–2017 | Navy | 223 | (4) |
| 2015 | → Prachuap (loan) | 19 | (0) |
- * Club domestic league appearances and goals as of 11:09, 21 November 2017 (UTC)

Seksan Chaothonglang (Thai: เสกสันต์ ชาวทองหลาง, born 10 September 1983) is a former professional footballer from Thailand.

== Match fixing scandal and ban ==
On February 21, 2017 Seksan was accused of match-fixing on several league games. He was arrested by royal thai police and banned from football for life.
