= Supachai Kamsab =

Thai footballer (born 1984)

Personal information
- Full name: Supachai Kamsab
- Date of birth: January 6, 1984 (age 42)
- Place of birth: Phitsanulok, Thailand
- Height: 1.70 m (5 ft 7 in)
- Position: Midfielder

Team information
- Current team: Royal Thai Fleet

Senior career*
Years	Team	Apps	(Gls)
2009–2010	Rajnavy Rayong		
2017	Royal Thai Fleet		
- * Club domestic league appearances and goals as of 27 May 2017

Supachai Kamsab (Thai: ศุภชัย ขำทรัพย์) is a Thai professional footballer.

== Career ==
Kamsab played in Thai League 1 with Rajnavy Rayong during 2009 and 2010.

Kamsab was playing in the semi-professional Thai League 4 with Royal Thai Fleet F.C. during 2017.
