= Tinnapob Srisathit =

Thai footballer

Personal information
- Full name: Tinnapob Srisathit
- Date of birth: 16 July 1985 (age 41)
- Place of birth: Kalasin, Thailand
- Height: 1.72 m (5 ft 7 1/2 in)
- Position: Striker

Team information
- Current team: Rajnavy Rayong
- Number: 20

Senior career*
Years	Team	Apps	(Gls)
2009–2012	Rajnavy Rayong		
2013–2014	Siam Navy		
2015–2016	Udon Thani	5	(0)
2017	Trat	0	(0)
- * Club domestic league appearances and goals as of 14 November 2008

Tinnapob Srisathit (Thai: ติณภพ ศรีสถิตย์) is a Thai professional footballer.
