= Surachet Phupa =

Thai footballer (born 1987)

Surachet Pupha
Personal information
- Full name: Surachet Pupha
- Date of birth: 22 January 1987 (age 39)
- Place of birth: Suphan Buri, Thailand
- Height: 1.75 m (5 ft 9 in)
- Position: Defender

Senior career*
Years	Team	Apps	(Gls)
2003–2005	Suphanburi		
2006–2008	Krung Thai Bank		
2009–2010	Bangkok Glass		
2010	Muangthong United		
2010	Chanthaburi		
- * Club domestic league appearances and goals as of 14 November 2008

Surachet Pupha (Thai: สุรเชษฎ์ ภูผา) is a retired professional footballer from Thailand. He is the older twin brother of Supachai Phupa (Thai: สุภชัย ภูผา). They played in the same team while they were with Suphanburi F.C., Krung Thai Bank F.C., Bangkok Glass F.C., Muangthong United F.C., and Chanthaburi F.C.

He played in Thai Premier League with teams Krung Thai Bank F.C., Bangkok Glass F.C.

== Asian Champions League Appearances ==
#	Date	Venue	Opponent	Score	Result
1.	March 12, 2008	Bangkok, Thailand	Kashima Antlers	1-9	Lost
2.	March 19, 2008	Beijing, China	Beijing Guoan	2-4	Lost
3.	April 9, 2008	Bangkok, Thailand	Nam Dinh	9-1	Won
4.	May 7, 2008	Kashima, Japan	Kashima Antlers	1-8	Lost
