= Chalermkiat Sombutpan =

Thai footballer

Personal information
- Full name: Chalermkiat Sombutpan
- Date of birth: 20 May 1985 (age 41)
- Place of birth: Chiang Rai, Thailand
- Height: 1.85 m (6 ft 1 in)
- Position: Goalkeeper

Senior career*
Years	Team	Apps	(Gls)
2013–2014	Chainat Hornbill	7	(0)
2015	Bangkok United		
2016	Bangkok Glass	0	(0)
2016–2018	Chiangmai		
2018–2021	Police Tero	6	(0)
- * Club domestic league appearances and goals

Chalermkiat Sombutpan (Thai: เฉลิมเกียรติ สมบัติปัน, born June 20, 1985) is a Thai professional footballer who plays as a goalkeeper for Thai League 1 club Police Tero.
