= Beckenbauer Seur-In =

Thai footballer

Personal information
- Full name: Beckenbauer Seur-In
- Date of birth: January 24, 1980 (age 46)
- Place of birth: Ayutthaya, Thailand
- Height: 1.74 m (5 ft 8 1/2 in)
- Position: Striker

Youth career
- 1994–1999: Suphanburi

Senior career*
| Years | Team | Apps | (Gls) |
| 2000–2002 | Suphanburi | 37 | (27) |
| 2003–2006 | Bangkok Bank | 46 | (18) |
| 2007–2009 | Suphanburi | 69 | (27) |
| 2009–2011 | Sriracha FC | 0 | (0) |
| 2011 | Ratchaburi FC | | |
| 2012–2013 | Thai Honda F.C. | | |

International career
| 2003–2004 | Thailand | 5 | (2) |
- * Club domestic league appearances and goals as of 14 November 2008

Beckenbauer Seur-In (Thai: เบคเคนบาวร์ เสืออินทร์, born January 24, 1980) is a Thai former professional footballer. He played for Sriracha FC in the Thai Division 1 League. He was born in Ayutthaya and was named after Franz Beckenbauer.
