= Paul Ekollo =

Cameroonian footballer

Personal information
- Full name: Paul Bekombo Ekollo Ntonye
- Date of birth: December 1, 1984 (age 41)
- Place of birth: Cameroon
- Height: 1.80 m (5 ft 11 in)
- Position: Striker

Senior career*
Years	Team	Apps	(Gls)
2005–2008	Balestier Khalsa		
2009	TTM Samut Sakhon		
2010–2011	Bangkok Glass		
2012	Pattaya United		
2013	Bangkok United		
2014	Saraburi		
2014	Sukhothai		
2015–2016	Chiangmai		
2018–	Muang Loei United		
- * Club domestic league appearances and goals

Paul Ekollo (born 1 December 1984) is a Cameroonian footballer.
