= Suttinan Nontee =

Thai footballer (born 1984)

Personal information
- Full name: Suttinan Nontee
- Date of birth: 1 April 1984 (age 42)
- Place of birth: Loei, Thailand
- Height: 1.69 m (5 ft 6 1/2 in)
- Position: Attacking midfielder

Senior career*
Years	Team	Apps	(Gls)
2009–2010	Rajnavy Rayong	29	(8)
2011	Chainat		
2012	Phitsanulok		
2013	Sisaket	2	(0)
2013	Roi Et United		
2014	Loei City		
2014	Sukhothai		
2015	Nakhon Pathom United		
2016–2017	Samut Songkhram		
- * Club domestic league appearances and goals as of 14 November 2008

Suttinan Nontee (Thai: สุทธินันท์ นนที, born April 1, 1984) is a retired professional footballer from Thailand.
