= Surapong Thammawongsa =

Thai footballer (born 1980)

Personal information
- Full name: Surapong Thammawongsa
- Date of birth: 11 September 1980 (age 46)
- Place of birth: Kalasin, Thailand
- Height: 1.65 m (5 ft 5 in)
- Position: Defensive midfielder

Youth career
- Debsirin School

Senior career*
Years	Team	Apps	(Gls)
2001–2007	Bangkok University	44	(13)
2008	Muangthong United	17	(3)
2009–2010	Police United	7	(1)
2011	Ayutthaya	22	(6)
2012	Hatyai	19	(0)
2012–2014	Rayong United	15	(0)
2015	Kalasin	10	(0)
Total		134	(23)

International career
2001	Thailand U23		

Managerial career
- 2016: Kalasin
- * Club domestic league appearances and goals as of 14 October 2008

Surapong Thammawongsa (Thai สุรพงษ์ ธรรมวงศา) is a Thai retired professional footballer.

== Honours ==
- Southeast Asian Games: 2001 with Thailand U23
- Thai Premier League: 2006 with Bangkok University
- Thailand Division 1 League: 2008 with Muangthong United
