= Krissadee Prakobkong =

Thai footballer (born 1984)

Personal information
- Full name: Krissadee Prakobkong
- Date of birth: 16 January 1984 (age 42)
- Place of birth: Chiang Rai, Thailand
- Height: 1.65 m (5 ft 5 in)
- Position: Left back

Senior career*
Years	Team	Apps	(Gls)
2007–2012	Police United	43	(2)
2012–2017	Chiangrai United	83	(0)
2018–2019	Chiangmai	9	(0)
Total		135	(2)

International career^{‡}
2008	Thailand	2	(0)

Managerial career
- 2019–: Chiangmai (assistant)
- * Club domestic league appearances and goals as of 24 October 2017 ‡ National team caps and goals as of 16 November 2008

Krissadee Prakobkong (Thai: กฤษฎี ประกอบของ, born January 16, 1984) is a Thai retired professional footballer who played as a left back.

== International career ==
On the back of performing extremely well in the Thailand 1st Division, Krissadee was called up to the full national side in coach Peter Reid's first squad announcement. He was called up with 35 other players to the 2008 T&T Cup hosted by Vietnam. He made his debut against North Korea on October 28, 2008 in the T&T Cup, and was a member of the victorious T&T Cup 2008-winning squad.

=== International ===
As of 12 November 2015

National team	Year	Apps	Goals
Thailand	2008	2	0
Thailand	Total	2	0

== Honours ==
=== International ===
Thailand

- T&T Cup: 2008

=== Club ===
Chiangrai United

- Thai FA Cup: 2017
