= Pradit Sawangsri =

Thai footballer (born 1978)

Personal information
- Full name: Pradit Sawangsri
- Date of birth: 24 March 1978 (age 48)
- Place of birth: Suphanburi, Thailand
- Height: 1.72 m (5 ft 7 1/2 in)
- Position: Right back

Team information
- Current team: Police United FC

Senior career*
Years	Team	Apps	(Gls)
2002–2004	Provincial Electricity Authority	33	(0)
2005–2008	Krung Thai Bank	61	(1)
2008–2009	Nakhon Pathom	9	(0)
2010–	Police United FC		
- * Club domestic league appearances and goals as of 14 November 2008

Pradit Sawangsri (Thai: ประดิษฐ์ สว่างศรี) is a Thai professional footballer. He currently plays for Police United FC in the Thailand Premier League.

He played for Krung Thai Bank FC in the 2008 AFC Champions League group stages.
