= Supachai Phupa =

Thai footballer (born 1987)

Supachai Pupha
Personal information
- Full name: Supachai Phupa
- Date of birth: 22 January 1987 (age 39)
- Place of birth: Suphan Buri, Thailand
- Height: 1.70 m (5 ft 7 in)
- Position: Right back

Senior career*
Years	Team	Apps	(Gls)
2003–2005	Suphanburi		
2006–2008	Krung Thai Bank		
2009–2010	Bangkok Glass		
2010	Muangthong United		
2010	Chanthaburi		
2010–2011	BEC Tero Sasana		
2012	Nakhon Ratchasima		
2013–2014	Ayutthaya		
2015–2017	Lampang		
- * Club domestic league appearances and goals as of 14 November 2008

Supachai Phupa (Thai: สุภชัย ภูผา) is a retired professional footballer from Thailand. He played in Thai Premier League with teams Krung Thai Bank F.C., Bangkok Glass F.C., BEC Tero Sasana F.C. While he was with Krung Thai, he played for the team in the 2008 AFC Champions League group stages.

He was also part of U-19 Thailand National Football Team and Thailand National Football Team in 2009 Southeast Asian Games.

He has an elder twin brother Surachet Phupa (Thai: สุรเชษฎ์ ภูผา) who is also a professional footballer and played in the same team while they were with Suphanburi F.C., Krung Thai Bank F.C., Bangkok Glass F.C., Muangthong United F.C., and Chanthaburi F.C.

== Playing career ==
He and his twin brother played football at right back and left back positions, respectively, while they were studying at Suphanburi Sports School and played well enough to become part of Thailand team to compete for AFC U-14 Championship. For their national team performance, they were noticed and signed with the local Division 1 football team Suphanburi F.C.

Both he and his twin brother were acquired by Thailand Premier League team Krung Thai Bank and played for them, including appearances in 2008 AFC Champions League games. They remained with the team when the right to Thailand Premier League team of Krung Thai Bank were transferred to Bangkok Glass in 2009 due to the requirement to register the football team as a corporate as required by Asian Football Confederation would violate Thai financial institution rules. Toward the end of 2009 season, both were not in Bangkok Glass's team building plan and were available for trade.

The twins had a brief stint at Muangthong United F.C., signing them in January 2010 after Bangkok Glass did not extend their contract. The pair then went to Chanthaburi F.C., but after poor performance after the 4th game of 2010 season, the team canceled the contracts of the coaching staffs, and later 9 players including both Supachai and Surachet on 26 April 2010 citing the policy of the new coach. Supachai then signed a two-year contract with another Thailand Premier League time BEC Tero Sasana F.C. on 4 November 2010. In early 2012, Nakhon Ratchasima F.C., a newly created team in Division 1 acquired Supachai and 2 other players from BEC Tero Sasana.

He signed with Ayuthaya F.C. for 2013 season. However he injured his knee in a home game on 29 June 2013 against Khonkaen F.C. Later examination found that his anterior cruciate ligament was torn and required season ending surgery. He signed back with Aythaya F.C. again for the second leg of 2014 season after recovery from the injury. He played for Lampang F.C. for the second leg of 2015 season till 2017 season.

== Asian Champions League appearances ==
#	Date	Venue	Opponent	Score	Result
1.	March 12, 2008	Bangkok, Thailand	Kashima Antlers	1-9	Lost
2.	March 19, 2008	Beijing, China	Beijing Guoan	2-4	Lost
3.	April 9, 2008	Bangkok, Thailand	Nam Dinh	9-1	Won
4.	May 7, 2008	Kashima, Japan	Kashima Antlers	1-8	Lost
