= 2009 Thai FA Cup final =

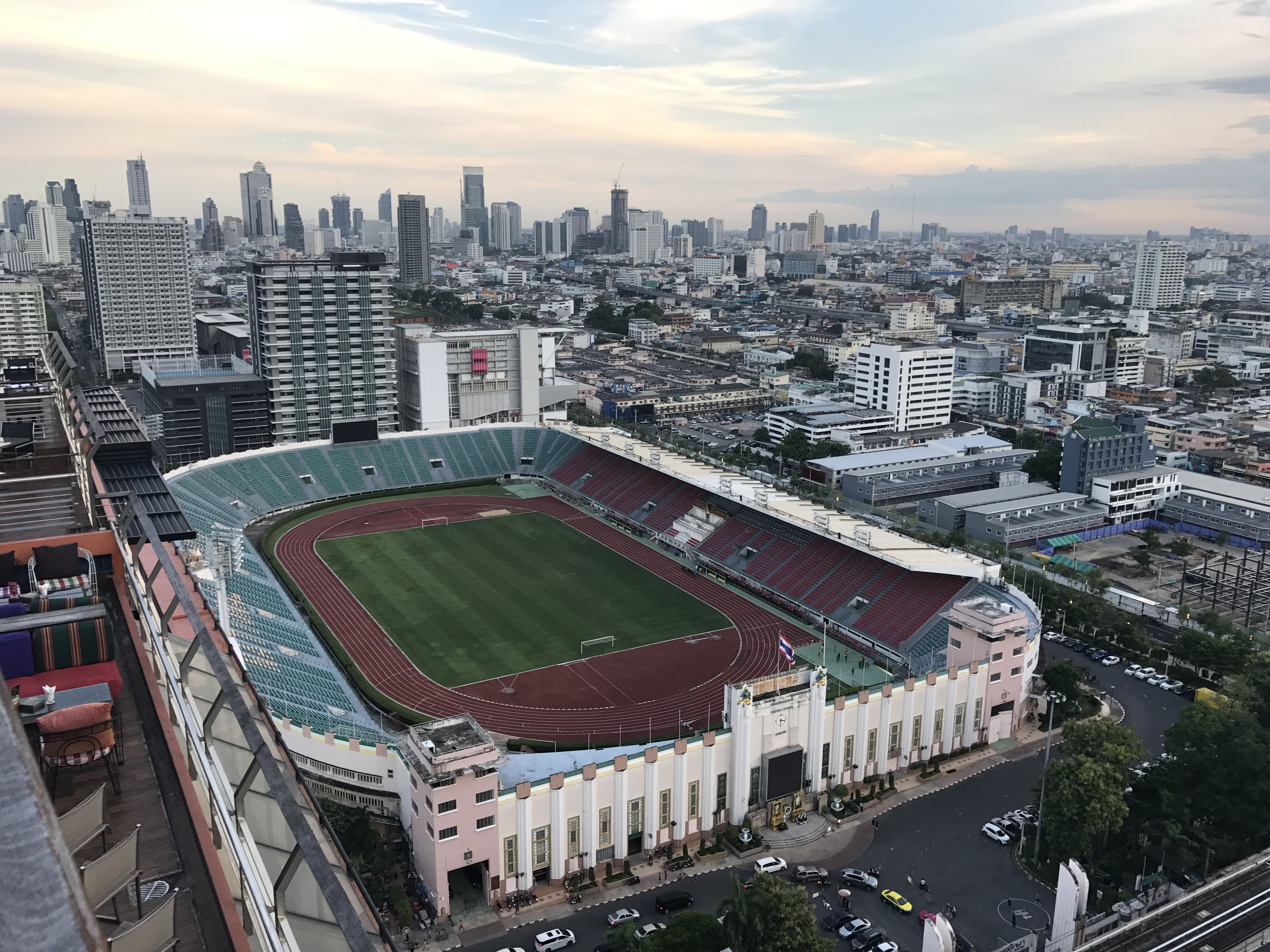
- The match took place at Supachalasai Stadium.
- Event: 2009 Thai FA Cup
Thai Port	BEC Tero Sasana
1	1
- Thai Port won 5–4 on penalties
- Date: 23 October 2009
- Venue: Suphachalasai Stadium, Bangkok
- Referee: Chaiya Mahaprab
- Attendance: 20,000

The 2009 Thai FA Cup final was the 16th final of the Thailand's domestic football cup competition, the FA Cup. The final was played at Suphachalasai Stadium in Bangkok on 23 October 2009. The match was contested by Thai Port, who beat Osotspa Saraburi 2–0 in their semi-final, and BEC Tero Sasana who beat TTM Samut Sakhon 3–0 on penalty shoot-out after 3–3 draw in the match. After Wuttichai Tathong opened the scoring in 14th minute, Edvaldo equalised in the 23rd minute before the draw and Thai Port beat BEC Tero Sasana after a penalty shoot-out.

== Road to the final ==
Note: In all results below, the score of the finalist is given first (H: home; A: away; TPL: Clubs from Thai Premier League; D1: Clubs from Thai Division 1 League; D2: Clubs from Regional League Division 2).

Thai Port (TPL)		Round	BEC Tero Sasana (TPL)	
Opponent	Result	Knockout 1 leg	Opponent	Result
Rajnavy Rayong (TPL)	2–1 (A)	Round of 32	Songkhla (D1)	4–3 (H)
Police United (D1)	1–0 (H)	Round of 16	Chanthaburi (D1)	2–0 (A)
Nakhon Ratchasima (D2)	3–1 (H)	Quarter-finals	Bangkok United (TPL)	2–0 (H)
Osotspa Saraburi (TPL)	2–0 (A)	Semi-finals	TTM Samut Sakhon (TPL)	3–3 (a.e.t.) (3–0p) (A)

== Match ==
=== Summary ===
BEC Tero Sasana took the lead in the 14th minute when Wuttichai Tathong headed home an inviting cross from Noppol Pitafai. However, Thai Port drew level nine minutes later when Edvaldo scored after the ball rebounded off BEC Tero goalkeeper Sivaruck Tedsungnoen. The score remained until the end of extra time, forcing both teams into a penalty shoot-out.

=== Details ===
2009-10-23
17.00 UTC+7

Thai Port	1 – 1 (a.e.t.)	BEC Tero Sasana
Edvaldo 23'	report	Wuttichai 14'
Penalties
Edvaldo (penalty scored); Teerawut (penalty scored); Olan (penalty scored); Moise (penalty scored); Pipat (penalty scored)	5 – 4	(penalty scored) Anon; (penalty scored) Chakrit; (penalty scored) Prat; (penalty scored) Wuttichai; (penalty missed) Thritthi

Suphachalasai Stadium
Attendance: 20,000
Referee: Chaiya Mahaprab

Thai Port	BEC Tero Sasana

GK	1	(Thailand) Pattarakorn Thanganuruck
RB	22	(Brazil) Mário César
CB	28	(Thailand) Itthipol Nonsiri (c)
CB	26	(Thailand) Alef Poh-ji	(substituted off) 113'
LB	36	(Cameroon) Moudourou Moise
CM	33	(Thailand) Ekkachai Sumrei
CM	11	(Thailand) Jirawat Makarom
CM	17	(Thailand) Pongpipat Kamnuan
AM	27	(Thailand) Kiatjarern Ruangparn	(substituted off) 70'
CF	18	(Brazil) Edvaldo
CF	10	(Thailand) Pipat Thonkanya
Substitutes:
GK	39	(Cameroon) Munze Ulrich
DF	14	(Thailand) Songsak Chaisamak
DF	15	(Thailand) Jetsada Phulek
MF	7	(Thailand) Kay Langkawong
MF	12	(Thailand) Teerawut Sanphan	(substituted on) 113'
MF	30	(Thailand) Olan Limsampansanti	(substituted on) 70'
FW	31	(Thailand) Attaphong Wongsunthorn
FW	37	(Thailand) Wisut Bunpheng
Manager:
(Thailand) Sasom Pobpraserd

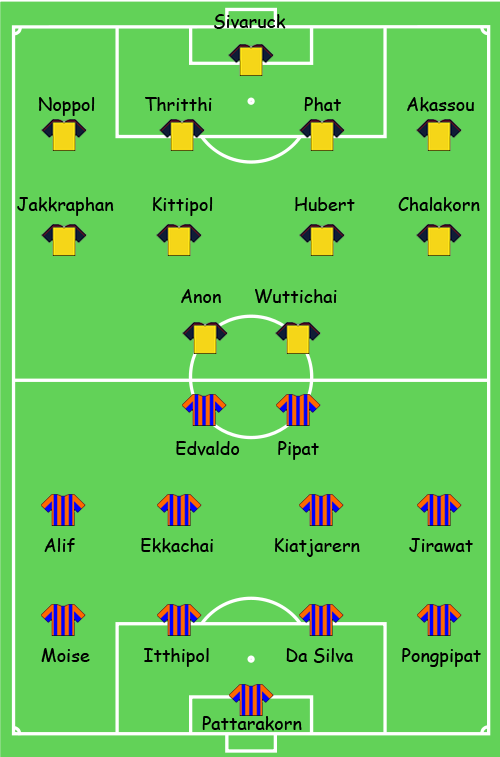

GK	1	(Thailand) Sivaruck Tedsungnoen
RB	25	(Madagascar) Guy Hubert
CB	3	(Thailand) Thritthi Nonsrichai (c)	(yellow card) 62'
CB	5	(Thailand) Prat Samakrat
LB	10	(Ivory Coast) Jean-Baptiste Akassou		(substituted off) 107'
CM	2	(Thailand) Noppol Pitafai
CM	4	(Thailand) Jakkaphan Kaewprom
CM	6	(Thailand) Chalakorn Sa-nguandee		(substituted off) 70'
AM	7	(Thailand) Kittipol Paphunga		(substituted off) 13'
CF	14	(Thailand) Wuttichai Tathong
CF	17	(Thailand) Anon Sangsanoi
Substitutes:
GK	20	(Thailand) Pisan Dorkmaikaew
GK	30	(Thailand) Intharat Apinyakool
DF	15	(Thailand) Paisarn Sang-arun
DF	16	(Thailand) Narat Munin-noppamart
DF	23	(Thailand) Tassana Cheamsa-art
MF	8	(Thailand) Pichit Jaiboon		(substituted on) 107'
FW	11	(Thailand) Chakrit Buathong		(substituted on) 70'
FW	13	(Thailand) Narej Karpkraikaew		(substituted on) 13'
FW	19	(Thailand) Panai Kongpraphan
Manager:
(Thailand) Tawan Sripan

Match rules:

- 90 minutes.
- 30 minutes of extra time if necessary.
- Penalty shootout if scores still level.
- Nine named substitutes.
- Maximum of 3 substitutions.
