= 2026 Thai FA Cup final =

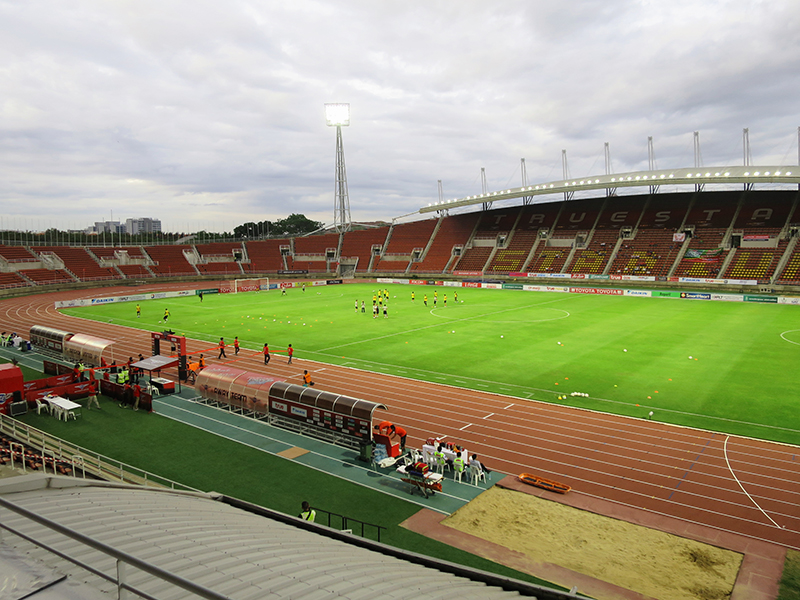
- The match took place at Thammasat Stadium.
- Event: 2025–26 Thai FA Cup
Buriram United	PT Prachuap
1	0
- After extra time
- Date: 31 May 2026
- Venue: Thammasat Stadium, Khlong Luang, Pathum Thani
- Man of the Match: Sasalak Haiprakhon (Buriram United)
- Referee: Torphong Somsing (Thailand)
- Attendance: 13,213
- Weather: Fair; 29 °C (84 °F) humidity 79%

The 2026 Thai FA Cup final is the culmination of the 2025–26 Thai FA Cup, the 32nd season of Thailand's premier domestic knockout football competition. The final was played on 31 May 2026 at Thammasat Stadium in Pathum Thani, Thailand, and was contested by the Thai League 1 clubs, Buriram United and PT Prachuap. Buriram United won 1–0 after extra time following a goalless draw in regular time, claiming a record-extending eighth Thai FA Cup title.

Buriram United, based in Buriram province in Northeastern Thailand, entered the final as one of the most successful clubs in Thai football history. The appearance marked the club's ninth Thai FA Cup final, having won the competition a record seven times in 2011 (as Buriram PEA), 2012, 2013, 2015, 2022, 2023, and 2025, while finishing as runners-up in 2018. Meanwhile, PT Prachuap, based in Prachuap Khiri Khan province in Western Thailand, reached the Thai FA Cup final for the first time in the club's history. After winning the 2014 Regional League Division 2 title, the club gradually rose through the Thai football pyramid before earning promotion to Thai League 1 in 2018. Since then, PT Prachuap has remained a stable Thai League 1 side and previously won the Thai League Cup in 2019, their only major domestic title to date. Despite both clubs' histories in Thai football, this was the first meeting between Buriram United and PT Prachuap in a Thai FA Cup final.

As Buriram United had already secured qualification for the 2026–27 AFC Champions League Elite league phase as the 2025–26 Thai League 1 champions, the berth associated with the Thai FA Cup was passed down through the league standings, resulting in Ratchaburi qualifying for the competition. As Buriram United completed a domestic double by winning both the league and the FA Cup, the 2026 Thailand Champions Cup will be contested between the champions and runners-up of the 2025–26 Thai League 1 season.

== Route to the final ==
Buriram United (T1)			Round	PT Prachuap (T1)		
Opponent	Result		Knockout 1 leg	Opponent	Result	
Warin Chamrap (TS)	12–0 (H)	Highlight	Round of 64	Chiangmai United (T2)	6–2 (A)	Highlight
Customs United (T3)	5–1 (A)	Highlight	Round of 32	Uthai Thani (T1)	1–0 (A)	Highlight
Pattani (T2)	4–0 (H)	Highlight	Round of 16	BG Pathum United (T1)	1–0 (H)	Highlight
Khon Kaen United (T2)	6–0 (H)	Highlight	Quarter-finals	Chiangrai United (T1)	1–0 (A)	Highlight
Ayutthaya United (T1)	5–0 (N)	Highlight	Semi-finals	Lamphun Warriors (T1)	1–0 (N)	Highlight

Note: In all results above, the score of the finalist is given first (H: home; A: away; T1: Clubs from Thai League 1; T2: Clubs from Thai League 2; T3: Clubs from Thai League 3; TS: Clubs from Thailand Semi-pro League; TA: Clubs from Thailand Amateur League.

=== Buriram United ===
Buriram United began their campaign in the round of 64 with a dominant 12–0 home victory over Warin Chamrap of the Thailand Semi-pro League. Fejsal Mulić scored a hat-trick, including one penalty, while Ilhan Fandi and Thanakrit Chotmuangpak each added two goals. Further goals came from Athit Berg, Ratthanakorn Maikami, Narubadin Weerawatnodom, and Shinnaphat Leeaoh, while Thiraphon Phrinphun scored an own goal. In the round of 32, Buriram United defeated Customs United of the Thai League 3 5–1 away from home, with Guilherme Bissoli scoring a hat-trick alongside goals from Suphanat Mueanta and Thanakrit Chotmuangpak. They continued their strong form in the round of 16 with a 4–0 home victory over Pattani of the Thai League 2, as Bissoli netted another hat-trick and Rubén Sánchez added a fourth goal. In the quarter-finals, Buriram overwhelmed Khon Kaen Unitedof the Thai League 2 6–0 at home, with Robert Žulj scoring three times, while Emmanuel Toku added two goals and Nathakorn Rattanasuwan scored once. The semi-finals saw Buriram United face Ayutthaya United of the Thai League 1 at a neutral venue, where they secured a comprehensive 5–0 victory. Sandy Walsh scored twice, while Kingsley Schindler, Supachai Chaided, and Robert Žulj also found the net to send Buriram into another FA Cup final.

=== PT Prachuap ===
PT Prachuap opened their campaign with a 6–2 away victory over Chiangmai United of the Thai League 2 in the round of 64. Goals came from Édgar Méndez, Iklas Sanron, who scored twice, Adrian Ugelvik, Tauã, and Chaowat Veerachat. In the round of 32, PT Prachuap edged past Uthai Thani of the Thai League 1 with a narrow 1–0 away victory courtesy of a goal from Tauã. They followed this with another 1–0 win in the round of 16, defeating BG Pathum United of the Thai League 1 at home through a goal from Michel. The quarter-finals saw PT Prachuap claim a third consecutive 1–0 victory, this time away to Chiangrai United of the Thai League 1, with Michel converting the decisive penalty. In the semi-finals, they defeated Lamphun Warriors of the Thai League 1 1–0 at a neutral venue thanks to a goal from Bernardo Vilar, securing the club's first-ever appearance in a Thai FA Cup final.

== Match ==
=== Details ===
31 May 2026
19:00 UTC+7

Buriram United	1–0 (a.e.t.)	PT Prachuap
Robert Žulj 94'	Report; Highlight

Thammasat Stadium,
Khlong Luang, Pathum Thani
Attendance: 13,213
Referee: Torphong Somsing (Thailand)

Buriram United	PT Prachuap

Lineups:
GK	13	(Philippines) Neil Etheridge
RB	19	(Ghana) Kingsley Schindler		(yellow card) 80'	(substituted off) 91'
CB	22	(South Korea) Ko Myeong-seok			(substituted off) 80'
CB	6	(Australia) Curtis Good
LB	2	(Thailand) Sasalak Haiprakhon		(yellow card) 20'
DM	16	(Thailand) Kenny Dougall (c)		(yellow card) 111'
CM	32	(Austria) Robert Žulj	94'	(yellow card) 99'
CM	5	(Thailand) Theerathon Bunmathan
RF	9	(Thailand) Supachai Chaided		(yellow card) 39'
CF	7	(Brazil) Guilherme Bissoli
LF	10	(Thailand) Suphanat Mueanta			(substituted off) 67'
Substitutes:
GK	34	(Thailand) Chatchai Budprom
DF	3	(Thailand) Pansa Hemviboon
DF	14	(Indonesia) Sandy Walsh
DF	15	(Thailand) Narubadin Weerawatnodom			(substituted on) 91'
DF	75	(Thailand) Shinnaphat Leeaoh		(yellow card) 84'	(substituted on) 67'
MF	8	(Thailand) Ratthanakorn Maikami
MF	26	(Ghana) Emmanuel Toku
MF	27	(Thailand) Phitiwat Sukjitthammakul			(substituted on) 80'
MF	33	(Thailand) Thanakrit Chotmuangpak
FW	17	(Singapore) Ilhan Fandi
FW	54	(Thailand) Nathakorn Rattanasuwan
Head Coach:
(England) Mark Jackson

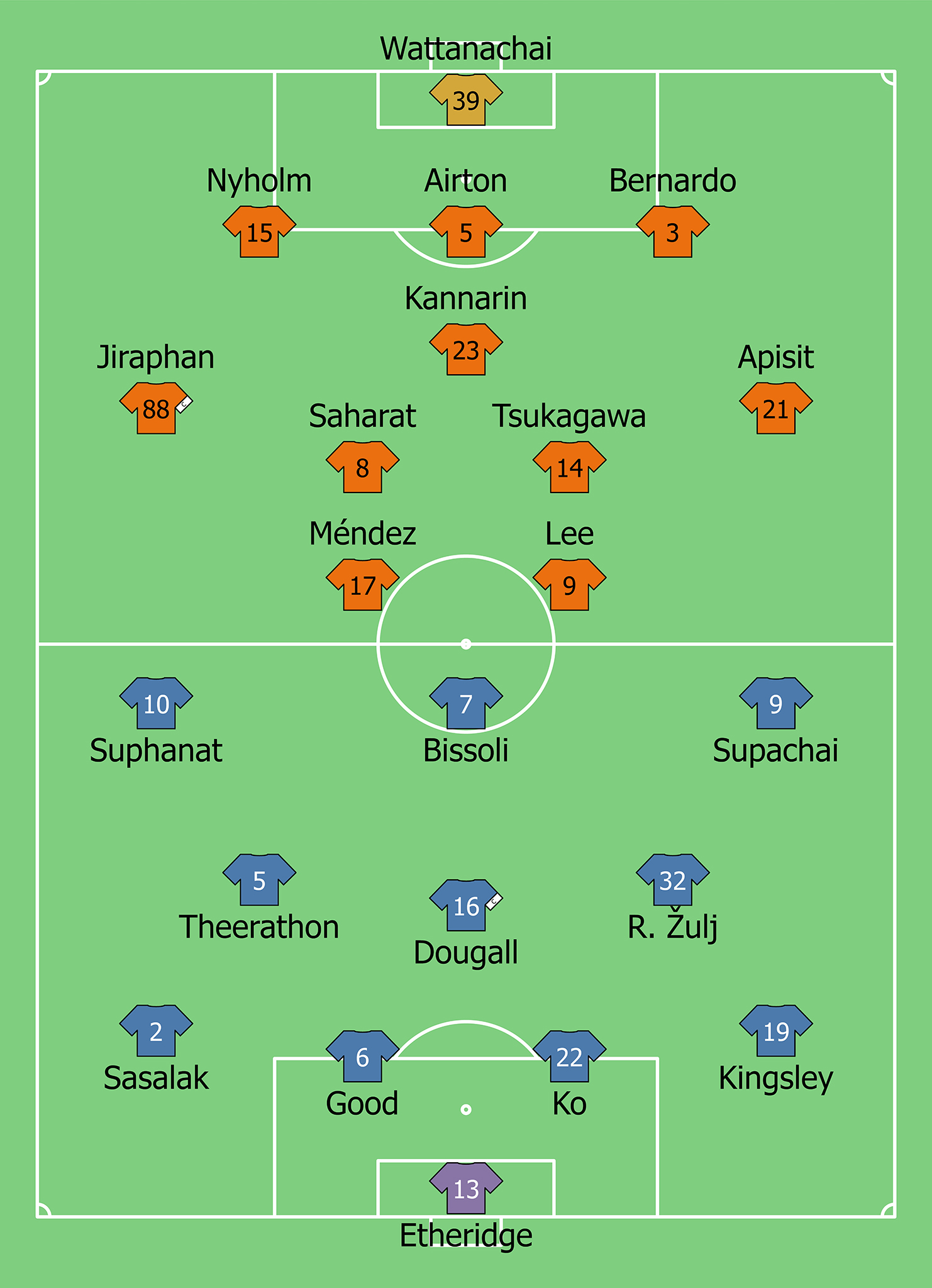

Lineups:
GK	39	(Thailand) Wattanachai Srathongjan
CB	15	(Philippines) Jesper Nyholm		(substituted off) 102'
CB	5	(Brazil) Airton	(yellow card) 85'
CB	3	(Brazil) Bernardo Vilar
DM	23	(Thailand) Kannarin Thawornsak
RM	88	(Thailand) Jiraphan Phasukhan (c)		(substituted off) 76'
CM	8	(Thailand) Saharat Kanyaroj		(substituted off) 63'
CM	14	(Japan) Koki Tsukagawa		(substituted off) 95'
LM	21	(Thailand) Apisit Sorada	(yellow card) 34'	(substituted off) 46'
CF	17	(Spain) Édgar Méndez	(yellow card) 11' (red card) 105+2'
CF	9	(South Korea) Lee Jeong-hyeop		(substituted off) 63'
Substitutes:
GK	1	(Thailand) Rattanai Songsangchan
DF	2	(Thailand) Oussama Thiangkham
DF	66	(Thailand) Wanchat Choosong	(yellow card) 98'	(substituted on) 76'
DF	74	(Thailand) Phon-Ek Jensen		(substituted on) 46'
MF	30	(Thailand) Jittiphat Wasungnoen
MF	40	(Thailand) Chaowat Veerachat
MF	70	(Thailand) Prasit Jantum
FW	10	(Brazil) Tauã	(yellow card) 105+1'	(substituted on) 95'
FW	11	(Thailand) Iklas Sanron		(substituted on) 63'
FW	20	(Brazil) Michel		(substituted on) 63'
FW	47	(Thailand) Chitsanuphong Phimpsang
FW	48	(Thailand) Jehhanafee Mamah	(yellow card) 113'	(substituted on) 102'
Head Coach:
(Thailand) Sasom Pobprasert

Assistant referees:
(Thailand) Pattarapong Kijsathit
(Thailand) Natthaphon Mala
Fourth official:
(Thailand) Chaireag Ngam-som
Assistant VAR:
(Thailand) Mongkolchai Pechsri
(Thailand) Kitisak Pikunngoen
Match Commissioner:
(Thailand) Theerachoat Kranrakrien
Referee Assessor:
(Thailand) Mongkol Rungklay
General Coordinator:
(Thailand) Janjira Sungkhao

MATCH RULES

- 90 minutes.
- 30 minutes extra-time if necessary.
- Penalty shoot-out if still necessary.
- Maximum of 5 substitutions.

=== Statistics ===
First half
Statistic	Buriram United	PT Prachuap
Goals scored	0	0
Total shots	6	1
Shots on target	2	0
Saves	0	2
Ball possession	65%	35%
Total passes	234	129
Corner kicks	0	0
Offsides	0	1
Yellow cards	2	2
Red cards	0	0

Second half
Statistic	Buriram United	PT Prachuap
Goals scored	0	0
Total shots	5	4
Shots on target	0	2
Saves	2	0
Ball possession	69%	31%
Total passes	252	116
Corner kicks	5	2
Offsides	0	0
Yellow cards	2	1
Red cards	0	0

Extra time
Statistic	Buriram United	PT Prachuap
Goals scored	1	0
Total shots	3	0
Shots on target	3	0
Saves	0	2
Ball possession	67%	33%
Total passes	153	81
Corner kicks	2	2
Offsides	0	0
Yellow cards	2	3
Red cards	0	1

Overall
Statistic	Buriram United	PT Prachuap
Goals scored	1	0
Total shots	14	5
Shots on target	5	2
Saves	2	4
Ball possession	67%	33%
Total passes	639	326
Corner kicks	7	4
Offsides	0	1
Yellow cards	6	6
Red cards	0	1

== Winner ==
2025–26 Thai FA Cup
Winners
Buriram United
Eighth title

=== Prizes for winner ===
- A champion trophy.
- 5,000,000 THB prize money.
- Qualification to 2026–27 AFC Champions League Elite league phase.
- Qualification to 2026 Thailand Champions Cup

=== Prizes for runners-up ===
- 1,000,000 THB prize money.
