= Singhtarua F.C. in Asian football =

Singhtarua Football Club is a Thai football club based in Bangkok. The club was founded in 1967 and has competed in the Thai football league system since and was a founding member of the TPL in 1996. They have competed in the Asian Club Championship on two seasons under the name of Port Authority of Thailand. In 2010, they entered the AFC Cup for the first time, after won the 2009 Thai FA Cup.

== Asian Club Championship ==
=== 1986-87 Asian Club Championship ===
Selangor FA (Malaysia)	1 - 0	Port Authority of Thailand

Kuala Lumpur, Malaysia

Selangor FA (Malaysia)	1 - 0	Port Authority of Thailand

Kuala Lumpur, Malaysia

=== 1991-92 Asian Club Championship ===
==== Group A ====
Team	Pts	Pld	W	D	L	GF	GA	GD
(Qatar) Al Rayyan	6	3	3	0	0	8	3	+5
(United Arab Emirates) Al Shabab	4	3	2	0	1	6	4	+2
(Thailand) Port Authority	2	3	1	0	2	6	7	−1
(Bangladesh) Mohammedan SC	0	3	0	0	3	3	9	−6

Match 1	Al Rayyan	3–1	Port Authority
Match 2	Al Shabab	2–1	Mohammedan SC
Match 3	Port Authority	4–1	Mohammedan SC
Match 3	Al Rayyan	2–1	Al Shabab
Match 3	Al Rayyan	3–1	Mohammedan SC
Match 3	Al Shabab	3–1	Port Authority

== AFC Cup ==
=== 2010 AFC Cup ===
==== Group stage ====
24 February 2010
17:00 UTC+7

Thai Port (Thailand)	2–3	(Vietnam) Đà Nẵng
Jirawat 18'; Pitipong 90+2'	Report	Gaston 29'; Hernández 59'; Phan Thanh Hung 84'

Suphachalasai Stadium, Bangkok
Attendance: 400
Referee: Fan Qi (China)

17 March 2010
20:00 UTC+8

NT Realty Wofoo Tai Po (Hong Kong)	0–1	(Thailand) Thai Port
		Pitipong 48'

Tseung Kwan O Sports Ground, Hong Kong

24 March 2010
17:00 UTC+7

Thai Port (Thailand)	2–2	(Singapore) Geylang United
Jirawat ?'; Sompong ?'		Moise ?' (o.g.); Tomko ?'

Suphachalasai Stadium, Bangkok

6 April 2010
19:30 (UTC+8)

Geylang United (Singapore)	0–1	(Thailand) Thai Port
	Report	Kiatjarern 58'

Jalan Besar Stadium, Singapore
Attendance: 1,120
Referee: Matsuo Hajime (Japan)

20 April 2010
16:00 UTC+7

Đà Nẵng (Vietnam)	0–0	(Thailand) Thai Port

Chi Lăng Stadium, Da Nang

27 April 2010
17:00 UTC+7

Thai Port (Thailand)	v	(Hong Kong) NT Realty Wofoo Tai Po

Suphachalasai Stadium, Bangkok

== Overall record ==
=== By competition ===
Competition	Pld	W	D	L	GF	GA	GD
Asian Club Championship	5	1	0	4	6	9	-3
AFC Cup	6	3	2	1	8	5	+3
Total	11	4	2	5	14	14	0

=== By country ===
Country	Pld	W	D	L	GF	GA	GD
Bangladesh	1	1	0	0	4	1	+1
Hong Kong	2	2	0	0	3	0	+3
Malaysia	2	0	0	2	0	2	-2
Qatar	1	0	0	1	1	3	-2
Singapore	2	1	1	0	3	2	+1
(United Arab Emirates) UAE	1	0	0	1	1	3	-2
Vietnam	2	0	1	1	2	3	-1
