= 2009 Thai FA Cup =

Tournament details
- Country: Thailand
- Dates: 27 June 2009 – 23 October 2009
- Teams: 78

Final positions
- Champions: Thai Port (1st title)
- Runners-up: BEC Tero Sasana

The Thai FA Cup 2009 (Thai: มูลนิธิไทยคม เอฟเอคัพ) was the 16th season of Thailand knockout football competition. The competition started on 27 June 2009 and concluded with the final on 21 October 2009. It was the first time the competition was held in 8 years. The tournament is organized by the Football Association of Thailand.

The cup winner were guaranteed a place in the 2010 AFC Cup.

== Qualifying round ==
All of the 28 teams came from Division 2, Khǒr Royal Cup, Khor Royal Cup and Ngor Royal Cup. Because the FAT added teams from the Recruitment Team leagues, teams 32 To 47 had to face a qualifying round before entering the first round proper.

Date	team	Score	team
June 27	Rose Asia Pathum Thani	1 – 2	Samut Prakan
June 27	Chainat	1 – 1 (5 – 6 p)	Nakhon Ratchasima
June 27	Chandrakasem Rajabhat University	1 – 0	Kasem Bundit University
June 28	Pathum Tani University	1 – 3	Southeast Bangkok College
June 28	Bangkok North Central ASSN	1 – 1 (3 – 4 p)	Thai Summit Samut Prakan
June 28	Bangpa-in School	1 – 0	Bangkok Sananruka IPE
June 28	Suke Kokee	1 – 0	J.W. Group

Date	team	Score	team
June 28	Raj Pracha	1 – 1 (3 – 5 p)	Surin FC
June 28	Dhurakij Pundit University	2 – 2 (4 – 6 p)	Bangkok Glass SA
June 29	Rajdamnern-Thonburi CC	3 – 0	Hakka FC
June 29	Thonburi University	0 – 2	Sutiwararam Alumnus Association
June 29	Christian-Thai	0 – 2	Ku Kot Municipality
June 30	Ratchaphruek College	1 – 0	Ubon United
	Assumption College Sriracha	Withdraw	Loei City

== First round ==
Date	team	Score	team
July 1	Ban Thungkled-VR Klang	2 – 2 (5 – 7 p)	Samut Prakan
July 1	Tak FC	1 – 4	Nakhon Ratchasima
July 1	Phitsanulok	0 – 1	Chankasem Rajabhat University
July 1	Cha Choeng Sao	1 – 1 (3 – 4 p)	Southeast Bangkok College
July 1	Raj-Vithi	1 – 1 (2 – 3 p)	Thai Summit Samut Prakan
July 1	Bangkok Christian College	6 – 0	Bangpa-in School
July 4	Vongchavalitkul University AA	1 – 1 (4 – 3 p)	Suke Kokee
July 4	Assumption College Thonburi	1 – 4	Bangkok Glass SA

Date	team	Score	team
July 4	Krungkao SA	3 – 1	Sutiwararam Alumnus Association
July 4	Dhummanusorn Foundation	1 – 1 (4 – 3 p)	Dhumrong Thai FC
July 8	Pattaya 8 School	3 – 3 (6 – 5 p)	Surin FC
July 8	Chiangmai United	1 – 2	Rajdamnern-Thonburi CC
July 8	Udon Thani	2 – 3	Ku Kot Municipality
July 8	Rayong	1 – 0	Ratchaphruek College
July 8	Kamphaeng Phet FC	0 – 2	Assumption College Sriracha
July 8	Debsirin Alumni Association	1 – 1 (5 – 2 p)	Phuket FC

== Second round ==
Date	Home	Score	Awey
July 15	Samut Prakan	1 – 1 (2 – 4 p)	Krungkao SA
July 15	Police United	3 – 0	Thai Summit Samut Prakan
July 15	Nakhon Ratchasima	2 – 1	Royal Thai Army
July 16	Chankasem Rajabhat University	1 – 2	Pattaya 8 School
July 18	Southeast Bangkok College	1 – 2	Sisaket
July 18	PTT	5 – 0	Assumption College Sriracha
July 18	Khonkaen	3 – 2	Air and Coastal Defense Command
July 18	Surat Thani	2 – 1	Ku Kot Municipality

Date	Home	Score	Awey
July 19	Royal Thai Air Force	0 – 2	Customs Department FC
July 19	Debsirin Alumni Association	0 – 3	Rattana Bundit
July 19	Thai Airways-Ban Bueng	0 – 1	Chanthaburi
July 19	Songkhla	1 – 0	Prachinburi
July 19	Dhummanusorn Foundation	1 – 3	Bangkok Glass SA
July 19	Nakhon Sawan	1 – 1 (6 – 4 p)	Thai Honda
July 22	Rajdamnern-Thonburi CC	1 – 4	Bangkok Christian College
July 22	Vongchavalitkul University AA	0 – 0 (3 – 1 p)	Rayong

== Third round ==
Date	Home	Score	Awey
July 29	Nakhon Pathom	3 – 3 (8 – 9 p)	Sriracha
July 29	TTM Samut Sakhon	1 – 0	PTT
July 29	Rajnavy Rayong	1 – 2	Thai Port
July 29	Nakhon Ratchasima	0 – 0 (4 – 2 p)	Customs Department
August 5	Chanthaburi	4 – 0	Bangkok Christian College
August 5	Khonkaen	0 – 0 (4 – 3 p)	Samut Songkhram
August 5	Osotsapa M-150	3 – 1	Bangkok Glass SA
August 5	Police United	2 – 1	Chula United

Date	Home	Score	Awey
August 19	BEC Tero Sasana	4 – 3	Songkhla
August 19	Bangkok Glass	1 – 0	Muang Thong United
August 19	Rattana Bundit	1 – 2	Krungkao SA
August 26	PEA	7 – 1	Nakhon Sawan
August 26	Pattaya 8 School	1 – 4	Chonburi
August 26	Vongchavalitkul University AA	2 – 5	Pattaya United
August 26	Sisaket	1 – 1 (5 – 6 p)	Surat Thani
August 26	TOT	1 – 2	Bangkok United

== Fourth round ==
2009-09-02
17.00 UTC+7

Surat Thani	1–0	Khonkaen
Sorayuth Jundibe 80'	report

Surat Thani Stadium

2009-09-02
18.00 UTC+7

Nakhon Ratchasima	1 – 1 (a.e.t.)	Pattaya United
Pratheep Supapong 23'	Report	46' Amorn Thammanarm
Penalties
Uthai Pue-ngeon (penalty scored); Jiranuwat Thiprod (penalty scored); Prompong Kansumrong (penalty scored); Kongnatee Boonma (penalty scored); Surachet Jarernsuk (penalty missed)	4–3	(penalty scored) Santi Chaiyaphurk; (penalty missed) Phaisan Pona; (penalty scored) Rangsarit Sutthisa; (penalty scored) Ittipol Poolsap; (penalty missed) Sompob Nilwong

5th December Stadium
Attendance: 3,360

2009-09-09
17.00 UTC+7

Thai Port	1–0	Police United
Pipat Thonkanya 70'	Report

PAT Stadium

2009-09-09
18.00 UTC+7

Sriracha	1–4	Bangkok United
Umpai Mutaporn 4'	Report	6' (o.g.) Yordrak Namuangrak; 36' Noppol Pol-udom; 48' Ramthep Chaipan; 70' Suphasek Kaikaew

Princess Sirindhorn Stadium

2009-09-16
16.00 UTC+7

Chanthaburi	0–2	BEC Tero Sasana
	Report	49' Wuttichai Tathong; 89' Anon Sangsanoi

Chanthaburi Stadium

2009-09-16
17.00 UTC+7

PEA	0–1	TTM Samut Sakhon
	Report	64' Bekombo Ekollo

Ayutthaya Stadium

2009-09-23
17.30 UTC+7

Krungkao SA	0–6	Bangkok Glass
	Report	18' Anawin Jujeen; 43' Supachai Komsilp; 56' Koné Kassim; 73' Peeraphong; 75' Nantawat Tansopa; 83' Polawat Wangkahart

Ayutthaya Stadium

2009-09-23
17.00 UTC+7

Osotsapa M-150	2–1	Chonburi
Sarayoot Chaikamdee 44'; Kabfah Boonmatoon 58'	Report	71' Jean Marc Benie

Saraburi Central Stadium

== Quarter-finals ==
2009-09-30
15.30 UTC+7

BEC Tero Sasana	2–0	Bangkok United
Anon Sangsanoi 34'; Jakkraphan Kaewprom 50'	report

BEC Tero Sasana Nong Chok Stadium

2009-09-30
17.00 UTC+7

Bangkok Glass	2 – 2 (a.e.t.)	Osotsapa M-150
Amnaj Kaewkiew 12'; Ajayi Samuel 103'	report	56' Suradej Thongchai; 110' Kabfah Boonmatoon
Penalties
Nantawat Tansopa (penalty missed); Supachai Komsilp (penalty scored); Anawin Jujeen (penalty missed)	1–4	(penalty scored) Patipon Petchwiset; (penalty scored) Siwamed Tanusorn; (penalty scored) Wanmai Setthanan; (penalty scored) Christian Ayew Egba

Queen Sirikit's 60th Anniversary Stadium

2009-09-30
17.00 UTC+7

TTM Samut Sakhon	3–0	Surat Thani
Worawut Wangsawad 40'; Tanongsak Promdard 42'; Narong Jansawek 45'	report

Institute of Physical Education Samut Sakhon Stadium

2009-09-30
17.00 UTC+7

Thai Port	3–1	Nakhon Ratchasima
Moudourou Swa Moise 51'; Jirawat Makarom 52'; Edvaldo 69'	report	91' (o.g.) Moudourou Swa Moise

PAT Stadium

== Semi-finals ==
2009-10-14
17.00 UTC+7

Osotspa Saraburi	0–2	Thai Port
	report	64' Pipat Thonkanya; 90+3' Ekkachai Sumrei

Saraburi Central Stadium

2009-10-14
17.00 UTC+7

TTM Samut Sakhon	3 – 3 (a.e.t.)	BEC Tero Sasana
Worawut Wangsawad 37', 76'; Bekombo Ekollo 88'	report	14' Anon Sangsanoi; 19' Jakkraphan Kaewprom; 66' Wuttichai Tathong
Penalties
Worawut Wangsawad (penalty missed); Peeratat Phoruendee (penalty missed); Kwanchai Fuangprakob (penalty missed)	0–3	(penalty missed) Anon Sangsanoi; (penalty scored) Prat Samakrat; (penalty scored) Guy Hubert; (penalty scored) Thritthi Nonsrichai

Institute of Physical Education Samut Sakhon Stadium
Attendance: 5,004

== Final ==
2009-10-23
17.00 UTC+7

Thai Port	1 – 1 (a.e.t.)	BEC Tero Sasana
Edvaldo 23'	report	Wuttichai Tathong 14'
Penalties
Edvaldo (penalty scored); Teerawut Sanphan (penalty scored); Olan Limsampansanti (penalty scored); Moudourou Swa Moise (penalty scored); Pipat Thonkanya (penalty scored)	5–4	(penalty scored) Anon Sangsanoi; (penalty scored) Chakrit Buathong; (penalty scored) Prat Samakrat; (penalty scored) Wuttichai Tathong; (penalty missed) Thritthi Nonsrichai

Suphachalasai Stadium
Attendance: 20,000
Referee: Chaiya Mahaprab

Thailand FA Cup
2009 Winners

Thai Port
First Title

== Awards ==
- MVP:
- Top Scorer:

== See also ==
- Thai Premier League
- Thai Division 1 League
- Regional League Division 2
- Kor Royal Cup
