= Thai FA Cup =

- Organiser(s): Football Association of Thailand
- Founded: 1974; 52 years ago
- Region: Thailand
- Teams: 96 (2025-26)
- Qualifier for: AFC Champions League Elite
- Domestic cup: Thailand Champions Cup
- Current champions: Buriram United (8th title)
- Most championships: Buriram United (8 titles)
- Broadcaster: AIS PLAY
- Website: FA Cup
- 2026–27 Thai FA Cup

The Thai FA Cup (Thai: ไทยเอฟเอคัพ), known officially as The Football Association of Thailand Cup, is a football cup competition in Thailand. Thai FA Cup is an annual knockout association football competition in men's domestic football. It was held between 1974 and 1999 and relaunched in 2009. Raj Vithi won the first two editions.

In 2009 it was announced that the Thai FA Cup would return to the Thai football calendar. All the teams from the Thai League 1 and Division 1 League were automatically entered and teams from the Division 2 League as well as university and schools teams could apply to enter. The qualifying round took place from 27–30 June. The first round proper will see sixteen qualifiers progress to the second round where they will each meet a Division 1 side. The sixteen TPL teams enter at the third round stage. The final will be played at National Stadium with the winning team receiving 1,000,000 Thai baht. The runners-up will receive 500,000 Thai baht.

== Competition format ==
=== Overview ===
The competition proceeds as a knockout tournament throughout, consisting of five rounds, a semi-final and then a final. There is no seeding, the fixtures in each round being determined by a random draw. Prior to the semi-finals, fixtures ending in a tie are extra time have been decided by penalty shoot-out. The first rounds are qualifiers, with the draws organised on a regional basis. The next rounds are the "proper" rounds where all clubs are in one draw.

== Qualification for subsequent competitions ==
=== AFC Champions League ===
The Thai FA Cup winners qualify for the following season's AFC Champions League. The Thai FA Cup winners enter the AFC Champions League at the group stage.

=== Thailand Champions Cup ===
The Thai FA Cup winners also qualify for the following season's single-match Thailand Champions Cup, the traditional season opener played against the previous season's Thai League 1 champions (or the Thai League runners-up if the Thai FA Cup winners also won the league – the double).

== Sponsorship ==
Period	Sponsor	Name
1992–1994	(Thailand) UCOM	UCOM FA Cup
1996–1997	(Thailand) SINGHA	Singha FA Cup
1999	(Japan) Honda	Honda FA Cup
2009–2014	(Thailand) Thaicom	Thaicom FA Cup
2015–	(Thailand) Chang	Chang FA Cup

== Winners and finalists ==
Year	Champion	Result	Runner-up	Venue
1974	Raj Vithi	1–0	Bangkok Bank	Supachalasai Stadium
1975	Raj Vithi (2)	3–0	Royal Thai Air Force	Supachalasai Stadium
1976	Rajpracha	3–2	Raj Vithi	Supachalasai Stadium
1977	Rajpracha (2)	2–1	Royal Thai Air Force	Supachalasai Stadium
1978–79	Not Played			
1980	Bangkok Bank	2–0	Rajpracha	Supachalasai Stadium
1981	Bangkok Bank (2)	0–0	Donmoon (shared title)	Supachalasai Stadium
1982	Port	1–0	Bangkok Bank	Supachalasai Stadium
1983	ThaiNamthip	1–0	Royal Thai Air Force	Royal Thai Army Stadium
1984	Rajpracha (3)	2–0	ThaiNamthip	Supachalasai Stadium
1985–92	Not Played			
1993	TOT	2–0	Osotsapa	Thupatemi Stadium
1994	UCOM Rajpracha (4)	2–1	Port	Supachalasai Stadium
1995	Not Played			
1996	Royal Thai Air Force	4–2	Rajpracha	Supachalasai Stadium
1997	Sinthana	2–0	Royal Thai Air Force	Supachalasai Stadium
1998	Bangkok Bank (3)	2–1	Osotsapa	Supachalasai Stadium
1999	Thai Farmers Bank	1–0	Rajpracha	Supachalasai Stadium
2000–08	Not Played			
2009	Thai Port (2)	1–1 (a.e.t.) (5–4 p)	BEC Tero Sasana	Supachalasai Stadium
2010	Chonburi	2–1	Muangthong United	Supachalasai Stadium
2011	Buriram PEA	1–0	Muangthong United	Supachalasai Stadium
2012	Buriram United (2)	2–1	Army United	Supachalasai Stadium
2013	Buriram United (3)	3–1	Bangkok Glass	Thammasat Stadium
2014	Bangkok Glass	1–0	Chonburi	Supachalasai Stadium
2015	Buriram United (4)	3–1	Muangthong United	Supachalasai Stadium
2016	Chainat Hornbill, Chonburi (2), Ratchaburi Mitr Phol, and Sukhothai (shared title)			
2017	Chiangrai United	4–2	Bangkok United	Supachalasai Stadium
2018	Chiangrai United (2)	3–2	Buriram United	Supachalasai Stadium
2019	Port (3)	1–0	Ratchaburi Mitr Phol	Leo Stadium
2020–21	Chiangrai United (3)	1–1 (a.e.t.) (4–3 p)	Chonburi	Thammasat Stadium
2021–22	Buriram United (5)	1–0	Nakhon Ratchasima	Thammasat Stadium
2022–23	Buriram United (6)	2–0	Bangkok United	Thammasat Stadium
2023–24	Bangkok United	1–1 (a.e.t.) (4–1 p)	Dragon Pathumwan Kanchanaburi	Dragon Solar Park
2024–25	Buriram United (7)	3–2	Muangthong United	Thammasat Stadium
2025–26	Buriram United (8)	1–0 (a.e.t.)	PT Prachuap	Thammasat Stadium
2026–27				

== Top-performing clubs ==
Club	Champions
Buriram United	8 (2011^{1}, 2012, 2013, 2015, 2021–22, 2022–23, 2024–25, 2025–26)
Rajpracha	4 (1976, 1977, 1984, 1994)
Bangkok Bank	3 (1980, 1981^{2}, 1998)
Port	3 (1982, 2009^{3}, 2019)
Chiangrai United	3 (2017, 2018, 2020–21)
Raj Vithi	2 (1974, 1975)
Chonburi	2 (2010, 2016^{2})
Donmoon	1 (1981^{2})
ThaiNamthip	1 (1983)
TOT	1 (1993)
Royal Thai Air Force	1 (1996)
Sinthana	1 (1997)
Thai Farmers Bank	1 (1999)
Bangkok Glass	1 (2014)
Chainat Hornbill	1 (2016^{2})
Ratchaburi Mitr Phol	1 (2016^{2})
Sukhothai	1 (2016^{2})
Bangkok United	1 (2023–24)

^{1} as Buriram PEA
^{2} shared title
^{3} as Thai Port

== See also ==
- Thai League Cup
- Thailand Champions Cup
- Thailand Football Records and Statistics
