= 2011 Thai FA Cup final =

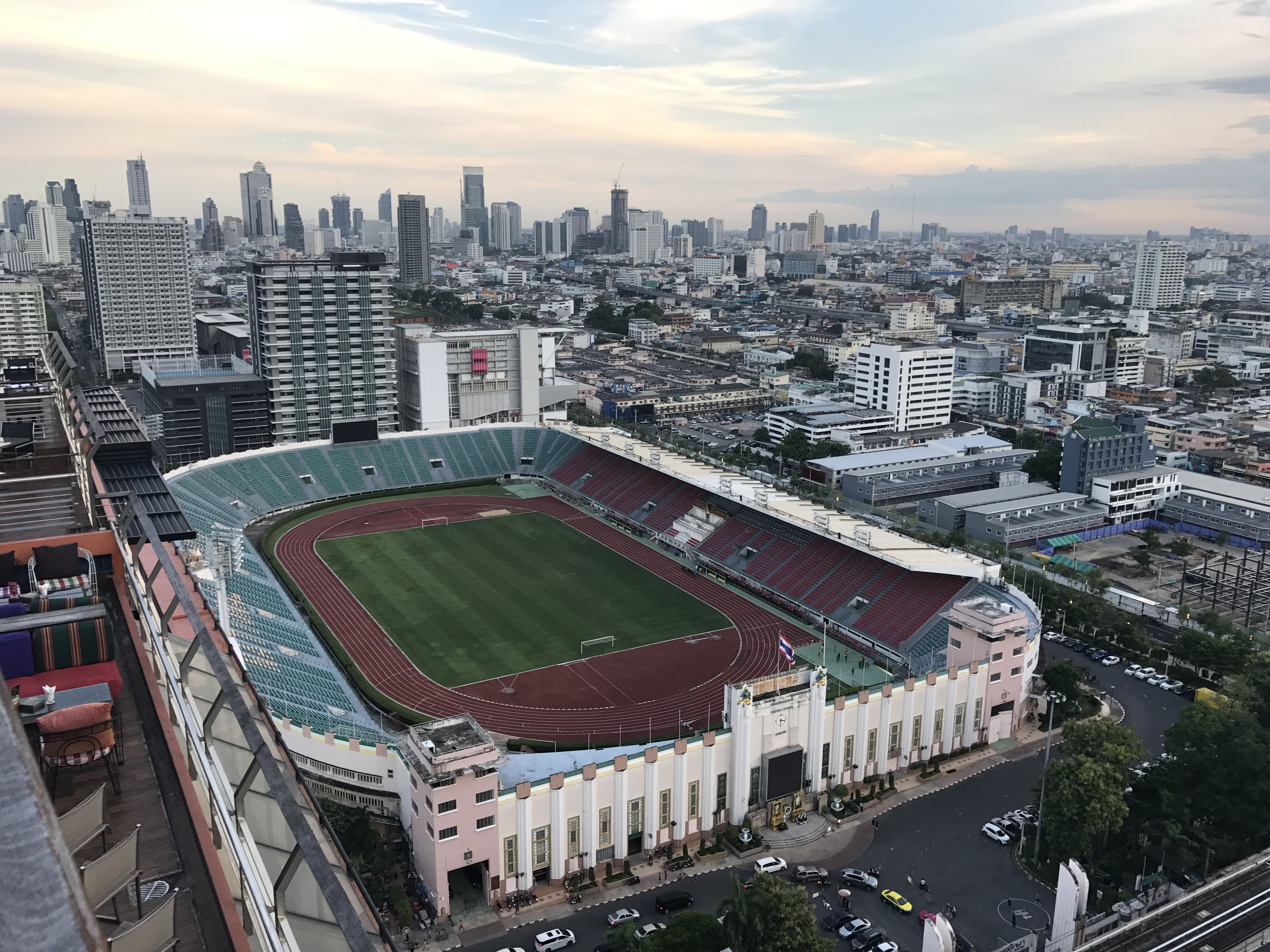
- The match took place at Supachalasai Stadium.
Muangthong United	Buriram PEA
0	1
- After Extra Time
- Date: 11 January 2012
- Venue: Suphachalasai Stadium, Bangkok
- Man of the Match: Frank Acheampong
- Referee: Prapoj Ditsomsri

The 2011 Thai FA Cup final was the 18th final of the Thailand's domestic football cup competition, the FA Cup. The final was played at Suphachalasai Stadium in Bangkok on 11 January 2012. The match was contested by Muangthong United, who beat Songkhla 6–5 (PSO.), (After Extra Time 2-2) in their semi-final, and Buriram PEA who beat Army United 2–0 in the match. The match was won by Buriram PEA, defeating Muangthong United 1–0 after extra time through a goal scored by Frank Acheampong.

== Road to the final ==
Note: In all results below, the score of the finalist is given first (H: home; A: away; TPL: Clubs from Thai Premier League; D1: Clubs from Thai Division 1 League; D2: Clubs from Regional League Division 2).

Muangthong United (TPL)		Round	Buriram PEA (TPL)	
Opponent	Result	Knockout 1 leg	Opponent	Result
Samut Prakan United (D2)	9–0 (H)	Round of 64	PTT Rayong (D1)	2–1 (a.e.t.) (H)
Bangkok Glass (TPL)	1–1 (a.e.t.) (5–4p) (H)	Round of 32	Bye	
Pattaya United (TPL)	6–0 (A)	Round of 16	Police United (TPL)	w/o (A)
Sriracha (TPL)	4–0 (H)	Quarter-finals	BEC Tero Sasana (TPL)	2–0 (H)
Songkhla (D1)	2–2 (a.e.t.) (4–3p) (N)	Semi-finals	Army United (TPL)	2–0 (N)

== Match ==
=== Details ===
11 January 2012
19:00 UTC+7

Muangthong United	0 – 1 (a.e.t.)	Buriram PEA
	Report	Acheampong 108'

Suphachalasai Stadium, Bangkok
Referee: Prapoj Ditsomsri

Muangthong United	Burriam PEA

MUANGTHONG UNITED:
GK	26	(Thailand) Kawin Thammasatchanan
DF	15	(Ivory Coast) Ali Diarra
DF	21	(Ivory Coast) Dagno Siaka	(yellow card) 32'
DF	6	(Thailand) Nattaporn Phanrit (c)	(yellow card) 85'
DF	35	(Thailand) Weerawut Kayem	(yellow card) 42',	(substituted off) 110'
MF	23	(Thailand) Piyaphon Bantao	(substituted off) 95'
MF	22	(Thailand) Naruphol Ar-Romsawa	(substituted off) 58'
MF	19	(Thailand) Pichitphong Choeichiu	(yellow card) 21'
MF	7	(Thailand) Datsakorn Thonglao	(yellow card) 103'
FW	10	(Thailand) Teerasil Dangda
FW	9	(England) Robbie Fowler
Substitutes:
MF	30	(Thailand) Adisak Klinkosoom	(substituted on) 95'
MF	16	(Thailand) Jakkraphan Pornsai	(substituted on) 58'	(yellow card) 61'
FW	17	(Thailand) Anon Sangsanoi	(substituted on) 110'
Manager:
(England) Robbie Fowler

BURIRAM PEA:
GK	1	(Thailand) Sivaruck Tedsungnoen
DF	11	(Thailand) Apichet Puttan (c)
DF	20	(Cameroon) Florent Obama	(yellow card) 12'
DF	5	(Cameroon) Yves Ekwalla Herman	(yellow card) 90+2'
DF	2	(Thailand) Theeraton Bunmathan	(yellow card) 67'
MF	17	(Cameroon) Bouba Abbo	(yellow card) 36'
MF	6	(Thailand) Jakkraphan Kaewprom
MF	8	(Thailand) Suchao Nuchnum
MF	7	(Thailand) Rangsan Viwatchaichok	(yellow card) 71'
FW	30	(Ghana) Frank Acheampong
FW	14	(Cameroon) Frank Ohandza
Substitutes:
FW	10	(Thailand) Kirati Keawsombat	(substituted on) 115'	(yellow card) 117'
Manager:
(Thailand) Attaphol Buspakom

Assistant referees:
Binla Prida
Nirut Rungsrichat
Fourth official:
Teetichai Nualjan

MATCH RULES

- 90 minutes.
- 30 minutes of extra-time if necessary.
- Penalty shootout if scores still level.
- Nine named substitutes
- Maximum of 3 substitutions.
