= Adisak Klinkosoom =

Thai footballer (born 1993)

Personal information
- Full name: Adisak Klinkosoom
- Date of birth: 18 August 1993 (age 33)
- Place of birth: Lopburi, Thailand
- Height: 1.73 m (5 ft 8 in)
- Position: Defensive midfielder

Youth career
- 2005–2009: JMG Academy
- 2009: Muangthong United

Senior career*
Years	Team	Apps	(Gls)
2010–2013	Muangthong United	4	(0)
2012	→ Thai Port (loan)	11	(0)
2013	→ Chainat Hornbill (loan)	8	(0)
2014–2016	Chainat Hornbill	32	(2)
2017	Ratchaburi Mitr Phol	0	(0)
2017	Ubon UMT United	4	(0)
2019	Chiangrai United	0	(0)
2021	Sisaket	0	(0)
2021–2022	Patong City	9	(0)
2022–2024	Trat	4	(0)

International career
2011	Thailand U19	9	(2)
2013	Thailand U23	5	(1)
- * Club domestic league appearances and goals as of 10 March 2024

Adisak Klinkosoom (Thai: อดิศักดิ์ กลิ่นโกสุมภ์, born August 18, 1993) is a Thai professional footballer who plays as a defensive midfielder for Thai League 1 club Trat.

== Honours ==
=== Club ===
Muangthong United

- Thai League 1 (2): 2010

Chiangrai United

- Thai League Cup (1): 2018
- Thai FA Cup (1): 2018
