= Narat Munin-noppamart =

Thai footballer

Personal information
- Full name: Narat Munin-noppamart
- Date of birth: 10 April 1978 (age 48)
- Place of birth: Samut Prakan, Thailand
- Height: 1.81 m (5 ft 11 in)
- Position: Centre-back

Team information
- Current team: Chamchuri United (manager)

Senior career*
Years	Team	Apps	(Gls)
2008–2010	BEC Tero Sasana		
2011–2012	Chiangrai United		
2013	Army United		

International career
2006	Thailand	1	(0)

Managerial career
- 2019–: Chamchuri United
- * Club domestic league appearances and goals as of 23 June 2008

Narat Munin-noppamart (Thai: ณรัฐ มุนินทร์นพมาศ) is a Thai retired footballer who played as a centre-back and is the manager of Thai League 3 club Chamchuri United. He has made an appearance for the Thailand national football team for 1 game in 2006.
