= Tassana Cheamsa-art =

Thai footballer (born 1982)

Thasana Chamsa-ad
Personal information
- Full name: Thasana Chamsa-ad
- Date of birth: 21 November 1982 (age 43)
- Place of birth: Ratchaburi, Thailand
- Height: 1.86 m (6 ft 1 in)
- Position: Defender

Senior career*
Years	Team	Apps	(Gls)
2008–2011	BEC Tero Sasana	34	(2)
2012	TTM Chiangmai	16	(0)
2013–2014	Bangkok Glass	1	(0)
2014	→ Air Force Central (loan)	6	(0)
2015	Saraburi	18	(0)
Total		75	(2)
- * Club domestic league appearances and goals as of 23 June 2008

Thasana Chamsa-ad (Thai: ทัศนา แช่มสะอาด, born November 21, 1982) is a former professional footballer from Thailand.
