= Mário César =

Brazilian footballer

Personal information
- Full name: Mário César Da Silva
- Date of birth: August 20, 1977 (age 49)
- Place of birth: Brazil
- Height: 1.80 m (5 ft 11 in)
- Position: Defender

Senior career*
Years	Team	Apps	(Gls)
2000–2004	Sport Recife		
2004–2005	Santa Cruz		
2005–2006	Sriwijaya		
2006–2009	Penang FA		
2009–2012	Thai Port	47	(1)
2013–2014	Bangkok United		
2014–2015	Rayong		
2016	Air Force Central		
- * Club domestic league appearances and goals

Mário César da Silva (1977) is a retired Brazilian football (soccer) player. He played in the 2010 Thai League Cup final and won a winner's medal after Thai Port defeated Buriram PEA F.C. 2–1. He was voted Thai Port's 2010 foreign player of the year.
