= Umpai Mutaporn =

Thai footballer (born 1985)

Personal information
- Full name: Umpai Mutaporn
- Date of birth: 16 January 1985 (age 41)
- Place of birth: Nong Khai, Thailand
- Height: 1.65 m (5 ft 5 in)
- Position: Defensive midfielder

Youth career
- 2006–2008: Chonburi

Senior career*
Years	Team	Apps	(Gls)
2009–2013	Sriracha	39	(3)
2014	Singhtarua	13	(0)
2015	Prachuap	16	(1)
2016	PTT Rayong	6	(0)
2016	Ayutthaya	4	(0)
2017	Sisaket	16	(0)
2018	Trat	9	(0)
2019	Phuket City		
2020	Uthai Thani		
- * Club domestic league appearances and goals as of 14 November 2008

Umpai Mutaporn (Thai: อำไพ มุธาพร, born 16 January 1985) is a Thai professional footballer.

== Honours ==
=== Club ===
Sriracha

- Thai Division 1 League Champions (1) : 2010
