= 2018 Thai FA Cup final =

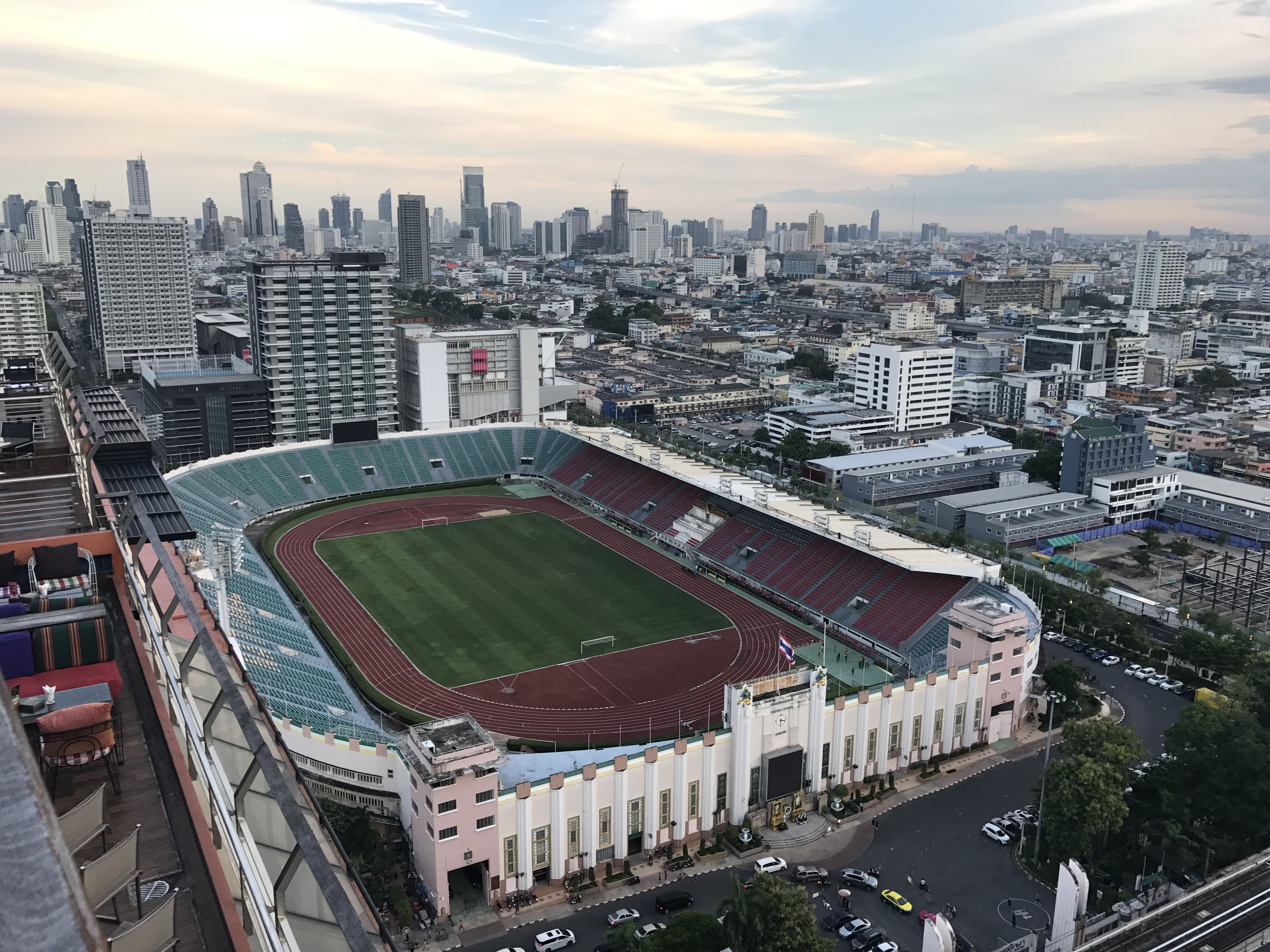
- The match took place at Supachalasai Stadium.
- Event: 2018 Thai FA Cup
Chiangrai United	Buriram United
3	2
- Date: 27 October 2018
- Venue: Supachalasai Stadium, Bangkok
- Man of the Match: Bill
- Referee: Torpong Somsing (Thailand)
- Attendance: 17,540
- Weather: Partly cloudy 31 °C (88 °F) humidity 72%

The 2018 Thai FA Cup final was the final match of the 2018 Thai FA Cup, the 25th season of a Thailand's football tournament organised by Football Association of Thailand. It was played at the Supachalasai Stadium in Bangkok, Thailand on 27 October 2018, between Chiangrai United a big team from the Northern part and Buriram United a big team from the Northeastern part of Thailand.

== Road to the final ==
Chiangrai United (T1)		Round	Buriram United (T1)	
Opponent	Result	Knockout 1 leg	Opponent	Result
Nakhon Ratchasima Mazda (T1)	1–0 (A)	Round of 64	Bangkok United (T1)	0–0 (a.e.t.) (8–7p) (H)
Air Force Central (T1)	2–0 (H)	Round of 32	Lampang (T2)	6–0 (H)
SCG Muangthong United (T1)	0–0 (a.e.t.) (5–4p) (H)	Round of 16	Nakhon Pathom United (T4)	2–1 (a.e.t.) (A)
Nara United (T3)	5–0 (A)	Quarter-finals	Port (T1)	3–1 (A)
Ratchaburi Mitr Phol (T1)	3–1 (a.e.t.) (N)	Semi-finals	Sisaket (T2)	2–1 (N)

Note: In all results below, the score of the finalist is given first (H: home; A: away; T1: Clubs from Thai League; T2: Clubs from Thai League 2; T3: Clubs from Thai League 3; T4: Clubs from Thai League 4.

== Match ==
=== Details ===
27 October 2018
19:00 UTC+7

Chiangrai United	3–2	Buriram United
Bill 2', 44' (pen.), 72'	Report; Highlight	Osvaldo 25'; Diogo 52' (pen.)

Supachalasai Stadium, Bangkok
Attendance: 17,540
Referee: Torpong Somsing (Thailand)

Chiangrai United	Buriram United

Lineups:
GK	1	(Thailand) Chatchai Budprom
DF	4	(Thailand) Piyaphon Phanichakul
DF	5	(Brazil) Victor Cardozo (c)
DF	30	(Thailand) Suriya Singmui			(substituted off) 66'
DF	33	(Thailand) Sarawut Inpaen
DF	36	(Thailand) Shinnaphat Leeaoh		(yellow card) 21'
MF	6	(Thailand) Phitiwat Sukjitthammakul		(yellow card) 45+2'
MF	8	(South Korea) Lee Yong-rae		(yellow card) 18'
MF	18	(Thailand) Chaiyawat Buran		(yellow card) 75'	(substituted off) 85'
FW	9	(Brazil) Bill	2', 43' (pen.), 72'
FW	11	(Brazil) William Henrique
Substitutes:
GK	20	(Thailand) Wanlop Saechio		(yellow card) 9'
GK	28	(Thailand) Saranon Anuin
DF	3	(Thailand) Tanasak Srisai		(yellow card) 89'	(substituted on) 85'
DF	34	(Thailand) Warawut Motim
MF	10	(Thailand) Siwakorn Tiatrakul			(substituted on) 66'
MF	14	(Thailand) Chonlawit Kanuengkid
MF	27	(Thailand) Apisorn Phumchat
MF	45	(Thailand) Adisak Klinkosoom
FW	16	(Thailand) Akarawin Sawasdee
Head Coach:
(Brazil) Alexandre Gama

Lineups:
GK	1	(Thailand) Siwarak Tedsungnoen (c)
DF	3	(Thailand) Pansa Hemviboon
DF	5	(Venezuela) Andrés Túñez
DF	11	(Thailand) Korrakot Wiriyaudomsiri
DF	14	(Thailand) Chitipat Tanklang			(substituted off) 74'
MF	6	(Thailand) Sasalak Haiprakhon		(yellow card) 74' (yellow-red card) 88'
MF	26	(Thailand) Ratthanakorn Maikami
MF	9	(Thailand) Supachai Chaided		(yellow card) 47'
FW	17	(Brazil) Osvaldo	25'
FW	20	(Philippines) Javier Patiño			(substituted off) 83'
FW	40	(Brazil) Diogo	52' (pen.)
Substitutes:
GK	29	(Thailand) Yotsapon Teangdar
DF	18	(Thailand) Apiwat Ngaolamhin
DF	60	(Thailand) Khiron Oonchaiyaphum
MF	8	(Thailand) Suchao Nuchnum			(substituted on) 74'
MF	27	(Thailand) Siwarut Pholhirun
MF	31	(Thailand) Anuwat Noicheunphan			(substituted on) 83'
Head Coach:
(Montenegro) Božidar Bandović

Assistant referees:
(Thailand) Phattarapong Kijsathit
(Thailand) Rawut Nakharit
Fourth official:
(Thailand) Songkran Bunmeekiat
Match Commissioner:
(Thailand) Pakasit Suwannanon
Referee Assessor:
(Thailand) Mongkol Rungklai

MATCH RULES

- 90 minutes.
- 30 minutes extra-time if necessary.
- Penalty shoot-out if still necessary.
- Maximum of three substitutions.

== Winner ==
2018 Thai FA Cup
Winners
Chiangrai United
Second Title

=== Prizes for winner ===
- A champion trophy.
- 5,000,000 THB prize money.
- Qualification to 2019 AFC Champions League Preliminary round 2.
- Qualification to 2019 Thailand Champions Cup.

=== Prizes for runners-up ===
- 1,000,000 THB prize money.

== See also ==
- 2018 Thai League
- 2018 Thai League 2
- 2018 Thai League 3
- 2018 Thai League 4
- 2018 Thai FA Cup
- 2018 Thai League Cup
