= 2023 Thai FA Cup final =

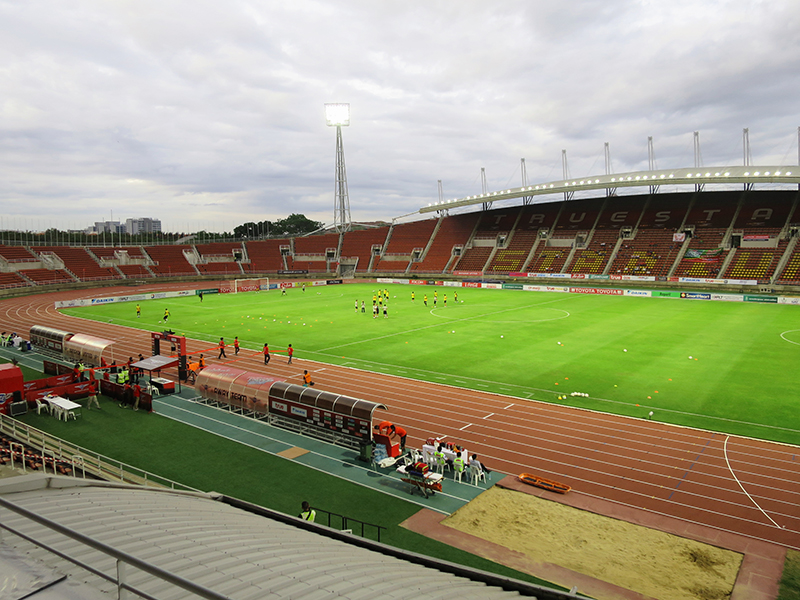
- The match took place at Thammasat Stadium.
- Event: 2022–23 Thai FA Cup
Bangkok United	Buriram United
0	2
- Date: 28 May 2023
- Venue: Thammasat Stadium, Khlong Luang, Pathum Thani
- Man of the Match: Supachai Chaided (Buriram United)
- Referee: Wiwat Jumpaoon (Thailand)
- Attendance: 14,091
- Weather: Mostly cloudy 31 °C (88 °F) humidity 65%

The 2023 Thai FA Cup final was the final match of the 2022–23 Thai FA Cup, the 29th season of a Thailand's football tournament organized by Football Association of Thailand. It was played at the Thammasat Stadium in Pathum Thani, Thailand on 28 May 2023, between Bangkok United a big team from Pathum Thani that located in the Bangkok Metropolitan Region and Buriram United a big team from Buriram that located in the Northeastern part of Thailand.

== Route to the final ==
Bangkok United (T1)			Round	Buriram United (T1)		
Opponent	Result		Knockout 1 leg	Opponent	Result	
Chiangmai (T2)	3–1 (A)	Highlight	Round of 64	Samut Prakan City (T2)	5–1 (H)	Highlight
Chainat Hornbill (T2)	4–1 (A)		Round of 32	Nakhon Pathom United (T2)	2–0 (H)	Highlight
Phitsanulok (T3)	2–1 (a.e.t.) (A)	Highlight	Round of 16	Uthai Thani (T2)	2–1 (a.e.t.) (A)	Highlight
Nakhon Ratchasima Mazda (T1)	1–0 (H)	Highlight	Quarter-finals	Phrae United (T2)	5–2 (H)	Highlight
Police Tero (T1)	4–0 (N)	Highlight	Semi-finals	Port (T1)	2–0 (N)	Highlight

Note: In all results below, the score of the finalist is given first (H: home; A: away; T1: Clubs from Thai League 1; T2: Clubs from Thai League 2; T3: Clubs from Thai League 3.

== Match ==
=== Details ===
28 May 2023
18:00 UTC+7

Bangkok United	0–2	Buriram United
	Report; Highlight; Full match Ceremony	Jonathan Bolingi 18', 45+3'

Thammasat Stadium,
Khlong Luang, Pathum Thani
Attendance: 14,091
Referee: Wiwat Jumpaoon (Thailand)

Bangkok United	Buriram United

Lineups:
GK	1	(Philippines) Michael Falkesgaard
RB	13	(Thailand) Nitipong Selanon	(yellow card) 3'
CB	4	(Thailand) Manuel Bihr
CB	3	(Brazil) Everton (c)
LB	2	(Thailand) Peerapat Notchaiya	(yellow card) 82'	(substituted off) 87'
DM	28	(Thailand) Thossawat Limwannasathian		(substituted off) 87'
DM	39	(Thailand) Pokklaw Anan		(substituted off) 65'
RM	93	(Palestine) Mahmoud Eid
AM	18	(Thailand) Thitiphan Puangchan	(yellow card) 90+1'
LM	90	(Brazil) Vander		(substituted off) 78'
CF	29	(Brazil) Willen
Substitutes:
GK	34	(Thailand) Warut Mekmusik
DF	5	(Thailand) Putthinan Wannasri
DF	24	(Thailand) Wanchai Jarunongkran		(substituted on) 87'
DF	26	(Thailand) Suphan Thongsong
MF	8	(Thailand) Wisarut Imura
MF	11	(Thailand) Rungrath Poomchantuek		(substituted on) 78'
MF	17	(Thailand) Tassanapong Muaddarak		(substituted on) 87'
MF	30	(Thailand) Ratchanat Arunyapairot
FW	36	(Thailand) Chayawat Srinawong	(yellow card) 90+1'	(substituted on) 65'
Head Coach:
(Thailand) Totchtawan Sripan

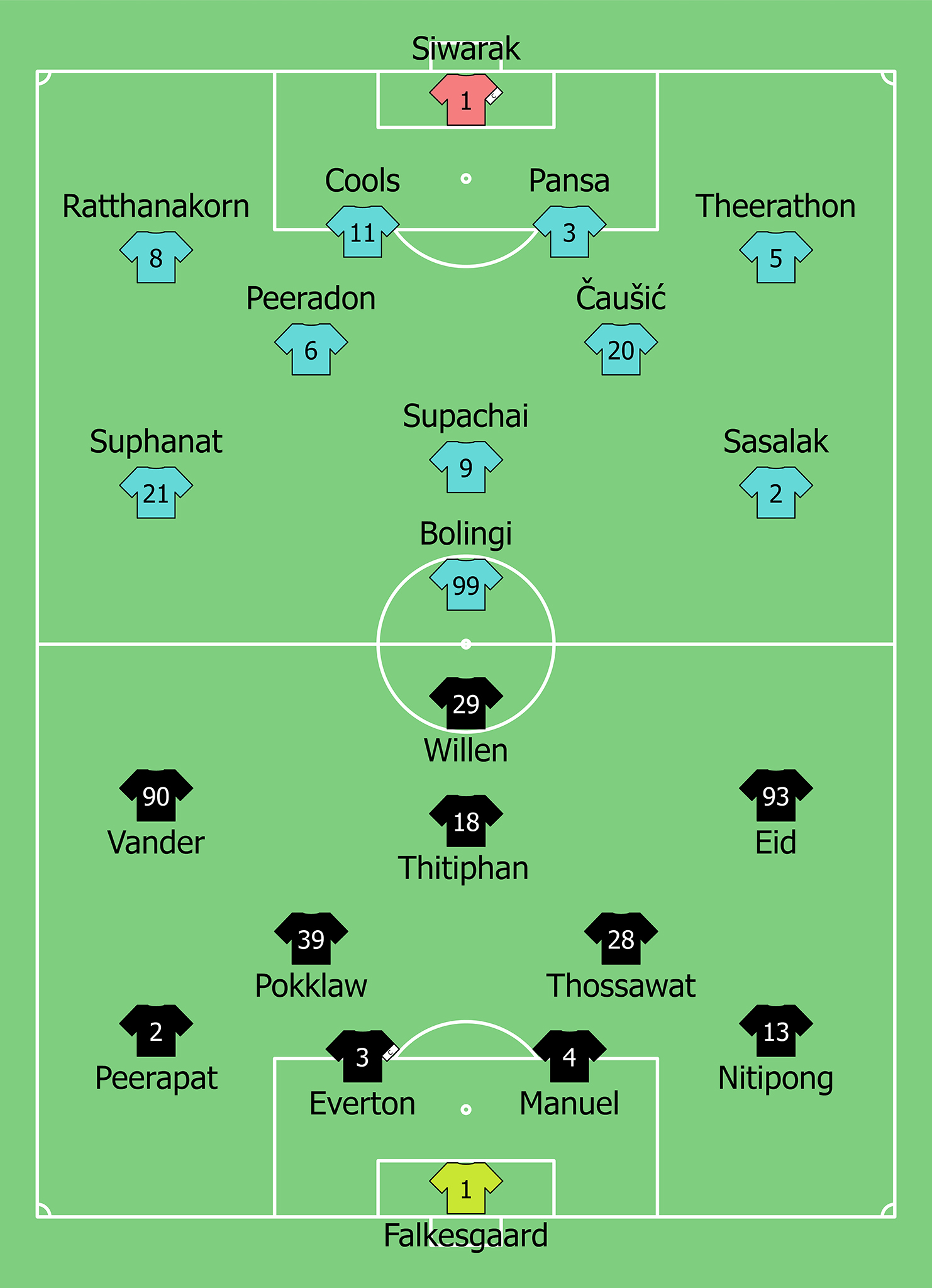

Lineups:
GK	1	(Thailand) Siwarak Tedsungnoen (c)
RB	8	(Thailand) Ratthanakorn Maikami			(substituted off) 84'
CB	11	(Malaysia) Dion Cools
CB	3	(Thailand) Pansa Hemviboon		(yellow card) 75'
LB	5	(Thailand) Theerathon Bunmathan		(yellow card) 90+1'
DM	6	(Thailand) Peeradon Chamratsamee		(yellow card) 68'
DM	20	(Serbia) Goran Čaušić		(yellow card) 2'
RM	21	(Thailand) Suphanat Mueanta			(substituted off) 74'
AM	9	(Thailand) Supachai Chaided
LM	2	(Thailand) Sasalak Haiprakhon
CF	99	(Democratic Republic of the Congo) Jonathan Bolingi	18', 45+3'	(red card) 90+2'
Substitutes:
GK	59	(Thailand) Nopphon Lakhonphon
DF	14	(Thailand) Chitipat Tanklang
DF	15	(Thailand) Narubadin Weerawatnodom			(substituted on) 84'
DF	92	(Thailand) Thawatchai Inprakhon
MF	62	(Thailand) Airfan Doloh
MF	95	(Thailand) Seksan Ratree
FW	26	(Guinea) Lonsana Doumbouya			(substituted on) 74'
FW	29	(Thailand) Arthit Boodjinda
FW	58	(Thailand) Pattara Soimalai
Head Coach:
(Japan) Masatada Ishii

Assistant referees:
(Thailand) Tanate Chuchuen
(Thailand) Chotrawee Tongduang
Fourth official:
(Thailand) Natee Choosuwan
Assistant VAR:
(Thailand) Akom Charoensuk
(Thailand) Rawut Nakarit
Match Commissioner:
(Thailand) Danai Mongkolsiri
Referee Assessor:
(Thailand) Praew Semaksuk
General Coordinator:
(Thailand) Nuttapon Phaopanus

MATCH RULES

- 90 minutes.
- 30 minutes extra-time if necessary.
- Penalty shoot-out if still necessary.
- Maximum of 5 substitutions.

=== Statistics ===
First half
Statistic	Bangkok United	Buriram United
Goals scored	0	2
Total shots	2	2
Shots on target	1	2
Saves	0	1
Ball possession	56%	44%
Total passes	205	146
Corner kicks	1	1
Fouls committed	10	10
Offsides	0	1
Yellow cards	1	1
Red cards	0	0

Second half
Statistic	Bangkok United	Buriram United
Goals scored	0	0
Total shots	6	1
Shots on target	1	0
Saves	0	1
Ball possession	72%	28%
Total passes	279	92
Corner kicks	2	1
Fouls committed	9	8
Offsides	3	1
Yellow cards	3	3
Red cards	0	1

Overall
Statistic	Bangkok United	Buriram United
Goals scored	0	2
Total shots	8	3
Shots on target	2	2
Saves	0	2
Ball possession	64%	36%
Total passes	484	238
Corner kicks	3	2
Fouls committed	19	18
Offsides	3	2
Yellow cards	4	4
Red cards	0	1

== Winner ==
2022–23 Thai FA Cup
Winners
Buriram United
Sixth Title

=== Prizes for winner ===
- A champion trophy.
- 5,000,000 THB prize money.
- Qualification to 2023–24 AFC Champions League Play-offs.
- Qualification to 2023 Thailand Champions Cup.

=== Prizes for runners-up ===
- 1,000,000 THB prize money.

== See also ==
- 2022–23 Thai League 1
- 2022–23 Thai League 2
- 2022–23 Thai League 3
- 2022–23 Thai FA Cup
- 2022–23 Thai League Cup
- 2022 Thailand Champions Cup
