= Edvaldo (footballer, born 1974) =

Brazilian footballer

Personal information
- Full name: Edvaldo Gonçalves Pereira
- Date of birth: May 15, 1974 (age 52)
- Place of birth: São João de Meriti, Brazil
- Height: 1.90 m (6 ft 3 in)
- Position: Striker

Team information
- Current team: Phang Nga FC

Senior career*
Years	Team	Apps	(Gls)
2009	Thai Port	16	(4)
2010–2011	Chiangrai United	16	(8)
2012	Phang Nga FC		
- * Club domestic league appearances and goals

Edvaldo Goncalves Pereira, more commonly known as Edvaldo, is a Brazilian football (soccer) player, currently playing for Chiangrai United in the Thai Division 1 League. During his career he has played for Botafogo-SP (Brazil), Maritimo and Farense (Portugal), Toluca (Mexico), St-Gallen (Switzerland), Shanghai Shenhua (China) and Defensor Sporting (Uruguay).
