= Teerawut Sanphan =

Thai footballer (born 1979)

Personal information
- Date of birth: 29 July 1979 (age 47)
- Place of birth: Chaiyaphum, Thailand
- Height: 1.67 m (5 ft 5 1/2 in)
- Position: Attacking midfielder

Senior career*
Years	Team	Apps	(Gls)
2009–2013	Singhtarua		
2014	Thailand Tobacco Monopoly		
2015	Nonthaburi		
2015–2016	Kasetsart		
2017	Bangkok Christian College		
- * Club domestic league appearances and goals

Teerawut Sanphan (Thai: ธีระวุฒิ สันพันธ์; born July 29, 1979) is a Thai former footballer.
