= Moudourou Moise =

Cameroonian footballer

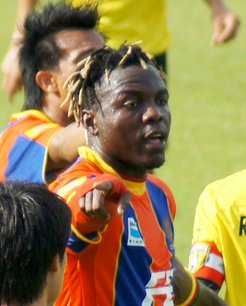

Personal information
- Full name: Moudourou Swa Moise
- Date of birth: 15 September 1985 (age 41)
- Place of birth: Douala, Cameroon
- Position: Defender

Team information
- Current team: Phuket F.C.
- Number: 36

Youth career
- 2003–2005: Abadu Rangers Fundong

Senior career*
Years	Team	Apps	(Gls)
2005–2006	Paya Lebar Punggol FC	10	(0)
2006–2008	Young Lions	20	(0)
2008–2009	Johor FC	11	(0)
2009–2010	Thai Port FC	58	(4)
2010–2012 (leg1)	Suphanburi F.C.		
2012 (leg2)	Chainat F.C.		
2013	Phuket F.C.	2	(0)
- * Club domestic league appearances and goals

Moudourou Swa-Moise (born 15 September 1985 in Douala) is a Cameroonian professional footballer. He currently plays for Thailand Premier League side Thai Port FC. as a commanding, physical centre back.

== Playing career ==
He picked up his first Thai winner's medal with Port as part of their 2009 Thai FA Cup championship squad, scoring during the decisive penalty shootout and earning a runner's-up award in the 2009 Thai Port player awards. In 2010 more success followed, with Port beating Buriram PEA F.C. for the 2010 Thai League Cup championship as well as the subsequent international 2011 Toyota Premier Cup against Shonan Bellmare.
