= 2009 S.League =

S. League
- Season: 2009
- Champions: Singapore Armed Forces; 8th S.League title
- AFC Champions League: Singapore Armed Forces (S.League winners)
- AFC Cup: Geylang United (Singapore Cup winners)
- Matches: 165
- Goals: 452 (2.74 per match)
- Top goalscorer: Aleksandar Đurić (28)
- Biggest home win: Singapore Armed Forces 6-0 Albirex Niigata (S) (26 March 2009)
- Biggest away win: Sengkang Punggol 1-7 Singapore Armed Forces (11 April 2009)
- Highest scoring: Sengkang Punggol 1-7 Singapore Armed Forces (11 April 2009)
- Longest winning run: 7

The 2009 S.League (officially known as the Great-Eastern-Yeo's S.League for sponsorship reasons) was the 14th season since the establishment of the S.League. Singapore Armed Forces FC won their eighth S.League title.

Changes to the league include:

- Monthly claim of S$2,000 for the local clubs from the FAS if they sign a foreign player who is a newcomer to the S-League.
- DPMM FC have replaced Dalian Shide Siwu in 2009 season.

== Teams ==
Location of teams in 2009 S.League
Location of teams in 2009 S.League (Singapore teams)

== Foreign players ==
Each club is allowed to have up to a maximum of 4 foreign players.

Club	Player 1	Player 2	Player 3	Player 4	Prime League	Former Player
Balestier Khalsa	(South Korea) Jun Jin	(South Korea) Oh In-kyun	(South Korea) Oh Ddog-yi	(Chile) Julio Eduardo	(Australia) Jamie Pitt	(Australia) Bryan Soane (Brazil) Itamar Rangel | (American Samoa) Seth Galloway
(Brunei) DPMM FC	(Algeria) Hamid Berguiga	(Croatia) Ivan Jerković	(Croatia) Rene Komar	None	None	(South Korea) Oh Ddog-Yi
Geylang International	(Japan) Haruki Seto	(South Korea) Kim Jae-hong	(Slovakia) Rastislav Beličák	(Slovakia) Miroslav Latiak	None	(Canada) Rickey Harris | (England) Lloyd Butler
Gombak United	(Australia) Goran Subara	(Thailand) Theerawekin Seehawong	(Nigeria) Gabriel Obatola	(Nigeria) Kingsley Njoku	None	(Nigeria) Emmanuel Emuejeraye | (Nigeria) Odion Obadin
Home United	(Japan) Norikazu Murakami	(Brazil) Peres De Oliveira	(Cameroon) Kengne Ludovick	(Cameroon) Valery Hiek	(Thailand) Naruphol Ar-romsawa	None
Sengkang Punggol	(Japan) Hiroyuki Yamamoto	(Canada) Anthony Bahadur	(Canada) Murphy Wiredu	(Guinea) Abdoulaye Diallo	(Guinea) Mamadou M. Diallo	None
SAFFC	(Japan) Kenji Arai	(Japan) Masahiro Fukasawa	(South Korea) Park Tae-won	(Thailand) Therdsak Chaiman	(England) Lloyd Butler	None
Tampines Rovers	(Japan) Seiji Kaneko	(Japan) Akihiro Nakamura	(France) Benoit Croissant	(Thailand) Sutee Suksomkit	(Thailand) Wichaya Dechmitr	None
Woodlands	(Iran) Mojtaba Tehranizadeh	(Chile) Luis Eduardo Hicks	(England) Daniel Hammond	(Egypt) Zakaria Yousif	None	None
(Singapore) Young Lions	(China) Yang Mu	(Nigeria) Obadin Aikhena	None	None	None	None

- Albirex Niigata (S) and Super Reds are not allowed to hire any foreigners.

== League table ==
Pos	Team	Pld	W	D	L	GF	GA	GD	Pts	Qualification
1	Singapore Armed Forces (C)	30	22	1	7	73	31	+42	67	Qualification to AFC Champions League Qualifying Play-off or AFC Cup Group Stage
2	Tampines Rovers	30	16	8	6	47	25	+22	56	
3	Gombak United	30	14	11	5	52	32	+20	53	
4	Home United	30	16	5	9	50	32	+18	53	
5	(South Korea) Super Reds (Note: The three foreign clubs – Albirex Niigata (S), DPMM FC and Super Reds – as well as the Football Association of Singapore (FAS) under-23 team, Young Lions, were not eligible for qualification to continental competitions.)	30	14	8	8	52	34	+18	50	
6	Geylang United	30	12	4	14	36	39	−3	40	Qualification to AFC Cup Group Stage (Note: Geylang United qualified for the 2010 AFC Cup as 2009 Singapore Cup winners.)
7	(Japan) Albirex Niigata (S)	30	11	5	14	38	47	−9	38	
8	(Singapore) Young Lions	30	9	7	14	33	48	−15	34	
9	Woodlands Wellington	30	8	7	15	23	48	−25	31	
10	Sengkang Punggol	30	5	6	19	26	58	−32	21	
11	Balestier Khalsa	30	4	6	20	22	58	−36	18	
12	(Brunei) DPMM FC (D, R)	0	0	0	0	0	0	0	0	Expelled from league after FIFA ruling; results expunged (Note: Following a FIFA decision on 29 September 2009, Brunei DPMM would no longer be permitted to play in the S.League. They were unable to complete the league after FIFA denied an appeal from the FAS for Brunei DPMM to finish the 2009 season. Their results were expunged.)

Source: RSSSF
Rules for classification: 1) points; 2) goal difference; 3) number of goals scored; 4) head-to-head
(C) Champions; (D) Disqualified; (R) Relegated

== Results ==
Fixtures and Results of the S. League 2009 season.

Note: The results are broken down into weeks rather than rounds, as some teams may play 2 or more games a week due to the nature of the league system (games are played every day). Hence, sometimes, teams may not play in the league some weeks due to other competition commitments or re-arranged games.

=== Week 1 ===
The opening week of the season runs from Monday 16 February to Sunday 22 February.

16 February 2009
19:45

Tampines Rovers	0 – 0	Home United
	Details; Report

Tampines Stadium
Attendance: 3,337
Referee: Abdul Malik Bashir

17 February 2009
19:45

Geylang United	3 – 1	Albirex Niigata (S)
Ashrin Shariff 41' (pen.) 85'; Noor Ali 45'	Details; Report	Kenji Adachihara 32'

Bedok Stadium
Attendance: 2,521
Referee: Sukhbir Singh

19 February 2009
19:45

Super Reds	0 – 0	Young Lions
	Details; Report

Yishun Stadium
Attendance: 2,464
Referee: Abas Daud

20 February 2009
19:30

Sengkang Punggol	0 – 1	Gombak United
	Details; Report	Gabriel Obatola 61'

Jalan Besar Stadium
Attendance: 4,230
Referee: P Pandian

22 February 2009
19:45

Balestier Khalsa	0 – 3	SAFFC
	Details; Report	Aleksandar Duric 36' 39' (pen.); Masahiro Fukasawa 75'

Toa Payoh Stadium
Attendance: 1,992
Referee: Leow Thiam Hoe

=== Week 2 ===
The 2nd week of the season runs from Monday 23 February to Sunday 1 March.

23 February 2009
19:45

Albirex Niigata (S)	0 – 1	Sengkang Punggol
	Details; Report	Indra Sahdan 36'

Jurong East Stadium
Attendance: 1,642
Referee: Muhd Taqi

24 February 2009
19:45

Gombak United	1 – 0	Super Reds
Agu Casmir 87'	Details; Report

Jurong West Stadium
Attendance: 2,157
Referee: T Aravinthan

26 February 2009
19:45

Woodlands Wellington	2 – 2	Tampines Rovers
Zakaria Yousif 14'; Mojtaba Tehranizadeh 50'	Details; Report	Sutee Suksomkit 28' 43'

Woodlands Stadium
Attendance: 1,955
Referee: Muhd Adzhar Adziz

26 February 2009
19:45

Home United	3 – 0	Balestier Khalsa
Kengne Ludovick 61' 90' (pen.); Peres de Oliveira 76'	Details; Report

Clementi Stadium
Attendance: 1,783
Referee: Zaid Hussein

27 February 2009
19:30

Young Lions	1 – 1	Brunei DPMM
Khairul Nizam 44'	Details; Report	Abu Bakar Mahari 90'

Jalan Besar Stadium
Attendance: 3,000
Referee: Abdul Malik Bashir

28 February 2009
19:45

SAFFC	2 – 0	Geylang United
John Wilkinson 24'; Aleksandar Duric 26'	Details; Report

Choa Chu Kang Stadium
Attendance: 2,213
Referee: Abas Daud

=== Week 3 ===
The 3rd week of the season runs from Monday 2 March to Sunday 8 March.

2 March 2009
19:45

Balestier Khalsa	1 – 1	Tampines Rovers
Ithamar Rangel 69'	Details; Report	Seiji Kaneko 54'

Toa Payoh Stadium
Attendance: 2,044
Referee: Sukhbir Singh

3 March 2009
19:45

Woodlands Wellington	0 – 0	Young Lions
	Details; Report

Woodlands Stadium
Attendance: 2,076
Referee: Muhd Taqi

4 March 2009
19:45

SAFFC	3 – 1	Home United
Ahmad Latiff 39'; Daniel Bennett 61'; John Wilkinson 90'	Details; Report	Shi Jiayi 50' (pen.)

Choa Chu Kang Stadium
Attendance: 3,242
Referee: P Pandian

4 March 2009
20:45

Brunei DPMM	2 – 1	Super Reds
Yusof Salleh 61'; Abu Bakar Mahari 84'	Details; Report	Jeon Byung Euk 11' (pen.)

Hassanal Bolkiah National Stadium
Attendance: 5,457
Referee: Abas Daud

5 March 2009
19:45

Sengkang Punggol	2 – 2	Geylang United
Indra Sahdan 70' (pen.) 88'	Details; Report	Yasir Hanapi 3'; Ashrin Shariff 38'

Hougang Stadium
Attendance: 2,083
Referee: Abdul Malik Bashir

6 March 2009
19:30

Gombak United	3 – 0	Albirex Niigata (S)
Gabriel Obatola 23' (pen.) 72'; Ruhaizad Ismail 80'	Detail; Report

Jalan Besar Stadium
Attendance: 3,117
Referee: Muhd Adzhar Adziz

8 March 2009
20:45

Brunei DPMM	2 – 1	Woodlands Wellington
Sairol Sahari 8'; Ivan Jerkovic 85' (pen.)	Details; Report	Ismadi Bin Muhamad Mukhtar 4'

Hassanal Bolkiah National Stadium
Attendance: 6,451
Referee: Leow Thiam Hoe

=== Week 4 ===
The 4th week of the season runs from Monday 9 March to Sunday 15 March.

9 March 2009
19:45

Tampines Rovers	2 – 0	Sengkang Punggol
Noh Alam Shah 22'; Sutee Suksomkit 82' (pen.)	Details; Report

Tampines Stadium
Attendance: 2,510
Referee: Zaid Hussein

11 March 2009
19:45

Super Reds	1 – 1	Balestier Khalsa
Yu Hyun Koo 58'	Details; Report	Bryan Soane 90'

Yishun Stadium
Attendance: 2,194
Referee: Muhd Taqi

12 March 2009
19:45

Geylang United	0 – 0	Brunei DPMM
	Details; Report

Bedok Stadium
Attendance: 2,595
Referee: Sukhbir Singh

12 March 2009
19:45

Albirex Niigata (S)	3 – 0	Woodlands Wellington
Akira Takase 8' 14'; Kenji Adachihara 69'	Details; Report

Jurong East Stadium
Attendance: 1,518
Referee: P Pandian

13 March 2009
19:30

Home United	1 – 1	Gombak United
Valery Hiek 54'	Details; Report	Goran Šubara 82'

Jalan Besar Stadium
Attendance: 3,664
Referee: Abas Daud

14 March 2009
19:45

Young Lions	1 – 2	SAFFC
Obadin Aikhena 67'	Details; Report	John Wilkinson 3'; Shaiful Esah 72'

Jalan Besar Stadium
Attendance: 1,455
Referee: Abdul Malik Bashir

=== Week 5 ===
The 5th week of the season runs from Monday 16 March to Sunday 22 March.

16 March 2009
19:45

Sengkang Punggol	2 – 3	Super Reds
Murphy Wiredu 22' 38'	Details; Report	Kim Yoon-Sik 5'; Park Han Seok 7' 29'

Hougang Stadium
Attendance: 2,030
Referee: T Aravinthan

19 March 2009
19:45

Gombak United	1 – 0	Young Lions
Kingsley Njoku 90'	Details; Report

Jurong West Stadium
Attendance: 2,606
Referee: Zaid Hussein

19 March 2009
19:45

Balestier Khalsa	0 – 1	Brunei DPMM
	Details; Report	Oh Ddog Yi 35'

Toa Payoh Stadium
Attendance: 1,957
Referee: Muhd Adzhar Adziz

20 March 2009
19:45

Geylang United	0 – 2	Tampines Rovers
	Details; Report	Qiu Li 37'; Noh Alam Shah 68'

Jalan Besar Stadium
Attendance: 4,012
Referee: Muhd Taqi

21 March 2009
19:45

Albirex Niigata (S)	1 – 0	Home United
Ryota Kobayashi 5'	Details; Report

Jurong East Stadium
Attendance: 1,532
Referee: Leow Thiam Hoe

22 March 2009
19:45

SAFFC	2 – 3	Woodlands Wellington
Park Tae-Won 20'; John Wilkinson 34'	Details; Report	Jamil Ali 49' 79'; Mojtaba Tehranizadeh 70'

Choa Chu Kang Stadium
Attendance: 2,248
Referee: Abas Daud

=== Week 6 ===
The 6th week of the season runs from Monday 23 March to Sunday 29 March.

23 March 2009
19:45

Balestier Khalsa	2 – 1	Geylang United
Ithamar Rangel 64'; Syaqir Sulaiman 72'	Details; Report	Rastislav Belicak 23'

Toa Payoh Stadium
Attendance: 1,905
Referee: Zaid Hussein

24 March 2009
19:45

Brunei DPMM	1 – 0	Sengkang Punggol
Shahrazen Said 60'	Details; Report

Hassanal Bolkiah National Stadium
Attendance: 9,081
Referee: Abdul Malik

25 March 2009
19:45

Young Lions	1 – 0	Home United
Obadin Aikhena 72'	Details; Report

Jalan Besar Stadium
Attendance: 2,863
Referee: P Pandian

26 March 2009
19:45

SAFFC	6 – 0	Albirex Niigata (S)
Ahmad Latiff 32'; Aleksandar Duric 37' 54' 90'; John Wilkinson 42' 74'	Details; Report

Choa Chu Kang Stadium
Attendance: 2,084
Referee: T Aravinthan

26 March 2009
19:45

Woodlands Wellington	1 – 1	Gombak United
Zakaria Yousif 20'	Details; Report	Agu Casmir 89'

Woodlands Stadium
Attendance: 1,625
Referee: Muhd Taqi

27 March 2009
19:30

Super Reds	1 – 1	Tampines Rovers
Choi Dong Soo 52'	Details; Report	Seiji Kaneko 39'

Jalan Besar Stadium
Attendance: 2,543
Referee: Abdul Malik Bashir

=== Week 7 ===
The 7th week of the season runs from Monday 30 March to Sunday 5 April.

30 March 2009
19:45

Home United	4 – 0	Woodlands Wellington
Norikazu Murakami 55' 62' 80'; Kengne Ludovick 90'	Details; Report

Clementi Stadium
Attendance: 1,806
Referee: Sukhbir Singh

31 March 2009
19:45

Gombak United	3 – 1	SAFFC
Gabriel Obatola 31' 65' (pen.); Kingsley Njoku 52'	Details; Report	Ahmad Latiff 6'

Jurong West Stadium
Attendance: 2,870
Referee: Leow Thiam Hoe

1 April 2009
19:45

Sengkang Punggol	2 – 2	Balestier Khalsa
Indra Sahdan 37' 65'	Details; Report	Seth Galloway 10'; K Vikraman 63'

Hougang Stadium
Attendance: 1,562
Referee: Pandian Palaniyandi

2 April 2009
19:45

Albirex Niigata (S)	2 – 1	Young Lions
Kenji Adachihara 8'; Tetsuya Kishida 31'	Details; Report	Obadin Aikhena 90'

Jurong East Stadium
Attendance: 1,615
Referee: Zaid Bin Hussein

2 April 2009
19:45

Geylang United	1 – 0	Super Reds
Lloyd Butler 5'	Details; Report

Bedok Stadium
Attendance: 2,202
Referee: Abas Daud

3 April 2009
19:30

Tampines Rovers	1 – 1	Brunei DPMM
Sutee Suksomkit 75'	Details; Report	Shariff Abdul Samat 63' (o.g.)

Jalan Besar Stadium
Attendance: 3,809
Referee: T Aravinthan

=== Week 8 ===
The 8th week of the season runs from Monday 6 April to Sunday 12 April.

6 April 2009
19:45

Balestier Khalsa	0 – 1	Woodlands Wellington
	Details; Report	Jufri Taha 2' (o.g.)

Toa Payoh Stadium
Attendance: 1,964
Referee: Muhammad Adzhar Aziz

8 April 2009
19:45

Super Reds	2 – 1	Albirex Niigata (S)
Park Kang Jin 15'; Choi Dong Soo 60'	Details; Report	Shunsuke Sunaga 31'

Yishun Stadium
Attendance: 1,708
Referee: Jeevanathan

9 April 2009
19:45

Tampines Rovers	2 – 0	Young Lions
Noh Alam Shah 5'; Aliff Shafaein 42'	Details; Report

Tampines Stadium
Attendance: 2,521
Referee: Sukhbir Singh

10 April 2009
19:30

Brunei DPMM	2 – 1	Gombak United
Sairol Sahari 3', 73'	Details; Report	Emmanuel Emuejeraye 29'

Jalan Besar Stadium
Attendance: 3,546
Referee: Pandian Palaniyandi

11 April 2009
19:45

Sengkang Punggol	1 – 7	SAFFC
Anthony Bahadur 53'	Details; Report	Therdsak Chaiman 30' 55'; Ahmad Latiff 34' 90'; Mustaqim Manzur 59'; Kenji Arai 71'; Aleksandar Đurić 75'

Hougang Stadium
Attendance: 1,336
Referee: T Aravinthan

12 April 2009
19:45

Geylang United	1 – 0	Home United
Lloyd Butler 67'	Details; Report

Bedok Stadium
Attendance: 2,264
Referee: Leow Thiam Hoe

=== Week 9 ===
The 9th week of the season runs from Monday 13 April to Sunday 19 April.

13 April 2009
19:45

Young Lions	2 – 0	Balestier Khalsa
Irwan Shah 33'; Yang Mu 64'	Details; Report

Jalan Besar Stadium
Attendance: 1,898
Referee: W Ravisanthiran

14 April 2009
19:45

Albirex Niigata (S)	2 – 2	Brunei DPMM
Kenji Adachihara 10'; Kunihiro Honda 50'	Details; Report	Shahrazen Said 41'; Abdelhamid Berguiga 65'

Jurong East Stadium
Attendance: 1,747
Referee: Abas Daud

15 April 2009
19:45

Home United	3 – 0	Sengkang Punggol
Peres de Oliveira 45'; Kengne Ludovick 59'; Norikazu Murakami 73'	Details; Report

Clementi Stadium
Attendance: 904
Referee: P Pandian

16 April 2009
19:45

Gombak United	0 – 0	Tampines Rovers
	Details; Report

Jurong West Stadium
Attendance: 2,535
Referee: Abdul Malik

16 April 2009
19:45

Woodlands Wellington	0 – 2	Geylang United
	Details; Report	Lloyd Butler 12'; Rastislav Belicak 59'

Woodlands Stadium
Attendance: 1,466
Referee: T Aravinthan

17 April 2009
19:30

SAFFC	1 – 0	Super Reds
John Wilkinson 78'	Details; Report

Jalan Besar Stadium
Attendance: 3,440
Referee: Abas Daud

=== Week 10 ===
The 10th week of the season runs from Monday 20 April to Monday 27 April. The week is one day longer than normal so as to accommodate the break for Singapore Cup 2009 between 28 April and 6 May. The league will resume on 7 May.

20 April 2009
19:45

Tampines Rovers	1 – 0	Albirex Niigata (S)
Noh Alam Shah 8'	Details; Report

Tampines Stadium
Attendance: 2,420
Referee: Johan Jahari

22 April 2009
19:45

Geylang United	1 – 1	Young Lions
Shah Hirul 36'	Details; Report	Goh Swee Swee 34'

Bedok Stadium
Attendance: 1,978
Referee: Muhammad Adzhar Aziz

23 April 2009
19:45

Sengkang Punggol	1 – 0	Woodlands Wellington
Anthony Bahadur 45'	Details; Report

Hougang Stadium
Attendance: 1,604
Referee: Mohammad Taqi A Jahari

24 April 2009
19:30

Balestier Khalsa	1 – 4	Gombak United
Syaqir Sulaiman 89'	Details; Report	Gabriel Obatola 12' 14' 77' (pen.); Agu Casmir 82'

Jalan Besar Stadium
Attendance: 3,486
Referee: Sukhbir Singh

25 April 2009
19:45

Super Reds	1 – 0	Home United
Park Han Seok 28'	Details; Report

Yishun Stadium
Attendance: 1,024
Referee: T Aravinthan

26 April 2009
20:15

Brunei DPMM	2 – 1	SAFFC
Ivan Jerkovic 7'; Abdelhamid Berguiga 47'	Details; Report	Therdsak Chaiman 89'

Hassanal Bolkiah National Stadium
Attendance: 10,583
Referee: Abdul Malik

27 April 2009
19:45

Young Lions	2 – 3	Sengkang Punggol
Afiq Yunos 1'; Eugene Luo 68'	Details; Report	Indra Sahdan Daud 10' (pen.); Murphy Wiredu 42'; Anthony Bahadur 51'

Jalan Besar Stadium
Attendance: 1,559
Referee: Johan Bin Jahari

=== Week 11 ===
The 11th week of the season runs from Thursday 7 May to Sunday 10 May, following the break for Singapore Cup 2009.

7 May 2009
19:45

Gombak United	3 – 1	Geylang United
Agu Casmir 29' 90'; Kingsley Njoku 65'	Details; Report	Rickey Harris 90' (pen.)

Jurong West Stadium
Attendance: 2,541
Referee: Sukhbir Singh

7 May 2009
19:45

Albirex Niigata (S)	2 – 2	Balestier Khalsa
Kenji Adachihara 49'; Akira Takase 77'	Details; Report	Ednardo Moura 30'; Bryan Soane 90'

Jurong East Stadium
Attendance: 1,458
Referee: Jeevanathan

8 May 2009
19:30

Young Lions	1 – 1	Woodlands Wellington
Obadin Aikhena 86'	Details; Report	Daniel Hammond 42'

Jalan Besar Stadium
Attendance: 1,632
Referee: Leow Thiam Hoe

9 May 2009
19:45

SAFFC	4 – 2	Tampines Rovers
Therdsak Chaiman 25' (pen.); Shariff Abdul Samat 47' (o.g.); Aleksandar Duric 77' 90'	Details; Report	Noh Alam Shah 14'; Sutee Suksomkit 23' (pen.)

Choa Chu Kang Stadium
Attendance: 2,184
Referee: Abas Daud

10 May 2009
19:45

Home United	2 – 0	Brunei DPMM
Norikazu Murakami 60'; Kengne Ludovick 63'	Details; Report

Clementi Stadium
Attendance: 1,008
Referee: Sukhbir Singh

=== Week 12 ===
The 12th week of the season runs from Monday 11 May to Sunday 17 May.

11 May 2009
19:45

Gombak United	3 – 0	Sengkang Punggol
Gabriel Obatola 8' 88'; Agu Casmir 64'	Details; Report

Jurong West Stadium
Attendance: 2,272
Referee: Muhd Taqi

12 May 2009
19:45

Young Lions	0 – 5	Super Reds
	Details; Report	Park Kang Jin 24'; Choi Dong Soo 37' (pen.) 70'; Park Han Seok 49'; Kim Tae Young 63'

Jalan Besar Stadium
Attendance: 1,914
Referee: Abdul Malik

13 May 2009
19:45

Home United	1 – 1	Tampines Rovers
Fadzuhasny Juraimi 84'	Details; Report	Qiu Li 24'

Clementi Stadium
Attendance: 1,110
Referee: P Pandian

14 May 2009
19:45

SAFFC	3 – 1	Balestier Khalsa
Park Tae-Won 6'; Mustaqim Manzur 59'; Jufri Taha ( 82' (o.g.)	Details; Report	Bryan Soane 90'

Choa Chu Kang Stadium
Attendance: 1,835
Referee: Muhammad Adzhar Aziz

15 May 2009
19:30

Albirex Niigata (S)	2 – 0	Geylang United
Taisuke Akiyoshi 4'; Kenji Adachihara 83'	Details; Report

Jalan Besar Stadium
Attendance: 2,429
Referee: Muhd Taqi

16 May 2009
19:45

Brunei DPMM	1 – 0	Young Lions
Shahir Hamzah 56' (o.g.)	Details; Report

Hassanal Bolkiah National Stadium
Attendance: 4,856
Referee: T Aravinthan

=== Week 13 ===
The 13th week of the season runs from Monday 18 May to Sunday 24 May.

18 May 2009
19:45

Tampines Rovers	4 – 1	Woodlands Wellington
Benoit Croissant 40'; Seiji Kaneko 48'; Qiu Li 58'; Shukor Zailan 77'	Details; Report	Daniel Hammond 53'

Tampines Stadium
Attendance: 2,134
Referee: Sukhbir Singh

20 May 2009
19:45

Super Reds	3 – 1	Gombak United
Kim Yoon-Sik 35'; Park Kang Jin 53'; Park Han Seok 74'	Details; Report	Gabriel Obatola 17'

Yishun Stadium
Attendance: 1,108
Referee: Leow Thiam Hoe

21 May 2009
19:45

Woodlands Wellington	2 – 1	Brunei DPMM
Mojtaba Tehranizadeh 33'; Jamil Ali 64'	Details; Report	Abu Bakar Mahari 65'

Woodlands Stadium
Attendance: 1,330
Referee: Abas Daud

22 May 2009
19:30

Sengkang Punggol	1 – 0	Albirex Niigata (S)
Indra Sahdan 81'	Details; Report

Jalan Besar Stadium
Attendance: 1,414
Referee: T Aravinthan

23 May 2009
19:45

Balestier Khalsa	1 – 1	Home United
Syaqir Sulaiman 85'	Details; Report	Jumaat Bin Jantan 21'

Toa Payoh Stadium
Attendance: 1,741
Referee: Jeevanathan P M

24 May 2009
19:45

Geylang United	0 – 3	SAFFC
	Details; Report	Mustaqim Manzur 3'; Aleksandar Duric 55' 78'

Bedok Stadium
Attendance: 2,202
Referee: P Pandian

=== Week 14 ===
The 14th week of the season runs from Monday 25 May to Saturday 30 May. The league will then take a break for the League Cup.

25 May 2009
19:45

Young Lions	0 – 4	Gombak United
	Details; Report	Gabriel Obatola 25' (pen.) 32' (pen.); Agu Casmir 27'; Kingsley Njoku 90'

Jalan Besar Stadium
Attendance: 1,366
Referee: Zaid Bin Hussein

26 May 2009
19:45

Super Reds	0 – 0	Brunei DPMM
	Details; Report

Yishun Stadium
Attendance: 1,219
Referee: Abdul Malik

27 May 2009
19:45

Tampines Rovers	1 – 0	Balestier Khalsa
Noh Alam Shah 27'	Details; Report

Tampines Stadium
Attendance: 2,123
Referee: W Ravisanthiran

28 May 2009
19:45

Geylang United	2 – 0	Sengkang Punggol
Miroslav Latiak 66'; Noor Ali 83'	Details; Report

Bedok Stadium
Attendance: 1,682
Referee: Abas Daud

28 May 2009
19:45

Albirex Niigata (S)	3 – 3	Gombak United
Akira Takase 23'; Ken Matsumoto 49'; Kenji Adachihara 64'	Details; Report	Gabriel Obatola 12' (pen.); Kingsley Njoku 18'; Agu Casmir 34'

Jurong East Stadium
Attendance: 1,587
Referee: P Pandian

29 May 2009
19:30

Woodlands Wellington	1 – 0	Super Reds
Daniel Hammond 54' (pen.)	Details; Report

Jalan Besar Stadium
Attendance: 1,671
Referee: Zaid Bin Hussein

30 May 2009
19:45

Home United	2 – 1	SAFFC
Kengne Ludovick 62'; Peres de Oliveira 85'	Details; Report	Park Tae-Won 77'

Clementi Stadium
Attendance: 1,135
Referee: Abdul Malik

=== Week 15 ===
The 15th week of the season runs from Monday 22 June to Sunday 28 June. The league resume after the break for the League Cup.

22 June 2009
19:45

Woodlands Wellington	0 – 1	Albirex Niigata (S)
	Details; Report	Kenji Adachihara 16'

Woodlands Stadium
Attendance: 1,417
Referee: T Aravinthan

24 June 2009
20:15

Brunei DPMM	3 – 0	Geylang United
Azwan Saleh 21'; Abdelhamid Berguiga 69'; Oh Ddog Yi 85'	Details; Report

Sultan Hassal Bolkiah Stadium
Attendance: 5,949
Referee: Muhd Taqi

25 June 2009
19:45

Sengkang Punggol	1 – 1	Tampines Rovers
Hiroyuki Yamamoto 5'	Details; Report	Noh Alam Shah 87'

Hougang Stadium
Attendance: 1,602
Referee: Leow Thiam Hoe

26 June 2009
19:45

Balestier Khalsa	1 – 2	Super Reds
Ednardo Moura 5'	Details; Report	Yun Bo Young 17'; Sahairi Ramri 77' (o.g.)

Toa Payoh Stadium
Attendance: 616
Referee: P Pandian

27 June 2009
19:45

Gombak United	2 – 1	Home United
Kingsley Njoku 30'; Emmanuel Emuejeraye 41'	Details	Kengne Ludovick 90'

Jurong West Stadium
Attendance: 2,390
Referee: T Aravinthan

27 June 2009
19:45

SAFFC	2 – 1	Young Lions
Aleksandar Duric 23'; Zulfadli Zainal Abidin 89'	Details; Report	Razaleigh Khalik 57' (o.g.)

Choa Chu Kang Stadium
Attendance: 1,673
Referee: Abas Daud

28 June 2009
19:45

Tampines Rovers	3 – 1	Geylang United
Noh Alam Shah 22'; Qiu Li 25'; Fahrudin Mustafic 71' (pen.)	Details; Report	Ashrin Shariff 36'

Tampines Stadium
Attendance: 3,482
Referee: Abdul Malik

=== Week 16 ===
The 16th week of the season runs from Monday 29 June to Sunday 5 July.

29 June 2009
19:45

Super Reds	3 – 2	Sengkang Punggol
Choi Dong Soo 53' 58'; Kim Yoon Sik 85'	Details; Report	Anthony Bahadur 2'; Murphy Wiredu 29'

Yishun Stadium
Attendance: 926
Referee: K Kalimuthu

30 June 2009
19:45

Home United	3 – 1	Albirex Niigata (S)
Peres de Oliveira 11'; Tengku Mushadad 45'; Valery Hiek 66'	Details; Report	Kenji Adachihara 89'

Clementi Stadium
Attendance: 890
Referee: Jeevanathan P M

30 June 2009
19:45

Woodlands Wellington	1 – 4	SAFFC
Daniel Hammond 40' (pen.)	Details; Report	Aleksandar Duric 16' 88'; John Wilkinson 32' 58'

Woodlands Stadium
Attendance: 1,409
Referee: Zaid Hussein

1 July 2009
20:15

Brunei DPMM	2 – 0	Balestier Khalsa
Shahrazen Said 11'; Rene Komar 89'	Details; Report

Hassanal Bolkiah National Stadium
Attendance: 6,951
Referee: Abas Daud

2 July 2009
19:45

Tampines Rovers	2 – 0	Super Reds
Ridhuan Muhammad 5'; Noh Alam Shah 90' (pen.)	Details; Report

Tampines Stadium
Attendance: 2,001
Referee: T Aravinthan

3 July 2009
19:30

Albirex Niigata (S)	1 – 3	SAFFC
Tetsuya Kishida 90'	Details; Report	Shaiful Esah 39'; Syed Karim 45'; Zulfadli Zainal Abidin 75'

Jurong East Stadium
Attendance: 1,802
Referee: Abdul Malik

4 July 2009
19:45

Home United	3 – 2	Young Lions
Kengne Ludovick 13', 54'; Shi Jiayi 45' (pen.)	Details; Report	Fairoz Hasan 7'; Faritz Abdul Hameed 90'

Clementi Stadium
Attendance: 728
Referee: Zaid Hussein

4 July 2009
19:45

Gombak United	1 – 2	Woodlands Wellington
Agu Casmir 62'	Details; Report	Zakaria Yousif 77'; Jamil Ali 88'

Jurong West Stadium
Attendance: 2,185
Referee: K Kalimuthu

5 July 2009
20:10

Geylang United	2 – 0	Balestier Khalsa
Noor Ali 5'; Masrezwan Masturi 45'	Details; Report

Bedok Stadium
Attendance: 1,517
Referee: Johan Jahari

=== Week 17 ===
The 17th week of the season runs from Monday 6 June to Sunday 12 July.

6 July 2009
19:45

Sengkang Punggol	2 – 1	Brunei DPMM
Mamadou Diallo 42'; Murphy Wiredu 63'	Details; Report	Shahrazen Said 72'

Hougang Stadium
Attendance: 1,729
Referee: Leow Thiam Hoe

7 July 2009
19:45

SAFFC	4 – 1	Gombak United
John Wilkinson 17'; Park Tae-Won 40'; Aleksandar Duric 53' 77'	Details; Report	Theerawekin Seehawong 87'

Choa Chu Kang Stadium
Attendance: 2,065
Referee: T Aravinthan

7 July 2009
19:45

Woodlands Wellington	2 – 1	Home United
Precious Emuejeraye 16'; Mojtaba Tehranizadeh 30'	Details; Report	Norikazu Murakami 71'

Woodlands Stadium
Attendance: 1,023
Referee: Sukhbir Singh

8 July 2009
19:45

Young Lions	0 – 1	Albirex Niigata (S)
	Details; Report	Shinya Yamagishi 23'

Jalan Besar Stadium
Attendance: 1,331
Referee: W Ravisanthiran

8 July 2009
19:45

Super Reds	1 – 2	Geylang United
Seo Su Jong 36'	Details; Report	Kim Jae Hong 57'; Noor Ali 59'

Yishun Stadium
Attendance: 969
Referee: Abas Daud

9 July 2009
19:45

Balestier Khalsa	0 – 0	Sengkang Punggol
	Details; Report

Toa Payoh Stadium
Attendance: 1,584
Referee: Jeevanathan P M

10 July 2009
19:30

Tampines Rovers	2 – 1	Brunei DPMM
Noh Alam Shah 41' 86'	Details; Report	Shahrazen Said 39'

Jalan Besar Stadium
Attendance: 2,441
Referee: P Pandian

11 July 2009
19:45

Albirex Niigata (S)	1 – 1	Super Reds
Kenji Adachihara 46'	Details; Report	Chang Jo Yoon 71'

Jurong East Stadium
Attendance: 1,485
Referee: K Kalimuthu

11 July 2009
19:45

Home United	2 – 1	Geylang United
Kengne Ludovick 49' 60'	Details; Report	Hafiz Rahim 69'

Clementi Stadium
Attendance: 693
Referee: Abdul Malik

12 July 2009
19:45

Woodlands Wellington	2 – 1	Balestier Khalsa
Precious Emuejeraye 19'; Daniel Hammond 76' (pen.)	Details; Report	Oh In Kyun 90'

Woodlands Stadium
Attendance: 1,178
Referee: Muhd Taqi

12 July 2009
19:45

SAFFC	2 – 0	Sengkang Punggol
Aleksandar Duric 43' 50'	Details; Report

Choa Chu Kang Stadium
Attendance: 1,662
Referee: Johan Jahari

=== Week 18 ===
The 18th week of the season runs from Monday 13 June to Sunday 19 July.

13 July 2009
19:45

Young Lions	0 – 3	Tampines Rovers
	Details; Report	Ridhuan Muhammad 37' 41'; Qiu Li 83'

Jalan Besar Stadium
Attendance: 1,393
Referee: Jeevanathan P M

15 July 2009
19:45

Geylang United	4 – 0	Woodlands Wellington
Yasir Hanapi 12'; Masnashzreen Masturi 62'; Masrezwan Masturi 67'; Mojtaba Tehranizadeh 72' (o.g.)	Details; Report

Bedok Stadium
Attendance: 1,856
Referee: T Aravinthan

16 July 2009
19:45

Sengkang Punggol	2 – 3	Young Lions
Hyrulnizam Juma'at 35' (o.g.); Azhar Baksin 86'	Details; Report	Obadin Aikhena 9'; Safuwan Baharudin 67'; Khairul Nizam 71'

Hougang Stadium
Attendance: 1,778
Referee: Abas Daud

17 July 2009
19:30

Super Reds	2 – 0	SAFFC
Seo Su Jong 29'; Choi Dong Soo 58'	Details; Report

Jalan Besar Stadium
Attendance: 1,790
Referee: Abdul Malik

18 July 2009
20:15

Brunei DPMM	2 – 1	Albirex Niigata (S)
Haji Subhi Abdilah 75'; Ivan Jerkovic 79'	Details; Report	Tetsuya Kishida 40'

Hassanal Bolkiah National Stadium
Attendance: 4,249
Referee: Muhd Taqi

19 July 2009
19:45

Tampines Rovers	2 – 1	Gombak United
Qiu Li 27'; Sutee Suksomkit 37'	Details; Report	Fazrul Nawaz 26'

Tampines Stadium
Attendance: 2,887
Referee: K Kalimuthu

=== Week 19 ===
The 19th week of the season runs from Monday 20 June to Friday 24 July. The week is shortened as the Singapore National Team takes on Liverpool in a friendly on Sunday 26 July.

20 July 2009
19:45

Super Reds	0 – 0	Woodlands Wellington
	Details; Report

Yishun Stadium
Attendance: 1,061
Referee: Adzhar Adziz

21 July 2009
19:45

Balestier Khalsa	2 – 1	Young Lions
Oh In Kyun 25'; Jamie Pitt 56'	Details; Report	Madhu Mohana 48'

Toa Payoh Stadium
Attendance: 1,452
Referee: Johan Jahari

22 July 2009
19:45

Sengkang Punggol	1 – 2	Home United
Hiroyuki Yamamoto 32'	Details; Report	Peres de Oliveira 50' 87' (pen.)

Hougang Stadium
Attendance: 1,638
Referee: W Ravisanthiran

23 July 2009
19:45

Gombak United	3 – 3	Brunei DPMM
Emmanuel Emuejeraye 3'; Gabriel Obatola 59' 85' (pen.)	Details; Report	Shahrazen Said 71' 90'; Hamid Berguiga 78'

Jurong West Stadium
Attendance: 2,082
Referee: T Aravinthan

24 July 2009
19:30

Balestier Khalsa	2 – 0	Albirex Niigata (S)
Oh In Kyun 27' (pen.); Jun Jin 69'	Details; Report

Jalan Besar Stadium
Attendance: 1,184
Referee: Zaid Hussein

=== Week 20 ===
The 20th week of the season runs from Tuesday 28 July to Sunday 2 August. The week is shortened as the Singapore National Team takes on Liverpool in a friendly on Sunday 26 July.

28 July 2009
19:45

Gombak United	2 – 1	Balestier Khalsa
Gabriel Obatola 14' 67'	Details; Report	Oh Ddog Yi 73'

Jurong West Stadium
Attendance: 2,013
Referee: Muhd Taqi

29 July 2009
19:45

Home United	1 – 2	Super Reds
Peres de Oliveira 39'	Details; Report	Park Kang Jin 5'; Yu Hyun Koo 29'

Clementi Stadium
Attendance: 649
Referee: Sukhbir Singh

29 July 2009
19:45

SAFFC	0 – 0	Brunei DPMM
	Details; Report

Choa Chu Kang Stadium
Attendance: 3,091
Referee: Abas Daud

30 July 2009
19:45

Woodlands Wellington	0 – 0	Sengkang Punggol
	Details; Report

Woodlands Stadium
Attendance: 1,167
Referee: K Kalimuthu

30 July 2009
19:45

Albirex Niigata (S)	3 – 0	Tampines Rovers
Kenji Adachihara 35'; Ryota Kobayashi 60'; Akira Takase 70'	Details; Report

Jurong East Stadium
Attendance: 1,561
Referee: Abdul Malik

31 July 2009
19:30

Geylang United	1 – 1	Gombak United
Haruki Seto 55'	Details; Report	Goran Subara 26'

Jalan Besar Stadium
Attendance: 1,671
Referee: P Pandian

2 August 2009
19:45

Tampines Rovers	1 – 2	SAFFC
Akihiro Nakamura 67'	Details; Report	Park Tae Won 15' 22'

Tampines Stadium
Attendance: 2,195
Referee: Muhd Taqi

2 August 2009
20:15

Brunei DPMM	1 – 6	Home United
Ivan Jerkovic 82' (pen.)	Details; Report	Valery Hiek 42'; Kengne Ludovick 69' 72' 74'; Peres de Oliveira 78'; Fadzuhasny Juraimi 90'

Hassanal Bolkiah National Stadium
Attendance: 5,060
Referee: K Kalimuthu

=== Week 21 ===
The 21st week of the season runs from Tuesday 3rd to Saturday 8 August. The week is shortened as the country celebrate its National Day on 9 August and the national team prepares for a friendly against China on 12 August. The League will resume on 14 August.

3 August 2009
19:45

Geylang United	1 – 0	Albirex Niigata (S)
Haruki Seto 46'	Details; Report

Bedok Stadium
Attendance: 2,109
Referee: W Ravisanthiran

3 August 2009
19:45

Super Reds	1 – 1	Young Lions
Park Chul Hyung 87'	Details; Report	Yang Mu 56'

Yishun Stadium
Attendance: 970
Referee: Adzhar Adziz

4 August 2009
19:45

Sengkang Punggol	0 – 0	Gombak United
	Details; Report

Hougang Stadium
Attendance: 1,662
Referee: Johana Johari

5 August 2009
19:45

Balestier Khalsa	0 – 3	SAFFC
	Details; Report	Aleksandar Duric 45' 88' (pen.); Kenji Arai 45'

Toa Payoh Stadium
Attendance: 1,263
Referee: Zaid Hussein

6 August 2009
19:45

Tampines Rovers	2 – 3	Home United
Mustafic Fahrudin 6' (pen.); Seiji Kaneko 50'	Details; Report	Peres de Oliveira 39' 45' (pen.) 77'

Tampines Stadium
Attendance: 2,723
Referee: P Pandian

7 August 2009
19:30

Gombak United	1 – 1	Super Reds
Bah Mamadou 7'	Details; Report	Chang Jo Yoon 82'

Jalan Besar Stadium
Attendance: 2,350
Referee: Muhd Taqi

8 August 2009
20:15

Brunei DPMM	2 – 0	Woodlands Wellington
Drazen Govic 1'; Safari Wahit 53'	Details; Report

Hassanal Bolkiah National Stadium
Attendance: 4,372
Referee: T Aravinthan

=== Week 22 ===
Only one game was scheduled for week 22, the week was shortened as the national team was in action during midweek.

14 August 2009
19:30

Albirex Niigata (S)	2 – 1	Sengkang Punggol
Kenji Adachihara 2'; Kunihiro Honda 55'	Details; Report	Raymond Kwa 59'

Jalan Besar Stadium
Attendance: 1,171
Referee: Abdul Malik

=== Week 23 ===
The 23rd week of the season runs from Monday 17th to Sunday 23 August.

17 August 2009
19:45

Young Lions	0 – 5	SAFFC
	Details; Report	Aleksandar Duric 7' 41' (pen.) 69'; Therdsak Chaiman 34' (pen.); Kenji Arai 87'

Jalan Besar Stadium
Attendance: 1,369
Referee: Jeevanathan P M

17 August 2009
20:15

Brunei DPMM	3 – 2	Super Reds
Helmi Zambin 61'; Abdelhamid Berguiga 85'; Safari Wahit 88'	Details; Report	Yu Hyun-Koo 7'; Choi Dong-Soo 70'

Hassanal Bolkiah National Stadium
Attendance: 3,999
Referee: Abdul Malik

18 August 2009
19:45

Balestier Khalsa	0 – 1	Tampines Rovers
	Details; Report	Edward Tan 21'

Toa Payoh Stadium
Attendance: 1,498
Referee: Abas Daud

19 August 2009
19:45

Sengkang Punggol	0 – 3	Geylang United
	Details; Report	Masrezwan Masturi 2' 14'; Yasir Hanapi 10'

Hougang Stadium
Attendance: 1,306
Referee: T Aravinthan

20 August 2009
19:45

Gombak United	1 – 1	Albirex Niigata (S)
Gabriel Obatola 21'	Details; Report	Kenji Adachihara 49' (pen.)

Jurong West Stadium
Attendance: 1,888
Referee: Sukhbir Singh

21 August 2009
19:30

SAFFC	0 – 2	Home United
	Details; Report	Rosman Sulaiman 41'; Kengne Ludovick 47'

Jalan Besar Stadium
Attendance: 3,658
Referee: P Pandian

22 August 2009
19:45

Geylang United	4 – 3	Brunei DPMM
Masrezwan Masturi 4' 20'; Baihakki Khaizan 45'; Hafiz Rahim 82'	Details; Report	Abdelhamid Berguiga 39'; Suhaime Yussof 64'; Safari Wahit 79'

Bedok Stadium
Attendance: 847
Referee: Leow Thiam Hoe

22 August 2009
19:45

Woodlands Wellington	0 – 0	Young Lions
	Details; Report

Woodlands Stadium
Attendance: 989
Referee: Adzhar Adziz

23 August 2009
19:45

Super Reds	5 – 1	Balestier Khalsa
Kim Shin-Yui 6' 73'; Kim Yoon-Sik 15'; Yu Hyun Koo 48'; Seo Su Jong 85'	Details; Report	Jamie Pitt 49'

Yishun Stadium
Attendance: 564
Referee: T Aravinthan

=== Week 24 ===
The 24th week of the season ran from Monday 24 August to Thursday 27 August. The week was shortened to accommodate the Singapore Cup 2009 between 26 August and 4 September. The league resumed on 6 September.

24 August 2009
19:45

Home United	1 – 1	Gombak United
Juma'at Jantan 82'	Details; Report	Ruhaizad Ismail 87'

Clementi Stadium
Attendance: 762
Referee: Abas Daud

25 August 2009
19:45

Geylang United	0 – 1	Tampines Rovers
	Details; Report	Seiji Kaneko 75'

Bedok Stadium
Attendance: 971
Referee: Sukhbir Singh

27 August 2009
19:45

Albirex Niigata (S)	1 – 2	Home United
Kenji Adachihara 5'	Details; Report	Peres de Oliveira 77'; Valery Hiek 81'

Jurong East Stadium
Attendance: 1,031
Referee: Abdul Malik

27 August 2009
19:45

SAFFC	1 – 0	Woodlands Wellington
Park Tae-Won 75'	Details; Report

Choa Chu Kang Stadium
Attendance: 1,639
Referee: Muhd Taqi

=== Week 25 ===
The 25th week of the season runs from Sunday 6 September to Sunday 13 September. The week is one day longer than normal so as to accommodate the break for Singapore Cup 2009 between 26 and 4 August.

6 September 2009
19:45

Young Lions	2 – 0	Geylang United
Gabriel Quak 40'; Fadhil Noh 52'	Details; Report

Jalan Besar Stadium
Attendance: 1,345
Referee: K Kalimuthu

7 September 2009
19:45

Home United	3 – 0	Balestier Khalsa
Valery Hiek 15'; Azhar Sairudin 41'; Peres de Oliveira 89'	Details; Report

Clementi Stadium
Attendance: 754
Referee: W Ravisanthiran

8 September 2009
19:45

Woodlands Wellington	1 – 0	Tampines Rovers
Jamil Ali 17'	Details; Report

Woodlands Stadium
Attendance: 1,338
Referee: Abdul Malik

9 September 2009
19:45

SAFFC	4 – 1	Geylang United
Therdsak Chaiman 25' 32'; Aleksandar Duric 34'; Rastislav Belicak 45' (o.g.)	Details; Report	Noor Ali 20'

Choa Chu Kang Stadium
Attendance: 1,518
Referee: Abas Daud

10 September 2009
19:45

Balestier Khalsa	1 – 3	Brunei DPMM
Jun Jin 22'	Details; Report	Ivan Jerkovic 43', 80'; Abdelhamid Berguiga 62'

Clementi Stadium
Attendance: 1,121
Referee: Jeevanathan P M

10 September 2009
19:45

Gombak United	2 – 2	Young Lions
Obadin Aikhena 61' (o.g.); Agu Casmir 66'	Details; Report	Fadhil Noh 68'; Nazrul Ahmad Nazari 75'

Jurong West Stadium
Attendance: 1,623
Referee: Leow Thiam Hoe

11 September 2009
19:30

Tampines Rovers	3 – 1	Sengkang Punggol
Noh Alam Shah 13' 54' 90'	Details; Report	Anthony Bahadur 49'

Jalan Besar Stadium
Attendance: 1,324
Referee: P Pandian

=== Week 26 ===
The 26th week of the season runs from Monday 14 September to Sunday 20 September.

14 September 2009
19:45

Albirex Niigata (S)	2 – 0	Woodlands Wellington
Kenji Adachihara 78'; Park Myung Eun 83'	Details; Report

Jurong East Stadium
Attendance: 1,475
Referee: Johan Jahari

14 September 2009
19:45

Sengkang Punggol	0 – 2	Super Reds
	Details; Report	Seo Su-Jong 19'; Park Kang-Jin 32'

Hougang Stadium
Attendance: 912
Referee: Abas Daud

15 September 2009
19:45

Young Lions	0 – 1	Brunei DPMM
	Details; Report	Drazen Govic 5'

Jalan Besar Stadium
Attendance: 1,333
Referee: Sukhbir Singh

16 September 2009
19:45

Balestier Khalsa	0 – 1	Geylang United
	Details; Report	Masrezwan Masturi 36'

Toa Payoh Stadium
Attendance: 923
Referee: Muhd Taqi

17 September 2009
19:45

Super Reds	1 – 3	Tampines Rovers
Yu Hyun Koo 59'	Details; Report	Aliff Shafaein 35'; Sutee Suksomkit 62' (pen.) 76'

Yishun Stadium
Attendance: 689
Referee: Leow Thiam Hoe

18 September 2009
19:30

Woodlands Wellington	0 – 2	Gombak United
	Details; Report	Agu Casmir 22'; Gabriel Obatola 83' (pen.)

Jalan Besar Stadium
Attendance: 1,357
Referee: Abas Daud

=== Week 27 ===
The 27th week of the season runs from Monday 21 September to Sunday 27 September.

22 September 2009
19:45

Young Lions	2 – 1	Home United
Khairul Nizam 11'; Afiq Yunos 90'	Details; Report	Itimi Dickson 57'

Jalan Besar Stadium
Attendance: 1,345
Referee: W Ravisanthiran

23 September 2009
19:45

SAFFC	2 – 1	Albirex Niigata (S)
Aleksandar Duric 17' 71'	Details; Report	Ryohei Maeda 85'

Choa Chu Kang Stadium
Attendance: 1,365
Referee: Sukhbir Singh

25 September 2009
19:30

Home United	3 – 1	Woodlands Wellington
Ham Hyeong-Kyu 25' 82' 87'	Details; Report	Ismadi Mukhtar 35'

Jalan Besar Stadium
Attendance: 3,208
Referee: Zaid Hussein

=== Week 28 ===
The 28th week of the season runs from Monday 28 September to Sunday 4 October.

28 September 2009
19:45

Sengkang Punggol	1 – 3	Balestier Khalsa
Mamadou Diallo 50'	Details; Report	Anantha Rajan 11' (pen.); Oh In-Kyun 47' 71'

Hougang Stadium
Attendance: 975
Referee: K Kalimuthu

29 September 2009
20:15

Brunei DPMM	2 – 2	Tampines Rovers
Shahrazen Said 3'; Ivan Jerkovic 30' (pen.)	Details; Report	Khairul Amri 5' 53' (pen.)

Hassanal Bolkiah National Stadium
Attendance: 3,296
Referee: P Pandian

30 September 2009
19:45

Gombak United	2 – 1	SAFFC
Kingsley Njoku 41'; Agu Casmir 49'	Details; Report	Aleksandar Duric 90' (pen.)

Jurong West Stadium
Attendance: 1,806
Referee: Abdul Malik

1 October 2009
19:45

Albirex Niigata (S)	3 – 2	Young Lions
Kazuki Yoshino 4'; Kenji Adachihara 51' (pen.); Akira Takase 52'	Details; Report	Fazli Ayob 60'; Fadhil Noh 90'

Jurong East Stadium
Attendance: 1,493
Referee: Jeevanathan P M

2 October 2009
19:30

Geylang United	1 – 2	Super Reds
Masrezwan Masturi 59'	Details; Report	Yu Hyun-Koo 65'; Seo Su-Jong 90'

Jalan Besar Stadium
Attendance: 1,418
Referee: T Aravinthan

=== Week 29 ===
The 29th week of the season runs from Monday 5 October to Sunday 11 October. The week has fewer match to accommodate the Singapore Cup semi finals.

7 October 2009
19:45

Woodlands Wellington	2 – 5	Super Reds
Daniel Hammond 79' 81' (pen.)	Details; Report	Choi Dong-Soo 23' (pen.); Jeon Byung-Euk 36'; Kwon Jin 38'; Seo Su-Jong 77' 90'

Woodlands Stadium
Attendance: 1,108
Referee: K Kalimuthu

8 October 2009
19:45

Young Lions	2 – 0	Balestier Khalsa
Yang Mu 64'; Khairul Nizam 90'	Details; Report

Jalan Besar Stadium
Attendance: 1,630
Referee: Muhd Syahir

=== Week 30 ===
The 30th week of the season runs from Monday 12 October to Sunday 18 October.

12 October 2009
19:45

Home United	1 – 0	Sengkang Punggol
Naruphol Ar-Romsawa 57'	Details; Report

Clementi Stadium
Attendance: 1,053
Referee: W Ravisanthiran

13 October 2009
19:45

SAFFC	1 – 4	Super Reds
John Wilkinson 19'	Details; Report	Chang Jo Yoon 34' 38'; Choi Dong Soo 57' 80' (pen.)

Choa Chu Kang Stadium
Attendance: 2,185
Referee: Sukhbir Singh

14 October 2009
19:45

Tampines Rovers	0 – 1	Young Lions
	Details; Report	Khairul Nizam 46'

Tampines Stadium
Attendance: 1,311
Referee: Zaid Hussein

15 October 2009
19:45

Geylang United	1 – 2	Home United
Kim Jae Hong 26'	Details; Report	Peres de Oliveira 42'; Kengne Ludovick 90'

Bedok Stadium
Attendance: 1,445
Referee: Muhd Taqi

15 October 2009
19:45

Balestier Khalsa	0 – 1	Woodlands Wellington
	Details; Report	Precious Emuejeraye 90'

Toa Payoh Stadium
Attendance: 851
Referee: Leow Thiam Hoe

16 October 2009
19:30

Sengkang Punggol	0 – 1	SAFFC
	Details; Report	Aleksandar Duric 15'

Jalan Besar Stadium
Attendance: 1,712
Referee: Abdul Malik

17 October 2009
19:45

Gombak United	0 – 2	Tampines Rovers
	Details; Report	Qiu Li 36'; Aliff Shafaein 38'

Jalan Besar Stadium
Attendance: 1,777
Referee: Abas Daud

=== Week 31 ===
The 31st week of the season ran from Tuesday 20 October to Friday 23 October. The week was shortened to accommodate the National Team participation in the Ho Chi Minh City Football Tournament. The schedule was revised after DPMM Brunei was denied to continue playing in the League by FIFA.

20 October 2009
19:45

Woodlands Wellington	0 – 1	Geylang United
	Details; Report	Kim Jae-hong 90'

Woodlands Stadium
Attendance: 1,219
Referee: P Pandian

23 October 2009
19:30

Super Reds	2 – 2	Albirex Niigata (S)
Jeon Byung Euk 36'; Choi Dong Soo 57'	Details; Report	Tetsuya Kishida 14', 67'

Jalan Besar Stadium
Attendance: 1,523
Referee: Muhd Taqi

=== Week 32 ===
The 32nd week of the season runs from Tuesday 27 October to Saturday 31 October.

27 October 2009
19:45

Balestier Khalsa	0 – 4	Gombak United
	Details; Report	Gabriel Obatola 20' (pen.) 39' 90'; Fazrul Nawaz 61'

Toa Payoh Stadium
Attendance: 873
Referee: K Kalimuthu

27 October 2009
19:45

Tampines Rovers	4 – 0	Albirex Niigata (S)
Qiu Li 17'; Khairul Amri 60'; Benoit Croissant 83'; Shariff Samat 90'	Details; Report

Tampines Stadium
Attendance: 1,115
Referee: T Aravinthan

28 October 2009
19:45

Super Reds	2 – 3	Home United
Seo Su Jong 58'; Choi Dong-Soo 60'	Details; Report	Kengne Ludovick 5' 27'; Peres de Oliveira 45' (pen.)

Yishun Stadium
Attendance: 605
Referee: P Pandian

28 October 2009
19:45

Geylang United	0 – 1	Young Lions
	Details; Report	Yang Mu 44'

Bedok Stadium
Attendance: 769
Referee: Leow Thiam Hoe

30 October 2009
19:30

SAFFC	0 – 0	Tampines Rovers
	Details; Report

Jalan Besar Stadium
Attendance: 4,377
Referee: Abdul Malik

31 October 2009
19:45

Young Lions	4 – 2	Sengkang Punggol
Obadin Aikhena 2' (pen.); Fazli Ayob 21'; Khairul Nizam 33'; Gabriel Quak	Details; Report	Murphy Wiredu 3' 9'

Jalan Besar Stadium
Attendance: 940
Referee: Muhd Taqi

=== Week 33 ===
The 33rd week of the season runs from Tuesday 2 November to Friday 6 November. It was the final week of the 2009 season.

2 November 2009
19:45

Gombak United	2 – 2	Geylang United
Gabriel Obatola 24'; Kingsley Njoku 88'	Details; Report	Miroslav Latiak 4'; Yasir Hanapi 71'

Jurong West Stadium
Attendance: 1,782
Referee: P Pandian

5 November 2009
19:45

Albirex Niigata (S)	3 – 0	Balestier Khalsa
Atsushi Shimono 28'; Tetsuya Kishida 80'; Ken Matsumoto 85' (pen.)	Details; Report

Jurong East Stadium
Attendance: 1,445
Referee: Abas Daud

6 November 2009
19:30

Sengkang Punggol	2 – 1	Woodlands Wellington
Farizal Basri 57' (pen.); Murphy Wiredu 90'	Details; Report	Precious Emuejeraye 68' (pen.)

Jalan Besar Stadium
Attendance: 1,533
Referee: Leow Thiam Hoe

== Goals ==
=== Top Scorers ===
Rank	Scorer	Club	Goals
1	Aleksandar Đurić	Singapore Armed Forces	28
2	(Nigeria) Gabriel Obatola	Gombak United	24
3	(Cameroon) Kengne Ludovick	Home United	18
4	(Japan) Kenji Adachihara	(Japan) Albirex Niigata FC (S)	16
5	(Brazil) Peres de Oliveira	Home United	15
6	Noh Alam Shah	Tampines Rovers	14
7	(South Korea) Choi Dong-Soo	(South Korea) Super Reds	13
8	Agu Casmir	Gombak United	12
9	John Wilkinson	Singapore Armed Forces	11
10	(Thailand) Sutee Suksomkit	Tampines Rovers	8
10	(Brunei) Shahrazen Said	(Brunei) DPMM FC	8
10	Qiu Li	Tampines Rovers	8
10	(South Korea) Seo Su Jong	(South Korea) Super Reds	8
10	(Nigeria) Kingsley Njoku	Gombak United	8
10	(Canada) Murphy Wiredu	Sengkang Punggol	8

=== Own goals ===
Scorer	Club	Opponent	Date
Shariff Abdul Samat	Tampines Rovers	(Brunei) DPMM FC	3 April 2009
Shariff Abdul Samat	Tampines Rovers	SAFFC	9 May 2009
Jufri Taha	Balestier Khalsa	Woodlands Wellington	6 April 2009
Jufri Taha	Balestier Khalsa	SAFFC	14 May 2009
Shahir Hamzah	(Singapore) Young Lions	(Brunei) DPMM FC	16 May 2009
Sahairi Ramri	Balestier Khalsa	Super Reds	26 June 2009
Razaleigh Khalik	SAFFC	(Singapore) Young Lions	27 June 2009
(Iran) Mojtaba Tehranizadeh	Woodlands Wellington	Geylang United	15 July 2009
Hyrulnizam Juma'at	(Singapore) Young Lions	Sengkang Punggol	16 July 2009
(Slovakia) Rastislav Beličák	Geylang United	SAFFC	9 September 2009
(Nigeria) Obadin Aikhena	(Singapore) Young Lions	Gombak United	10 September 2009

=== Hat-tricks ===
Scorer	Club	Opponent	Date
Aleksandar Đurić	SAFFC	(Japan) Albirex Niigata (S)	26 March 2009
Aleksandar Đurić	SAFFC	(Singapore) Young Lions	17 August 2009
(Nigeria) Gabriel Obatola	Gombak United	Balestier Khalsa	24 April 2009
(Nigeria) Gabriel Obatola	Gombak United	Balestier Khalsa	27 October 2009
(Japan) Norikazu Murakami	Home United	Woodlands Wellington	30 March 2009
(Cameroon) Kengne Ludovick	Home United	(Brunei) DPMM FC	2 August 2009
(Brazil) Peres de Oliveira	Home United	Tampines Rovers	6 August 2009
Noh Alam Shah	Tampines Rovers	Sengkang Punggol	11 September 2009
(South Korea) Ham Hyeong-Kyu	Home United	Woodlands Wellington	25 September 2009

== Kits and main sponsors ==
Team	Kitmaker	Main Sponsor	Notes
(Japan) Albirex Niigata (S)	Adidas	Sanyo	
Balestier Khalsa	Umbro	Civics Ambulance & FTMS Global	
(Brunei) DPMM FC	Lotto	Sri Sentosa SDN BHD	
Geylang United	Lotto	Five Star Tours	Lotto replaces Diadora as kit-maker
Gombak United	Lotto	None	
Home United	Kappa	Coca-Cola	
SAFFC	Umbro	STAR Automotive Centre & United Engineers Limited	
Sengkang Punggol	Uhlsport	None	
Super Reds	Umbro	QT Technology	
Tampines Rovers	Dal	Hyundai	
Woodlands Wellington	Umbro	Sembcorp	
(Singapore) Young Lions	Nike	None	

== Stadia and attendance ==
=== Stadia ===
Team	Stadium	Capacity	Notes
(Japan) Albirex Niigata (S)	Jurong East Stadium	2,700	
Balestier Khalsa	Toa Payoh Stadium	3,896	
(Brunei) DPMM FC	Hassanal Bolkiah National Stadium	30,000	
Geylang United	Bedok Stadium	3,864	
Gombak United	Jurong West Stadium	4,000	
Home United	Clementi Stadium	4,000	Move from Bishan Stadium as it is undergoing upgrading programme for the 2010 YOG
Singapore Armed Forces	Choa Chu Kang Stadium	4,600	
Sengkang Punggol	Hougang Stadium	2,500	
(South Korea) Super Reds	Yishun Stadium	3,400	
Tampines Rovers	Tampines Stadium	3,580	
Woodlands Wellington	Woodlands Stadium	4,300	
(Singapore) Young Lions	Jalan Besar Stadium	6,000	

- The league plays all its Friday matches, which is televised live on MediaCorp Channel 5, at the Jalan Besar Stadium. An exception is when the AYG 2009 is in process, matches are played on the Home stadiums of the home team.

=== Attendance ===
The League will only play 193 matches after Brunei DPMM were unable to complete the season.

Team	Hosted	Average	Highest	Lowest	Total
(Brunei) DPMM FC	13	5,681	10,583	3,296	73,850
Tampines Rovers	16	2,396	3,809	1,115	38,333
Singapore Armed Forces	17	2,381	4,377	1,365	40,479
Gombak United	17	2,235	3,117	1,623	37,994
Geylang United	17	1,886	4,012	769	32,059
Sengkang Punggol	17	1,712	4,230	912	29,106
(Singapore) Young Lions	16	1,648	3,000	940	26,373
Balestier Khalsa	17	1,556	3,486	616	26,454
(Japan) Albirex Niigata (S)	16	1,562	2,429	1,031	24,991
Woodlands Wellington	16	1,396	2,976	989	22,328
(South Korea) Super Reds	16	1,335	2,543	564	21,357
Home United	15	1,343	3,664	649	20,147
Total	193	2,039	10,583	564	393,471

== Managerial changes ==
Team	Outgoing manager	Manner of departure	Replaced by	Date of appointment	Position in table
Sengkang Punggol	Jörg Steinebrunner	Mutual Consent	Aide Iskandar	June 2009	10th

== S-League Awards Night Winners ==
The winners will be announced on 9 November 2009 on the 14th Great Eastern-YEO’S S.League Awards Night.

Awards	Winners
Player of the Year	Valery Hiek (Home United)
Young Player of the Year	Gabriel Obatola (Gombak United)
Coach of the Year	Richard Bok (SAFFC)
Top Scorer Award	Aleksandar Đurić (SAFFC)
Fair Play Award	Home United
Referee of the Year	P Pandian
Assistant Referee of the Year	Jeffrey Goh
Goal of the Year	Ahmad Latiff (SAFFC) (vs Albirex Niigata FC (S) on 26 March @ Choa Chu Kang Stadium)
Fan Club of the Year	SAFFC
Story of the Year	Wang Meng Meng (The Straits Times) - "Alam Shah : Why I’m who I am"
Picture of the Year	Lim Kok Meng (Lianhe Zaobao) - “Balestier Khalsa Australia striker Bryan Soane has a tough time roughing out Geylang United defender Walid Lounis tackle”
People's Choice Award	Gabriel Obatola (Gombak United)
