= 2006 S.League =

S. League
- Season: 2006
- Champions: Singapore Armed Forces; 5th S.League title
- AFC Cup: Singapore Armed Forces (S.League winners); Tampines Rovers (Singapore Cup winners)
- Matches played: 165
- Goals scored: 557 (3.38 per match)
- Top goalscorer: (Morocco) Laakkad Abdelhadi (23)
- Biggest home win: Tampines Rovers 6-1 Geylang United (16 April 2006)
- Biggest away win: Sengkang Punggol 0-5 Tampines Rovers (20 June 2006)
- Highest scoring: Gombak United 4-5 Balestier Khalsa (14 September 2006)

2006 S.League was the eleventh season of Singapore's professional football league. It was won by Singapore Armed Forces, which was their fifth league title.

== Changes from 2005 ==
- Paya Lebar Punggol merged with the returning Sengkang Marine to form Sengkang Punggol.
- Gombak United also returned to the league after pulling out in 2002.
- Sporting Afrique were a foreign team made up of players from four different African countries – Kenya, Nigeria, Cameroon and Ghana.
- Sinchi went out of operation at the end of 2005 season.

== Foreign players ==
Each club is allowed to have a maximum of 4 foreign players, except Young Lions.

Club	Player 1	Player 2	Player 3	Player 4	Player 5	Former Players
Balestier Khalsa	(Japan) Norikazu Murakami	(Japan) Akihiro Nakamura	(Nigeria) Osagie Ederaro	(Cameroon) Kengne Ludovick	None	
Geylang International	(Thailand) Rangsan Viwatchaichok	(Japan) Ryuji Sueoka	(South Korea) Bae Jin-soo	(Bulgaria) Boyko Kamenov	None	(South Korea) Nam Woung-ki
Gombak United	(Thailand) Theerawekin Seehawong	(Nigeria) Gabriel Obatola	(Nigeria) Obadin Aikhena	(Nigeria) Alfred Emuejeraye	None	(Thailand) Pongpisuth Pue-on
Home United	(Thailand) Sutee Suksomkit	(South Korea) Jeon Kyeong-joon	(Sierra Leone) Mohamed Coker Junior	(Brazil) Bel	None	(Thailand) Anurak Srikerd (Hungary) Checzy Zoltan (Hungary) Gabor Boer
Sengkang Punggol	(Australia) Jon Angelucci	(Australia) Steve McDonald	(Ghana) Kim Grant	(Scotland) Ricky Waddell	None	(South Korea) Ahn Tae-hyuk
SAFFC	(Thailand) Therdsak Chaiman	(Japan) Kenji Arai	(Australia) Aleksandar Đurić	(England) John Wilkinson	None	
Tampines Rovers	(Thailand) Santi Chaiyaphurk	(Thailand) Choketawee Promrut	(Serbia and Montenegro) Sead Muratović	(Brazil) Peres De Oliveira	None	
Woodlands	(South Korea) Park Tae-won	(Cameroon) Essa Basile	(Morocco) Laakkad Abdelhadi	(Romania) Lucian Dronca	None	
(Singapore) Young Lions FC	(China) Qiu Li	(Cameroon) Moudourou Moise	(China) Che Hao	(China) Li Jisheng	(China) Guan Hongyu	

- Albirex Niigata (S) and Sporting Afrique are not allowed to hire any foreigners.

== League table ==
Pos	Team	Pld	W	D	L	GF	GA	GD	Pts	Qualification
1	Singapore Armed Forces	30	20	8	2	71	36	+35	68	Qualification to AFC Cup Group Stage (Note: Tampines qualified as 2006 Singapore Cup winners)
2	Tampines Rovers	30	16	9	5	70	42	+28	57	Qualification to AFC Cup Group Stage
3	(Singapore) Young Lions	30	15	7	8	67	43	+24	52	
4	Home United	30	15	6	9	49	40	+9	51	
5	Woodlands Wellington	30	13	8	9	60	45	+15	47	
6	(Japan) Albirex Niigata (S)	30	12	9	9	52	44	+8	45	
7	Balestier Khalsa	30	10	7	13	50	61	−11	37	
8	Gombak United	30	8	8	14	48	54	−6	32	
9	(Nigeria) (Cameroon) (Kenya) (Ghana) Sporting Afrique	30	5	9	16	36	58	−22	24	
10	Geylang United	30	6	5	19	22	62	−40	23	
11	Sengkang Punggol	30	4	6	20	32	72	−40	18	

Source: RSSSF
Rules for classification: 1) points; 2) goal difference; 3) number of goals scored

== Top goalscorers ==
Rank	Name	Club	Goals
1	(Morocco) Laakkad Abdelhadi	Woodlands Wellington	23
2	Khairul Amri	(Singapore) Young Lions	21
3	Mirko Grabovac	Tampines Rovers	20
4	(Bosnia and Herzegovina) (Australia) Aleksandar Đurić	Singapore Armed Forces	19
4	(China) Qiu Li	(Singapore) Young Lions	19
6	(Cameroon) Kengne Ludovick	Balestier Khalsa	15
7	Egmar Goncalves	Home United	14
7	(Brazil) Peres De Oliveira	Tampines Rovers	14
7	Ashrin Shariff	Singapore Armed Forces	14
7	Agu Casmir	Woodlands Wellington	14
11	(Japan) Eiichiro Ozaki	(Japan) Albirex Niigata (S)	13
11	(South Korea) Jeon Kyeong-Joon	Home United	13
11	Noh Alam Shah	Tampines Rovers	13
11	(Japan) Norikazu Murakami	Balestier Khalsa	13
