= 2008 Singapore League Cup =

Tournament details
- Country: Singapore
- Dates: May 2008 - June 2008
- Teams: 12

Final positions
- Champions: Gombak United
- Runners-up: Super Reds FC
- Third place: Balestier Khalsa FC

Tournament statistics
- Top goal scorer: Ojimi Gabriel Obatola (6 goals)

The 2008 Singapore League Cup was the 2nd edition of the Singapore League Cup. Its official sponsored name for 2008 was the Avaya-J&J League Cup.

In 2007, the event was held before the start of the S.League season (and served as a pre-season warm-up tournament). However, in 2008, the event was held during the S.League season. It consisted of all 12 S.League teams in that season. The cup was played over four rounds. The top four teams in the S.League in 2007 were given a bye to the quarter-final stage. The final was played on 16 June at Jalan Besar Stadium, with Gombak United defeating Super Reds FC. The defending champions, Woodlands Wellington, were eliminated in the first round.

== Teams ==
- (Japan) Albirex Niigata Singapore F.C.
- Balestier Khalsa FC
- (China) Dalian Shide Siwu FC
- Geylang United FC
- Gombak United FC
- Home United FC
- Sengkang Punggol FC
- Singapore Armed Forces FC (SAFFC)
- (South Korea) Super Reds FC
- Tampines Rovers FC
- Woodlands Wellington FC
- (Singapore) Young Lions

=== Round one ===
The draw for the first knockout round was held on Tuesday, 13 May 2008 in Singapore. The first round matches began on 30 May. The winners advanced to the quarter-final stage. Teams who had finished in the top 4 positions of the 2007 S.League received a bye and did not participate in the round one knockout competition. The four byes were Singapore Armed Force FC, Home United, Tampines Rovers and Gombak United respectively.

30 May
19:30

(China) Dalian Shide Siwu FC	0 – 1	(Japan) Albirex Niigata FC (S)
	Report	Ryota Doi 28'

Queenstown Stadium
Attendance: 745
Referee: John Chia

30 May
19:30

Woodlands Wellington	3 – 3 (A.E.T) (4 – 5 pens)	(Singapore) Young Lions
Park Tae Won (Pen.) 44', 90'; Fadzuhasny Juraimi 107'	Report	K Sivaseshan 90+1'; Zulfadli Zainal Abidin 90+3'; Obadin Aikhena 111'

Woodlands Stadium
Attendance: 1,767
Referee: Abas Daud

31 May
19:45

(South Korea) Super Reds	3 – 0	Sengkang Punggol
Sin Hyun Ho (Pen.) 3'; Oh Ddog Yi 9'; Seo Su Jong 43'	Report

Yishun Stadium
Attendance: 851
Referee: T Aravinthan

31 May
19:45

Geylang United	1 – 2	Balestier Khalsa
Miroslav Latiak 30'	Report	Mba Vitus Onyekachi 22', Faizal Amir 63'

Bedok Stadium
Attendance: 1,748
Referee: P Pandian

=== Knockout Bracket - Starting from Quarter-Finals ===
Quarter-final
Home United	1, 0 (1)
Gombak United	1, 1 (2)
(Singapore) Young Lions	0, 3 (3)
Tampines Rovers	1, 2 (3)
SAFFC	0, 1 (1)
Balestier Khalsa	3, 2 (5)
(South Korea) Super Reds	3, 3 (6)
(Japan) Albirex Niigata FC (S)	0, 1 (1)

Semi-final
Gombak United	4, 1 (5)
(Singapore) Young Lions	1, 1 (2)
Balestier Khalsa	0, 0 (0)
(South Korea) Super Reds	1, 0 (1)

Final
Gombak United	2
(South Korea) Super Reds	1

== Quarter-finals ==
1st Legs

3 June
19:45

Gombak United	1 – 1	Home United
Ojimi Gabriel Obatola (Pen.) 75'	Report	Farhan Farook 68'

Jurong West Stadium
Attendance: 1,918
Referee: Sukhbir Singh

3 June
19:45

(Singapore) Young Lions	0 – 1	Tampines Rovers
	Report	Shahdan Sulaiman 6'

Jalan Besar Stadium
Attendance: 1,564
Referee: Leow Thiam Hoe

4 June
19:45

SAFFC	0 – 3	Balestier Khalsa
	Report	Mba Vitus Onyekachi 3'; Faizal Amir 20'; Paul Bekombo 67'

Choa Chu Kang Stadium
Attendance: 1,825
Referee: Muhd Adzhar Aziz

4 June
19:45

(South Korea) Super Reds	3 – 0	(Japan) Albirex Niigata FC (S)
Oh Ddog Yi 43'; Moon Soon Ho 80'; Yun Bo Young 90'	Report

Yishun Stadium
Attendance: 842
Referee: Abas Daud

2nd Legs

6 June
19:30

Home United	0 – 1	Gombak United
	Report	Ojimi Gabriel Obatola (Pen.) 36'

Bishan Stadium
Attendance: 1,243
Referee: Abdul Malik Bashir
- Gombak United progressed 2-1 on aggregate score

7 June
19:30

Balestier Khalsa	2 – 1	SAFFC
M V Onyekachi 7'; K T Giscard 49'	Report	Ashrin Shariff 15'

Toa Payoh Stadium
Attendance: 1,944
Referee: Abas Daud
- Balestier Khalsa progressed 5-1 on aggregate score

6 June
19:30

Tampines Rovers	2 – 3	(Singapore) Young Lions
Fathi Yunus 30'; Aliff Shafaein 64'	Report	Firdaus Idros 48'; Izzdin Shafiq (Pen.) 56', 67'

Tampines Stadium
Attendance: 1,909
Referee: S Kumar
- Young Lions progressed on away goals rule after 3-3 draw on aggregate score

7 June
19:30

(Japan) Albirex Niigata FC (S)	1 – 3	(South Korea) Super Reds
Ryota Doi 73'	Report	Seo Su Jong (Pen.) 30'; U Ja Rang 49'; Oh Ddog Yi 65'

Jurong East Stadium
Attendance: 1,584
Referee: Muhd Taqi
- Super Reds progressed 6-1 on aggregate score

== Semi-finals ==
1st Legs

9 June
19:45

Gombak United	4 – 1	(Singapore) Young Lions
Kingsley Njoku 26', 32'; Ojimi Gabriel Obatola 58', 60'	Report	Firdaus Idros 90'

Jurong West Stadium
Attendance: 1,713
Referee: John Chia

10 June
19:45

Balestier Khalsa	0 – 1	(South Korea) Super Reds
	Report	Sin Hyun Ho (Pen.) 47'

Toa Payoh Stadium
Attendance: 2,181
Referee: Abdul Malik Bashir

2nd Legs

12 June
19:45

(Singapore) Young Lions	1 – 1	Gombak United
Sufian Anuar 71'	Report	T Seehawong 15'

Jalan Besar Stadium
Attendance: 1,829
Referee: T Aravinthan
- Gombak United progressed 5-2 on aggregate score

13 June
19:45

(South Korea) Super Reds	0 – 0	Balestier Khalsa
	Report

Yishun Stadium
Attendance: 828
Referee: Abas Daud
- Super Reds FC progressed 1-0 on aggregate score

== 3rd-place Playoff ==
16 June
17:00

(Singapore) Young Lions	2 – 3	Balestier Khalsa
Sufian Anuar 8'; Firdaus Idros 52'	Report	Rhysh Roshan Rai 6', 23'; Paul Bekombo 72'

Jalan Besar Stadium
Attendance: 3,264
Referee: Muhd Taqi

== Final ==
16 June
19:45

Gombak United	2 – 1	(South Korea) Super Reds FC
G Obatola 34', 90'	Report	Jeon Byung Euk 50'

Jalan Besar Stadium
Attendance: 3,246
Referee: S Kumar

== Top scorers ==
Last updated 16 June 2008

Rank	Player	Club	Goals
1	(Nigeria) Ojimi Gabriel Obatola	Gombak United	6
2	(South Korea) Oh Ddog Yi	(South Korea) Super Reds	3
=	(Nigeria) Mba Vitus Onyekachi	Balestier Khalsa	3
=	(Singapore) Firdaus Idros	(Singapore) Young Lions	3

== See also ==
- S.League
- Singapore Cup
- Singapore League Cup
- Singapore Charity Shield
- Football Association of Singapore
- List of football clubs in Singapore
