= 2007 Singapore League Cup =

Tournament details
- Dates: Feb 2007
- Teams: 8

Final positions
- Champions: Woodlands Wellington
- Runners-up: Sengkang Punggol
- Third place: Home United

The inaugural Singapore League Cup was held in 2007. The tournament was held before the start of the S.League season that year. Prior to this tournament, there is another tournament with the same name that was held until in 1997 where the Singapore Armed Forces had defeated Geylang United by 1-0 in the final. However that old Singapore League Cup was subsequently renamed into present Singapore Cup and evolved to be the major cup competition in Singapore football. In recent years, invitational foreign teams participated in the Singapore Cup along with the local clubs. The League Cup, however, is solely reserved for domestic clubs.

The 2007 competition was sponsored by SingTel, and officially titled the SingTel League Cup. A direct knockout format was used, with the first round being the quarter-final stage as only eight out of the twelve S.League teams participated in the competition.

The 4 teams who withdrew due to prior pre-season commitments were:

- Geylang United
- (China) Liaoning Guangyuan
- SAFFC
- (Singapore) Young Lions

The winners received a prize of S$20,000 with the runners-up and second runners-up taking home S$10,000 and S$5,000 respectively.

Woodlands Wellington defeated Sengkang Punggol 4-0 in the final to win the first Singapore League Cup. Gombak United defeated Home United in the third-place match 9-8 on penalties following a 1-1 draw.

== Results ==
=== Round one ===
15 Feb
19:45

Sengkang Punggol	2 – 1	Balestier Khalsa
Ross McKenzie 61'; Ekollo (Pen.) 90'	Summary	Ryuji Sueoka 61'

15 Feb
19:45

Gombak United	2 – 1	(Japan) Albirex Niigata (S)
O. J. Obatola 18', 61'	Summary	Eiichiro Ozaki 66'

16 Feb
19:45

(South Korea) Super Reds	0 – 2	Woodlands Wellington
	Summary	Laakkad Abdelhadi 28'; Latiff 52'

16 Feb
19:45

Tampines Rovers	1 – 1	Home United
Peres de Oliveira 4'	Summary	Bangaly 70'
Penalties
	1 – 4

=== Semifinals ===
20 Feb
19:45

Sengkang Punggol	0 – 0	Gombak United
	Summary
Penalties
	4 – 2

Hougang Stadium

21 Feb
19:45

Woodlands Wellington	2 – 0	Home United
Park Tae-Won 40'; Laakkad Abdelhadi 65'	Summary; Reaction

Woodlands Stadium
Attendance: 1804

=== Third Place Playoff ===
24 Feb
19:45

Home United	1 – 1	Gombak United
Egmar Goncalves 38'	Summary	O. J. Obatola 40'
Penalties
	9 – 8

Jalan Besar Stadium

=== Final ===
25 Feb
19:45

Sengkang Punggol	0 – 4	Woodlands Wellington
	Summary	Lucian Dronca (Pen) 19'; Akihiro Nakamura 38'; Park Tae-Won 56'; Laakkad Abdelhadi 85'

Jalan Besar Stadium
Attendance: 4071
Referee: Abas Daud
