= Ryōta =

- Gender: Male

Origin
- Origin: Japanese
- Meaning: Different meanings depending on the kanji used

Ryōta, Ryota or Ryouta is a masculine Japanese given name. Notable people with the name include:

- Ryota Aikawa (相川 良太; born 1977), Nippon Professional Baseball player for the Orix Buffaloes
- Ryota Aoki (footballer, born 1984), Japanese footballer who plays for JEF United Ichihara Chiba
- Ryota Aoki (footballer, born 1996), Japanese footballer who plays for Nagoya Grampus
- Ryota Arimitsu (有光 亮太; born 1981), Japanese footballer
- Ryota Doi (土井 良太; born 1987), Japanese footballer
- Ryota Fukunaga (born 1998), Japanese para-athlete
- Ryota Hasegawa (長谷川 崚太; born 1993), Japanese rugby union player
- Ryota Hayasaka (早坂 良太; born 1985), Japanese footballer
- Ryota Igarashi (五十嵐 亮太; born 1979), Japanese baseball player
- Ryota Ishioka (石岡 諒太; born 1992), Japanese baseball player
- Ryota Isomura (磯村 亮太; born 1991), Japanese footballer
- Ryota Katayose (片寄 涼太; born 1994), Japanese singer and actor
- Ryota Kobayashi (小林 亮太; born 1988), Japanese footballer
- Ryota Kohama (小浜 良太; born 1989), Japanese musician
- Ryōta Komatsu (小松 亮太; born October 30, 1973), Japanese bandoneón player
- Ryota Miki (三木 良太; born 1985), Japanese football player
- Ryota Morioka (森岡 亮太; born 1991), Japanese footballer
- Ryota Moriwaki (森脇 良太; born 1986), Japanese footballer
- Ryouta Murai (村井 良大; born 1988), Japanese actor
- Ryōta Murata (村田 諒太; born 1986), Japanese boxer
- Ryota Nagata (永田 亮太; born 1985), Japanese footballer
- Ryota Nakamura (中村 亮太; born 1991), Japanese footballer
- Ryōta Ōsaka (逢坂 良太; born 1986), Japanese voice actor
- Ryota Oshima (大島 僚太; born 1993), Japanese footballer
- Ryota Ozawa (小澤 亮太; born 1988), Japanese actor
- Ryōta Suzuki (voice actor) (鈴木 崚汰; born 1998), Japanese voice actor
- Ryota Suzuki (footballer) (鈴木 椋大; born 1994), Japanese footballer
- Ryota Takasugi (髙杉 亮太; born 1984), Japanese footballer
- Ryota Takeda (武田 良太; born 1968), Japanese politician serving in the House of Representatives in the Diet
- Ryōta Takeuchi (竹内 良太; born 1982), Japanese voice actor
- Ryota Taohata (垰畑 亮太; born 1988), Japanese badminton player
- Ryota Wakiya (脇谷 亮太; born 1981), Nippon Professional Baseball player for the Yomiuri Giants in Japan's Central League
- Ryota Watanabe (渡辺 亮太; born 1991), Japanese footballer
- Ryota Yamagata (山縣 亮太; born 1992), Japanese sprinter
- Ryota Yamamoto (山本 涼太; born 1997), Japanese Nordic combined skier
- Ryota Yutakayama (豊山 亮太; born 1993), Japanese sumo wrestler

== Fictional characters ==
- Ryota Kise (黄瀬 涼太) from Kuroko's Basketball
- Ryota Mitarai (御手洗 亮太) from Danganronpa 3: The End of Kibougamine Gakuen
- Ryota Suzui (鈴井 涼太) from Kakegurui
