= Lloyd Butler =

Lloyd Butler is the name of:

- Lloyd Butler (footballer), English footballer
- Lloyd Butler (rower), American rower

== See also ==
- Butler (surname)
