= Ahmad Latiff Khamaruddin =

Singaporean footballer

Ahmad Latiff Khamarudin
Personal information
- Full name: Ahmad Latiff bin Khamarudin
- Date of birth: 29 May 1979 (age 47)
- Place of birth: Singapore
- Height: 1.72 m (5 ft 7 1/2 in)
- Positions: Striker; midfielder

Youth career
- 1996: Police FC
- 1997: Tampines Rovers

Senior career*
Years	Team	Apps	(Gls)
1997–1999	Geylang United	40	(15)
1999–2001	SAFFC	19	(3)
2001–2002	Persikabo Bogor	27	(7)
2002–2003	SAFFC	51	(13)
2004–2005	Woodlands Wellington	41	(17)
2006–2007	Johor FA	19	(4)
2006	→ Tampines Rovers (loan)	14	(2)
2007	Woodlands Wellington	13	(5)
2007–2008	PDRM	28	(7)
2008–2010	SAFFC	74	(10)
2011–2012	Tampines Rovers	41	(17)
2013–2014	Tanjong Pagar United	33	(9)
Total		400	(109)

International career
1997–2014	Singapore	43	(8)
- * Club domestic league appearances and goals

Ahmad Latiff bin Khamarudin (born 29 May 1979) is a former professional footballer who last played in the S.League.

He was once touted as a successor to the golden boy Fandi Ahmad, and could play as an attacking midfielder or striker with the help of his playmaking skills. He was very talented and was also capable of playing as a full-back later in his career.

However, due to his consistent bad disciplinary track record for the national team and club sides, he is deemed the 'bad boy' of Singapore football. Ahmad Latiff's various nicknames include the frequently used "bad boy of Singapore football" for his disciplinary problems on and off the pitch, and also "the blond bombshell" in reference to his bleached blond hair.

== Club career ==
=== Youth career ===
Ahmad Latiff started his career at Police FC (now known as Home United) in 1996, before moving to Tampines Rovers Youth Academy the following year.

=== Geylang United ===
Ahmad Latiff moved to Geylang United in 1997 for a first chance of senior football appearance. His performances caught the eyes of several top football coaches in Asia, who were confident that he would be a significant new player in Asian football. However, his disciplinary problems had got the best of him and he failed to live up to the high expectations set for him.

=== SAFFC ===
In 1999, Ahmad Latiff moved to SAFFC where he helped the club win the S.League title the following season.

=== Persikabo Bogor ===
In 2001, Ahmad Latiff made his first career move abroad to Indonesia joining Liga 3 club, Persikabo Bogor.

=== Returned to SAFFC ===
Ahmad Latiff returned to SAFFC in 2002, where he played as a playmaker instead of a striker in which he led the team to the 2002 S.League title victory.

=== Woodlands Wellington ===
In 2004, Ahmad Latiff moved to Woodlands Wellington, but he was unable to capture the blistering form from his days in SAFFC.

=== Johor FA ===
Eventually, in 2006, Ahmad Latif made his move abroad once again to Johor FA, which played in the Malaysian Premier League. He played well for the side along with fellow Singaporean and Lions skipper, Aide Iskandar.

==== Loan to Tampines Rovers ====
After the Malaysian football season ended, he was loaned together with Aide Iskandar to Tampines Rovers for the rest of S.League season.

=== Returned to Woodlands Wellington ===
Prior to the start of the 2007 S.League season, Ahmad Latiff returned to his former club, Woodlands Wellington. He was then appointed as the club captain by the then-manager, Jörg Steinbrunner, and led Woodlands Wellington to their first piece of silverware in their history, the inaugural 2007 Singapore League Cup.

=== Third spell at SAFFC ===
On 2 July 2008, Ahmad Latiff made his return debut for SAFFC in the 2008 S.League. It was his third spell at the club after previously playing for the SAFFC back in 1999 and 2002. Latiff made very important contributions to SAFFC in his third spell, scoring against PSMS Medan in the qualifying round to send the Warriors into the 2009 AFC Champions League group stages for the very first time. On 5 May 2009, he also netted a splendid volley against Shanghai Shenhua in the fifth game of the competition's group stages, helping his team win their first ever point in the AFC Champions League in a 1–1 draw.

=== Tampines Rovers ===
In 2010, Ahmad Latiff moved to Tampines Rovers where he helped them to two consecutive S.League titles in 2011 and 2012. Since returning to the S.League in 2009, he has appeared in 29 Asian Football Confederation matches, with SAFFC in the 2009 AFC Champions League and 2010 AFC Champions League, as well as Tampines Rovers in the 2011 AFC Cup and 2012 AFC Cup, scoring 5 goals in the process.

== International career ==
Ahmad Latiff made his debut for Singapore against Lebanon on 24 May 1997.

In 1998, his sterling performances led Singapore to win the Tiger Cup, the nation's first international trophy, despite getting sent off in the final win against Vietnam. However, due to his poor disciplinary track record, he had been in and out of the Singapore team since the 1998 Tiger Cup win.

Ahmad was recalled to the Singapore in 2006 after his good performances for Johor FA but was axed by coach Raddy Avramovic after he reacted angrily to the coach's decision to substitute him after just 25 minutes during Singapore's Asian Cup qualifying match against Iraq in the United Arab Emirates. Ahmad has never played for Singapore since that incident.

=== Club career statistics ===
As of 4 November 2012

Ahmad Latiff Khamaruddin's Profile

Club Performance		League		Cup		League Cup		Champions League		Total				
Singapore		S.League		Singapore Cup		League Cup		AFC Champions League		Total				
Club	Season	Apps	Goals	Apps	Goals	Apps	Goals	Apps	Goals	Yellow card	(yellow card) (yellow-red card)	Red card	Apps	Goals
SAFFC	2009	22 (3)	5	0	0	0	0	8	2	4	0	1	30 (3)	7
SAFFC	2010	27 (3)	3	1	0	1	0	8	0	9	0	0	37 (3)	3
Tampines Rovers	2011	32	6	3	0	1 (1)	0	7	3	6	0	0	43 (1)	9
Tampines Rovers	2012	15	4	6	2	4	1	6	0	3	0	0	31	7

All numbers encased in brackets signify substitute appearances.
*Tampines Rovers appeared in the AFC Cup in 2011 & 2012.

=== International goals ===
#	Date	Venue	Opponent	Score	Result	Competition
1.	26 August 1998	Hàng Đẫy Stadium, Hanoi, Vietnam	Malaysia	2–0	2–0	1998 Tiger Cup
2.	30 August 1998	Hàng Đẫy Stadium, Hanoi, Vietnam	Laos	2–1	4–1	1998 Tiger Cup
3.	30 August 1998	Hàng Đẫy Stadium, Hanoi, Vietnam	Laos	3–1	4–1	1998 Tiger Cup
4.	4 August 1999	Berakas Sports Complex, Bandar Seri Begawan, Brunei	(Brunei) Laos	3–1	3–1	1999 SEA Games
As of 4 November 2012

== Honours ==
=== Club ===
Singapore Armed Forces

- S.League: 2002, 2008, 2009
- Singapore Cup: 2008

PDRM

- Malaysia Premier League: 2006–07

Tampines Rovers

- S.League: 2011, 2012
- Singapore Cup: 2006

Woodlands Wellington

- Singapore League Cup: 2007

=== International ===
Singapore

- AFF Championship: 1998

=== Individual ===
- SAFFC-Warriors' Player of the Year: 2010

== Videos ==
- youtube.com
