= Jamie Pitt =

Australian soccer player

James Pitt
Personal information
- Full name: James Alan Pitt
- Date of birth: 11 May 1989
- Place of birth: Australia
- Height: 1.83 m (6 ft 0 in)
- Position: Centre-back

Senior career*
Years	Team	Apps	(Gls)
2009	Wollongong Wolves FC		
2009	Balestier Khalsa FC	12	(2)
2013	Palm Beach SC	15	(0)
- * Club domestic league appearances and goals

Jamie Pitt (born 11 May 1989, in Australia) is an Australian soccer player who is last known to have played for Palm Beach SC of the National Premier Leagues Queensland in Australia.

== Balestier Khalsa ==
Arriving as a Prime League player to Singaporean club Balestier Khalsa in June 2009, Pitt scored his second goal for the Tigers in a 5–1 loss to Super Reds FC, with his first in a 2–1 win over Young Lions. Released from Balestier in December that year along with all their foreign players, the Singaporean media proliferated rumours that he was trialling with local team Young Lions but the mover never happened.
