= Theerawekin Seehawong =

Thai footballer (born 1980)

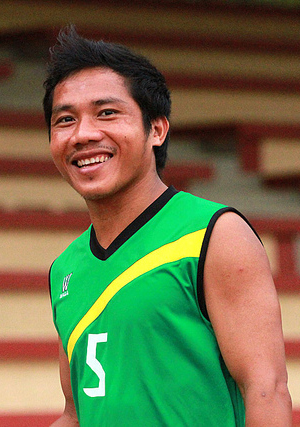
- Theerawekin Seehawong during a training session with Woodlands Wellington in 2013.

Personal information
- Full name: Theerawekin Seehawong
- Date of birth: 6 April 1980 (age 46)
- Place of birth: Loei, Thailand
- Height: 1.67 m (5 ft 5 1/2 in)
- Position: Midfielder

Team information
- Current team: Chanthaburi (head coach)

Senior career*
Years	Team	Apps	(Gls)
2006–2009	Gombak United	19	(4)
2010–2013	Pattaya United	28	(3)
2013	Woodlands Wellington	10	(2)
2014	Angthong	6	(0)
Total		63	(9)

Managerial career
- 2015: Muangthong United (youth)
- 2015: Customs United (assistant)
- 2016–2018: Nongbua Pitchaya
- 2022: Nongbua Pitchaya (caretaker)
- 2023: Nongbua Pitchaya (caretaker)
- 2023–2024: Pattaya United
- 2024: Lampang
- 2025: Chanthaburi
- * Club domestic league appearances and goals as of 16 July 2013

Theerawekin Seehawong (Thai: ธีระเวคิน สีหะวงค์) is a Thai professional football manager and former player.

Seehawong played for Gombak United between 2006 and 2009 and won the Singapore League Cup with the Bulls in 2008, which was incidentally Gombak United's first piece of silverware.

== Club career statistics ==
As of 16 July 2013

Theerawekin Seehawong's Profile

Club Performance		League		Cup		League Cup		Total				
Singapore		S.League		Singapore Cup		League Cup		Total				
Club	Season	Apps	Goals	Apps	Goals	Apps	Goals	Yellow card	(yellow card) (yellow-red card)	Red card	Apps	Goals
Gombak United	2009	19	1	0	0	0	0	5	0	0	19	1
Thailand		Thai Premier League		FA Cup		League Cup						
Club	Season	Apps	Goals	Apps	Goals	Apps	Goals	Yellow card	(yellow card) (yellow-red card)	Red card	Apps	Goals
Pattaya United F.C.	2010	0	0	0	0	0	0	0	0	0	0	0
Pattaya United F.C.	2011	0	0	0	0	0	0	0	0	0	0	0
Pattaya United F.C.	2012	0	0	0	0	0	0	0	0	0	0	0
Pattaya United F.C.	2013	1 (6)	0	0	0	0	0	2	0	0	1 (6)	0
Singapore		S.League		Singapore Cup		League Cup						
Club	Season	Apps	Goals	Apps	Goals	Apps	Goals	Yellow card	(yellow card) (yellow-red card)	Red card	Apps	Goals
Woodlands Wellington	2013	3	2	0	0	0	0	0	0	0	3	2

Records start from 2009 to the present. All numbers encased in brackets signify substitute appearances.

== Managerial statistics ==
As of match played 9 November 2025

Managerial record by team and tenure
Team	From	To	Record				
Team	From	To	P	W	D	L	Win %
Nongbua Pitchaya	1 January 2016	30 November 2018	6	2	1	3	33.33
Nongbua Pitchaya	2 November 2022	8 December 2022	7	3	4	0	42.86
Nongbua Pitchaya	23 February 2023	31 May 2023	10	3	1	6	30.00
Pattaya United	12 October 2023	17 September 2024	26	7	10	9	26.92
Chanthaburi	19 February 2025	9 November 2025	24	9	5	10	37.50
Total			73	24	21	28	32.88

== Honours ==
Gombak United

- Singapore League Cup: 2008
