= Yoo Hyun-goo =

South Korean footballer (born 1983)

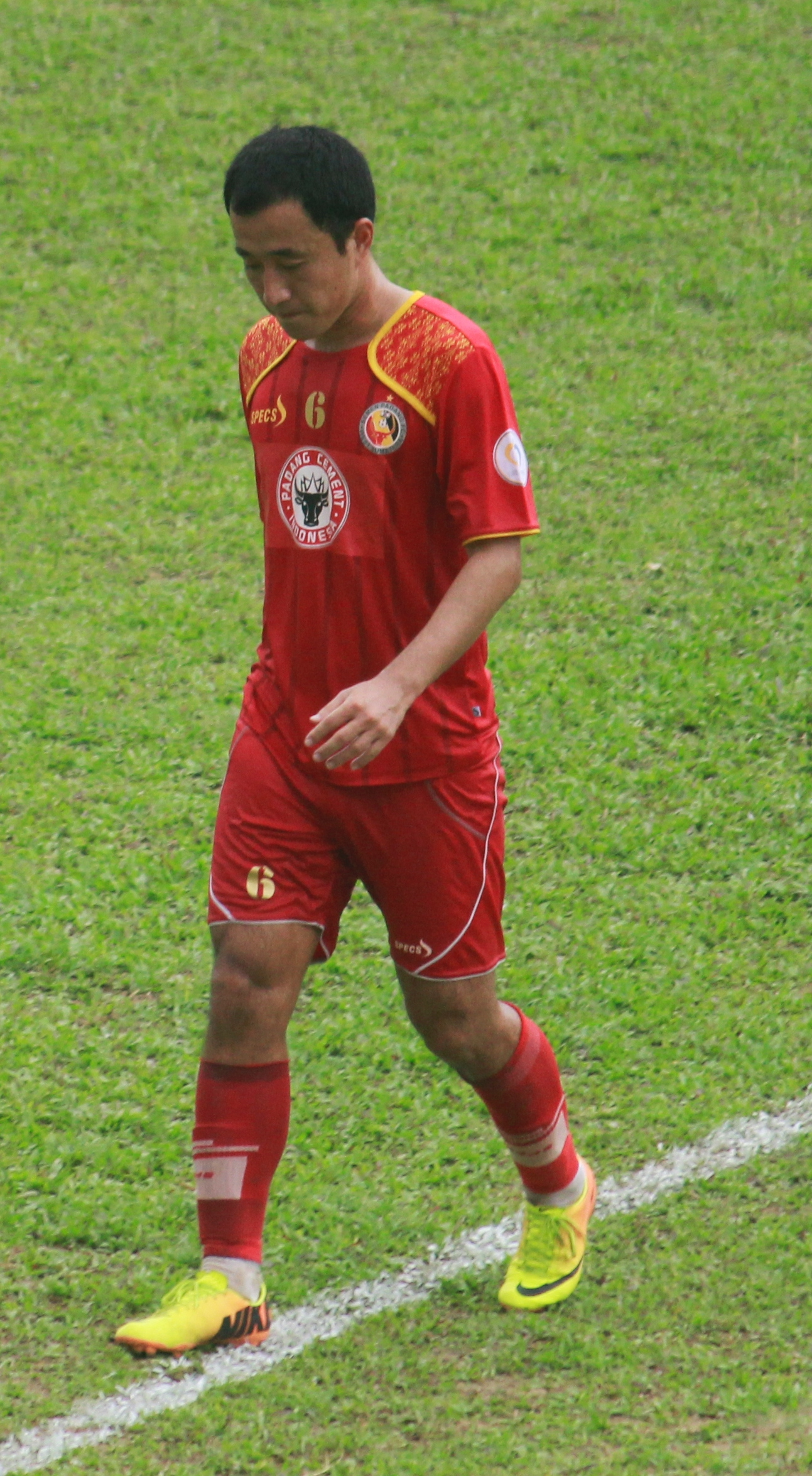
- Yoo playing for Semen Padang in 2013

Personal information
- Full name: Yoo Hyun-goo (유현구)
- Date of birth: 25 January 1983 (age 43)
- Place of birth: Daegu, South Korea
- Height: 1.71 m (5 ft 7 in)
- Position: Defensive midfielder

Senior career*
Years	Team	Apps	(Gls)
2001–2004	Pohang Steelers	0	(0)
2005–2008	Bucheon SK	14	(1)
2007–2008	→ Gwangju Sangmu (loan)	20	(1)
2009–2010	Super Reds	28	(5)
2010–2016	Semen Padang	60	(4)
2015	→ Sriwijaya (loan)	0	(0)
2016–2018	Sriwijaya	91	(0)
2019	Kalteng Putra	11	(0)
2019–2020	Semen Padang	17	(0)
2021	Muba Babel United	0	(0)
2021	Persis Solo	7	(0)
2022	Barito Putera	3	(0)
2022	Sriwijaya	4	(0)
Total		255	(11)
- * Club domestic league appearances and goals

Yoo Hyun-goo (Korean: 유현구 born 25 January 1983) is a South Korean former professional footballer who plays as a defensive midfielder. He previously played for Pohang Steelers, Bucheon SK, Jeju United, Gwangju Sangmu, Super Reds, Barito Putera, Kalteng Putra, and Semen Padang.

== Career ==
=== Sriwijaya ===
Yoo joined Sriwijaya for the 2016 season. Yoo made his debut against Persib Bandung in the first week of 2016 Indonesia Soccer Championship A.

== Personal life ==
Born and raised in South Korea, he acquired Indonesian citizenship in 2021.

== Career statistics ==
Club performances			League		Cup		League Cup		Continental		Other		Total	
Season	Club	League	Apps	Goals	Apps	Goals	Apps	Goals	Apps	Goals	Apps	Goals	Apps	Goals
2001	Pohang Steelers	K-League	0	0	—		0	0	—		—		0	0
2002	Pohang Steelers	K-League	0	0	—		0	0	—		—		0	0
2003	Pohang Steelers	K-League	0	0	0	0	—		—		—		0	0
2004	Pohang Steelers	K-League	0	0	0	0	0	0	—		—		0	0
2005	Bucheon SK	K-League	7	0	2	0	0	0	—		—		9	0
2006	Jeju United	K-League	7	1	0	0	4	0	—		—		11	1
2007	Gwangju Sangmu (loan)	K-League	15	0	1	0	4	0	—		—		20	0
2008	Gwangju Sangmu (loan)	K-League	5	1	0	0	2	0	—		—		7	1
2009	Super Reds	S.League	28	5	0	0	0	0	—		—		28	5
2011-12	Semen Padang	Indonesia Premier League	27	2	—		—		—		—		27	2
2013	Semen Padang	Indonesia Premier League	14	1	—		—		7	0	1	0	22	1
2014	Semen Padang	Indonesia Super League	17	1	2	0	—		—		—		19	1
2015	Semen Padang	Indonesia Super League	2	0	—		—		—		—		2	0
2015	Sriwijaya (loan)	No League	—		7	0	—		—		—		7	0
2016	Sriwijaya	ISC A	28	0	—		—		—		—		28	0
2017	Sriwijaya	Liga 1	32	0	—		—		—		—		32	0
2018	Sriwijaya	Liga 1	31	0	—		—		—		—		31	0
2019	Kalteng Putra	Liga 1	11	0	0	0	0	0	—		—		11	0
2019	Semen Padang	Liga 1	17	0	0	0	0	0	—		—		17	0
2021	Muba Babel United	Liga 2	0	0	0	0	0	0	—		—		0	0
2021	Persis Solo	Liga 2	7	0	0	0	0	0	—		—		7	0
2021-22	Barito Putera	Liga 1	3	0	0	0	0	0	—		—		3	0
2022-23	Sriwijaya	Liga 2	4	0	0	0	0	0	—		—		4	0
Career total			255	11	12	0	10	0	7	0	1	0	285	11

== Honours ==
=== Club ===
Semen Padang

- Indonesia Premier League: 2011–12
- Indonesian Community Shield: 2013

Sriwijaya

- President's Cup third place: 2018
- East Kalimantan Governor Cup: 2018

Persis Solo

- Liga 2: 2021
