= Ludovick Takam =

Cameroonian footballer

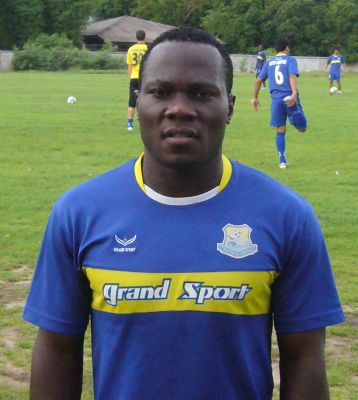

Personal information
- Full name: Kengne Ludovick Takam
- Date of birth: 21 June 1983 (age 43)
- Place of birth: Yaounde, Cameroon
- Height: 1.64 m (5 ft 4 1/2 in)
- Position: Striker

Senior career*
Years	Team	Apps	(Gls)
2005–2006	Balestier Khalsa	53	(51)
2007–2009	Home United	32	(19)
2010–2012	Pattaya United	55	(21)
2012	Chonburi	11	(2)
2012	Pattaya United	17	(10)
2012–2013	Police United	6	(0)
2013	Phuket	14	(5)
2014	Navy	28	(13)
2015	Krabi	16	(2)
2016	Ayutthaya	7	(3)
2016–2017	Kopoon Warrior	6	(2)
Total		245	(128)
- * Club domestic league appearances and goals

Kengne Ludovick Takam (born 21 June 1983) is a Cameroonian former professional footballer.

== Career ==
Ludovick played for Balestier Khalsa during 2005–2007 season before joining Home United in 2008.

He helped Balestier Khalsa to be the team with biggest improvement in 2005 which bring them to 7th place out of 11 and also shock the fans with a victory over Tampines Rovers with a scoreline of 2–1 with both goals scored by him.

With a good pair up with Osagie Ederaro, he managed to score 44 league goals in 2 seasons at Balestier Khalsa and he scored 23 goals in his debut season with Home United in 2008.

He was the top goalscorer in the 2010 Thai Premier League campaign by scoring 17 goals for Pattaya United F.C.

== Honours ==
=== Individual ===
- S.League Young Player of the Year: 2006
- S.League People Choice Award: 2008
- S.League 100 Goal: 2009
- Thai Premier League Player of the Month: July 2010
- Thai Premier League Golden Boot: 2010
