= Jeon Kyung-jun =

South Korean footballer (born 1973)

Jeon Kyung-jun 전경준
Personal information
- Date of birth: September 10, 1973 (age 53)
- Place of birth: Seoul, South Korea
- Height: 1.78 m (5 ft 10 in)
- Position: Midfielder

Youth career
- Kyungil University

Senior career*
Years	Team	Apps	(Gls)
1992–1999	Pohang Steelers	103	(8)
1999–2001	Bucheon SK	53	(9)
2002–2005	Jeonbuk Hyundai Motors	60	(6)
2006	Home United	25	(13)
2007	DPMM FC		

International career
1993	South Korea U-20	2	(0)
1995–1996	South Korea U-23	7	(0)

Managerial career
- 2008–2010: Super Reds
- 2012: South Korea U-17 (assistant)
- 2013–2014: South Korea U-14
- 2015: Jeju United (assistant)
- 2015–2016: South Korea U-23 (assistant)
- 2017: South Korea U-20 (assistant)
- 2017–2018: South Korea (assistant)
- 2019: Jeonnam Dragons (interim manager)
- 2020–2022: Jeonnam Dragons
Korean name
Hangul	전경준
Hanja	全慶埈
RR	Jeon Gyeongjun
MR	Chŏn Kyŏngjun
- * Club domestic league appearances and goals

Jeon Kyung-jun (Korean: 전경준; born 10 September 1973) is a former footballer from South Korea. He played as midfielder.

== Career ==
Jeon has represented South Korea both at the youth (U-20) and Olympic (U-23) levels. At club level, he initially enjoyed more international successes (winning the Asian Champions Cup in 1997 and 1998 with Pohang Steelers). However, Jeonbuk Hyundai Motors did win two FA Cups (2003, 2005) despite average form in the league.

In 2006, Jeon left Jeonbuk to play for Home United in Singapore. The Protectors managed a fourth-placed finish in the S.League, and Jeon scored 13 goals.

He joined the Bruneian club DPMM FC for the 2007 Malaysian Super League season, but only stayed a year before returning to Singapore as a player-coach for the Super Reds. He successfully led the team to an impressive runners-up finish in the 2008 season, two points below champions SAFFC.

Under Jeon, the Super Reds have been known to play a brand of quick-paced football with effective short passes. In 2019, he replaced Fabiano as manager of Jeonnam Dragons in K League 2. He has resigned from the position on 5 June 2022.
