= Dražen Gović =

Croatian footballer (1981–2022)

Personal information
- Date of birth: 29 April 1981
- Place of birth: Šibenik, SR Croatia, SFR Yugoslavia
- Date of death: 16 February 2022 (aged 40)
- Place of death: Šibenik, Croatia
- Position: Midfielder

Youth career
- Hajduk Split

Senior career*
Years	Team	Apps	(Gls)
2000–2002	Mosor		
2002–2004	Zadar	8	(0)
2004–2007	Šibenik	83	(21)
2007–2008	Mouscron	3	(0)
2008–2009	Šibenik	26	(7)
2009–2010	Brunei DPMM	8	(2)
2010	Brantford Galaxy		
2010	Šibenik	12	(0)
2013	Šibenik	9	(0)
Total		141	(30)
- * Club domestic league appearances and goals

Dražen Gović (29 April 1981 – 16 February 2022) was a Croatian professional footballer who played as a midfielder.

== Club career ==
Gović began his career in 2000 with NK Mosor in the Croatian Second Football League. In 2002, he played in the highest level of football in Croatia in the Croatian First Football League with NK Zadar. In 2004, he signed with HNK Šibenik and played a total of 63 matches and recorded 12 goals. He had a stint with R.E. Mouscron in Belgium, and went overseas to play with Brunei DPMM FC in the S.League. In 2010, he went to Canada to sign with Brantford Galaxy of the Canadian Soccer League. On 5 July 2010, he was transferred back to Šibenik in order to assist the club in their UEFA Europa League run.

== Personal life and death ==
He died in a car accident near Šibenik on 16 February 2022, at the age of 40.
