= Oh Ddog-yi =

South Korean footballer

Oh Ddog-Yi
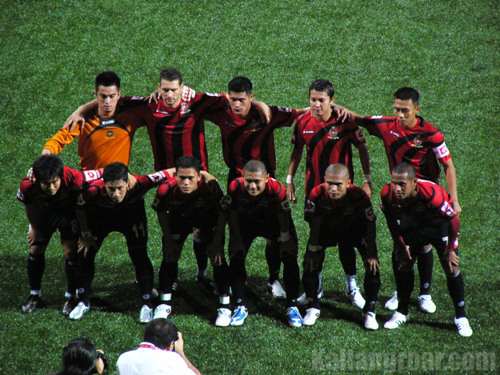
- Oh Ddog-Yi (bottom first left) with DPMM during the 2009 Singapore League Cup

Personal information
- Full name: Oh Ddog-Yi
- Date of birth: June 1, 1984 (age 42)
- Place of birth: South Korea
- Height: 1.68 m (5 ft 6 in)
- Position: Striker

Senior career*
Years	Team	Apps	(Gls)
2005	Ulsan Hyundai Mipo	0	(0)
2006	FC Sibir Novosibirsk	3	(0)
2007	Ulsan Hyundai Mipo	6	(2)
2008	Super Reds	23	(12)
2009	Mohammedan SC		
2009	DPMM FC	16	(2)
2009	Balestier Khalsa	6	(1)
- * Club domestic league appearances and goals

Oh Ddog-Yi (Korean: 오똑이, born June 1, 1984) is a retired South Korean professional footballer who played for different clubs in South Korea, Russia, Bangladesh, Singapore, India.

== Career ==
Prior to joining Super Reds FC in 2008 he played for Ulsan Hyundai Mipo Dockyard in the Korea National League and FC Sibir Novosibirsk in the Russian First Division. He joined Brunei DPMM FC in 2009 but left a few months later to join Balestier Khalsa.
