= Itamar Rangel =

Brazilian footballer (born 1986)

Personal information
- Full name: Itamar Soares Rangel
- Date of birth: 3 May 1986 (age 40)
- Place of birth: Rio de Janeiro, Brazil
- Height: 1.79 m (5 ft 10 in)
- Position: Midfielder

Senior career*
Years	Team	Apps	(Gls)
- PSM Makassar
2008–2009	Balestier Khalsa FC	11	(2)
- Clube Náutico Capibaribe
- * Club domestic league appearances and goals

Itamar Soares Rangel (born 3 May 1986) is a Brazilian former professional footballer.

== Career ==
=== Indonesia ===
Adjusting quickly to the Indonesian culture when joining PSM Makassar, Rangel was not used to the cacophonous support at stadiums during games and had to return to Brazil for injury.

=== Singapore ===
Inking a deal with Balestier Khalsa of the local S.League, the Brazilian midfielder mixed with another Brazilian and a Chilean. There, he attracted the interest of Clube Náutico Capibaribe back in Brazil, later moving there and scoring on his debut.
