= Bangaly =

Bangaly is both a given name and a surname. Notable people with the name include:

- Bangaly Fofana (born 1989), French basketball player
- Bangaly Kaba (born 1959), French basketball player
- Soumahoro Bangaly (born 1991), Ivorian footballer
- Fodé Bangaly Diakité (born 1985), Ivorian footballer
