= Hiroyuki Yamamoto (footballer) =

Japanese footballer

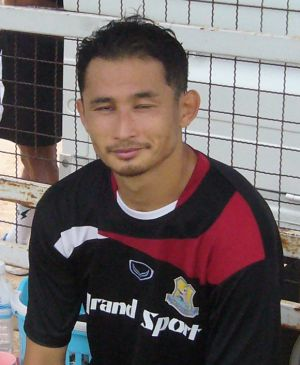

Personal information
- Full name: Hiroyuki Yamamoto
- Date of birth: October 27, 1979 (age 47)
- Place of birth: Niigata, Japan
- Height: 1.78 m (5 ft 10 in)
- Position: Defender

Senior career*
Years	Team	Apps	(Gls)
1998–2001	Tokyo University of Agriculture		
2002–2004	ALO's Hokuriku	59	(4)
2005–2006	Albirex Niigata (Singapore)	53	(8)
2007	Valiente Toyama	10	(0)
2008–2009	Sengkang Punggol	56	(3)
2010	TTM Phichit	27	(0)
2011	Pattaya United		
2012–2013	Osotspa Saraburi		
- * Club domestic league appearances and goals as of May 21, 2008

Hiroyuki Yamamoto (山本 寛幸, Yamamoto Hiroyuki; born October 27, 1979) is a Japanese former footballer who played as a defender.
