= Shukor Zailan =

Singaporean footballer

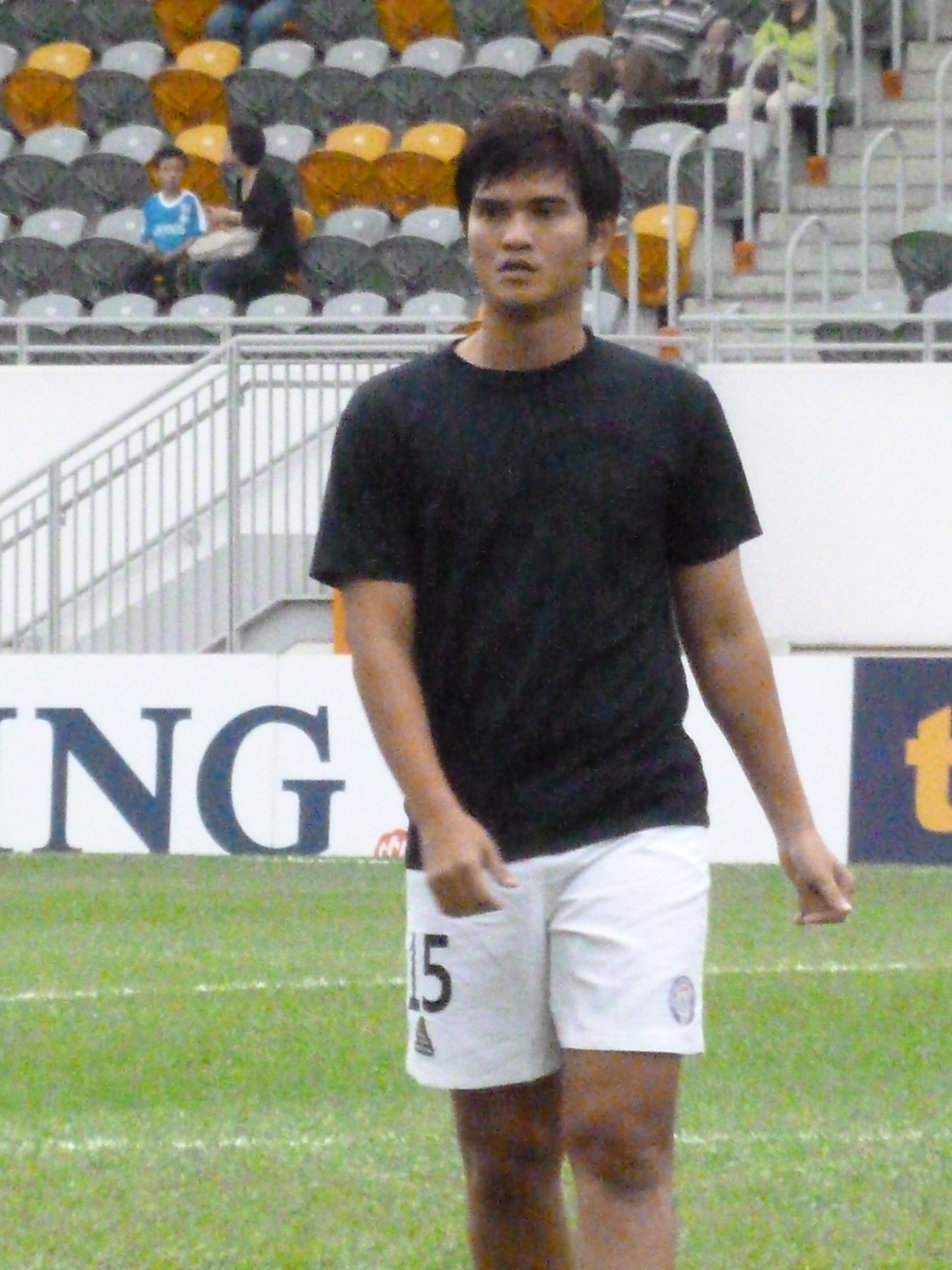

Personal information
- Full name: Shukor bin Zailan
- Date of birth: 8 December 1985 (age 40)
- Place of birth: Singapore
- Height: 1.79 m (5 ft 10 1/2 in)
- Position: Midfielder

Senior career*
Years	Team	Apps	(Gls)
2003–2004	Sembawang Rangers	8	(0)
2005	Paya Lebar Punggol	15	(0)
2005–2007	Young Lions	27	(1)
2008	Home United	8	(1)
2009–2011	Tampines Rovers	24	(1)
2012–2016	Warriors	95	(3)

International career
2010–2016	Singapore	2	(0)
- * Club domestic league appearances and goals as of 31 December 2009

Shukor bin Zailan (born 8 December 1985) is a retired Singaporean footballer who last played as a midfielder for S.League club Warriors. He is a natural playmaker.

He has previously played for S.League clubs Sembawang Rangers, Paya Lebar Punggol, Young Lions and Home United. He was previously Head Coach of COE team Warriors U13 and U14. In 2016, he made the switch and is the current coach of Hougang United U15
