= Choi Dong-soo (footballer) =

South Korean footballer (born 1985)

Personal information
- Full name: Choi Dong-soo
- Date of birth: 29 January 1985 (age 41)
- Place of birth: South Korea
- Height: 1.71 m (5 ft 7 1/2 in)
- Position: Forward

Senior career*
Years	Team	Apps	(Gls)
2007–2009	Super Reds	37	(26)
2010–2011	Persisam Putra Samarinda	38	(7)
2011–2012	PSMS Medan (ISL)	15	(6)
2012–2013	Persipura Jayapura	14	(2)
- * Club domestic league appearances and goals as of 3 July 2012

Choi Dong-soo (born 29 January 1985) is a South Korean footballer who last played as a forward for PSMS Medan (ISL).
