= Akira Takase =

Japanese footballer

Personal information
- Full name: Akira Takase
- Date of birth: 21 September 1988 (age 38)
- Place of birth: Kitami, Hokkaido, Japan
- Height: 1.71 m (5 ft 7 in)
- Position: Midfielder

Team information
- Current team: ReinMeer Aomori
- Number: 8

Youth career
- 2004–2006: Obihiro Kita High School

Senior career*
Years	Team	Apps	(Gls)
2007–2009	Albirex Niigata Singapore		
2010–2011	Japan Soccer College	26	(11)
2012–2016	Grulla Morioka	79	(25)
2016	Azul Claro Numazu	2	(0)
2017–	ReinMeer Aomori	18	(0)
- * Club domestic league appearances and goals as of 23 February 2018

Akira Takase (高瀬証, Takase, Akira; born 21 September 1988 in Kitami, Hokkaido) is a Japanese footballer who plays for ReinMeer Aomori.

== Club statistics ==
Updated to 23 February 2018.

Club performance			League		Cup		Total	
Season	Club	League	Apps	Goals	Apps	Goals	Apps	Goals
Japan			League		Emperor's Cup		Total	
2010	Japan Soccer College	JRL (Hokushin'etsu, Div. 1)	12	6	1	0	13	6
2011	Japan Soccer College	JRL (Hokushin'etsu, Div. 1)	14	5	1	0	15	5
2012	Grulla Morioka	JRL (Tohoku, Div. 1)	11	6	1	0	12	6
2013	Grulla Morioka	JRL (Tohoku, Div. 1)	18	11	1	0	19	11
2014	Grulla Morioka	J3 League	32	7	1	0	33	7
2015	Grulla Morioka	J3 League	18	1	0	0	18	1
2016	Grulla Morioka	J3 League	0	0	–		0	0
2016	Azul Claro Numazu	JFL	2	0	–		2	0
2017	ReinMeer Aomori	JFL	18	0	–		18	0
Career total			125	36	5	0	130	36
