= Jeon Byung-guk =

South Korean footballer

Byung-Euk
Personal information
- Full name: Jeon Byung-Guk
- Date of birth: 19 August 1987 (age 39)
- Place of birth: South Korea
- Height: 1.78 m (5 ft 10 in)
- Position: Midfielder

Team information
- Current team: Geylang United FC

Senior career*
Years	Team	Apps	(Gls)
2008–2009	Super Reds	29	(6)
2009–2010	Persebaya Surabaya	9	(1)
2011	Geylang United	13	(2)
- * Club domestic league appearances and goals as of 31 October 2011

- Jeon Byung-guk
- Hangul: 전병국
- RR: Jeon Byeongguk
- MR: Chŏn Pyŏngguk

Jeon Byung-Guk (Korean: 전병국; sometimes romanised as Jeon Byung-Uk; born August 19, 1987) is a South Korean former footballer that played for Geylang United FC in the S.League. Together with former teammate Kim Jae-Hong he was sentenced to jail in 2012 for attempted match fixing involving his former team.
