= O. J. Obatola =

Nigerian footballer

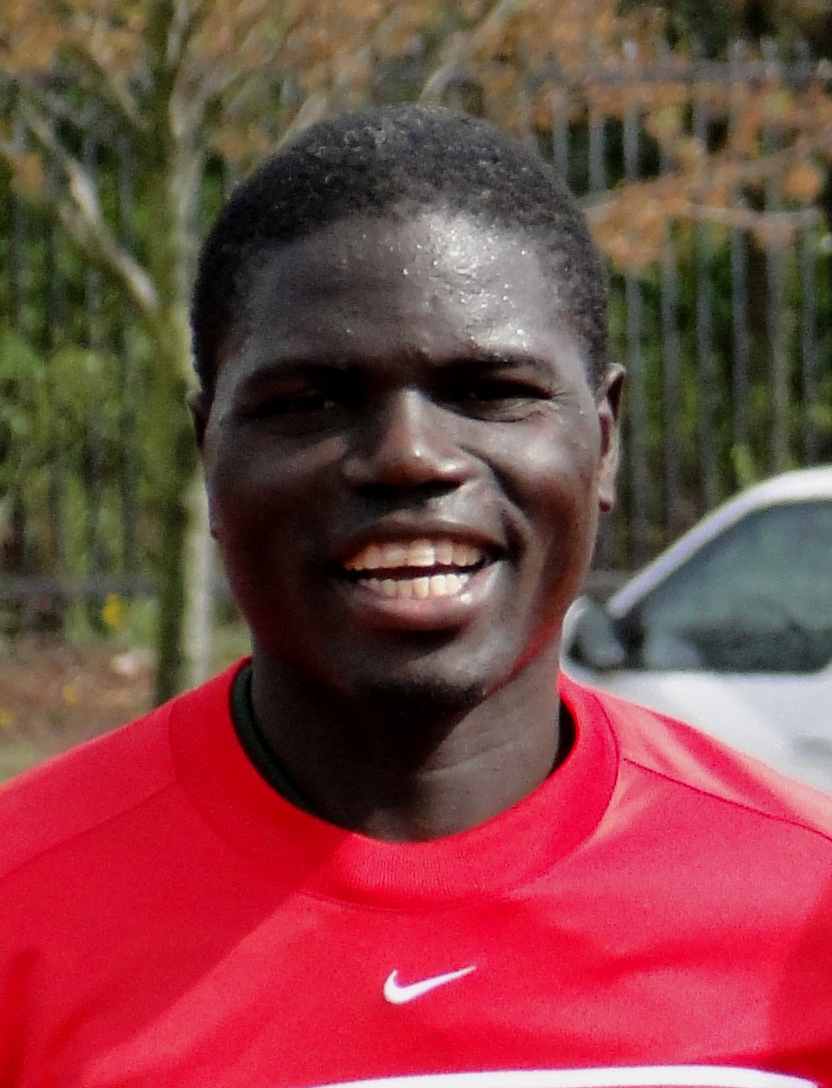

Personal information
- Full name: Ojimi Gabriel Obatola
- Date of birth: October 24, 1987 (age 39)
- Place of birth: Lagos, Nigeria
- Height: 6 ft 0 in (1.83 m)
- Position: Forward

Senior career*
Years	Team	Apps	(Gls)
2006 – 2009	Gombak United	117	(62)
2010	Portland Timbers	6	(1)
2011–2012	Pattaya United	53	(14)
2013	Salgaocar	10	(6)
2014	Ang Thong	4	(3)
2014	Looktabfah	8	(5)
2015	Osotspa	10	(6)
2015	Sisaket	9	(5)
2016	Atlanta Silverbacks	15	(10)
2017–2018	SGFC Eagles Maryland	15	(11)
- * Club domestic league appearances and goals as of August 25, 2017

Ojimi Gabriel "O.J." Obatola(born October 24, 1987, in Lagos, Nigeria) is a Nigerian professional footballer who plays as a forward. He currently is a free agent.

== Career ==
Obatola began his career with Gombak United in the Singaporean S-League in 2006, and spent the next five years with the club, making over 100 appearances. He helped Gombak win the Singapore League Cup 2008, and he was named S-League Young Player of the Year in 2009

On April 7, 2010, Obatola signed the Portland Timbers of the USSF D-2 Pro League, having impressed the team's coaches during a trial period during which he scored the winning goal in a friendly game against Seattle Sounders FC, making him a fan favorite. However, after starting six of the first seven games of the 2010 season and scoring just one goal, Obatola did not feature in the next four matches and was released from his contract by mutual consent on June 10, 2010. He signed for Pattaya United of Thailand in February 2011 and scored his first goal for the team with a header in his first start on April 16, 2011. In January 2013 Obatola signed for Salgaocar until 2012-13 I-League season.

Obatola last debut played in Sisaket after completing his contract brought him to continue his trade in the United States with recently American Soccer League expansion team in Maryland. The Former Sisaket FC Forward, Gabriel Obatola decided to continue his career with SGFC Eagles Maryland.

On 2 January 2017 it was announced that Obatola has successfully signed and is currently playing with Maryland-based professional soccer team SGFC Eagles for 2017 Season which features in the American Soccer League. The American Soccer League (ASL) is seeking provisional D-3 in USSF pyramid. The league that provides American soccer players with professional playing opportunities as well as career network path into the major soccer leagues around the world. The SGFC Eagles Maryland has won all the championships as well as State Cup that qualifies them to feature in Lamar Hunt US Open Cup in 2013 in the northeast of America before being drafted by the American Professional Soccer league.

== Honors ==
Gombak United

- Singapore League Cup: 2008

Individual

- S. League Young Player of the Year: 2009
- S. League People's Choice Award: 2009
