= Seth Galloway =

American soccer player (born 1987)

Personal information
- Full name: Seth Jordan Galloway
- Date of birth: January 12, 1987 (age 39)
- Place of birth: Evansville, Indiana, U.S.
- Height: 1.88 m (6 ft 2 in)
- Position: Defender

Youth career
- 2003–2004: Dalat International School
- 2005–2008: Nyack Warriors

Senior career*
Years	Team	Apps	(Gls)
2004	Chinese Recreational Club	8	(1)
2005	JYSA United	22	(6)
2006–2008	Chicago Eagles	31	(2)
2009	Balestier Khalsa FC	10	(1)

International career
2009	American	1	(0)
- * Club domestic league appearances and goals

Seth Jordan Galloway (born January 12, 1987) is an American association football player who plays as a defender.

== Career ==
Galloway began his career with Dalat International School and joined in 2004 to Malaysia who signed for Chinese Recreational Club in Penang. In 2005 attended to studies to the Nyack College and played for the Warrior's soccer team. Galloway played besides his studying at the Nyack College 2005 for JYSA United in Louisville, Kentucky and for Chicago Eagles from 2005 to 2008. He signed in April 2009 for Balestier Khalsa FC and was two months later on 9 June 2009 released.
