= Kim Yoon-sik =

South Korean footballer (born 1984)

Personal information
- Full name: Kim Yoon-sik
- Date of birth: 29 January 1984 (age 42)
- Place of birth: South Korea
- Height: 1.86 m (6 ft 1 in)
- Position: Forward

Senior career*
| Years | Team | Apps | (Gls) |
| 2006–2008 | Pohang Steelers | 37 | (0) |
| 2009–2010 | Super Reds | 26 | (4) |
| 2011 | Daejeon KHNP | 25 | (6) |
- * Club domestic league appearances and goals

Kim Yoon-sik (born 29 January 1984) is a South Korea footballer.

Kim previously played for Pohang Steelers in the K-League, S-League side Super Reds FC and Daejeon KHNP in the Korea National League.
