= Kingsley Njoku =

Nigerian footballer (born 1986)

Personal information
- Full name: Kingsley Metu Njoku
- Date of birth: 18 August 1986 (age 40)
- Place of birth: Lagos, Nigeria
- Height: 1.82 m (6 ft 0 in)
- Position: Striker

Senior career*
Years	Team	Apps	(Gls)
2007–2010	Gombak United FC		
2010–2013	Phnom Penh Crown FC		
2014–2015	Preston Lions FC	38	(19)
2017	Lalor United	10	(13)
- * Club domestic league appearances and goals

Kingsley Njoku (born 18 August 1986 in Lagos, Nigeria) is a Nigerian footballer who last played for Lalor United of the Australian Men's State League 4 North.

== Career ==
=== Singapore ===
Clinching the 2008 Singapore League Cup trophy with Gombak United of the Singapore S.League, Njoku tried out for Norwegian side Lyn Oslo that year before re-joining Gombak United in March 2009 and netting a goal in a 1–0 win over Young Lions upon returning. However, because of a situation regarding his marriage in Nigeria, which had deleterious effects on his mental health, the striker was dropped from the Gombak United roster in early 2010.

=== Cambodia ===
Announced as one of Cambodian outfit Phnom Penh Crown's new signings in late 2010, Njoku donned the number 20 jersey, scoring the winning goal to help Crown list the 2011 Cambodian League title and finishing that season with 10 goals in the league and 4 before the final of the 2011 AFC President's Cup. He then stayed with Phnom Penh Crown for 2012, missing the first half of the season on account of being suspended by the AFC.

In 2011, Njoku scored 5 goals in a friendly game opposing Asia Euro University that ended 10–1 in favor of Crown; that year, he also scored the opening goal 12 seconds into the match, in a 4–0 triumph over Prek Pra Keila.

He is an Igbo, an ethnic group ubiquitous in southern Nigeria.
