= Bryan Soane =

Australian soccer player

Personal information
- Full name: Bryan Andrew Soane
- Date of birth: 11 July 1988 (age 38)
- Place of birth: Penrith, New South Wales, Australia
- Height: 1.93 m (6 ft 4 in)
- Position: Forward

Youth career
- Emu Plains FC
- Penrith Panthers
- Bankstown City FC
- Blacktown City FC
- 2005: Sydney Wanderers FC
- Blacktown Spartans FC

Senior career*
Years	Team	Apps	(Gls)
2006	Blacktown Spartans FC		
2007–2008	Sydney Wanderers FC	47	(21)
2009	Balestier Khalsa FC	13	(3)
2014	Blacktown Spartans FC		
2015	Mt Druitt Town Rangers FC	21	(2)
- * Club domestic league appearances and goals

Bryan Andrew Soane (born 11 July 1988) is an Australian footballer.

== Youth ==
Hailing from the Penrith area, he played for Emu Plains FC from their Under-sixes through to the Under-11s. Picked as a representative player for the Penrith Panthers' youth team, he played in their Under-12, Under-13 and Under-14 teams. Next he moved to Bankstown City FC, featuring in their Under-15 side and was even selected for their squad travelling to Spain where they played opposition such as Real Madrid Youth. Later, he joined Blacktown City FC, performing with their Under-16, Under-17 and Under-18 sides.

== Career ==
=== NPL NSW ===
Mostly known for being a proficient goal-scorer with Sydney Wanderers FC, he scored 21 goals in 47 appearances in two seasons, claiming the 2007 Player of the Year and top scorer of his club. Well-traveled coach John Stewart Porter acknowledged his shooting ability stating that he 'had a tremendous hot' and that 'he has very impressive physique, works very hard at all aspects of the game, and can play well anywhere up front'. Soane returned to his youth club Blacktown Spartans FC in 2014 and was one of six players from the Penrith and Blue Mountains area.

=== S.League ===
Quitting his job to play professionally in the S.League with Balestier Khalsa FC, he began a meticulous daily training routine. Aiming to play in the A-League, the Australian top division, he saw the S.League as a stepping-stone to that target, quitting Balestier a month before the expiry of his contract in June 2009 after claiming 'mistreatment' form the club.
