= Ham Hyeong-kyu =

South Korean footballer

Ham Hyeong Kyu
Personal information
- Full name: Ham Hyeong Kyu
- Date of birth: 5 May 1986 (age 40)
- Place of birth: South Korea
- Height: 1.82 m (5 ft 11 1/2 in)
- Position: Forward

Senior career*
| Years | Team | Apps | (Gls) |
| 2009 | Home United FC | 21 | (7) |
| 2010 | Persela Lamongan | 18 | (1) |
| 2010–2011 | PS Bengkulu | 25 | (3) |
- * Club domestic league appearances and goals as of 17:23, 16 February 2010 (UTC+7)

Ham Hyeong Kyu (born 5 May 1986) is a South Korean former footballer who played as a forward.
