= Ryota Doi =

Japanese footballer

Personal information
- Date of birth: August 27, 1987 (age 39)
- Place of birth: Sumoto, Hyōgo, Japan
- Height: 1.90 m (6 ft 3 in)
- Position: Striker

Team information
- Current team: Fujieda MYFC
- Number: 9

Youth career
- 2003–2005: Kobe Koryo Gakuen; High School

Senior career*
| Years | Team | Apps | (Gls) |
| 2006–2007 | Vissel Kobe | 2 | (0) |
| 2008 | Albirex Niigata Singapore | 30 | (12) |
| 2009–2010 | Japan Soccer College | 22 | (20) |
| 2011 | Arte Takasaki | 25 | (9) |
| 2012 | Thespa Kusatsu | 18 | (0) |
| 2013–2014 | Grulla Morioka | 42 | (18) |
| 2015 | Nagano Parceiro | 19 | (1) |
| 2016 | Grulla Morioka | 14 | (1) |
| 2017– | Fujieda MYFC | | |
- * Club domestic league appearances and goals as of 23 February 2017

Ryota Doi (土井 良太, born August 27, 1987) is a Japanese football player for Fujieda MYFC.

== Club career statistics ==
Updated to 23 February 2017.

| Club performance | | | League | | Cup | | League Cup | | Total | |
| Season | Club | League | Apps | Goals | Apps | Goals | Apps | Goals | Apps | Goals |
| Japan | | | League | | Emperor's Cup | | J. League Cup | | Total | |
|---|---|---|---|---|---|---|---|---|---|---|
| 2006 | Vissel Kobe | J2 League | 0 | 0 | 0 | 0 | - | | 0 | 0 |
| 2007 | Vissel Kobe | J1 League | 2 | 0 | 0 | 0 | 0 | 0 | 2 | 0 |
| Singapore | | | League | | Singapore Cup | | League Cup | | Total | |
| 2008 | Albirex Niigata Singapore | S. League | 30 | 12 | 3 | 2 | - | | 33 | 14 |
| Japan | | | League | | Emperor's Cup | | J. League Cup | | Total | |
| 2009 | Japan Soccer College | JRL | 12 | 5 | 1 | 0 | - | | 13 | 5 |
| 2010 | Japan Soccer College | JRL | 10 | 15 | 1 | 0 | - | | 11 | 15 |
| 2011 | Arte Takasaki | JFL | 25 | 9 | 2 | 1 | - | | 27 | 10 |
| 2012 | Thespa Kusatsu | J2 League | 18 | 0 | 1 | 0 | - | | 19 | 0 |
| 2013 | Grulla Morioka | JRL (Tohoku) | 10 | 6 | 1 | 0 | - | | 11 | 6 |
| 2014 | Grulla Morioka | J3 League | 32 | 12 | 1 | 0 | - | | 33 | 12 |
| 2015 | Nagano Parceiro | J3 League | 19 | 1 | 0 | 0 | - | | 19 | 1 |
| 2016 | Grulla Morioka | J3 League | 14 | 1 | 0 | 0 | - | | 14 | 1 |
| Country | Japan | | 122 | 49 | 8 | 1 | 0 | 0 | 130 | 50 |
| Country | Singapore | | 30 | 12 | 3 | 2 | - | | 33 | 14 |
| Total | | | 152 | 61 | 11 | 3 | 0 | 0 | 163 | 64 |
