= Lloyd Butler (footballer) =

English footballer

Personal information
- Full name: Lloyd Anthony Butler
- Date of birth: 13 February 1989 (age 37)
- Place of birth: Grays, England
- Position: Centre forward

Senior career*
Years	Team	Apps	(Gls)
- Billericay Town
- Maldon Town
2009	Geylang United		(3)
- * Club domestic league appearances and goals as of 2 August 2011

Lloyd Anthony Butler (born 13 February 1989) is an English former professional footballer who plays as a centre forward.

== Career ==
Born in Grays, Butler spent his early career in non-league football with Billericay Town and Maldon Town.

He spent the 2009 season with S.League club Geylang United, scoring three goals.
