= Ryota Kobayashi =

Japanese footballer

Personal information
- Full name: Ryota Kobayashi
- Date of birth: June 22, 1988 (age 38)
- Place of birth: Takasaki, Gunma, Japan
- Height: 1.81 m (5 ft 11 1/2 in)
- Position: Defender

Team information
- Current team: Grulla Morioka
- Number: 3

Youth career
- 2004–2006: Takasaki City University of Economics High School

Senior career*
Years	Team	Apps	(Gls)
2007–2010	Thespa Kusatsu	0	(0)
2007	→ Ohara JaSRA (loan)	6	(1)
2008–2009	→ Albirex Niigata Singapore (loan)	41	(2)
2011	Arte Takasaki	18	(0)
2012–	Grulla Morioka	81	(14)
- * Club domestic league appearances and goals as of 23 February 2016

Ryota Kobayashi (小林 亮太, Kobayashi Ryōta; born June 22, 1988) is a Japanese football player for Grulla Morioka.

== Club statistics ==
Updated to 23 February 2016.

Club performance			League		Cup		Total	
Season	Club	League	Apps	Goals	Apps	Goals	Apps	Goals
Japan			League		Emperor's Cup		Total	
2010	Thespa Kusatsu	J2 League	0	0	0	0	0	0
2011	Arte Takasaki	JFL	18	0	1	0	19	0
2012	Grulla Morioka	JRL (Tohoku, Div. 1)	11	4	1	0	12	4
2013	Grulla Morioka	JRL (Tohoku, Div. 1)	14	4	1	0	15	4
2014	Grulla Morioka	J3 League	30	2	1	0	31	2
2015	Grulla Morioka	J3 League	26	4	1	0	27	4
Career total			99	14	5	0	104	14
