= Fadzuhasny Juraimi =

Singaporean footballer

Personal information
- Full name: Mohamed Fadzuhasny bin Juraimi
- Date of birth: 3 September 1979 (age 47)
- Place of birth: Singapore
- Height: 1.76 m (5 ft 9 1/2 in)
- Position: Striker

Team information
- Current team: Singapore (Assistant coach)

Senior career*
Years	Team	Apps	(Gls)
2001	Singapore Armed Forces	17	(6)
2002–2003	Tanjong Pagar United	66	(27)
2004	Young Lions	24	(5)
2005–2006	Home United	41	(11)
2007	Geylang United	22	(3)
2008	Woodlands Wellington	27	(2)
2009–2010	Home United	?	(?)

International career^{‡}
2001–2010	Singapore	23	(6)

Managerial career
- 2019–: Singapore U20
- 2020–: Young Lions (assistant)
- * Club domestic league appearances and goals as of 21 May 2009 ‡ National team caps and goals as of 21 May 2009

Mohamed Fadzuhasny bin Juraimi (born 3 September 1979) is a Singaporean football coach and former player. He is currently the assistant coach of the Singapore Under-20 national team and the Singapore Premier League club Young Lions.

He is a natural striker who is known for his volleys and clinical finishing.

== International career ==
He made his debut for the Singapore in 2001.

=== International goals ===
International goals by date, venue, cap, opponent, score, result and competition
No.	Date	Venue	Opponent	Score	Result	Competition
1	4 August 2003	Kallang, Singapore	Hong Kong	2–0	4–1	Friendly
