= Peres (Brazilian footballer) =

Brazilian footballer

Peres de Oliveira
Personal information
- Full name: Peres Spíndula de Oliveira
- Date of birth: November 7, 1974 (age 52)
- Place of birth: Contagem, Brazil
- Height: 1.78 m (5 ft 10 in)
- Positions: Midfielder; striker

Senior career*
Years	Team	Apps	(Gls)
1992–1995	Democrata-GV		
2000	Serra		
2001–2005	Home United	154	(84)
2006–2007	Tampines Rovers FC	57	(26)
2008–2010	Home United	26	(23)
- * Club domestic league appearances and goals as of May 21, 2009

Peres Spíndula de Oliveira (born 7 November 1974), also known as Peres , is a Brazilian professional football player who last played for Home United FC in S.League. He retired at the end of the 2010 season.

== Club career ==
Peres was born in Contagem, Brazil, and played for many teams in Brazil, including Esporte Clube Democrata and Sociedade Desportiva Serra Futebol Clube, before playing in Singapore.

He was the top scorer in Singapore's S.League in 2003, while playing for Home United FC. He was also named the S.League's Player of the Year for that year.

Oliveira moved to rivals Tampines Rovers FC together with Sutee Suksomkit at the end of the 2005 season. But then in 2008, he moved back to Home United.

== Honours ==
=== Club ===
==== Home United ====
- S.League: 2003
- Singapore Cup: 2001, 2003, 2005

==== Tampines Rovers ====
- Singapore Cup: 2006

=== Individual ===
- S.League Player of the Year: 2003
- S.League Top Scorer Award: 2003

== Videos ==
- youtube.com
- youtube.com
