= Super Reds FC =

Yishun Super Reds
- Full name: Yishun Super Reds Football Club
- Nickname(s): The Bears
- Founded: 2007 (as Korean Super Reds)
- Dissolved: 2010
- Ground: Yishun Stadium; Yishun, Singapore
- Capacity: 3,400
- Chairman: Charlie Yoon
- Manager: Jeon Kyung-jun
- League: S.League
- 2009: S.League, 5th of 11
Home colours	Away colours

Yishun Super Reds Football Club was a South Korean professional football club based in Yishun, Singapore, which played as a foreign team in the S.League between 2007 and 2009.

== History ==
The creation of the club in 2007 was driven by the Korean community in Singapore. Parties involved in the governance included the Korean Association of Singapore and Korean embassy in Singapore. The club was originally known as Korean Super Reds FC, but changed its name to Super Reds FC. In 2010, they changed the name to Yishun Super Reds FC in an attempt to convert into a local club. However, the newly reformed Yishun Super Reds FC was denied a place in the 2010 S.League. The club played their home games at Yishun Stadium. Its founding chairman was Hong In-Woong, who was previously the technical director of Sporting Afrique FC. His successor was Charlie Yoon, who was the CEO of the club's main sponsor, QT Technology Pte Ltd.

== Seasons ==
Season	Pos	P	W	D	L	F	A	Pts	Singapore Cup	Singapore League Cup
2007	12th	33	3	9	21	24	80	18	Preliminary	Quarter-finals
2008	2nd	33	24	3	6	68	32	75	Quarter-finals	Runners-up
2009	5th	33	14	8	8	52	34	50	Preliminary	Quarter-finals

== Final squad (2009) ==
Note: Flags indicate national team as defined under FIFA eligibility rules; some limited exceptions apply. Players may hold more than one non-FIFA nationality.

No.	Pos.	Nation	Player
1	GK	(South Korea) KOR	Kang Su-ho
2	DF	(South Korea) KOR	Kim Shin-yui
3	DF	(South Korea) KOR	Park Chul-hyung
4	DF	(South Korea) KOR	Park Seong-jin
5	DF	(South Korea) KOR	Shin Dae-kyung
6	FW	(South Korea) KOR	Choi Dong-soo
7	MF	(South Korea) KOR	Kwon jin
8	MF	(South Korea) KOR	Yu Hyun-koo
9	FW	(South Korea) KOR	Lee Du-ri
10	FW	(South Korea) KOR	Kim Yoon-sik
11	MF	(South Korea) KOR	Seo Su-jong

No.	Pos.	Nation	Player
12	DF	(South Korea) KOR	Kang Hyun-soo
13	DF	(South Korea) KOR	Kim Seong-kyu
14	FW	(South Korea) KOR	Chang Jo-yoon
15	FW	(South Korea) KOR	Park Kang-jin
16	DF	(South Korea) KOR	Kim Youn-jin
17	MF	(South Korea) KOR	Jeon Byung-euk
18	MF	(South Korea) KOR	Shin Seung-ki
20	MF	(South Korea) KOR	Sin Hyun-ho
21	GK	(South Korea) KOR	Jeon Bong-seong
22	MF	(South Korea) KOR	Park Han-seok
23	MF	(South Korea) KOR	Jin Sung-won

== Final coaching staff (2009) ==
- (South Korea) Jeon Kyung-jun (player-manager)
- (South Korea) Shin Hyun-Ho (assistant)
- (South Korea) Bae Jin-Soo (assistant)

== See also ==
- Seoul Phoenix FC
