= Obadin Aikhena =

Singaporean-Nigerian footballer

Gabe Obadin
Personal information
- Date of birth: 9 May 1986 (age 40)
- Place of birth: Iseyin, Nigeria
- Height: 1.85 m (6 ft 1 in)
- Position: Defender

Youth career
- Dragon FC of Cotonou

Senior career*
| Years | Team | Apps | (Gls) |
| 2003–2004 | Dragon FC of Cotonou | | |
| 2005 | Union Bank | | |
| 2006–2007 | Gombak United | 8 | (0) |
| 2008–2009 | Young Lions | 6 | (2) |
| 2010–2012 | Gombak United | 83 | (8) |
| 2013 | Balestier Khalsa | 1 | (0) |
| 2014 | Nay Pyi Taw | 9 | (1) |
| 2015 | Shan United | 0 | (0) |
- * Club domestic league appearances and goals as of 15 March 2014

Gabriel Obadin Aikhena (born 9 May 1986 in Iseyin, Nigeria) is a former Nigerian footballer last who plays as a defender for Shan United

His younger brother Odion Obadin is also a former professional footballer.

== Honours ==
Balestier Khalsa

- League Cup: 2013
