= Park Tae-won (footballer) =

South Korean footballer (born 1977)

Park Tae-Won
Personal information
- Date of birth: April 12, 1977 (age 49)
- Place of birth: South Korea
- Height: 1.77 m (5 ft 10 in)
- Positions: Midfielder; forward

Senior career*
Years	Team	Apps	(Gls)
1999–2000	Chunnam Dragons	1	(0)
2001–2003	Jurong FC	93	(45)
2004	Balestier Khalsa	25	(7)
2005–2008	Woodlands Wellington		(40)
2009–2010	Singapore Armed Forces		
- * Club domestic league appearances and goals

Park Tae-won (Korean: 박태원; born April 12, 1977) is a South Korean professional footballer who last played for the Singaporean club Singapore Armed Forces.

== Club career ==
=== South Korea ===
He began his football career with South Korean club Chunnam Dragons in 1999. He played only 1 league game with Chunnam.

=== Singapore ===
In 2001, Park moved to S. League in Singapore, and joined Jurong FC. He finished as Jurong's top goalscorer with 24 goals in his debut season. Throughout a three-year spell at Jurong, he scored a total of 44 goals.

Park joined Balestier Khalsa in 2004, but he moved to Woodlands Wellington a year later.

At Woodlands, he scored 40 goals in four seasons, and in 2008, became only the eighth player to score 100 goals in the S.League.

From 2009, he joined Singapore Armed Forces.

== Honours ==
=== Club ===
==== Woodlands Wellington ====
- League Cup:2007

=== Individual ===
- 100 S.League Goals: 2008
