= 2008 Singapore Armed Forces FC season =

Singapore Armed Forces
2008 season
- Head coach: Richard Bok
- S.League: 1st
- Singapore Cup: Winners
- AFC Cup: Quarter-finals
- Top goalscorer: League: Aleksandar Duric (12); All: Aleksandar Đurić (17)

Singapore Armed Forces FC competed as one of the 12 teams in the 2008 NTUC Income Yeo's S-League season. The club also took part in the 2008 editions of the RHB Singapore Cup and the Singapore League Cup, as well as the regional AFC Cup.

== Final league standing ==
Pos	Team	Pld	W	D	L	GF	GA	GD	Pts	Qualification
1	Singapore Armed Forces	33	24	5	4	85	34	+51	77	Qualification to AFC Champions League Qualifying Play-off or AFC Cup group stage
2	(South Korea) Super Reds (Note: The three foreign clubs – Albirex Niigata (S), Dalian Shide Siwu and Super Reds – as well as the Football Association of Singapore under-23 team, Young Lions, were not eligible for qualification to continental competitions.)	33	24	3	6	68	32	+36	75	
3	Home United	33	23	3	7	75	31	+44	72	Qualification to AFC Cup Group Stage (Note: Home United qualified for the 2009 AFC Cup by being the next highest-placed local club behind S.League and 2008 Singapore Cup winners Singapore Armed Forces.)
4	Tampines Rovers	33	20	5	8	66	37	+29	65	
5	Gombak United	33	14	10	9	47	39	+8	52	

Source: RSSSF
Rules for classification: 1) points; 2) goal difference; 3) number of goals scored; 4) head-to-head

== Club ==
=== Management ===
Position	Staff
General Manager	(Singapore) Kok Wai Leong
Head Coach	(Singapore) Richard Bok
Prime League Coach	(Singapore) V. Selvaraj
Goalkeeping Coach	(Singapore) David Lee

== First team ==
As of May 21, 2008

Note: Flags indicate national team as defined under FIFA eligibility rules; some limited exceptions apply. Players may hold more than one non-FIFA nationality.

No.	Pos.	Nation	Player
1	GK	SGP	Toh Guo'An
2	DF	SGP	Shaiful Esah
3	DF	JPN	Kenji Arai
4	DF	SGP	Hafiz Osman
5	DF	SGP	Faizal Aziz
7	MF	JPN	Masahiro Fukasawa
8	MF	THA	Therdsak Chaiman
9	FW	SGP	Aleksandar Đurić
10	MF	SGP	John Wilkinson
11	MF	JPN	Norikazu Murakami
12	MF	SGP	Jamil Ali

No.	Pos.	Nation	Player
13	DF	SGP	Razaleigh Khalik
14	GK	SGP	Shahril Jantan
15	GK	SGP	Rasyid Hamid
16	DF	SGP	Daniel Bennett
18	FW	SGP	Ashrin Shariff
19	MF	SGP	Mustaqim Manzur
20	MF	SGP	Syed Karim
21	DF	SGP	Asraf Rashid
22	MF	SGP	Fadzil Nasir
23	MF	SGP	Ridhuan Osman
25	FW	SGP	Shaiful Rahman

=== List of 2007–08 transfers ===
==== In ====
Note: Flags indicate national team as defined under FIFA eligibility rules; some limited exceptions apply. Players may hold more than one non-FIFA nationality.

No.	Pos.	Nation	Player
—	DF	SGP	Razaleigh Khalik (From Geylang United FC)

==== Out ====
Note: Flags indicate national team as defined under FIFA eligibility rules; some limited exceptions apply. Players may hold more than one non-FIFA nationality.

No.	Pos.	Nation	Player
2	DF	SGP	Faizal Hamid (sold to Gombak United)
7	DF	SGP	Razif Mahamud (Released)
17	DF	SGP	Masrezwan Masturi (sold to Geylang United)
20	MF	SGP	Noor Ali (sold to Geylang United)

== Squad stats ==
Updated May 20, 2008

No.	Pos	Nat	Player	Total		S.League		Singapore Cup		Singapore League Cup		AFC Cup	
No.	Pos	Nat	Player	Apps	Goals	Apps	Goals	Apps	Goals	Apps	Goals	Apps	Goals
1	GK	(Singapore) SGP	Toh Guo'An	0	0	0	0	0	0	0	0	0	0
2	DF	(Singapore) SGP	Shaiful Esah	17	1	12	1	1	0	0	0	4	0
3	DF	(Japan) JPN	Kenji Arai	19	2	13	2	0	0	0	0	6	0
4	DF	(Singapore) SGP	Hafiz Osman	12	0	8	0	1	0	0	0	3	0
5	DF	(Singapore) SGP	Faizal Aziz	10	0	5	0	1	0	0	0	4	0
7	MF	(Japan) JPN	Masahiro Fukasawa	20	3	13	3	1	0	0	0	6	0
8	MF	(Thailand) THA	Therdsak Chaiman	19	5	13	3	1	0	0	0	5	2
9	FW	(Singapore) SGP	Aleksandar Đurić	20	17	13	12	1	0	0	0	6	5
10	MF	(Singapore) SGP	John Wilkinson	18	1	12	0	1	0	0	0	5	1
11	FW	(Japan) JPN	Norikazu Murakami	15	5	13	4	1	1	0	0	1	0
12	MF	(Singapore) SGP	Jamil Ali	18	4	12	2	1	0	0	0	5	2
13	DF	(Singapore) SGP	Razaleigh Khalik	15	0	11	0	1	0	0	0	3	0
14	GK	(Singapore) SGP	Shahril Jantan	20	-18	13	-14	1	0	0	0	6	-4
15	GK	(Singapore) SGP	Rasyid Hamid	0	0	0	0	0	0	0	0	0	0
16	DF	(Singapore) SGP	Daniel Bennett	20	0	13	0	1	0	0	0	6	0
18	FW	(Singapore) SGP	Ashrin Shariff	16	6	9	5	1	0	0	0	6	1
19	MF	(Singapore) SGP	Mustaqim Manzur	18	5	11	3	1	1	0	0	6	1
20	MF	(Singapore) SGP	Syed Karim	7	0	4	0	0	0	0	0	3	0
21	DF	(Singapore) SGP	Asraf Rashid	0	0	0	0	0	0	0	0	0	0
22	MF	(Singapore) SGP	Fadzil Nasir	2	0	0	0	0	0	0	0	2	0
23	MF	(Singapore) SGP	Ridhuan Osman	1	0	0	0	0	0	0	0	1	0
25	FW	(Singapore) SGP	Shaiful Rahman	1	0	0	0	0	0	0	0	1	0

== Matches ==
Updated to games played May 20, 2008

=== Pre-season friendlies ===
Match	Date	Tournament	Location	Opponent team	Score	Scorers
1	January 16, 2008	Friendly	Choa Chu Kang Stadium	Balestier Khalsa	3–0	G Lenan 35' (o.g.), M. Fukasawa 77', K. Buang 85' (pen.)
2	January 19, 2008	Friendly	Choa Chu Kang Stadium	Gombak United	0–0	
3	January 23, 2008	Friendly	Hougang Stadium	Sengkang Punggol	0–0	
4	February 1, 2008	Friendly	Choa Chu Kang Stadium	Super Reds	2–3	unknown
5	February 5, 2008	Friendly	Pasir Gudang, Malaysia	Johor FC	2–1	unknown
6	February 17, 2008	Singapore Charity Shield	Jalan Besar Stadium	Home United	1–1 (5–4 on penalties)	A. Shariff 86' (pen)

=== S-League ===
Match	Date	Home/Away	Opponent team	Score	Scorers
1	February 22, 2008	Away (LIVE)	Albirex Niigata (S)	1–3	N. Murakami 4', K. Ogawa 34' (o.g.), T. Chaiman 88'
2	February 26, 2008	Home	Geylang United	3–1	N. Murakami 23', A. Đurić 78', A. Shariff 84'
3	February 29, 2008	Home (LIVE)	Sengkang Punggol	3–0	M. Fukasawa 30', A. Đurić 38', J. Ali 44'
4	March 6, 2008	Away	Dalian Shide Siwu	1–6	A. Đurić 10', 39', A. Shariff 61', 66', 90', J. Ali 90'
5	March 14, 2008	Away	Tampines Rovers	1–2	T. Chaiman 69' (pen), M. Manzur 84'
6	March 29, 2008	Home	Woodlands Wellington	3–0	A. Đurić 76', S. Esah 84', A. Shariff 89'
7	April 6, 2008	Away	Balestier Khalsa	0–2	A. Đurić 48', K. Arai 67'
8	April 10, 2008	Home	Young Lions	4–0	M. Manzur 30', A. Đurić 70', 76', 79'
9	April 13, 2008	Away	Super Reds	3–2	M. Manzur 17', K.S. Eun 63' (o.g.)
10	April 21, 2008	Home	Home United	2–2	M. Fukasawa 3', T. Chaiman 35'
11	April 25, 2008	Away (LIVE)	Gombak United	2–2	N. Murakami 24', Therdsak Chaiman 89'
12	May 4, 2008	Away	Geylang United	2–3	N. Murakami 35', A. Đurić 53', 55'
13	May 20, 2008	Away	Albirex Niigata (S)	3–1	M. Fukasawa 36', K. Arai 73', A. Đurić 88'
14	May 24, 2008	Away	Sengkang Punggol	0–1	T. Chaiman 90'

=== Singapore Cup ===
Match	Date	Round	Home/Away	Opponent team	Score	Scorers
1	May 8, 2008	First Knockout Round	Home	Balestier Khalsa	2–0	N. Murakami 40', M. Manzur 90'

=== AFC Cup ===
Match	Date	Round	Home/Away	Opponent team	Score	Scorers
1	March 11, 2008	Group Stage	Home	Kitchee (Hong Kong)	4–0	J. Ali 20', 37', T. Chaiman 25', Wang Z.P. 51' (o.g.)
2	March 18, 2008	Group Stage	Away	Perak FA (Malaysia)	1–6	T. Chaiman 8', A. Đurić 45', 49', 71', 74', M. Manzur 58'
3	April 2, 2008	Group Stage	Away	New Radiant (Maldives)	0–3	A. Shariff 7', A. Đurić 44', I. Amil 86' (o.g.)
4	April 2, 2008	Group Stage	Home	New Radiant (Maldives)	1–1	J. Wilkinson 27'
5	April 30, 2008	Group Stage	Away	Kitchee (Hong Kong)	0–2	A. Shariff 10', A. Đurić 19'
6	May 14, 2008	Group Stage	Home	Perak FA (Malaysia)	0–2	

== Player seasonal records ==
Competitive matches only. Numbers in brackets indicate appearances made. Updated to games played May 20, 2008.

=== Goalscorers ===
Rank	Name	S-League	Singapore Cup	Singapore League Cup	AFC Cup	Total
1	(Singapore) Aleksandar Đurić	12 (13)	0 (1)	0 (0)	5 (6)	17 (20)
2	(Singapore) Ashrin Shariff	5 (9)	0 (1)	0 (0)	1 (6)	6 (16)
2	(Thailand) Therdsak Chaiman	4 (13)	0 (1)	0 (0)	2 (5)	6 (19)
3	(Japan) Norikazu Murakami	4 (13)	1 (1)	0 (0)	0 (1)	5 (15)
3	(Singapore) Mustaqim Manzur	3 (11)	1 (1)	0 (0)	1 (6)	5 (18)
4	(Singapore) Jamil Ali	2 (12)	0 (1)	0 (0)	2 (5)	4 (18)
5	(Japan) Masahiro Fukasawa	3 (13)	0 (1)	0 (0)	0 (6)	3 (20)
6	(Japan) Kenji Arai	2 (13)	0 (0)	0 (0)	0 (6)	2 (19)
7	(Singapore) Shaiful Esah	1 (12)	0 (1)	0 (0)	0 (4)	1 (17)
7	(Singapore) John Wilkinson	0 (12)	0 (1)	0 (0)	1 (5)	1 (18)

=== Discipline ===
Rank	Name	S-League		Singapore Cup		Singapore League Cup		AFC Cup		Total		
Rank	Name	Yellow card	Red card	Yellow card	Red card	Yellow card	Red card	Yellow card	Red card	Yellow card	Red card	Total Cards
1	(Japan) Kenji Arai	5	0	0	0	0	0	0	0	5	0	5
2	(Singapore) John Wilkinson	4	0	0	0	0	0	1	0	5	0	5
3	(Singapore) Aleksandar Đurić	0	0	0	0	0	0	1	0	1	0	1
4	(Singapore) Shaiful Esah	0	0	0	0	0	0	1	0	1	0	1
5	(Singapore) Hafiz Osman	0	0	0	0	0	0	1	0	1	0	1
6	(Thailand) Therdsak Chaiman	0	0	0	0	0	0	1	0	1	0	1
7	(Singapore) Mustaqim Manzur	0	0	0	0	0	0	1	0	1	0	1
