= 2009 Singapore League Cup =

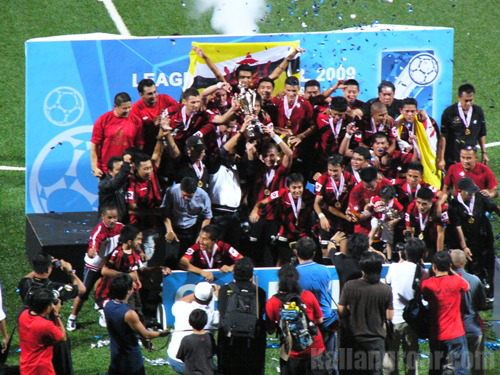
- DPMM winning the Singapore League Cup

Tournament details
- Country: Singapore
- Teams: 12

Final positions
- Champions: Brunei DPMM
- Runners-up: SAFFC
- Third place: Home United

The 2009 Singapore League Cup kicked off on 1 June.

For this season, the 12 teams will be divided into four groups of three in the preliminary round which will be played on a round-robin basis. The top two teams from each group qualify for the next round which will be played on a knockout (single elimination) basis.

The 2009 League Cup Final took place on 19 June (Friday) at the Jalan Besar Stadium.

== Group stage ==
The draw for the group stage was held on May 14, 2009. The 12 S-League teams are drawn into 4 groups of 3

Winners and runners up of each group will qualify for the quarter-finals.

=== Group A ===
Team	Pld	W	D	L	GF	GA	GD	Pts
(Brunei) DPMM FC	2	2	0	0	4	0	+4	6
SAFFC	2	1	0	1	2	3	−1	3
(Japan) Albirex Niigata (S)	2	0	0	2	0	3	−3	0

2 June 2009
19:45

(Brunei) DPMM FC	1 – 0	(Japan) Albirex Niigata (S)
Haji Subhi Abdilah 24'	Preview; Details; Report

Jalan Besar Stadium
Attendance: 988
Referee: Sukhbir Singh

5 June 2009
19:45

SAFFC	0 – 3	(Brunei) DPMM FC
	Preview; Details; Report	Ivan Jerkovic 27'; Shahrazen Said 43'; Hamid Berguiga 75'

Jurong West Stadium
Attendance: 1,184
Referee: T Aravinthan

8 June 2009
19:45

(Japan) Albirex Niigata (S)	0 – 2	SAFFC
	Preview; Details; Report	John Wilkinson 13'; Shaiful Esah 82'

Jalan Besar Stadium
Attendance: 1,906
Referee: Abas Daud

=== Group B ===
Team	Pld	W	D	L	GF	GA	GD	Pts
Tampines Rovers	2	1	0	1	3	1	+2	3
Geylang United	2	1	0	1	3	3	0	3
(Singapore) Young Lions	2	1	0	1	1	3	−2	3

2 June 2009
19:45

Geylang United	3 – 0	(Singapore) Young Lions
Rastislav Belicak 20'; Lloyd Butler 53'; Faritz Abdul Hameed 86' (o.g.)	Preview; Details; Report

Choa Chu Kang Stadium
Attendance: 684
Referee: P Pandian

5 June 2009
19:45

Tampines Rovers	3 – 0	Geylang United
Ridhuan Muhamad 19'; Noh Alam Shah 61'; Sutee Suksomkit 65'	Preview; Details; Report

Jalan Besar Stadium
Attendance: 1,469
Referee: Leow Thiam Hoe

8 June 2009
19:45

(Singapore) Young Lions	1 – 0	Tampines Rovers
Erwan Gunawan 2'	Preview; Details; Report

Jurong West Stadium
Attendance: 874
Referee: Johan Jahari

=== Group C ===
Team	Pld	W	D	L	GF	GA	GD	Pts
(South Korea) Super Reds	2	1	1	0	2	1	+1	4
Gombak United	2	1	0	1	1	1	0	3
Balestier Khalsa	2	0	1	1	1	2	−1	1

1 June 2009
19:45

Gombak United	1 – 0	Balestier Khalsa
Ruhaizad Ismail 1'	Preview; Details; Report

Jalan Besar Stadium
Attendance: 922
Referee: Zaid Bin Hussein

4 June 2009
19:45

(South Korea) Super Reds	1 – 0	Gombak United
Choi Dong Soo 71'	Preview; Details; Report

Jalan Besar Stadium
Attendance: 1,614
Referee: Abas Daud

7 June 2009
19:45

Balestier Khalsa	1 – 1	(South Korea) Super Reds
Bryan Soane 78'	Preview; Details; Report	Park Kang Jin 50'

Choa Chu Kang Stadium
Attendance: 648
Referee: Adzhar Adziz

=== Group D ===
Team	Pld	W	D	L	GF	GA	GD	Pts
Home United	2	2	0	0	5	2	+3	6
Woodlands Wellington	2	0	1	1	3	4	−1	1
Sengkang Punggol	2	0	1	1	3	5	−2	1

1 June 2009
19:45

Sengkang Punggol	2 – 2	Woodlands Wellington
Indra Sahdan 33'; Mamadou Diallo 81'	Preview; Details; Report	Jamil Ali 67' 80'

Jurong East Stadium
Attendance: 615
Referee: Muhd Taqi

4 June 2009
19:45

Home United	3 – 1	Sengkang Punggol
Fadzuhasny Juraimi 45'; Firdaus Idros 70'; Naruphol Ar-Romsawa 83'	Preview; Details; Report	Indra Sahdan 90'

Jurong East Stadium
Attendance: 844
Referee: Jeevanathan P M

7 June 2009
19:45

Woodlands Wellington	1 – 2	Home United
Jamil Ali 66'	Preview; Details; Report	Norikazu Murakami 23' 54'

Jalan Besar Stadium
Attendance: 1,210
Referee: W Ravisanthiran

== Knockout stage ==
=== Bracket ===
Quarter-Finals
A1	(Brunei) DPMM FC	5
B2	Geylang United	3
C1	(South Korea) Super Reds	0 (3)
D2	Woodlands Wellington (pen.)	0 (4)
D1	Home United	3
C2	Gombak United	2
B1	Tampines Rovers	1 (3)
A2	SAFFC (pen.)	1 (4)

Semi-Finals
A1	(Brunei) DPMM FC	2
D2	Woodlands Wellington	1
D1	Home United	0
A2	SAFFC	2

Final
A1	(Brunei) DPMM FC (pen.)	1 (4)
A2	SAFFC	1 (3)
Third place
D2	Woodlands Wellington	2 (1)
D1	Home United (pen.)	2 (4)

=== Quarter-finals ===
10 June 2009
19:45

(South Korea) Super Reds	0 – 0 (a.e.t.)	Woodlands Wellington
Jeon Bong Seong (red card) 118'	Preview; Details; Report	Zakaria Yousif (yellow card) 87' (yellow-red card) 90'
Penalties
Yu Hyun-Koo (penalty missed); Kim Tae-Young (penalty missed); Choi Dong Soo (penalty scored); Park Kang Jin (penalty scored); Kim Yoon-Sik (penalty scored)	3 – 4	(penalty scored) Daniel Hammond; (penalty scored) Luis Eduardo Hicks; (penalty missed) Kamal Nasir; (penalty scored) Asraf Rashid; (penalty scored) Precious Emuejeraye

Jalan Besar Stadium
Attendance: 1,480
Referee: P Pandian

11 June 2009
19:45

Home United	3 – 2	Gombak United
Valery Hiek 9'; Azhar Sairudin 45'; Naruphol Ar-Romsawa 55'	Preview; Details; Report	Agu Casmir 12'; Kingsley Njoku 65'

Jalan Besar Stadium
Attendance: 2,356
Referee: Abdul Malik

12 June 2009
19:45

(Brunei) DPMM FC	5 – 3	Geylang United
Hamid Berguiga 35'; Rene Komar 37'; Ivan Jerkovic 58' 66' (pen.); Rosmin Kamis 90' (pen.)	Preview; Details; Report	Hafiz Rahim 9'; Baihakki Khaizan 52' (pen.); Yasir Hanapi 59'

Jalan Besar Stadium
Attendance: 1,310
Referee: Muhd Taqi

13 June 2009
19:45

Tampines Rovers	1 – 1 (a.e.t.)	SAFFC
Seiji Kaneko 11'	Preview; Details; Report	Shaiful Esah 69'
Penalties
Sutee Suksomkit (penalty missed); Mustafic Fahrudin (penalty missed); Seiji Kaneko (penalty scored); Shukor Zailan (penalty scored); Noh Alam Shah (penalty missed); Benoît Croissant (penalty scored); Firdaus Kasman (penalty missed)	3 – 4	(penalty missed) John Wilkinson; (penalty scored) Daniel Bennett; (penalty scored) Park Tae-Won; (penalty missed) Aleksandar Đurić; (penalty missed) Shaiful Esah; (penalty scored) Masahiro Fukasawa; (penalty scored) Kenji Arai

Jalan Besar Stadium
Attendance: 1,758
Referee: T Aravinthan

=== Semi-finals ===
15 June 2009
19:45

(Brunei) DPMM FC	2 – 1	Woodlands Wellington
Ivan Jerkovic 26'; Hamid Berguiga 55' (yellow card) 87' (yellow-red card) 87'	Preview; Details; Report	Mojtaba Tehranizadeh 72'

Jalan Besar Stadium
Attendance: 2,181
Referee: Abdul Malik

16 June 2009
19:45

Home United	0 – 2	SAFFC
	Preview; Details; Report	Park Tae-Won 66'; Aleksandar Duric 90'

Jalan Besar Stadium
Attendance: 2,197
Referee: Leow Thiam Hoe

=== Third-Place Playoff ===
19 June 2009
17:00

Woodlands Wellington	2 – 2 (A.E.T)	Home United
Zakaria Yousif 53'; Precious Emuejeraye 85' (pen.)	Preview; Details; Report	Sufian Anuar 34' 72'
Penalties
Syaiful Iskandar (penalty scored); Asraf Rashid (penalty missed); Mojtaba Tehranizadeh (penalty missed)	1 – 4	(penalty scored) Peres De Oliveira; (penalty scored) Rosman Sulaiman; (penalty scored) Shi Jiayi; (penalty scored) Azhar Sairudin

Jalan Besar Stadium
Attendance: 5,320
Referee: Sukhbir Singh

=== Final ===
19 June 2009
19:45

(Brunei) DPMM FC	1 – 1 (a.e.t.)	SAFFC
Rene Komar 9'	Preview; Details; Report	Aleksandar Duric 5'
Penalties
Shahrazen Said (penalty scored); Hardi Bujang (penalty scored); Azwan Saleh (penalty scored); Oh Ddog-Yi (penalty missed); Rosmin Kamis (penalty scored)	4 – 3	(penalty scored) John Wilkinson; (penalty scored) Daniel Bennett; (penalty scored) Park Tae-Won; (penalty missed) Masahiro Fukasawa; (penalty missed) Razaleigh Khalik

Jalan Besar Stadium
Attendance: 5,320
Referee: Abas Daud

DPMM FC
SAFFC

Brunei DPMM:
GK	25	(Brunei) Wardun Yussof
DF	2	(Brunei) Yusof Salleh	(yellow card) 105'
DF	5	(Croatia) Rene Komar
MF	3	(Brunei) Sairol Sahari
MF	7	(Brunei) Azwan Saleh
MF	11	(Brunei) Haji Subhi Abdilah	(yellow card) 27'
MF	13	(Brunei) Rosmin Kamis (c)
MF	15	(Brunei) Suhaime Yussof		(substituted off) 65'
MF	17	(Brunei) Abu Bakar Mahari		(substituted off) 64'
FW	8	(South Korea) Oh Ddog-yi	(yellow card) 83'
FW	22	(Brunei) Shahrazen Said
Substitutes:
GK	18	(Brunei) Hamzah Abdul Rahman
DF	4	(Brunei) Safari Wahit		(substituted on) 65'
MF	9	(Brunei) Hardi Bujang	(yellow card) 118'	(substituted on) 64'
MF	19	(Brunei) Dahari Yussof
MF	20	(Brunei) Helmi Zambin
MF	24	(Brunei) Maududi Hilmi Kasmi
FW	23	(Brunei) Haji Rahimni Pundat
Coach:
(Croatia) Vjeran Simunic

SAFFC:
GK	14	(Singapore) Shahril Jantan
DF	2	(Singapore) Shaiful Esah
DF	3	(Japan) Kenji Arai	(yellow card) 76'
DF	4	(Singapore) Hafiz Osman
DF	16	(Singapore) Daniel Bennett
DF	21	(Singapore) Zulfadli Zainal Abidin		(substituted off) 72'
MF	6	(Japan) Masahiro Fukasawa
MF	10	(Singapore) John Wilkinson
MF	18	(South Korea) Park Tae-Won
MF	20	(Singapore) Syed Karim		(substituted off) 94'
FW	9	(Singapore) Aleksandar Duric (c)
Substitutes:
GK	1	(Singapore) Toh Guo'An
DF	13	(Singapore) Razaleigh Khalik		(substituted on) 72'
MF	7	(Singapore) Ahmad Latiff		(substituted on) 94'
MF	23	(Singapore) Dharham Aziz
MF	25	(Singapore) Abdil Qaiyyim Mutalib
MF	33	(Singapore) Shaiful Amry Abdullah
FW	12	(Singapore) Guntur Djafril
Coach:
(Singapore) Richard Bok

Man of the Match: (Croatia) Rene Komar

MATCH OFFICIALS

- Assistant referees:
  - Jeffrey Goh
  - Edwin Tan
- Fourth official: T Aravinthan

MATCH RULES

- 90 minutes.
- 30 minutes of extra-time if necessary.
- Penalty shoot-out if scores still level.
- Seven named substitutes
- Maximum of 3 substitutions.

== See also ==
- S.League
- Singapore Cup
- Singapore Charity Shield
- Football Association of Singapore
- List of football clubs in Singapore
