= Daniel Bennett (footballer) =

British-born Singaporean footballer (born 1978)

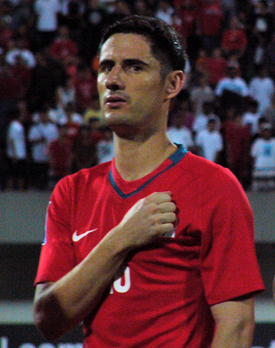
- Bennett with Singapore in 2008

Personal information
- Full name: Daniel Mark Bennett
- Date of birth: 7 January 1978 (age 48)
- Place of birth: Great Yarmouth, England
- Height: 1.84 m (6 ft 0 in)
- Positions: Centre-back; full-back

Youth career
- 1993–1995: Tiong Bahru

Senior career*
Years	Team	Apps	(Gls)
1995–1998	Tiong Bahru	33	(4)
1999–2000	Balestier Central	17	(1)
2000–2001	Tanjong Pagar United	35	(0)
2002	Wrexham	6	(0)
2002	Singapore Armed Forces	13	(0)
2002–2003	Wrexham	18	(0)
2003–2004	Singapore Armed Forces	42	(1)
2005–2006	Woodlands Wellington	57	(4)
2007–2016	Warriors	239	(5)
2016	Geylang International	20	(2)
2017–2021	Tampines Rovers	81	(3)
2022	Tanjong Pagar United	17	(1)
Total		578	(21)

International career
2002–2017	Singapore	147	(7)
Medal record
Men's football
Representing Singapore
Asean Football Championship
Winner	AFF Suzuki Cup 2004	2004
Winner	AFF Suzuki Cup 2007	2007
Winner	AFF Suzuki Cup 2012	2012
- * Club domestic league appearances and goals

Daniel Mark Bennett (born 7 January 1978) is a former professional footballer. Mainly a centre-back, Bennett is a versatile player who is a strong reader of the game, allowing him to make crucial interceptions despite not being blessed with great pace; he is also known for his trademark long-range free kicks.

Born in England, his family moved to Singapore when Bennett was a toddler. A youth product and subsequently a first team player of the then Tiong Bahru United, (Note: The club was renamed to Tanjong Pagar United FC in 1998.) he renounced his British nationality for Singaporean citizenship in September 2002, with the intention to represent the Singapore national team in international football, the country he has lived in for most of his life.

With 147 caps for Singapore over a span of two decades, he is second on the country's list of most international matches played. Aside from that, Bennett is also the oldest goal scorer in the AFC Champions League and the Singapore Premier League history.

== Early life ==
Bennett was born in Great Yarmouth, England. However, his family moved to Singapore shortly after when he was two years old. He was educated in Singapore at Tanglin Trust School and the United World College of South East Asia, where his father Andrew was a teacher and later headmaster until 2004. Bennett graduated with an honours degree in Sports Science from Loughborough University.

== Club career ==
=== Early career and club debut ===
Bennett was selected to join the FAS Milo Scheme for talented young footballers at the age of 12. He was drafted as a trainee by National Football League side Tiong Bahru three years later, giving him the opportunity to train with the team before he left Singapore to further his tertiary studies in England.

=== Balestier Central ===
Bennett returned to Singapore in 1999 hoping to make a career as a professional footballer. Then Balestier Central coach P. N. Sivaji gave him his first opportunity with the S.League club.

=== Tanjong Pagar United ===
Bennett moved to previous club Tanjong Pagar United (formerly Tiong Bahru) in May 2000. Having played as a midfielder for 15 years, his defining career shift to defence came when coach Tohari Paijan played him as a centre-back in the absence of regular stopper Lim Tong Hai in a league match.

Recognition of his performances came when he was selected in the Singapore selection that faced Manchester United and Liverpool in a couple of high-profile friendly matches, and culminated in a S.League Player of the Year award.

=== Wrexham ===
Bradford City manager Jim Jefferies was impressed with Bennett and offered him a trial at the Yorkshire club. On 8 February 2002, Wrexham manager Denis Smith signed him on a short-term contract til the end of the 2001-02 Football League. Although it is not known how much Wrexham had paid to secure the deal, the club's fans paid money to ensure the club could secure Bennett's signature. He made his league debut against Port Vale on 6 March 2002, partnering Trinidad & Tobago international Dennis Lawrence in the heart of defence. He was assessed as "enjoying a remarkable start, looking composed at the back and reading the game superbly" by the fans, who had contributed money to sign the player. Bennett made over 20 appearances for the Welsh side but with the Welsh side 4th from bottom in the league, relegation was confirmed at the end of the season.

Bennett made a brief return to the S.League in 2002, playing 11 games for Singapore Armed Forces during their title-winning season.

He returned to Wrexham in the 2002-03 season. His second spell was more successful, making 21 appearances, including 3 League Cup games as he helped the club win the FAW Premier Cup and clinch promotion to the Second Division. Bennett was offered new terms by Wrexham at the end of the season but chose to reject the contract to return to Singapore to improve his chances of featuring regularly for the national team.

=== Return to the S.League ===
Amid interest from Home United, Tampines Rovers and Woodlands Wellington after his Wales stint, Bennett signed for defending champions Singapore Armed Forces in mid-2003.

=== Woodlands Wellington ===
He moved to ambitious Woodlands Wellington in 2005, joining his international colleagues Agu Casmir, Itimi Dickson, Goh Tat Chuan and Masrezwan Masturi. Bennett led the team to 3rd place in the 2005 S.League, and 2nd and 3rd placing in the 2005 and 2006 Singapore Cup respectively.

=== Back to SAFFC ===
After two seasons with the Rams, Bennett rejoined Singapore Armed Forces for a second time, achieving the S.League and Singapore Cup double in 2007 and 2008.

In the 2007 Singapore Cup final won by Singapore Armed Forces on 25 November, Bennett was involved in a clash with Tampines Rovers' Noh Alam Shah, a fellow Singapore national team player towards the end of the match. Noh Alam Shah kneed Bennett in the head in a tussle for the ball and after being dragged away by his team-mates, returned and kicked Bennett in the head. Bennett was knocked unconscious and had to be taken to hospital while Alam Shah was sent off by referee Abas Daud. The incident resulted in Alam Shah receiving a 12-month global ban which was reduced to 7 months on appeal.

Bennett was handed the club's captaincy in 2012. As captain he won the Singapore Cup in 2012 as well as the league title in 2014.

=== Geylang International ===
After playing for the Warriors for nine years and amassing four league titles and winning the Singapore Cup three times, Bennett signed for Geylang International ahead of the 2016 S.League campaign. He was a key cog of the Eagles defence, helping the team to the league's third-best defensive record, with 29 goals conceded in 24 games as Geylang finished fifth in the nine-team competition.

=== Tampines Rovers ===
In 2017, Bennett joined the 6th S.League club of his career, signing for Tampines Rovers for the 2017 S.League season. He made 31 appearances in all competitions for the Stags last season and was a key member of league's best local defence, earning him a two-year extension with the club despite almost reaching 40 years old. On 7 July 2021, Bennett scored the only goal for Tampines Rovers in the 2021 AFC Champions League group stage fixtures encounter against Gamba Osaka in an 8–1 defeat at the Bunyodkor Stadium in Tashkent, Uzbekistan. At 43 years and 181 days, Bennett also eclipsed Dejan Damjanović (39 years and 341 days) as the oldest ever scorer in the tournament's history.

=== Tanjong Pagar United ===
In January 2022, Bennett returned to Tanjong Pagar United for the second time after over 20 years. He will play for the Jaguars for the 2022 Singapore Premier League season. On 9 March 2022, Bennett scored a header against Hougang United which put him to become the league's oldest scorer at 44 years and 239 days, breaking Aleksandar Đurić's record of scoring at 43 years and 284 days.

== International career ==
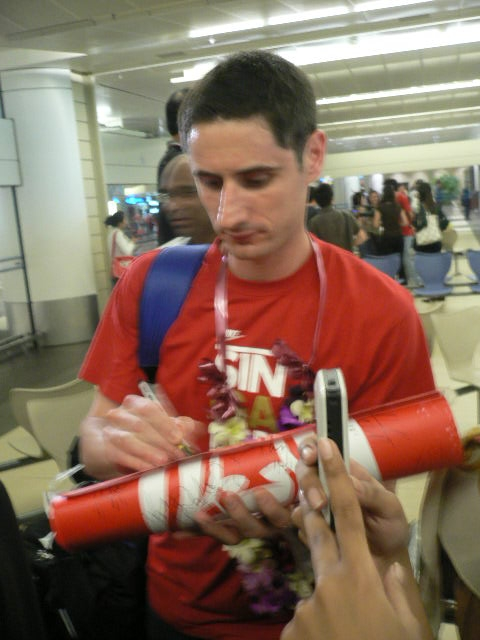
Daniel Bennett at Changi Airport, returning home with the triumphant Singapore team after the 2007 ASEAN Football Championship final.

After deliberating for two years, Bennett applied for Singaporean citizenship and therefore became eligible to become a Singapore national footballer. He made his debut under then head coach Jan B. Poulsen in a friendly match against the Philippines on 11 December 2002. He had a goal disallowed that day, an effort that he still maintains was a legitimate goal.

He would score his first international goal against Hong Kong on 4 August 2003. His timely citizenship meant that he took part in the 2002 ASEAN Football Championship in co-hosts Singapore. However, the Lions failed their target of reaching the final.

However, Bennett and his country would achieve significant successes in football within the next few years. Under coach Radojko Avramović, Bennett never missed a call-up to Singapore's tournament squad. He scored with a long-range effort in the 3rd minute of the 2004 finals first leg against Indonesia in front of an intimidating 100,000 Senayan crowd. This meant that Singapore went on to become champions of Southeast Asia, their second title after their 1998 triumph.

Bennett earned his 100th cap against Thailand on 24 August 2011 and was inducted into the FIFA Century Club. (Note: Bennett earned his 128th cap against Jordan on 6 February 2013.) With his 122nd appearance in the away leg of the 2012 ASEAN Football Championship finals, Bennett surpassed Aide Iskandar and Malek Awab as Singapore's most capped player. Bennett subsequently completed a hat-trick of titles with tournament wins in 2007 and 2012.

As of January 2017, Bennett amassed 132 caps, tied with Shahril Ishak as Singapore's most-capped player.

As of 2022, Bennett has 146 caps for Singapore. He currently holds the national record for the most international matches played for his country.

== Personal life ==
Bennett married Cherry Cheung on 5 January 2005.

== Career statistics ==
=== Club ===
Appearances and goals by club, season and competition
Club	Season	League			National cup		League cup (Note: The inaugural Singapore League Cup was held in 2007.) (Note: Singapore Armed Forces withdrew from the 2007 Singapore League Cup due to prior pre-season commitments.)		Continental (Note: The inaugural AFC Cup was held in 2004.)		Total	
Club	Season	Division	Apps	Goals	Apps	Goals	Apps	Goals	Apps	Goals	Apps	Goals
Tiong Bahru	1995	Premier League							—			
Balestier Central	1999	S.League					—		—		0	0
Balestier Central	2000	S.League					—		—		0	0
Balestier Central	Total		0	0	0	0	0	0	0	0	0	0
Tanjong Pagar United	2001	S.League	35	0			—		—		35	0
Wrexham	2001–02	Second Division	6	0	0	0	0	0	–		6	0
Singapore; Armed Forces	2002	S.League	11	0			—		—		11	0
Wrexham	2002–03	Third Division	18	0					–		18	0
Singapore; Armed Forces	2003	S.League	15	0			—		—		15	0
Singapore; Armed Forces	2004	S.League	27	1			—		—		27	1
Singapore; Armed Forces	Total		42	1	0	0	0	0	0	0	42	1
Woodlands Wellington	2005	S.League	27	4			—		—		27	4
Woodlands Wellington	2006	S.League	30	0			—		—		30	0
Woodlands Wellington	Total		57	4	0	0	0	0	0	0	57	4
Singapore; Armed Forces	2007	S.League	27	1			—		—		27	1
Singapore; Armed Forces	2008	S.League	31	1					—		31	1
Singapore; Armed Forces	2009	S.League	32	1	1	0	4	0	8	0	45	1
Singapore; Armed Forces	2010	S.League	24	1	1	0	0	0	8	1	33	2
Singapore; Armed Forces	2011	S.League	26	0	3	0	0	0	—		29	0
Singapore; Armed Forces	2012	S.League	19	1	6	0	4	0	—		29	1
Singapore; Armed Forces	Total		159	5	11	0	8	0	16	1	194	5
Warriors (Note: Singapore Armed Forces were renamed Warriors FC from the 2013 season.)	2013	S.League	26	0	1	0	0	0	6	0	33	0
Warriors	2014	S.League	27	0	2	0	2	0	—		31	0
Warriors	2015	S.League	27	0	3	0	2	0	—		32	0
Warriors	Total		80	0	6	0	4	0	6	0	96	0
Geylang International	2016	S.League	22	1	3	0	0	0	—		25	1
Tampines Rovers	2017	Singapore Premier League	22	2	2	0	0	0	7	0	31	2
Tampines Rovers	2018	Singapore Premier League	23	1	2	0	0	0	7	0	32	2
Tampines Rovers	2019	Singapore Premier League	17	0	5	0	0	0	5	0	27	0
Tampines Rovers	2020	Singapore Premier League	13	0	0	0	0	0	2	0	15	0
Tampines Rovers	2021	Singapore Premier League	15	1	0	0	0	0	5	1	20	2
Tampines Rovers	Total		90	4	9	0	0	0	26	1	125	5
Tanjong Pagar United	2022	Singapore Premier League	17	1	1	0	0	0	0	0	18	1
Career total			537	16	30	0	12	0	48	2	627	18

( - ) indicates unavailable referenced data conforming to reliable sources guidelines.

=== International ===
Scores and results list Singapore's goal tally first, score column indicates score after each Bennett goal.

List of international goals scored by Daniel Bennett
No.	Date	Venue	Opponent	Score	Result	Competition
1	4 August 2003	Kallang, Singapore	Hong Kong	1–0	4–1	Friendly
2	28 January 2004	Kallang, Singapore	Norway	1–2	2–5	Friendly
3	29 December 2004	Kuala Lumpur, Malaysia	Myanmar	1–0	4–3	2004 ASEAN Football Championship
4	8 January 2005	Jakarta, Indonesia	Indonesia	1–0	3–1	2004 ASEAN Football Championship
5	8 June 2005	Penang, Malaysia	Malaysia	2–1	2–1	Friendly
6	28 December 2006	Bangkok, Thailand	Vietnam	1–1	2–3	2006 King's Cup
7	7 January 2007	Choa Chu Kang, Singapore	Philippines	1–0	4–1	Friendly

== Honours ==
SAFFC (Warriors FC)

- Singapore Premier League: 2002, 2006, 2007, 2008, 2009, 2014
- Singapore Cup: 2007, 2008, 2012
- Singapore Community Shield: 2008, 2010, 2015

Wrexham

- FAW Premier Cup: 2002–03

Tampines Rovers

- Singapore Cup: 2019
- Singapore Community Shield: 2020

Singapore

- ASEAN Football Championship: 2004, 2007, 2012

Individual

- S.League Player of the Year: 2001

== See also ==
- List of men's footballers with 100 or more international caps
- List of Singapore international footballers born outside Singapore
