= Jiang Tao =

Jiang Tao may refer to:

- Jiang Tao (engineer) (born 1963), Chinese engineer and member of the Chinese Academy of Engineering
- Jiang Tao (boxer) (born 1970), Chinese boxer
- Jiang Tao (footballer, born 1985) (died 2004), Chinese association footballer
- Jiang Tao (footballer, born 1989), Chinese association footballer
- Jiang Tao (poet), Chinese poet and professor
- Keung To (born 1999), Hong Kong singer and actor
- Tao Jiang (computer scientist) (born 1963), Chinese-Canadian computer scientist and bioinformatician
