= 2005 S.League =

S. League
- Season: 2005
- Champions: Tampines Rovers; 2nd S.League title
- AFC Cup: Tampines Rovers (S.League winners); Home United (Singapore Cup winners)
- Matches played: 135
- Goals scored: 477 (3.53 per match)
- Top goalscorer: Mirko Grabovac (26)
- Biggest home win: Tampines Rovers 7-0 Geylang United (31 May 2005)
- Biggest away win: Paya Lebar Punggol 0-5 Tampines Rovers (29 June 2005); Balestier Khalsa 0-5 Home United (30 August 2005); (China) Sinchi FC 0-5 Tampines Rovers (24 September 2005)
- Highest scoring: Home United 4-4 Geylang United (1 March 2005); Tampines Rovers 3-5 Singapore Armed Forces (13 August 2005); Tampines Rovers 3-5 Home United (21 October 2005)

2005 S.League was the tenth season of Singapore's professional football league. It was won by Tampines Rovers, which was their second league title.

== Changes from 2004 ==
- Paya Lebar Punggol joined the league in place of Sinchi FC.
- Tanjong Pagar United withdrew from the S.League from the 2005 season.

== Foreign players ==
Each club is allowed to have up to a maximum of 4 foreign players.

Club	Player 1	Player 2	Player 3	Player 4	Former Player
Balestier Khalsa	(Japan) Akihiro Nakamura	(Cameroon) Paul Ekollo	(Nigeria) Osagie Ederaro	(Cameroon) Kengne Ludovick	None
Geylang International	(Thailand) Pitipong Kuldilok	(England) Mark Williams	(England) John Wilkinson	(Nigeria) Chimaobi Nwaogazi	None
Home United	(Thailand) Sutee Suksomkit	(Thailand) Surachai Jaturapattarapong	(Thailand) Anurak Srikerd	(Brazil) Peres De Oliveira	None
Paya Lebar Punggol	(Cameroon) Moudourou Moise	(South Korea) Bae Jin-soo	(Cameroon) Protais Bessala	(Serbia and Montenegro) Kenan Ragipović	None
SAFFC	(Thailand) Therdsak Chaiman	(Australia) Aleksandar Đurić	(Guinea) Boubacar Keita	(Nigeria) Greg Nwokolo	None
Tampines Rovers	(Thailand) Santi Chaiyaphurk	(Serbia and Montenegro) Sead Muratović	(Serbia and Montenegro) Fahrudin Mustafić	(Croatia) Branko Hucika	None
Woodlands	(South Korea) Park Tae-won	(Cameroon) Essa Basile	(Romania) Lucian Dronca	(Australia) Jon Angelucci	(England) Mark Williams
(Singapore) Young Lions FC	(Nigeria) Precious Emuejeraye	None	None	None	(Nigeria) Greg Nwokolo

- Albirex Niigata (S) and Sinchi FC are not allowed to hire any foreigners.

== League table ==
Pos	Team	Pld	W	D	L	GF	GA	GD	Pts	Qualification
1	Tampines Rovers	27	18	3	6	77	35	+42	57	Qualification to AFC Cup Group Stage
2	Singapore Armed Forces	27	15	7	5	54	41	+13	52	
3	Woodlands Wellington	27	15	5	7	57	44	+13	50	
4	Home United	27	14	4	9	62	44	+18	46	Qualification to AFC Cup Group Stage (Note: Qualified as 2005 Singapore Cup winners)
5	(Japan) Albirex Niigata (S)	27	12	8	7	50	33	+17	44	
6	(Singapore) Young Lions	27	12	6	9	44	37	+7	42	
7	Balestier Khalsa	27	10	6	11	45	52	−7	36	
8	Geylang United	27	7	5	15	38	57	−19	26	
9	(China) Sinchi FC	27	7	3	17	27	56	−29	21 (Note: Sinchi deducted three points for gross misconduct)	
10	Paya Lebar Punggol	27	1	1	25	23	78	−55	4	

Source: RSSSF
Rules for classification: 1) points; 2) goal difference; 3) number of goals scored

== Top scorers ==
Rank	Name	Club	Goals
1	(Croatia) Mirko Grabovac	Tampines Rovers	26
2	(Cameroon) Kengne Ludovick	Balestier Khalsa	20
2	Indra Sahdan Daud	Home United	20
2	(Brazil) Egmar Goncalves	Home United	20
2	Noh Alam Shah	Tampines Rovers	20
5	(Australia) Jonathon Angelucci	Woodlands Wellington	18
6	(Australia) Aleksandar Duric	Singapore Armed Forces	17
7	(England) John Wilkinson	Geylang United	15
8	(Japan) Issey Farran Nakajima	Albirex Niigata (S)	14
9	(Nigeria) Osagie Ederaro	Balestier Khalsa	13
9	(Thailand) Therdsak Chaiman	Singapore Armed Forces	13
11	(Brazil) Peres De Oliveira	Home United	11
11	(Serbia) Sead Muratovic	Tampines Rovers	11
15	(Japan) Norikazu Murakami	Clementi Khalsa	9
15	(South Korea) Park Tae-won	Woodlands Wellington	9
