= List of Singapore international footballers born outside Singapore =

This is a list of Singaporean international footballers who were born outside of Singapore. Players born in countries other than Singapore including those born in diaspora may qualify for the Singapore team through Singaporean parents or grandparents or through residency in Singapore and subsequent naturalisation as Singaporean citizens.

== List of naturalised players who have appeared for the Singapore national team ==
The following players were naturalized and have go on to play for the National Team.

	Name	Date of Birth	Original nationality	Year naturalised	Caps	Goals
1	Mirko Grabovac	19 September 1971 (age 55)	CRO	2001	12	0
2	Egmar Gonçalves	15 August 1970 (age 56)	BRA	2002	15	4
3	Daniel Bennett	7 January 1978 (age 48)	ENG	2002	146	7
4	Agu Casmir	23 March 1984 (age 42)	NGR	2004	42	15
5	Itimi Dickson	14 November 1983 (age 43)	NGR	2004	33	4
6	Shi Jiayi	2 September 1983 (age 43)	CHN	2005	69	8
7	Fahrudin Mustafić	17 April 1981 (age 45)	SER	2006	87	8
8	Bah Mamadou	31 October 1979 (age 47)	MLI	2006	1	0
9	Precious Emuejeraye	7 April 1983 (age 43)	NGR	2006	61	0
10	Aleksandar Đurić	12 August 1970 (age 56)	BIH	2007	53	24
11	John Wilkinson	24 August 1979 (age 47)	ENG	2007	29	4
12	Qiu Li	6 June 1981 (age 45)	CHN	2008	27	2
13	Song Ui-young	8 November 1993 (age 33)	KOR	2021	25	4
14	Kyoga Nakamura	25 April 1996 (age 30)	JPN	2024	2	0

== List of players who have chosen to play for the Singapore national team ==
The following players have chosen to represent Singapore and are eligible to represent other countries (i.e. parent's original country, country of birth etc.)

	Name	Date of birth	Other nationality	Caps	Goals
Confirmed (with source)
1	Jacob Mahler	10 April 2000 (age 26)	DEN	12	3
2	Amy Recha	13 April 1992 (age 34)	IDN	13	0
3	Ruzaini Zainal	17 October 1988 (age 38)	MYS	4	0
