= Sairol Sahari =

Bruneian footballer

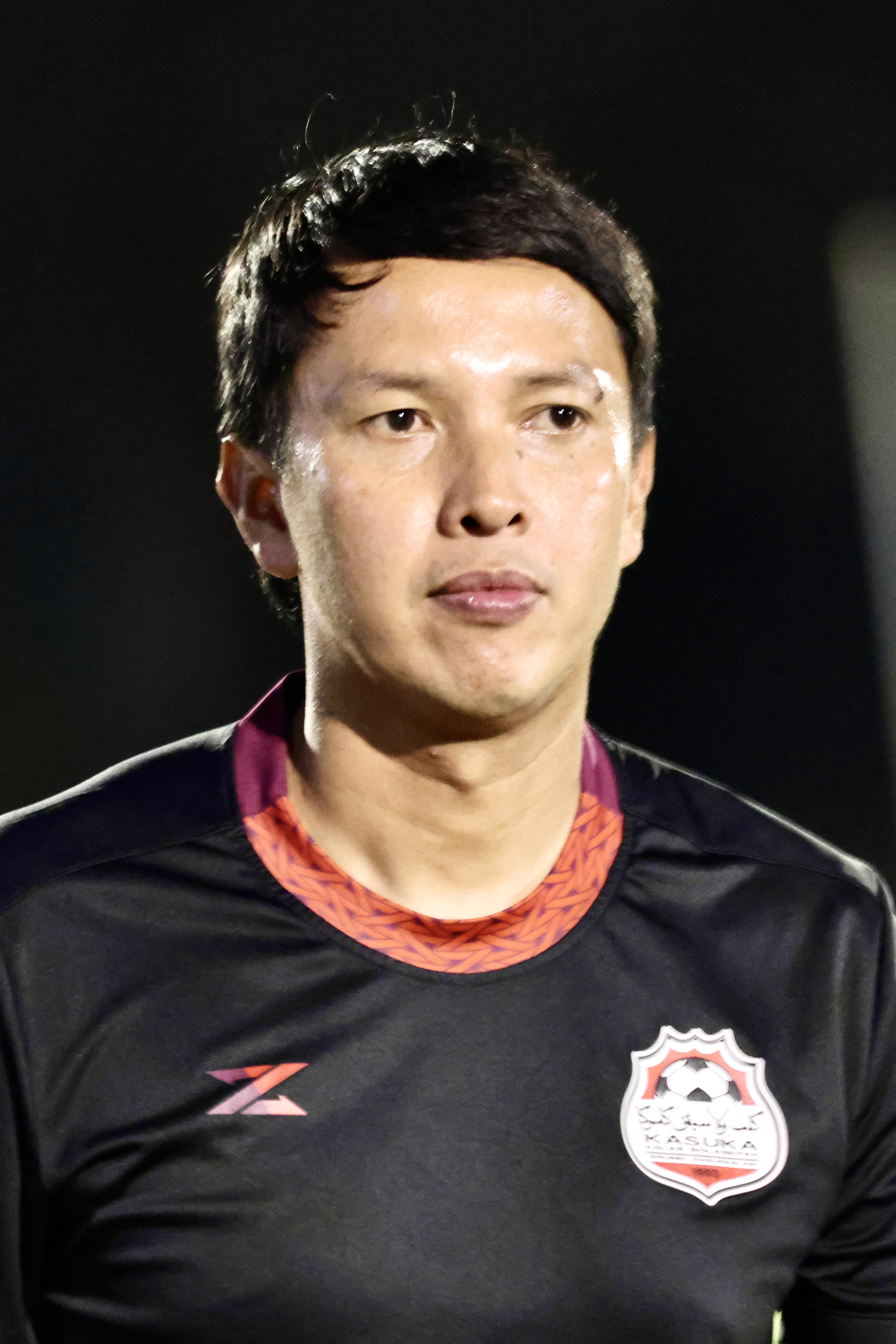
- Sairol with Kasuka in 2024

Personal information
- Full name: Sairol bin Haji Sahari
- Date of birth: 9 April 1983 (age 43)
- Place of birth: Bandar Seri Begawan, Brunei
- Height: 1.74 m (5 ft 8 1/2 in)
- Position: Defender

Team information
- Current team: Kasuka (Assistant coach)

Senior career*
Years	Team	Apps	(Gls)
1999–2004	Kasuka		
2002–2004	Brunei		(0)
2004–2006	NBT		
2006–2016	DPMM	113+	(0+)
2010–2011	→ Indera (loan)		
2017–2022	Kasuka		(2)

International career^{‡}
2000–2002	Brunei U20		
2001	Brunei U23	1	(0)
2002–2005	Brunei U21		
2003–2019	Brunei	11	(0)

Managerial career
- 2023–: Kasuka (assistant)
- 2025–: Brunei (assistant)
- * Club domestic league appearances and goals as of 11 July 2023 ‡ National team caps and goals as of 7 August 2022

Sairol bin Haji Sahari (born 9 April 1983) is a Bruneian retired footballer who played as a defender. He is currently an assistant coach at Kasuka FC.

== Club career ==
Sairol began his career as a young left-sided midfielder for the Brunei team which played in the Malaysian league system. After leaving the country's representative side in 2004, he helped NBT FC gain promotion to the domestic top flight, serving as captain. He moved to DPMM FC in 2006 when the club had entered the Malaysia Premier League in Brunei FA's place. He was sent on loan to Indera SC in 2010 while DPMM was prevented from playing in the S.League due to a FIFA suspension of Brunei.

On 25 April 2016, Sairol suffered an anterior cruciate ligament injury in training and was absent for the remaining 2016 S.League season.

Sairol has since joined Kasuka FC as assistant coach for the 2017 Brunei Super League, with a view to returning to action in the next year. He registered as a player for Kasuka for the 2018-19 season and has impressed since, scoring against Najip-BAKES and Indera SC.

Sairol led Kasuka all the way to the final of the 2022 Brunei FA Cup where they were beaten by his former club DPMM FC 2–1 on 4 December. That was to be his final game of his career.

== International career ==
Still 18 years of age, Sairol was chosen to represent Brunei at the 2001 SEA Games held in Kuala Lumpur, and made his sole appearance against the hosts and only lasting about half-an-hour. Sairol then played for the under-21s at the 2002 and 2005 Hassanal Bolkiah Trophy.

Sairol made his international debut for the Wasps in 2008 (he was an unused substitute in the 2004 Asian Cup qualifying matches), when his club side DPMM was sent as the nation's representatives at the 2008 AFF Suzuki Cup qualification held in Cambodia. Brunei failed to qualify after one win and one draw. He was picked for the next two qualification rounds in 2012 and 2014.

In May 2019 Sairol was recalled to the national team by Robbie Servais for the two-legged 2022 World Cup qualification games, five years since his last involvement with the Wasps. He was appointed captain of the team and started at centre-back for both home and away against Mongolia. Brunei were beaten 2–3 on aggregate and thus failed to qualify to the next round.

== Honours ==
=== Team ===
NBT FC

- B-League Premier Two: 2004

Brunei DPMM FC

- S.League: 2012 Runner-Up, 2014 Runner-Up, 2015
- Singapore League Cup (3): 2009, 2012, 2014
