= Masrezwan Masturi =

Singaporean footballer

Personal information
- Full name: Masrezwan bin Masturi
- Date of birth: 17 February 1981 (age 45)
- Place of birth: Singapore
- Height: 1.70 m (5 ft 7 in)
- Position: Forward

Team information
- Current team: Home United

Senior career*
Years	Team	Apps	(Gls)
2001–2002	SAFFC	38	(15)
2003	Young Lions	24	(6)
2004–2006	Woodlands Wellington	74	(14)
2007	SAFFC	20	(6)
2008–2011	Geylang United	28	(10)
2011–2013	Home United	78	(12)
2014	Tanjong Pagar United	9	(1)
2014–2015	Home United		

International career^{‡}
2002–	Singapore	22	(2)

Managerial career
- 2021–2023: Lion City Sailors U10
- 2023-: Tampines Rovers U15
- * Club domestic league appearances and goals as of May 20, 2008 ‡ National team caps and goals as of May 12, 2011

Masrezwan bin Masturi (born 17 February 1981) is a Singaporean footballer currently playing for Home United in the S.League.

== Club career ==
Masrezwan started his career with Woodlands Wellington, before moving to Singapore Armed Forces during his National Service days, and eventually becoming a member of the pioneer squad of the Young Lions (Singapore football team) in 2003.

He returned to Woodlands in 2004 and helped his club to gain 3rd position in the S.League in 2005. The Rams made it into the final of the Singapore Cup, where Masrezwan came on as a 59th-minute substitute for Park Tae-Won in a match which Woodlands lost 3-2.

In 2007, Masrezwan returned to the Warriors where he failed to make an impact. Faced with heavy competition from fellow forwards Ashrin Shariff, Norikazu Murakami as well as attacking midfielders Therdsak Chaiman and John Wilkinson, Masrezwan could only manage 20 appearances (majority as substitutes) in the entire season. He requested for a transfer even though the club managed to win the S-League and Singapore Cup double.

Masrezwan transferred to Geylang United for the 2008 S.League season, in hopes of reviving his career. At Geylang, he immediately established himself as a regular in the starting 11, and the first choice striker in the club. This new motivation has enabled Masrezwan to become the club's top scorer of the season as of May. However, Masrezwan injured his anterior cruciate ligament in training and thus finished the season as the club's third highest scorer with only ten goals.

In June 2011, he moved while the mid-season transfer window to Home United.

Masrezwan has notched up eight league goals so far in the 2009 season of the S.League since returning from injury, and his return to prominence has seen him called up to the Singapore national football team for the Ho Chin Minh City International Football Tournament, his first call-up since 2007. He even got a goal in the tournament, against Turkmenistan.

== International career ==
Masrezwan made his debut for the Singapore national team against North Korea on 7 February 2002.

However, his international career has been marred by injuries and poor performances, most notably in the 2001 Southeast Asian Games where his miss against Thailand contributed to knock Singapore out of the competition in the group stages.

In 2004, an injury kept him out of contention for the 2004 Tiger Cup which Singapore won.

A year later, Masrezwan had his nose smashed by Malaysian defender Durahim Jamaluddin in a friendly at the National Stadium, within six minutes of coming into the friendly as a substitute. He was then substituted by Fazrul Nawaz, making his international debut, which ended in a 2-0 victory for the home team.

In 2007, Masrezwan picked up his first international medal in the 2007 AFF Championship, which Singapore won, but he did not make a single appearance in the entire competition.

His last appearance for Singapore was on 30 June 2007, coming on as a substitute for Khairul Amri in the 74th minute in a friendly against Australia.

As of 2008, despite being named in the 26-man provisional squad for a friendly against Australia and the World Cup Qualifier match against Lebanon, he did not make the final list.

Masrezwan was named as one of the 20-man national squad which will travel to Vietnam for the Ho Chin Minh City International Football Tournament in October 2009, his first call-up in nearly three years.

== National team career statistics ==
=== Goals for Senior National Team ===
#	Date	Venue	Opponent	Score	Result	Competition
1.	October 8, 2004	Singapore, Singapore	United Arab Emirates	1-2	Lost	Friendly

== Honours ==
=== International ===
Singapore

- AFF Championship: 2007
