= 2007 S.League =

S. League
- Season: 2007
- Champions: Singapore Armed Forces; 6th S.League title
- AFC Cup: Singapore Armed Forces (S.League and Singapore Cup winners); Home United (S.League runners-up)
- Matches: 198
- Goals: 617 (3.12 per match)
- Top goalscorer: Aleksandar Đurić (37)
- Biggest home win: Singapore Armed Forces 6–0 Super Reds (3 April 2007); Tampines Rovers 7–1 Young Lions (15 September 2007)
- Biggest away win: Woodlands Wellington 0–6 Singapore Armed Forces (7 April 2007)
- Highest scoring: (Japan) Albirex Niigata (S) 3-5 Singapore Armed Forces (12 June 2007); Tampines Rovers 7-1 Young Lions (15 September 2007)
- Highest attendance: 4,473; Home United 2–0 Singapore Armed Forces (18 May 2007)

2007 S.League was the twelfth season of Singapore's professional football league. It was won by Singapore Armed Forces, which was their sixth league title.

== Changes from 2006 ==
- Korean Super Reds represented the Korean community in Singapore. They were renamed Super Reds on 14 August 2007.
- Liaoning Guangyuan were a farm team of Chinese Super League club Liaoning.
- Sporting Afrique went out of operations at the end of the 2006 season after the Football Association of Singapore rejected their application to participate in the 2007 season.

== Foreign players ==
Each club is allowed to have up to a maximum of 4 foreign players.

Club	Player 1	Player 2	Player 3	Player 4	Prime League	Former Player
Balestier Khalsa	(Japan) Ryuji Sueoka	(Cameroon) Paul Ekollo	(Nigeria) Mba Vitus Onyekachi	(Nigeria) Udo Fortune	(Cameroon) Kaze Teffo Etienne	(Japan) Norikazu Murakami
Geylang International	(Thailand) Rangsan Viwatchaichok	(Timor-Leste) Adriano Quintão	(Guinea) Ballamodou Conde	(Ghana) Kim Grant	None	None
Gombak United	(Thailand) Theerawekin Seehawong	(Nigeria) Gabriel Obatola	(Nigeria) Obadin Aikhena	(Nigeria) Alfred Emuejeraye	(Nigeria) Kingsley Njoku	None
Home United	(China) Qiu Li	(Cameroon) Kengne Ludovick	(Ivory Coast) Hamed Koné	(Ivory Coast) Fodé Bangaly Diakité	None	None
Sengkang Punggol	(New Zealand) Ross McKenzie	(Australia) Jon Angelucci	(New Zealand) Cole Tinkler	None	None	None
SAFFC	(Japan) Norikazu Murakami	(Japan) Kenji Arai	(Thailand) Therdsak Chaiman	None	None	None
Tampines Rovers	(Thailand) Sutee Suksomkit	(Serbia) Sead Muratović	(Thailand) Santi Chaiyaphurk	(Brazil) Peres De Oliveira	(Thailand) Attapong Nooprom	None
Woodlands	(South Korea) Park Tae-won	(Japan) Akihiro Nakamura	(Morocco) Laakkad Abdelhadi	(Romania) Lucian Dronca	None	None
(Singapore) Young Lions	(Cameroon) Moudourou Moise	None	None	None	None	None

- Albirex Niigata (S), Liaoning Guangyuan and Super Reds are not allowed to hire any foreigners.

== League table ==
Pos	Team	Pld	W	D	L	GF	GA	GD	Pts	Qualification
1	Singapore Armed Forces	33	25	4	4	95	38	+57	79	Qualification to AFC Cup Group Stage
2	Home United	33	24	6	3	73	35	+38	78	Qualification to AFC Cup Group Stage
3	Tampines Rovers	33	24	5	4	77	32	+45	77	
4	Gombak United	33	13	9	11	54	40	+14	48	
5	(Singapore) Young Lions	33	13	8	12	45	54	−9	47	
6	Geylang United	33	10	9	14	43	44	−1	39	
7	Woodlands Wellington	33	10	13	10	47	52	−5	37 (Note: Woodlands Wellington were deducted six points for abandoning a match on 5 September)	
8	(Japan) Albirex Niigata (S)	33	9	8	16	45	49	−4	35	
9	Balestier Khalsa	33	7	8	18	44	63	−19	29	
10	(China) Liaoning Guangyuan	33	8	5	20	33	63	−30	29	
11	Sengkang Punggol	33	5	10	18	39	69	−30	25	
12	(South Korea) Super Reds	33	3	9	21	24	80	−56	18	

Source: RSSSF
Rules for classification: 1) points; 2) goal difference; 3) number of goals scored

== Statistics ==
=== Top scorers ===
Rank	Player	Club	Goals
1	(Singapore) Aleksandar Đurić	Singapore Armed Forces FC	37
