= Jiang Feng (footballer) =

Chinese footballer

Jiang Feng 姜峰
Personal information
- Date of birth: 27 February 1970 (age 56)
- Place of birth: Changchun, Jilin, China
- Height: 1.83 m (6 ft 0 in)
- Position: Midfielder

Senior career*
| Years | Team | Apps | (Gls) |
| 1988–1993 | Jilin team | | |
| 1994–1996 | Liaoning FC | 40 | (1) |
| 1997–2001 | Qianwei Huandao | 111 | (9) |
| 2002–2004 | Qingdao Etsong Hainiu | 45 | (0) |
| 2005 | Sinchi FC | 21 | (4) |
| 2006 | Jiangsu Sainty | 6 | (0) |

International career
| 1994–1997 | China | 17 | (0) |

Managerial career
- 2002–2004: Qingdao Etsong Hainiu (player-coach)
- 2005: Sinchi FC (player-coach)
- 2006: Jiangsu Sainty (player-coach)
- 2008-2009: Qingdao Jonoon (assistant)
- 2010-2012: Guangzhou Evergrande (fitness)
- 2013: China U19 (assistant)
- 2014: Dalian Aerbin (assistant)
- 2014: Chengdu Tiancheng (assistant)
- 2015: Guangzhou R&F (assistant)
- 2016-2017: Changchun Yatai (assistant)
- 2017–2018: Dalian Boyoung
- 2019: Shaanxi Chang'an Athletic (team manager)
- 2020–2022: Liaoning Shenyang Urban (assistant)
- 2023–2024: Yunnan Yukun (assistant)
- 2024–2026: Liaoning Tieren (assistant)
Medal record
Men's football
Representing China
Asian Games
| Silver medal – second place | 1994 Hiroshima | Football |
AFC U-16 Championship
| Bronze medal – third place | 1988 Thailand | Team |
- * Club domestic league appearances and goals

Jiang Feng (Chinese: 姜峰 born 27 February 1970) is a Chinese former football midfielder who played for China in the 1996 Asian Cup. He also played for Jilin team, Liaoning FC, Qianwei Huandao, Qingdao Etsong Hainiu, Sinchi FC and Jiangsu Sainty.

== Biography ==
Jiang Feng started his career playing for his local football team Jilin during the semi-professional period within Chinese football, however before the advent of full-professionalism at the start of the 1994 Chinese Jia-A League season he became one of the first transfers in the new era when he joined the reigning league title holders Liaoning FC before the start of the season. His time with Liaoning did not start well and he was caught stamping on Shanghai Shenhua player Wu Chengying, which saw him banned from the Chinese Football Association for the rest of the season. When he returned he was then part of the team that would unfortunately guide the club into the relegation zone at the end of the 1995 Chinese Jia-A League season. Despite the relegation Jiang still managed to be included into the squad that took part 1996 Asian Cup and when he returned he joined recently promoted club Qianwei Huandao to revive his career. After establishing the club as a top tier team and moving to Chongqing as they eventually renamed themselves Chongqing Lifan F.C. Jiang left the club after five seasons to join Qingdao Etsong Hainiu where he went on to win the 2002 Chinese FA Cup. Nearing the end of his career Jiang would join Sinchi FC and play in Singapore's S.League before ending his career with second tier football club Jiangsu Sainty.

== Honours ==
Jilin

- Yi League: 1990

Qingdao Etsong Hainiu

- Chinese FA Cup: 2002
