= Kaze Teffo Etienne =

Cameroonian former footballer

Personal information
- Full name: Kaze Teffo Etienne Giscard
- Date of birth: 25 February 1987 (age 39)
- Place of birth: Cameroon
- Position: Defender

Senior career*
Years	Team	Apps	(Gls)
1998–2005	Ecole de Football Brasseries		
2006–2007	Sporting Afrique		
2007–2008	Balestier Khalsa FC		
2010	Ironbound Express		
2011	Hajdúböszörményi TE	6	(0)
- * Club domestic league appearances and goals

Kaze Teffo Etienne (born 25 February 1987 in Cameroon) is a Cameroonian former footballer who played as a defender.

== Early life ==
Etienne's main ambition as a child was to be a professional footballer.

== Singapore ==
Etienne played as a fullback for Sporting Afrique's lineup in 2007.

One of Balestier Khalsa's new foreign imports named for the 2007 S.League, Etienne generally performed well for the club, even though he was not a copious scorer.
