= Rene Komar =

Croatian footballer

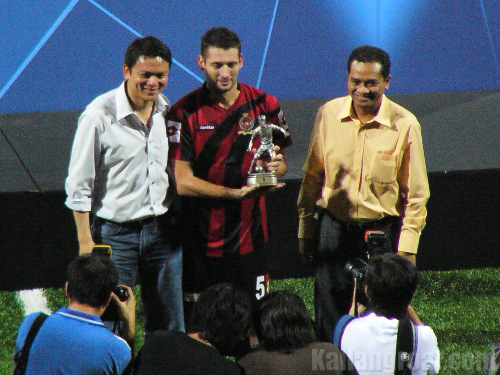
- Rene Komar with DPMM during the 2009 Singapore League Cup

Personal information
- Date of birth: 6 November 1977 (age 48)
- Place of birth: Croatia
- Position: Defender

Senior career*
Years	Team	Apps	(Gls)
2001–2005	Pomorac		
2005–2007	DPMM		(7)
2007–2008	Pomorac	0	(0)
2008–2009	DPMM	20	(1)
2010–2012	Crikvenica	68	(1)
2013–2021	Risnjak		
- * Club domestic league appearances and goals

Rene Komar (born 6 November 1977 in Croatia) is a Croatian former footballer who played as a defender.

== Club career ==
=== Pomorac ===
Komar developed at NK Pomorac 1921 where he was a mainstay in the team at their peak in their history, playing in the Prva HNL from 2001 to 2003. They were relegated that season through losing the play-offs to NK Inter Zaprešić spearheaded by a young Dinamo Zagreb loanee, Eduardo da Silva.

=== DPMM ===
Komar moved to Bruneian club DPMM FC owned by Prince Al-Muhtadee Billah in May 2005. He made his competitive debut at the year's Champions Cup on 6 May, in a pulsating 4–3 win over the Army football team where his goal in the 78th minute ignited his new team to victory from a 3–1 deficit. He scored his first league goal in the league in a 5–1 victory over NBT FC. He also featured for DPMM at the 2005 ASEAN Club Championship, going all the way to the semi-finals.

At the start of the 2005–06 Malaysia Premier League season, Brunei DPMM FC replaced the Bruneian representative side in the Malaysian league system. Under fellow Croatian Ranko Buketa, Komar and his team was promoted to the Malaysia Super League via the play-offs, overcoming Pahang in a 2–1 aggregate win. He was retained by the club for their maiden MSL season, where his stellar performances in defence helped them reach third place at the conclusion of the campaign. He was named the Player of the Year by the club. At the end of the 2006–07 season, Komar was released by the club.

Komar was recalled back to Brunei in the summer of 2008 after an administrative error scuppered a return to Pomorac in the 2007–08 season. DPMM transferred to the Singapore S.League in 2009. He scored one goal that year, in a 2–0 victory over Balestier Khalsa. Later that season, Komar was handed a 15-month ban by the Football Association of Singapore for raising his hands to the referee in a game against Home United. As a result of FIFA's suspension of Brunei, DPMM were forced to end their participation in the middle of their campaign, but not before winning the 2009 Singapore League Cup.

=== Crikvenica ===
Komar moved to NK Crikvenica of the 3. HNL West in 2010, alongside Mate Brajković. He became a regular with the team on the Croatian coast for the next three seasons, helping them consolidate their place in the Croatian third tier.

=== Risnjak ===
After a possible deal with NK Borac Bakar of the 4. HNL failed to materialise, Komar settled down at amateur side NK Risnjak in 2013 and helped the Gorski Kotar region club rise up the county leagues, winning it outright in 2015. He played for the club until the 2021–22 season.

== Honours ==
=== Team ===
DPMM

- Brunei Super Cup: 2005
- Singapore League Cup: 2009

NK Risnjak

- First County Football League: 2015

== Personal life ==
At the 20th anniversary of the establishment of DPMM FC in 2020, Komar was invited back to Brunei as a guest, the only former Croatian DPMM footballer to be given such honour.
