= Thomas Biketi =

Kenyan footballer (born 1983)

Personal information
- Full name: Thomas Wangira Biketi
- Date of birth: 31 December 1983 (age 42)
- Place of birth: Kenya
- Height: 1.79 m (5 ft 10 in)
- Position: Defender

Senior career*
Years	Team	Apps	(Gls)
2005–2006	Thika United F.C.		
2006–2007	Sporting Afrique	20	(1)
2007–2009	Arambagh Krira Sanga		
2009–2010	A.F.C. Leopards		
2010–2011	Ethiopian Coffee F.C.		
2011–2012	Jawalakhel YC		
2012	Karuturi Sports F.C.		

International career
2010	Kenya	1	(0)
- * Club domestic league appearances and goals

Thomas Biketi (born 31 December 1983 in Kenya) is a Kenyan former footballer. He has plied his trade in Kenya, Ethiopia, Bangladesh, Nepal, and Singapore. Ultimately, by late February, the Kenyan sealed the move,
