= Lucky Diokpara =

Nigerian footballer

Personal information
- Date of birth: 11 January 1987 (age 39)
- Place of birth: Nigeria

Senior career*
Years	Team	Apps	(Gls)
2006–2007	Sporting Afrique		
2013	Persisko Bangko		
- * Club domestic league appearances and goals

Lucky Diokpara (born 11 January 1987 in Nigeria) is a Nigerian former professional footballer who is last known to have played for Persisko Bangko of the Liga Indonesia Premier Division in 2013. He also played for Sporting Afrique under foreign club of Singapore Premier League in 2006.

== Career ==
Strengthening Persisko Bangko of the Liga Indonesia Premier Division in 2013, Diokpara had to miss his team host against Persih Tembilahan since his wife was pregnant. However, the Nigerian defender soon became enmeshed in a situation where Persisko did not pay him for months and he was detained at the immigration office in May that year for being suspected as an illegal immigrant.
