= Li Benjian =

Chinese footballer

Li Benjian 李本舰
Personal information
- Date of birth: March 5, 1986 (age 40)
- Place of birth: Qingdao, Shandong, China
- Height: 1.81 m (5 ft 11 in)
- Positions: Left winger; midfielder

Youth career
- 1997–2002: Guangdong Mingfeng

Senior career*
Years	Team	Apps	(Gls)
2002–2005	Guangdong Mingfeng		
2004	→ Sinchi (loan)	14	(4)
2006–2017	Tianjin TEDA	173	(6)
2008	→ Jiangsu Sainty (loan)	23	(6)
2009	→ Guangzhou Pharmaceutical (loan)	24	(0)
2018–2019	Henan Jianye	5	(0)
2021	Zibo Cuju	20	(0)
2022	Yuxi Yukun		
Medal record
Representing China
Men's football
AFC U-17 Championship
Bronze medal – third place	2002 UAE	Team
- * Club domestic league appearances and goals as of 23 May 2022

Li Benjian (simplified Chinese: 李本舰; traditional Chinese: 李本艦; pinyin: Lǐ Běnjiàn; born March 5, 1986, in Qingdao, Shandong) is a Chinese former footballer.

== Club career ==
Li Benjian would start his career playing for the second-tier football club Guangdong Mingfeng and would go on to be loaned out to Chinese football club playing in the Singapore's S.League Sinchi FC. On his return from his loan, Li would find out his club were facing financial difficulties and the club moved to Shenzhen in hopes of getting better crowds while the club changed their name to Shenzhen Kejian to represent this. The move turned out to be disappointment on and off the field as the club finished the league tenth as well as becoming bankrupt in the process. Top-tier club Tianjin TEDA were, however interested in Li's services and he transferred to them for $300,000 at the start of the 2006 league season. At Tianjin he would make his debut on March 10, 2006, in a 3–2 victory against Shenzhen Kingway. After the game he would immediately become a vital member for the club's midfield until September 10, 2006, when in a league game against Dalian Shide Li's season would end early when he tore his ankle ligaments and had to have surgery.

After he recovered Tianjin had already brought in Jozef Jarabinský as their new coach at the beginning of the 2007 league season and Li was unable to establish himself within the squad. He was loaned out to Jiangsu Sainty at the beginning of the 2008 season where he helped them in their successful bid for promotion to the Chinese Super League. Li Benjian was again loaned out, this time to top-tier club Guangzhou Pharmaceutical where he made his competitive debut on 21 March 2009 against Henan Construction which Guangzhou lost 2–1. On his return to Tianjin the club had brought in a new manager in Arie Haan who decided that Li should be the club's first choice left winger and Li would repay him by being a vital player in helping the club finish the 2010 league season in second. With the club eligible for the 2011 AFC Champions League Li would play in all seven of the club's games as they were knocked out of within the last sixteen, however the team fared better within the 2011 Chinese FA Cup when they beat Shandong Luneng 2–1 in the final.

On 27 February 2018, Li signed for Chinese Super League club Henan Jianye.

== Career statistics ==
Statistics accurate as of match played 31 December 2020.

Club	Season	League			National Cup		Continental		Other		Total	
Club	Season	Division	Apps	Goals	Apps	Goals	Apps	Goals	Apps	Goals	Apps	Goals
Sinchi FC	2004	S. League	14	4			–		–		14	4
Tianjin TEDA	2006	Chinese Super League	19	1	4	0	–		–		23	1
Tianjin TEDA	2007	Chinese Super League	0	0	–		–		–		0	0
Tianjin TEDA	2010	Chinese Super League	29	3	–		–		–		29	3
Tianjin TEDA	2011	Chinese Super League	22	1	3	0	7	0	–		32	1
Tianjin TEDA	2012	Chinese Super League	26	0	0	0	3	0	1 (Note: Appearances in Chinese FA Super Cup)	0	30	0
Tianjin TEDA	2013	Chinese Super League	25	0	2	0	-		–		27	0
Tianjin TEDA	2014	Chinese Super League	20	1	1	0	-		–		21	1
Tianjin TEDA	2015	Chinese Super League	23	0	1	0	-		–		24	0
Tianjin TEDA	2016	Chinese Super League	7	0	0	0	-		–		7	0
Tianjin TEDA	2017	Chinese Super League	2	0	0	0	-		–		2	0
Tianjin TEDA	Total		173	6	11	0	10	0	1	0	195	6
Jiangsu Sainty (loan)	2008	China League One	23	6	–		–		–		23	6
Guangzhou Pharmaceutical (loan)	2009	Chinese Super League	24	0	–		–		–		24	0
Henan Jianye	2018	Chinese Super League	5	0	1	0	–		–		6	0
Henan Jianye	2019	Chinese Super League	0	0	0	0	-		–		0	0
Henan Jianye	Total		5	0	1	0	0	0	0	0	6	0
Career total			239	16	12	0	10	0	1	0	262	16

== Honours ==
Jiangsu Sainty

- China League One: 2008

Tianjin TEDA

- Chinese FA Cup: 2011
