= Sinchi FC =

Sinchi 新麒
- Full name: Sinchi Football Club
- Founded: 2003
- Dissolved: 2006
- Ground: Jurong Stadium
- Capacity: 6,000
- Chairman: Wang Jin Hwi
- Coach: K. Jamaludeen
- League: S.League
- 2005: S.League, 9th of 10
Home colours	Away colours

Sinchi Football Club (Chinese: 新麒足球俱乐部) was a professional association football club from China based in Taman Jurong, Singapore which played as a foreign team in Singapore's S.League from 2003 to 2005. The club played its home games in Singapore at the Jurong Stadium. The team's best league finish was seventh-place in 2003. In December 2005, after three seasons, the club's management announced that they would not be participating in the S.League again in the 2006 season.

== Jiang Tao death ==
On 10 March 2004, while in an evening training session at the Jurong Stadium, Jiang Tao was struck by lightning and collapsed. Teammates tried to revive him but to no avail. The 18-year old was pronounced dead by medical personnel 10 minutes after the incident. As a tribute, all the S.League fixtures that week started with one minute silence and his family were given a solatium of 600,000 yuan by the Football Association of Singapore. The Singapore government also launched a fundraiser to support Jiang's parents and all the money generated from Sinchi FC's game tickets that week were given to them.

== Final players ==
Note: Flags indicate national team as defined under FIFA eligibility rules; some limited exceptions apply. Players may hold more than one non-FIFA nationality.

No.	Pos.	Nation	Player
1	GK	CHN	Chen Si
2	DF	CHN	Zhang Meng
3	DF	CHN	Chen Yujie
4	DF	CHN	Liang Fuming
5	MF	CHN	Cheng Lu
6	DF	CHN	Li Chuncheng
7	DF	CHN	Yu Xiaozhou
8	MF	CHN	Xie Yuxin
9	FW	CHN	Li Jianqiang
10	DF	CHN	Zhou Yi
11	MF	CHN	Liu Bin
12	FW	CHN	Zhang Zhimin
13	FW	CHN	Liu Heng
14	FW	CHN	Chen Xiao
15	FW	CHN	Liu Chifeng
16	FW	CHN	Hu Jun
17	FW	CHN	Li Xi
18	FW	CHN	Zhou Lei
19	MF	CHN	Zhong Cheng
20	DF	CHN	Zhang Haoran
21	FW	CHN	Li Xin
22	MF	SGP	Shi Jiayi
23	GK	CHN	Shi Ming
24	FW	CHN	Cheng Dong

No.	Pos.	Nation	Player
25	DF	CHN	Jiang Tao
26	FW	CHN	Zhou Fanqiang
27	DF	CHN	Zhou Fanbin
28	DF	CHN	Cheng Peizhou
29	FW	CHN	Lian Tao
30	MF	CHN	Peng Zhiyi
31	DF	CHN	Tao Yongqiang
32	DF	CHN	Tang Qifei
33	MF	CHN	Tang Cheng
34	MF	CHN	Wei Liang
35	DF	CHN	Wei Chenghui
36	FW	CHN	Wu Zigui
37	FW	CHN	Xie Linge
38	FW	CHN	Li Xiao
39	DF	CHN	Huo Haitao
40	GK	CHN	Wei Zheng
—	DF	CHN	Zhang Qinghua
—	FW	CHN	Sun Yuanfeng
—	FW	CHN	Huang Yong
—	FW	CHN	Yu Weiteng
—	MF	CHN	Li Benjian
—	GK	CHN	Lin Jun
—	MF	CHN	Li Zhen

== Seasons ==
Season	Pos	P	W	D	L	F	A	Pts	Singapore Cup
2003	7th	33	11	6–5	11	46	48	50	Quarter-finals
2004	9th	27	4	5	18	36	62	17	Semi-finals
2005	9th	27	7	3	17	27	56	21	Quarter-finals

- 2003 saw the introduction of penalty shoot-outs if a match ended in a draw in regular time. Winners of penalty shoot-outs gained two points instead of one.

== Notable former players ==
- (Singapore) Shi Jiayi
- (Singapore) Qiu Li
- (China) Xie Yuxin
- (China) Jiang Feng
- (China) Zhang Meng
- (China) Li Benjian
- (China) Jiang Tao
