= Lukmon Anifaloyin =

Nigerian footballer

Personal information
- Full name: Lukmon Anifaloyin Ayodeji
- Date of birth: 22 December 1986 (age 39)
- Place of birth: Nigeria
- Position: Defender

Senior career*
Years	Team	Apps	(Gls)
2006–2007	Sporting Afrique		
2008	Fawkner Blues	15	(0)
- South Melbourne FC
- Whittlesea Ranges
	Preston Lions FC	98	(10)
2017–2018	Lalor United		
- * Club domestic league appearances and goals

Lukmon Anifaloyin (born 22 December 1986) is a Nigerian former footballer who played as a defender.

== Career ==
One of South Melbourne's new imports for the 2010 Singapore Cup, Anifaloyin was handed his first start in a 3–1 first-leg quarterfinal loss to Bangkok Glass.

With Whittlesea Ranges, the defender was crowned the Best and Fairest for his impartiality in the FFV State League 2 North-West, with 18 votes. He then arrived at Preston Lions in 2014, before committing to stay at Lalor United for 2018.
