= 2008 Singapore Cup =

Tournament details
- Country: Singapore
- Dates: May 2008 - November 2008
- Teams: 16

Final positions
- Champions: SAFFC
- Runners-up: Woodlands Wellington

Tournament statistics
- Top goal scorer(s): (Singapore) Indra Sahdan Daud (4 goals) (Singapore) Aleksandar Đurić (4 goals)

The 2008 edition of the Singapore Cup soccer competition was officially known as the RHB Singapore Cup (due to RHB Bank's sponsorship). It was the 11th staging of the annual Singapore Cup tournament.

The competition began on 6 May 2008, with 12 S.League clubs and 4 invited foreign teams from Thailand (2 teams), Cambodia (1) and Brunei (1). The cup was a single-elimination tournament, with all sixteen teams playing from the first round. The first round involved one-off matches. Subsequent rounds involved ties of two legs.

The final (single-leg) was played on 28 November 2008, and SAFFC beat Woodlands Wellington 2–1, with the deciding goal scored by Kenji Arai in the first period of extra-time.

== Teams ==
- (Japan) Albirex Niigata (S)
- Balestier Khalsa
- (Thailand) Bangkok University
- (China) Dalian Shide
- (Brunei) DPMM FC
- Geylang United
- Gombak United
- Home United FC
- (Cambodia) Phnom Penh Empire
- Sengkang Punggol FC
- Singapore Armed Forces FC (SAFFC)
- (South Korea) Super Reds
- Tampines Rovers
- (Thailand) Tobacco Monopoly
- Woodlands Wellington FC
- (Singapore) Young Lions FC (FAS under-23 team)

== Knockout stage ==
=== Bracket ===
First knockout round
(South Korea) Super Reds (AET)	2
Geylang United	1
SAFFC	2
Balestier Khalsa	0
(China) Dalian Shide	1
Home United	5
Sengkang Punggol	1(3)
Tampines Rovers (P)	1(4)
Gombak United	0
(Thailand) Tobacco Monopoly	1
Woodlands Wellington	1
(Brunei) DPMM FC	0
(Japan) Albirex Niigata (S)	1
(Thailand) Bangkok University	4
(Singapore) Young Lions FC	2
(Cambodia) Phnom Penh Empire	0

Quarter-finals
(South Korea) Super Reds	1	0	1
SAFFC	1	3	4
Home United	1	0	1
Tampines Rovers	0	2	2
(Thailand) Tobacco Monopoly	0	1	1 (2)
Woodlands Wellington	0	1	1 (4)
(Thailand) Bangkok University	0	0	0
(Singapore) Young Lions FC	1	0	1

Semi-finals
SAFFC	2	2	4
Tampines Rovers	0	0	0
Woodlands Wellington	1	3	4
(Singapore) Young Lions FC	2	1	3

Final
SAFFC (AET)	2
Woodlands Wellington	1

=== First knockout round ===
The draw for the first knockout round was held on Friday, 5 April 2008 in Singapore. The first round matches started on 6 May.

May 6, 2008
19:45

(Singapore) Young Lions FC	2 – 0	(Cambodia) Phnom Penh Empire
Isa Halim 35', Yan Minghao 45'	Report

Jalan Besar Stadium
Attendance: 1,803
Referee: P Pandian

May 7, 2008
19:45

(China) Dalian Shide	1 – 5	Home United
Bi Jinhao 15'	Report	Indra Sahdan 32', (Pen.) 35', 37', 60', Kengne Ludovick 62'

Queenstown Stadium
Attendance: 1,929
Referee: Abas Daud

May 8, 2008
19:45

SAFFC	2 – 0	Balestier Khalsa
Norikazu Murakami 40'; Mustaqim Manzur 90'	Report

Choa Chu Kang Stadium
Attendance: 2,085
Referee: T Aravinthan

May 9, 2008
19:30

Woodlands Wellington	1 – 0	(Brunei) DPMM FC
Akihiro Nakamura 38'	Report

Woodlands Stadium
Attendance: 1,556
Referee: John Chia

May 10, 2008
19:45

Gombak United	0 – 1	(Thailand) Tobacco Monopoly
	Report	Saksit Vutthipadadorn 81'

Jurong West Stadium
Attendance: 1,614
Referee: Abdul Malik Bashir

May 11, 2008
19:45

(Japan) Albirex Niigata (S)	1 – 4	(Thailand) Bangkok University
Akira Takase 75'	Report	Suriya Domtaisong 24', 54'; Nopphon Phon-Udom 27'; Suppasek Kaikaew 39'

Jurong East Stadium
Attendance: 1,733
Referee: S Kumar

May 12, 2008
19:45

(South Korea) Super Reds	2 – 1 (AET)	Geylang United
Choi Young Min 89', 101'	Report	Rastislav Belicak 90'

Yishun Stadium
Attendance: 1,416
Referee: T Aravinthan

May 13, 2008
19:45

Sengkang Punggol	1 – 1	Tampines Rovers
Zdravko Simic 88'	Report	Sutee Suksomkit 25'
Penalties
Ali Imran Lomri (penalty scored); Ivan Cesar Asenjo (penalty missed); Zdravko Simic (penalty scored); Hiroyuki Yamamoto (penalty missed); Winston Yap (penalty scored); Firdaus Salleh (penalty missed)	3 – 4	(penalty scored) Sutee Suksomkit; (penalty scored) Fahrudin Mustafic; (penalty scored) Zulkarnaen Zainal; (penalty missed) Shariff Abdul Samat; (penalty missed) Ridhuan Muhammad; (penalty scored) Fathi Yunus

Hougang Stadium
Attendance: 1,240
Referee: Muhd Taqi

=== Quarter-finals ===
First Legs

July 4, 2008
19:30

(Thailand) Tobacco Monopoly	1 – 1	Woodlands Wellington
Jetsada Jitsawad 74'	Report	L Dronca (Pen) 61'

Jurong West Stadium
Attendance: 1,364
Referee: P Pandian

July 9, 2008
19:45

Tampines Rovers	0 – 1	Home United
	Report	Shahril Ishak 31'

Tampines Stadium
Attendance: 2,951
Referee: John Chia

July 10, 2008
19:45

(South Korea) Super Reds	1 – 1	SAFFC
Seo Su Jong 74'	Report	Kenji Arai 57'

Yishun Stadium
Attendance: 1,042
Referee: T Aravinthan

July 8, 2008
19:45

(Thailand) Bangkok University	0 – 1	(Singapore) Young Lions FC
	Report	D Hammond 90'

Jurong East Stadium
Attendance: 1,444
Referee: Abas Daud

Second Legs

July 7, 2008
19:45

Woodlands Wellington	0 – 0 (A.E.T)	(Thailand) Tobacco Monopoly
	Report
Penalties
Jerry Bartholomeusz (penalty scored); Zahid Ahmad (penalty missed); Akihiro Nakamura (penalty scored); Fadzuhasny Juraimi (penalty scored); Lucian Dronca (penalty scored)	4 – 2	(penalty scored) Worawut Wangsawat; (penalty scored) Khwanchai Fuangprakob; (penalty missed) Somchai Hanaeng; (penalty missed) Pradit Taweechai

Woodlands Stadium
Attendance: 1,771
Referee: S Kumar
- Woodlands Wellington progressed after winning 4 – 2 on penalties

July 11, 2008
19:30

(Singapore) Young Lions FC	0 – 0	(Thailand) Bangkok University
	Report

Jalan Besar Stadium
Attendance: 2,226
Referee: Abdul Malik Bashir
- Young Lions progressed after winning 1 – 0 on aggregate

August 17, 2008
19:45

Home United	0 – 2	Tampines Rovers
	Report	Qiu Li 40'; Fahrudin Mustafic 45'

Bishan Stadium
Attendance: 1,014
Referee: John Chia
- Tampines Rovers progressed after winning 2 – 1 on aggregate

August 18, 2008
19:45

SAFFC	3 – 0	(South Korea) Super Reds
Aleksandar Duric 5', 86'; Joo Ki Hwan (o.g) 57'	Report

Choa Chu Kang Stadium
Attendance: 2,356
Referee: Abdul Malik Bashir
- SAFFC progressed after winning 4 – 1 on aggregate

=== Semifinals ===
First Legs

August 21, 2008
19:45

Woodlands Wellington FC	1 – 2	(Singapore) Young Lions FC
Lucian Dronca 11'	Report	Obadin Aikhena 33'; Fadhil Noh 57'

Woodlands Stadium
Attendance: 1,641
Referee: Leow Thiam Hoe

August 22, 2008
19:30

SAFFC	2 – 0	Tampines Rovers
Ahmad Latiff Khamaruddin 45'; Norikazu Murakami 67'	Report

Choa Chu Kang Stadium
Attendance: 1,951
Referee: Abas Daud

Second Legs

August 24, 2008
19:45

(Singapore) Young Lions FC	1 – 3	Woodlands Wellington
Irwan Shah 40'	Report	A Laakkad 8', (Pen.) 86'; Ismail Yunos (o.g.) 18'

Jalan Besar Stadium
Attendance: 1,350
Referee: Sukhbir Singh
- Woodlands Wellington progressed after winning 4 – 3 on aggregate

August 25, 2008
19:30

Tampines Rovers	0 – 2	SAFFC
	Report	Aleksandar Duric 66', 85'

Tampines Stadium
Attendance: 1,696
Referee: P Pandian
- SAFFC progressed after winning 4-0 on aggregate

=== 3rd-place Playoff ===
November 20, 2008
19:45

(Singapore) Young Lions FC	3 – 3	Tampines Rovers
Goh Swee Swee 41'; Fadhil Noh 60'; Daniel Hammond (Pen.) 71'	Report	Khairul Amri 40'; Fahrudin Mustafic (Pen.) 67'; Sutee Suksomkit 85'
Penalties
Daniel Hammond (penalty scored); Goh Swee Swee (penalty scored); Hafiz Abu Sujad (penalty missed); Afiq Yunos (penalty missed); Ashley Ow (penalty missed)	2 – 3	(penalty missed) Sutee Suksomkit; (penalty scored) Fahrudin Mustafic; (penalty scored) Santi Chaiyaphuak; (penalty scored) Zulkarnaen Zainal

Jalan Besar Stadium
Attendance: 1,109
Referee: P Pandian

=== Final ===
November 21, 2008
19:30

SAFFC	2 – 1 (A.E.T)	Woodlands Wellington
Shaiful Esah 45'; Kenji Arai 102'	Report	Fadzuhasny Juraimi 79'

Jalan Besar Stadium
Attendance: 5,022
Referee: T Aravinthan

== Top scorers ==
Rank	Player	Club	Goals
1	(Singapore) Indra Sahdan Daud	Home United	4
=	(Singapore) Aleksandar Đurić	SAFFC	4

== See also ==
- Singapore Cup
- S.League
- Singapore League Cup
- Singapore Charity Shield
- Football Association of Singapore
- List of football clubs in Singapore
