= Lipac =

Lipac Липац
- Village
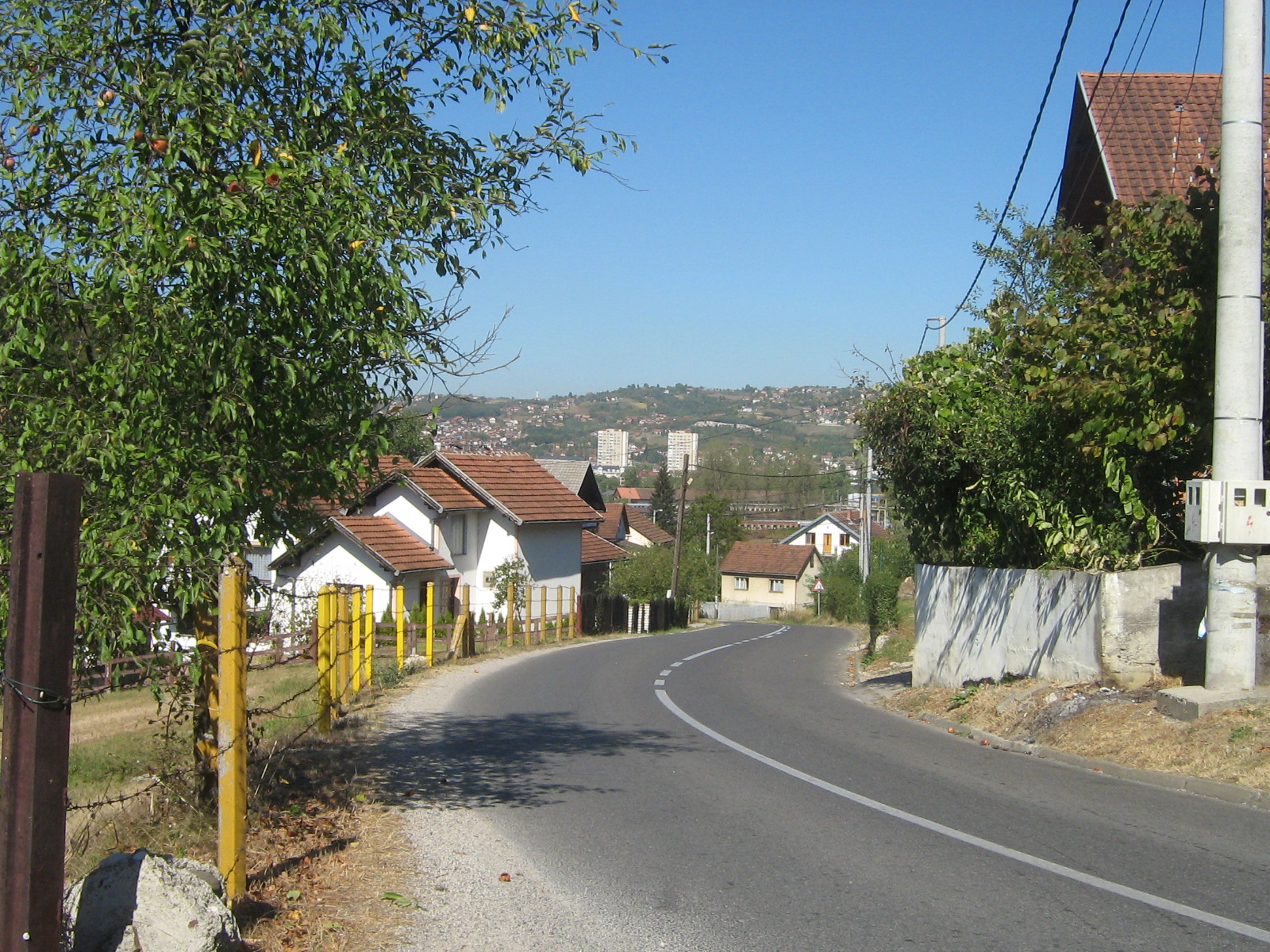

- Location within Bosnia and Herzegovina
- Coordinates: 44°43′2″N 18°6′48″E
- Country: Bosnia and Herzegovina
- Entity: Republika Srpska
- Municipality: Doboj
- Time zone: UTC+1 (CET)
  - Summer (DST): UTC+2 (CEST)

Lipac (Serbian Cyrillic: Липац) is a village in the municipality of Doboj, Republika Srpska, Bosnia and Herzegovina. It is inhabited by ethnic Serbs.

== Notable people ==
- Aleksandar Đurić (born 1970), Bosnian-born Singaporean footballer.
