= Pradit Taweechai =

Thai footballer (born 1979)

Personal information
- Full name: Pradit Taweechai
- Date of birth: 7 February 1979 (age 47)
- Place of birth: Chaiyaphum, Thailand
- Height: 1.77 m (5 ft 9 1/2 in)
- Positions: Center back; right back

Senior career*
Years	Team	Apps	(Gls)
2004–2005	Persib Bandung	67	(8)
2005–2008	Tampines Rovers FC	59	(2)
2009–2013	TTM Chiangmai		
2014	Krung Thonburi		

International career
2004–2007	Thailand	26	(1)
- * Club domestic league appearances and goals as of 14 November 2008

Pradit Taweechai (Thai: ประดิษฐ์ ทวีไชย) is a retired professional footballer from Thailand. He is credited for being the first Thailand player as well as foreign Asian player to play for Persib Bandung (2004–05). Persib later continued signing thai players, such as, Kosin Hathairattanakool, Nipont Chanarwut, and Suchao Nuchnum.
