= Ashrin Shariff =

Singaporean footballer

Personal information
- Full name: Ashrin Shariff
- Date of birth: 10 October 1982 (age 44)
- Place of birth: Singapore
- Height: 1.78 m (5 ft 10 in)
- Position: Striker

Team information
- Current team: Borussia Zamrud
- Number: 18

Senior career*
Years	Team	Apps	(Gls)
2001	Marine Castle	33	(9)
2002	Singapore Armed Forces	3	(0)
2003	→Young Lions(loan)	7	(1)
2003–2004	Singapore Armed Forces	38	(15)
2005	Young Lions	18	(7)
2006–2008	Singapore Armed Forces	26	(14)
2009	Geylang United	0	(0)

International career^{‡}
?	Singapore	12	(1)
- * Club domestic league appearances and goals as of 1 February 2007 ‡ National team caps and goals as of 1 February 2007

Ashrin Shariff (born 10 October 1982) is a Singaporean former professional footballer.

== Club career ==
Ashrin was part of the Singapore Armed Forces Football Club squad which won the S.League title three consecutive years from 2006 to 2008, along with the Singapore Cup in 2007 and 2008.

For the 2009 season, Ashrin has left to Warriors to rejoin former team-mate Masrezwan Masturi at Geylang United.

For 2010, Ashrin will be playing with amateur club Borrussia Zamrud FC in FAS NFL Division 2.

== National team career statistics ==
=== Goals for senior national team ===
#	Date	Venue	Opponent	Score	Result	Competition
1.	27 June 2007	Singapore	Saudi Arabia	1–2	Lost	Friendly
