= Jiang Tao (footballer, born 1985) =

Chinese footballer

Personal information
- Date of birth: 2 September 1985
- Place of birth: Jilin, China
- Date of death: 10 March 2004 (aged 18)
- Place of death: Jurong Stadium, Jurong, Singapore
- Height: 1.88 m (6 ft 2 in)
- Position: Defender

Youth career
- Jilin Institute of Physical Education
- 2001–2004: Sinchi FC

Senior career*
Years	Team	Apps	(Gls)
2004	Sinchi FC		
- * Club domestic league appearances and goals

Jiang Tao (Mandarin: 江涛 2 September 1985 – 10 March 2004) was a Chinese footballer who played for Sinchi FC in the S.League.

== Background ==
Raised in Antu County, Jilin, Jiang Tao played basketball at an early age but always had a predilection to football, later entering the Jilin Institute of Physical Education and becoming one of coach Zhang Yuanqing's favorite players. Competing in the Under-17 National Football Championship with his school, he steered them to a 9th-place finish out of 32 teams. Jiang's father was a government official and his mother ran a grocery. On November 16, 2001, the Jilin Institute of Physical education was visited by a deputation from Sinchi FC to recruit players. Enticed by the idea of playing abroad and studying at the same time, Jiang agreed to go and his family providentially had the wherewithal to pay for the stint, which costed over 100,000 yuan.

== Sinchi FC ==
Originally in the third team, the defender was promoted to the clubs Prime League and S.League teams by 2004, starting to feature in official matches. On 10 March 2004, while in an evening training session Jiang was struck by lightning and collapsed. The 18-year old was pronounced dead by medical personnel 10 minutes after the incident. As a tribute, all the S.League fixtures that week were started with one minute's silence beforehand and his family were given a solatium of 600000 yuan by the Football Association of Singapore. The Singapore government also launched a fundraiser to support Jiang's parents and all the money generated from Sinchi FC's game tickets that week were given to them.

The former player's body was cremated on 15 March 2004.
