= Jiang Tao (engineer) =

Chinese engineer

- 姜涛
- Born: October 1963 (age 62); Suixi, Anhui, China
- Education: Central South University; University of Utah
- Scientific career
- Fields: Metal processing
- Workplaces: Central South University

Chinese name
- Simplified Chinese: 姜涛
- Traditional Chinese: 姜濤
Transcriptions
Standard Mandarin
- Hanyu Pinyin: Jiāng Tāo

Jiang Tao (born October 1963) is a Chinese engineer who is a professor at Central South University, and an academician of the Chinese Academy of Engineering.

== Biography ==
Jiang was born in Suixi (now Huaibei), Anhui, in October 1963. After graduating from Central South University in 1990, he stayed at the university and was promoted to professor in 1991. In 2000, he pursued advanced studies at the University of Utah in the United States. He returned to China in December 2002 and continued to teach at Central South University.

== Honours and awards ==
- 18 November 2021 Member of the Chinese Academy of Engineering (CAE)
