= Sporting Afrique FC =

Sporting Afrique
- Full name: Sporting Afrique Football Club
- Nickname: The Flamingos
- Founded: 2006
- Dissolved: 2007
- Ground: Yishun Stadium; Yishun, Singapore
- Capacity: 3,400
- Chairman: Collin Chee
- Manager: R. Balasubramaniam
- League: S.League
- 2006: S.League, 9th of 11

Sporting Afrique Football Club was a professional football club which played in Singapore's S.League in 2006. The squad consisted of mostly younger players from Nigeria, Cameroon, Kenya and Ghana. The S.League hoped their involvement would make the competition more exciting, and possibly unearth players who might change their nationality and play for the Singapore national football team in the future.

Sporting Afrique played in only one S.League season in 2006 as their application to play in the league in 2007 was rejected.

== History ==
Sporting Afrique started off their debut 2006 S.League season with a 2–1 win over Woodlands Wellington at the Yishun Stadium. The club finished in 9th place in their first S.League season.

Sporting Afrique's application to participate in the S.League in 2007 was rejected.

=== Controversies ===
In June 2006, it was reported that, while the players had been promised monthly salaries of S$1,600, they only received S$100 a month. Their contracts also forbade talking to the media, but team members contacted the BBC anonymously, drawing international attention. Club president Collin Chee, who had initially claimed to be "not short-changing any of them", agreed to raise salaries to S$600, with performance bonuses and better housing.

It was revealed that one of the players turned down a bribe of more than $5,000 ahead of an S-League match.

== Seasons ==
Season	Pos	P	W	D	L	F	A	Pts	Singapore Cup
2006	9th	30	5	9	16	36	58	24	Preliminary

== Notable players ==
Cameroon

- Kaze Teffo Etienne
- Jacques Ngo'o
- Christian Priso

Ghana

- Frederick Addai
- Musah Ibrahim

Kenya

- Thomas Biketi
- Harrison Muranda
- Nicholas Muyoti
- Christopher Wekesa

Nigeria

- Udo Fortune
- Lucky Diokpara
- Lukmon Anifaloyin
- Peter Lipede
- Sergio Yaale
- Obot Udoaka
- Julius Ejueyitsi
- Michael Onyia
- Segun Adebayo
- Agofure Churchill
- Kehinde Hussani Badmus
- Ferdinand Nnodim
- Ifesinachi Nwaigwe
- Nwankwo Ogochukwu
- Udorji Nzekwesi
- Samuel Umoh

Singapore

- Udo Fidelis Chika (originally of Nigerian nationality)

== Coach ==
- (Singapore) R. Balasubramaniam (2006 – 2007)
