= Osagie Ederaro =

Nigerian footballer (born 1986)

Personal information
- Date of birth: 25 August 1986 (age 39)
- Place of birth: Nigeria
- Height: 1.72 m (5 ft 8 in)
- Position: Striker

Senior career*
Years	Team	Apps	(Gls)
2005–2006	Balestier Khalsa		
?–2008	Wollongong Wolves FC		
2008–2011	Heidelberg United		
2011–2014	Green Gully	62+	(16+)
- * Club domestic league appearances and goals

Osagie Ederaro (born 25 August 1986) is a Nigerian former professional footballer who played as a striker.

== Career ==
=== Singapore ===
Released by Balestier Khalsa in winter 2005 after the expiry of his contract, Ederaro re-joined them just before the 2006 S.League season, claiming that he was satisfied there and rejecting offers from rivals Geylang, finishing with 9 goals that year.

=== Australia ===
In spring 2008, at Wollongong Wolves FC, Ederaro formed a strike partnership with Ilija Prenzoski, together scoring four goals in two weeks straight previously.

Inundated with problems relating to his rent while with Wollongong Wolves, he left the club because of this reason by September 2008.

== Honours ==
- VPL Team of the Week
- Green Gully SC Player of the Season: 2014
