= John Wilkinson (footballer, born 1979) =

English-Singaporean footballer (born 1979)

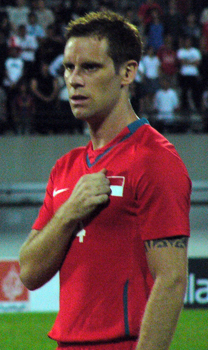
- Wilkinson lining up for Singapore in 2008

Personal information
- Full name: John Colbridge Wilkinson
- Date of birth: 24 August 1979 (age 47)
- Place of birth: Exeter, England
- Height: 1.77 m (5 ft 10 in)
- Position: Midfielder

Senior career*
Years	Team	Apps	(Gls)
1995–2001	Exeter City	20	(2)
2001–2002	Tiverton Town		
2002–2004	Woodlands Wellington	73	(26)
2005	Geylang United	26	(15)
2006–2010	Singapore Armed Forces	133	(31)
2011	Police United	8	(0)
2012	Home United	12	(0)
2013	Salgaocar	8	(0)
2013	Tanjong Pagar United	7	(0)

International career
2007–2010	Singapore	29	(4)
- * Club domestic league appearances and goals

John Colbridge Wilkinson (born 24 August 1979) is a former footballer and pundit who last played for Tanjong Pagar United FC. Born in England, he represented the Singapore national team.

== Club career ==
Born in Exeter, Wilkinson played for Exeter City, Woodlands Wellington and Geylang United before joining Singapore Armed Forces in 2006. He won 4 league titles with the club.

On 1 March 2005, Wilkinson scored 4 goals on his debut for Geylang United against Home United.

After reportedly turning down a three-year deal at SAFFC, Wilkinson joined Police United of Thailand on a two-year contract in January 2012 and became the first foreign captain in the history of the Thai Premier League. However, he failed to see out his contract at the club and signed for reigning Singapore Cup champions Home United at the beginning of the 2012 S-League season. Wilkinson then went to India to sign for Salgaocar in January 2013 until the end of the 2012–13 I-League season. On 6 June 2013, he was unveiled as Tanjong Pagar United's first signing of the mid-season window and wore the number 16 jersey.

== International career ==
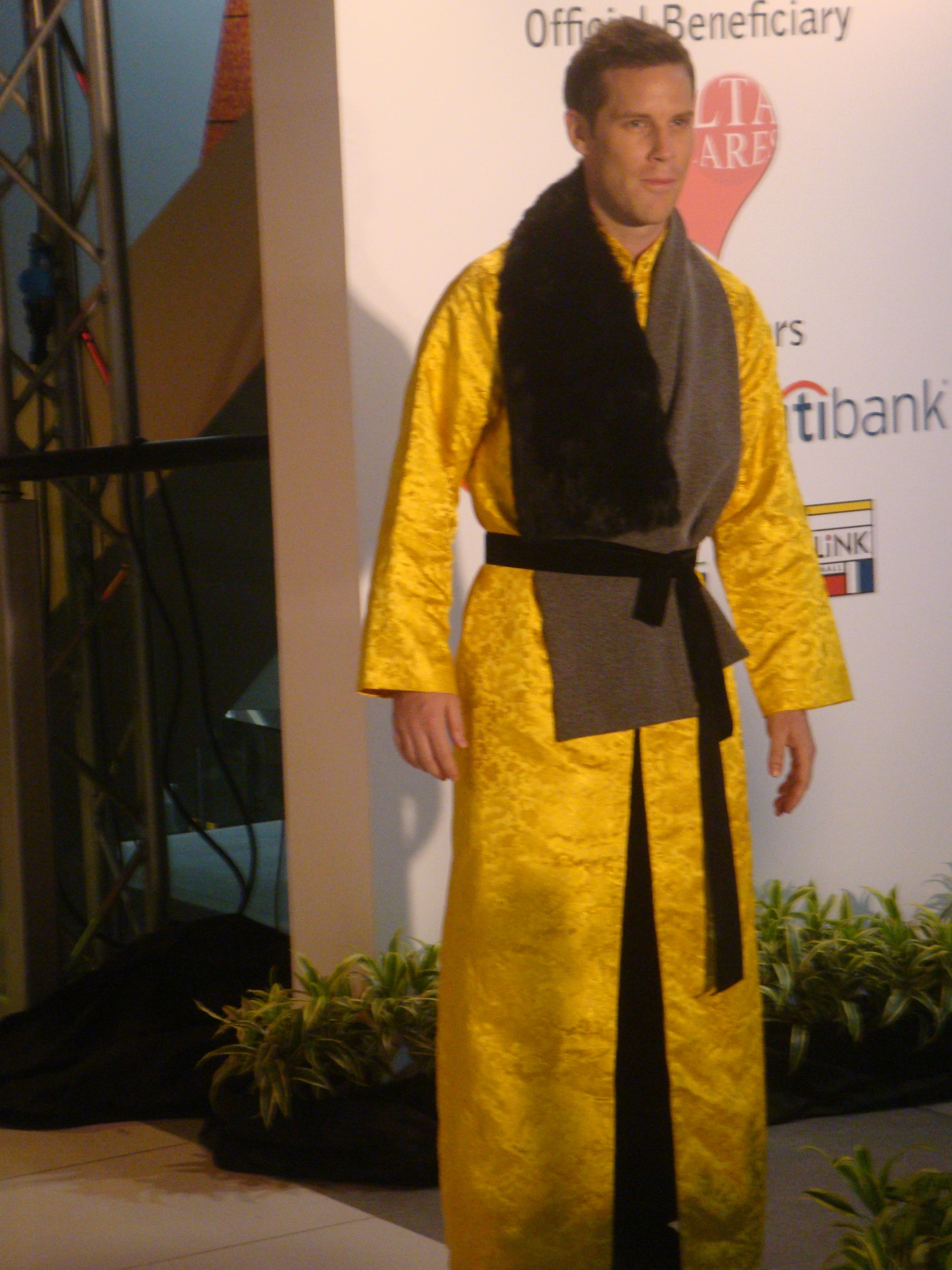
John Wilkinson at the Circle Line Stage 1 & 2 Open House

Wilkinson became a Singapore citizen after marrying a Singaporean, thus allowing him to play international football for Singapore.

He was called up to the national team (consisted of 32) for a series for friendly matches against North Korea, Saudi Arabia and Australia. He made his debut for Singapore on 24 June 2007 in the second half against North Korea and even got an assist. He scored his first international goal when he broke the deadlock in the 1–1 draw against the United Arab Emirates on 12 September 2007.

He also scored in the 4–0 win over Palestine in a 2010 World Cup qualifying match on 8 October 2007. On 2 June 2008, he scored in a 3–7 home defeat against Uzbekistan in the third round of qualifying.

In total, he scored 4 goals in 29 international games for Singapore.

=== International goals ===
#	Date	Venue	Opponent	Score	Result	Competition
1.	12 September 2007	Singapore, Singapore	United Arab Emirates	1–1	Draw	Friendly
2.	8 October 2007	Doha, Qatar	Palestine	4–0	Won	2010 FIFA World Cup qualification
3.	2 June 2008	Singapore, Singapore	Uzbekistan	3–7	Lost	2010 FIFA World Cup qualification
4.	22 June 2008	Beirut, Lebanon	Lebanon	2–1	Won	2010 FIFA World Cup Qualification

== After retirement ==
After retiring, Wilkinson works as a pundit in Singapore for Fox Sports Asia.

== Honours ==
SAFFC (Warriors FC)

- Singapore Premier League: 2006, 2007, 2008, 2009
- Singapore Cup: 2007, 2008

== See also ==
- List of Singapore international footballers born outside Singapore
