= Razaleigh Khalik =

Singaporean footballer

Personal information
- Full name: Razaleigh bin Khalik
- Date of birth: June 25, 1981 (age 45)
- Place of birth: Singapore
- Height: 1.76 m (5 ft 9 1/2 in)
- Position: Defender

Youth career
- Tampines Rovers
- Geylang United

Senior career*
Years	Team	Apps	(Gls)
2001	Geylang United	12	(0)
2002	Singapore Armed Forces FC	2	(0)
2003	Young Lions	29	(0)
2004–2007	Geylang United	86	(0)
2008–2012	Singapore Armed Forces FC	110	(0)
Total		239	(0)

International career^{‡}
2003–2005	Singapore	2	(0)
- * Club domestic league appearances and goals as of May 20, 2009 ‡ National team caps and goals as of May 20, 2009

Razaleigh bin Khalik (born 25 June 1981) is a former professional soccer player who played in the S.League and the Singapore national football team.

He is a natural centre back, though he can also play as a right full back and left full back.

== Club career ==
Razaleigh has previously played for Geylang United and Young Lions.

== International career ==
He made his debut for the Singapore against Maldives on 4 March 2003.

== Honours ==
=== Club ===
==== Geylang United ====
- S.League: 2001

==== Singapore Armed Forces ====
- S.League: 2002, 2008, 2009
- Singapore Cup: 2008
