= Aleksandar Đurić =

Association football player (born 1970)

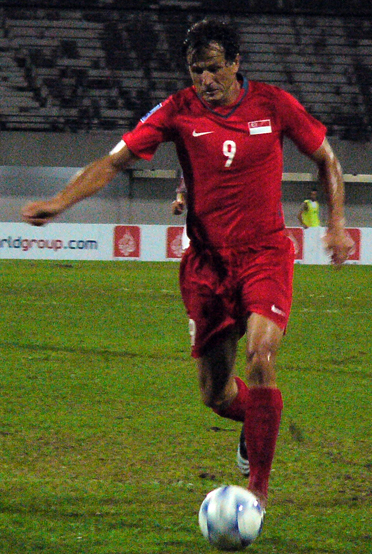
- Đurić with Singapore in 2008

Personal information
- Date of birth: 12 August 1970 (age 56)
- Place of birth: Doboj, SFR Yugoslavia
- Height: 1.92 m (6 ft 4 in)
- Position: Striker

Youth career
- 1984–1987: Sloga Doboj

Senior career*
Years	Team	Apps	(Gls)
1992–1994	Szeged LC	24	(7)
1995–1996	South Melbourne	5	(0)
1996	Port Melbourne Sharks	22	(12)
1996–1997	Gippsland Falcons	15	(4)
1997	Locomotive Shanshan	16	(2)
1997–1998	West Adelaide	8	(3)
1998	Heidelberg United	8	(2)
1998–1999	West Adelaide	27	(5)
1999	Tanjong Pagar United	16	(11)
1999–2000	Marconi Stallions	15	(2)
2000	Sydney Olympic	3	(0)
2000	Home United	10	(6)
2001–2004	Geylang United	126	(97)
2005–2009	Singapore Armed Forces	150	(129)
2010–2014	Tampines Rovers	137	(78)
Total		600	(363)

International career
2007–2012	Singapore	53 (Note: Official international record as recognised by the Football Association of Singapore, the ASEAN Football Federation and the Asian Football Confederation. According to a FIFA article, Đurić has 54 caps and 27 goals; FIFA, however, does not keep records of player appearances. See talk page for further elaboration and relevant references.)	(24)
- * Club domestic league appearances and goals

Aleksandar Đurić (Serbian Cyrillic: Александар Ђурић; born 12 August 1970) is a football coach and former player who is the principal for Sport Singapore and the ActiveSG Football Academy. A prolific striker, Ðurić was noted for his strong physical presence. His approach to fitness and a disciplined lifestyle contributed to extending a career spanning over three decades.

Đurić was a junior kayaking champion of Yugoslavia when he was 15 and was ranked 8th in the world at 17. He represented Bosnia and Herzegovina in the C-1 500m canoeing event at the 1992 Summer Olympics. After the Olympics, he returned to Hungary to resume his football career. In 1999, he signed for Tanjong Pagar United in the S.League where he was converted to a striker for the first time in his career. He won trophies with subsequent clubs Home United, Geylang United, Singapore Armed Forces and Tampines Rovers. He won eight league titles and three Singapore Cups in 15 seasons, amassing three Player of the Year and four top scorer awards on the way to becoming the league's all-time top scorer.

At international level, he debuted for Singapore at the age of 37 in 2007. He became the first foreign-born player to captain Singapore in May 2008. He was included in the Singapore squad for the AFF Championship in 2008, 2010, and 2012, the latter of which Singapore won. He retired from international football in December 2012 with a record of 24 goals in 53 matches. He was named the IFFHS World's Best Goal Scorer of the Decade for 2001 to 2010.

In November 2014, Ðurić retired from his playing career at the age of 44. After retiring from professional football, he played in the Singapore Cosmopolitan Football League, a top amateur league in Singapore.

== Early life ==
Aleksandar Đurić was born in Lipac on the outskirts of Doboj, in the Socialist Federal Republic of Yugoslavia (current Republika Srpska, Bosnia and Herzegovina). The childhood supporter of Red Star Belgrade spent his formative years in the youth teams of his hometown club FK Sloga Doboj as a goalkeeper and later, as a midfielder. He also took up kayaking at the age of 12 on the advice of the doctor treating his growth disorder of the chest. He became junior kayaking champion of Yugoslavia when he was 15 and by age 17, he was ranked 8th in the world.

Đurić was drafted into the Yugoslav People's Army (JNA) at the age of 17 and became an officer during his service. With the impending Bosnian War, his father wanted him or his brother to leave the country to preserve the family line. He was instructed to leave his hometown as he was younger and a sportsman. Đurić recalls: "My father fought in this war, my brother for almost five years and my mother was killed in 1993 by the Muslim army. They bombed our village and it hit my home directly. A really big bomb and my mother died instantly [...] So many people like me lost mothers and fathers in this bloody civil war but for me I hold no grudges. I don’t look at race, I look at people by their hearts and here in Singapore I adopted a Muslim child." With just 300 Deutsche Marks on him, Đurić left for Serbia where he played football in the second division for one season and then Sweden, where he trained with AIK and was offered refugee status which he rejected. The break-up of Yugoslavia left him stranded in Hungary without a recognised passport. He wandered through the cafes and restaurants of Szeged before a family offered him accommodation and a trial at local club Szeged LC in the second tier of the Hungarian football league.

=== 1992 Summer Olympics ===
In 1992, Đurić received an invitation from the newly formed the Olympic Committee of Bosnia and Herzegovina to compete for Bosnia and Herzegovina in the C-1 500 m canoeing event at the 1992 Summer Olympics in Barcelona. Despite not having trained for two years and the ongoing conflict between the Serbs and the Bosniaks, he accepted the request as he ultimately decided he was first and foremost a sportsman. As the Bosnian Olympic Committee could not afford to pay for his travel, he had to hitch-hike his way over 1,500 kilometres (930 mi) to Barcelona. With only a letter from the Olympic Committee and no valid passport, he managed to get a truck ride to the Austrian border but was initially refused passage by a disbelieving immigration officer who thought he was a refugee seeking asylum. After convincing them of his credentials with a phone call to the Olympic Committee, the border guards helped him persuade someone to take him half-way to Slovenia, where he managed to get another ride to the airport and flew to Barcelona. A two-day trek later, he made it to the Summer Olympics where he was one of Bosnia's ten debuting competitors. He had to borrow equipment from the Italian and Spanish teams to complete in the event and was eliminated in the repechages. After the Olympics, he resumed his football career with Szeged LC.

== Playing career ==
=== Australia ===
An associate of Đurić helped to arrange for a trial in Australia with Frank Arok, a retired Serbian footballer of Hungarian descent and former Australia coach. In 1995, he moved to South Melbourne Hellas in the National Soccer League where he played as a defender. He also played for other Australian clubs such as Port Melbourne Sharks, Gippsland Falcons, Heidelberg United, West Adelaide and had a brief stint with Chinese side Locomotive Shanshan in 1997.

In 1999, Đurić’s club West Adelaide went bankrupt. He received offers from Hong Kong and Singapore but chose to move to the latter, where he began his S.League career with Tanjong Pagar United. At this stage of his career, he had been playing on the left flank as a winger or left-back. His coach Tohari Paijan converted the 6'4" player into a striker. He scored 11 goals in 16 league matches as the club finished third.

Đurić returned to Australia at the end of the season and obtained Australian citizenship in the hope of representing the Socceroos. He played for Sydney-based Marconi Stallions, reverting to his left midfield position.

In June 2000, Đurić moved permanently to Singapore with Home United, playing as a striker again. He scored 11 goals in all competitions for his new club as he won the 2000 Singapore Cup in front of a 45,000 crowd at the National Stadium. He was released by the club at the end of the season.

=== Geylang United ===
In 2001, Đurić signed on with Geylang United where he formed a strong understanding with forward Mohd Noor Ali, a partnership they would later replicate at Singapore Armed Forces and credit with creating "at least half of all my goals". Geylang won their first S.League title in five years after defeating Jurong in the final matchday, with Đurić scoring 37 goals that season. Geylang played Home United in the 2001 Singapore Cup final. Home United led 4–0 at half-time as Đurić and playmaker Brian Bothwell came off with injuries. Defender Noh Rahman was withdrawn after injuring his knee ligament. Noor Ali was sent off as 9-men Geylang lost with a final score of 8–0. Despite coach Jang Jung stating in a post-match interview that Đurić would be leaving the club with seven other players, he signed a three-year contract extension and went on to score 97 goals in 126 league games over four seasons. In 2003, he joined an exclusive club of S.League players who had scored 100 domestic goals. (Note: Prior to the 2011 season, milestone goals include both S.League and Singapore Cup goals. The FAS amended it to include only league goals in 2011.)

With the success of the 2002 FIFA World Cup in Japan and South Korea, the AFC revamped their continental competition by introducing the AFC Champions League and the AFC Cup. Geylang as 2001 S.League winners participated in the 2002–03 AFC Champions League qualification. They were drawn against DPMM in the second round of the Eastern qualifying zone; Đurić scored once in the home leg and twice in the away leg as Geylang progressed 7–0 on aggregate. They met Chinese Jia-A League club Shanghai Shenhua in the final qualifying stage, exiting 5–1 on aggregate with Đurić scoring a goal in the second leg.

Geylang entered the inaugural AFC Cup as 2003 S.League runners-up. Đurić scored in both legs of the quarter-finals as Geylang United knocked Perak out of the competition. He scored a total of five goals in the competition as Geylang made the semi-finals, missing out on the finals with a 1–0 defeat to Al-Wahda in the second leg after a 1–1 draw in the away leg.

=== Singapore Armed Forces ===
Đurić signed for Singapore Armed Forces in November 2004. The Warriors won the league four times, achieving the S.League and Singapore Cup double in 2007 and 2008 as he finished league top-scorer three times in 2007, 2008 and 2009. Đurić scored 129 goals in 150 league appearances with the club. His prolific form was recognised with the S.League Player of the Year award in 2007 and 2008. He scored his 200th domestic goal with a 5-minute hat-trick over Liaoning Guangyuan on 9 July 2007. and broke Mirko Grabovac's league record of 244 goals in local competitions with two goals in a 2–2 draw with ex-club Geylang United on his 38th birthday. The club also defeated Home United 5–4 on penalties after a 1–1 draw in regulation time in the 2008 Charity Shield.

In 2009, Singapore Armed Forces became the first Singapore club to advance to the AFC Champions League after defeating PEA and PSMS Medan in the play-offs. They were drawn against Kashima Antlers, Suwon Samsung Bluewings and Shanghai Shenghua for the group stage. Đurić scored a goal in the match against Suwon Bluewings on 19 May 2009. The club failed to make it to the next round, ending bottom of the group with five losses and a draw.

In September 2009, Đuric agreed to join Sriwijaya of the Indonesian Super League for a reported US$110,000 a season contract. However, a month later, he told the press that he declined the offer in the end because Sriwijaya tried to change the terms of the contract which was mutually agreed upon.

=== Tampines Rovers ===
Đuric's relationship with Singapore Armed Forces had been damaged with his attempted transfer to Sriwijaya. Following their decision not to offer him a new contract, he signed for Tampines Rovers in 2010. He scored 20 league goals in his first season there as the club finished in second place. He clinched three consecutive S.League titles with Tampines Rovers from 2011 to 2013, and four Charity Shield honours from 2011 to 2014. He became the first player to reach a milestone 300th goal on 27 September 2010 with two goals against Balestier Khalsa in the Singapore Cup. With 328 goals in 444 top division club appearances, Đuric was ranked by IFFHS as the world top scorer in July 2011. He picked up his third Player of the Year award in 2012 and finished joint league top-scorer with Moon Soon-Ho in 2013.

Đurić announced his decision to quit professional football at the end of the 2014 season, having been convinced by the club management to postpone his initial plans to retire at the end of 2012. He started the season having scored a record 378 domestic goals. Tampines failed to reach the 2014 AFC Champions League after losing to South China at the first qualifying round. The club dropped into the 2014 AFC Cup accordingly, and was eventually eliminated in the group stage. He ended the season with eight goals in 35 appearances across all competitions as Tampines finished third in the league. Đurić retired from his playing career after his final match in a 2–1 loss to Brunei DPMM in the Singapore Cup third-place play-off match on 5 November 2014.

=== Amateur football ===
Đurić returns to competitive football in 2017 where he joined Singapore Cricket Club and took part in the Cosmopolitan Football league, known as CosmoLeague, which is a top amateur football league in Singapore.

== International career ==
It took Đurić three personal attempts before he received Singaporean citizenship on 27 September 2007 as he was not on the Football Association of Singapore's Foreign Sports Talent Scheme. Despite obtaining his Singapore passport for non-footballing reasons, coach Radojko Avramović called him up to the Singapore national team on 1 November 2007. He made his international debut at the age of 37 years and 89 days against Tajikistan in the first leg of the second round of the 2010 World Cup qualifiers on 9 November, contributing with an immediate impact by scoring both goals in a 2–0 victory. Đurić started the match following injuries to attacking midfielder Shi Jiayi and striker Indra Shahdan Daud. The result coupled with a 1–1 draw in the second leg meant that Singapore progressed to the third round of the Asian Qualifying Tournament for the first time, where they were drawn against Saudi Arabia, Lebanon and Uzbekistan. He continued his fine form on the international stage, scoring against Lebanon and Uzbekistan as Singapore finished third in Group 4.

With the absence of regular captain Indra Sahdan and vice-captain Lionel Lewis for the friendly against Bahrain on 28 May 2008, Đurić skippered Singapore for the first time, becoming the first ever foreign-born player to start a game as captain.

Đurić made the national team for the 2008 AFF Championship but was ruled out for the rest of the tournament after suffering a fibula injury in the opening match against Cambodia. Singapore lost to Vietnam in the semi-finals.

He was called up to the Singapore squad for the 2010 AFF Championship. Singapore was held to a 1–1 draw with the Philippines in the opening match, with Đurić scoring a goal. He scored the equaliser as Singapore came back from a goal down to defeat Myanmar 2–1 in the next match. This was followed by a 1–0 loss to co-host Vietnam. Singapore exited the tournament at the group stage.

Đurić began the 2012 tournament as second-choice forward but following an injury to midfielder Hariss Harun, he was recalled into the first eleven on the left flank. He scored the third goal in a 3–0 win over defending champions Malaysia in the first match. With his goal against Malaysia, he became the oldest goalscorer in the history of the competition. Singapore lost 1–0 to Indonesia three days later but defeated Laos 4–3 in the final group stage match to advance to the next round on goal difference. They defeated Philippines 1–0 on aggregate over two legs in the semi-finals to advance to the finals. Singapore went on to defeat Thailand in the finals to become champions. Đurić retired from international football with a record of 24 goals in 53 international appearances after the tournament.

== Coaching career ==
Đurić stated his intention to remain involved in Singapore football in a coaching capacity as he nears completing his 'A' coaching licence by the end of his playing career. He has been Tampines Rovers' fitness coach since 2013, a job he has held full-time as he prepares to shift to backroom staff.

== Personal life ==
Đurić, an ethnic Serb, was born in the village of Lipac near Doboj. Đurić's father worked for the railways while also playing semi-professional football. His mother was killed during an artillery attack on 9 August 1993, three days before his birthday. His father died of cancer at the age of 62 in 2000. Đurić has an older brother named Milan.

Đurić met his wife Natasha in Melbourne in 1998. They married in January 2000. Their two children – daughter (born 2002) and son (born 2004) – were both born in Singapore.

Đurić lives in Holland Village, Singapore. As part of his rigorous fitness regime, he runs 15 km around his neighbourhood every morning. He does not drink, smoke or do late nights. He avoids chilli and limits his intake of greasy food like prata and chicken rice, and keeps up with his fitness regime in the off-season.

Outside of football, Đurić has been involved in charity work. He has volunteered at a children's home for a decade. He adopted a son from the children's home when he was seven days old.

In 2011, he ran the half-marathon race at the Standard Chartered Marathon alongside radio deejay Rod Monteiro and kinesiologist Dr Tan Swee Kheng to help raise S$12,000 for Sanctuary House, which provides foster care for children. In 2012, Đurić drove a taxi for 12 days to raise $2,657 for The Straits Times School Pocket Money Fund. He and his three kids also painted plastic doves that were sold in aid of the Dover Park Hospice in September 2013. He believes it is part of his "obligation to give something back to Singapore". In December 2014, Đurić was appointed as the first ambassador for the Delta League, a football competition jointly organised by the National Crime Prevention Council and the Singapore Police Force to engage youth who are at risk of falling into delinquency.

== Career statistics ==
=== Club ===
Appearances and goals by club, season and competition
Club	Season	League			National cup		League cup		ACL		AFC Cup		Total		Ref.
Club	Season	Division	Apps	Goals	Apps	Goals	Apps	Goals	Apps	Goals	Apps	Goals	Apps	Goals	Ref.
Szeged LC	1992–93	Nemzeti Bajnokság II											0	0	
Szeged LC	1993–94	Nemzeti Bajnokság II											0	0	
Szeged LC	Total		0	0	0	0	0	0	0	0	0	0	0	0	–
South Melbourne	1994–95	NSL	15	4					–				15	4	
Port Melbourne Sharks	1994–95	VPL	10	0					–				10	0	
South Melbourne	1995–96	NSL	5	0					–				5	0	
Port Melbourne Sharks	1995–96	VPL	18	12					–				18	12	
Gippsland Falcons	1996–97	NSL	15	4					–				15	4	
Locomotive Shanshan	1997	Jia B League	16	2					–				16	2	
West Adelaide	1997–98	NSL	8	3					–				8	3	
Heidelberg United	1998–99	VSL1	8	2					–				8	2	
West Adelaide	1998–99	NSL	27	5					–				27	5	
Tanjong Pagar United	1999	S.League	16	11			—		—		—		16	11	
Marconi Stallions	1999–2000	NSL	15	2					–				15	2	
Sydney Olympic	1999–2000	NSL	3	0					–				3	0	
Australia total			156	45	0	0	0	0	0	0	0	0	156	45	–
Home United	2000	S.League	10	6			—				—		10	6	
Geylang United	2001	S.League	33	31			—		—		—		33	31	
Geylang United	2002	S.League	33	26			—				—		33	26	
Geylang United	2003	S.League	33	27			—		—		—		33	27	
Geylang United	2004	S.League	27	13			—		—				27	13	
Geylang United	Total		126	97	0	0	0	0	0	0	0	0	126	97	–
Singapore; Armed Forces	2005	S.League	27	17			—		—		—		27	17	
Singapore; Armed Forces	2006	S.League	28	19			—		—		—		28	19	
Singapore; Armed Forces	2007	S.League	31	37			—		—				31	37	
Singapore; Armed Forces	2008	S.League	32	28	6 (Note: See talk page for references.)	4	0	0	—		8	9	46	41	
Singapore; Armed Forces	2009	S.League	32	28	1	0	5	2	8	1	—		46	31	
Singapore; Armed Forces	Total		150	129	7	4	5	2	8	1	8	9	178	145	–
Tampines Rovers	2010	S.League	33	20	6	4	0	0	—		—		39	24	
Tampines Rovers	2011	S.League	33	26	3	4	0	0	—		7	6	42	36	
Tampines Rovers	2012	S.League	24	12	6	5	4	2	—		6	2	40	21	
Tampines Rovers	2013	S.League	25	15	1	1	3	3	—		6	3	35	22	
Tampines Rovers	2014	S.League	22	5	4	0	2	0	1	0	6	3	35	8	
Tampines Rovers	Total		137	78	20	14	9	5	1	0	25	14	192	111	–
Singapore total			439	321	28	18	14	7	9	1	33	23	523	370	–
Career total			595	366	28	18	14	7	9	1	33	23	679	415	–

- The inaugural Singapore League Cup was held in 2007.
- Singapore Armed Forces withdrew from the 2007 Singapore League Cup due to prior pre-season commitments.
- The inaugural AFC Cup was held in 2004.
- The FAS withdrew their one allocated qualifying spot for the 2011 and 2012 AFC Champions League. Tampines Rovers entered the 2011 and 2012 AFC Cup instead.

References: S.League Singapore Cup Singapore League Cup AFC Champions League AFC Cup General

=== International ===
(Brackets indicate appearances in non-FIFA matches, and do not count towards total)

Appearances and goals by national team and year
National team	Year	Apps	Goals
Singapore	2007	2	2
Singapore	2008	13 (+1)	5
Singapore	2009	7 (+1)	6
Singapore	2010	11	3
Singapore	2011	9 (+2)	6 (+1)
Singapore	2012	12	4
Total		54	26

Scores and results list Singapore's goal tally first, score column indicates score after each Đurić goal.

List of international goals scored by Aleksandar Đurić
No.	Date	Venue	Opponent	Score	Result	Competition	Ref.
1	9 November 2007	Kallang, Singapore	Tajikistan	1–0	2–0	2010 FIFA World Cup qualification	
2	9 November 2007	Kallang, Singapore	Tajikistan	2–0	2–0	2010 FIFA World Cup qualification	
3	24 January 2008	Muscat, Oman	Kuwait	2–0	2–0	Friendly	
4	26 March 2008	Kallang, Singapore	Lebanon	1–0	2–0	2010 FIFA World Cup qualification	
5	2 June 2008	Kallang, Singapore	Uzbekistan	1–1	3–7	2010 FIFA World Cup qualification	
6	29 November 2008	Petaling Jaya, Malaysia	Malaysia	1–0	2–2	Friendly	
7	29 November 2008	Petaling Jaya, Malaysia	Malaysia	2–1	2–2	Friendly	
8	22 October 2009	Ho Chi Minh City, Vietnam	Turkmenistan	1–0	4–2	2009 Ho Chi Minh City Int'l Football Cup	
9	22 October 2009	Ho Chi Minh City, Vietnam	Turkmenistan	2–1	4–2	2009 Ho Chi Minh City Int'l Football Cup	
10	24 October 2009	Ho Chi Minh City, Vietnam	Vietnam	1–1	2–2	2009 Ho Chi Minh City Int'l Football Cup	
11	4 November 2009	Kallang, Singapore	Indonesia	1–0	3–1	Friendly	
12	4 November 2009	Kallang, Singapore	Indonesia	3–1	3–1	Friendly	
13	18 November 2009	Bangkok, Thailand	Thailand	1–0	1–0	2011 AFC Asian Cup qualification	
14	2 November 2010	Hanoi, Vietnam	North Korea	1–0	1–2	VFF Cup	
15	2 December 2010	Hanoi, Vietnam	Philippines	1–0	1–1	2010 AFF Suzuki Cup	
16	5 December 2010	Hanoi, Vietnam	Myanmar	1–1	2–1	2010 AFF Suzuki Cup	
17	7 June 2011	Jalan Besar, Singapore	Maldives	4–0	4–0	Friendly	
18	18 July 2011	Jalan Besar, Singapore	Chinese Taipei	1–0	3–2	Friendly	
19	18 July 2011	Jalan Besar, Singapore	Chinese Taipei	2–1	3–2	Friendly	
20	23 July 2011	Jalan Besar, Singapore	Malaysia	1–1	5–3	2014 FIFA World Cup qualification	
21	23 July 2011	Jalan Besar, Singapore	Malaysia	5–3	5–3	2014 FIFA World Cup qualification	
22	2 September 2011	Kunming, China	China	1–0	1–2	2014 FIFA World Cup qualification	
23	7 October 2011	Jalan Besar, Singapore	Philippines	2–0	2–0	Friendly	
24	15 August 2012	Jalan Besar, Singapore	Hong Kong	1–0	2–0	Friendly	
25	15 August 2012	Jalan Besar, Singapore	Hong Kong	2–0	2–0	Friendly	
26	19 November 2012	Jurong West, Singapore	Pakistan	4–0	4–0	Friendly	
27	25 November 2012	Kuala Lumpur, Malaysia	Malaysia	3–0	3–0	2012 AFF Suzuki Cup	

== Honours ==
Home United

- Singapore Cup: 2000

Geylang United

- S.League: 2001

Singapore Armed Forces

- S.League: 2006, 2007, 2008, 2009
- Singapore Cup: 2007, 2008
- Charity Shield: 2008

Tampines Rovers

- S.League: 2011, 2012, 2013
- Charity Shield: 2011, 2012, 2013, 2014

Singapore

- AFF Championship: 2012

Individual

- S.League People's Choice Award: 2007
- S.League Player of the Year: 2007, 2008, 2012
- S.League Top Scorer: 2007, 2008, 2009, 2013
- IFFHS World's Best Goal Scorer of the Decade (2001–10)
