= Norikazu Murakami =

Japanese footballer

Personal information
- Date of birth: 10 October 1981 (age 45)
- Place of birth: Yokohama, Kanagawa, Japan
- Height: 1.80 m (5 ft 11 in)
- Position: Forward

Youth career
- Yokohama Flugels
- Yokohama F Marinos
- Meiji University

Senior career*
Years	Team	Apps	(Gls)
- YSCC Yokohama
- Predator Urayasu Futsal Club (Futsal)
2004–2005	Albirex Niigata (S)	40	(14)
2006	Balestier Khalsa FC		
2007–2008	Singapore Armed Forces FC		
2009	Home United FC		
2009–2010	Platinum Stars	19	(4)
2010–2011	Golden Arrows	13	(0)
2012–2013	Alemannia Aachen	14	(1)
2014	SV Wilhelmshaven	10	(0)
2015	1. FC Lokomotive Leipzig	16	(0)
2015–2017	Hilal Maroc Bergheim		
- * Club domestic league appearances and goals

Norikazu Murakami (村上 範和, Murakami Norikazu; born 10 October 1981) is a Japanese former professional footballer who played as a forward.

== Career ==
Murakami was born in Yokohama, Kanagawa, Japan. He played for the Yokohama Flugels and Yokohama F Marinos youth teams as well as Meiji University. He also played for regional league side YSCC Yokohama and futsal with Predator Urayasu Futsal Club.

He entered professional football in Singapore's S League when he joined Albirex Niigata (S) mid-way through the 2004 season. He joined Balestier Khalsa FC in 2006 and then Singapore Armed Forces FC in 2007. In 2008, Murakami was the second top scorer for Singapore Armed Forces FC. However, he was released at the end of the season. In March 2009, he signed for Home United FC but left five months later for South African club Platinum Stars. During the 2009–10 season Murakami scored four goals in ten starts. However, in August 2010, Murakami was released by the Platinum Stars.

== Honours ==
Singapore Armed Forces

- S.League: 2007, 2008
- Singapore Cup: 2007, 2008
