= 2012 Thai Premier League =

Thai Premier League
- Season: 2012
- Champions: SCG Muangthong United
- Relegated: Port Authority of Thailand; BBCU; TTM Chiangmai
- Champions League: SCG Muangthong United; Buriram United
- Matches: 306
- Goals: 825 (2.7 per match)
- Top goalscorer: (Brazil) Cleiton Silva (Thailand) Teerasil Dangda (24 goals)
- Biggest home win: BEC Tero Sasana 7–1 TTM Chiangmai
- Biggest away win: BBCU 1–8 SCG Muangthong United
- Highest scoring: Buriram United 7–2 Chainat (11 August 2012); BBCU 1–8 SCG Muangthong United
- Highest attendance: 30,102; Wuachon United vs SCG Muangthong United
- Lowest attendance: 0 Genufood Samut Songkhram vs Army United
- Average attendance: 4,823

The 2012 Thai Premier League (known as Sponsor Thai Premier League for sponsorship reasons) was the 16th season of the Thai Premier League since its establishment in 1996. A total of 18 teams competed in the league.

== Teams ==
Khonkaen, Siam Navy and Sriracha were relegated to the 2012 Thai Division 1 League after finishing the 2011 season in the bottom three places.

2011 Thai Division 1 League champions Buriram, runners-up Chainat and third place BBCU were promoted to the Thai Premier League. Buriram were to merge with Buriram PEA at the end of the 2011 campaign to become Buriram United allowing Wuachon United to take their place in the top flight for the first time.

=== Stadia and locations ===
Locations of the Thai Premier League teams 2012
Football clubs in Bangkok Metropolitan Region

Team	Location	Stadium	Capacity	Ref.
Army United	Phaya Thai, Bangkok	Thai Army Sports Stadium	25,000	
Bangkok Glass	Pathumthani	Leo Stadium	10,000	
BEC Tero Sasana	Pathum Wan, Bangkok	Thephasadin Stadium	6,378	
Buriram United	Buriram	New I-Mobile Stadium	24,000	
BBCU	Bang Kapi, Bangkok	Rajamangala Stadium	65,000	
Chainat	Chainat	Khao Plong Stadium	5,574	
Chiangrai United	Chiangrai	Mae Fah Luang University Stadium United Stadium of Chiangrai	3,346 12,000	
Chonburi	Chonburi	Chonburi Stadium	8,600	
Esan United	Ubon Ratchathani	Tung Burapha Stadium	7,500	
SCG Muangthong United	Nonthaburi	SCG Stadium	17,000	
Osotspa M-150 Saraburi	Saraburi	Saraburi Stadium	5,000	
Pattaya United	Chonburi	Nongprue Municipality Football Field	8,000	
INSEE Police United	Pathumthani	Thammasat Stadium	25,000	
Samut Songkhram	Samut Songkhram	Samut Songkhram Province Stadium	6,000	
Thai Port	Khlong Toei, Bangkok	PAT Stadium	12,308	
TOT	Lak Si, Bangkok	TOT Stadium Chaeng Watthana	5,000	
TTM Chiangmai	Chiang Mai	700th Anniversary Stadium	25,000	
Wuachon United	Songkhla	Tinasulanon Stadium	35,000	

=== Name changes ===
- Thai Port were renamed to Port FC for the start of the season and then renamed back to Thai Port one week later.
- Buriram PEA and Buriram merged to become Buriram United
- Sisaket were renamed to Esan United for the start of the season.
- TTM Phichit were renamed to TTM Chiangmai for the start of the season.
- Buriram were renamed to Wuachon United for the start of the season.

=== Stadium Changes ===
- Muangthong United's stadium would be known as SCG Stadium due to sponsorship reasons. The stadium was previously known as the Yamaha Stadium, again because of sponsorship reasons. The stadium was originally known as the Thunderdome Stadium.
- BBCU moved in the Rajamangala Stadium, vacating the Thai Army Sports Stadium that was shared with Army United. However BBCU did use Muangthong United's SCG Stadium for the match with Chiangrai United due to the Rajamangala Stadium being unavailable
- TTM Chiangmai moved from the Phichit Stadium to the 700th Anniversary Stadium .
- Esan United moved into the Tung Burapha Stadium after relocating into Ubon Ratchathani province.
- Wuachon United moved from the I-Mobile Stadium to the Tinasulanon Stadium .
- Police United used the IPE Stadium in Chonburi until the Thammasat Stadium was ready following floods that also made them use alternative stadiums in the 2011 campaign. A few games were also stage at the Army Stadium in Bangkok.
- BEC Tero Sasana hosted Osotspa at the Rajamangala Stadium due to the Thephasadin Stadium being unavailable.

== Personnel and sponsoring ==
Team	Sponsor	Kit maker	Team captain	Head coach
Army United	Chang	Pan	(Thailand) Tatree Sing-Ha	(Thailand) Paniphon Kerdyam
Bangkok Glass	Leo Beer	Umbro	(Thailand) Amnart Kaewkiew	(England) Phil Stubbins
BEC Tero Sasana	Channel 3	FBT	(Thailand) Rangsan Viwatchaichok	(Sweden) Sven-Göran Eriksson
Buriram United	Chang	-	(Thailand) Apichet Puttan	(Thailand) Attaphol Buspakom
BBCU	3 Board Band	-	(Thailand) Jakapong Yaito	(Thailand) Adul Rungruang
Chainat	-	Kappa	(Thailand) Narongchai Vachiraban	(Thailand) Surachai Jaturapattarapong
Chiangrai United	Leo Beer	DEFFO	(Thailand) Teerasak Po-on	(Brazil) Stefano Cugurra
Chonburi	Chang	Nike	(Thailand) Pipob On-Mo	(Thailand) Withaya Laohakul
Esan United	Muang Thai Life Assurance	FBT	(Thailand) Wuttichai Tathong	(Thailand) Phayong Khunnaen
Muangthong United	Siam Cement Group (SCG) and Yamaha	Grand Sport	(Thailand) Datsakorn Thonglao	(Serbia) Slaviša Jokanović
Osotspa Saraburi	M-150	Grand Sport	(Thailand) Jetsada Puanakunmee	(Thailand) Pairoj Borwonwatanadilok
Pattaya United	True	Grand Sport	(Thailand) Niweat Siriwong	(Thailand) Chalermwoot Sa-Ngapol
Police United	INSEE Cement	Kela	(Thailand) Surachart Sareepim	(Thailand) Thawatchai Damrong-Ongtrakul
Samut Songkhram	Genufood	Kool Sport	(Thailand) Chaiwut Wattana	(Thailand) Somchai Chuayboonchum
Thai Port	FB Battery	FBT	(Thailand) Itthipol Nonsiri	(Thailand) Worakorn Wichanarong
TOT	TOT	-	(Japan) Takahiro Kawamura	(Thailand) Somchai Subpherm
TTM Chiangmai	Thailand Tobacco Monopoly	Mawin	(Thailand) Watchara Mahawong	(Thailand) Narong Suwannachot
Wuachon United	TPIPL	FBT	(Thailand) Chairat Madsiri	(Thailand) Jadet Meelarp

== Managerial changes ==
Team	Outgoing manager	Manner of departure	Incoming manager
Muangthong United	(England) Robbie Fowler	Neutral termination	(Serbia) Slaviša Jokanović
TTM Chiangmai	(Thailand) Somchai Chuayboonchum	Sacked	(Thailand) Narong Suwan-nachot
Esan United	(Brazil) Royter Moreira	Resigned	(Thailand) Phayong Khunnaen
Thai Port	(Thailand) Thongchai Sukkoki	Resigned	(Thailand) Piyakul Kaewnamkang
Thai Port	(Thailand) Piyakul Kaewnamkang	Resigned	(Thailand) Adul Leukijna
Thai Port	(Thailand) Adul Leukijna	Caretaker role ended	(Thailand) Worakorn Wichanarong
BBCU	(Thailand) Kiatisuk Senamuang	Resigned	(Thailand) Adul Rungruang
Samut Songkhram	(Thailand) Vorawan Chitavanich	Resigned	(Thailand) Somchai Chuayboonchum
BEC Tero Sasana	(Australia) Andrew Ord	Sacked	(Sweden) Sven-Göran Eriksson
Army United	(Thailand) Amnart Chalermchaowarit	Sacked	(Thailand) Paniphon Kerdyam
Bangkok Glass	(Thailand) Surachai Jaturapattarapong	Resigned	(England) Phil Stubbins
Chainat	(Thailand) Issara Sritaro	Resigned	(Thailand) Surachai Jaturapattarapong

=== Foreign players ===
Club	Player 1	Player 2	Player 3	Player 4	Player 5	Player 6	Asian Player	Former Players
Army United	(Argentina) Daniel Blanco	(Brazil) Fabinho	(Brazil) Tony Pinho	(Brazil) Alessandro Alves	(Germany) Björn Lindemann		(Australia) Danny Invincibile	(Argentina) Matías Recio (Brazil) Leandro (Estonia) Kert Kütt
Bangkok Glass	(Brazil) Rafael	(Cameroon) Valery Hiek	(France) Flavien Michelini	(Georgia (country)) Giorgi	(Nigeria) Samuel Ajayi	(Sweden) George Ekeh	(Japan) Hironori Saruta	(Brazil) Elias
BEC Tero Sasana	(Algeria) Kharroubi	(Australia) Jovanovic	(Brazil) Cleiton	(Ghana) Gilbert Koomson	(Spain) Arzu	(Spain) Regino	(Japan) Yusuke Kato	(Cameroon) Maxime Moundou (Japan) Takenori Hayashi (Morocco) Karim Rouani
Buriram United	(France) Goran Jerković	(Ghana) Acheampong	(Japan) Honda	(Montenegro) Đorđije Ćetković	(Montenegro) Marko Ćetković	(Spain) Osmar	(Uzbekistan) Anvar Rajabov	(Brazil) Anderson (Cameroon) Ekwalla Herman (Cameroon) Florent Obama (Cameroon) Frank Ohandza (Cameroon) John Mary (Uzbekistan) Asqar Jadigerov
BBCU	(Brazil) Juninho	(Cameroon) Jean Marc	(Guinea) Moussa Sylla	(Ivory Coast) N'Guatta	(Nigeria) Aikhionbare	(South Korea) Cho Kwang-Hoon	(South Korea) Kim Young-Kwang	(Pakistan) Hassan Bashir
Chainat	(Cameroon) Clarence Bitang	(Cameroon) Moise	(Montenegro) Vukadinović	(Spain) José Galán	(Trinidad and Tobago) Jagdeosingh	(Wales) Michael Byrne	(South Korea) Lee Dong-Won	(Ivory Coast) Kouadio Pascal (Trinidad and Tobago) Yohance Marshall
Chiangrai United	(Argentina) Franco Hita	(Brazil) Antonio Claudio	(Brazil) Leandro Assumpção	(Brazil) Uilian Souza	(Indonesia) Greg Nwokolo	(Indonesia) Victor Igbonefo	(Timor-Leste) Emerson Cesario	(Australia) Adrian Caceres (Brazil) Gilcimar Pereira (Liberia) Murphy Nagbe
Chonburi	(Brazil) Anderson	(Brazil) Thiago Cunha	(France) Doumeng	(Ivory Coast) Diakité	(Togo) Thomas Dossevi	(South Korea) Jeon Kwang-jin	(Japan) Kazuto Kushida	(Cameroon) Ludovick Takam (Ivory Coast) Bireme Diouf
Esan United	(Brazil) Chayene Santos	(Brazil) Victor Amaro	(Cameroon) Ulrich Munze	(Ivory Coast) Kouadio Pascal	(Madagascar) Guy Hubert	(Scotland) Mark Burchill	(South Korea) Kim Tae-young	
Muangthong United	(Bolivia) Edivaldo	(Brazil) Paulo Rangel	(Ivory Coast) Dagno Siaka	(Ivory Coast) Mohamed Koné	(North Macedonia) Mario Gjurovski	(Netherlands) Adnan Barakat	(North Korea) Ri Kwang-chon	(Ivory Coast) Christian Kouakou
Osotspa Saraburi	(Brazil) Dudu	(Cameroon) Theodore Yuyun	(Ivory Coast) Anthony Moura	(Namibia) Lazarus Kaimbi	(Namibia) Tangeni Shipahu	(Japan) Katano	(Japan) Yamamoto	(Brazil) Tufy Pina (Rwanda) Jimmy Mulisa (South Africa) Sandile Zuke
Pattaya United	(Cameroon) Ludovick Takam	(Cameroon) Paul Ekollo	(Nigeria) O. J. Obatola	(Russia) Rod Dyachenko	(Slovakia) Marián Juhás	(South Korea) Kim Do-Yeon	(Japan) Keisuke Ogawa	(Ivory Coast) Athanase (Japan) Ryuki Kozawa
Police United	(Brazil) Leandro	(Brazil) Daniel Côrtes	(Brazil) Daniel Melo	(Cameroon) Yannick Ossok	(Nigeria) Amara Jerry	(South Korea) Park Jae-hong	(South Korea) Lee Han-guk	(Netherlands) Samir El Gaaouiri
Samut Songkhram	(Argentina) Lucas Daniel	(Cameroon) David Bayiha	(Cameroon) Njie Divine	(France) Christian Nade	(Ivory Coast) Bireme Diouf	(Portugal) Zezinando	(South Korea) Park Jae-hyun	(Cambodia) Keo Sokngon
Thai Port	(Brazil) Mário Da Silva	(Brazil) Alex da Costa	(Scotland) Steven Robb	(Sweden) Olof Watson	(South Korea) Whoo Hyun	(South Korea) Kim Ba-We	(North Korea) Ri Myong-jun	(Cameroon) Valci Júnior (Cameroon) Ulrich Munze
TOT	(Brazil) Amaury Nunes	(Brazil) Diego Walsh	(England) Bas Savage	(France) Younes Chaib	(Serbia) Paunović	(Japan) Kawamura	(South Korea) Lee Jun-ki	
TTM Chiangmai	(Brazil) Leonardo Ferreira da Silva	(Ivory Coast) Kouadio Pascal	(Slovakia) Jan Hrbek	(South Korea) Jung Ho-jin	(South Korea) Kim Joo-Yong	(South Korea) Won Yoo-hyun	(South Korea) Yeon Gi-sung	(Georgia (country)) Giorgi Tsimakuridze (South Korea) Lee Gwang-jae
Wuachon United	(Brazil) Aron da Silva	(Cameroon) Elvis Job	(Cameroon) Jules Baga	(Ghana) Kwadwo Boabah	(Ivory Coast) Koné Seydou	(Serbia) Rakočević	(Japan) Daiki Higuchi	(Brazil) Ney Fabiano (Cameroon) Clarence Bitang

== League table ==
Pos	Team	Pld	W	D	L	GF	GA	GD	Pts	Qualification or relegation
1	Muangthong United (C)	34	25	9	0	78	31	+47	84	2013 AFC Champions League Group stage
2	Chonburi	34	21	7	6	65	33	+32	70	
3	BEC Tero Sasana	34	16	9	9	53	43	+10	57	
4	Buriram United	34	14	12	8	60	40	+20	54	2013 AFC Champions League Qualifying play-off (Note: Buriram United qualified for the 2013 AFC Champions League as winners of the 2012 Thai FA Cup.)
5	Osotspa Saraburi	34	16	4	14	55	48	+7	52	
6	Esan United	34	11	14	9	41	42	−1	47	
7	Samut Songkhram	34	12	10	12	37	39	−2	46	
8	Bangkok Glass	34	10	15	9	53	39	+14	45	
9	Chiangrai United	34	11	11	12	40	47	−7	44	
10	Army United	34	10	13	11	34	38	−4	43	
11	Police United	34	10	12	12	37	38	−1	42	
12	TOT	34	10	12	12	43	46	−3	42	
13	Wuachon United	34	9	14	11	46	54	−8	41	
14	Chainat	34	9	12	13	59	72	−13	39	
15	Pattaya United	34	9	10	15	35	47	−12	37	
16	Thai Port (R)	34	8	9	17	32	48	−16	33	Relegation to the 2013 Thai Division 1 League
17	BBCU (R)	34	4	13	17	32	63	−31	25	Relegation to the 2013 Thai Division 1 League
18	TTM Chiangmai (R)	34	2	12	20	25	57	−32	18	Relegation to the 2013 Thai Division 1 League

Updated to match(es) played on 28 October 2012. Source: Thai Premier League
Rules for classification: 1st points; 2nd head-to-head (only match result, not used aggregate); 3rd match win; 4th goal difference; 5th goals scored.
(C) Champions; (R) Relegated

== Results ==
Home \ Away	ARM	BKG	BEC	BRU	BBC	CHA	CRU	CHO	ESU	MTU	OSO	PAT	POL	SAS	THP	TOT	TTM	WUA
Army United		0–0	1–3	3–3	1–1	1–1	1–0	1–0	1–0	1–2	1–3	2–0	1–1	1–0	1–0	2–1	2–2	1–3
Bangkok Glass	0–0		1–1	1–2	5–2	5–3	4–1	0–0	0–0	1–2	1–0	1–1	2–0	4–1	4–0	0–0	2–2	2–0
BEC Tero Sasana	0–0	3–0		0–0	1–1	4–2	3–2	1–2	0–1	2–2	0–4	3–1	2–2	1–0	0–2	2–1	7–1	2–1
Buriram United	1–1	3–2	0–1		3–0	7–2	3–1	3–4	2–2	1–1	4–2	1–1	2–2	0–0	1–0	2–1	1–0	0–0
BBCU	1–1	0–0	2–2	1–4		0–1	1–2	0–0	1–0	1–8	0–0	0–2	1–1	2–2	1–3	3–2	1–1	1–1
Chainat	1–0	2–2	2–1	0–3	1–3		1–2	0–3	1–1	4–4	2–2	4–2	1–3	1–1	2–0	2–2	0–1	1–1
Chiangrai United	0–1	1–0	0–1	2–1	2–0	1–1		0–0	2–1	1–1	4–3	2–1	1–0	1–0	1–1	0–1	3–2	1–1
Chonburi	3–1	1–1	3–0	4–2	4–1	4–3	2–1		5–1	2–2	3–1	2–1	1–0	1–2	4–0	2–0	0–0	1–0
Esan United	1–1	1–0	4–0	1–1	1–0	3–3	3–3	2–1		1–1	2–1	0–1	1–1	2–1	2–1	1–1	2–1	1–2
Muangthong United	2–1	2–2	2–1	1–1	2–0	1–0	2–0	2–0	3–0		2–1	3–2	3–1	1–0	5–1	2–1	3–0	2–0
Osotspa Saraburi	1–0	1–3	2–3	2–1	1–0	2–1	4–1	3–1	2–1	1–2		4–2	2–0	0–1	1–0	2–1	4–3	1–2
Pattaya United	2–1	0–0	1–0	1–0	2–0	0–2	2–2	0–2	2–2	0–1	0–0		1–1	0–0	1–0	1–3	2–2	1–0
Police United	0–1	3–1	0–2	0–0	1–1	4–2	1–1	1–2	0–1	1–2	1–0	1–0		1–1	1–0	1–1	0–0	2–0
Samut Songkhram	1–0	3–2	1–1	0–3	1–0	2–3	0–0	1–0	0–0	1–2	1–0	2–0	1–0		1–2	4–0	0–0	4–4
Thai Port	1–1	0–0	0–2	2–1	3–2	2–2	2–0	1–2	0–1	1–2	0–0	2–4	0–1	1–2		0–0	1–0	0–0
TOT	0–2	3–2	1–1	0–1	3–2	1–1	1–0	1–1	3–1	1–1	1–3	3–1	1–2	3–0	1–1		1–0	3–3
TTM Chiangmai	2–2	0–0	0–1	0–2	0–1	2–3	0–0	0–1	0–0	0–3	1–2	1–0	0–2	0–1	2–5	0–1		2–2
Wuachon United	2–0	1–5	1–2	2–1	2–2	2–4	2–2	1–4	1–1	1–4	3–0	0–0	3–2	3–2	0–0	0–0	2–0	

Updated to match(es) played on 28 October 2012. Source: Thai Premier League
Legend: Blue = home team win; Yellow = draw; Red = away team win.

== Season statistics ==
=== Top scorers ===
Rank	Player	Club	Goals
1	(Brazil) Cleiton Silva	BEC Tero Sasana	24
1	(Thailand) Teerasil Dangda	Muangthong United	24
3	(Thailand) Tana Chanabut	Police United	15
4	(North Macedonia) Mario Ǵurovski	Muangthong United	14
4	(Thailand) Pipob On-Mo	Chonburi	14
6	(Thailand) Phuwadol Suwannachart	Chainat	13
7	(Ghana) Frank Acheampong	Buriram United	12
7	(Cameroon) Ludovick Takam	Pattaya United	12
9	(Nigeria) Samuel Ajayi	Bangkok Glass	11
9	(Ivory Coast) Bireme Diouf	Samut Songkhram	11

=== Hat-tricks ===
Player	Nationality	For	Against	Result^{[a]}	Date
Thomas Dossevi	Togo	Chonburi	Esan United	5-1	7 April 2012
Dudu	Brazil	Osotspa Saraburi	Army United	3-1	8 April 2012
Cleiton Silva	Brazil	BEC Tero Sasana	Bangkok Glass	3-0	12 May 2012
Choklap Nilsang	Thailand	Chiangrai United	Osotspa Saraburi	4-3	26 May 2012
Pipob On-Mo	Thailand	Chonburi	Buriram United	4-3	24 June 2012
Ekkachai Sumrei	Thailand	Buriram United	Chainat	7-2	11 August 2012
Cleiton Silva	Brazil	BEC Tero Sasana	Chainat	4-2	8 September 2012
Amorn Thammanarm	Thailand	BEC Tero Sasana	TTM Chiangmai	7-1	10 October 2012
Teerasil Dangda^{4}	Thailand	Muangthong United	BBCU	8-1	17 October 2012
Kendall Jagdeosingh	Trinidad and Tobago	Chainat	Wuachon United	4-2	21 October 2012

- ^{4} Player scored 4 goals

== Attendance ==
Pos	Team	Total	High	Low	Average	Change
1	Buriram United	260,415	23,033	9,763	15,319	+2.1%
2	Muangthong United	228,256	21,155	8,811	13,427	+25.0%
3	Chiangrai United	136,578	13,773	2,405	8,034	+115.3%
4	Bangkok Glass	121,003	10,754	4,517	7,118	+24.7%
5	Wuachon United	115,980	30,102	2,617	6,822	−9.5%
6	Chonburi	101,036	8,565	3,975	5,943	+9.4%
7	BEC Tero Sasana	61,929	6,124	1,053	3,643	+31.0%
8	Esan United	58,843	6,871	1,748	3,461	−52.1%
9	Police United	58,774	10,890	1,023	3,457	−4.9%
10	Chainat	57,089	6,680	1,376	3,358	−7.3%
11	Army United	55,512	5,927	1,712	3,265	−41.5%
12	Osotspa Saraburi	47,483	4,943	1,450	2,793	−23.6%
13	Thai Port	38,424	2,991	500	2,260	−18.2%
14	Pattaya United	35,667	4,500	1,226	2,098	+15.7%
15	Samut Songkhram	32,490	3,632	0	1,911	−33.5%
16	TTM Chiangmai	25,772	5,854	293	1,516	−32.3%
17	TOT	24,551	3,606	549	1,444	+5.2%
18	BBCU	15,967	2,673	235	939	+17.5%
	League total	1,475,769	30,102	0	4,823	+5.7%

Updated to games played on Oct 15, 2012
Source: Thai Premier League

== Awards ==
=== Annual awards ===
==== Player of the Year ====
The Player of the Year was awarded to Teerasil Dangda.

==== Youth Player of the Year ====
The Youth Player of the Year was awarded to Chanathip Songkrasin.

==== Coach of the Year ====
The Coach of the Year was awarded to Slaviša Jokanović.

== See also ==
- 2012 Thai Division 1 League
- 2012 Regional League Division 2
- 2012 Thai FA Cup
- 2012 Kor Royal Cup
