= 2011 Thai Premier League =

Thai Premier League
- Season: 2011
- Champions: Buriram PEA
- Relegated: Siam Navy; Sriracha; Khon Kaen
- 2012 AFC Champions League: Buriram PEA (group stage); Chonburi (qualifying play-off)
- Matches: 306
- Goals: 734 (2.4 per match)
- Top goalscorer: (Cameroon) Frank Ohandza (19 goals)
- Biggest home win: Chonburi 6–0 TOT
- Biggest away win: Samut Songkhram 0–4 Buriram PEA
- Highest scoring: Bangkok Glass 5–3 Insee Police United; Muangthong United 6–2 Bangkok Glass (8 goals)
- Longest unbeaten run: Buriram PEA (15 games) ended 4 June 2011
- Highest attendance: 24,712; Buriram PEA vs Chonburi, March 20, 2011
- Lowest attendance: 183; Chonburi vs Insee Police United, October 15, 2011
- Average attendance: 4,564

2011 Thai Premier League (known as Sponsor Thai Premier League for sponsorship reasons) was the 15th season of the Thai Premier League since its establishment in 1996. A total of 18 teams are competing in the league due to a two team expansion, with Muangthong United as the defending champions.

The season started on 12 February 2011 and is generally broken down into 2 legs. The first leg being played from February to early June with the second leg taking place from late July to November.

During the league break, the opening rounds of the FA Cup and League Cup take place.

== Teams ==
Bangkok United were relegated to the 2011 Thai Division 1 League after finishing the 2010 season in the bottom three places and lost in promotion/relegation play-off.

2010 Thai Division 1 League champions Sriracha, runners-up Khonkaen and third place Chiangrai United were promoted to the Thai Premier League.

=== Stadia and locations ===
Locations of the Thai Premier League 2011 teams
Football clubs in Bangkok Metropolitan Region

Team	Location	Stadium	Capacity	Ref.
Army United	Phaya Thai, Bangkok	Thai Army Sports Stadium	20,000	
Bangkok Glass	Pathumthani	Leo Stadium	8,000	
BEC Tero Sasana	Pathum Wan, Bangkok	Thephasadin Stadium	6,378	
Buriram United	Buriram	I-mobile Stadium (1st leg) New I-Mobile Stadium (2nd leg)	14,000; 24,000	
Chiangrai United	Chiangrai	Mae Fah Luang University Stadium	3,346	
Chonburi	Chonburi	Chonburi Stadium	8,200	
Khonkaen	Khonkaen	Khon Kaen Stadium	3,500	
Muangthong United	Nonthaburi	Yamaha Stadium	25,000	
Osotspa M-150 Saraburi	Saraburi	Saraburi Stadium	5,000	
Pattaya United	Chonburi	IPE Chonburi Stadium (1)	11,000	
Police United	Pathumthani	Thammasat Stadium	25,000	
SCG Samut Songkhram	Samut Songkhram	Samut Songkhram Province Stadium	5,000	
Siam Navy	Chonburi	IPE Chonburi Stadium(1st leg) Sattahip Navy Stadium(2nd leg)	11,000; 5,000	
Sisaket Muangthai	Sisaket	Sri Nakhon Lamduan Stadium	9,000	
Sriracha	Chonburi	Sriracha Suzuki Stadium	5,207	
Thai Port	Bangkok	PAT Stadium	10,308	
TOT S.C.	Nonthaburi Phaya Thai, Bangkok; Lak Si, Bangkok	Yamaha Stadium (5 game) Thai Army Sports Stadium (1 game); TOT Stadium Chaeng Watthana (2nd leg)	17,000; 20,000; 5,000	
TTM Phichit	Phichit	Phichit Provincial Stadium	13,000	

=== Name changes ===
- TOT-CAT were renamed TOT S.C. after an ownership dispute.
- Rajnavy Rayong were renamed Siam Navy after an ownership dispute.

=== Stadium changes ===
- Both Pattaya United and Siam Navy moved into the IPE Stadium in Chonburi. Pattaya's previous ground Nongprue Municipality Football Field is under renovation and Siam Navy left the Rayong Stadium as they withdrew from the province during their ownership dispute. Both teams use the same stadium even though this is actually against the league regulations. Siam Navy were to move back to Rayong and use the Sattahip Navy Stadium for the 2nd leg of the season.
- TOT continued to use Muangthong United's Yamaha Stadium for the opening half of the season before their return to the TOT Stadium Chaeng Watthana for the 2nd leg. TOT also used the Thai Army Sports Stadium for one game in the first leg of the season.
- Chonburi moved to the ODB Chonburi Stadium whilst a new ground is built in Bang San.
- Sriracha's Princess Sirindhorn Stadium will be known as the Suzuki Stadium due to sponsorship reasons.
- BEC Tero Sasana presumably have made the Thephasadin Stadium as their new home, using it for the second season running after their previous home Nong Chok Stadium was apparently being renovated. The move has also brought a bigger fan base to the club.
- Chonburi used one of their former grounds, the IPE Stadium for two games after being suspended from using their home ground due to fan violence. Chonburi fans were also subjected to be banned from the stadium.
- Bangkok Glass used the Thephasadin Stadium and the Yamaha Stadium for their home matches with Samut Songkhram and Pattaya United due to the Leo Stadium being unavailable during the 2011 Thai Flood's.
- Police United used the Suphanburi Municipality Stadium and the Khao Plong Stadium in Chainat for their home matches with Pattaya United, Bangkok Glass, Khon Kaen (all Suphanburi Municipality Stadium) and Muangthong United (Khao Plong Stadium) due to the Thammasat Stadium being unavailable during the 2011 Thai Flood's.

=== Personnel and sponsoring ===
Team	Sponsor	Kit maker	Team captain	Head coach
Army United	Chang	Pan	(Thailand) Wanchana Rattana	(Thailand) Adul Rungruang
Bangkok Glass	Leo Beer	Umbro	(Thailand) Amnaj Kaewkiew	(Thailand) Arjhan Srong-ngamsub
BEC Tero Sasana	3K Battery	FBT	(Thailand) Teeratep Winothai	(Thailand) Phayong Khunnaen
Buriram United	Chang		(Thailand) Apichet Puttan	(Thailand) Attaphol Buspakom
Chiangrai United	Leo Beer	Deffo	(Thailand) Sanya Puangchan	(Brazil) Stefano Cugurra 'Teco'
Chonburi	Chang	FBT	(Thailand) Pipob On-Mo	(Thailand) Witthaya Laohakul
Khon Kaen	3K Battery	Kool Sport	(Thailand) Rermrat Ngam-Chareon	(Thailand) Pichet Supomuang
Muangthong United	Yamaha	Grand Sport	(Thailand) Nattaporn Phanrit	(England) Robbie Fowler
Osotspa M-150 Saraburi	M-150	Grand Sport	(Thailand) Jetsada Puanakunmee	(Thailand) Pairoj Borwonwatanadilok
Pattaya United	True	Grand Sport	(Thailand) Niweat Siriwong	(Thailand) Chalermwoot Sa-Ngapol
Police United	Insee Cement	Kela	(Thailand) Krissadee Prakobkong	(Thailand) Thawatchai Damrong-Ongtrakul
Siam Navy	Arcus	Kappa	(Thailand) Jetsada Ngam-muang	(Thailand) Worakorn Wijannarong
Samut Songkhram	SCG	FBT	(Thailand) Panuwat Yimsa-ngar	(Thailand) Vorawan Chitavanich
Sisaket Muangthai	Muang Thai	FBT	(Thailand) Wuttichai Tathong	(Brazil) Royter Moreira
Sriracha	Suzuki	FBT	(Thailand) Sujarit Jantakul	(Thailand) Dusit Chalermsan
Thai Port	FB Battery		(Thailand) Itthipol Nonsiri	(Thailand) Sukkoki
TOT S.C.	TOT	Kela	(Thailand) Patiparn Phetphun	(Thailand) Somchai Subpherm
TTM Phichit		FBT	(Thailand) Jetsada Boonruangrod	(South Korea) Lee Young-Moo

=== Managerial changes ===
Team	Outgoing manager	Manner of departure	Date of vacancy	Table	Incoming manager	Date of appointment	Table
Pattaya United	(Thailand) Thawatchai Damrong-Ongtrakul	Signed by Police United	21 November 2010	Pre-season	(Thailand) Jatuporn Pramualban	December 2010	Pre-season
Muangthong United	(Belgium) René Desaeyere	Terminated a Contract	9 January 2011	Pre-season	(Brazil) Carlos Roberto	18 January 2011	Pre-season
Muangthong United	(Brazil) Carlos Roberto	Terminated a Contract	23 February 2011	14th	(Portugal) Henrique Calisto	6 March 2011	16th
Sisaket Muangthai	(England) David Booth	Sacked	22 April 2011	13th	(Brazil) Royter Moreira		
TTM Phichit	(South Korea) Bae Myung-Ho	Sacked	28 April 2011	16th	(South Korea) Lee Young-Moo		
Sriracha	(Thailand) Trongyod Klinsrisook	Terminated a Contract	8 May 2011	18th	(Thailand) Dusit Chalermsan		
BEC Tero Sasana	(England) Peter Butler	Sacked			(Thailand) Phayong Khunnaen		
SCG Samut Songkhram	(Thailand) Pol Chomchuen	Sacked			(Thailand) Vorawan Chitavanich		
Pattaya United	(Thailand) Jatuporn Pramualban	Sacked			(Thailand) Chalermwoot Sa-Ngapol		
Thai Port	(Thailand) Sasom Pobprasert	Resigned to join Buriram			(Thailand) Thongchai Sukkoki		
Muangthong United	(Portugal) Henrique Calisto	Sacked		3rd	(England) Robbie Fowler		3rd

=== Ownership changes ===
Club	New Owner	Previous Owner	Date
Rajnavy Rayong	Royal Thai Navy	Rayong Thai Premier	22 December 2010
TOT S.C.	TOT	TOT-CAT	26 January 2011
Thai Port	Port Authority of Thailand	Thai Port	2 February 2011

=== Foreign players ===
Club	Player 1	Player 2	Player 3	Player 4	Player 5	Player 6	Asian Player	Former Players
Army United	(Brazil) Alessandro Alves	(Brazil) Leandro					(Japan) Jun Kochi	(Cameroon) Emmanuel Madengue
Bangkok Glass	(Brazil) Rafael Novais	(Brazil) Paulinho	(France) Flavien Michelini	(Guinea) Moussa Sylla	(Japan) Hironori Saruta	(Nigeria) Samuel Ajayi	(Japan) Kunihiko Takizawa	(Cameroon) Paul Ekollo (France) Sylvain Idangar (Portugal) Tiago Jorge (Wales) Michael Byrne
BEC-Tero Sasana	(Cameroon) Maxime Moundou	(Croatia) Ivan Brozovic	(Morocco) Karim Rouani	(Nigeria) Bina Ajuwa	(Serbia) Zoran Rajović		(Japan) Nobuyuki Zaizen	(Brazil) Altamir Martins (Nigeria) Ekele Udojoh
Buriram PEA	(Brazil) Douglas	(Cameroon) Clarence Bitang	(Cameroon) Frank Acheampong	(Cameroon) Franck Ohandza	(Cameroon) Herman Ekwalla	(Cameroon) Chijioke Ibekwe		(Brazil) Kanu (Brazil) Wander Luiz
Chiangrai United	(Bolivia) Pato Aguilera	(Brazil) Antônio Cláudio	(Brazil) Edvaldo	(Brazil) Leandro Assumpção	(Brazil) Uilian	(Romania) Leontin Chițescu		(Brazil) Alonso
Chonburi	(Brazil) Ney Fabiano	(France) Anthony Esparza	(Ivory Coast) Jean-Marc Benie	(Japan) Daiki Higuchi	(Serbia) Darko Rakočević	(Serbia) Vladimir Ribić	(Japan) Kazuto Kushida	(Cameroon) Berlin
Khonkaen	(China) Li Xiang	(Laos) Kanlaya Sysomvang	(Scotland) Stuart Kelly				(Laos) Khampheng Sayavutthi	
Muangthong United	(England) Robbie Fowler	(England) Romone Rose	(Ivory Coast) Ali Diarra	(Ivory Coast) Christian Kouakou	(Ivory Coast) Dagno Siaka		(Pakistan) Zesh Rehman	(Antigua and Barbuda) Jorrin John (Finland) Toni Kallio (Ivory Coast) Moussa Sylla (Niger) Issoufou Boubacar
Osotsapa Saraburi	(Algeria) Khaled Kharroubi	(Brazil) Cleiton Silva	(Brazil) Tufy Pina	(Cameroon) Theodore Yuyun	(Namibia) Lazarus Kaimbi		(Japan) Hiromichi Katano	
Pattaya United	(Cameroon) Ludovick Takam	(Cameroon) Paul Ekollo	(Ivory Coast) Kignelman Athanase	(Japan) Kazuya Myodo	(Netherlands) Randy Rustenberg	(Nigeria) O. J. Obatola	(Japan) Keisuke Ogawa	(Brazil) Ricardinho (Japan) Hiroyuki Yamamoto
Police United	(Nigeria) Jerry Amara	(Singapore) John Wilkinson					(South Korea) Hyun Woo	
Siam Navy	(Brazil) Alex Rulla						(China) Hui Ye	(Brazil) Diego Martins
Samut Songkhram	(Brazil) Erikson Noguchipinto	(France) Christian Nadé	(Ivory Coast) Bireme Diouf	(Russia) Rod Dyachenko			(Cambodia) Keo Sokngon	(Nigeria) Echezona Anyichie (Nigeria) Efe Obode
Sisaket Muangthai	(Brazil) Fábio Magrão	(Brazil) Victor Amaro	(Madagascar) Guy Hubert				(Japan) Kazuki Yoshino	(Cambodia) Khim Borey
Sriracha	(Argentina) Lucas Echenique	(Brazil) Cristiano Lopes	(United States) Justin Moose					(Brazil) Aron da Silva
Thai Port	(Brazil) Mário César	(Brazil) Valci Júnior	(Cameroon) Ulrich Munze	(Japan) Yoshiaki Maruyama	(Nigeria) Jacob Aikhionbare	(Scotland) Steven Robb	(South Korea) Kim Dong-chan	
TOT S.C.	(Brazil) Diego Walsh	(France) Younes Chaib	(Ivory Coast) Mohamed Koné	(Switzerland) Oumar Kondé			(Japan) Takahiro Kawamura	
TTM Phichit	(South Korea) Jung Ho-jin	(South Korea) Lee Gwang-jae	(South Korea) Maeng O-jin	(South Korea) Won Yoo-hyun			(South Korea) Yeon Gi-sung	

== League table ==
Pos	Team	Pld	W	D	L	GF	GA	GD	Pts	Qualification or relegation
1	Buriram PEA (C)	34	26	7	1	64	15	+49	85	2012 AFC Champions League group stage Group stage
2	Chonburi	34	20	9	5	58	29	+29	69	2012 AFC Champions League Qualifying play-off (Note: Since Buriram PEA also won the 2011 Thai FA Cup, Chonburi qualified for the 2012 AFC Champions League as the league runners-up.)
3	Muangthong United	34	17	9	8	54	32	+22	60	
4	Pattaya United	34	14	11	9	38	27	+11	53 (Note: PAT 2–1 BKG; BKG 0–0 PAT)	
5	Bangkok Glass	34	15	8	11	55	41	+14	53	
6	Osotspa M-150 Saraburi	34	12	15	7	47	32	+15	51	
7	Thai Port	34	12	9	13	33	38	−5	45 (Note: THP 3–2 BEC; BEC 0–0 THP)	
8	BEC Tero Sasana	34	13	6	15	39	35	+4	45	
9	Police United	34	11	11	12	36	40	−4	44	
10	Chiangrai United	34	11	11	12	47	52	−5	44	
11	TTM Phichit	34	12	7	15	38	54	−16	43	
12	Sisaket Muangthai	34	9	12	13	33	39	−6	39 (Note: ARM 1–1 SIS; SIS 2–1 ARM)	
13	Army United	34	10	9	15	39	40	−1	39	
14	TOT S.C.	34	11	4	19	29	55	−26	37	
15	Samut Songkhram	34	8	12	14	31	45	−14	36	
16	Siam Navy (R)	34	9	6	19	28	51	−23	33	Relegation to the 2012 Thai Division 1 League
17	Sriracha (R)	34	7	11	16	32	43	−11	32	Relegation to the 2012 Thai Division 1 League
18	Khonkaen (R)	34	6	9	19	33	68	−35	27	Relegation to the 2012 Thai Division 1 League

Updated to match(es) played on January 28, 2012. Source: Thai Premier League
Rules for classification: 1st points; 2nd head-to-head (only match result, not used aggregate); 3rd match win; 4th goal difference; 5th goals scored.
(C) Champions; (R) Relegated

== Results ==
Home \ Away	ARM	BKG	BEC	PEA	CRU	CHO	KHO	MTU	OSO	PAT	POL	SNA	SAS	SIS	SRI	THP	TOT	TTM
Army United		1–1	1–0	1–3	2–1	3–4	4–1	3–0	1–1	3–3	0–0	2–0	1–3	1–1	3–1	0–1	1–0	2–0
Bangkok Glass	1–1		2–0	0–2	3–2	2–0	4–0	0–0	2–0	0–0	5–3	4–0	1–2	2–0	3–1	2–1	1–3	4–0
BEC Tero Sasana	1–0	0–2		1–2	3–1	0–1	3–1	2–2	1–3	1–0	0–2	2–0	0–0	0–1	1–0	0–0	2–3	3–0
Buriram PEA	2–1	2–1	1–0		5–0	3–0	2–0	1–0	0–0	0–0	1–1	3–2	3–0	2–1	1–0	1–0	1–0	6–1
Chiangrai United	2–1	2–2	1–3	2–2		4–3	1–1	1–0	2–1	3–1	1–2	3–1	0–0	1–0	1–1	1–1	2–0	2–1
Chonburi	2–1	1–0	2–0	1–1	1–0		6–1	1–1	2–0	2–2	0–0	1–0	2–2	5–0	2–1	2–0	6–0	2–1
Khonkaen	2–0	0–2	0–3	0–2	3–2	0–2		2–2	1–1	1–1	1–2	0–0	1–2	1–1	2–1	1–1	4–2	2–2
Muangthong United	1–1	6–2	1–0	0–0	4–1	1–2	1–0		0–0	2–0	3–1	1–3	2–0	1–0	1–1	2–0	2–0	3–0
Osotspa M-150 Saraburi	1–1	1–0	1–1	0–3	0–0	2–2	3–0	5–1		2–1	2–0	4–1	0–0	2–1	1–2	1–3	4–0	3–0
Pattaya United	1–0	2–1	0–0	0–1	3–0	1–1	3–0	1–0	0–0		0–1	1–2	3–0	1–0	2–0	1–1	2–1	0–1
Police United	0–1	3–1	1–0	2–3	2–1	0–0	1–2	0–2	2–4	0–0		0–1	0–1	2–2	3–1	0–1	1–0	1–0
Siam Navy	1–1	0–1	1–0	0–1	1–3	0–2	2–1	0–3	1–0	1–2	1–1		1–1	2–0	0–1	0–0	2–1	1–1
Samut Songkhram	0–1	1–1	1–1	0–4	1–4	0–1	1–1	1–3	0–0	0–1	1–1	2–0		2–1	1–1	2–0	3–1	2–3
Sisaket Muangthai	2–1	2–0	0–3	1–0	0–0	1–1	2–0	1–2	2–2	2–0	1–1	2–0 (Note: Sisaket were awarded a 2–0 victory over Rajnavy after the latter were found guilty of using an ineligible player. The original result was 1–1.)	2–0		1–1	0–1	2–0	1–2
Sriracha	1–0	2–2	0–1	0–1	0–0	1–2	4–1	0–0	1–1	0–1	0–1	2–0	1–1	1–1		2–1	0–2	1–2
Thai Port	1–0	1–1	3–2	0–1	1–1	1–0	3–0	0–3	0–0	0–2	3–1	3–2	2–1	0–0	1–3		0–1	3–1
TOT S.C.	1–0	2–1	1–3	0–4	1–1	0–1	0–2	1–3	0–0	0–2	1–1	2–1	1–0	0–0	1–0	1–0		2–3
TTM Phichit	1–0	0–1	1–2	0–0	3–1	1–0	2–1	2–1	1–2	1–1	0–0	1–2	1–0	2–2	2–2	2–0	0–1	

Updated to match(es) played on 28 January 2012. Source: Thai Premier League
Legend: Blue = home team win; Yellow = draw; Red = away team win.

== Season statistics ==
=== Top scorers ===
Rank	Player	Club	Goals
1	(Cameroon) Frank Ohandza	Buriram United	19
2	(Brazil) Leandro dos Santos	Army United	18
2	(Thailand) Wasan Natasan	Chiangrai United	18
4	(Thailand) Pipob On-Mo	Chonburi	15
4	(Thailand) Ronnachai Rangsiyo	BEC Tero Sasana	15
4	(Thailand) Sarayuth Chaikamdee	Bangkok Glass	15
7	(Japan) Hironori Saruta	Bangkok Glass	13
7	(Thailand) Teerasil Dangda	Muangthong United	13
9	(South Korea) Kim Joo-Yong	TTM Phichit	11
10	(Brazil) Aron da Silva	Sriracha	10
10	(Brazil) Cleiton Silva	Osotspa M-150 Saraburi	10
10	(Ivory Coast) Kone Mohamed	TOT S.C.	10
10	(Thailand) Suchao Nuchnum	Buriram United	10

=== Hat-tricks ===
Key
^{4}	Player scored four goals
^{5}	Player scored five goals

Player	Nationality	For	Against	Result^{[a]}	Date
Yeon Gi-sung	South Korea	TTM Phichit	Chiangrai United	3–1	13 February 2011
Apipoo Suntornpanavej	Thailand	Osotspa M-150 Saraburi	Royal Thai Navy	4–1	30 April 2011
Ney Fabiano	Brazil	Chonburi	Khonkaen	6–1	14 May 2011
Frank Ohandza	Cameroon	Buriram PEA	SCG Samut Songkhram	4–0	22 May 2011
Sarayuth Chaikamdee	Thailand	Bangkok Glass	Police United	5–3	29 May 2011
Teerasil Dangda	Thailand	Muangthong United	Bangkok Glass	6–2	10 August 2011
Ronnachai Rangsiyo	Thailand	BEC Tero Sasana	TTM Phichit	3–0	27 August 2011
Kritsada Kemdem	Thailand	Osotspa M-150 Saraburi	TOT S.C.	4–0	24 September 2011
Frank Ohandza^{4}	Cameroon	Buriram PEA	TTM Phichit	6-1	20 November 2011
Kim Joo-Yong	South Korea	TTM Phichit	TOT S.C.	3-2	17 December 2011
Chatree Chimtalay	Thailand	Bangkok Glass	Khonkaen	4-0	24 December 2011
Aron da Silva	Brazil	Sriracha	Thai Port	3-1	31 December 2011

== Attendances ==
Pos	Team	Total	High	Low	Average	Change
1	Buriram PEA	255,129	24,712	8,315	15,008	n/a
2	Muangthong United	182,610	21,370	3,278	10,742	n/a
3	Sisaket Muangthai	122,815	12,150	3,105	7,224	n/a
4	Bangkok Glass	97,069	9,891	1,495	5,710	n/a
5	Army United	94,863	15,710	2,529	5,580	n/a
6	Chonburi	92,317	8,500	183	5,430	n/a
7	Chiangrai United	63,447	8,300	600	3,732	n/a^{†}
8	Osotspa M-150 Saraburi	62,171	5,943	1,704	3,657	n/a
9	Police United	61,825	8,949	764	3,637	n/a
10	Khonkaen	52,743	5,425	1,250	3,103	n/a^{†}
11	SCG Samut Songkhram	48,877	5,481	1,200	2,875	n/a
12	BEC Tero Sasana	47,268	5,650	1,425	2,780	n/a
13	Thai Port	46,947	6,916	986	2,762	n/a
14	Siam Navy	39,393	5,933	429	2,317	n/a
15	TTM Phichit	38,039	5,000	1,143	2,238	n/a
16	Sriracha	34,155	3,200	850	2,009	n/a^{†}
17	Pattaya United	29,019	7,500	447	1,814	n/a
18	TOT S.C.	23,324	3,000	386	1,372	n/a
	League total	1,392,011	24,712	183	4,564	n/a

Updated to games played on January 28, 2011
Source: Thai Premier League
Notes:
^{†} Team played previous season in Division 1 League.

== Champions ==
The league champion was Buriram PEA. It was the team's second title.

== See also ==
- 2011 Thai Division 1 League
- 2011 Regional League Division 2
- 2011 Thai FA Cup
- 2011 Kor Royal Cup
