= 2016 Chiangrai United F.C. season =

Chiangrai United
2016 season
- Chairman: Mitti Tiyapairat
- Manager: Teerasak Po-on
- Stadium: United Stadium, Mueang Chiang Rai, Chiang Rai, Thailand
- Thai League: 8th
- Thai FA Cup: Round of 16
- Thai League Cup: Round of 32
- Top goalscorer: League: Wellington Bruno (10); All: Wellington Bruno (14)

The 2016 season is Chiangrai United's 6th season in the Thai Premier League since 2011.

== Players ==
Note: Flags indicate national team as defined under FIFA eligibility rules; some limited exceptions apply. Players may hold more than one non-FIFA nationality.

| No. | Pos. | Nation | Player |
|---|---|---|---|
| 1 | GK | THA | Apirak Woravong |
| 2 | DF | THA | Saranyu Intarach |
| 3 | DF | THA | Krissadee Prakobkong (Third-captain) |
| 4 | DF | THA | Piyaphon Phanichakul |
| 5 | DF | JPN | Kazuki Murakami |
| 6 | MF | THA | Nattapon Woratayanan |
| 7 | MF | THA | Arthit Sunthornpit |
| 8 | MF | JPN | Hironori Saruta |
| 9 | FW | BRA | Dennis Murillo |
| 10 | MF | BRA | Wellington Bruno |
| 11 | MF | THA | Rungrath Poomchantuek |
| 13 | FW | THA | Nantawat Tansopa |
| 15 | GK | THA | Intharat Apinyakool |
| 16 | MF | THA | Wanchalerm Yingyong |
| 17 | FW | THA | Anon Sangsanoi |
| 18 | MF | THA | Yuttajak Kornchan (Vice-captain) |

| No. | Pos. | Nation | Player |
|---|---|---|---|
| 19 | GK | THA | Thanongsak Panpipat |
| 20 | DF | THA | Pratum Chuthong |
| 21 | FW | AUS | Mark Bridge |
| 22 | MF | THA | Pichitphong Choeichiu (Captain) |
| 23 | MF | THA | Bordin Phala |
| 24 | DF | THA | Worawut Namvech |
| 25 | MF | THA | Saharat Kaewsangsai |
| 28 | FW | THA | Ekkachai Rittipan |
| 29 | DF | THA | Kiatprawut Saiwaeo |
| 30 | MF | BRA | Alex Henrique |
| 33 | MF | THA | Chotipat Poomkeaw |
| 34 | DF | THA | Nattapong Promsen |
| 35 | MF | THA | Saharat Sienarsa |
| 36 | MF | THA | Mongkol Tossakrai (on loan from Army United) |
| 37 | MF | THA | Ekanit Panya |
| 38 | MF | THA | Thitipan Puangchan |

== Foreign Players ==
Note: Flags indicate national team as defined under FIFA eligibility rules; some limited exceptions apply. Players may hold more than one non-FIFA nationality.

| No. | Pos. | Nation | Player |
|---|---|---|---|
| 5 | DF | JPN | Kazuki Murakami |
| 8 | MF | JPN | Hironori Saruta |
| 9 | FW | BRA | Dennis Murillo |
| 10 | MF | BRA | Wellington Bruno |
| 14 | FW | BRA | Danilo Cirino de Oliveira |
| 30 | MF | BRA | Alex Henrique |

== Thai League ==
| Pos | Team | Pld | W | D | L | GF | GA | GD | Pts | Qualification or relegation |
|---|---|---|---|---|---|---|---|---|---|---|
| 6 | Ratchaburi Mitr Phol | 30 | 14 | 7 | 9 | 52 | 35 | +17 | 49 | |
| 7 | Sukhothai (Q) | 31 | 13 | 6 | 12 | 50 | 44 | +6 | 45 | 2017 AFC Champions League preliminary round 2 (Note: Qualified as drawn winners of the 2016 Thai FA Cup.) |
| 8 | Chiangrai United | 31 | 13 | 6 | 12 | 42 | 43 | −1 | 45 | |
| 9 | BEC Tero Sasana | 30 | 12 | 5 | 13 | 42 | 52 | −10 | 41 | |
| 10 | Suphanburi | 31 | 10 | 8 | 13 | 33 | 35 | −2 | 38 | |

Updated to match(es) played on 25 September 2016. Source: Thai League
Rules for classification: 1) points; 2) goal difference; 3) number of goals scored.
(Q) Qualified for the phase indicated
Notes:

| Date | Opponents | H / A | Result F–A | Scorers | League position |
|---|---|---|---|---|---|
| 5 March 2016 | Suphanburi | H | 1–0 | Dennis 20' | 7th |
| 9 March 2016 | Sukhothai | A | 0–0 | | 5th |
| 12 March 2016 | Buriram United | H | 0–0 | | 6th |
| 16 March 2016 | Pattaya United | A | 3–3 | Bruno 7', Danilo (2) 64', 73' (pen.) | 7th |
| 30 March 2016 | BBCU | A | 4–3 | Rungrath 12', Bruno 36', Piyaphon 50', Saruta 61' | 7th |
| 3 April 2016 | Chainat Hornbill | H | 1–0 | Dennis 89' | 6th |
| 23 April 2016 | Osotspa M-150 Samut Prakan | A | 2–1 | Piyaphon 35', Arthit 83' | 6th |
| 27 April 2016 | Bangkok Glass | H | 1–3 | Danilo 1' | 6th |
| 1 May 2016 | Army United | A | 0–1 | | 8th |
| 7 May 2016 | SCG Muangthong United | H | 0–3 | | 9th |
| 11 May 2016 | Nakhon Ratchasima Mazda | A | 4–1 | Dennis (3) 2', 45+1', 59', Danilo 26' | 8th |
| 15 May 2016 | Ratchaburi Mitr Phol | H | 1–0 | Anon 45' | 6th |
| 21 May 2016 | BEC Tero Sasana | A | 2–1 | Bruno 37', Piyaphon 68' | 6th |
| 28 May 2016 | Navy | H | 2–1 | Pichitphong 9', Bruno 17' | 5th |
| 12 June 2016 | Bangkok United | A | 0–2 | | 5th |
| 18 June 2016 | Sisaket | H | 3–1 | Bruno (2) 76', 88', Arthit 81' | 4th |
| 22 June 2016 | Chonburi | A | 1–2 | Saranyu 16' | 5th |
| 25 June 2016 | Suphanburi | A | 0–2 | | 5th |
| 29 June 2016 | Sukhothai | H | 2–0 | Pratum 45', Bridge 60' | 4th |
| 3 July 2016 | Buriram United | A | 1–2 | Bordin 31' | 6th |
| 10 July 2016 | BBCU | H | 2–2 | Bridge (2) 14', 36' | 6th |
| 17 July 2016 | Chainat Hornbill | A | 1–2 | Bridge 9' | 6th |
| 20 July 2016 | Super Power Samut Prakan (Note: In mid-2016, Osotspa M-150 Samut Prakan change the name to Super Power Samut Prakan due to their take over.) | H | 2–0 | Bruno 10', Bridge 73' | 6th |
| 24 July 2016 | Bangkok Glass | A | 1–3 | Bridge 74' | 7th |
| 30 July 2016 | Army United | H | 2–1 | Bruno (2) 32', 73' | 6th |
| 7 August 2016 | SCG Muangthong United | A | 0–1 | | 8th |
| 14 August 2016 | Nakhon Ratchasima Mazda | H | 1–2 | Bruno 70' | 8th |
| 20 August 2016 | Ratchaburi Mitr Phol | A | 1–1 | Kaimbi 1' | 8th |
| 10 September 2016 | BEC Tero Sasana | H | 4–2 | Bordin 10', Piyaphon 21', Bridge 35', Thitipan 73' | 8th |
| 17 September 2016 | Navy | A | 0–0 | | 8th |
| 24 September 2016 | Bangkok United | H | 0–3 | | 8th |

== Thai FA Cup ==
Chang FA Cup

| Date | Opponents | H / A | Result F–A | Scorers | Round |
|---|---|---|---|---|---|
| 15 June 2016 | BBCU | H | 6–1 | Bruno (3) 3', 15', 44', Piyaphon 62', Saruta 77', Nantawat 83' | Round of 64 |
| 13 July 2016 | Bangkok Glass | H | 2–1 | Bruno 42', Bridge 90+6' | Round of 32 |
| 3 August 2016 | Suphanburi | A | 0–1 | | Round of 16 |

== Thai League Cup ==
Toyota League Cup

| Date | Opponents | H / A | Result F–A | Scorers | Round |
|---|---|---|---|---|---|
| 10 April 2016 | BTU S.Boonmeerit United | A | 2–0 | Pichitphong 41', Eakkanit 90+2' | Round of 64 |
| 8 June 2016 | Ubon UMT United | A | 1–2 | Saruta 47' | Round of 32 |

== Squad goals statistics ==
| No. | Pos. | Name | League | FA Cup | League Cup | Total |
|---|---|---|---|---|---|---|
| 1 | GK | (Thailand) Apirak Woravong | 0 | 0 | 0 | 0 |
| 2 | DF | (Thailand) Saranyu Intarach | 1 | 0 | 0 | 1 |
| 3 | DF | (Thailand) Krissadee Prakobkong | 0 | 0 | 0 | 0 |
| 4 | DF | (Thailand) Piyaphon Phanichakul | 4 | 1 | 0 | 5 |
| 5 | DF | (Japan) Kazuki Murakami | 0 | 0 | 0 | 0 |
| 6 | MF | (Thailand) Nattapon Woratayanan | 0 | 0 | 0 | 0 |
| 7 | MF | (Thailand) Arthit Sunthornpit | 2 | 0 | 0 | 2 |
| 8 | MF | (Japan) Hironori Saruta | 1 | 1 | 1 | 3 |
| 9 | FW | (Namibia) Lazarus Kaimbi | 1 | 0 | 0 | 1 |
| 10 | MF | (Brazil) Wellington Bruno | 10 | 4 | 0 | 14 |
| 13 | FW | (Thailand) Nantawat Tansopa | 0 | 1 | 0 | 1 |
| 15 | GK | (Thailand) Intharat Apinyakool | 0 | 0 | 0 | 0 |
| 16 | MF | (Thailand) Wanchalerm Yingyong | 0 | 0 | 0 | 0 |
| 17 | FW | (Thailand) Anon Sangsanoi | 1 | 0 | 0 | 1 |
| 18 | MF | (Thailand) Yuttajak Kornchan | 0 | 0 | 0 | 0 |
| 19 | GK | (Thailand) Thanongsak Panpipat | 0 | 0 | 0 | 0 |
| 20 | DF | (Thailand) Pratum Chuthong | 1 | 0 | 0 | 1 |
| 21 | FW | (Australia) Mark Bridge | 7 | 1 | 0 | 8 |
| 22 | MF | (Thailand) Pichitphong Choeichiu | 1 | 0 | 1 | 2 |
| 23 | MF | (Thailand) Bordin Phala | 2 | 0 | 0 | 2 |
| 24 | DF | (Thailand) Worawut Namvech | 0 | 0 | 0 | 0 |
| 25 | MF | (Thailand) Saharat Kaewsangsai | 0 | 0 | 0 | 0 |
| 29 | DF | (Thailand) Kiatprawut Saiwaeo | 0 | 0 | 0 | 0 |
| 33 | MF | (Thailand) Chotipat Poomkeaw | 0 | 0 | 0 | 0 |
| 34 | DF | (Thailand) Nattapong Promsen | 0 | 0 | 0 | 0 |
| 35 | MF | (Thailand) Saharat Sienarsa | 0 | 0 | 0 | 0 |
| 36 | MF | (Thailand) Mongkol Tossakrai | 0 | 0 | 0 | 0 |
| 37 | MF | (Thailand) Ekanit Panya | 0 | 0 | 1 | 1 |
| 38 | MF | (Thailand) Thitipan Puangchan | 1 | 0 | 0 | 1 |
Out on loan
| – | FW | (Thailand) Chatchai Narkwijit | 0 | 0 | 0 | 0 |
| – | FW | (Brazil) Dennis Murillo | 5 | 0 | 0 | 5 |
Left club during season
| – | DF | (Thailand) Sakeerin Teekasom | 0 | 0 | 0 | 0 |
| – | FW | (Brazil) Danilo de Oliveira | 4 | 0 | 0 | 4 |
| – | MF | (Thailand) Saharat Kanyaroj | 0 | 0 | 0 | 0 |
| – | MF | (Thailand) Rungrath Poomchantuek | 1 | 0 | 0 | 1 |

== Transfers ==
First Thai footballer's market is opening on 27 December 2015, to 28 January 2016
Second Thai footballer's market is opening on 3 June 2016, to 30 June 2016

=== In ===
| Date | Pos. | Name | From |
|---|---|---|---|
| 22 December 2015 | MF | (Japan) Hironori Saruta | (Thailand) Port |
| 3 January 2016 | MF | (Thailand) Sakeerin Teekasom | (Thailand) Chiangmai |
| 13 January 2016 | FW | (Brazil) Dennis Murillo | (Portugal) Santa Clara |
| 13 January 2016 | MF | (Brazil) Alex Henrique | (Brazil) ASA |
| 13 January 2016 | MF | (Brazil) Wellington Bruno | (Brazil) ABC |
| 14 January 2016 | DF | (Thailand) Worawut Namvech | (Thailand) Bangkok Glass |
| 14 January 2016 | DF | (Thailand) Saharat Kaewsangsai | (Thailand) Lamphun Warrior |
| 15 January 2016 | DF | (Thailand) Saranyu Intarach | (Thailand) Police United |
| 27 February 2016 | DF | (Thailand) Piyaphon Phanichakul | (Thailand) SCG Muangthong United |
| 10 March 2016 | FW | (Brazil) Danilo de Oliveira | (Thailand) Buriram United |
| 27 May 2016 | MF | (Thailand) Thitipan Puangchan | (Thailand) SCG Muangthong United |
| 27 May 2016 | MF | (Thailand) Bordin Phala | (Thailand) Bangkok Glass |
| 7 June 2016 | DF | (Thailand) Pratum Chuthong | (Thailand) Suphanburi |
| 15 June 2016 | FW | (Australia) Mark Bridge | (Australia) Western Sydney Wanderers |
| 15 June 2016 | MF | (Thailand) Wanchalerm Yingyong | (Thailand) Chainat Hornbill |
| 21 June 2016 | FW | (Namibia) Lazarus Kaimbi | (Thailand) Bangkok Glass |

=== Out ===
| Date | Pos. | Name | To |
|---|---|---|---|
| 22 December 2015 | FW | (Brazil) Renatinho | (Albania) Skënderbeu Korçë |
| 22 December 2015 | DF | (Brazil) Fernando Abreu | (Thailand) Lampang |
| 22 December 2015 | FW | (Brazil) Renan Marques | (Thailand) Sukhothai |
| 22 December 2015 | MF | (Japan) Keita Sugimoto | (Japan) Verspah Oita |
| 22 December 2015 | MF | (Thailand) Sarun Promkaew | (Thailand) Chiangmai |
| 6 January 2016 | FW | (Thailand) Choklap Nilsang | (Thailand) Chiangmai |
| 9 June 2016 | DF | (Thailand) Sakeerin Teekasom | (Thailand) Buriram United |
| 14 June 2016 | FW | (Brazil) Danilo de Oliveira | (United Arab Emirates) Dibba Al Fujairah Club |
| 16 June 2016 | MF | (Thailand) Saharat Kanyaroj | (Thailand) PTT Rayong |
| 28 June 2016 | MF | (Thailand) Rungrath Poomchantuek | (Thailand) Ratchaburi Mitr Phol |
| 28 June 2016 | MF | (Brazil) Alex Henrique | (Brazil) América |

=== Loan in ===
| Date from | Date to | Pos. | Name | From |
|---|---|---|---|---|
| 15 June 2016 | 31 December 2016 | MF | (Thailand) Mongkol Tossakrai | (Thailand) Army United |

=== Loan out ===
| Date from | Date to | Pos. | Name | To |
|---|---|---|---|---|
| 18 June 2016 | 31 December 2016 | FW | (Thailand) Chatchai Narkwijit | (Thailand) Lampang |
| 24 June 2016 | 31 December 2016 | FW | (Brazil) Dennis Murillo | (Thailand) Super Power Samut Prakan |
