= List of Buriram United F.C. players =

Below is a list of notable footballers who have played for Buriram United.

== List of players ==
Name	Nationality	Position	Buriram career	Appearances	Goals
Kanu	Brazil	CB	2010–2011	41	6
Apichet Puttan	Thailand	RB	2006–2012	135	6
Apipoo Suntornpanavej	Thailand	AM	2009–2010	38	8
Anvar Rajabov	Uzbekistan	FW	2012	1	0
Asqar Jadigerov	Uzbekistan	MF	2012	5	1
Bouba Abbo	Cameroon	ST	2011–2012		
Chaiwut Wattana	Thailand	CM	2009		
Chalermpong Kerdkaew	Thailand	DF	2008–2012		
Choketawee Promrut	Thailand	CB	2008	15	0
Clarence Bitang	Cameroon	FW	2012	2	1
Đorđije Ćetković	Montenegro	MF	2012	1	1
Douglas	Brazil	ST	2010	11	6
Dudu	Brazil	ST	2010	21	10
Ekwalla Herman	Cameroon	CB	2011–2012	30	11
Florent Obama	Cameroon	HB	2011–	38	3
Frank Acheampong	Ghana	W	2011–2013	56	17
Frank Ohandza	Cameroon	ST	2011–	32	23
Henri Joel	Ivory Coast	DF	2009–2010	13	1
Ittipol Poolsap	Thailand	MF	2007	18	3
Jay Simpson	England	FW	2014	22	2
John Mary	Cameroon	FW	2012	3	1
Kaneung Buransook	Thailand	FW	2010	8	1
Kirati Keawsombat	Thailand	ST	2010–2012	38	8
Kittikun Jamsuwan	Thailand	GK	2010–2012	0	0
Kraikiat Beadtaku	Thailand	DF	2011–2012	4	0
Kritsakorn Kerdpol	Thailand	GK	2008		
Kritsana Wongbudee	Thailand	MF	2007–2010		
Kouadio Pascal	Ivory Coast	MF	2010		
Lamnao Singto	Laos	FW	2009	11	0
Marko Ćetković	Montenegro	MF	2012	11	1
Napat Tapketkaew	Thailand	CB	2010–2011		
Narongchai Vachiraban	Thailand	AM	2006–2009	79	12
Nattaporn Phanrit	Thailand	CB	2005–2006	46	2
Panupong Wongsa	Thailand	CB	2008–2009	55	1
Patiparn Phetphun	Thailand	HB	2008–2009	57	6
Phonlawut Donjui	Thailand	CM	2008–2009		
Pipat Thonkanya	Thailand	ST	2007–2008, 2010–2011	30	10
Rafael Souza	Brazil	CB	2011		
Ramsés Bustos	Chile	ST	2013	6	3
Rangsan Viwatchaichok	Thailand	MF	2008–2011	103	18
Rattana Petch-Aporn	Thailand	MF	2010		
Rattapon Piyawuttisakun	Thailand	DF	2008–2009	21	0
Richard Falcão	Brazil	ST	2009	2	0
Ronnachai Rangsiyo	Thailand	ST	2007–2009	39	17
Samuel P.Cunningham	Thailand	GK	2009–2010	24	0
Sarif Sainui	Thailand	FW	2011–2012	13	6
Sattrupai Sri-narong	Thailand	RW	2005–2006, 2009	37	7
Seksan Piturat	Thailand	FW	2005	10	3
Shinnosuke Honda	Japan	CB	2012–	17	4
Somjet Sattabud	Thailand	ST	2011–2012		
Songsak Chaisamak	Thailand	DF	2010	0	0
Sumanya Purisai	Thailand	MF	2011–2012	24	3
Supakit Jinajai	Thailand	ST	2003–2012	26	1
Tana Chanabut	Thailand	FW	2006–2007	24	5
Thanunchai Baribarn	Thailand	RW	2004–2006		
Teerasak Po-on	Thailand	MF	2005–2006	55	7
Suelong Sae Ma	Thailand	GK	2010–2011	0	0
Ukrit Wongmeema	Thailand	GK	2009	0	0
Watchara Mahawong	Thailand	LB	2008–2009	17	1
Weerayut Jitkuntod	Thailand	RB	2009–2010	7	1
Witsanusak Kaewruang	Thailand	GK	2009		
Yuttajak Kornchan	Thailand	CM	2007–2008, 2010–2012	58	3

== Key to positions ==
GK	Goalkeeper	RB	Right back	RW	Right winger	DF	Defender
IF	Inside Forward	LB	Left back	LW	Left winger	CB	Centre Back
FW	Forward	FB	Fullback	W	Winger	MF	Midfielder
ST	Striker	HB	Half back	AM	Attacking Midfielder	CM	Central Midfielder
