= 2010 Bangkok United F.C. season =

Bangkok United
2010 season
- Chairman: Apirak Kosayodhin
- Head Coach: Worrakon Vijanarong
- Thai Premier League: 15th
- FA Cup: Fourth Round
Home colours	Away colours

The 2010 season was Bangkok United's 7th season in the top division of Thai football. This article shows statistics of the club's players in the season, and also lists all matches that the club played in the season.

== Chronological list of events ==
- 10 November 2009: The Thai Premier League 2010 season first leg fixtures were announced.
- 1 January 2010: Worrakon Vijanarong announced as new head coach
- 17 October 2010: Bangkok United were relegated from the Thai Premier League after 7 seasons in the top flight.
- 24 October 2010: Bangkok United finished in 15th place in the Thai Premier League.

== Squad ==
Note: Flags indicate national team as defined under FIFA eligibility rules; some limited exceptions apply. Players may hold more than one non-FIFA nationality.

No.	Pos.	Nation	Player
1	GK	THA	Weera Koedpudsa (2nd vice captain)
2	DF	THA	Komkrit Camsokchuerk
3	DF	THA	Korawit Namwiset
4	DF	THA	Kriangkrai Chasang
5	DF	THA	Punnarat Klinsukon (1st vice captain)
7	DF	THA	Patiparn Phetphun (Captain)
8	MF	THA	Wittaya Madlam
9	FW	THA	Preecha Chaokla
10	MF	THA	Kittisak Siriwan
11	MF	THA	Ramthep Chaipan
12	MF	THA	Rattapon Piyawuttisakun
13	FW	THA	Kraison Panjaroen
14	MF	JPN	Masahiro Fukasawa
15	DF	THA	Songsak Hemkeaw
17	FW	THA	Noppol Pol-udom

No.	Pos.	Nation	Player
19	DF	THA	Jeera Jarernsuk
20	MF	THA	Thanakorn Pichitchaipojanart
21	FW	THA	Pollawat Pinkong
24	DF	THA	Jiranat Nontaket
26	DF	THA	Arthit Boonpa
27	FW	THA	Sarif Sainui
28	MF	THA	Nantawut Fanchaiwang
29	DF	THA	Ekkarong Wan-arom
32	MF	THA	Sattrupai Sri-narong
–	GK	THA	Naratip Phanprom
–	FW	THA	Nawawit Kaikaew
–	GK	THA	Sarawut Konglarp
–	DF	SEN	Diamanka Ousmane
–	FW	GUI	Camara Yamoussa

== Transfers ==
In

Note: Flags indicate national team as defined under FIFA eligibility rules; some limited exceptions apply. Players may hold more than one non-FIFA nationality.

No.	Pos.	Nation	Player
—	GK	THA	Naratip Phanprom (Transferred from Bangkok Glass FC)
—	FW	THA	Nawawit Kaikaew (Transferred from PTT FC)
—	GK	THA	Sarawut Konglarp (Transferred from Customs Department Phetchaburi FC)
—	DF	THA	Korrawit Namwiset (Transferred from Samut Songkhram FC)
—	DF	THA	Patiparn Phetphun (Transferred from Buriram PEA)
—	MF	THA	Sattrupai Sri-narong (Transferred from Buriram PEA)
—	MF	THA	Rattapon Piyawuttisakun (Transferred from Buriram PEA)
—	MF	JPN	Masahiro Fukasawa (Transferred from Singapore Armed Forces FC)

Out

Note: Flags indicate national team as defined under FIFA eligibility rules; some limited exceptions apply. Players may hold more than one non-FIFA nationality.

No.	Pos.	Nation	Player
—	MF	JPN	Ryuji Sueoka (Transferred to Mohun Bagan)
—	MF	THA	Suphasek Kaikaew (Transferred to Chonburi FC)
—	FW	BRA	Jose Wellington (Transferred to -)
—	DF	THA	Wuttipan Phantalee (Transferred to Police United FC)
—	GK	THA	Chayoot Nakchamnarn (Transferred to Samut Songkhram FC)
—	FW	THA	Prasert Hardjiang (Transferred to -)

== Matches ==
=== League ===
28 March 2010	Police United	1–1	Bangkok United	Bangkok
				Stadium: Thammasat Rangsit Stadium; Referee: Chanyut Phongpanomwet

6 April 2010	Osotspa Saraburi	1–2	Bangkok United	M-150 Saraburi Stadium, Saraburi
				Referee: Preecha Kangram

17 April 2010	Muangthong United	5–1	Bangkok United	Nonthaburi
				Stadium: Yamaha Stadium

24 April 2010	Royal Thai Army	1–1	Bangkok United	Bangkok
				Stadium: Thai Army Sports Stadium

1 May 2010	Bangkok United	0–3	TTM Phichit	Bangkok
				Stadium: Thai-Japanese Stadium; Referee: Apisit Aonrak

9 May 2010	Bangkok United	0–1	Pattaya United	Bangkok
				Stadium: Thai-Japanese Stadium; Referee: Preecha Kangram

28 May 2010	Bangkok United	1–1	BEC Tero Sasana	Bangkok
				Stadium: Thai-Japanese Stadium; Referee: Prathan Nasawang

1 June 2010	Buriram PEA	0–0	Bangkok United	Buriram
				Stadium: i-mobile Stadium

6 June 2010	Thai Port	3–2	Bangkok United	Bangkok
				Stadium: PAT Stadium

12 June 2010	Bangkok United	0–0	Rajnavy Rayong	Bangkok
				Stadium: Thai-Japanese Stadium

19 June 2010	Bangkok United	1–4	Bangkok Glass	Bangkok
				Stadium: Thai-Japanese Stadium

27 June 2010	TOT-CAT	1–0	Bangkok United	Nonthaburi
				Stadium: Yamaha Stadium

4 July 2010	Samut Songkhram	0–2	Bangkok United	Samut Songkhram
				Stadium: Samut Songkhram Stadium

10 July 2010	Chonburi	2–1	Bangkok United	Chonburi
				Stadium: IPE Chonburi Stadium

14 July 2010	Bangkok United	0–1	Sisaket	Bangkok
				Stadium: Thai-Japanese Stadium

18 July 2010	BEC Tero Sasana	3–0	Bangkok United	Bangkok
				Stadium: Thephasadin Stadium

24 July 2010	Bangkok United	0–4	Police United	Bangkok
				Stadium: Thai-Japanese Stadium

28 July 2010	Bangkok United	1–4	Osotspa Saraburi	Bangkok
				Stadium: Thai-Japanese Stadium

7 August 2010	Bangkok United	2–0	Buriram PEA	Bangkok
				Stadium: Rangsit Stadium

14 August 2010	Bangkok United	0–3	Muangthong United	Bangkok
				Stadium: Thai-Japanese Stadium

18 August 2010	Bangkok United	0–1	Royal Thai Army	Bangkok
				Stadium: Thai-Japanese Stadium

22 August 2010	TTM Phichit	2–1	Bangkok United	Phichit
				Stadium: Phichit Stadium

12 September 2010	Bangkok United	3–1	Chonburi	Bangkok
				Stadium: Thai-Japanese Stadium

19 September 2010	Sisaket	1–1	Bangkok United	Sisaket
				Stadium: Sisaket Stadium

26 September 2010	Bangkok United	1–1	Thai Port	Bangkok
				Stadium: Thai-Japanese Stadium

29 September 2010	Rajnavy Rayong	1–1	Bangkok United	Rayong
17.oo UTC+7				Stadium: Rayong Stadium

2 October 2010	Bangkok Glass	4–0	Bangkok United	Pathumthani
				Stadium: Leo Stadium

10 October 2010	Pattaya United	1–2	Bangkok United	Pattaya
				Stadium: Nongprue Municipality Football Field

17 October 2010	Bangkok United	1–2	TOT-CAT	Bangkok
				Stadium: Thai-Japanese Stadium

24 October 2010	Bangkok United	0–0	SCG Samut Songkhram	Bangkok
16.30 UTC+7				Stadium: Rangsit Stadium; Referee: Prathan Nasawang

==== League table ====
Pos	Team	Pld	W	D	L	GF	GA	GD	Pts	Qualification or relegation
12	TOT-CAT	30	9	6	15	23	42	−19	33	
13	TTM Phichit	30	7	11	12	32	46	−14	32	
14	Sisaket	30	6	8	16	36	54	−18	26	Promotion/relegation play-off
15	Bangkok United (R)	30	5	9	16	25	52	−27	24	Promotion/relegation play-off
16	Royal Thai Army	30	5	7	18	27	54	−27	22	Promotion/relegation play-off

Updated to match(es) played on 24 October 2010. Source: FIFA.com
Rules for classification: 1st points; 2nd head-to-head; 3rd match win; 4th goal difference; 5th number of goals scored
(R) Relegated

=== FA Cup ===
==== Third round ====
31 July 2010	Bangkok United	4–2	Khonkaen	Bangkok
				Stadium: Thai-Japanese Stadium

==== Fourth round ====
7 September 2010	Rajnavy Rayong	3–1	Bangkok United	Rayong
				Stadium: Rayong Stadium

=== League Cup ===
==== First round ====
===== 1st leg =====
29 August 2010	Hat Yai	0–3	Bangkok United	Songkhla
				Stadium: Jiranakorn Stadium

===== 2nd leg =====
1 September 2010	Bangkok United	7–0	Hat Yai	Bangkok
				Stadium: Thai-Japanese Stadium

==== Second round ====
===== 1st leg =====
14 September 2010	Narathiwat	0–4	Bangkok United	Narathiwat
				Stadium: Narathiwat Central Stadium

===== 2nd leg =====
4 October 2010	Bangkok United	5–2	Narathiwat	Bangkok
				Stadium: Thai-Japanese Stadium

=== Bangkok Charity Cup ===
1 February 2010	Bangkok United	1 – 1 won on pens	TTM Phichit	Bangkok
18:30 UTC+7				Stadium: Thai-Japanese Stadium

3 February 2010	Bangkok United	1 – 1; 7 – 6 pens	Police United	Bangkok
18:30 UTC+7				Stadium: Thai-Japanese Stadium
