= Thong (disambiguation) =

Thong is a type of narrow garment that primarily covers the pubic area.

Thong may also refer to:

- Thong, Kent, a village in England
- Thong (shoe) or flip-flops, a type of sandal
- Thong (surname), a Chinese and Cambodian surname
- Thōng (surname) or Chang, a Chinese surname
- Thongchai Sukkoki or Thong (born 1973), footballer from Thailand
- Thongchai Rathchai or Thong (born 1982), footballer from Thailand

== See also ==
- Thongchai, a Thai name
