= Napat Tapketkaew =

Thai footballer (born 1982)

Personal information
- Full name: Napat Tapketkaew
- Date of birth: June 29, 1982 (age 44)
- Place of birth: Sing Buri, Thailand
- Height: 1.77 m (5 ft 9 1/2 in)
- Position: Defender

Senior career*
Years	Team	Apps	(Gls)
2007–2009	TOT	52	(1)
2010–2011	Buriram PEA		
2012–2013	Chainat	4	(0)
2014–2015	Thai Honda		
- * Club domestic league appearances and goals as of 13 July 2011 ‡ National team caps and goals as of 13 July 2011

Napat Tapketkaew (Thai: ณภัทร ทับเกตุแก้ว, born June 29, 1982) is a retired professional footballer from Thailand.

== Honours ==
=== Club ===
Buriram PEA

- Thai Premier League Champions (1) : 2011
- Thai FA Cup winner (1) : 2011
- Thai League Cup winner (1) : 2011

Thai Honda

- Regional League Bangkok Area Division Champions (1) : 2014
