= Altamir Heitor Martins =

Brazilian footballer (1980-2012)

Personal information
- Date of birth: January 14, 1980
- Place of birth: São Paulo, Brazil
- Date of death: March 1, 2012 (aged 32)
- Place of death: Curitiba, Brazil
- Height: 1.85 m (6 ft 1 in)
- Position: Center back

Youth career
- Ceres

Senior career*
Years	Team	Apps	(Gls)
2005	Guarani		
2006–2007	National București	3	(0)
2007–2009	Progresul București	10	(1)
2009–2010	Paykan	2	(0)
2010–2012	BEC Tero Sasana		
- * Club domestic league appearances and goals

Altamir Heitor Martins (January 14, 1980 – March 1, 2012) was a Brazilian professional footballer who played for BEC Tero Sasana F.C.

== Career ==
Martins transferred from Guarani Futebol Clube to FC National București in October 2006. He made three appearances for National in Liga I during the 2006–07 season. The defender joined in summer 2009 from Romanian second league side FC Progresul București to Paykan F.C. After a half year with Paykan F.C. was released and moved to Thai club BEC Tero Sasana F.C. Then few months later with BEC Tero Sasana F.C., he was released.

== Death ==
In March 2012, Martins died in Curitiba aged 32.
