= Ekele Udojoh =

Nigerian footballer

Personal information
- Full name: Ekele Udojoh
- Date of birth: 29 September 1989 (age 37)
- Place of birth: Lagos, Nigeria
- Height: 5 ft 11 in (1.80 m)
- Position: Forward

Team information
- Current team: Malkiya Club

Senior career*
Years	Team	Apps	(Gls)
2006	Babanawa F.C.	17	(8)
2007	First Bank F.C.	21	(11)
2008	Sharks F.C.	14	(9)
2009–2010	Deportes La Serena	16	(19)
2011	BEC Tero Sasana F.C.	12	(17)
2011–2012	C.S. Marítimo	0	(0)
2013	Malkiya	16	(7)
2014	Zejtun	2	(6)
- * Club domestic league appearances and goals

Ekele Udojoh (born 29 September 1989) is a Nigerian footballer who currently plays for Malkiya Club of Bahrain. Ekele is a gifted attacker with good goal sense, strong and fast. He can play from any part of the attack.
