= Intharat Apinyakool =

Thai footballer (born 1982)

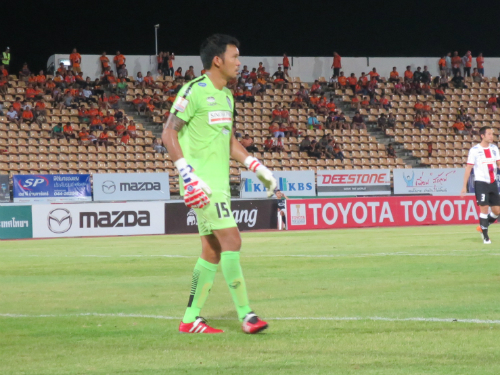

Personal information
- Full name: Intharat Apinyakool
- Date of birth: 30 May 1982 (age 44)
- Place of birth: Kalasin, Thailand
- Height: 1.81 m (5 ft 11 1/2 in)
- Position: Goalkeeper

Youth career
- 2000: Bangkok Christian College

Senior career*
Years	Team	Apps	(Gls)
2001–2004	Bangkok Christian College	39	(0)
2007	Thai Airways	16	(0)
2008	Tobacco Monopoly	21	(0)
2009–2010	BEC Tero Sasana	0	(0)
2010	Police United	0	(0)
2011–2012	Chanthaburi	19	(0)
2012	Esan United	2	(0)
2013–2016	Chiangrai United	93	(0)
2017–2018	Navy	45	(0)
2019	Simork	3	(0)
2019	Navy	11	(0)
Total		249	(20)

International career
1998–1999	Thailand U17		
- * Club domestic league appearances and goals as of 4 September 2019

Intharat Apinyakool (Thai: อินทรัตน์ อภิญญากุล, born 30 May 1982) is a Thai retired professional footballer who played as a goalkeeper.

== International career ==
He played for Thailand at the 1999 FIFA U-17 World Championship in New Zealand and the 2005 FIFA Beach Soccer World Cup in Brazil.

== Honours ==
=== Club ===
Bangkok Christian College

- Thai Division 1 League (1): 2001–02
