= Sakeereen Teekasom =

Thai footballer (born 1990)

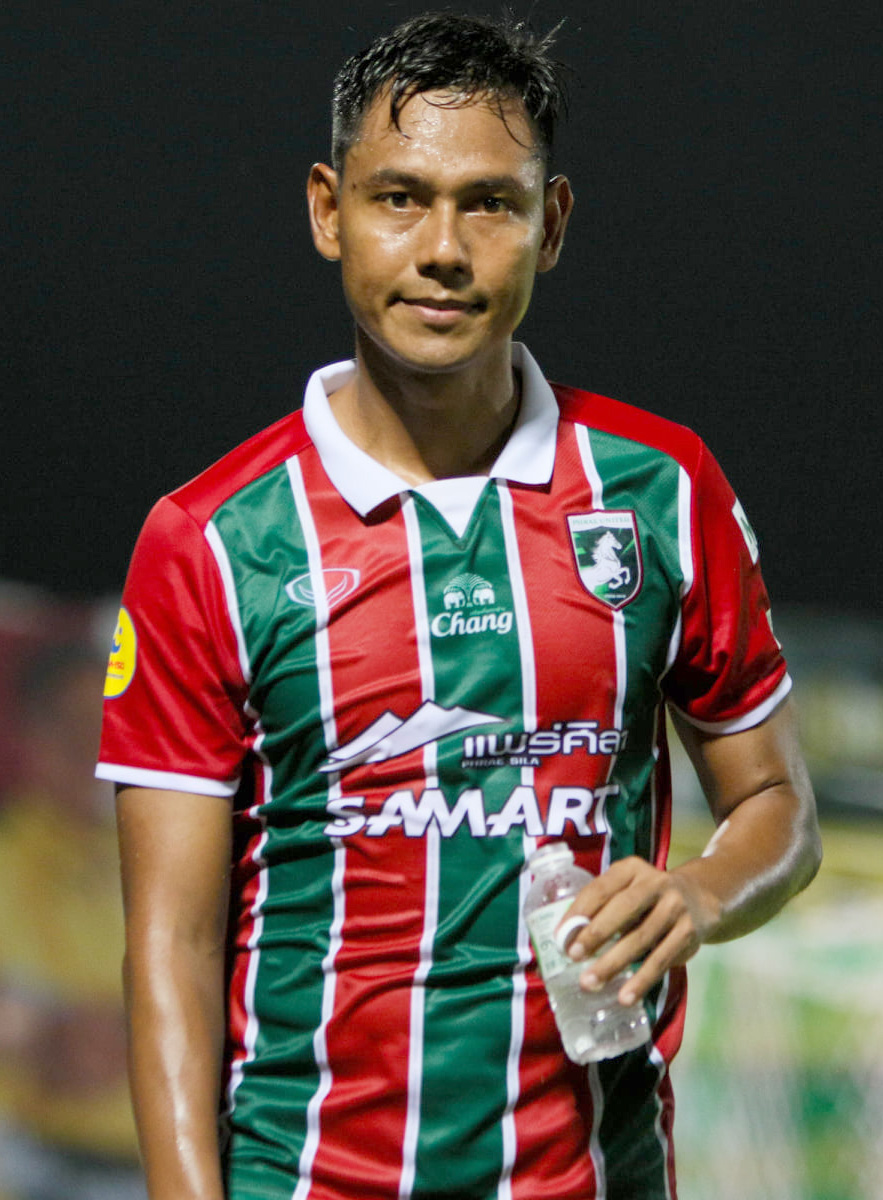
- Sakeereen Teekasom playing for Phrae United

Personal information
- Full name: Sakeereen Cristian Teekasom
- Date of birth: 27 February 1990 (age 36)
- Place of birth: Satun, Thailand
- Height: 1.78 m (5 ft 10 in)
- Position: Right back

Youth career
- 2008–2009: Satun United

Senior career*
Years	Team	Apps	(Gls)
2009	Satun United		
2010	Chiangmai		
2011	Lamphun Warrior		
2012	Chiangmai		
2012	Pattani		
2013–2014	Songkhla United	34	(1)
2015	Chiangmai	32	(6)
2016	Chiangrai United	12	(0)
2016–2017	Buriram United	3	(0)
2017–2019	BG Pathum United	11	(2)
2018	→ Navy (loan)	8	(0)
2019	Chiangmai		
2019	JL Chiangmai United	8	(0)
2020	Pattani	1	(0)
2020–2021	Maejo United	14	(5)
2021–2022	Phrae United	20	(0)
2022–2023	Jalor City	20	(4)
2023	Nara United	5	(0)
2023–2024	Muang Trang United	10	(1)
2024	Maejo United	7	(3)
2024–2025	Pattani	15	(3)
2025–2026	PT Satun	9	(0)
- * Club domestic league appearances and goals as of 11 May 2026

Sakeereen Teekasom (Thai: ซากีรีน ตีกาสม, born 27 February 1990), simply known as Cristian (Thai: คริสเตียน), is a Thai professional footballer who plays as a right back and defensive area.

== Honours ==
=== Club ===
Satun United

- Regional League South Division runners-up: 2009

Chiangmai

- Regional League Northern Division (1) : 2010

Lamphun Warrior

- Regional League Championships Group Stage: 2011

Pattani

- Regional League Championships Group Stage: 2012

Buriram United

- Mekong Club Championship: 2016
