= Franck Ohandza =

Cameroonian footballer

Personal information
- Full name: Franck Ohandza Zoa
- Date of birth: 28 September 1991 (age 35)
- Place of birth: Ngong, Cameroon
- Height: 1.79 m (5 ft 10 1/2 in)
- Position: Forward

Youth career
- Daga Young Stars

Senior career*
Years	Team	Apps	(Gls)
2011–2012	Buriram United	22	(19)
2012–2014	Greuther Fürth	0	(0)
2013–2014	→ Iraklis Psachna (loan)	20	(2)
2014–2015	Sesvete	22	(15)
2015–2018	Hajduk Split	50	(18)
2018	Shenzhen FC	23	(18)
2019–2020	Henan Jianye	21	(10)
2022	Heilongjiang Ice City	7	(0)

International career
2011	Cameroon U20	12	(10)
- * Club domestic league appearances and goals as of 31 December 2019 (UTC)

Franck Ohandza Zoa (born 28 September 1991) is a Cameroonian professional footballer who plays as a forward.

== Club career ==
Born in Ngong, Cameroon, Ohandza began playing football for the youth side of local club Daga Young Stars. At age 19 Ohandza signed for Buriram PEA F.C. of the Thai Premier League where he became the league's topscorer in his first season as professional. He scored a hat-trick in a league match against Samut Songkhram F.C. on 24 May 2011.

After his impressive feats at Buriram, Ohandza moved to SpVgg Greuther Fürth in mid-2012, with the German club just having managed to achieve promotion to the Bundesliga. He failed to make a single appearance for the first team that season, though.

Subsequently, Ohandza moved to Greek side Iraklis Psachna F.C. on loan for the 2013-14 Greek Football League season. There, Ohandza managed two goals in 20 league appearances, 13 of those appearances coming off the bench.

Franck Ohandza then moved to Croatian second division side NK Sesvete, signing a one-year contract for the 2014-15 Croatian Second Division season. The move was facilitated by Sesvete's parent club GNK Dinamo Zagreb. The powerful striker had a strong campaign, netting 15 times in 22 games for Sesvete as the club finished runner-up.

=== Hajduk Split ===
His performances for NK Sesvete didn't go unnoticed and Ohandza joined Croatian first division HNK Hajduk Split on 15 June 2015. He signed a two-year contract. Ohandza made his Hajduk debut in a Europa League qualifier against Estonian side JK Sillamäe Kalev, playing 90 minutes in a 1-1 draw, assisting Hajduk's only goal. In the return leg at Poljud Stadium, Ohandza netted his first two goals in a Hajduk jersey and grabbed another assist, as the Split based side won by an emphatic scoreline of 6-2 to advance to the next round. In the next match, the Eternal derby, Ohandza got his third assist in as many games as Hajduk managed a valuable 1-1 draw away from home against Dinamo Zagreb. Ohandza continued his good early form at Hajduk, as he scored and assisted in the return leg of Hajduk's third-round Europa League qualifier against Strømsgodset Toppfotball, helping the side progress with a 4-0 aggregate scoreline. The striker scored his first league goal for Hajduk in Round 8, in a 2-0 away win against Inter Zaprešić. Ohandza sustained an injury in the second Eternal Derby of the season on 19 September and was out for the next six months of. He made his return to football on 10 April 2016 against NK Istra 1961 on home ground. At the end of the season, it was reported that he was in need of another operation due to his injury.

Ohandza started the 2016-17 by scoring three minutes after coming on as a half-time substitute in a 2-2 away draw with Politehnica Iași on 14 July 2016, at the Emil Alexandrescu Stadium in Romania, in the Second Round of the 2016–17 UEFA Europa League qualifying. It was his first official appearance since 24 April 2016. Ohandza also scored in the return leg, a 90th-minute winner as Hajduk beat Iași 2-1 on the day and 4-3 on aggregate. Ohandza then made it three consecutive goals in Europa League qualifiers, scoring a stoppage time goal as Hajduk beat FC Oleksandriya 3-0 away from home. Ohandza only came on in the 68th minute, making it three goals in just 120 minutes of football.

=== China ===
On 27 February 2018, Ohandza signed for China League One club Shenzhen FC. He signed a two-year contract worth a reported €1.2m euro per annum. The transfer fee was report to be €1.2m. Ohandza scored 18 goals and assisted 9 times in 23 appearances for Shenzhen in the 2018 season, as Shenzhen won promotion to the Chinese Super League.

Ohandza transferred to Chinese Super League side Henan Jianye in February 2019.

== International career ==
Ohandza has represented Cameroon at youth level, scoring one goal in four appearances at the 2011 FIFA U-20 World Cup finals in Colombia.

== Career statistics ==
As of 31 December 2019.

Appearances and goals by club, season and competition
Club	Season	League			National Cup		League Cup		Continental		Other		Total	
Club	Season	Division	Apps	Goals	Apps	Goals	Apps	Goals	Apps	Goals	Apps	Goals	Apps	Goals
Buriram United	2011	Thai Premier League	22	19	4	0	6	3	–		–		32	22
Buriram United	2012	Thai Premier League	0	0	0	0	0	0	6	2	0 (Note: Appearances in Kor Royal Cup)	0	6	2
Buriram United	Total		22	19	4	0	6	3	6	2	0	0	38	24
Greuther Fürth	2012–13	Bundesliga	0	0	0	0	–		–		–		0	0
Iraklis Psachna (loan)	2013–14	Football League	20	2	0	0	–		–		–		20	2
Sesvete	2014–15	2. HNL	22	15	0	0	–		–		–		22	15
Hajduk Split	2015–16	1. HNL	8	1	0	0	–		6	3	–		14	4
Hajduk Split	2016–17	1. HNL	24	8	1	0	–		6	3	–		31	11
Hajduk Split	2017–18	1. HNL	18	9	1	1	–		4	1	–		23	11
Hajduk Split	Total		50	18	2	1	0	0	16	7	0	0	68	26
Shenzhen FC	2018	China League One	23	18	0	0	–		–		–		23	18
Henan Jianye	2019	Chinese Super League	21	10	0	0	–		–		–		21	10
Heilongjiang Ice City	2022	China League One	0	0	0	0	–		–		–		0	0
Career total			158	82	6	1	6	3	22	9	0	0	192	95

== Honours ==
=== Club ===
Buriram PEA F.C.

- Thai Premier League: 2011
- Thai FA Cup: 2011
- Thai League Cup: 2011

=== Individual ===
- 2011 Thai Premier League: Golden Boot
