= Alex Henrique =

Brazilian footballer (born 1985)

Personal information
- Full name: Alex Henrique José
- Date of birth: March 20, 1985 (age 41)
- Place of birth: São Paulo, Brazil
- Height: 1.82 m (6 ft 0 in)
- Position: Midfielder

Team information
- Current team: Aparecidense

Senior career*
Years	Team	Apps	(Gls)
2009	Avispa Fukuoka	5	(0)
2010	Votoraty	6	(0)
2010–2011	Thespa Kusatsu	43	(10)
2012	Tokyo Verdy	9	(1)
2013	Comercial-SP	0	(0)
2013	CSA	18	(3)
2014–2015	ASA	36	(8)
2016	América RN	7	(1)
2017	CSA	14	(2)
2017	Moto Club	11	(0)
2018–2021	Aparecidense	88	(43)
2018	→ Vila Nova (loan)	25	(6)
2019	→ Sampaio Corrêa (loan)	7	(0)
2019	→ Pelotas (loan)	3	(1)
2021	Confiança	9	(1)
2021–	Aparecidense	15	(8)
- * Club domestic league appearances and goals

Alex Henrique José (born March 20, 1985) is a Brazilian football player who currently plays as a midfielder for Aparecidense.

== Club statistics ==
Club performance			League		Cup		Total	
Season	Club	League	Apps	Goals	Apps	Goals	Apps	Goals
Japan			League		Emperor's Cup		Total	
2009	Avispa Fukuoka	J2 League	5	0	0	0	5	0
2010	Thespa Kusatsu	J2 League	7	3	1	1	8	4
2011	Thespa Kusatsu	J2 League	34	9			34	9
2012	Tokyo Verdy	J2 League	9	1	0	0	9	1
Country	Japan		55	13	1	1	56	14
Total			55	13	1	1	56	14
