= Piyakul Kaewnamkang =

Thai footballer and manager

Personal information
- Full name: Piyakul Kaewnamkang
- Place of birth: Thailand

Managerial career
- Years: Team
- 2007: Rajnavy
- 2011–2012: Thailand women
- 2012: Thai Port
- ‡ National team caps and goals as of October 19, 2012

Piyakul Kaewnamkang (ปิยะกุล แก้วน้ำค้าง) is a thai former football player and football coach. He also work as sport commentator for TrueVisions.

== Honours ==
- 2011 AFF Women's Championship Winner; 2011 with Thailand (Women's)
