= 3K Battery =

Automotive battery company

Thai Storage Battery Public Company Limited
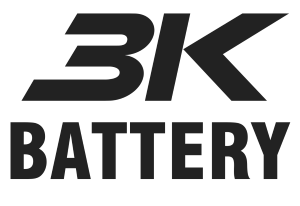
- Trade name: 3K Battery
- Native name: บริษัท ไทยสโตเรจ แบตเตอรี่ จำกัด
- Traded as: SET: BAT-3K, ABBV: TSB
- Industry: Automotive battery
- Founded: 10 June 1986; 39 years ago
- Headquarters: Thailand
- Website: www.3kbattery.com

3K Battery is a brand of automotive and motorcycle batteries in Thailand and other international markets. The products are marketed by Thai Storage Battery Public Company Limited (SET: BAT-3K, ABBV: TSB), which manufactures and distributes these batteries. TSB was established on 10 June 1986.

The company recently delayed a major investment in Thailand due to investor pressures. The company's shares (BAT-3K) are traded on the Stock Exchange of Thailand (SET).

The company closed in mid-2017 due to the heavy losses.
