= Diego Martins (footballer, born 1987) =

Brazilian footballer

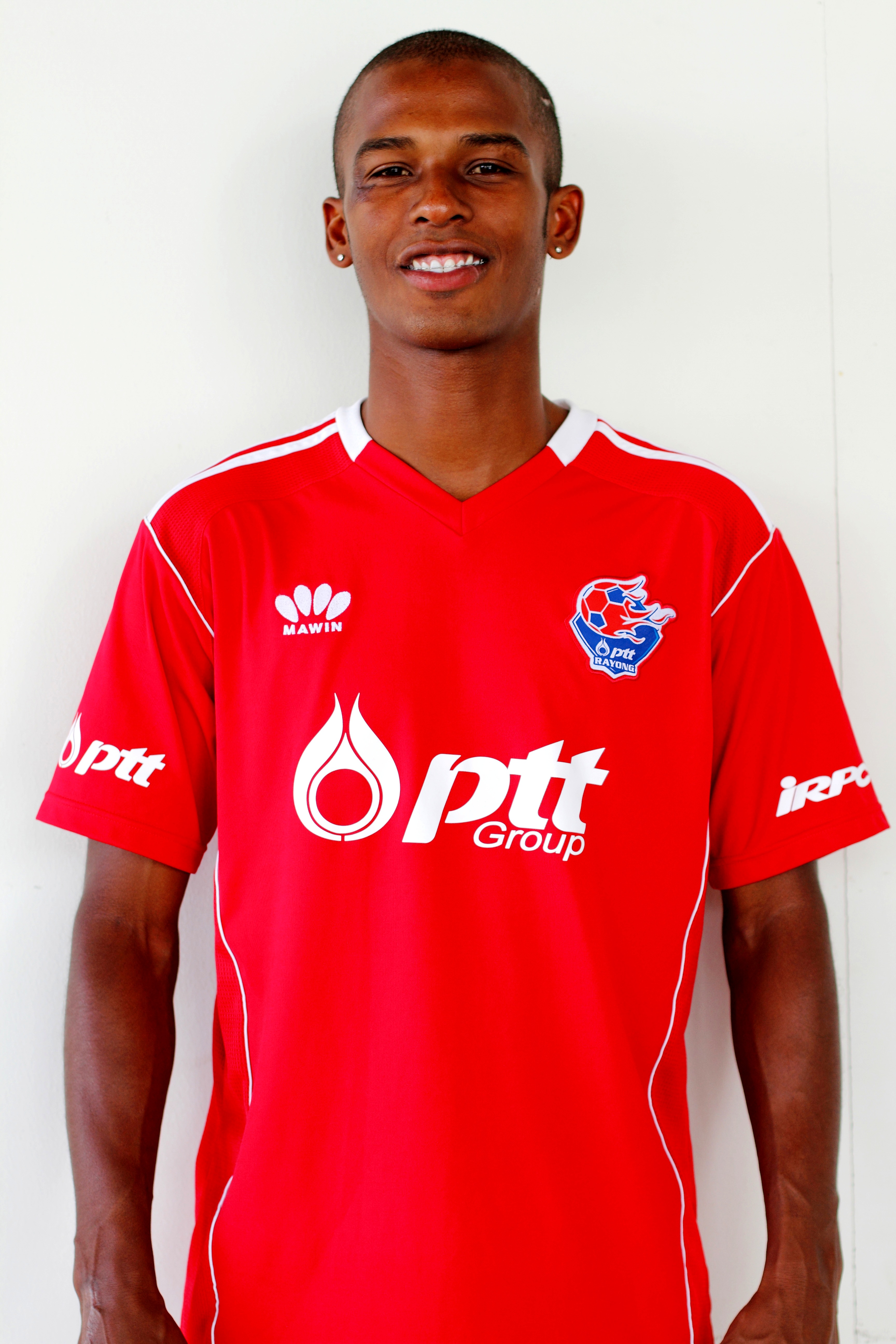
- Diego Martins, 2011

Personal information
- Full name: Diego Jota Martins
- Date of birth: 4 February 1987 (age 39)
- Place of birth: Joinville, Santa Catarina, Brazil
- Height: 1.83 m (6 ft 0 in)
- Position: Midfielder

Youth career
- Joinville
- Coritiba

Senior career*
Years	Team	Apps	(Gls)
2003–2010	Coritiba	7	
2008	América de Rio Preto	8	
2008–2009	Marcílio Dias	17	
2009	Brasil de Pelotas	21	(0)
2009–2010	Avenida	7	
2010	TTM F.C.	10	(1)
2011	PTT Rayong	16	(1)
2012	Motor Lublin	7	(0)
2013	Metropolitano		
2014	FC Jazz	24	(1)
2015	Lanexang United	18	(2)
2016	Inter Pattaya	10	(1)
2017	Yasothon	5	(0)
2018	SJK Seinäjoki	12	(0)
2019	Atlantis	22	(1)
2020	Atlantis FC/Akatemia	14	(1)
2021	FC Finnkurd	18	(1)
- * Club domestic league appearances and goals

Diego Jota Martins (born 4 February 1987) is a Brazilian former professional footballer who played as a midfielder.

Martins was born in Joinville, Brazil. He has played for top-level Brazilian club Coritiba Football Club for seven years, having five years of professional contract. He has previously played for several teams in Brazil and for TTM F.C. and PTT Rayong F.C. in the Thai Premier League. In the 2012–13 season he played seven matches for Motor Lublin in the Polish II liga. Martins was signed by FC Jazz in April 2014 with a year-long contract appearing on 28 matches in that season.
