= Yannick Ossok =

Cameroonian footballer

Personal information
- Full name: Yannick Dieudonné Ossok
- Date of birth: 6 June 1986 (age 40)
- Place of birth: Cameroon
- Position: Defender

Senior career*
Years	Team	Apps	(Gls)
20??–2008	Chonburi F.C.		
2008–2009	BEC Tero Sasana		
2009	P-Iirot		
2009–2010	Salon Palloilijat		
2010–2011	Għajnsielem F.C.		
2011–2012	Mosta F.C.	28	(0)
2012–2013	Police United F.C.	27+	(0+)
2014	Nonthaburi F.C.		
2014–2015	Mosta F.C.	7	(0)
2015	Għajnsielem F.C.		
2016–	Pargas IF	40	(2)
- * Club domestic league appearances and goals

Yannick Ossok (born 6 June 1986 in Cameroon) is a Cameroonian footballer who plays for Pargas IF in Finland as of 2016.

== Career ==
=== Thailand ===
Snapped up by Police United mid-season 2012, Ossok was picked for the Thai Premier League foreign all-stars team for a friendly opposing Thailand that year and made the Thai Premier League's Round 18 Team of the Week for his defensive performances which prevented Bangkok United from taking three points.

=== Malta ===
With Mosta for 2011–12, the Cameroonian was Man of the Match by holding Birkirkara 0-0 but slapped with a two-match suspension for gratuitous violence ahead of the Maltese FA Trophy quarter finals. Returning to Mosta in 2014–15, he finished the season with Għajnsielem, wearing the number 15.

=== Finland ===
Examined by Pallo-Iirot in spring 2009, the centre-back came to terms on a deal with them lasting until the end of the year, penciling in an agreement with Salon Palloilijat that December. before heading to Malta and putting a dent in their defensive line.
