= Wellington Bruno =

Brazilian footballer (born 1986)

Personal information
- Full name: Wellington Bruno da Silva
- Date of birth: 25 April 1986 (age 40)
- Place of birth: Guarulhos, Brazil
- Height: 1.74 m (5 ft 8 1/2 in)
- Position: Attacking midfielder

Team information
- Current team: São Bento

Senior career*
Years	Team	Apps	(Gls)
2007	XV de Jau		
2007	Noroeste		
2008	Inter de Limeira		
2008	Ferroviária		
2009	União São João		
2009	Comercial-SP		
2010	Atlético Alagoinhas	16	(0)
2010	CSA	0	(0)
2011	América (Teófilo Otoni)	12	(2)
2011–2012	Ipatinga	36	(10)
2012	Flamengo	11	(0)
2013	Ponte Preta	11	(0)
2013	Joinville	24	(1)
2014	Botafogo-SP	15	(2)
2014	Criciúma	9	(0)
2015	Penapolense	4	(0)
2015	ABC	20	(0)
2016	Chiangrai United	31	(10)
2017	Chiangmai		
2017–2018	PTT Rayong		
2019	Botafogo-SP	3	(0)
2020–	São Bento	10	(1)
- * Club domestic league appearances and goals as of 14:23, 1 May 2019 (UTC)

Wellington Bruno da Silva (born 25 April 1986) is a Brazilian footballer who plays as an attacking midfielder for São Bento. He has previously played in Campeonato Brasileiro Série A for Flamengo and Criciúma, and in Campeonato Brasileiro Série B for Ipatinga, Joinville and ABC. He has also played in Thai League 1 for Chiangrai United.
