= Ulrich Munze =

Cameroonian footballer

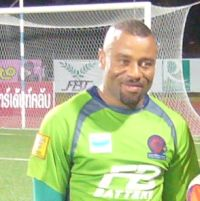

Personal information
- Full name: Ulrich Munze
- Date of birth: 5 April 1984 (age 42)
- Place of birth: Yaoundé, Cameroon
- Height: 1.78 m (5 ft 10 in)
- Position: Goalkeeper

Team information
- Current team: Nagaworld FC (goalkeeper coach)

Youth career
- 2005–2007: Cicam Garoua A.S.

Senior career*
Years	Team	Apps	(Gls)
2008	Huế F.C.	4	(0)
2009–2012	Thai Port	67	(0)
2012	Esan United	29	(0)
2013	Nakhon Ratchasima	15	(0)
2014–2015	Prachuap	34	(0)
2016	Assumption United	10	(0)
Total		159	(0)
- * Club domestic league appearances and goals

Ulrich Munze (born 7 May 1984 in Yaoundé) is a Cameroonian football coach and former player.

== Club career ==
He played for Thai Port from 2009. The 2010 season had Munze and Pattarakorn Thanganuruck sharing the goalkeeping assignments for the Khlong Toei side. In December 2010, Thanganurat departed to Police United and Munze signed a new two-year contract.

Despite making errors in the opening game of the 2011 season, a defeat to Chonburi, he was described as "one of the better goalkeepers in the league". With the club in financial difficulties, Munze's contract was revoked in January 2012, but he was permitted to play in the 2011 Thai League Cup Final, delayed for several months because of flooding, which Buriram PEA won 2–0 to complete the domestic treble. He joined Esan United for the 2012 season.
