= Jiranat Nontaket =

Thai footballer (born 1988)

Rawin Nontaket
Personal information
- Full name: Rawin Nontaket
- Date of birth: 19 June 1988 (age 38)
- Place of birth: Phuket, Thailand
- Height: 1.66 m (5 ft 5 1/2 in)
- Position: Left back

Team information
- Current team: Phrae United
- Number: 44

Youth career
- 2004–2006: Assumption College Sriracha

Senior career*
Years	Team	Apps	(Gls)
2007–2010	Bangkok United	24	(0)
2011–2015	TOT	94	(0)
2015–2017	PTT Rayong	26	(1)
2017–2019	Samut Sakhon	21	(0)
2020–	Phrae United		
- * Club domestic league appearances and goals as of 10:05, 6 September 2017 (UTC)

Rawin Nontaket (Thai: จีรณัฐ นนทเกษ, (born 19 June 1988) is a Thai professional footballer who plays for Phrae United.
