= Bina Ajuwa =

Nigerian footballer

Personal information
- Full name: Binaware Williams Ajuwa
- Date of birth: 30 January 1982 (age 44)
- Place of birth: Lagos, Nigeria
- Height: 1.84 m (6 ft 0 in)
- Position: Midfielder

Senior career*
| Years | Team | Apps | (Gls) |
| 1997 | Puma Lagos | | |
| 1997–1998 | Dragons de l'Ouémé | | |
| 1998–1999 | Celta Vigo B | | |
| 1999–2001 | Benfica B | 4 | (0) |
| 2001–2002 | Felgueiras | 6 | (1) |
| 2002 | Fazedense | | |
| 2003 | ES Viry-Châtillon | 13 | (0) |
| 2003–2004 | Östersund | 27 | (3) |
| 2005 | Pahang | | |
| 2006–2008 | Național București | 8 | (0) |
| 2009–2010 | Vizela | 7 | (0) |
| 2010 | Monsanto | 12 | (2) |
| 2011 | BEC Tero Sasana | | |
| Total | | 77 | (6) |

International career
| 2001–2003 | Nigeria | 3 | (0) |
- * Club domestic league appearances and goals

Binaware Williams "Bina" Ajuwa (born 30 January 1982) is a Nigerian former professional footballer who played as a midfielder.
