= Thanakorn Pichitchaipojanart =

Thai footballer (born 1983)

Personal information
- Full name: Thanakorn Pichitchaipojanart
- Date of birth: May 25, 1983 (age 43)
- Place of birth: Ratchaburi, Thailand
- Height: 1.71 m (5 ft 7 1/2 in)
- Position: Midfielder

Team information
- Current team: Bangkok United
- Number: 20

Senior career*
Years	Team	Apps	(Gls)
2004–present	Bangkok United	31	(2)
- * Club domestic league appearances and goals as of 14 November 2008

Thanakorn Pichitchaipojanart is a Former footballer from Thailand. Last club he plays for Bangkok United .
