= Yuttajak Kornchan =

Thai footballer (born 1982)

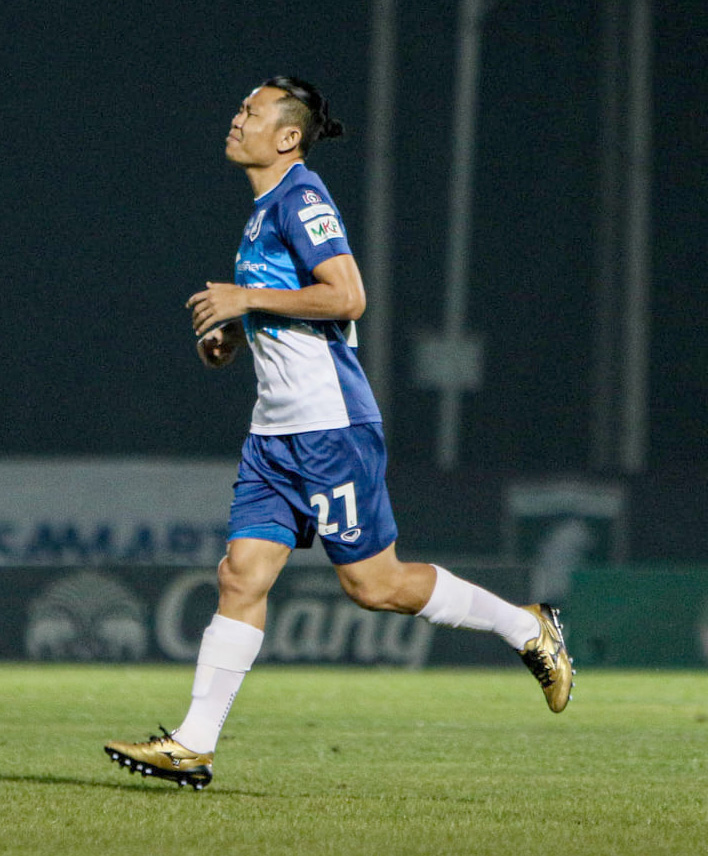
- Yuttajak Kornchan playing for Phrae United

Personal information
- Full name: Yuttajak Kornchan
- Date of birth: 31 May 1982 (age 44)
- Place of birth: Nan, Thailand
- Height: 1.74 m (5 ft 8 1/2 in)
- Positions: Defensive midfielder; centre-back

Senior career*
Years	Team	Apps	(Gls)
2003–2004	Hoàng Anh Gia Lai	15	(0)
2005–2006	An Giang	20	(1)
2007–2008	PEA	19	(0)
2009–2010	Pelita Jaya	27	(2)
2010–2012	Buriram United	21	(2)
2012–2013	Chainat	13	(0)
2014–2016	Chiangrai United	70	(0)
2017	Navy	22	(0)
2018–2019	Chiangrai United	1	(0)
2018–2019	→ Chiangmai (loan)	9	(0)
2020–2022	Phrae United	38	(1)
Total		255	(6)

International career
2005	Thailand U23		
2004–2015	Thailand	5	(1)
- * Club domestic league appearances and goals

Yuttajak Kornchan (Thai: ยุทธจักร ก้อนจันทร์, born 31 May 1982), simply known as Nhon (Thai: หนอน), is a Thai retired professional footballer who plays as a defensive midfielder.

== International career ==
Yuttajak was included in Thailand's 2004 AFF Championship squad.

=== International goals ===
#	Date	Venue	Opponent	Score	Competition
1.	December 12, 2004	Bukit Jalil National Stadium, Malaysia	Timor-Leste	8–0	2004 Tiger Cup

== Honours ==
=== Club ===
Hoàng Anh Gia Lai

- V-League (1): 2004

Buriram United

- Thai Premier League (2): 2008, 2011
- Thai FA Cup (1): 2011
- Thai League Cup (1): 2011

=== International ===
Thailand U-23

- Southeast Asian Games Gold Medal (1): 2005
