= Saharat Kaewsangsai =

Thai footballer (born 1994)

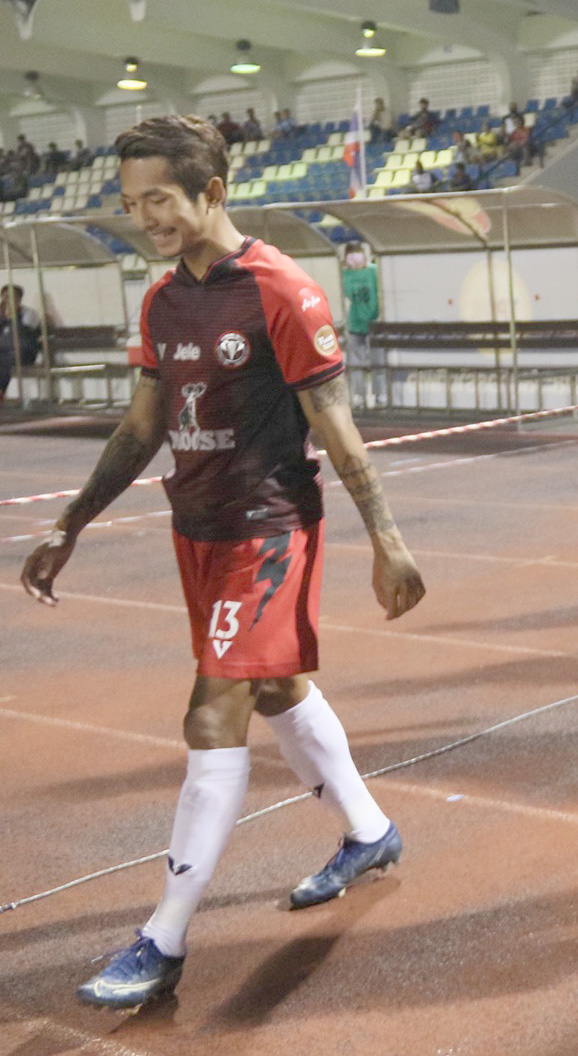

Personal information
- Full name: Saharat Kaewsangsai
- Date of birth: 8 June 1994 (age 32)
- Place of birth: Nonthaburi, Thailand
- Height: 1.74 m (5 ft 8 1/2 in)
- Position: Left back

Team information
- Current team: Chiangmai United
- Number: 13

Youth career
- 2010–2014: BEC Tero Sasana

Senior career*
Years	Team	Apps	(Gls)
2015–2016	Lamphun Warrior		
2016–2019	Chiangrai United	10	(0)
2017	→ Chiangrai City (loan)		
2018–2019	→ Chiangmai (loan)	7	(0)
2020–2021	Chiangmai United	29	(1)
2021–2022	Sukhothai	24	(0)
2022	Nakhon Ratchasima	2	(0)
2023	Chiangmai United	2	(0)
2024	Roi Et PB United F.C.	2	(0)
- * Club domestic league appearances and goals as of 12 May 2023

Saharat Kaewsangsai (Thai: สหรัฐ แก้วแสงใส; born 8 July 1994) is a Thai professional footballer who plays for Roi Et PB United in Thai League 3.
