= Naratip Phanprom =

Thai footballer

Narathip Phanprom
Personal information
- Full name: Narathip Phanprom
- Date of birth: 11 December 1978 (age 47)
- Place of birth: Pathum Thani, Thailand
- Height: 1.85 m (6 ft 1 in)
- Position: Goalkeeper

Senior career*
Years	Team	Apps	(Gls)
2007–2010	Bangkok Glass	12	(0)
2011	Army United	6	(0)
2011–2012	Ratchaburi	9	(0)
2012–2013	Bangkok	10	(0)
2013–2014	Samut Songkhram	8	(0)
2014	→ Chiangmai (loan)	10	(0)
2015	Army United	0	(0)
2015	Udon Thani	3	(0)
Total		58	(0)
- * Club domestic league appearances and goals

Narathip Phanprom (Thai: นราธิป พันธ์พร้อม) is a Thai retired professional footballer who played as a goalkeeper.

In 2009 Phanprom was a losing finalist in the Singapore Cup with Bangkok Glass.

== Honours ==
Bangkok Glass

- Queen's Cup: 2010
- Singapore Cup: 2010
