= Songsak Hemkeaw =

Thai footballer (born 1980)

Personal information
- Full name: Songsak Hemkeaw
- Date of birth: 8 April 1980 (age 46)
- Place of birth: Chaiyaphum, Thailand
- Height: 1.67 m (5 ft 5 1/2 in)
- Position: Defender

Team information
- Current team: Loei City

Senior career*
Years	Team	Apps	(Gls)
2000–2010	Bangkok United	86	(0)
2011–2014	Roi Et United	31	(2)
2015–2016	Ubon Umt United	9	(0)
2016–2017	Loei City	23	(0)
2018–2022	Suranaree Army 2		
- * Club domestic league appearances and goals

Songsak Hemkeaw (Thai: ทรงศักดิ์ เฮมเขียว born April 8, 1980), simply known as Sak (Thai: ศักดิ์). He is the former professional footballer from Chaiyaphum, Thailand.

== Honor ==
- Regional League Division 2:
  - Winners : 2015
- Regional League North-East Division
  - Runner-up : 2015
- Regional League Division 2
  - Winners :2013
- Regional League North-East Division
  - Winners :2013
- Regional League North-East Division
  - Winners :2012
- Regional League North-East Division
  - Winners :2011
