= Worakorn Wichanarong =

Thai footballer and coach

Personal information
- Full name: Worakorn Wichanarong
- Birth name: Noppadol Wichanarong
- Date of birth: 23 June 1966 (age 60)
- Place of birth: Bangkok, Thailand
- Position: Striker

Senior career*
Years	Team	Apps	(Gls)
1986–1987	Raj Pracha	12	(1)
1987–1991	Osotspa	97	(23)
1991–1996	Port	126	(40)

International career^{‡}
1983–1996	Thailand		

Managerial career
- 2009–2010: Bangkok United
- 2010–2012: Navy
- 2012–2013: Port
- 2013: Angthong
- 2014: RSU
- 2015: Phichit
- 2017: Trat
- 2017–2018: Chainat Hornbill B
- 2019–2021: Uttaradit
- * Club domestic league appearances and goals ‡ National team caps and goals as of June 28, 2008

Worakorn Wichanarong (Thai: วรกรณ์ วิจารณ์ณรงค์, born June 23, 1966) is a Thai football coach and former footballer.
