= Saranyu Intarach =

Thai footballer (born 1989)

Personal information
- Full name: Saranyu Intarach
- Date of birth: 29 June 1989 (age 37)
- Place of birth: Chiang Rai, Thailand
- Height: 1.65 m (5 ft 5 in)
- Position: Right-back

Youth career
- 2006: Police United

Senior career*
Years	Team	Apps	(Gls)
2007–2015	Police United	197	(1)
2016	Chiangrai United	11	(1)
2017	BBCU	9	(0)
2017	Sisaket	2	(0)
2018	Police Tero	0	(0)
2019–2022	PT Prachuap	30	(2)
2022	Udon Thani	12	(0)

International career
2003–2004	Thailand U16	3	(0)
2005–2006	Thailand U19	2	(0)
- * Club domestic league appearances and goals as of 1 December 2022

Saranyu Intarach (Thai: ศรันยู อินต๊ะราช, born 29 June 1989), simply known as Ta (Thai: ต๊ะ), is a Thai professional footballer who plays as a right back for Thai League 2 club Udon Thani.

== Honours ==
=== Club ===
Police United

- Thai Division 1 League: 2009, 2015

PT Prachuap FC

- Thai League Cup: 2019
