= Tony (footballer, born 1983) =

Brazilian footballer

Personal information
- Full name: Tony Heleno da Costa Pinho
- Date of birth: 15 December 1983 (age 42)
- Place of birth: Cuiabá, Brazil
- Height: 1.80 m (5 ft 11 in)
- Positions: Defensive midfielder; center back

Senior career*
Years	Team	Apps	(Gls)
2002–2005	Avaí	55	(0)
2005	Operário-MT	8	(0)
2006	Grêmio Inhumense	11	(0)
2006–2007	→ Naval 1º Maio (loan)	10	(0)
2007	→ Beira-Mar (loan)	1	(0)
2008	Cacerense	2	(0)
2009	KS Dajti	5	(0)
2009–2010	Hermann Aichinger	18	(0)
2010–2011	KS Kamza	21	(0)
2012	Army United	10	(0)
2013	Bangkok United	18	(1)
- * Club domestic league appearances and goals

Tony Heleno da Costa Pinho (born 15 December 1983), simply Tony, is a Brazilian former footballer who played as a defender, most notably for Naval in Portugal and Bangkok United in Thailand.
