= Thongchai =

Thongchai or Tongchai are romanizations of two homophonous Thai names, ธงชัย and ธงไชย (pronounced [tʰōŋ.t͡ɕʰāj]). Both are masculine given names, and also a surname.

== Given name ==
People with the given name Thongchai (ธงชัย) include:

- Thongchai Akkarapong, footballer
- Thongchai Jaidee, golfer
- Thongchai Sitsongpeenong, Muay Thai boxer
- Thongchai Sukkoki, footballer
- Thongchai Winichakul, historian
- Tongchai Teptani, boxer
- Thongchai Yenprasert, politician

People with the given name Thongchai (ธงไชย) include:

- Thongchai McIntyre, singer
- Thongchai Rathchai, footballer

== Surname ==
People with the surname Thongchai (ธงชัย) include:

- Suradech Thongchai, footballer

People with the surname Thongchai (ธงไชย) include:

- Pipob Thongchai, political activist
