= Alessandro Alves =

Brazilian footballer (born 1983)

Personal information
- Full name: Alessandro Antoniak Alves
- Date of birth: 11 June 1983 (age 43)
- Place of birth: Brazil
- Height: 1.80 m (5 ft 11 in)
- Position: Centre back

Senior career*
Years	Team	Apps	(Gls)
2007–2009	Náutico		
2009–2012	Metropolitano	1	(0)
2012–2014	Army United	38	(0)
2015	Ubon UMT United		
- * Club domestic league appearances and goals

Alessandro Antoniak Alves (born June 11, 1983) is a Brazil professional footballer who plays as a centre back for Regional League Division 2 club Ubon UMT United.

== Honours ==
=== Club ===
Ubon UMT United

- Regional League Division 2 (1): 2015
