= Ronnachai Rangsiyo =

Thai footballer (born 1988)

Personal information
- Full name: Ronnachai Rangsiyo
- Date of birth: 1 August 1988 (age 38)
- Place of birth: Sakon Nakhon, Thailand
- Height: 1.82 m (5 ft 11 1/2 in)
- Position: Forward

Youth career
- 2003–2006: Assumption College
- 2007–2008: Everton

Senior career*
Years	Team	Apps	(Gls)
2006	Rajpracha	4	(1)
2008–2009	PEA	42	(18)
2008	→ Police United (loan)	5	(2)
2009–2010	Muangthong United	8	(7)
2011–2012	BEC Tero Sasana	25	(17)
2013–2016	Bangkok United	52	(12)
2017	Air Force Central	14	(2)
2017	Super Power Samut Prakan	12	(2)
2018–2019	Chiangmai	23	(6)
2020	Ayutthaya United	4	(1)
2020–2021	Rajpracha	24	(14)
2021–2022	Lamphun Warriors	27	(1)
2022–2023	Rajpracha	32	(8)
2023–2024	Samut Prakan City	28	(3)
2024	Customs United	11	(5)
2025	Chonburi	6	(0)
2025–2026	Kasem Bundit University	10	(2)

International career
2004–2005	Thailand U17	8	(3)
2006–2011	Thailand U23	9	(2)
2008–2010	Thailand	15	(4)
- * Club domestic league appearances and goals as of 26 April 2025 (UTC)

Ronnachai Rangsiyo (Thai: รณชัย รังสิโย, born 1 August 1988), also known as Sam (Thai: แซม), is a Thai professional footballer who plays as a forward. He scored four goals for the Thai national team and captained the country's under-23 team.

== Career statistics ==
=== International ===
Appearances and goals by national team and year
National team	Year	Apps	Goals
Thailand	2008	9	4
Thailand	2009	4	0
Thailand	2010	2	0
Total		15	4

Scores and results list Thailand's goal tally first, score column indicates score after each Rangsiyo goal.

List of international goals scored by Ronnachai Rangsiyo
No.	Date	Venue	Opponent	Score	Result	Competition
1	20 May 2008	Rajamangala Stadium, Bangkok, Thailand	Nepal	3–0	7–0	Friendly
2	8 December 2008	Surakul Stadium, Phuket, Thailand	Laos	1–0	6–0	2008 AFF Championship
3	20 December 2008	Rajamangala Stadium, Bangkok, Thailand	Indonesia	2–1	2–1	2008 AFF Championship
4	24 December 2008	Rajamangala Stadium, Bangkok, Thailand	Vietnam	1–2	1–2	2008 AFF Championship

== Honours ==
=== Club ===
PEA

- Thai Premier League : 2008

Muangthong United

- Thai Premier League : 2009, 2010

Lamphun Warriors

- Thai League 2 : 2021–22

Chonburi

- Thai League 2 : 2024–25

=== International ===
Thailand

- VFF Cup (1): 2008
