= Jacob Aikhionbare =

Nigerian footballer

Personal information
- Date of birth: 21 October 1984 (age 42)
- Place of birth: Nigeria
- Height: 1.77 m (5 ft 9 1/2 in)
- Positions: Forward; striker

Senior career*
Years	Team	Apps	(Gls)
2008–2011	Thai Port	49	(21)
2012	BBCU	7	(2)
- * Club domestic league appearances and goals

Jacob Aikhionbare (born 21 October 1984) is a Nigerian association football player. He plays for Thai Premier League's Thai Port F.C.. During his first season, he scored 9 goals from 33 appearances after joining from Nigeria's Sunshine Stars F.C.

Aikhionbare was a substitute in the finals of the 2010 Thai League Cup, where he won a winner's medal after his club defeated Buriram PEA F.C..

He penned a new 2-year contract in December 2010.
