= Sattrupai Sri-narong =

Thai footballer (born 1977)

Personal information
- Full name: Sattrupai Sri-narong
- Date of birth: December 7, 1977 (age 48)
- Place of birth: Trat, Thailand
- Height: 1.71 m (5 ft 7 1/2 in)
- Positions: Attacking midfielder; right winger

Youth career
- Sinthana

Senior career*
Years	Team	Apps	(Gls)
1998–2004	Sinthana	141	(33)
2005–2006	Provincial Electricity Authority	29	(5)
2007	Rattana Bundit	17	(6)
2008	Raj-Vithi	13	(4)
2008	Royal Thai Police	28	(3)
2009	Provincial Electricity Authority	8	(2)
2010	Bangkok United	10	(1)
2011	TOT	13	(0)
2012	Cha Choeng Sao	2	(0)
2012	Osotspa	5	(0)
- * Club domestic league appearances and goals as of 3 March 2012

Sattrupai Sri-narong is a Thai former professional footballer.

== Honours ==
- Thailand Premier League: Champion (1998), Runner-up (1997) with Sinthana
- Thailand FA Cup: 1997 with Sinthana
- Kor Royal Cup: 1997, 1998 with Sinthana
