= Younes Chaib =

French footballer (born 1984)

Personal information
- Date of birth: 2 April 1984 (age 42)
- Place of birth: France
- Positions: Midfielder; winger; forward

Senior career*
Years	Team	Apps	(Gls)
-2003	Grenoble Foot 38	0	(0)
2003/2004	Genoa C.F.C.	8	(0)
2003/04-2005	A.C. Reggiana 1919	6	(0)
2005/2006	A.S.D. Sangiovannese 1927	17	(1)
2006/2007	A.C. Pisa 1909	13	(0)
2006/2007	S.S.D. Pro Sesto	4	(0)
2007/2008	Giulianova Calcio	15	(1)
2007/2008	A.S. Gubbio 1910	5	(0)
2009-2010	Sporting Club Lyon	18	(3)
- TOT S.C.
2013/2014	BSV Schwarz-Weiß Rehden	2	(0)
- * Club domestic league appearances and goals

Younes Chaib (born 2 April 1984 in France) is a French retired footballer.
