= Uilian Souza =

Brazilian footballer

Personal information
- Full name: Uilian Souza da Silva
- Date of birth: 25 July 1982 (age 44)
- Place of birth: Rio de Janeiro, Brazil
- Height: 1.76 m (5 ft 9 1/2 in)
- Position: Defensive midfielder

Team information
- Current team: TTM Customs
- Number: 19

Senior career*
Years	Team	Apps	(Gls)
2006–2007	Persmin Minahasa	22	(4)
2007–2008	Persib Bandung	18	(2)
2009–2010	Bangu	29	(0)
2011–2014	Chiangrai United	80	(0)
2015–	TTM Customs		
- * Club domestic league appearances and goals

Uilian Souza (born July 25, 1982) is a Brazilian footballer.
