= Kouadio Pascal =

Ivorian footballer

Personal information
- Full name: Kouadio Daniel Nguessan Pascal
- Date of birth: April 7, 1986 (age 40)
- Place of birth: Bouaké, Ivory Coast
- Height: 1.85 m (6 ft 1 in)
- Position: Midfielder

Team information
- Current team: Sriracha F.C.

Senior career*
Years	Team	Apps	(Gls)
2008–2009	TOT FC		
2010	Buriram PEA		
2011	Chainat F.C.		
2012	Esan United		
2014–	Sriracha F.C.		
- * Club domestic league appearances and goals as of 19 February 2009 ‡ National team caps and goals as of 6 January 2011

Kouadio Daniel Nguessan Pascal (born April 7, 1986) is an Ivorian footballer. He currently plays for Esan United in the Thai Premier League.
