= Won Yoo-hyun =

South Korean footballer

Personal information
- Date of birth: February 4, 1988 (age 38)
- Place of birth: South Korea
- Height: 1.85 m (6 ft 1 in)
- Position: Goalkeeper

Senior career*
Years	Team	Apps	(Gls)
2006–2007	Ulsan Hyundai	6	(0)
2008–2012	TTM Chiangmai	47	(0)
2013	Ulsan Hyundai Mipo	3	(0)
- * Club domestic league appearances and goals

- Won Yoo-hyun
- Hangul: 원유현
- RR: Won Yuhyeon
- MR: Wŏn Yuhyŏn

Won Yoo-hyun (Korean: 원유현, born February 4, 1988, in South Korea) is a Korean soccer goalkeeper. He currently plays for TTM Phichit F.C. in the 2011 Thai Premier League.
