= Nattapon Woratayanan =

Thai footballer

Personal information
- Full name: Nattapon Woratayanan
- Date of birth: 23 May 1985 (age 41)
- Place of birth: Chachoengsao, Thailand
- Height: 1.80 m (5 ft 11 in)
- Position: Midfielder

Youth career
- 2003: Chachoengsao
- 2004: Everton

Senior career*
Years	Team	Apps	(Gls)
2005–2007	Cha Choeng Sao	37	(5)
2008–2009	PEA	21	(0)
2010	Bangkok United	10	(0)
2011	Buriram	12	(2)
2012	Ratchaburi	8	(0)
2013–2014	PTT Rayong	16	(3)
2015–2016	Chiangrai United	20	(1)
2017	PTT Rayong	25	(0)
2018	Chachoengsao Hi-Tek	28	(2)
2019	Police Tero	26	(0)
2020–2021	MOF Customs United	16	(0)
2022–2023	Prachinburi City	14	(1)
2023	Police Tero	0	(0)
Total		233	(14)
- * Club domestic league appearances and goals as of 11 October 2008

Nattapon Woratayanan (Thai: ณัทธภณ วรทญานันทน์, born May 23, 1985), is a Thai retired professional footballer who played as a midfielder. Born in Chachoengsao, Thailand. He gained early recognition in Thai football circles through is participation in the Chang Thai to Everton project in 2004, where he had the opportunity to train at English Premier League club Everton.

In 2004, Nattapon was selected in the project "Chang Thai to Everton" and got a chance to go to football practice at Everton.

Coaching Career After retiring from professional football, Nattapon transitioned into Coaching. As of 2023, he has been involved in football management, utilizing his experience to mentor young players.

== Honours ==
=== Club ===
PEA

- Thai Premier League: 2008

Buriram

- Thai Division 1 League: 2011

Ratchaburi

- Thai Division 1 League: 2012

Prachinburi City

- Thailand Semi-Pro League: 2023
